= Rowing at the 2012 Summer Olympics =

Coordinates: 51.4933°N 0.6655°W

Rowing at the Games of the XXX Olympiad
- Venue: Eton Dorney
- Dates: 28 July – 4 August 2012
- Competitors: 550 from 58 nations

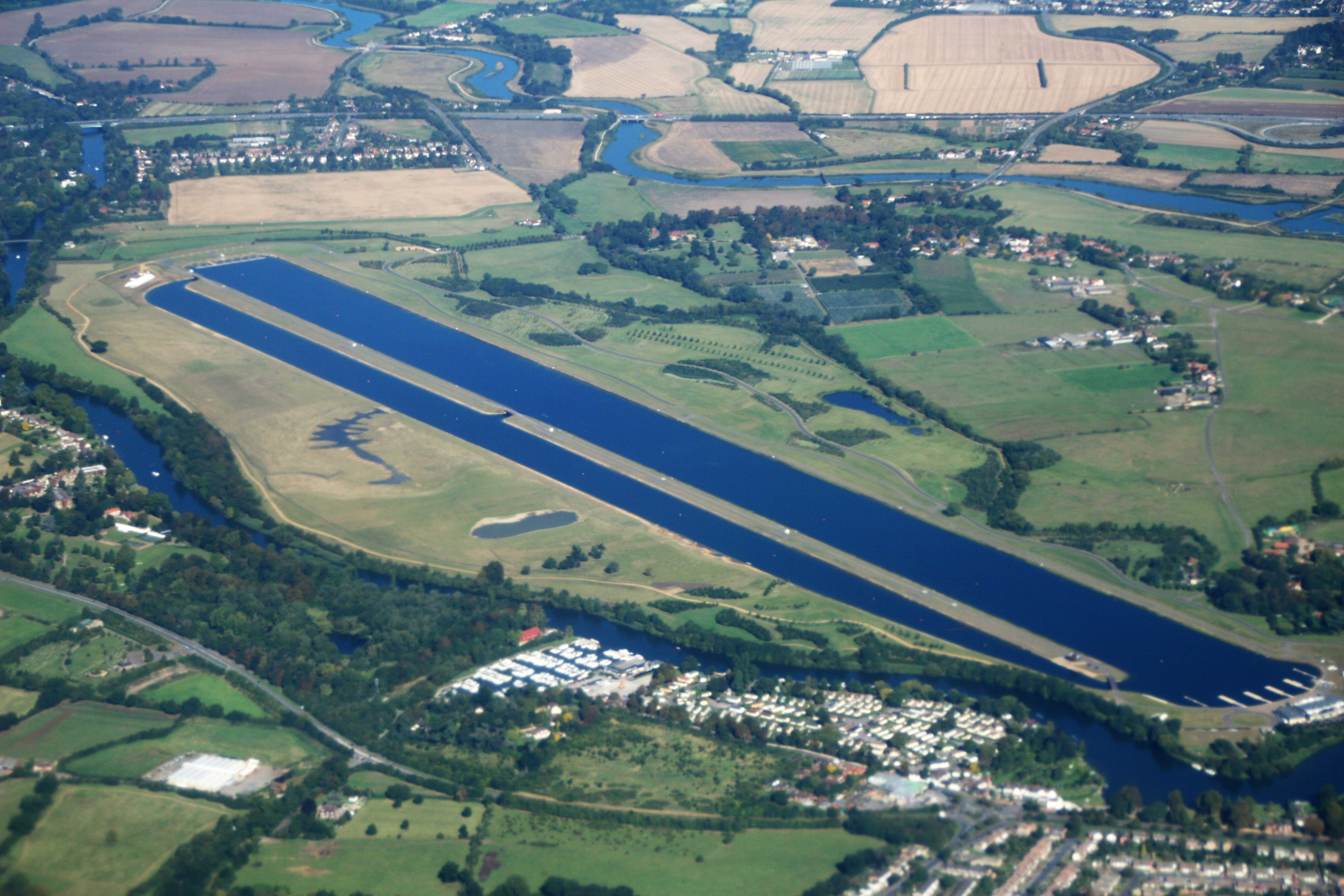
Aerial view of the venue at Dorney Lake, also known as Eton Dorney.

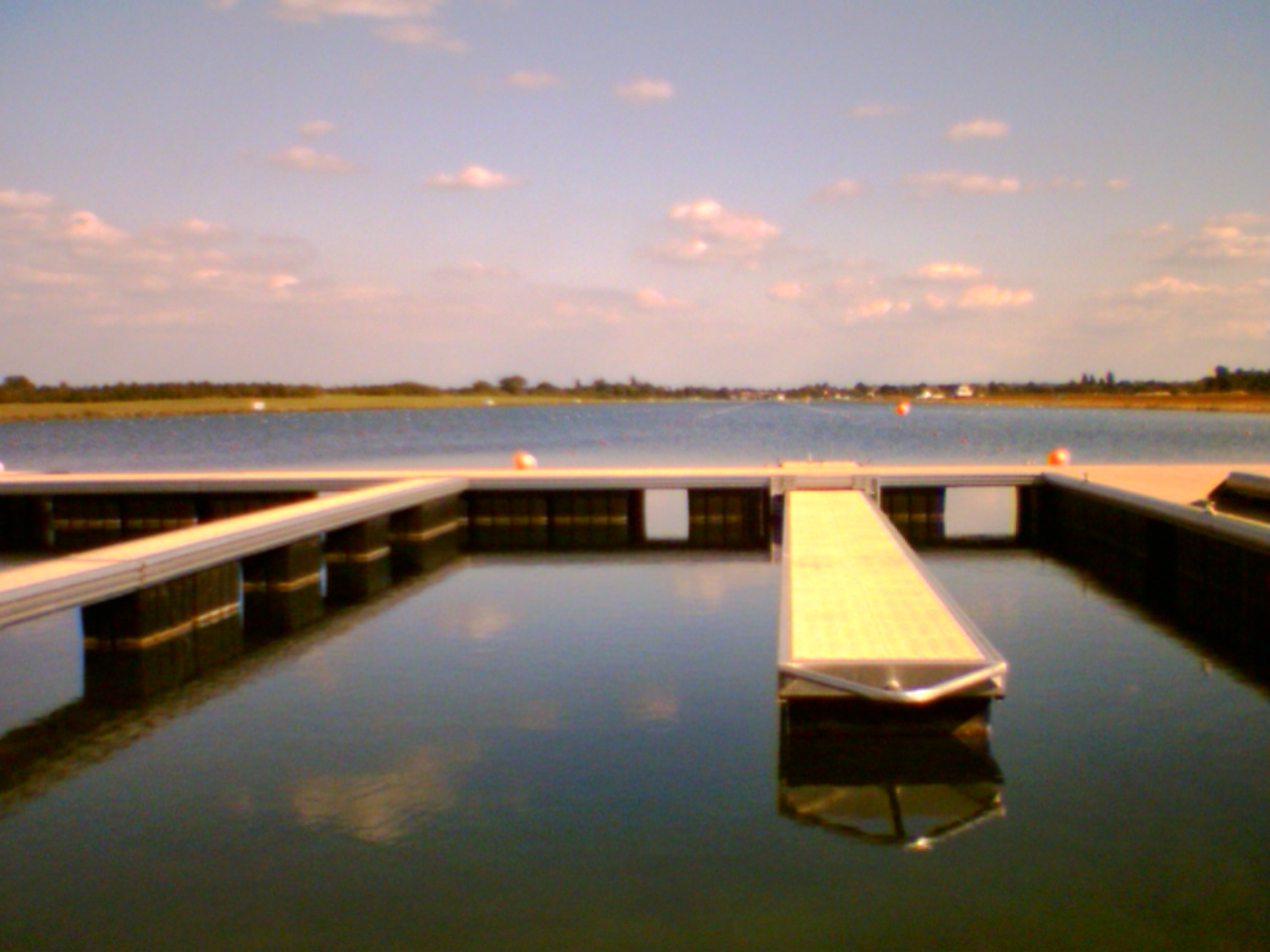
The starting line at Eton Dorney.

The rowing competitions at the 2012 Olympic Games in London were held from 28 July to 4 August 2012, at Dorney Lake which, for the purposes of the Games venue, was officially termed Eton Dorney. Fourteen medal events were contested by 550 athletes, 353 men and 197 women.

Great Britain was the most successful nation, topping the medal table with four golds and nine in total. New Zealand finished second with three golds and five medals overall.

== Venue ==
All of the rowing events were staged at the Eton Dorney Rowing Centre at Dorney Lake near Windsor Castle, 25 miles (40 km) west of London. The venue has eight lanes and is 2,200 m in length with a capacity of 30,000 spectators.

== Qualification ==
Each competing nation may qualify one boat for each of the fourteen events. The majority of qualification places were awarded based on results at the 2011 World Championships, held at Lake Bled, Slovenia, in August and September. Places are awarded to National Olympic Committees, not the specific athletes, finishing in the top 11 of men's events and top seven to nine of women's events, except in the eights where the first seven in the men's event and first five in the women's qualified. Further berths were allocated at three continental qualifying regattas in Africa, Asia and Latin America and a final Olympic qualification regatta in Lucerne, Switzerland.

== Events ==
There were eight events for men and six for women. Events included categories for open weight and restricted weight (lightweight) athletes, and two styles of rowing: sweep, where competitors each use a single oar, and sculling, where they use two.

Sculling events include men's and women's singles, doubles, lightweight doubles, and quads. Sweep events are men's and women's pairs and eights, and men's fours and lightweight fours.

== Schedule ==
H	Heats	R	Repechage	¼	Quarterfinals	½	Semifinals	F	Final

Event↓/Date →	Sat 28	Sun 29	Mon 30	Tue 31	Wed 1	Thu 2	Fri 3	Sat 4
Men's Single Sculls	H	R		¼	½		F	
Men's Pair	H		R		½		F	
Men's Double Sculls	H	R		½		F		
Men's Lightweight Double Sculls		H		R		½		F
Men's Four			H	R		½		F
Men's Quadruple Sculls	H		R		½		F	
Men's Lightweight Four	H	R		½		F		
Men's Eight	H		R		F			
Women's Single Sculls	H	R		¼		½		F
Women's Pair	H		R		F			
Women's Double Sculls			H	R			F	
Women's Lightweight Double Sculls		H		R		½		F
Women's Quadruple Sculls	H		R		F			
Women's Eight		H		R		F		

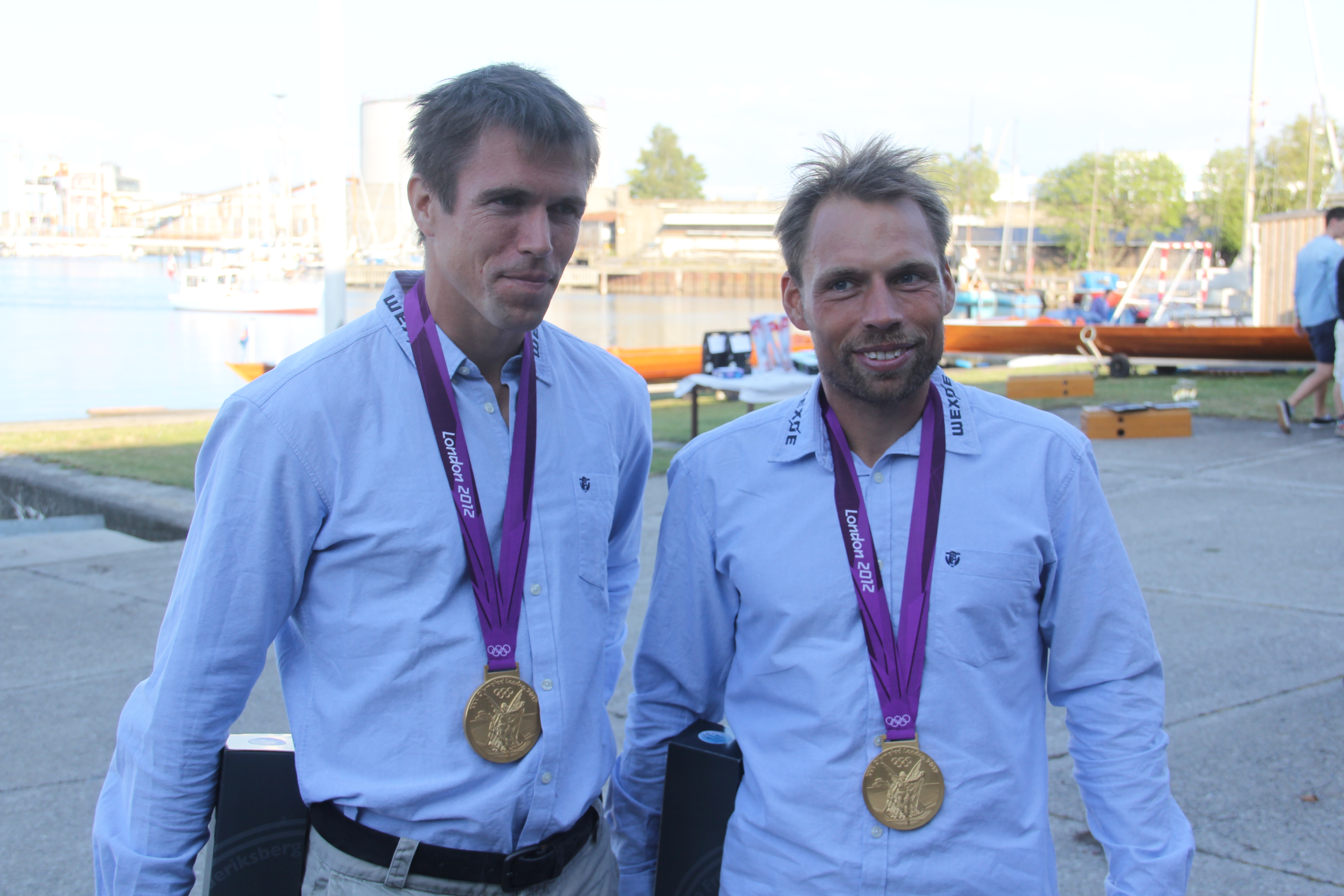
Lightweight double sculls gold medalists Mads Rasmussen and Rasmus Quist Hansen.

== Medal summary ==
=== Medal table ===
* Host nation (Great Britain)

Rank	Nation	Gold	Silver	Bronze	Total
1	Great Britain*	4	2	3	9
2	New Zealand	3	0	2	5
3	Germany	2	1	0	3
4	Denmark	1	1	1	3
5	Czech Republic	1	1	0	2
6	United States	1	0	2	3
7	South Africa	1	0	0	1
7	Ukraine	1	0	0	1
9	Australia	0	3	2	5
10	Canada	0	2	0	2
11	China	0	1	0	1
11	Croatia	0	1	0	1
11	France	0	1	0	1
11	Italy	0	1	0	1
15	Greece	0	0	1	1
15	Netherlands	0	0	1	1
15	Poland	0	0	1	1
15	Slovenia	0	0	1	1
Totals (18 entries)		14	14	14	42

=== Men's events ===
Games	Gold	Silver	Bronze
Single sculls	Mahé Drysdale; New Zealand	Ondřej Synek; Czech Republic	Alan Campbell; Great Britain
Double sculls	Nathan Cohen and Joseph Sullivan (NZL)	Alessio Sartori and Romano Battisti (ITA)	Luka Špik and Iztok Čop (SLO)
Quadruple sculls	Germany; Karl Schulze; Philipp Wende; Lauritz Schoof; Tim Grohmann	Croatia; David Šain; Martin Sinković; Damir Martin; Valent Sinković	Australia; Chris Morgan; Karsten Forsterling; James McRae; Daniel Noonan
Coxless pair	Eric Murray and Hamish Bond (NZL)	Germain Chardin and Dorian Mortelette (FRA)	George Nash and Will Satch (GBR)
Coxless four	Great Britain; Alex Gregory; Tom James; Pete Reed; Andrew Triggs Hodge	Australia; James Chapman; Josh Dunkley-Smith; Drew Ginn; Will Lockwood	United States; Charlie Cole; Scott Gault; Glenn Ochal; Henrik Rummel
Coxed eight	Germany; Filip Adamski; Andreas Kuffner; Eric Johannesen; Maximilian Reinelt; Richard Schmidt; Lukas Müller; Florian Mennigen; Kristof Wilke; Martin Sauer	Canada; Gabriel Bergen; Douglas Csima; Robert Gibson; Conlin McCabe; Malcolm Howard; Andrew Byrnes; Jeremiah Brown; Will Crothers; Brian Price	Great Britain; Alex Partridge; James Emmott; Tom Ransley; Richard Egington; Moe Sbihi; Greg Searle; Matt Langridge; Constantine Louloudis; Phelan Hill
Lightweight double sculls	Mads Rasmussen and Rasmus Quist Hansen (DEN)	Zac Purchase and Mark Hunter (GBR)	Storm Uru and Peter Taylor (NZL)
Lightweight coxless four	South Africa; James Thompson; Matthew Brittain; John Smith; Sizwe Ndlovu	Great Britain; Peter Chambers; Rob Williams; Richard Chambers; Chris Bartley	Denmark; Kasper Winther Jørgensen; Morten Jørgensen; Jacob Barsøe; Eskild Ebbesen

=== Women's events ===
Games	Gold	Silver	Bronze
Single sculls	Miroslava Knapkova; Czech Republic	Fie Udby Erichsen; Denmark	Kim Crow; Australia
Double sculls	Anna Watkins and Katherine Grainger (GBR)	Kim Crow and Brooke Pratley (AUS)	Magdalena Fularczyk and Julia Michalska (POL)
Quadruple sculls	Ukraine; Kateryna Tarasenko; Nataliya Dovhodko; Anastasiya Kozhenkova; Yana Dementyeva	Germany; Annekatrin Thiele; Carina Bär; Julia Richter; Britta Oppelt	United States; Natalie Dell; Kara Kohler; Megan Kalmoe; Adrienne Martelli
Coxless pair	Helen Glover and Heather Stanning (GBR)	Kate Hornsey and Sarah Tait (AUS)	Juliette Haigh and Rebecca Scown (NZL)
Coxed eight	United States; Erin Cafaro; Susan Francia; Esther Lofgren; Taylor Ritzel; Meghan Musnicki; Elle Logan; Caroline Lind; Caryn Davies; Mary Whipple	Canada; Janine Hanson; Rachelle Viinberg; Krista Guloien; Lauren Wilkinson; Natalie Mastracci; Ashley Brzozowicz; Darcy Marquardt; Andréanne Morin; Lesley Thompson-Willie	Netherlands; Jacobine Veenhoven; Nienke Kingma; Chantal Achterberg; Sytske de Groot; Roline Repelaer van Driel; Claudia Belderbos; Carline Bouw; Annemiek de Haan; Anne Schellekens
Lightweight double sculls	Katherine Copeland and Sophie Hosking (GBR)	Xu Dongxiang and Huang Wenyi (CHN)	Christina Giazitzidou and Alexandra Tsiavou (GRE)
