= 2010 European Rowing Championships =

- Location: Montemor-o-Velho, Portugal
- Dates: 10–12 September 2010

The 2010 European Rowing Championships, the 4th since the decision made in May 2006 by the FISA to re-establish them, was held in Montemor-o-Velho, Portugal, between 10 and 12 September 2010.

== Medal summary ==
=== Men's results ===
Event:	Gold:	Time	Silver:	Time	Bronze:	Time
M2+	Belarus; Vadzim Lialin; Aliaksandr Kazubouski; Piotr Piatrynich	7:45.50	Italy; Simone Ponti; Mario Palmisano; Andrea Lenzi (cox)	7:48.79	Czech Republic; Jakub Houška; Jakub Makovička; Oldřich Hejdušek	7:53.44
LM1x	Italy; Marcello Miani	7:45.41	Netherlands; Jaap Schouten	7:49.18	Slovakia; Lukáš Babač	7:51.45
LM2-	France; Fabien Tilliet; Jean-Christophe Bette	7:12.99	Netherlands; Joris Pijs; Paul Drewes	7:21.39	Spain; Andreu Castella; Rubén Álvarez	7:22.87
LM4x	Italy; Franco Sancassani; Pietro Ruta; Fabrizio Gabriele; Stefano Basalini	6:19.06	Denmark; Steffen Jensen; Martin Batenburg; Christian Nielsen; Hans Christian Sørensen	6:20.85	France; Pierre-Etienne Pollez; Stany Delayre; Alexandre Pilat; Frédéric Dufour	6:27.79
LM8+	Italy; Luigi Scala; Davide Riccardi; Luca De Maria; Armando Dell'Aquila; Emiliano Ceccatelli; Gennaro Gallo; Livio La Padula; Bruno Mascarenhas; Vincenzo Di Palma	6:08.64	Denmark; Anders Hansen; Lasse Dittmann; Sophus Johannesen; Jens Nielsen; Daniel Zielinski; Thorbjoern Patscheider; Jacob Barsøe; Martin Kristensen; Emil Blach	6:09.24	Portugal; Joao Gabriel; Manuel Ferreira; Octávio Barbosa; Joao Rodrigues; Pedro Vitor; Jorge Correia Carvalho; Joao Costa Amorim; Ricardo Carraco; Rui Torres	6:25.66
M2-	Greece; Georgios Tziallas; Ioannis Christou	6:30.34	Italy; Lorenzo Carboncini; Niccolò Mornati	6:33.35	Serbia; Marko Marjanović; Nikola Stojić	6:36.85
M2x	France; Cédric Berrest; Julien Bahain	6:12.12	Estonia; Allar Raja; Kaspar Taimsoo	6:12.90	Czech Republic; Petr Vitásek; David Jirka	6:13.57
M4-	Germany; René Bertram; Jochen Urban; Urs Kaeufer; Florian Eichner	5:52.54	Greece; Stergios Papachristos; Ioannis Tsilis; Nikolaos Goudoulas; Apostolos Goudoulas	5:54.08	Czech Republic; Jan Gruber; Milan Doleček; Milan Bruncvík; Michal Horváth	5:54.09
M1x	Czech Republic; Ondřej Synek	6:47.96	Sweden; Lassi Karonen	6:50.76	Germany; Karl Schulze	6:52.49
LM2x	Germany; Linus Lichtschlag; Lars Hartig	6:21.46	Portugal; Pedro Fraga; Nuno Mendes	6:22.50	France; Jérémie Azou; Rémi Di Girolamo	6:23.99
LM4-	Germany; Bastian Seibt; Jost Schömann-Finck; Jochen Kühner; Martin Kühner	5:54.78	Poland; Łukasz Pawłowski; Łukasz Siemion; Miłosz Bernatajtys; Paweł Rańda	5:56.58	Switzerland; Simon Schürch; Lucas Tramèr; Simon Niepmann; Mario Gyr	5:58.29
M4x	Poland; Konrad Wasielewski; Marek Kolbowicz; Michał Jeliński; Adam Korol	5:53.04	Croatia; David Šain; Martin Sinković; Damir Martin; Valent Sinković	5:54.05	Ukraine; Volodymyr Pavlovskyy; Serhiy Hryn; Serhiy Biloushchenko; Ivan Dovhodko	5:54.36
M8+	Germany; Gregor Hauffe; Maximilian Reinelt; Kristof Wilke; Florian Mennigen; Richard Schmidt; Lukas Mueller; Toni Seifert; Sebastian Schmidt; Martin Sauer	5:51.94	Poland; Rafał Hejmej; Jarosław Godek; Piotr Hojka; Krystian Aranowski; Michał Szpakowski; Marcin Brzeziński; Piotr Juszczak; Mikołaj Burda; Daniel Trojanowski	5:54.22	Ukraine; Andriy Pryveda; Viktor Hrebennikov; Anton Kholyaznykov; Dmytro Prokopenko; Oleh Lykov; Valentyn Kletskoy; Andriy Shpak; Sergiy Chykanov; Oleksandr Konovaliuk	5:57.82

=== Women's results ===
Event:	Gold:	Time	Silver:	Time	Bronze:	Time
W4-	Belarus; Hanna Haura; Natallia Helakh; Natallia Haurylenka; Zinaida Kliuchynskaya	7:28.81	Italy; Samantha Molina; Gioia Sacco; Claudia Wurzel; Valentina Calabrese	7:35.44		
LW1x	Germany; Marie-Louise Dräger	8:39.47	Austria; Michaela Taupe-Traer	8:46.15	Italy; Laura Milani	8:53.30
LW4x	Italy; Enrica Marasca; Giulia Pollini; Eleonora Trivella; Erika Bello	7:15.18	Denmark; Christina Pultz; Marie Gottlieb; Mia Espersen; Sarah Christensen	7:21.07		
W2-	Romania; Camelia Lupașcu; Nicoleta Albu	7:22.89	Germany; Kerstin Hartmann; Marlene Sinnig	7:25.25	Croatia; Sonja Kešerac; Maja Anić	7:27.62
W2x	Germany; Annekatrin Thiele; Stephanie Schiller	6:49.87	Poland; Magdalena Fularczyk; Julia Michalska	6:51.86	Italy; Laura Schiavone; Elisabetta Sancassani	6:53.39
W1x	Belarus; Ekaterina Karsten	7:24.63	Czech Republic; Miroslava Knapková	7:25.90	Sweden; Frida Svensson	7:27.47
LW2x	Greece; Christina Giazitzidou; Alexandra Tsiavou	6:58.18	Poland; Magdalena Kemnitz; Agnieszka Renc	7:06.16	Germany; Daniela Reimer; Anja Noske	7:08.29
W4x	Ukraine; Kateryna Tarasenko; Olena Buryak; Anastasiya Kozhenkova; Yana Dementyeva	6:22.22	Germany; Britta Oppelt; Carina Bär; Tina Manker; Julia Richter	6:24.42	Switzerland; Regina Naunheim; Nora Fiechter; Katja Hauser; Martina Ernst	6:28.69
W8+	Romania; Roxana Cogianu; Ionela Zaharia; Maria Diana Bursuc; Ioana Crăciun; Adelina Cojocariu; Nicoleta Albu; Camelia Lupașcu; Eniko Mironcic; Teodora Stoica	6:36.45	Netherlands; Kirsten Wielaard; Claudia Belderbos; Roline Repelaer van Driel; Sytske de Groot; Chantal Achterberg; Nienke Kingma; Carline Bouw; Femke Dekker; Anne Schellekens	6:39.35	Germany; Eva Paus; Anika Kniest; Constanze Siering; Silke Günther; Kathrin Thiem; Ulrike Sennewald; Nina Wengert; Anna-Maria Kipphardt; Laura Schwensen	6:41.51

== Medal count ==
Rank	Nation	Gold	Silver	Bronze	Total
1	Germany (GER)	6	2	3	11
2	Italy (ITA)	4	3	2	9
3	Belarus (BLR)	3	0	0	3
4	Greece (GRE)	2	1	0	3
5	France (FRA)	2	0	2	4
6	Romania (ROU)	2	0	0	2
7	Poland (POL)	1	4	0	5
8	Czech Republic (CZE)	1	1	3	5
9	Ukraine (UKR)	1	0	2	3
10	Denmark (DEN)	0	3	0	3
10	Netherlands (NED)	0	3	0	3
12	Croatia (CRO)	0	1	1	2
12	Estonia (EST)	0	1	1	2
12	Portugal (POR)	0	1	1	2
15	Austria (AUT)	0	1	0	1
15	Sweden (SWE)	0	1	0	1
17	Switzerland (SUI)	0	0	2	2
18	Serbia (SRB)	0	0	1	1
18	Slovakia (SVK)	0	0	1	1
18	Spain (ESP)	0	0	1	1
Totals (20 entries)		22	22	20	64
