= 2013 European Rowing Championships =

International rowing event

- Location: Seville, Spain
- Dates: 31 May – 2 June 2013

The 2013 European Rowing Championships was held in Seville, Spain, between 31 May and 2 June 2013.

== Medal summary ==
=== Men ===
Event	Gold	Time	Silver	Time	Bronze	Time
LM1x	Henrik Stephansen (DEN)	7:37.93	Pedro Fraga (POR)	7:38.84	Jonathan Koch (GER)	7:48.42
M1x	Ondřej Synek (CZE)	7:36.35	Marcel Hacker (GER)	7:40.75	Roel Braas (NED)	7:45.95
LM2x	France (FRA); Stany Delayre; Jérémie Azou	6:56.61	Norway (NOR); Kristoffer Brun; Are Strandli	6:58.96	Switzerland (SUI); Simon Schürch; Mario Gyr	6:59.40
LM2−	Switzerland (SUI); Simon Niepmann; Lucas Tramèr	7:23.21	Italy (ITA); Guido Gravina; Giorgio Tuccinardi	7:24.52	Spain (ESP); Xavier Vela; Daniel Sigurbjörnsson	7:25.79
M2x	Italy (ITA); Francesco Fossi; Romano Battisti	6:37.05	Lithuania (LTU); Rolandas Maščinskas; Saulius Ritter	6:37.67	Norway (NOR); Nils Jakob Hoff; Kjetil Borch	6:38.97
M2−	Serbia (SRB); Nenad Beđik; Nikola Stojić	7:02.59	Poland (POL); Wojciech Gutorski; Jarosław Godek	7:04.98	Netherlands (NED); Rogier Blink; Mitchel Steenman	7:08.27
LM4−	Denmark (DEN); Kasper Winther Jørgensen; Jacob Larsen; Jacob Barsøe; Morten Jørgensen	6:27.28	Czech Republic (CZE); Jan Vetešník; Ondřej Vetešník; Jiří Kopáč; Miroslav Vraštil Jr.	6:29.68	France (FRA); Franck Solforosi; Guillaume Raineau; Augustin Mouterde; Thomas Baroukh	6:30.38
M4x	Germany (GER); Karl Schulze; Paul Heinrich; Lauritz Schoof; Tim Grohmann	6:07.41	Poland (POL); Dawid Grabowski; Konrad Wasielewski; Piotr Licznerski; Adam Wicenciak	6:09.51	Italy (ITA); Matteo Stefanini; Simone Venier; Luca Rambaldi; Simone Raineri	6:09.59
M4−	Netherlands (NED); Boaz Meylink; Kaj Hendriks; Mechiel Versluis; Robert Luecken	6:21.79	Romania (ROU); Marius Cozmiuc; George Palamariu; Cristi-Ilie Pirghie; Florin Curuea	6:23.83	Germany (GER); Toni Seifert; Felix Wimberger; Malte Jakschik; Max Planer	6:24.94
M8+	Germany (GER); Maximilian Munski; Hannes Ocik; Maximilian Reinelt; Felix Drahotta; Anton Braun; Richard Schimidt; Kristof Wilke; Eric Johannesen; Martin Sauer	5:59.00	Poland (POL); Marcin Brzeziński; Piotr Juszczak; Mikołaj Burda; Piotr Hojka; Zbigniew Schodowski; Michał Szpakowski; Krystian Aranowski; Rafał Hejmej; Daniel Trojanowski	6:00.31	Netherlands (NED); Sjoerd de Groot; Ruben Knab; Gerbren Spoelstra; Thomas Doornbos; Vincent van der Want; Boudewijn Röell; David Kuiper; Govert Viergever; Peter Wiersum	6:00.93

=== Women ===
Event	Gold	Time	Silver	Time	Bronze	Time
LW1x	Aikaterini Nikolaidou (GRE)	8:32.92	Michaela Taupe-Traer (AUT)	8:36.59	Marie-Anne Frenken (NED)	8:39.14
W1x	Miroslava Knapková (CZE)	8:15.48	Magdalena Lobnig (AUT)	8:18.24	Inge Janssen (NED)	8:21.30
LW2x	Italy (ITA); Laura Milani; Elisabetta Sancassani	7:37.92	Germany (GER); Lena Mueller; Anja Noske	7:42.64	Poland (POL); Weronika Deresz; Katarzyna Welna	7:47.10
W2x	Lithuania (LTU); Donata Vištartaitė; Milda Valčiukaitė	7:21.87	Poland (POL); Magdalena Fularczyk; Natalia Madaj	7:28.34	Belarus (BLR); Ekaterina Karsten; Yuliya Bichyk	7:31.94
W2−	Romania (ROU); Cristina Grigoras; Andreea Boghian	7:49.09	Germany (GER); Kerstin Hartmann; Marlene Sinnig	7:51.56	Ukraine (UKR); Svitlana Novichenko; Anna Kontseva	7:57.26
W4x	Germany (GER); Annekatrin Thiele; Carina Bär; Julia Richter; Britta Oppelt	6:45.01	Netherlands (NED); Wianka van Dorp; Sophie Souwer; Lisa Scheenaard; Nicole Beukers	6:48.67	Italy (ITA); Laura Schiavone; Giada Colombo; Sara Magnaghi; Gaia Palma	6:49.57
W8+	Romania (ROU); Roxana Cogianu; Ionela Zaharia; Cristina Grigoras; Irina Dorneanu; Adelina Cojocariu; Andreea Boghian; Camelia Lupașcu; Nicoleta Albu; Daniela Druncea	6:41.83	Germany (GER); Lisa Kemmerer; Anne Becker; Sophie Paul; Ulrike Sennewald; Micaela Schmidt; Ronja Schütte; Julia Lepke; Kathrin Marchand; Laura Schwensen	6:50.20	Russia (RUS); Yulia Inozemtseva; Oxana Strelkova; Anastasia Karabelshikova; Aleksandra Fedorova; Tatiana Afinogenova; Anastasia Tikhanova; Elizaveta Tikhanova; Anastasia Zhukova; Ksenia Volkova	6:53.32

== Medal table ==
Rank	Nation	Gold	Silver	Bronze	Total
1	Germany (GER)	3	4	2	9
2	Italy (ITA)	2	1	2	5
3	Czech Republic (CZE)	2	1	0	3
3	Romania (ROU)	2	1	0	3
5	Denmark (DEN)	2	0	0	2
6	Netherlands (NED)	1	1	5	7
7	Lithuania (LTU)	1	1	0	2
8	France (FRA)	1	0	1	2
8	Switzerland (SUI)	1	0	1	2
10	Greece (GRE)	1	0	0	1
10	Serbia (SRB)	1	0	0	1
12	Poland (POL)	0	4	1	5
13	Austria (AUT)	0	2	0	2
14	Norway (NOR)	0	1	1	2
15	Portugal (POR)	0	1	0	1
16	Belarus (BLR)	0	0	1	1
16	Russia (RUS)	0	0	1	1
16	Spain (ESP)	0	0	1	1
16	Ukraine (UKR)	0	0	1	1
Totals (19 entries)		17	17	17	51
