= Rowing at the 2012 Summer Olympics – Women's eight =

Women's eight at the Games of the XXX Olympiad
- Venue: Eton Dorney
- Date: 29 July – 2 August 2012
- Competitors: 56 from 7 nations
- Winning time: 6:10.59

Medalists
1st place, gold medalist(s)		Erin Cafaro; Susan Francia; Esther Lofgren; Taylor Ritzel; Meghan Musnicki; Elle Logan; Caroline Lind; Caryn Davies; Mary Whipple	United States
2nd place, silver medalist(s)		Janine Hanson; Rachelle Viinberg; Krista Guloien; Lauren Wilkinson; Natalie Mastracci; Ashley Brzozowicz; Darcy Marquardt; Andréanne Morin; Lesley Thompson-Willie	Canada
3rd place, bronze medalist(s)		Jacobine Veenhoven; Ninke Kingma; Chantal Achterberg; Sytske de Groot; Roline Repelaer van Driel; Claudia Belderbos; Carline Bouw; Annemiek de Haan; Anne Schellekens	Netherlands

The Women's eight competition at the 2012 Summer Olympics in London took place are at Dorney Lake which, for the purposes of the Games venue, is officially termed Eton Dorney.

== Schedule ==
All times are British Summer Time (UTC+1)

Date	Time	Round
Sunday, 29 July 2012	11:50	Heats
Tuesday, 31 July 2012	10:50	Repechage
Thursday, 2 August 2012	12:30	Final

== Results ==
=== Heats ===
First team of each heat qualify to the final, remainder goes to the repechage.

==== Heat 1 ====
Rank	Rowers	Country	Time	Notes
1	Cafaro, Francia, Lofgren, Ritzel, Musnicki, Logan, Lind, Davies, Whipple	United States	6:14.68	Q
2	Vermeersch, Chatterton, Selby Smith, Cook, Gerrand, Hagan, Kehoe, Stanley, Patrick	Australia	6:20.89	R
3	Whitlam, Reeve, Eddie, Maguire, Page, Vernon, Greves, Thornley, O'Connor	Great Britain	6:23.51	R
4	Schütte, Lepke, Schulze, Thiem, Sennewald, Drygalla, Marchand, Siering, Schwensen	Germany	6:34.32	R

==== Heat 2 ====
Rank	Rowers	Country	Time	Notes
1	Hanson, Viinberg, Guloien, Wilkinson, Mastracci, Brzozowicz, Marquardt, Morin, Thompson-Willie	Canada	6:13.91	Q
2	Cogianu, Albu, Grigoraș, Dorneanu, Lupașcu, Mironcic, Cojocariu, Rotaru, Gîdoiu	Romania	6:16.61	R
3	Veenhoven, Kingma, Achterberg, de Groot, Repelaer van Driel, Belderbos, Bouw, de Haan, Schellekens	Netherlands	6:18.98	R

=== Repechage ===
First four qualify to the final.

Rank	Rower	Country	Time	Notes
1	Veenhoven, Kingma, Achterberg, de Groot, Repelaer van Driel, Belderbos, Bouw, de Haan, Schellekens	Netherlands	6:15.36	Q
2	Cogianu, Albu, Grigoraș, Dorneanu, Lupașcu, Mironcic, Cojocariu, Rotaru, Gîdoiu	Romania	6:16.16	Q
3	Vermeersch, Chatterton, Selby Smith, Cook, Gerrand, Hagan, Kehoe, Stanley, Patrick	Australia	6:18.63	Q
4	Whitlam, Reeve, Eddie, Maguire, Page, Vernon, Greves, Thornley, O'Connor	Great Britain	6:21.58	Q
5	Schütte, Lepke, Schulze, Thiem, Sennewald, Drygalla, Marchand, Siering, Schwensen	Germany	6:27.69	

=== Final ===
Rank	Rowers	Country	Time	Notes
1st place, gold medalist(s)	Cafaro, Francia, Lofgren, Ritzel, Musnicki, Logan, Lind, Davies, Whipple	United States	6:10.59	
2nd place, silver medalist(s)	Hanson, Viinberg, Guloien, Wilkinson, Mastracci, Brzozowicz, Marquardt, Morin, Thompson-Willie	Canada	6:12.06	
3rd place, bronze medalist(s)	Veenhoven, Kingma, Achterberg, de Groot, Repelaer van Driel, Belderbos, Bouw, de Haan, Schellekens	Netherlands	6:13.12	
4	Cogianu, Albu, Grigoraș, Dorneanu, Lupașcu, Mironcic, Cojocariu, Rotaru, Gîdoiu	Romania	6:17.64	
5	Whitlam, Reeve, Eddie, Maguire, Page, Vernon, Greves, Thornley, O'Connor	Great Britain	6:18.77	
6	Vermeersch, Chatterton, Selby Smith, Cook, Gerrand, Hagan, Kehoe, Stanley, Patrick	Australia	6:18.86	
