= Esther Lofgren =

American rower (born 1985)

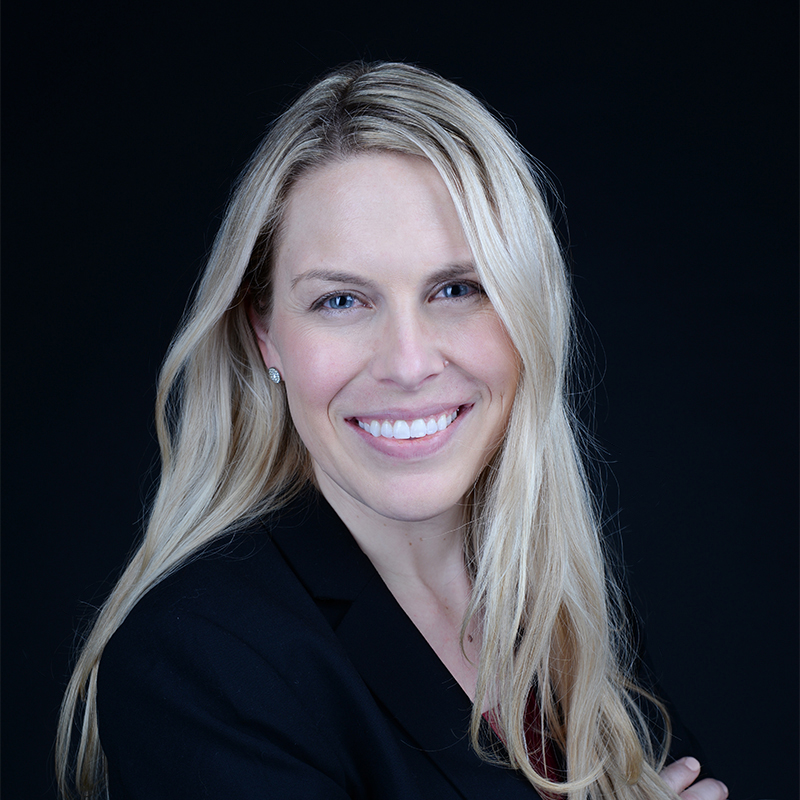

Personal information
- Born: Esther Ruth Lofgren; February 28, 1985 (age 41) Long Beach, California, U.S.
Medal record
Women's rowing
Representing United States
Olympic Games
Gold medal – first place	2012 London	Women's eight
World Rowing Championships
Gold medal – first place	2010 Karapiro	W8+
Gold medal – first place	2011 Lake Bled	W8+
Silver medal – second place	2008 Linz	W4-
Silver medal – second place	2009 Poznań	W4-
Bronze medal – third place	2006 Eton	W4-

Esther Ruth Lofgren (born February 28, 1985) is an American rower and an Olympic gold medalist. She won the gold medal in the women's eight at the 2012 Summer Games in London. Lofgren is a graduate of Harvard College, where she rowed for Radcliffe and was a two-time All-American. She is an eight-time member of the U.S. National Rowing Team and a seven-time World Championship medalist.

== Early life ==
Lofgren attended Mariners Elementary School and Ensign Middle School in Newport Beach, California. She graduated as valedictorian from Newport Harbor High School in Newport Beach, California, where she played volleyball and basketball with fellow 2012 Olympian April Ross before taking up rowing.

Introduced to the sport in 1998, Lofgren began rowing at the Newport Aquatic Center, where Olympic Gold Medalist Xeno Müller coached her for a season. Lofgren helped the women's junior team qualify the eight for the National Youth Invitational for the first time in the program's history, and performed well enough by her junior and senior years to be recruited by top schools.

Lofgren continued rowing at Harvard University, where she was twice named a first-team DI All-American, as well as a winner of the Athletic Excellence Award her senior year. She also competed on the U.S. National Rowing Team, making the squad for the first time as a college sophomore, and won two Under-23 golds and a Senior World Championships silver and bronze while still an undergrad. (YH) After college, Lofgren decided to pursue rowing full-time and moved to Princeton, New Jersey to join the USRowing Training Center.

== Career ==
After her sophomore year in college, Lofgren earned a seat on both the Under-23 and the Senior National Teams, winning and setting the World Record in the BW8+ and taking bronze in the W4- with future Olympic teammate Erin Cafaro. The next year, Lofgren joined future Olympic teammate Genevra Stone to win the BW4x. Lofgren took the year off from college to compete for a spot on the Beijing Olympic squad, in 2008, but was instead the last woman cut from the selection camp. Lofgren then stroked the W4- to a silver medal at the 2008 World Rowing Championships. She also stroked the W4- to a silver medal at the 2009 World Rowing Championships, this time with future Olympic teammate Elle Logan.

After graduating from Harvard in 2009, Lofgren joined the USRowing Training Center in Princeton, NJ. She overcame two late-season rib fractures to earn a seat in the 2010 World Championship W8+, which took gold at Lake Karapiro in New Zealand. In 2011, she became the first woman ever, and the first athlete since Sir Matthew Pinsent in 2001, to win two championship events at the Henley Royal Regatta, winning the Remenham Challenge Cup (women's eight) and the Princess Grace Challenge Cup (women's quadruple sculls). She was the first athlete ever to win both a sweep championship event and a sculling championship event in the same Henley Royal Regatta. Lofgren then went on to win gold at Lake Bled in Slovenia as part of the 2011 USA World Championship Women's 8+.

In 2012, Lofgren joined Mary Whipple, Caryn Davies, Caroline Lind, Amanda Polk, Meghan Musnicki, Taylor Ritzel, Jamie Redman, and Susan Francia to set the World Record in the women's 8+ in the heats of the Lucerne Rowing World Cup. She then joined Whipple, Davies, Lind, Elle Logan, Musnicki, Ritzel, Francia, and Erin Cafaro to win gold at the London 2012 Olympic Games.

When she won a gold medal in women's eight at the 2012 London Games, Lofgren knew her perseverance had paid off. Regarding the win, she said, “It’s been a seven-year journey to make this team and all the hard work was worth it.“

Lofgren raced in the women's 4x at the 2013 Lucerne Rowing World Cup, finishing 6th, and in the women's 4x at the 2013 World Rowing Championships, finishing 5th.

At the 2015 MidAtlantic Erg Sprints, Lofgren "shattered" the half-marathon indoor rowing World Record by more than three minutes, finishing in a time of 1 hour, 20 minutes and 12.1 seconds.

== Non-competition awards and accolades ==
In 2009, Lofgren received Radcliffe Crew's Athletic Excellence award and was named a D1 First-Team All-American in 2008 and 2009. As a high school student, she was awarded a National Merit Scholarship.

In 2012, Lofgren and her Olympic gold medal women's 8+ crew were awarded the Ernestine Bayer Award, given by USRowing for contributions to women's rowing.

In 2017, Lofgren, along with rugby legend Phaidra Knight and water polo legend Brenda Villa, was awarded the Yolanda L. Jackson Give Back Award by the Women's Sports Foundation for athletes who exemplify what it means to be a role model, and who know the importance of giving back.

== Personal life ==
Lofgren comes from a family of rowers. Her parents, Karl and Christine Lofgren, met in the boathouse at MIT and moved to Long Beach, California in the early 1980s to train for the Olympic rowing team that would compete at the Los Angeles Olympic Games. Her parents both fell just short of that dream – including her mother being the last woman cut from selection camp for the Olympic quadruple sculls crew that went on to win gold – but decided to start a family instead. Esther Ruth Lofgren was born the following year.

Lofgren blogs on her personal blog Harder.Better.Faster.Stronger, where she shares training tips, playlists, and an inside look at life as an elite rower and athlete. She enjoys reading, running, cycling, blogging, and photography and aspires to run a sub-three hour marathon and complete an Ironman triathlon. She also posts information about her coaching services and upcoming speaking engagements and appearances on her website, http://estherlofgren.com.

In 2015, Lofgren married Jacob Barrett. They have one child and currently live in Germany.

Lofgren currently works as Vice President of Business Development and Marketing for The SPECTRUM Group. From 2012 to 2015, she served on the Board of Directors of USRowing, and as the peer-elected rowing representative to the United States Olympic Committee's Athlete Advisory Council. She is also involved with the Women's Sports Foundation. Lofgren works continually to expand girls' and women's access to sports and rowing through advocacy work, public appearances, speaking engagements, and various forms of social media.
