= NCAA Division I rowing championship =

Rowing championship for women's heavyweight crews

- Association: NCAA
- Sport: College rowing
- Founded: 1997; 29 years ago
- Division: Division I
- No. of teams: 22
- Country: United States
- Most recent champion: Texas (4th title)
- Most titles: Brown (7)
- Website: NCAA.com

The NCAA Division I Rowing Championship is a rowing championship held by the NCAA for Division I women's heavyweight (or openweight) collegiate crews. All of the sponsored races are 2,000 meters (6,562 ft) long (the NCAA does not sponsor men's rowing (both heavyweight and lightweight) and women's lightweight rowing championships.

The inaugural National Championship was held in 1997 for the top 16 crews in the country, located at Lake Natoma, Sacramento, California. In 2002, the NCAA added championships for Division II and Division III.

Brown have been the most successful team, with seven national titles.

Texas are the reigning national champions, winning their fourth national title in 2026.

== Automatic qualifier spots ==
Ten rowing conferences each get one Automatic Qualifier spot by winning their conference points championship, except for the Ivy League whose Automatic Qualifier goes to the Varsity Eight winner. There are another 12 At-Large spots.

- MAC
- Big 12
- Ivy League
- Big Ten
- ACC
- Atlantic 10
- Coastal
- Patriot League
- West Coast
- MAAC

== Format ==
The NCAA Division I Women's Rowing Championships have three events (I Eights, II Eights, Fours), and twenty-two teams compete. Eleven teams are selected through automatic qualification based on conference results. An additional eleven at-large teams are selected by the NCAA Rowing Committee. In previous years an additional, four at-large I Eights are selected. As of 2009 all bids must be full teams.

Teams are awarded points by their final placing in each event. The NCAA Champion is determined by the team which accumulates the most points. Since 2013, the winner of the I-Eights event gets 66 points, and the team that places second gets 63 points, third gets 60, etc. For the II-Eights there are 44 points for the winner, and the points obtained go down in steps of two for each next spot in the final ranking. For the event with Fours, the winner gets 22 points, and the subsequent finishers get 21, 20, 19, etc. When teams are tied for points after the three events, the NCAA champion is determined by the team with the higher placing in the I Eight event.

At-large participants in the championships are selected by the NCAA Division I Women’s Rowing Committee. The following criteria are used in selecting teams and individual boats:

- Regional championship results.
- Regional ranking.
- Late season performance.
- Head-to-head results.
- Results versus team already selected.
- Results versus common opponents.
- Results versus regionally ranked team.

== Champions ==
=== Results ===
NCAA Division I Rowing Championships
Year	Site (Host Team)	Team Results				Individual Results		
Year	Site (Host Team)	Champion	Score	Runner-up	Score	Fours	II Eights	I Eights
1997	Rancho Cordova, CA	Washington	201	Princeton	184	Brown	Princeton	Washington
1998	Gainesville, GA	Washington (2)	91	Princeton	85	USC	Virginia	Washington
1999	Rancho Cordova, CA	Brown	56	Virginia	56	Washington	Virginia	Brown
2000	Camden, NJ	Brown (2)	59	Washington	55	Washington	Brown	Brown
2001	Gainesville, GA	Washington (3)	58	Michigan	53	Washington	Michigan	Washington
2002	Indianapolis, IN	Brown (3)	67	Washington	63	Brown	Washington	Washington
2003	Indianapolis, IN	Harvard	59	Brown	57	Brown	Brown	Harvard
2004	Gold River, CA	Brown (4)	70	Yale	58	Virginia	Brown	Brown
2005	Gold River, CA	California	67	Virginia	63	Virginia	Virginia	California
2006	West Windsor, NJ	California (2)	66	Brown	66	Brown	Brown	Princeton
2007	Oak Ridge, TN	Brown (5)	58	Virginia	54	Virginia	Minnesota	Yale
2008	Gold River, CA	Brown (6)	67	Washington	59	Washington	Brown	Yale
2009	Cherry Hill, NJ	Stanford	88	California	85	Clemson	Yale	Stanford
2010	Gold River, CA	Virginia	87	California	82	Virginia	Brown	Yale
2011	Gold River, CA	Brown (7)	85	Stanford	85	California	Stanford	Princeton
2012	West Windsor, NJ	Virginia (2)	87	Michigan	82	Ohio State	Michigan	Virginia
2013	Indianapolis, IN	Ohio State	126	California	124	Ohio State	Ohio State	California
2014	Indianapolis, IN	Ohio State (2)	126	California	118	California	Ohio State	Ohio State
2015	Gold River, CA	Ohio State (3)	126	California	114	Virginia	Brown	Ohio State
2016	Gold River, CA	California (3)	129	Ohio State	126	Ohio State	California	Ohio State
2017	West Windsor, NJ	Washington (4)	132	California	123	Washington	Washington	Washington
2018	Sarasota, FL	California (4)	130	Washington	128	California	Washington	California
2019	Indianapolis, IN	Washington (5)	132	Texas	125	Washington	Washington	Washington
2020	Oak Ridge, TN	Cancelled due to the coronavirus pandemic						
2021	Sarasota, FL	Texas	126	Stanford	126	Washington	Washington	Texas
2022	Sarasota, FL	Texas (2)	124	Stanford	124	Princeton	Yale	Texas
2023	Pennsauken, NJ (Temple)	Stanford (2)	129	Washington	120	Texas	Stanford	Stanford
2024	Bethel, OH (Marietta)	Texas (3)	130	Stanford	127	Texas	Stanford	Texas
2025	West Windsor, NJ (Ivy & MAAC)	Stanford (3)	129	Yale	121	Stanford	Stanford	Yale
2026	Gainesville, GA (North Georgia)	Texas (4)	130	Stanford	125	Texas	Stanford	Texas
2027	Sarasota, FL							
2028	Sarasota, FL							

=== Team titles ===
Schools that have won the NCAA Division I Women's Rowing Championship
7, 5, 4, 3, 2, 1

Team	#	Years
Brown	7	1999, 2000, 2002, 2004, 2007, 2008, 2011
Washington	5	1997, 1998, 2001, 2017, 2019
California	4	2005, 2006, 2016, 2018
Texas	4	2021, 2022, 2024, 2026
Ohio State	3	2013, 2014, 2015
Stanford	3	2009, 2023, 2025
Virginia	2	2010, 2012
Harvard	1	2003

== Appearances by team ==
Key

- CH National Champion
- RU National Runner-up
- Numbers indicate the placement of the team in that tournament beyond second

School	Conference (as of 2027)	#	CH	97	98	99	00	01	02	03	04	05	06	07	08	09	10	11	12	13	14	15	16	17	18	19	21	22	23	24	25	26
Brown	Ivy League	29	7	3	RU	CH	CH	3	CH	RU	CH	3	RU	CH	CH	5	5	CH	14	7	3	3	6	8	10	9	8	7	7	6	7	10
Washington	Big Ten	29	5	CH	CH	3	RU	CH	RU	3	5	9	7	10	RU	7	10	8	7	6	7	4	5	CH	RU	CH	3	4	RU	5	4	6
California	ACC	27	4			6	4	6	3	5	4	CH	CH	7	3	RU	RU	3	3	RU	RU	RU	CH	RU	CH	6	9	6	8	9	9	8
Texas	SEC	11	4																			7	8	4	3	RU	CH	CH	4	CH	3	CH
Ohio State	Big Ten	25	3				9	4	5	8	8	4	5	3	7	8	14	10	5	CH	CH	CH	RU	5	6	5	6	8	12	12		14
Stanford	ACC	20	3						10	9			11			CH	4	RU	9	10	4	6	4	6	4	4	RU	RU	CH	RU	CH	RU
Virginia	ACC	28	2	4	3	RU	3	7	4	6	7	RU		RU	5	4	CH	6	CH	5	5	5	3	11	5	10	5	9	10	13	9	4
Harvard	Ivy League	19	1		7	7	10	8	11	CH	10	6		11	9	14		14	12	11	13	14				14					13	
Princeton	Ivy League	29	-	RU	6	4	6	5	7	7	6	5	3	8	12	10	3	4	4	3	6	12	7	10	9	7	12	3	3	4	6	6
Michigan	Big Ten	25	-		5	5	5	RU	8	4	3	8				9	11	13	RU	12	8	10	10	3	7	3	4	10	11	7	11	12
Yale	Ivy League	23	-	5					6	10	RU	7	10	4	4	3	6	11	10	8		9	11	7	8	8		5	5	8	RU	5
Wisconsin	Big Ten	17	-			10					11	12	8		10	13	7	9	11	16	16	13	9	9	15	15	14					
Washington State	Pac-12	14	-							12	9		4		8		13	12		14	14	8	12	14	14		15					
USC	Big Ten	13	-									11		5		11	8	5	6	4	10	15	14		12			15	16			
Michigan State	Big Ten	13	-			8	8		9	11	12	10	6		6	6	9	7	16													
Northeastern	CAA	12	-																		18	18	18	17	19	19	19	20	18	18	19	18
Gonzaga	Pac-12	10	-																	19		17	16	19	18	20	20	18	19	17		
Syracuse	ACC	10	-						12														13	13	16		10	17	13	11	12	9
Jacksonville	Metro	10	-																		22	22	22	22	22			22	22	22		22
Navy	Patriot	9	-																	20		21	19	20	17	17	18		21			
Indiana	Big Ten	9	-																		11	11	15	12	13	12			17	15	14	
Boston University	Patriot	9	-			9	7	10												18	20							19		19	20	19
Rhode Island	Atlantic 10	9	-																	21			21		21	21	21	21		20	21	20
Rutgers	Big Ten	8	-	6																						11	7	13	15	14	8	11
Tennessee	SEC	8	-										12	9	11		16										17			3	5	3
Notre Dame	ACC	7	-										9	12					15	13	9	16		16								
UCF	Big 12	7	-																			19	20	18	20	18					15	16
Duke	ACC	6	-																				17			16	16	16	14	16		
Dartmouth	Ivy League	5	-	8	8											16		16													16	
UMass	MAC	5	-		4																21	20		21								21
Oregon State	Pac-12	5	-	7												15												14			18	17
Iowa	Big Ten	4	-					9																15	11	13						
UCLA	Big Ten	4	-														12		8	9	12											
Clemson	ACC	3	-													12	15	15														
Marist	Metro	3	-																	22						22	22					
SMU	ACC	4	-																								11	12	9	21		
Penn	Ivy League	4	-																									11	6	10	16	
Cornell	Ivy League	2	-																13	15												
Oklahoma	SEC	2	-																	17	19											
Minnesota	Big Ten	1	-											6																		
San Diego	West Coast	1	-																		15											
Louisville	ACC	1	-																		17											
Alabama	SEC	1	-																								13					
George Washington	Atlantic 10	1	-																										20			
Fairfield	Metro	1	-																												22	
Miami	ACC	1	-																													13
Columbia	Ivy League	1	-																													15

=== Prior Championships ===
The first women’s collegiate championship was held in 1980 at Oak Ridge, Tennessee. National champions were declared from the varsity eight race. California won the first collegiate championship. Below is a list of Women’s National Collegiate varsity eight champions:

- 1996 – Brown
- 1995 – Princeton
- 1994 – Princeton
- 1993 – Princeton
- 1992 – Boston University
- 1991 – Boston University
- 1990 – Princeton
- 1989 – Cornell
- 1988 – Washington
- 1987 – Washington
- 1986 – Wisconsin
- 1985 – Washington
- 1984 – Washington
- 1983 – Washington
- 1982 – Washington (AIAW champion)
- 1981 – Washington
- 1980 – California

(Source: Washington Crew Press Guide)

Prior to 1980, college boats entered the National Women’s Rowing Association National Championships (what is now the USRowing National Championships). Below is a list of NWRA open eights champions from 1971–79 (no eights prior to 1971). The top college finisher is in parentheses:

- 1979 – Burnaby BC (top college Yale)
- 1978 – Burnaby BC (top college Wisconsin)
- 1977 – Vesper Boat Club (top college Wisconsin)
- 1976 – College Boat Club (top college Wisconsin)
- 1975 – University of Wisconsin
- 1974 – Vesper Boat Club (top college Radcliffe)
- 1973 – Radcliffe College
- 1972 – College Boat Club (top college Washington)
- 1971 – Vesper Boat Club (top college Washington)

== Winning crews ==
=== I Eight ===
- 1997 — Sabina Telenska, Denni Nessler, Kelly Horton, Katy Dunnet, Annie Christie, Jan Williamson, Tristine Glick, Kari Green, Alida Purves (cox), Head Coach: Jan Harville
- 1998 — Sabina Telenska, Denni Nessler, Kelly Horton, Katy Dunnet, Annie Christie, Rachel Dunnet, Vanessa Tavalero, Kari Green, Missy Collins (cox), Head Coach: Jan Harville
- 1999 — Caroline Grogan, Erin Kelley, Amy Meyers, Nina Carter, Kellie Walker, Anda Adams, Rachel Anderson, Portia Johnson (Portia McGee), Kate Saul (cox), Head Coach: John Murphy
- 2000 — Portia Johnson (Portia McGee), Rachel Anderson, Anda Adams, Kellie Walker, Jessica Lanning, Liane Malcos, Erin Kelley, Caroline Grogan, Kate Saul (cox), Head Coach: John Murphy
- 2001 — Annabel Ritchie, Nicole Rogers, Carrie Stasiak, Adrienne Hunter, Rika Geyser, Anna Mickelson, Nicole Borges, Lauren Estevenin, Mary Whipple (cox), Head Coach: Jan Harville
- 2002 — Lauren Estevenin, Annabel Ritchie, Anna Mickelson, Heidi Hurn, Adrienne Hunter, Carrie Stasiak, Kara Nykreim, Yvonneke Stenken, Mary Whipple (cox), Head Coach: Jan Harville
- 2003 — Sarah Marvel, Courtney Brown, Caryn Davies, Anna Brock, Lis Lambert, Heather Schofield, Caroline Fisher, Tasha Pasternack, Julie Gluck (cox), Head Coach: Liz O'Leary
- 2004 — Deborah Dryer, Meg Anderson, Catherine Starr, Karen Prazar, Rachel Dearborn, Natalia Obolensky, Marie Walcott, Gillian Almy, Mira Mehta (cox), Head Coach: John Murphy
- 2005 — Jelena Djukic, Kaylan Vander Schilden, Laura Terheyden, Kim Atkinson, Iva Obradović, Erin Reinhardt, Mara Allen, Erin Cafaro, Remy Hitomi (cox), Head Coach: Dave O'Neill
- 2006 — Caroline Lind, Kristin Haraldsdottir, Jackie Zider, Devan Darby, Andréanne Morin, Carrie Kruse, Genevra Stone, Kathleen Bertko, Elizabeth Agnew (cox), Head Coach: Lori Dauphiny
- 2007 — Rachel Jeffers, Tess Gerrand, Christine Geiser, Jamie Redman, Taylor Ritzel, Amanda Rich, Alice Henly, Christine Glandorf, Emily Cleveland (cox), Head Coach: Will Porter
- 2008 — Taylor Ritzel, Christina Person, Tess Gerrand, Jamie Redman, Alice Henly, Maren McCrea, Caroline Nash, Christine Glandorf, Mia Kanak (cox), Head Coach: Will Porter
- 2009 — Erika Roddy, Di Eaton, Elle Logan, Grace Luczak, Julie Smith, Lindsay Meyer, Michelle Vezie, Adrienne Fritsch, Jenna Levy (cox), Head Coach: Yasmin Farooq
- 2010 — Taylor Ritzel, Tess Gerrand, Alice Henly, Maren McCrea, Caroline Nash, Catherine Hart, Stephanie Madner, Dara Dickson, Mia Kanak (cox), Head Coach: Will Porter
- 2011 — Lauren Wilkinson, Kelsey Reelick, Emily Reynolds, Michaela Strand, Heidi Robbins, Kelly Pierce, Molly Hamrick, Ashton Brown, Lila Flavin (cox), Head Coach: Lori Dauphiny
- 2012 — Keziah Beall, Martha Kuzzy, Kristine O'Brien, Sarah Cowburn, Fiona Schlesinger, Susanne Grainger, Hemingway Benton, Carli Goldberg, Sidney Thorsten (cox), Head Coach: Kevin Sauer
- 2013 — Agatha Nowinski, Erica Rippe, Paparangi Hipango, Kara Kohler, Jenn Helssen, Kendall Chase, Maggie Simpson, Clair Premzic, Rachel Ersted (cox), Head Coach: Dave O'Neill
- 2014 — Claire-Louise Bode, Holly Norton, Catherine Shields, Stephanie Williams, Ashley Bauer, Eelkje Miedema, Elodie Ravera, Aina Cid Centelles, Victoria Lazur (cox), Head Coach: Andy Teitelbaum
- 2015 — Rachel Engel, Aina Cid Centelles, Anna Ralph, Stephanie Williams, Ashley Bauer, Sarah Davis, Catherine Shields, Holly Norton, Sami Jurofsky (cox), Head Coach: Andy Teitelbaum
- 2016 — Sarah Davis, Catherine Shields, Stephanie Williams, Anne Dietrich, Cassandra Johnson, Anna Ralph, Alice Riley, Rachel Engel, Sarah Asad (cox), Head Coach: Andy Teitelbaum
- 2017 — Chiara Ondoli, Elise Beuke, Brooke Pierson, Katy Gillingham, Brooke Mooney, Tabea Schendekehl, Jessica Thoennes, Annemieke Schanze, Phoebe Marks-Nicholes (cox), Head Coach: Yasmin Farooq
- 2018 — Charlotte Wesselman, Mia Croonquist, Juliane Faralisch, Dana Moffat, Chloe Betts, Maddison Brown, Sydney Payne, Bea Bliemel, Hannah Christopher (cox), Head Coach: Al Acosta
- 2019 — Carmela Pappalardo, Jennifer Wren, Valentina Iseppi, Teal Cohen, Marlee Blue, Sofia Asoumanaki, Calina Schanze, Tabea Schendekehl, Marley Avritt (cox), Head Coach: Yasmin Farooq
- 2021 — Kate Knifton (Stroke), Fran Raggi, Alex Watson, Aspa Christodoulidis, Daisy Mazzio-Manson, Anna Jensen, Susan Temming, Lisa Gutfleisch (Bow), Rachel Rane (Cox), Head Coach: Dave O'Neill
- 2022 — Kate Knifton (Stroke), Fran Raggi, Aspa Christodoulidis, Etta Carpenter, Anna Jensen, Susan Temming, Sophie Calabrese, Lisa Gutfleisch (Bow), Rachel Rane (Cox), Head Coach: Dave O'Neill
- 2023 — Luise Bachmann (Stroke), Rachel Miller (Cox), Celia Dupre, Annabelle Bachmann, Lucy Burrell, Annika Jeffery, Azja Czajkowski, Katelin Gildersleeve, Lettie Cabot
- 2024 — Mette Nielsen (Stroke), Carly Legenzowski (Cox), Kathia Nitsch, Anna Jensen, Etta Carpender, Marg van der Wal, Abigail Dawson, Cassandre Korvink-Kucinski Amber Harwood (1) Head Coach: Dave O'Neill
- 2025 — Violet Barletta (Stroke), Sofia Garcia (Cox), Nicole Martinez, Mia Levy, Harriet Drake-Lee, Imogen Cabot, Maya Meschkuleit, Christina Bourmpou, Alexa von der Schulenberg, Head Coach: Will Porter
- 2026 — Imogen Grey (Stroke), Amy Werner (Cox), Lucy Searle, Ilva Boone, Maya Meschkuleit, Marg van der Wal, Phoebe Wise, Abigail Dawson, Rhiannon Luke, Head Coach: Dave O'Neill

== See also ==
- Intercollegiate Rowing Association
- Intercollegiate Women's Varsity Eights
- Intercollegiate Rowing Association Women's Varsity Lightweight Eights Champions
- NCAA Division II Rowing Championship
- NCAA Division III Rowing Championship
