= Selaković =

Selaković (Serbian Cyrillic: Селаковић, pronounced [sêlaːkoʋitɕ]) is a Serbian surname. It may refer to:

- Stefan Selaković (born 1977), Swedish former footballer
- Nikola Selaković (born 1983), Serbian politician
- Nikola Selaković (born 1995), Serbian rower
- Petronije Selaković (fl. 1648), Serbian Orthodox monk and Venetian irregular military commander
