= 2012 World Rowing Championships =

International rowing event

- Location: Plovdiv, Bulgaria
- Dates: 15 to 19 August

The 2012 World Rowing Championships were World Rowing Championships that were held from 15 to 19 August 2012 at Plovdiv, Bulgaria. The annual week-long rowing regatta is organized by FISA (the International Rowing Federation), and held at the end of the northern hemisphere summer. Because the 2012 Summer Olympics was the major rowing event in 2012, the programme was limited to non-Olympic events, and the World Rowing Junior Championships were held at the same time.

== Medal summary ==
=== Men's events ===
Event:	Gold:	Time	Silver:	Time	Bronze:	Time
M2+	Belarus; Stanislau Shcharbachenia; Aliaksandr Kazubouski; Piotr Piatrynich (c)	6:55.33	France; Michael Molina; Benjamin Lang; Benjamin Manceau (c)	6:55.93	Canada; Kai Langerfeld; Peter McClelland; Dane Lawson (c)	6:56.61
Men's lightweight events
LM1x	Denmark; Henrik Stephansen	6:56.41	Hungary; Péter Galambos	6:57.50	United States; Andrew Campbell Jr	6:57.88
LM4x	Poland; Adam Sobczak; Mariusz Stańczuk; Artur Mikołajczewski; Miłosz Jankowski	5:55.03	Greece; Georgios Konsolas; Nikolaos Afentoulis; Panagiotis Magdanis; Eleftherios Konsolas	5:56.74	China; Liang Yangyang; Guo Yang; Fa Guofeng; Kong Deming	5:57.12
LM2-	Italy; Luca De Maria; Armando Dell'Aquila	6:37.11	Netherlands; Arnoud Greidanus; Joris Pijs	6:37.18	France; Jean-Christophe Bette; Fabien Tilliet	6:39.88
LM8+	Germany; Matthias Schömann-Finck; Jost Schömann-Finck; Martin Kühner; Jonas Schützeberg; Christian Hochbruck; Jochen Kühner; Bastian Seibt; Lars Wichert; Martin Sauer (c)	5:44.10	Italy; Jiri Vlcek; Catello Amarante; Salvatore Di Somma; Davide Riccardi; Livio La Padula; Martino Goretti; Andrea Caianiello; Matteo Pinca; Gianluca Barattolo (c)	5:46.78	China; Ke Feng; Meng Yulja; Wang Jiahai; Shi Shuai; Zheng Xiaoyun; Hou Zhenwei; Li Qiang; Zhao Jingbin; Wang Minjian (c)	5:47.85

=== Women's events ===
Event:	Gold:	Time	Silver:	Time	Bronze:	Time
Women's lightweight events
LW1x	Greece; Alexandra Tsiavou	7:32.37	Austria; Michaela Taupe-Traer	7:37.04	Belarus; Alena Kryvasheyenka	7:38.93
LW4x	Poland; Magdalena Kemnitz; Jaclyn Halko; Agnieszka Renc; Weronika Deresz	6:36.17	Denmark; Helene Olsen; Sarah Juergensen; Christina Pultz; Sarah Christensen	6:37.82	Italy; Giulia Pollini; Enrica Marasca; Elena Coletti; Erika Bello	6:39.13

=== Event codes ===
	Single sculls	Double sculls	Quadruple sculls	Coxless pair	Coxless four	Coxed pair	Coxed four	Eight
Men's						M2+		
Lightweight men's	LM1x		LM4x	LM2-				LM8+
Lightweight women's	LW1x		LW4x					

== Medal table ==
Rank	Nation	Gold	Silver	Bronze	Total
1	Poland	2	0	0	2
2	Italy	1	1	1	3
3	Denmark	1	1	0	2
3	Greece	1	1	0	2
5	Belarus	1	0	1	2
6	Germany	1	0	0	1
7	France	0	1	1	2
8	Austria	0	1	0	1
8	Hungary	0	1	0	1
8	Netherlands	0	1	0	1
11	China	0	0	2	2
12	Canada	0	0	1	1
12	United States	0	0	1	1
Totals (13 entries)		7	7	7	21
