= Siering =

Siering is a German surname. Notable people with the surname include:

- Constanze Siering (born 1991), German rower
- Lauri Siering (born 1957), American swimmer
