= Magnaghi =

Magnaghi is an Italian surname. Notable people with the surname include:

- Alberto Magnaghi (born 1941), Italian scholar of urban planning;
- Debora Magnaghi (born 1970), Italian voice actress;
- Sara Magnaghi (born 1993), Italian rower;
- Simone Magnaghi (born 1993), Italian footballer.

The name may also refer to:

- Ammiraglio Magnaghi, hydrographic survey vessel in service with Italian Navy, named after admiral Giovan Battista Magnaghi (1839–1902).

== See also ==
- Magnago (disambiguation)
