= Cristina Grigoras =

Cristina Grigoras may refer to:

- Cristina Elena Grigoraş, Romanian artistic gymnast
- Cristina Grigoraș, Romanian rower
