= Nadja Drygalla =

German rower

Nadja Drygalla (born 31 March 1989 in Rostock) is a German rower who competed at the 2012 Summer Olympics.

She won Junior World championship silver in the women's pairs (in 2007 with Ulrike Sennewald) and bronze in the women's eight (2006). At under-23 level, she won bronze in the women's pair in 2010 with Anne-Sophie Agarius.

== Controversy ==
During the 2012 Summer Olympics, The Guardian stated that her boyfriend was a leading member of the Rostock National Socialists, a far-right wing group inclined towards Neo-Nazism, and was a candidate for the National Democratic Party at the Mecklenburg-Vorpommern state election, 2011.

Drygalla had already finished competing as part of the women's rowing eight team, her only event. She left of her own accord after a 90-minute conversation with officials from the German Olympic delegation. In a public statement she distanced herself from far-right views.
