= DSR Proteus-Eretes =

D.S.R. Proteus-Eretes (Dutch: Delftse Studenten Roeivereniging Proteus-Eretes)
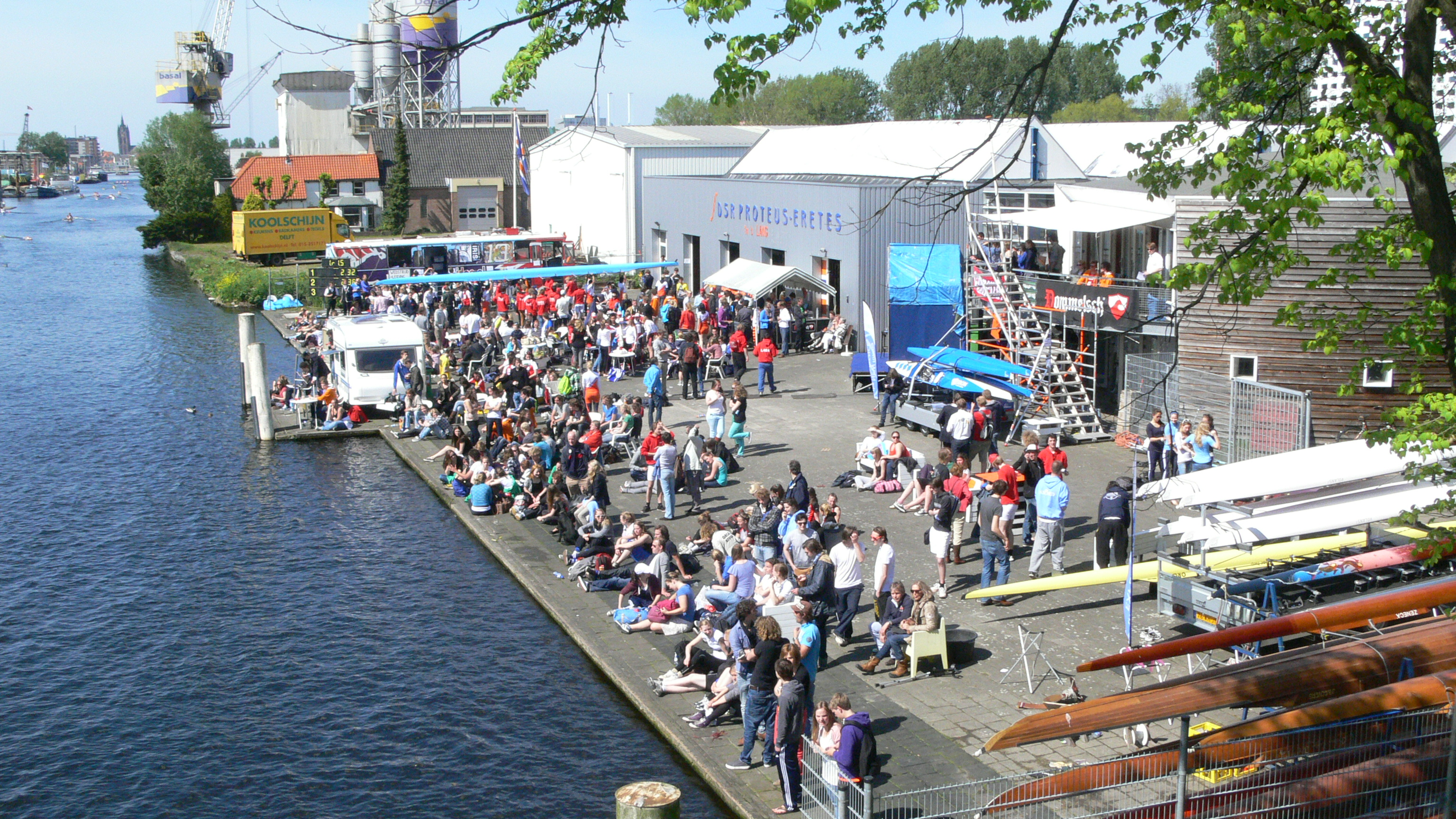

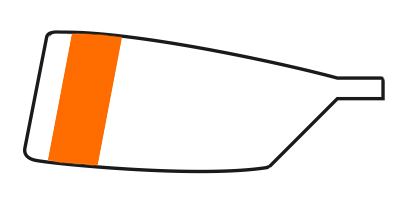
- Location: Delft, Netherlands
- Founded: Merger of VRV Proteus and DSR Eretes in 1970
- Membership: 866
- University: TU Delft
- Website: https://www.proteus-eretes.nl

Notable members
- Sytske de Groot, Ido Akkerman and Chantal Achterberg (Bronze - 2012 Summer Olympics)

DSR Proteus-Eretes (Dutch: Delftse Studenten Roeivereniging - Delft Student Rowing Club) is a student rowing club in Delft, Netherlands, with more than 850 members.

Proteus-Eretes has a fleet of more than 100 rowing boats, which is the largest number of boats owned by a student rowing club in the Netherlands.

About 60 members of Proteus-Eretes are racerowers, who train to reach a worldclass level of rowing and start competing at a high level instantly. In 2012, 5 members competed at the 2012 Summer Olympics, and Sytske de Groot and Chantal Achterberg won bronze medals as a part of women's eight team. The other members are more recreational rowers, but also have the opportunity to compete in a competitive environment. During the season they can participate in competitions almost every weekend.

== History ==
Proteus-Eretes is a result of a fusion between two student rowing clubs, VRV Proteus and DSR Eretes. VRV (Virgilius Roei Vereniging) Proteus was founded in 1947 by Gerrit Athmer and was at first a rowing club only for members of Sanctus Virgilius. Other students were not granted membership of Proteus.

In 1966 DSR Eretes was founded as a student rowing club open to all students. DSR Eretes was growing at a very fast rate whereas Proteus was struggling to survive. Because of problems with Sanctus Virgilius and a shortage of new members, Proteus became an open rowing club in 1969. In 1970 a fusion with Eretes followed, forming DSR Proteus-Eretes.
