= Phoebe Stanley =

Australian rower (born 1985)

Personal information
- Born: 17 October 1985 (age 40) Geelong, Victoria

Sport
- Country: Australia
- Sport: Rowing
- Event(s): Coxless pair (W2-); Coxless four (W4-)

Achievements and titles
- Olympic finals: London 2012 W8+
Medal record
Women's rowing
Representing Australia
World Rowing Championships
Bronze medal – third place	2007 Munich	W4-
World Rowing U23 Championships
Bronze medal – third place	2006 Hazewinkel	W2-

Phoebe Stanley (born 17 October 1985) is an Australian rower. She was a ten-time Australian national champion, including four victories as the stroke of Victorian state Queen's Cup winning eights. She won medals at world championships and represented Australia at the 2012 Summer Olympics in rowing.

== Personal ==
Stanley was born on 17 October 1985 in Geelong. She was educated at Wallington Primary School and The Geelong College in Victoria before studying for a Bachelor of Science at the University of Melbourne from 2004 to 2007. She dealt with a heart arrhythmia in 2011. In 2012, she lived in the Melbourne suburb of St. Kilda.

== Club and state rowing ==
Stanley is a rower competing in pairs and doubles races. Her senior club rowing has been from the Melbourne University Boat Club.

Stanley first represented for her state of Victoria in the 2005 youth eight contesting the Bicentennial Cup at the Interstate Regatta within the Australian Rowing Championships. She stroked that Victorian eight to victory. In 2007 she was selected in the Victorian senior women's eight to compete for the Queen's Cup at the Interstate Regatta. She raced in eight successive victorious Victorian Queen's Cup eights from 2007 to 2014 including the emphatic 2008 13 sec margin victory. She stroked those crews in 2007, 2010, 2011 and 2012.

In Melbourne University colours she contested national championship titles at the Australian Rowing Championships on a number of occasions. She stroked a Melbourne Uni crews to the open women's eight championship and the open women's coxless pair title at the 2011 Australian Rowing Championships in West Lakes, Australia.

== International representative rowing ==
Stanley's Australian representative debut was in 2006 at the World Rowing U23 Championships in Hazewinkel, Belgium. She raced in the Australian eight (to a fifth placing) and in a coxless pair with Katelyn Gray to a bronze medal. In 2007 she was elevated to the Australian senior women's squad. She competed at the World Rowing Cups I and II in Europe before racing at the 2007 World Rowing Championships in Munich in the coxless four to a bronze medal.

In the lead up to the 2008 Summer Olympics Stanley was in contention for the Australian eight. She raced in the two seat of the eight at the World Rowing Cup I in Munich but for the World Rowing Cup II in Lucerne she and Robyn Selby Smith were pushed into a coxless pair. For the 2008 Beijing Olympics Selby-Smith and Stanley were beaten out of the bow end of the eight by Pauline Frasca and Brooke Pratley. Following non-selection, she considered quitting the sport. She returned to Australian representative crews in 2010 competing in the coxless pair with Sarah Tait at the World Rowing Cup III in Lucerne before racing to a fourth placing with Tait at the 2010 World Rowing Championships in Lake Karapiro. In 2011, she finished seventh in the coxless pair at the 2011 World Cup III in Lucerne, Switzerland. She missed the 2011 World Rowing Championships because of health problems.

In 2012 Stanley was vying for a seat in Australia's coxless pair for the Olympics but was beaten out by Tait and Kate Hornsey. Crews were selected in March and Rowing Australia initially decided not to send a women's eight to the 2012 Summer Olympics but this decision was reversed, a squad of ten was selected and soon after Stanley secured her seat at stroke in the Australian women's eight. She led them to victory (and Olympic qualification) in a qualification event in Lucerne; a fifth placing at the World Rowing Cup III in Munich, Germany and fourth place at the World Rowing Cup II in Lucerne, Switzerland. Prior to going to London, she participated in a training camp at the Australian Institute of Sport European Training Centre in Varese, Italy. At the London Olympics, she stroked the Australian eight to a second placed in their heat, final qualification through a repechage and then to sixth place in the Olympic final.
