= Jonas Schützeberg =

German lightweight rower (born 1984)

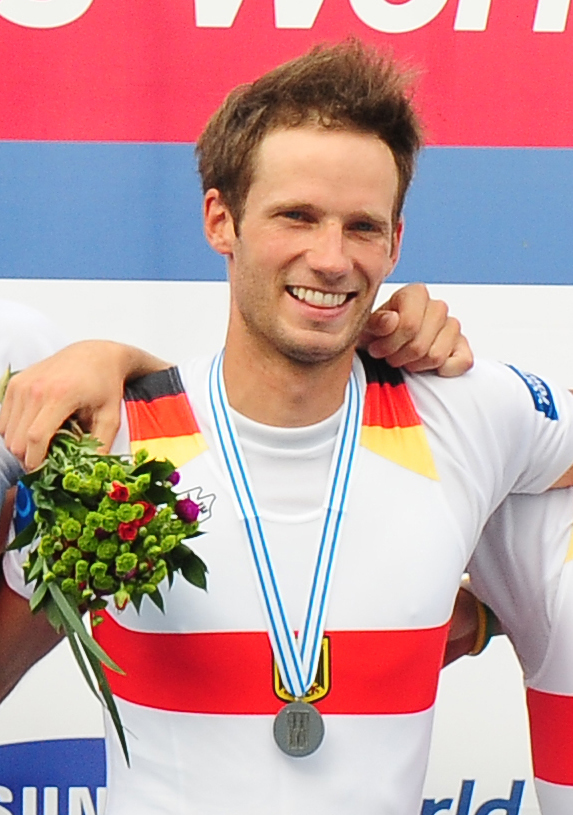
- Schützeberg in 2013

Personal information
- Born: 13 June 1984 (age 42)

Sport
- Sport: Rowing
Medal record
Men's rowing
Representing Germany
World Rowing Championships
Gold medal – first place	2012 Plovdiv	Lwt eight
Silver medal – second place	2008 Ottensheim	Lwt eight
Silver medal – second place	2011 Bled	Lwt quad scull
Silver medal – second place	2013 Chungju	Lwt quad scull

Jonas Schützeberg (born 13 June 1984) is a German lightweight rower. He won a gold medal at the 2012 World Rowing Championships in Plovdiv with the lightweight men's eight.
