= Mariusz Stańczuk =

Polish rower

Personal information
- Born: 23 March 1983 (age 43)

Sport
- Sport: Rowing
Medal record
Men's rowing
Representing Poland
World Rowing Championships
Gold medal – first place	2012 Plovdiv	Lwt quad scull
Bronze medal – third place	2006 Dorney	Lwt eight

Mariusz Stańczuk (born 23 March 1983) is a Polish lightweight rower. He won a gold medal at the 2012 World Rowing Championships in Plovdiv with the lightweight men's quadruple scull.
