= Leopoldo Sansone =

Italian male rower

Personal information
- National team: Italy
- Born: 12 March 1987 (age 39) Naples, Italy
- Height: 1.83 m (6 ft 0 in)
- Weight: 89 kg (196 lb)

Sport
- Sport: Rowing
- Club: Italia C.R.V.
- Start activity: 2003
Medal record
Event	1st	2nd	3rd
European Championships	0	1	0

Leopoldo Sansone (born 12 March 1987) is an Italian male rower, medal winner at senior level at the European Rowing Championships.
