= Tess Gerrand =

Australian rower (born 1988)

Personal information
- Nationality: Australian
- Born: 19 February 1988 (age 38) Sandringham, Victoria
- Height: 184 cm (72 in) (2012)
- Weight: 83 kg (183 lb) (2012)

Sport
- Country: Australia
- Sport: Rowing
- Club: Sydney Rowing Club

Achievements and titles
- Olympic finals: London 2012 W8+
- National finals: Queen's Cup 2011-12

Tess Gerrand (born 19 February 1988) is an Australian former national representative rower. She is a national champion, an Olympian who competed at the 2012 Summer Olympics, was a competitor at the 2013 World Rowing Championships and a medallist at World Rowing Cups in 2013.

== Personal ==
Gerrand was born on 19 February 1988 in Sandringham, Victoria. She competed at 184 centimetres (72 in) tall and weighed 83 kilograms (183 lb).

She attended Cundletown Primary School before Taree High School and finished at Pymble Ladies College. From 2006 to 2010, she attended Yale University, where she earned a Bachelor of Liberal Arts in economics. From 2012, she lived in Johns River, New South Wales.

== Varsity, club and state rowing ==
While studying in the USA she rowed for Yale University. As a member of the Yale eight, she won the NCAA Championships in 2007, 2008 and 2010. In 2007, the Yale crew won the championship in the 2 km race with a time of 5mins 48secs. While at Yale, she was an All-American from 2006 to 2010. In 2008, she won the World Indoor Rowing championship in the collegiate and open divisions with a personal best time of 6mins 43.2 secs in one race.

Back in Australia, Gerrand's senior rowing was from the Sydney Rowing Club. Gerrand raced in SRC colours contesting the women's eight event at the 2011 Australian Rowing Championships. In 2012 she contested the women's coxed pair and won the women's coxless four title at the Australian Championships. In 2013 she contested the women's coxed pair title at the Australian Rowing Championships.

She first made state selection for New South Wales in the 2011 women's eight contesting the Queen's Cup at the 2011 Interstate Regatta. She made another New South Wales Queen's Cup appearance in 2012.

== International representative rowing ==
Gerrand had her first call up to the Australian national rowing team in 2012 when selected in the women's eight attempting to qualify for the 2012 Olympics. The eight named themselves the "Motley Crew". and began their campaign with an Olympic qualification regatta in Lucerne. With Gerrand rowing in the five seat, the Australian women's eight set a time of 6 min 12.36 secs and qualified for the London Olympics. They raced in Europe to a fourth place in World Cup II in Lucerne and fifth-place finish at World Cup III in Munich and participated in a training camp at the Australian Institute of Sport European Training Centre in Varese, Italy. Ultimately the crew was disappointed with their sixth-place finish at the London 2012 Olympic regatta.

In 2013 Gerrand was back in the Australian senior women's sweep squad and that year she raced in the green and gold at all international representative regattas. At the World Rowing Cup in Sydney she raced in the Australian women's eight to a gold medal and also won bronze in a coxless pair with Katrina Bateman. Then at both the WRC II in Eton Dorney and the WRC III in Lucerne, Gerrand and Bateman rowed to seventh placings in the coxless pair. At the 2013 World Rowing Championships in Chungju, Korea Gerrand and Bateman rowed in both the coxless pair (to twelfth place) and in the women's eight to a fifth-place finish.
