= Teodora Gîdoiu =

Romanian rower (born 1986)

Personal information
- Full name: Talida-Teodora Gîdoiu
- Born: 12 January 1986 (age 40) Orșova, Romania
Medal record
Women's rowing
Representing Romania
World Championships
Silver medal – second place	2009 Poznań	W8+
Bronze medal – third place	2010 Karapiro	W8+
European Championships
Gold medal – first place	2008 Marathon	W8+
Gold medal – first place	2009 Brest	W8+
Gold medal – first place	2010 Montemor-o-Velho	W8+
Gold medal – first place	2011 Plovdiv	W8+
Gold medal – first place	2012 Varese	W8+

Talida-Teodora Gîdoiu (born 12 January 1986 in Orșova) is a Romanian rowing cox. She finished 4th in the eight at the 2012 Summer Olympics.
