= Renee Chatterton =

Australian rower (born 1989)

Personal information
- Nicknames: Ren, Swimmer
- Nationality: Australian
- Born: 21 August 1989 (age 37) Adelaide
- Height: 185 cm (73 in) (2012)
- Weight: 78 kg (172 lb) (2012)

Sport
- Country: Australia
- Sport: Rowing
- Club: Adelaide University Rowing Club

Achievements and titles
- Olympic finals: London 2012 W8+
Medal record
World Rowing Championships
Silver medal – second place	2011 Bled	W4-

Renee Chatterton (born 21 August 1989, Belair) is an Australian rower. She was selected to represent Australia at the 2012 Summer Olympics in rowing.

== Personal ==
Nicknamed Ren and Swimmer, Chatterton was born on 21 August 1989 in Adelaide. She is from the Blackwood of Adelaide area. When she was young, she was a swimmer. She went to school at St John's Grammar, Belair, and Highgate Primary School in South Australia before going to high school at Concordia College in South Australia. She enrolled at Flinders University in South Australia in 2011, where she worked on a Bachelor of Education/Health Science. As of 2012, she lives in Adelaide.

On 24 May 2016, Ben Manifold, Acting Principal of Wilderness School, announced that Chatterton was appointed Director of Rowing at Wilderness School.

Chatterton is 185 centimetres (73 in) tall and weighs 78 kilograms (172 lb).

== Swimming ==
Chatterton competed at the Australian National Swimming Championships where she medalled and trained with the national team. She quit the sport in 2009.

== Rowing ==
Chatteron took up rowing in 2009 and competes in women's quads and eights events. She is a member of the Adelaide University Rowing Club.

Chatterton finished 2nd in the four event at the 2011 World Championships in Bled, Slovenia. She finished 3rd in the quad event at the 2011 Australian Rowing Championships in West Lakes, Australia and finished 5th in the eight event at the 2012 World Cup 3 in Munich, Germany. She finished 4th in the eight event at the 2012 World Cup 2 in Lucerne, Switzerland. As a member of the eights crew over the 2000 metres course, she helped set a time of 6 minutes 12.36 seconds which qualified her and the rest of the team for the 2012 Olympics.

Chatterton was selected to represent Australia at the 2012 Summer Olympics in rowing in the eight person boat. Rowers in the eight boat have nicknamed their team the "Motley Crew". She earned selection on the boat after a battle between ten women for eight spots. Prior to going to London, she participated in a training camp at the Australian Institute of Sport European Training Centre in Varese, Italy. She was seated at two in the eight's Olympic campaign at 2012 London – the crew were disappointed with their 6th-place finish.
