= Elizabeth Patrick =

Australian rowing cox

Lizzy Patrick
Personal information
- Born: Melbourne, Australia
- Education: MLC Melbourne
- Years active: 1998–2014
- Height: 155 cm (61 in) (2012)
- Weight: 50 kg (110 lb) (2012)

Sport
- Sport: Rowing
- Club: Melbourne Uni Boat Club

Achievements and titles
- Olympic finals: Beijing 2008 W8+ London 2012 W8+
Medal record
Women's rowing
Representing Australia
World Rowing Championships
Gold medal – first place	2005 Gifu, Japan	W8+
Bronze medal – third place	2006 Eton, England	W8+

Elizabeth "Lizzy" Patrick (born 2 March 1985) is an Australian rowing coxswain – a national champion, world champion and a dual Olympian. From 2005 to 2014 she was the prominent coxswain in Australian women's rowing, steering every Australian representative senior women's eight raced at a premier international regatta in that decade.

== Personal ==
Born in Melbourne, Australia Patrick attended Canterbury Primary School and Methodist Ladies' College, Melbourne. From 2003 to 2006 she took a degree in Exercise and Sport Science at Deakin University. Patrick is 155 centimetres (61 in) tall, weighs 50 kilograms (110 lb) and is married to rowing coach Peter Kupcis.

== Club and state rowing ==
Patrick took up coxing at school at Methodist Ladies' College, Melbourne. Her senior club rowing was from the Melbourne University Boat Club.

Patrick's first state representative selection came in 2004 to the Victorian youth eight contesting the Bicentennial Cup at the Interstate Regatta within the Australian Rowing Championships. Patrick was selected in Victorian senior women's eights to contest the Queen's Cup at the Australian Championships on nine consecutive occasions from 2005 to 2014. She steered all nine of those crews to victory.

In Melbourne University colours she coxed eights contesting the women's heavyweight national Australian titles at the Australian Rowing Championships from 2005 to 2010. She was in the stern of a composite Victorian eight who won that title in 2009.

== International representative rowing ==
Patrick's first Australian representative selection was as coxswain to the Australian senior women's eight in 2005. They performed at the World Rowing Cups I and II in Europe before travelling to Gifu, Japan where at the 2005 World Rowing Championships they won the gold and a World Championship title. For the next three years the Australian women's eight was at least half-filled with Victorian rowers from that state's champion Queens Cup crews and Patrick too kept a hold on her seat and on the rudder ropes of that senior representative boat.

She steered the Australian eight's campaign at two 2006 World Rowing Cups in Europe before the 2006 World Rowing Championships at Eton, Dorney where they beat Germany in the first heat for a place in the final. They went on to finish third and win bronze. In 2007 Patrick was again in the stern at both Rowing World Cups and for the World Championships. She called their races to a fifth place at World Cup I and fourth at the World Cup II. At the 2007 World Championships in Munich she steered them to a fourth placing.

Prospects looked good for the Australian women's eight in the 2008 Olympic year. They won at the World Rowing Cup I in Munich and finished second at World Rowing Cup II in Lucerne with Patrick on the box in both campaigns. However at Beijing in 2008 in spite of expectations, the crew steered by Patrick, finished sixth overall. In the lead up to the Beijing Games, she carried the Olympic torch as it passed through Australia.

From 2009 to 2011 Patrick remained Australian's most successful female coxswain steering consistent domestic Queen's Cup wins, however in those years no Australian heavyweight senior women's eight was sent to a World Championship or World Rowing Cup regatta. The eight selected for the 2012 Olympics named themselves the "Motley Crew". and began their campaign with an Olympic qualification regatta in Lucerne. With new stroke Phoebe Stanley and Patrick communicating at the stern end, the Australian women's eight set a time of 6 min 12.36 secs and qualified for the London Olympics. They raced in Europe to a fourth place in World Cup II in Lucerne and fifth at World Cup III in Munich and participated in a training camp at the Australian Institute of Sport European Training Centre in Varese, Italy. Ultimately the crew was disappointed with their sixth-place finish at the London 2012 Olympic regatta.

Patrick kept competing at the elite level after the London Olympics and coxed the 2013 Australian women's senior eight who raced in a home World Rowing Cup in Sydney toa first placing. That crew was selected for the 2013 World Rowing Championships in Chungju Korea and placed fifth. Lizzy's final Australian representative appearance was in 2014 in the women's eight who raced at the World Rowing Cup III and then contested the 2014 World Rowing Championships. They placed tenth overall.
