= Christian Hochbruck =

German rower (born 1989)

Personal information
- Born: 1 August 1989 (age 36)

Sport
- Sport: Rowing
Medal record
Men's rowing
Representing Germany
World Rowing Championships
Gold medal – first place	2012 Plovdiv	Lwt eight

Christian Hochbruck (born 1 August 1989) is a German lightweight rower. He won a gold medal at the 2012 World Rowing Championships in Plovdiv with the lightweight men's eight.
