= Claudia Belderbos =

Dutch rower (born 1985)

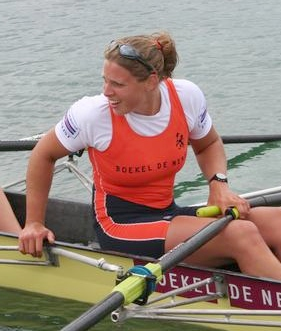
- Belderbos in 2009

Personal information
- Born: 23 January 1985 (age 41) Doorn, the Netherlands
- Education: Utrecht University
- Height: 175 cm (5 ft 9 in)
- Weight: 72 kg (159 lb)

Sport
- Sport: Rowing
- Event: Eights
- Club: AUSR Orca
- Coached by: Josy Verdonkschot

Achievements and titles
- Olympic finals: 2012, 2016
Medal record
Women's rowing
Representing the Netherlands
Olympic Games
Bronze medal – third place	2012 London	Eight
World Championships
Bronze medal – third place	2009 Poznań	Eights
European Rowing Championships
Silver medal – second place	2010 Montemor	Eights
Silver medal – second place	2015 Poznań	Eights
Silver medal – second place	2016 Brandenburg	Eights

Claudia Belderbos (born 23 January 1985) is a Dutch rower who mostly competes in the eights. She won bronze medals at the 2009 World Championships and 2012 Olympics, placing sixth in 2016. She also collected two silver medals at the European championships in 2015–2016.

Belderbos took up rowing in 2008 and started competing internationally in 2009. She has a degree in child psychology from the Utrecht University.
