= Irina Dorneanu =

Romanian rower (born 1990)

Personal information
- Born: 3 March 1990 (age 36) Suceava, Romania
Medal record
Women's rowing
Representing Romania
European Championships
| Gold medal – first place | 2014 Belgrade | W8+ |
| Gold medal – first place | 2013 Sevilla | W8+ |
| Gold medal – first place | 2012 Varese | W8+ |
| Gold medal – first place | 2011 Plovdiv | W8+ |
| Bronze medal – third place | 2015 Poznan | W8+ |

Irina Dorneanu (born 3 March 1990 in Suceava) is a Romanian rower. She finished 4th in the eight at the 2012 Summer Olympics.

She was also part of the Romanian women's eights who won the European championships in 2011, 2012, 2013 and 2014, and won bronze in 2015.
