= Sarah Cook (rower) =

Australian rower (born 1985)

Personal information
- Born: 4 February 1985 (age 41) Ipswich, Queensland

Achievements and titles
- Olympic finals: London 2012 W8+
Medal record
Women's rowing
Representing Australia
World Rowing Championships
Silver medal – second place	2010 New Zealand	Four
Bronze medal – third place	2006 Eton	Eight
World Rowing Cup
Gold medal – first place	2007 Linz	Coxless pair
Bronze medal – third place	2006 Munich	Eight
Bronze medal – third place	2007 Amsterdam	Coxless pair

Sarah Ann Patricia Cook (born 4 February 1985 in Ipswich, Queensland) is an Australian former representative rower. She was a six-time national champion and a dual Olympian who represented at senior World Rowing Championships from 2006 to 2011. Since competitive retirement she has been a rowing coach, commentator and a sports administrator at the highest levels. She has been a board member and since 2021, the Chief Operating Officer of Rowing Australia. Since 2022 she has been a member of the World Rowing Council representing Oceania. She is the Chief Executive Officer of Rowing Australia, and a World Rowing Council member.

== Club and state rowing ==
Cook was raised in Canberra in the Australian Capital Territory and educated at St Clare's College, Canberra. Her senior club rowing was initially with the Canberra Rowing Club and later from the Sydney University Boat Club.

She first made state selection for the ACT in the 2006 senior women's eight contesting the Queen's Cup at the Interstate Regatta within the Australian Rowing Championships. She made further Queen's Cup appearances in 2007, 2008, and 2010.

In 2006 in Canberra Rowing Club colours, Cook won her first national championship title in a composite coxless four. In 2007, Cook and her new pairs partner Kim Crow won the women's pair national title at the Australian Rowing Championships.

At the 2008 Australian Rowing Championships which doubled as Olympic selection trials Cook and Crow backed up their defence as national champions in the W2- by dominating the A final. Cook and Crow then stroked two competing fours, Cook in a composite crew and Crow in the Melbourne University Boat Club crew to win silver and gold respectively. The results were reversed in the W8+ final with Cook in a composite crew winning gold and Crow winning silver. The results speak of the versatility of these two rowers, their underlying competitiveness and ability to stay relaxed and comfortable, either rowing with or against each other.

The 2009 Australian Rowing Championships showed testament to her versatility with Cook securing bronze in the women's single scull contesting the Nell Slatter Trophy in the Interstate Regatta. in 2010 wearing Sydney University Boat Club colours Cook combined with Crow, Sally Kehoe and Kerry Hore to claim gold in the quad at the national championships and won bronze in both the women's eight and in a double scull with Hore.

== International rowing career ==
Cook made her Australian representative debut at the U23 World Rowing Championships held in Poznan, Poland (then known as the Nation's Cup) in a women's coxless four. The crew won silver. The following year Cook competed in the same event at the U23 World Championships hosted in Amsterdam, the Netherlands. Days before the regatta, she fell ill with a throat infection and had barely recovered before racing commenced. The crew finished sixth. 2005 ended with an invitation to the join the Australian senior women's squad at the Australian Institute of Sport. Cook suffered a broken sternum in a motor vehicle accident which kept her off the water for two months, but still won selection into the Australian senior women's eight for the 2006 World Rowing Championships at Eton Dorney, UK, where the women's eight won a bronze medal.

In 2007, Cook and Crow gained selection for Australia in the pair and in the eight. In the pair they won gold at World Rowing Cup I in Linz, Austria and bronze at WRC II in Amsterdam and Cook also raced in the eight at both regattas. Then Cook and Crow went on to place fourth in both the eight and the pair at the 2008 World Rowing Championships in Munich, Germany. In doing so they qualified both boats for Australia for the 2008 Beijing Olympics.

The final Olympic selection trials were held in February 2008. Cook and Crow achieved selection in the Australian coxless pair for the Beijing Olympics where they placed tenth.

Cook and Crow again impressed selectors in 2009 and led the field to secure selection as the Australian pair for the 2009 World Rowing Championships in Poland. Cook and Crow went on to place fifth at the championships in their first international race back since the 2008 Beijing Olympics. In 2010 Cook raced in the women's pair with Sarah Tait at WRC II and III and then competed in the women's four at the 2010 World Rowing Championships on Lake Karapiro in New Zealand where she won silver.

In 2011 Cook made the switch to sculling and was selected in the Australian women's quad scull to compete at the Henley Royal Regatta, the World Rowing Cup III in Lucerne, and the 2011 World Rowing Championships. In 2012, Cook's final year of international representation she moved back into the Australian women's eight. She rowed in the four seat at Olympic Qualification regatta in Bled, Slovenia; at a World Rowing Cup in the Olympic lead-up and at the 2012 London Olympics where the crew finished in sixth place. It was Cook's last rowing international appearance.

== Sailing career ==
Cook represented on the Australian sailing squad for three years from 2013 to 2015 in the 470 and 49erFX classes. In 2013 Cook and her sailing partner, Beijing Olympic gold medallist Elise Rechichi, won the national title in the 470 Class. They finished eighth at the 2013 World Titles.

== Career after competition ==
Since competitive retirement Cook has coached school rowing at PLC Sydney, Wesley College Melbourne, St Joseph's College, Hunters Hill, Kinross Wolaroi School and Canberra Grammar School. She became a board member at Sydney University Sport & Fitness, Rowing NSW, Baseball Australia and from 2016 a councillor, then board member at Rowing Australia. In 2022 she took on the role of Chief Operating Officer of Rowing Australia.

Cook is a World Rowing Broadcast Commentator and was a 2019 race steward at the Henley Royal Regatta. Since 2022 she has been a member of the World Rowing Council representing Oceania.

Inaugural inductee to University of Canberra Sport Walk of Fame in 2022.
