= Piotr Juszczak =

Polish rower (born 1988)

Personal information
- Born: 3 July 1988 (age 37) Kalisz, Poland

Sport
- Sport: Rowing
Medal record
Representing Poland
World Championships
Bronze medal – third place	2014 Amsterdam	M8+
European Rowing Championships
Silver medal – second place	2010 Montemor-o-Velho	M8+
Silver medal – second place	2013 Sevilla	M8+

Piotr Juszczak (born 3 July 1988) is a Polish rower. He competed in the Men's eight event at the 2012 and 2016 Summer Olympics.
