= Schoemann =

Schoemann is a surname. Notable people with the surname include:

- Georg Friedrich Schoemann (1793–1879), German classical scholar of Swedish heritage
- Gloria Schoemann (1910–2006), Mexican film editor
- Jost Schoemann-Finck (born 1982), German rower
- Hermann Schoemann (1881–1915), German Naval officer killed in World War I
- Matthias Schoemann-Finck (born 1979), German rower
- Roy Schoemann (1914–1972), center in the National Football League

== See also ==
- German destroyer Z7 Hermann Schoemann, Type 1934A-class destroyer built for Nazi Germany's Kriegsmarine in the mid-1930s
- Schoeman
