= Agnieszka Renc =

Polish rower

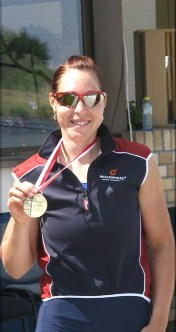
- Renc in 2010

Medal record

Women's rowing

Representing Poland

World Championships
Gold medal – first place	2012 Plovdiv	LW4x
Silver medal – second place	2009 Poznań	LW2x

European Championships
Silver medal – second place	2009 Brest	LW2x
Silver medal – second place	2010 Montemor-o-Velho	LW2x

Agnieszka Renc (born 9 January 1986 in Warsaw) is a competitive rower from Poland.

== Competitions ==
- 2009 World Rowing Championships
- 2012 World Rowing Championships
- 2009 European Rowing Championships
- 2010 European Rowing Championships
