= Yasmin Tredell =

British rower

Personal information
- Born: 18 November 1992 (age 33) Worcester, Worcestershire, England

Sport
- Country: United Kingdom
- Sport: Rowing
- Club: Oxford University Boating Club; Gloucester Rowing Club; Molesey Boating Club
Medal record
Rowing
Representing United Kingdom
World U23 Championships
Silver medal – second place	2013 Linz Ottensheim	Women's eights
World Junior Championships
Gold medal – first place	2010 Racice	Junior women's eights
European Championships
Bronze medal – third place	2012 Varese	Women's eights

Yasmin Tredell (born 18 November 1992) is a British rower who competed in international events in the women's eights in both senior and junior levels.
