= Gianluca Barattolo =

Italian rowing cox (born 1978)

Personal information
- Born: 3 July 1978 (age 47) Naples, Italy
Medal record
Men's rowing
Representing Italy
World Championships
Gold medal – first place	2005 Gifu	LM8+
Silver medal – second place	1998 Cologne	M2+
Silver medal – second place	2001 Lucerne	M4+
Silver medal – second place	2004 Banyoles	LM8+
Silver medal – second place	2007 Munich	M2+
Silver medal – second place	2011 Bled	LM8+
Silver medal – second place	2012 Plovdiv	LM8+
Silver medal – second place	2014 Amsterdam	LM8+

Gianluca Barattolo (born 3 July 1978 in Naples) is an Italian rowing cox. He is currently a federal rowing instructor at the Sabaudia National Nautical Center.
