= Adam Sobczak =

Polish rower

Personal information
- Born: 14 December 1989 (age 36)

Sport
- Sport: Rowing
Medal record
Men's rowing
Representing Poland
World Rowing Championships
Gold medal – first place	2012 Plovdiv	Lwt quad scull

Adam Sobczak (born 14 December 1989) is a Polish lightweight rower. He won a gold medal at the 2012 World Rowing Championships in Plovdiv with the lightweight men's quadruple scull.
