= Magnago (disambiguation) =

Magnago may refer to:

- Magnago, a municipality in the Metropolitan City of Milan, Lombardy, Italy;
- Cassano Magnago, a municipality in the province of Varese, Lombardy, Italy;
  - Cassano Magnago HC, a handball club based in Cassano Magnago.

People with the surname include:

- Silvius Magnago (1914–2010), Italian lawyer and politician;
- Vittorio Magnago Lampugnani (born 1951), Italian architect and professor emeritus;
- Walter Magnago (born 1960), Italian former racing cyclist.

== See also ==
- Magnaghi
