= Camelia Lupașcu =

Romanian rower (born 1986)

Personal information
- Full name: Camelia Gabriela Lupașcu
- Born: 29 July 1986 (age 39) Dorohoi, Romania
Medal record
Women's rowing
Representing Romania
World Championships
Silver medal – second place	2005 Gifu	W8+
Silver medal – second place	2009 Poznań	W2-
Silver medal – second place	2009 Poznań	W8+
Silver medal – second place	2013 Chungju	W8+
Bronze medal – third place	2010 Karapiro	W8+
Junior World Championships
Gold medal – first place	2003 Athens	W4X
Silver medal – second place	2004 Barcelona	1X
European Rowing Championships
Gold medal – first place	2008 Athens	W8+
Gold medal – first place	2009 Brest	W2-
Gold medal – first place	2009 Brest	W8+
Gold medal – first place	2010 Montemor-o-Velho	W8+
Gold medal – first place	2010 Montemor-o-Velho	W2-
Gold medal – first place	2011 Plovdiv	W2-
Gold medal – first place	2012 Varese	W2-
Gold medal – first place	2013 Sevilla	W8+
Silver medal – second place	2007 Poznań	W4X
Bronze medal – third place	2011 Plovdiv	W4X
Bronze medal – third place	2012 Varese	W4X

Camelia Gabriela Lupașcu (born 29 July 1986 in Dorohoi) is a Romanian rower. She finished 4th in the eight at the 2012 Summer Olympics.
