= Katelyn Gray =

Australian rower (born 1985)

Personal information
- Born: 3 September 1985 (age 40)

Sport
- Country: Australia
- Sport: Rowing
- Event: Coxless four (W4-)
Medal record
Women's rowing
Representing Australia
World Rowing Championships
Bronze medal – third place	2007 Munich	W4-
World Rowing U23 Championships
Bronze medal – third place	2006 Hazewinkel	W2-

Katelyn Gray (born 3 September 1985) is an Australian rower.

== Club and state rowing ==
Gray's senior club rowing was from the UTS Haberfield Rowing Club on Iron Cove in Sydney.

Gray first represented for her state of New South Wales stroking the 2004 youth eight contesting the Bicentennial Cup at the Interstate Regatta within the Australian Rowing Championships. She rowed in the NSW youth eight again in 2005. In 2006 she was selected to stroke the New South Wales senior women's eight to compete for the Queen's Cup at the Interstate Regatta. She raced in three successive New South Wales Queen's Cup eights from 2006 to 2008.

In UTS Haberfield colours she contested national championship titles at the Australian Rowing Championships on a number of occasions. She rowed in composite NSW crews in the open women's eight championship at the 2006 and 2007 Australian Rowing Championships.

== International representative rowing ==
Gray made her Australian representative debut in a coxless four at the 2005 World Rowing Cup III in Lucerne. She then raced in that same four that year at the World Rowing U23 Championships in Amsterdam to a sixth place.

In 2006 Gray competed at the World Rowing U23 Championships in Hazewinkel, Belgium. She raced in the Australian eight (to a fifth placing) and in a coxless pair with Phoebe Stanley to a bronze medal. In 2007 she was elevated to the Australian senior women's squad. She competed at the 2007 World Rowing Championships in Munich in the coxless four to a bronze medal.
