= Laura Schwensen =

German rower

Personal information
- Nationality: German
- Born: 25 July 1991 (age 33); Kappeln, Germany

Sport
- Sport: Rowing

Laura Schwensen (born 25 July 1991) is a German rower. She competed in the women's eight event at the 2012 Summer Olympics.

She was part of the German women's eight that won bronze at the 2010 and 2014 European Championships.
