= Jacobine Veenhoven =

Dutch female rower (born 1984)

Medal record

Women's rowing

Representing the Netherlands

Olympic Games
Bronze medal – third place	2012 London	Eight

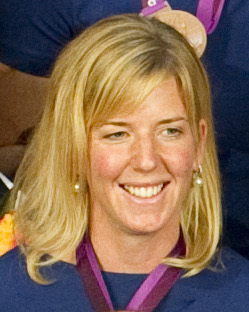
A picture ofJacobine Veenhoven at the Netherlands Olympic Games 2012

Jacobine Veenhoven (born 30 January 1984, Laren) is a Dutch female rower. She won the bronze medal at the 2012 Summer Olympics in the women's eight event.
