= Kathrin Thiem =

German rower

Personal information
- Nationality: German
- Born: 2 July 1988 (age 37) Hanover, West Germany

Sport
- Sport: Rowing

Kathrin Thiem (born 2 July 1988) is a German rower. She competed in the women's eight event at the 2012 Summer Olympics.
