= Nicoleta Albu =

Romanian rower (born 1988)

Personal information
- Born: 10 August 1988 (age 37) Brăila, Romania
Medal record
Women's rowing
Representing Romania
World Championships
Silver medal – second place	2009 Poznań	W2-
Silver medal – second place	2009 Poznań	W8+
Silver medal – second place	2013 Chungjiu	W2−
Silver medal – second place	2013 Chungju	W8+
Bronze medal – third place	2010 Karapiro	W8+
European Championships
Gold medal – first place	2011 Plovdiv	W2-
Gold medal – first place	2012 Varese	W2-
Gold medal – first place	2013 Sevilla	W8+
Gold medal – first place	2014 Belgrade	W8+
Bronze medal – third place	2007 Poznań	W2-
Bronze medal – third place	2011 Plovdiv	W4x
Bronze medal – third place	2012 Varese	W4x

Nicoleta Albu (born 10 August 1988) is a Romanian rower. She finished fourth in the women's eight at the 2012 Summer Olympics.

She has won four World Championship silver medals (women's double sculls 2009 and 2013 and women's eights in 2009 and 2013) and one bronze (women's eights 2010), and four European gold medals (women's double sculls 2011 and 2012 and women's eights in 2013 and 2014) and two bronzes (women's coxed four 2011 and 2012).
