= Janine Hanson =

Canadian rower (born 1982)

Janine Stephens
Personal information
- Full name: Janine Elizabeth Stephens
- Nationality: Canada
- Born: December 14, 1982 (age 43) La Mesa, California
- Height: 1.78 m (5 ft 10 in)
- Weight: 70 kg (150 lb)

Sport
- Events: scull, sweep
- College team: Michigan
- Club: Winnipeg Rowing Club
Medal record
Women's rowing
Representing Canada
Summer Olympics
Silver medal – second place	2012 London	Women's eights
World Championships
Silver medal – second place	2010 Karapiro	W8+
Silver medal – second place	2011 Lake Bled	W8+

Janine Stephens (née Hanson; December 14, 1982) is a former Canadian rower from Winnipeg on the Canadian National team. Stephens won the silver medal at the 2012 Summer Olympics in London as part of the women's eights rowing team. She also has two World Championship silver medals to her credit, also in the women's eights.

== Career ==
Early Career

Stephens began rowing after being invited to try rowing by a former member of the National Rowing Team. At the 2001 Canada Summer Games, she earned two bronze medals and one silver.

College Rowing

From 2002 to 2006, Stephens raced for the University of Michigan in Ann Arbor, Michigan. There, she won two Big 10 Championships and had two top-five finishes at the NCAA Championships. In 2006, she was a First Team All Big 10 Honoree and won the Big 10 Sportsmanship Award.

International Rowing

Her career began as a sculler for Canada and her first major international competition came at the 2008 Summer Olympics. There, she finished in 8th place in the women's quad sculls. Stephens then transitioned to the sweep from the scull, she had not rowed in the sweeping technique since her early college days. This led to her finding success at the 2010 World Rowing Championships, where she won a silver medal in the women's eight. She won the silver medal again in the women's eight 2011 World Rowing Championships. Stephens final competition was during the 2012 Olympic Games as the bow seat in the 8+. Her success in the women's eights ensured her seat at the 2012 Summer Olympics. There at the Eton Lake Rowing Centre she and the rest of the Canadian crew finished in the silver medal position behind the U.S. boat.

Coaching

Leading up to the 2017 Canada Summer Games, Stephens was announced as the head coach for the Manitoba Rowing Association. The Manitoba Team managed 1 Gold, 2 Bronze and 6 total top 5 finishes, a best-ever showing for Manitoba Rowing.

In 2019, Stephens was announced as the winner of Rowing Canada's President's Award for her dedication to the sport of Rowing.

== Personal ==
Stephens was born in the United States to Canadian parents. Her parents returned to Winnipeg when she was two years old. She grew up in Winnipeg and trained for the national team in London, Ontario. Stephens has now retired from competitive rowing, returned to Winnipeg, and was married on February 16, 2013. She has a degree in movement science from the University of Michigan. Upon retiring from competitive rowing, Stephens became the spokesperson for the Manitoba Liquor and Lotteries Commission.

== Honours ==
In 2012 Stephens was awarded the Queen Elizabeth II Diamond Jubilee Medal.
