= Rachelle Viinberg =

Canadian rower (born 1979)

Personal information
- Born: April 30, 1979 (age 47) Nanaimo, British Columbia, Canada
- Height: 6 ft 0 in (1.83 m) (2012)
- Weight: 160 lb (73 kg) (2012)
- Website: www.drviinberg.com

Sport
- Country: Canada
- Retired: 2012
Medal record
Women's rowing
Representing Canada
Olympic Games
Silver medal – second place	2012 London	Women's eights
World Rowing Championships
Silver medal – second place	2002 Seville	W4-
Silver medal – second place	2010 Karapiro	W8+
Silver medal – second place	2011 Lake Bled	W8+

Rachelle Viinberg (née De Jong, born April 30, 1979) is a retired Canadian Olympic rower and naturopathic doctor who resides in Toronto, Ontario. She was a member of the 2004, 2008, and 2012 Canadian Olympic Rowing teams. In 2012, she won her first Olympic medal, a silver, in the Women's Eight rowing event. Her team was beaten by Team USA by 1.4 seconds.

== Early life ==
Viinberg was born in Nanaimo, British Columbia, located on Vancouver Island. She has an older brother named Simon. Her mother, June de Jong (née Mayhew), is an actress, while her father, Hielke de Jong, who died on December 7, 2009, was a retired government employee. Viinberg is of Dutch, English, and Ukrainian ancestry.

At the age of eight, Viinberg and her family moved to Regina, Saskatchewan. She attended Argyle Elementary school and graduated from Sheldon Williams Collegiate in 1997. In school, Viinberg pursued swimming after seeing Calgary Olympian Mark Tewksbury win the 100-metre backstroke at the 1992 Barcelona Olympics. After undergoing a growth spurt in her adolescence, her parents introduced her to rowing.

"They helped me discover rowing after seeing all the rowers train every morning on Wascana Lake when they drove to work. I thought I had nothing to lose, and my 6’0 frame seemed to be the ideal body type," said Viinberg.

== Olympics ==
In 2004, Viinberg made her first Olympic team, where she competed at the Athens Olympic Games. In 2008, Viinberg was selected to compete in the women's quad at the Beijing Olympic Games. With one of the crew members suffering a rib fracture, the team achieved an eighth-place finish.

== Post-rowing career ==
Viinberg graduated from the University of Victoria with a BSc in Biology. She enrolled in a post-graduate program in Naturopathic Medicine at the Canadian College of Naturopathic Medicine. She then started her career in neuropathic medicine.

== Personal life ==
After becoming engaged (on the Great Wall of China) after the 2008 Olympic Games, Viinberg married her husband Alex Viinberg in 2009.

In 2009, Viinberg's father died from leukemia. Eighteen months later, her mother was diagnosed with stage 3C colon cancer. When asked about her mother at the 2012 Olympic Games, Viinberg said, "She battled stage three colon cancer so she could be in the stands to watch me perform my dream. We both achieved our goals."

== Key results ==
- 2012 – 2nd in the W8+, Olympic Games, London, GBR
- 2012 – 1st in the W8+, World Cup, Munich, Germany
- 2012 – 2nd in the W8+, World Cup, Lucerne, Switzerland
- 2011 – 2nd in the W8+, World Championship, Bled, Slovenia
- 2011 – 2nd in the W8+, World Cup, Lucerne, Switzerland
- 2010 – 2nd in the W8+, World Rowing Championships, New Zealand
- 2008 – 8th in the Olympic quad, Beijing, China
- 2007 – 5th in the W4x, World Championships, Munich, Germany
- 2006 – 7th in the W4x, World Championships, Eton, England
- 2004 – Alternate on Olympic team in Athens, Greece
- 2003 – 4th in the W4-, World Championships, Milan, Italy
- 2002 – 2nd in the W4-, World Championships, Seville, Spain
- 2002 – 6th in the W8+, World Championships, Seville, Spain
- 2002 – 4th in the W8+, World Cup, Munich, Germany
- 2001 – 2nd in the W2-, US Nationals, Camden, New Jersey
- 2000 – 1st in the W8+, Women's Henley, Henley-on-Thames, England
- 2000 – 2nd in the W8+, Henley Royal Regatta, Henley-on-Thames, England
- 1997 – 1st in the W4- and 2nd in the W8+, Jeux Canada Games, Brandon, Manitoba
