= Gaia Palma =

Italian rower

Personal information
- National team: Italy
- Born: 8 March 1990 (age 36) Turin, Italy
- Height: 1.76 m (5 ft 9 in)
- Weight: 69 kg (152 lb)

Sport
- Sport: Rowing
- Club: Armida S.C.
- Start activity: 2006
- Coached by: Eusebio Carando and Massimo Prandini
Medal record
Event	1st	2nd	3rd
European Championships	0	1	1

Gaia Palma (born 8 March 1990) is an Italian female rower, medal winner at senior level at the European Rowing Championships.
