= Enrica Marasca =

Italian rower

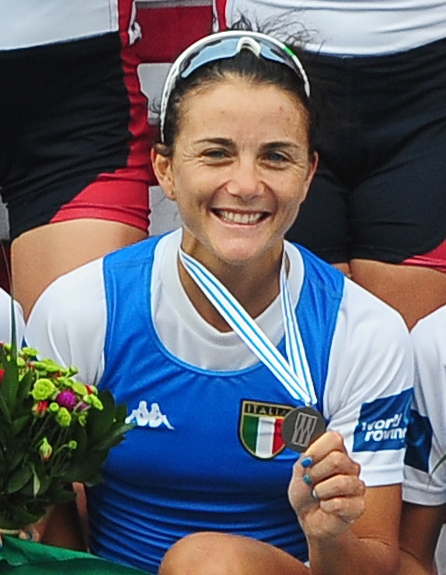
- Marasca in 2013.

Personal information
- National team: Italy
- Born: 10 March 1983 (age 43) Priverno, Italy
- Height: 1.68 m (5 ft 6 in)
- Weight: 59 kg (130 lb)

Sport
- Sport: Rowing
- Club: G.S. Forestale; G.S. Marina Militare
- Coached by: Giovanni Lepore
Medal record
Event	1st	2nd	3rd
World Championships	0	0	2
European Championships	1	1	1
Total	1	1	3

Enrica Marasca (born 10 March 1983) is an Italian lightweight rower twice bronze medal winner at senior level at the World Rowing Championships.

== Achievements ==
Year	Competition	Venue	Rank	Event	Time
2012	World Championships	(Bulgaria) Plovdiv	3rd	Lightweight quadruple sculls	6:39.13
2013	World Championships	(South Korea) Chungju	3rd	Lightweight quadruple sculls	6:57.06
