= Meghan Musnicki =

American rower

Personal information
- Nationality: American
- Born: February 5, 1983 (age 43) Naples, New York, U.S.
- Education: Ithaca College
- Height: 5 ft 11 in (180 cm)
- Weight: 175 lb (79 kg)

Sport
- Country: United States
- Sport: Rowing
- Event: Eight
Medal record
Women's rowing
Representing the United States
Event	1st	2nd	3rd
Olympic Games	2	0	0
World Championships	5	0	1
Total	7	0	1
Olympic Games
Gold medal – first place	2012 London	W8+
Gold medal – first place	2016 Rio de Janeiro	W8+
World Championships
Gold medal – first place	2010 Karapiro	W8+
Gold medal – first place	2011 Lake Bled	W8+
Gold medal – first place	2013 Chungju	W8+
Gold medal – first place	2014 Amsterdam	W8+
Gold medal – first place	2015 Aiguebelette	W8+
Bronze medal – third place	2019 Ottensheim	W8+

Meghan Musnicki (/məˈsnɪki/ mə-SNIK-ee; born February 5, 1983) is an American rower. She is a five-time world champion and twice Olympic champion. She has competed at four Olympics, twice winning gold in the women's eight at the London 2012 and Rio 2016. She has represented at World Rowing Championships six times, all in the W8+, winning gold five times and bronze on one occasion.

She attended Naples Central School District in Naples, New York, and was a guest speaker at the Naples Central School Graduation in 2013, the year after she won her first Olympic gold medal.

Musnicki is a 2005 graduate of Ithaca College.

Musnicki qualified to represent the United States at the 2020 Summer Olympics. She rowed in the seven seat of the US women's eight which finished in overall fourth place. Afterwards she retired, married rowing coach Skip Kielt and got a job in a data infrastructure company. One year later, Musnicki decided to enter the Henley Royal Regatta for fun. Teaming up with Australian Olympian Jessica Morrison, she went through to win the final of the Hambleden Pairs Challenge Cup over the British crew racing as Leander. Realizing she could still compete with full-time athletes, Musnicki went back into training and qualified for the 2024 Summer Olympics.
