= Robyn Selby Smith =

Australian rower

Personal information
- Born: 26 November 1980 (age 45)
- Years active: 2002–2012

Sport
- Sport: Rowing
- Club: Mercantile Rowing Club

Achievements and titles
- Olympic finals: London 2012 W8+
Medal record
Women's rowing
Representing Australia
World Rowing Championships
Gold medal – first place	2005 Gifu	W4-
Gold medal – first place	2005 Gifu	W8+
Gold medal – first place	2006 Eton	W4-
Bronze medal – third place	2006 Eton	W8+

Robyn Selby Smith (born 26 November 1980 in Melbourne) is an Australian former rower. She is a national champion, a three-time world champion and an Olympian whose international success came in sweep-oared heavyweight crews.

== Club and state rowing ==
Selby Smith's senior rowing was from the Mercantile Rowing Club in Melbourne.

She was selected in representative Victorian state eights to compete for the Queen's Cup in the Interstate Regatta at the Australian Rowing Championships on ten occasions between 2002 and 2012. Those Victorian eights were victorious on seven of those occasions. In 2005 and 2006 she was also Victoria's senior sculling representative contesting the Nell Slatter Trophy at those same Australian championships.

In 2011 she won she Australian national quad scull title in an Australian selection composite crew.

== International representative rowing ==
Selby Smith made her first international representative appearance as stroke of Australia's women's coxless four at the 2004 World Rowing Championships in Banyoles, Spain. That crew finished eighth.

2005 was Selby Smith's year. She rowed in the Australian coxless pair and the eight to success at both Rowing World Cups that year in Europe and then was selected in both the eight and the coxless four for the 2005 World Rowing Championships in Gifu, Japan. Both crews were victorious and Robyn Selby Smith finished 2005 as a dual World Champion.

Robyn continued to perform at the highest level in 2006 and was again in the Australian eight and the pair who performed at that year's two Rowing World Cups at Munich and at Poznan. She held her seat in the bow of both the eight and the four for the 2006 World Rowing Championships at Eton Dorney. The eight took the bronze and in the four with Jo Lutz, Amber Bradley and Kate Hornsey, Selby Smith won the gold and won her third World Championship.

In the lead up to the 2007 World Rowing Championships Selby Smith again rowed at both Rowing World Cups in Europe. She was in the pair who finished sixth at Linz Ottensheim and then was in the four and the eight for the second World Cup in Amsterdam. The four won their final. For the World Championships in Munich the selectors had a wealth of women's talent from which to choose given the high and even standard. Selby Smith was selected only in the Australian Women's eight and they finished fourth.

In 2008 Selby Smith was in Olympic contention. She rowed in the Australian eight who took gold at the 1st Rowing World Cup in Munich and then in a pair who placed tenth at the 2nd World Cup in Lucerne. But ultimately she was beaten out to the bow seat of the eight by her Victorian team-mate Pauline Frasca. She took a break from rowing after missing Beijing selection but was back rowing at the highest Australian national level by 2010.

Leading into 2012, she played a vital role in the battle to enable a women's eight to represent Australia for the first time since Beijing. She rowed in the eight at two Rowing World Cup events in Europe that year and in the final successful FISA qualification regatta. She was seated at three in the eight's Olympic campaign at 2012 London – the crew were disappointed with their 6th-place finish. It was Selby Smith last international outing in a stellar representative career.

== Post competitive rowing ==
Selby Smith has been club captain of the Mercantile Rowing Club since 2012. She was an Australian national rowing junior selector in 2013 to 2014. She is a solicitor in Melbourne.
