= Julia Richter (rower) =

German rower

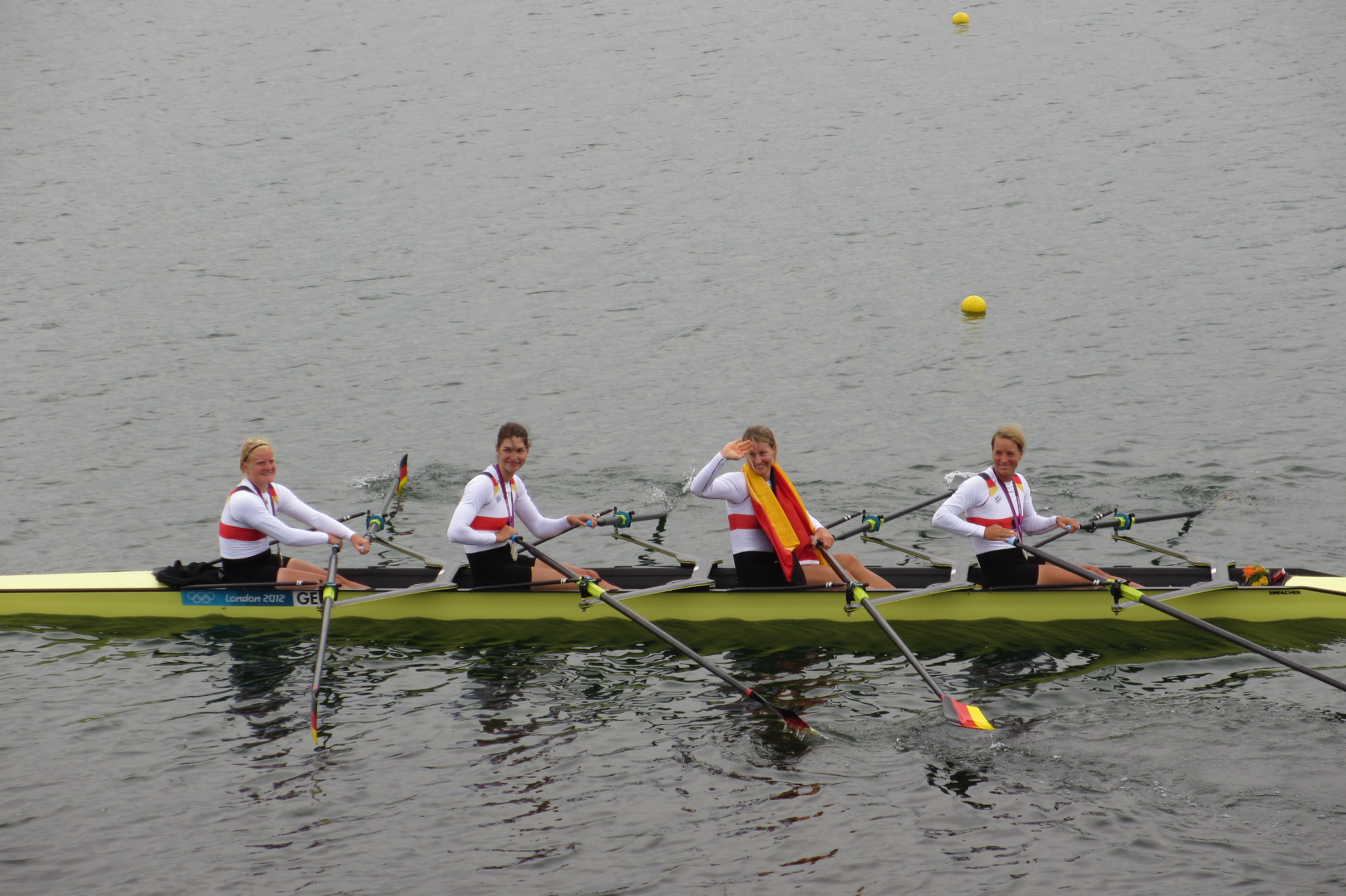
- Carina Baer, Britta Oppelt, Julia Richter and Annekatrin Thiele (alphabetical order, not left to right), with their silver medals from the Women's Quad at the London 2012 Olympic Games.

Personal information
- Born: 29 September 1988 (age 37) Schwedt, Bezirk Frankfurt, East Germany
Medal record
Women's rowing
Representing Germany
Olympic Games
| Silver medal – second place | 2012 London | Quadruple sculls |
World Championships
| Gold medal – first place | 2011 Bled | W4x |
| Gold medal – first place | 2013 Chungjiu | W4x |
| Bronze medal – third place | 2010 Karapiro | W4x |
European Championships
| Gold medal – first place | 2013 Seville | W4x |
| Silver medal – second place | 2010 Montemor-o-Velho | W4x |
| Silver medal – second place | 2014 Belgrade | W4x |
| Bronze medal – third place | 2007 Poznań | W4x |

Julia Richter (born 29 September 1988 in Schwedt) is a German rower.

She was part of the German quadruple sculls team that won a silver medal at the 2012 Summer Olympics.

She, Tina Manker, Stephanie Schiller and Britta Oppelt won the gold medal at the 2011 World Championship, and she, Annekatrin Thiele, Carina Bär and Britta Oppelt won the quadruple sculls at the 2013 World Championships. Her team with Oppelt, Bär and Manker won bronze in 2010.

At European level, she was part of the women's quadruple sculls team that won gold in 2013, silver in 2010 and 2014 and bronze in 2007.

Julia rowed for the UMass Minutewomen in their 2008–09 season. She led them to the program's 13th Atlantic 10 Women's Rowing Championship, a league-record, and made the A10 All-Conference First-Team.
