= Nikola Selaković (rower) =

Serbian rower (born 1995)

Medal record

Men's Rowing

Representing Serbia

European Championships
Bronze medal – third place	2012 Varese	LM4−

European Junior Championships
Gold medal – first place	2013 Minsk	M8+

Nikola Selaković (Serbian: Никола Селаковић, pronounced [nǐkola sêlaːkoʋitɕ], born 25 July 1995 in Smederevo, FR Yugoslavia) is a Serbian rower.
