= Gioia Sacco =

Italian rower

Personal information
- National team: Italy
- Born: 1 February 1988 (age 38) Priverno, Italy
- Height: 1.80 m (5 ft 11 in)
- Weight: 73 kg (161 lb)

Sport
- Sport: Rowing
- Club: G.S. Fiamme Gialle
- Start activity: 1999
- Coached by: Luigi De Lucia
Medal record
Event	1st	2nd	3rd
European Championships	0	1	0

Gioia Sacco (born 1 February 1988) is an Italian rower, a medal winner at the senior level at the European Rowing Championships.
