= Simone Ponti =

Italian rower

Personal information
- National team: Italy
- Born: 11 December 1989 (age 36) Naples, Italy
- Height: 1.91 m (6 ft 3 in)
- Weight: 83 kg (183 lb)

Sport
- Sport: Rowing
- Club: Canottieri Napoli
- Start activity: 2003
Medal record
Event	1st	2nd	3rd
European Championships	0	1	0

Simone Ponti (born 11 December 1989) is an Italian male rower, medal winner at senior level at the European Rowing Championships.
