= Cristina Grigoraș =

Romanian rower (born 1990)

Personal information
- Born: 25 April 1990 (age 36) Huși, Romania
Medal record
Women's rowing
Representing Romania
World Championships
Silver medal – second place	2013 Chungjiu	W8+
European Championships
Gold medal – first place	2011 Plovdiv	W8+
Gold medal – first place	2012 Varese	W8+
Gold medal – first place	2013 Sevilla	W8+
Gold medal – first place	2013 Sevilla	W2-
Silver medal – second place	2014 Belgrade	W2-
Bronze medal – third place	2009 Brest	W4x

Cristina Grigoraș (born 25 April 1990 in Huși) is a Romanian rower. She finished 4th in the eight at the 2012 Summer Olympics.

== Junior career ==
Grigoraș was part of the Romanian junior women's eight who won the 2007 Junior World Championship. She won the silver medal at the 2008 Junior World Championship in the junior women's pair with Andreea Boghian. She also won bronze as part of the Romanian women's quadruple sculls team at the 2010 World U-23 Championship. Grigoraș and Boghian won silver in the women's pair at the 2011 World U-23 Championship.

== Senior career ==
Grigoraș was part of the women's eight that won gold at the 2012 European Championships, and won the women's pair with Boghian. In 2013, Grigoraș and Boghian won the gold medal in the women's pair. That year Grigoraș was part of the Romanian women's eight team that won silver at the World Championships.

In 2014 Grigoraș and Laura Oprea won the silver medal in the women's pair at the European Championships. A year later, the team won the bronze medal at the European Championships.
