= Julia Wärmer =

German rower

Julia Waermer
Personal information
- Native name: Julia Wärmer
- Birth name: Julia Lepke
- Nationality: German
- Born: 16 August 1989 (age 35); Rostock, East Germany

Sport
- Sport: Rowing

Julia Waermer (German: Wärmer, née Lepke, born 16 August 1989) is a German rower. She competed in the women's eight event at the 2012 Summer Olympics.
