= Samantha Molina =

Italian rower

Personal information
- National team: Italy
- Born: 10 October 1982 (age 43) Terracina, Italy
- Height: 1.70 m (5 ft 7 in)
- Weight: 58 kg (128 lb)

Sport
- Sport: Rowing
- Club: G.S. Forestale; G.S. Marina Militare
- Start activity: 1995
Medal record
Event	1st	2nd	3rd
European Championships	0	1	0

Samantha Molina (born 10 October 1982) is an Italian rower, medal winner at senior level at the European Rowing Championships.
