= Krista Guloien =

Canadian rower

Medal record

Women's rowing

Representing Canada

Summer Olympics
Silver medal – second place	2012 London	Women's eights

World Championships
Silver medal – second place	2011 Lake Bled	W8+

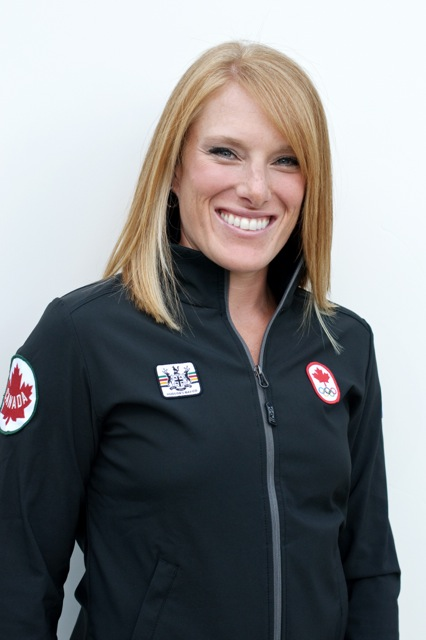
Krista Guloien in 2013

Krista Guloien (born March 20, 1980, in New Westminster, British Columbia) is a Canadian rower from Port Moody, British Columbia.

At the 2008 Summer Olympics, she competed in the women's quad sculls.

At the 2012 Summer Olympics, she was part of the Canadian women's eight that won the silver medal.

She studied criminology at Simon Fraser University.
