= Guido Gravina =

Italian male rower

Personal information
- National team: Italy
- Born: 10 June 1992 (age 34) Turin, Italy
- Height: 1.82 m (6 ft 0 in)
- Weight: 93 kg (205 lb)

Sport
- Sport: Rowing
- Club: Cerea S.C.
- Start activity: 2006
Medal record
Event	1st	2nd	3rd
World Championships	2	1	1
European Championships	0	1	0
Italian Championships	5	6	5
Total	7	8	6

Guido Gravina (born in Turin 10 June 1992) is an Italian male rower, two-time world under 23 champion and winner of medals at senior level at the World Rowing Championships and European Rowing Championships. He also won five Italian Rowing Championships. Sports director at Reale Società Canottieri Cerea since March 2018. Under his direction the Reale Società Canottieri Cerea has won 34 italian championships, 4 gold at the world championships, 6 gold at the european championships, 1 gold at the youth olympic games and other 16 medals at the world and european rowing championships
