= Natalie Mastracci =

Canadian rower (born 1989)

Personal information
- Born: June 5, 1989 (age 37) Welland, Ontario, Canada

Sport
- Country: Canada
- Sport: Rowing
- College team: Syracuse Orange (2008–2013)
Medal record
Women's Rowing
Representing Canada
Olympic Games
| Silver medal – second place | 2012 London | Women's eights |
World Championships
| Silver medal – second place | 2011 Bled | W8+ |
| Silver medal – second place | 2013 Chungju | W4− |
| Silver medal – second place | 2014 Amsterdam | W8+ |
| Bronze medal – third place | 2013 Chungju | W8+ |
| Bronze medal – third place | 2015 Aiguebelette | W8+ |

Natalie Mastracci (born June 5, 1989) is a Canadian rower. She was part of the Canadian team at the 2012 Summer Olympics that won a silver medal in the Women's eight.

== Education ==
Mastracci attended St. Alexander School in Pelham, Ontario and Syracuse University. Mastracci was a member of the Syracuse Orange rowing team from 2008 to 2013.

== Career ==
In June 2016, she was officially named to Canada's 2016 Olympic team.

At World Championship level, she has won silver medals in the women's eight in 2011 and 2014, and bronze medals in 2013 and 2015.
