= Ulrike Sennewald =

German rower

Personal information
- Born: 10 May 1989 (age 37) Rostock, East Germany
- Height: 1.94 m (6 ft 4 in)
- Weight: 84 kg (185 lb)

Sport
- Sport: Rowing
Medal record
Representing Germany
European Rowing Championships
Bronze medal – third place	2010 Montemor-o-Velho	Eights
Silver medal – second place	2013 Seville	Eights

Ulrike Sennewald (born 10 May 1989) is a German rower who had her best achievements in the eights. In this event she won two medals at the European championships of 2010 and 2013 and finished in seventh place at the 2012 Summer Olympics.

Her father Hans competed in the same rowing event at the 1992 Olympics.
