= Sytske de Groot =

Dutch rower (born 1986)

Medal record

Representing the Netherlands

Olympic Games
Bronze medal – third place	2012 London	Eight

World Championships
Bronze medal – third place	2009 Poznań	W8+

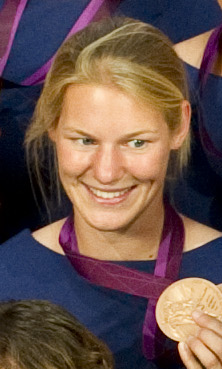
Sytske de Groot's at the meeting of the Dutch Olympians with Prime Minister Mark Rutte in 2012.

Sytske de Groot (born 3 April 1986 in Delft) is a Dutch rower. She competed at the 2012 Summer Olympics where she won the bronze medal in the Women's eight.

As of 2012, she was a student of marine engineering at Delft University of Technology and she was a member of the DSR Proteus-Eretes student rowing club in Delft. As a part of Dutch women's eight team, she was a bronze medalist at the 2009 European Championship and a silver medalist of the 2010 European Championship.
