= Michaela Taupe-Traer =

Austrian rower

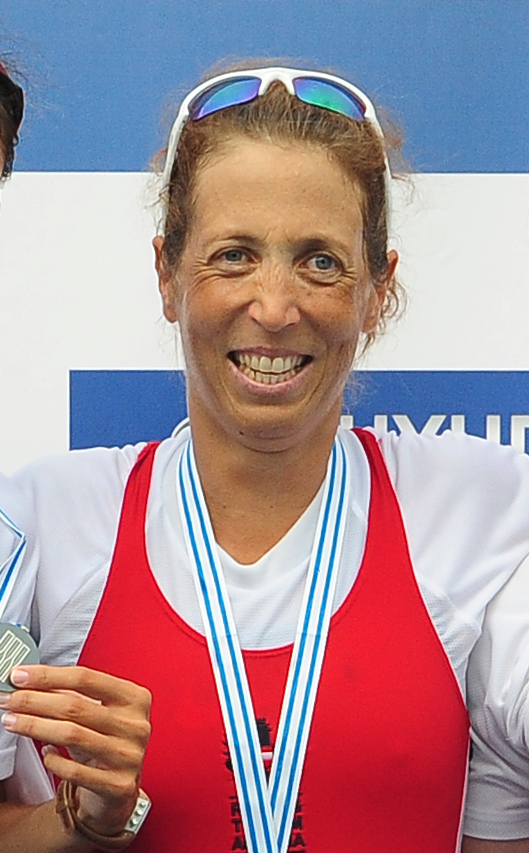
- Taupe-Traer in 2013.jpg

Personal information
- Born: 25 January 1975 (age 51) Klagenfurt, Austria

Sport
- Sport: Rowing
Medal record
Women's rowing
Representing Austria
World Championships
Gold medal – first place	2013 Chungju	LW1x
Silver medal – second place	2012 Plovdiv	LW1x

Michaela Taupe-Traer (born 25 January 1975 in Klagenfurt) is an Austrian rower. In the lightweight single sculls she won the silver medal at the 2012 World Rowing Championships and gold at the 2013 World Rowing Championships.
