= Sara Magnaghi =

Italian rower

Personal information
- National team: Italy
- Born: 30 October 1993 (age 32) Como, Italy
- Height: 1.84 m (6 ft 0 in)
- Weight: 62 kg (137 lb)

Sport
- Sport: Rowing
- Club: Canottieri Moltrasio
- Start activity: 2005
- Coached by: Alberto Tabacco
Medal record
Event	1st	2nd	3rd
European Championships	0	1	1

Sara Magnaghi (born 30 October 1993) is an Italian female rower, medal winner at senior level at the European Rowing Championships.
