= Anne Schellekens =

Dutch rower (born 1986)

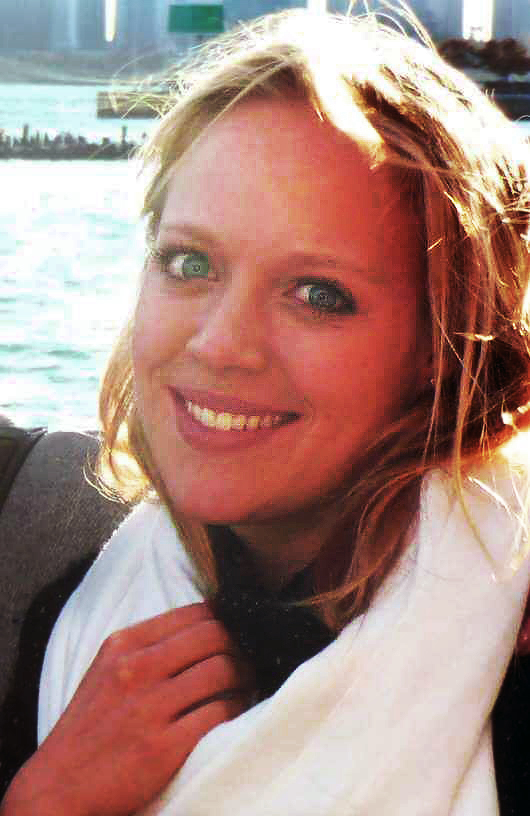

Personal information
- Born: 18 April 1986 (age 40) Rotterdam, Netherlands
Medal record
Women's rowing
Representing the Netherlands
Olympic Games
Bronze medal – third place	2012 London	Women's eight

Anne Schellekens (born 18 April 1986, in Rotterdam) is a Dutch female rower.

She won the bronze medal at the 2012 Summer Olympics in the women's event.

Anne started rowing during her BA history at Utrecht University as a member of Utrecht Student Rowing Society "Triton". She developed her leadership skills as well. Among many positions held during her active membership, her presidency of the Spring Introduction Committee 2006 (lic2006) was the key role contributing to her rise to prominence.
