= Constanze Siering =

German rower

Constanze Siering (born 10 July 1991 in Recklinghausen) is a German rower. She competed at the 2012 Summer Olympics, but did not win a medal. She was part of the German women's eight who won bronze at the 2010 European Rowing Championships.
