= Jamie Redman =

American rower

Medal record

Women's rowing

Representing United States

World Rowing Championships
Gold medal – first place	2010 Karapiro	W8+
Gold medal – first place	2011 Lake Bled	W8+
Silver medal – second place	2009 Poznań	W4-

Jamie Redman (born July 19, 1986 in Spokane, Washington) is an American rower.
