= Carline Bouw =

Dutch rower (born 1984)

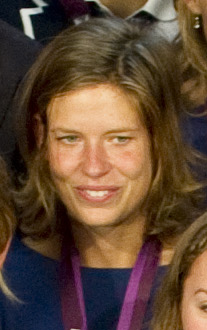
- 2012

Personal information
- Nationality: Dutch
- Born: 14 December 1984 (age 41) Epe, Netherlands
- Height: 184 cm (6 ft 0 in)
- Weight: 72 kg (159 lb)
Medal record
Women's rowing
Representing the Netherlands
Olympic Games
Silver medal – second place	2016 Rio de Janeiro	Quadruple sculls
Bronze medal – third place	2012 London	Eight
World Rowing Championships
Gold medal – first place	2009 Poznań	W4-
Gold medal – first place	2010 Karapiro	W4-
Bronze medal – third place	2009 Poznań	W8+
Bronze medal – third place	2015 Aiguebelette	W4x

Carline Bouw (born 14 December 1984 in Epe) is a Dutch rower.
