= Enikő Barabás =

Romanian rower (born 1986)

Personal information
- Full name: Enikő Barabás-Mironcic
- Born: Enikő Barabás; 21 July 1986 (age 39) Reghin, Romania
Medal record
Women's rowing
Representing Romania
Olympic Games
Bronze medal – third place	2008 Beijing	Eight
European Championships
Gold medal – first place	2008 Marathon	Eight
Gold medal – first place	2011 Plovdiv	Eight
Silver medal – second place	2007 Poznań	Quad scull

Enikő Barabás-Mironcic (born 21 July 1986) is a Romanian rower. She competed at the 2008 Summer Olympics, where she won a bronze medal in women's eight. She had previously been on the team that won a silver medal for Romania at the 2005 World Rowing Championships, also in the eight.

== Personal life ==
Mironcic comes from the Hungarian minority in Romania.
