= Chantal Achterberg =

Dutch rower (born 1985)

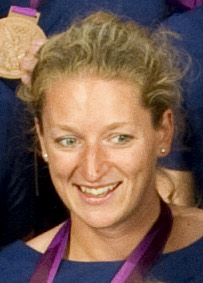
- Achterberg in 2012

Personal information
- Nationality: Dutch
- Born: 16 April 1985 (age 41) Vlaardingen, South Holland, Netherlands
- Height: 172 cm (5 ft 8 in)
- Weight: 72 kg (159 lb)
Medal record
Women's rowing
Representing the Netherlands
Olympic Games
Silver medal – second place	2016 Rio de Janeiro	Quadruple sculls
Bronze medal – third place	2012 London	Eight
World Championships
Gold medal – first place	2009 Poznań	W4-
Gold medal – first place	2010 Karapiro	W4-
Bronze medal – third place	2009 Poznań	W8+
Bronze medal – third place	2015 Aiguebelette	W4x
European Championships
Silver medal – second place	2014 Belgrade	W1x

Chantal Achterberg (born 16 April 1985) is a Dutch rower, who is a multiple time world champion and winner of Olympic silver and bronze medals. She is a native of Vlaardingen, South Holland.
