= Taylor Ritzel =

American rower (born 1988)

Personal information
- Born: September 4, 1988 (age 38) Aurora, Colorado, U.S.
Medal record
Women's rowing
Representing the United States
Olympic Games
Gold medal – first place	2012 London	Women's eight
World Championships
Gold medal – first place	2010 Karapiro	W8+
Gold medal – first place	2011 Lake Bled	W8+

Taylor Ritzel (born September 4, 1988) is an American rower who was part of the United States women's eight team at the 2012 Summer Olympics. The team won an Olympic gold medal. She has also been part of the women's eight world championship winning team twice, in 2010 and 2011.

Ritzel started rowing at Yale University, from which she graduated in 2010. While at Yale, she won the I Eight event three times at the NCAA Championships (2007, 2008, 2010). Taylor is currently working in Beverly Hills in nonfiction series content acquisition at Netflix.
