= Women in Australia =

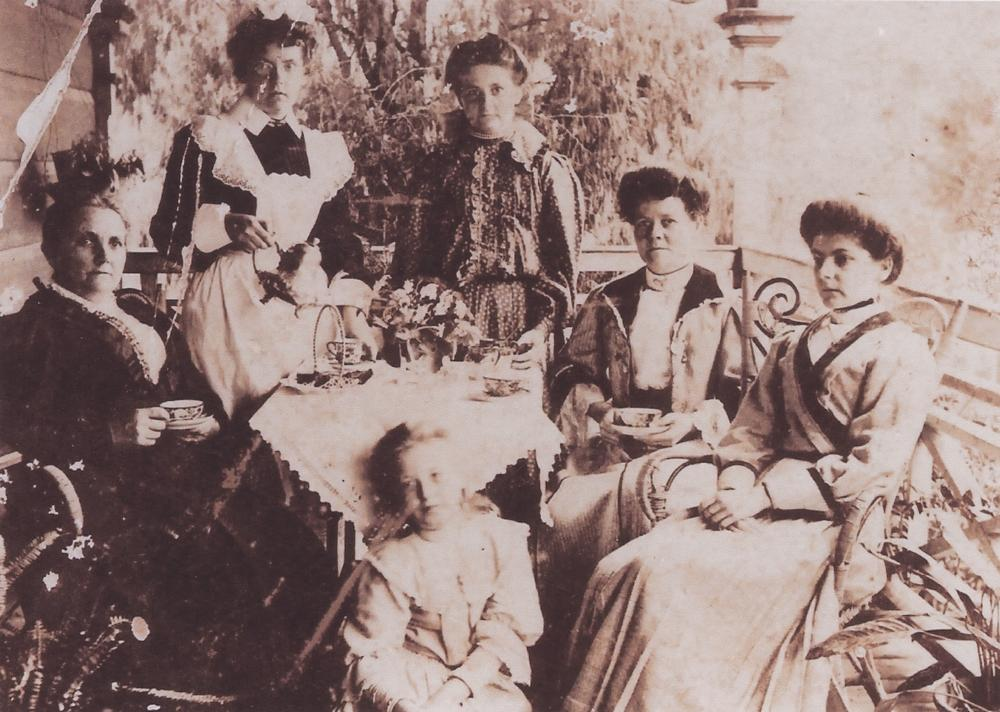
- Australian women having tea on a verandah in 1910

General statistics
- Maternal mortality (per 100,000): 6 (2015)
- Women in parliament: 30.5% (2015)
- Women over 25 with secondary education: 91.4% (2015)
- Women in labour force: 58.6% (2015)

Gender Inequality Index
- Value: 0.073 (2021)
- Rank: 19th out of 191

Global Gender Gap Index
- Value: 0.792 (2025)
- Rank: 13th out of 148

Women in Australia refers to women's demographic and cultural presence in Australia. Australian women have contributed greatly to the country's development, in many areas. Historically, a masculine bias has dominated Australian culture. Since 1984, the Sex Discrimination Act 1984 (Cth) has prohibited sex discrimination throughout Australia in a range of areas of public life, including work, accommodation, education, the provision of goods, facilities and services, the activities of clubs and the administration of Commonwealth laws and programs, though some residual inequalities still persist.

== History ==
=== Colonial New South Wales ===
Year	Males	Females	Total
1788	529	188	717
1790	297	70	367
1800	1,230	328	1,558
1805	1,561	516	2,077
1819	8,920	1,066	9,986
1828	16,442	1,544	17,986
1836	25,254	2,577	27,831
1841	23,844	3,133	26,977

Australia was established in 1788 as a penal colony. The population was predominantly male, with between 1788 and 1792, around 3546 male and 766 female convicts being landed at Sydney. This severe gender imbalance created a lot of social problems. Some of the women engaged in prostitution due to their economic circumstances, and because of the gender imbalance. The colonial administrations were anxious to address the gender imbalance. The first attempt to redress this imbalance was the voyage of the Lady Juliana, a ship chartered to carry only female convicts to New South Wales, but which became notorious on the trip and was nicknamed "the floating brothel". European men would also exchange European goods for sexual services from Aboriginal women.

Women came to play an important role in education and welfare during colonial times. Governor Macquarie's wife, Elizabeth Macquarie took an interest in convict women's welfare. Her contemporary Elizabeth Macarthur was noted for her 'feminine strength' in assisting the establishment of the Australian merino wool industry during her husband John Macarthur's enforced absence from the colony following the Rum Rebellion. The Catholic Sisters of Charity arrived in 1838 and set about providing pastoral care in a women's prison, visiting hospitals and schools and establishing employment for convict women. They established hospitals in four of the eastern states, beginning with St Vincent's Hospital, Sydney in 1857 as a free hospital for all people, but especially for the poor. Many other Irish nuns established hospitals and schools. Caroline Chisholm (1808–1877) established a migrant women's shelter and worked for women's welfare in the colonies in the 1840s. Her humanitarian efforts later won her fame in England and great influence in achieving support for families in the colony. Sydney's first Catholic bishop, John Bede Polding founded an Australian order of nuns—the Sisters of the Good Samaritan—in 1857 to work in education and social work. The Sisters of St Joseph were founded in South Australia by Saint Mary MacKillop and Fr Julian Tenison Woods in 1867. MacKillop travelled throughout Australasia and established schools, convents and charitable institutions. She was canonised by Benedict XVI in 2010, becoming the first Australian to be so honoured by the Catholic Church.

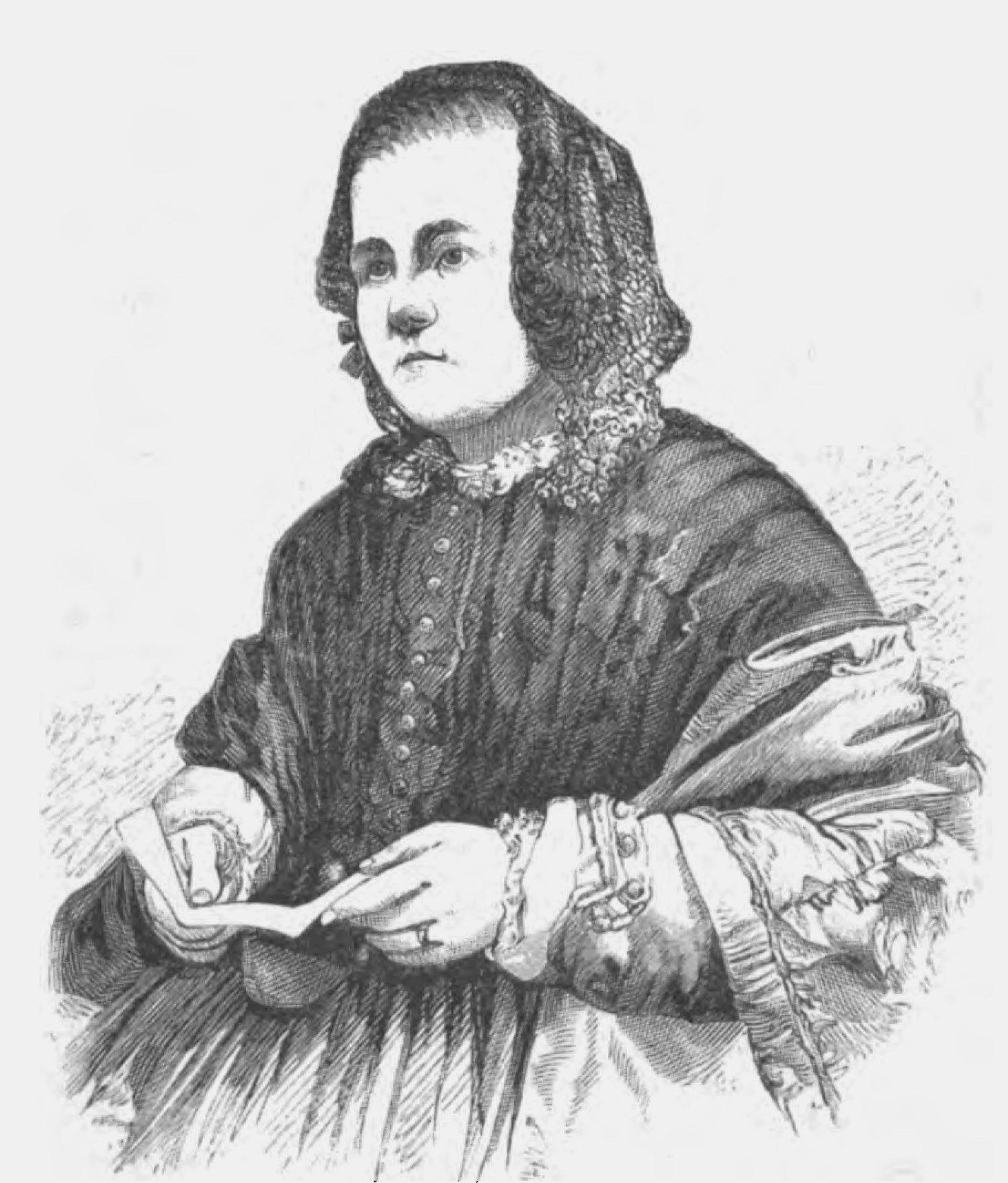
The humanitarian, Caroline Chisholm was a leading advocate for women's issues and family friendly colonial policy.

In December 1883, Bella Guerin was the first woman to graduate from an Australian University, when she graduated Bachelor of Arts (B.A.) at the University of Melbourne. (Note: The University of Adelaide was the first Australian university to admit women as graduating students (in 1876), the University of Melbourne was the second (in 1881), and the University of Sydney was the third (in 1882) (Kirby, J.C. (1889), "Co-Education in Australia", The (Boston) Woman's Journal, Vol.20, No.25, (22 June 1889), p 200.). Bella Guerin, who graduated B.A. at the University of Melbourne in December 1883, was the first woman to graduate from an Australian University; and, in December 1885, she was the first woman to graduate M.A. from an Australian University. In May 1885, Isola Florence Thompson, B.A. and Mary Elizabeth Brown, (B.A.), who had both enrolled in 1882, were the first women to graduate from Sydney University (The Lady Bachelors of Art, The Illustrated Sydney News, (Saturday, 6 June 1885), p. 10.); and, in May 1887 (Candidates for Degrees: Faculty of Arts, The (Sydney) Daily Telegraph, (Monday, 16 May 1887), p. 3), Thompson was the first woman to graduate M.A. from Sydney University. In December 1885, Edith Emily Dornwell, B.Sc. was the first woman to graduate from Adelaide University (Miss Edith Emily Dornwell, The Pictorial Australian, (Saturday, 1 May 1886), p. 70.).)

=== Late 19th-century suffrage ===
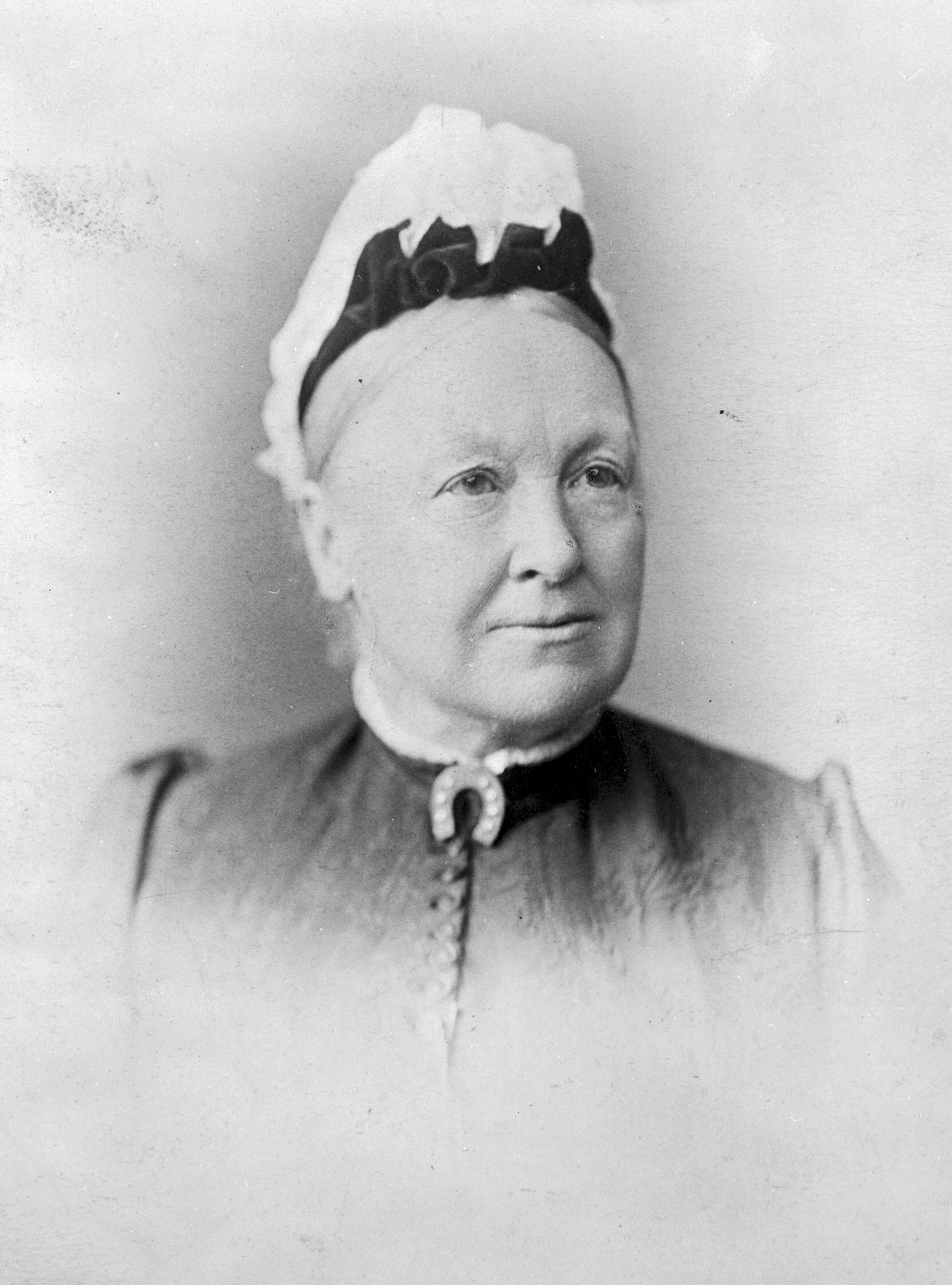
South Australian suffragette Catherine Helen Spence (1825–1910). In 1895 women in South Australia were among the first in the world to attain the vote and were the first to be able to stand for parliament.

Australia had led the world in bringing women's suffrage rights during the late 19th century. Propertied women in the colony of South Australia were granted the vote in local elections (but not parliamentary elections) in 1861. Henrietta Dugdale, Annie Lowe, and Elizabeth Rennick formed the Victorian Women's Suffrage Society, the first suffrage society in Australia in 1884. Women became eligible to vote for the Parliament of South Australia in 1895. This was the first legislation in the world permitting women also to stand for election to political office and, in 1897, Catherine Helen Spence became the first female political candidate for political office, unsuccessfully standing for election as a delegate to the Federal Convention on Australian Federation. Western Australia granted voting rights to qualified non-aboriginal women in 1899.

=== 1901–1945 ===
Women energetically participated in the war effort, with few signs of defeatism or resistance to government policies. In 1922, the Country Women's Association was formed with the intention to improve the lives of women in rural Australia. It has since expanded to become the largest women's organisation in the country.

=== Since 1945 ===
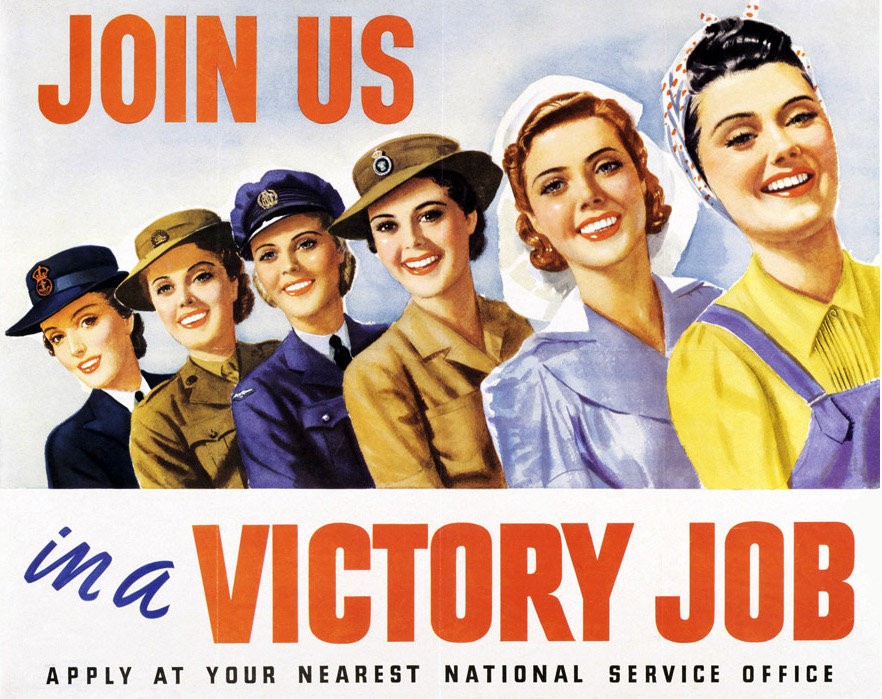
In the Second World War, government propaganda encouraged women to contribute to the war effort by joining one of the female branches of the armed forces or joining the labour force

In 1974, the Commonwealth Court of Conciliation and Arbitration granted women the full adult wage. However, resistance to women being employed in certain industries remained until well into the 1970s. Because of obstruction from elements of the Unions movement, it would take until 1975 for women to be admitted as drivers on Melbourne's trams, and Reg Ansett refused to allow women to train as pilots as late as 1979. In 1984, the Sex Discrimination Act became enforced, making sex-based discrimination and sexual harassment illegal. Criminalization of marital rape in Australia began with the state of New South Wales in 1981, followed by all other states from 1985 to 1992.

=== Analytical writings ===
Until the 1960s, the Australian national character was typically masculine. Only in more recent decades has attention been paid to the role and marginal status of women and minority groups. One of the earliest studies on the role of women in Australian culture was conducted by Miriam Dixson in her 1976 study, The Real Matilda. Dixson concluded that there was deep contempt for women in the Australian ethos and that the only role for women was within the family.

Marilyn Lake argues that the first stage of women's history in the 1970s demonstrated an angry tone, with a revolutionary critique that reflected its close connections with the women's liberation movement. By the late 20th century, women's history was less strident and more thoroughly integrated into social history and labour history. In the 21st century, the emphasis has turned to a broader horizon of "gender relations", which includes such concepts as femininity and masculinity.

== Reproductive rights and health ==
Abortion in Australia was illegal in all circumstances until 1969, when the Menhennitt ruling in the R v Davidson case held that an abortion was legal if the physical or mental health or the life of the woman was endangered. That principle has become accepted throughout Australia. As of 2019, abortion on demand was legal (up to certain limits) in all Australian states and territories except for South Australia. It is estimated that a quarter to a third of Australian women will have an abortion in their lifetime, and the right to an abortion has strong popular support.

According to a 2017 study, abortions in Australia have an average cost of $560 after receiving the Medicare rebate, with some women also incurring extra costs from travel, accommodation, GP referrals, lost wages, childcare and medical tests. 34% of women surveyed reported they found payment for abortions difficult or very difficult. The maternal mortality rate in Australia is 5.5 deaths/100,000 live births as of 2015.

Australia, as of 2014, had a total fertility rate (TFR) of 1.8 babies born/woman, reflecting a sub-replacement fertility rate; the replacement rate is 2.1 children born/woman. This TFR has a recorded low of 1.74 in 2001, and a record high of 3.55 in 1961. The TFA has been below the replacement level since 1976.

== Women in politics ==
Despite being given the right to stand for federal election in 1902, women were not present for the first 20 years of Australian politics until the 1921 election of Edith Cowan to the West Australian Legislative Assembly, and were not represented federally until the 1943 federal election when Dorothy Tangney and Enid Lyons were elected to the Senate and the House of Representatives, respectively. Lyons would go on to become the first woman to hold a Cabinet position in Robert Menzies' 1949 ministry. Women would not go on to lead a state or territory until Rosemary Follett was elected Chief Minister of the Australian Capital Territory in 1989. Australia's first female Prime Minister, Julia Gillard was appointed in 2010.

Since the 1970s, women have received increasing representation in the parliament. Despite examples such as in 2010 females holding every position above them in Sydney, (Clover Moore as Lord Mayor, Kristina Keneally as Premier of New South Wales, Marie Bashir as Governor of New South Wales, Julia Gillard as Prime Minister, Quentin Bryce as Governor-General of Australia and Elizabeth II as Queen of Australia) they still remain a minority in federal parliament, and as of 2021 number 37.9% (31.1% in the House of Representatives and 51.3% in the Senate), an increase of 5.9% from the previous election.

Dame Roma Mitchell was made the first female Justice of the Supreme Court of South Australia in 1965, at the recommendation of Don Dunstan, South Australia's 38th Attorney-General. She was still the only female judge in South Australia when she retired 18 years later in 1983 although Justices Elizabeth Evatt and Mary Gaudron had been appointed to federal courts by the Whitlam Government. It was not until 1993 that the second woman was appointed to the court, Mitchell's former student, Margaret Nyland.

== Gender equality ==
Towards the end of the 19th century, married women first acquired the rights to hold property of their own, sue and be sued, enter into contracts, be subject to bankruptcy laws, be liable for the debts contracted before their marriage, and for the maintenance of their children. They acquired the same rights as held by unmarried women. Victoria passed the Married Women’s Property Act in 1884, New South Wales in 1879, and the remaining states between 1890 and 1897.

A marriage bar had applied to employment of women in a large number of industries. The Commonwealth Public Service Act 1902 provided that every female officer was "deemed to have retired from the Commonwealth service upon her marriage". The very great majority of women were effectively blocked from non-secretarial positions in the Commonwealth Public Service. In 1949 women were allowed into the clerical division of the service. In November 1966, Australia was the last democratic country to lift the legislated marriage bar which had prevented married women from holding permanent positions in the public service.

The immunity for marital rape, whereby a spouse (typically the husband) could insist on sexual intercourse with the other spouse without their consent, was removed in all states and territories, either by statute or judicial decision, between late 1970s and early 1990s. The first Australian state to deal with marital rape was South Australia, under the progressive initiatives of Premier Don Dunstan, which in 1976 partially removed the exemption. Section 73 of the Criminal Law Consolidation Act Amendment Act 1976 (SA) read: "No person shall, by reason only of the fact that he is married to some other person, be presumed to have consented to sexual intercourse with that other person".

Since 1983, a married woman has been able to apply for an Australian passport without needing an authorisation from her husband.

Since 1984, the federal Sex Discrimination Act 1984 has prohibited discrimination throughout Australia on the basis of mainly sexism, homophobia, transphobia and biphobia, as well as sex, marital or relationship status, actual or potential pregnancy, sexual orientation, gender identity, intersex status or breastfeeding in a range of areas of public life, including work, accommodation, education, the provision of goods, facilities and services, the activities of clubs and the administration of Commonwealth laws and programs.

In 1991, the marriage age in Australia of females was increased from 16 to 18, the age that had applied to males.

At November 2020, Australia's national gender pay gap was 13.4%, with women's average weekly ordinary full-time earnings across all industries and occupations being $1,562.00 compared to $1,804.20 for men.

== See also ==
- Convict women in Australia
- List of Australian women artists
- List of Australian women writers
- List of Australian sportswomen
- Peace movements in Australia
- Women and government in Australia
- Women in the Australian military
- Women in Christmas Island
- Women in the Cocos (Keeling) Islands
- Anti-discrimination laws in Australia
