= Australian Boat Race =

Event information
- Competitors: Melbourne University Boat Club (MUBC), Sydney University Boat Club (SUBC)
- First race: 2009
- Website: www.australianboatrace.com

Results
- Winner (2026): Men's: SUBC; Women's: SUBC
- Most wins: Men's: SUBC (14); Women's: MUBC (8), SUBC (8)

The Australian Boat Race is an annual rowing race between the University of Melbourne and the University of Sydney. The event hosts men's and women's races in eights, with the venue alternating each year between the two cities, typically on the Yarra River in Melbourne and Sydney Harbour.

== History ==
Melbourne and Sydney University are Australia's oldest universities, and their rowing clubs - the Melbourne University Boat Club (MUBC) and Sydney University Boat Club (SUBC) - were founded in 1859 and 1860 respectively. An informal race was held between the two clubs in 1860 on the Yarra River in Melbourne. With the addition of the University of Adelaide in the late 19th century and further universities throughout the 20th century, the annual "intervarsity" rowing competition between Australian universities continues to the present day.

In 2009, the first Australian Boat Race, contested between the University of Melbourne and University of Sydney, was held as a time trial as part of the Head of the Yarra regatta in Melbourne. Following this event, the Vice-Chancellors of the two universities agreed to an annual "match race" between men's eights and women's eights.

== The race ==
The men compete for The Edmund Barton Trophy, named in honour of Edmund Barton, who was Australia's first Prime Minister, and who represented the University of Sydney in the first official intervarsity race between Melbourne, Sydney and Adelaide universities in 1870.

The women compete for The Bella Guerin Trophy, named in honour of Bella Guerin, who was the first woman graduate of the University of Melbourne, and who was active in women's causes and fought for the inclusion of women in political life.

Each of the women's and men's events are raced as eights in a side-by-side format, with the boats starting at the same time from a stationary position, and the winner being the boat that crosses the finish line first. The location of the race alternates each year, with the event typically being held on the Yarra River in Melbourne and Sydney Harbour.

== Results ==
=== Winners ===
Year	Host	Men's	Women's	Comments
2009	Melbourne	Melbourne (1)	Melbourne (1)	Raced as part of the Head of the Yarra regatta
2010	Sydney	Sydney (1)	Melbourne (2)	
2011	Melbourne	Sydney (2)	Melbourne (3)	
2012	Sydney	Sydney (3)	Melbourne (4)	
2013	Melbourne	Melbourne (2)	Melbourne (5)	
2014	Sydney	Sydney (4)	Melbourne (6)	
2015	Melbourne	Sydney (5)	Melbourne (7)	
2016	Sydney	Sydney (6)	Melbourne (8)	
2017	Melbourne	Sydney (7)	Sydney (1)	
2018	Sydney	Sydney (8)	Sydney (2)	
2019	Melbourne	Sydney (9)	Sydney (3)	
2020		-	-	Cancelled due to COVID-19 pandemic
2021		-	-	Cancelled due to COVID-19 pandemic
2022	Sydney	Sydney (10)	Sydney (4)	
2023	Melbourne	Sydney (11)	Sydney (5)	
2024	Sydney	Sydney (12)	Sydney (6)	
2025	Melbourne	Sydney (13)	Sydney (7)	
2026	Sydney	Sydney (14)	Sydney (8)	

=== Summary of Wins ===
	Men's	Women's
University of Melbourne	2	8
University of Sydney	14	8

Note, summary as at end of 2026 event.

=== Cumulative Wins ===
Australian Boat Race Men's Cumulative Wins

Australian Boat Race Women's Cumulative Wins
