= Bella Guerin =

Australian activist

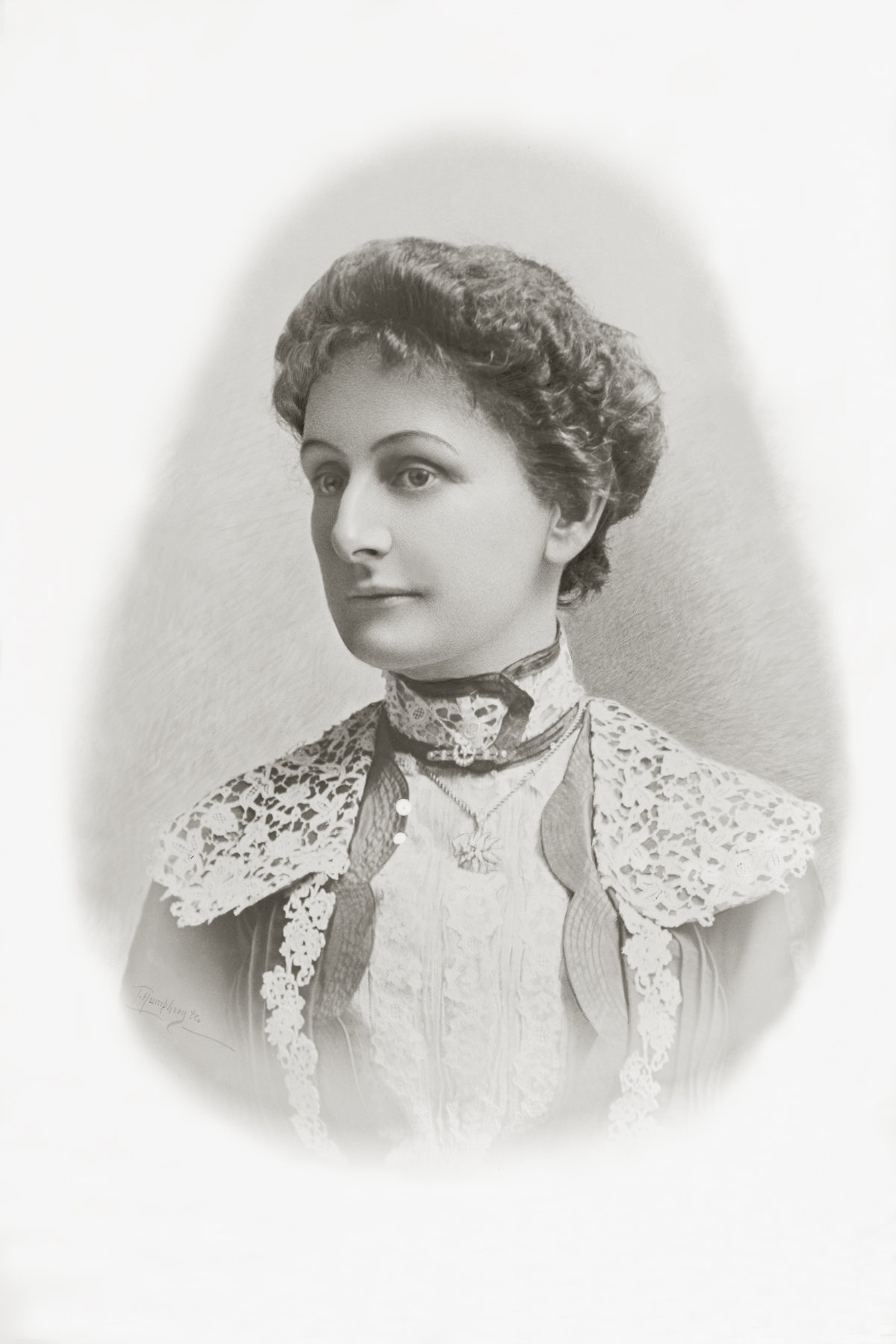
- Bella Guerin, c.1910
- Born: Julia Margaret Guerin; 23 April 1858; Williamstown, Victoria
- Died: 26 July 1923 (aged 65); Norwood, South Australia
- Education: University of Melbourne
- Occupations: Educator, Suffragist
- Spouses: Henry Halloran (m. 1891; died 1893) George D'Arcie Lavender (m. 1909, separated)

Julia Margaret Guerin Halloran Lavender (23 April 1858 — 26 July 1923), known popularly as Bella Guerin, was an Australian feminist, women's rights activist, women's suffragist, anti-conscriptionist, political activist, and schoolteacher.

In December 1883, she was the first woman to graduate from an Australian University, when she graduated B.A. at the University of Melbourne.

== Family ==
Julia Margaret Guerin, known as "Bella" was born at Williamstown, Victoria on 23 April 1858. She was the daughter of Julia Marguerite Guerin (1835–1890), née Kearney, (Note: Some sources (e.g., JK.2) have inadvertently followed the error made during the digitization of the hand-written Victorian Births Deaths and Marriages record of Bella's birth (6138/1858), which mis-read a poorly written capital "K" in the original document as "Th": thus "Thearney". The original (March 1854) entry in the Irish Parish Register of her Marriage to Patrick Guerin (image at ancestry.com.au) clearly shows that her family name was Kearney.) and Patrick Guerin (1835–1893), sometimes "Guérin"; both of whom were Irish Catholic immigrants. Her father worked in the penal system, serving as Governor of Ballarat Gaol (1881–1891). She had an older brother, Marco Guerin (1855–1929), who was born on her family's way to Australia in the Marco Polo (thus, "Marco"). (Note: Note that in its brief (31 August 1923) obituary, an Adelaide newspaper (AN.1) mistakenly asserted that "Mrs. Guerin-Lavender was a daughter of the late Dr. Ray, of Collins street [viz., Dr. Robert Ray (1828–1883)], and a sister of the present Dr. Ray, who practises in Melbourne [viz., Dr. William Robert Ray (1859–1937)]. Mrs. A. Scott Broad, of Hyde Park, is a sister [viz., Emmeline Fanny Ray (1861–1933), the wife of Alfred Scott Broad (1854–1929)]." (Another Adelaide newspaper (AA.1) supplied the same erroneous details in its brief obituary.))

She married the former civil servant and poet Henry Halloran (1811–1893), C.M.G. at St. Patrick's Cathedral, Melbourne, on 29 June 1891. Guerin was 33; Halloran was 80. In 1884, Halloran had addressed a "laudatory poem" to Bella, after seeing her graduation portrait. Halloran died in Sydney on 19 May 1893, leaving Bella with their son, Henry Marco James Halloran (1892–1981), just 5 months old.

She married her second husband, George D'Arcie Lavender (1887–1961), thirty years her junior, at Christ Church, St Kilda, Melbourne on 1 October 1909. The marriage was apparently short lived; and, at the time of his enlistment in the First AIF, at Adelaide on 14 April 1916, Lavender officially declared that he was not married, and that his next of kin was his sister, Mrs. Clara Rowson, of Bendigo.

== Education ==
"Educated by her mother, who had had the advantage of many years' schooling in France and Belgium, Mrs. Lavender was a brilliant scholarly woman, and spoke French as fluently and wittily as her mother tongue, and she was very proud of her University Degree, won in the "dark ages", when brainy woman were regarded as undesirable blue stockings, and their presence at the University was frowned upon. She was a writer, and her efforts in the press and on the platform helped in a great measure to secure the suffrage for women."
Table Talk, 2 August 1923.

In October 1878, from her own study at home, Bella passed in both the Melbourne University's Matriculation Examination and its Civil Service Examination.

=== University ===
Enrolling in 1881, (Note: In 1880, Melbourne University declared that women were to be admitted to study at the University on equal terms with male students, and in 1881, declared that women could be awarded degrees (KD.1).) Bella went on to become the first woman ever to graduate from an Australian university, (Note: On 19 March 1881 (PC.1), Mary Gaunt (aged 20), Bella Guerin (23), Lydia Harris (24), and Henrietta Hearn (29), the daughter of Professor Hearn, were the first women to enrol in the Arts Faculty of the University of Melbourne. Mary Gaunt withdrew from the degree in the first year, and Henrietta Hearn, having passed First Year Arts, did not continue her studies. Miss Lydia Amelia Harris (1857–1944), later, Mrs. Charles Henry Barbour, was the second Melbourne female B.A., graduating just four months after Guerin, in April 1884 (Melbourne University, The Ballarat Star, (Monday 21 April 1884), p. 3). Regardless of whenever her successful completion of her academic studies might have occurred, according to established world-wide tradition, Harris could not legally claim M.A. status until she had officially graduated in virtue of having the award of the degree conferred upon her at one of the university's formal graduation ceremonies.) (Note: The University of Adelaide was the first Australian university to admit women as graduating students (in 1876), the University of Melbourne was the second (in 1881), the University of Sydney was the third (in 1882), and the University of Tasmania was the fourth (on its inception in 1890) (JK.1). Bella Guerin, who graduated B.A. from the University of Melbourne in December 1883, was the first woman to graduate from any Australian University; and, in December 1885, she was the first woman to graduate M.A. from any Australian University. In May 1885, Isola Florence Thompson, (B.A.) and Mary Elizabeth Brown, (B.A.), who had both enrolled in 1882, were the first women to graduate from Sydney University (IN.1); and, in May 1887 (DT.1), Thompson was the first woman to graduate M.A. from Sydney University. In December 1885, Edith Emily Dornwell, B.Sc. was the first woman to graduate from Adelaide University (PA.1). Eliza Helen Wilson (1869–1933), who graduated B.A. from the University of Tasmania in December 1896, was the first woman to graduate from the university of Tasmania (HM.1). She went on to graduate M.A. in April 1903 (TN.1). Maude Ethel Leggett (1876–1911) (B.A., Tasmania, 1897) was the first woman to graduate M.A. from the University of Tasmania, in November 1899 (HM.2).) graduating Bachelor of Arts (B.A.), aged 25, (Note: Note that a number of contemporary accounts (The Ballarat Courier, 8 December 1883, The Illustrated Australian News, 24 December 1883, etc.) report that Bella was only 19 at the time of her graduation, mistakenly asserting that she had been born, at Williamstown, on 29 March 1864.) from the University of Melbourne on 1 December 1883. It was reported that, "after receiving her degree Miss Guerin was enthusiastically cheered by those present". (Note: "The first degree yet conferred upon a lady [by the University of Melbourne] was so conferred on Saturday, and her name is Bella Guerin, and the occasion served for a great deal of exuberant demonstration by the undergraduates. No doubt the young lady was gratified at the compliment paid her, but it is questionable if the sex generally are not justified in regarding the applause as but left-handed kind of praise, as if it were a wonderful thing for a woman to possess an understanding at all." (SH.1)) Later, she became the first woman to attain a Master of Arts (M.A.) from Melbourne University when she graduated on 5 December 1885; and on 23 April 1892, "Mrs. Bella Halloran (née Guerin)" of Melbourne, was admitted to the courtesy degree of M.A. ad eundem gradum at the University of Sydney.

== Career ==
=== Teaching ===
Her first teaching position was at Loreto College, Ballarat, where she called for higher-education scholarships for Catholic girls, in order to assist "in the furtherance of a movement, which will place at the disposal of the social reformer, a band of noble, thoughtful women as a powerful influence for good, in the persons of our Catholic girl-graduates." She taught Matriculation classes and University subjects at the Ballarat School of Mines over five years, (Note: In 1890, The Ballarat Courier (News Item, 29 April 1890) reported that two Ballarat students (News Item, 10 December 1887) — both of whom had been "exclusively trained ... by Miss Bella Guerin ... at the School of Mines university courses" — had graduated Bachelor of Arts (B.A.) at Melbourne University: Miss Johanna Elizabeth Kennedy (1871–1956) (graduated 30 March 1889), and Mr Charles William Wilson (1870–1949) (graduated 26 April 1890), (News Item, 8 December 1888), (News Item, 23 January 1890). Johanna Elizabeth Kennedy, later Mrs John Daniel Smyth, passed both the Matriculation and Civil Service examinations in 1884 (News Item, 26 June 1884), at the age of 12, having been a student of Bella Guerin at Loreto Convent (News Item, 12 July 1884). Having gained a Licentiate in Theology (L.Th.) in 1906, Wilson went on to become Canon Charles William Wilson, Rector of St James Church of England, in New Town, Tasmania (Obituary, 30 April 1949).) from 1887 — i.e., upon the School of Mines' official affiliation with the University of Melbourne in 1887 — until her marriage in 1891. (Note: "Since the formation ... [of] the University classes ... at the School of Mines ... in 1886 by Miss Bella Guerin. M.A., 186 students have been enrolled. Of these two have been enabled to complete the full course of the B.A. degree, three have passed the first or first and second years from the classes proceeding to the University to finish their course, over 20 have passed matriculation, nine public service, 11 to the preliminary pharmacy, and at the Education Department, and minor examinations, the classes have been correspondingly successful. The University classes have thus had so far a wonderfully successful career, especially when it is remembered that they have been in existence for little more than five years." (The Ballarat Star, 28 January 1893).)

After her husband's death in 1893, Bella returning to teaching from financial necessity, She taught in Sydney, then Carlton, Prahran, and East Melbourne. From 1898 to 1903, in Bendigo, she operated University College, Bendigo. From 1904 to 1917 she taught at Camperdown, and in a succession of small Melbourne schools at South Yarra, St Kilda, Parkville, and Brunswick, with diminishing success. According to Farley Kelly, "her increasing political activity and disputes over conditions with the Education Department probably contributed to this outcome".

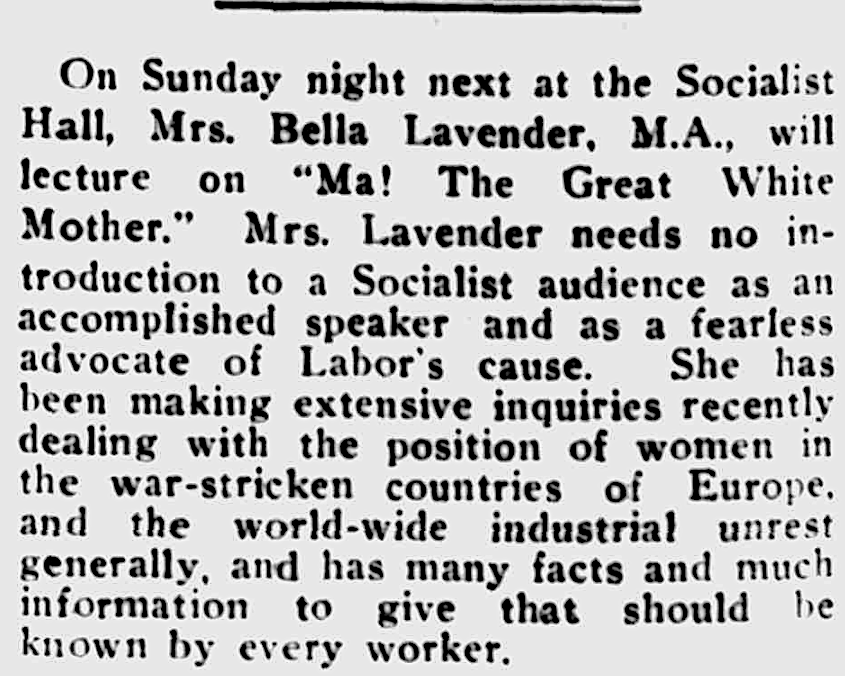
Labor Call, 15 September 1921.

=== Women's Political Association ===
From the mid-1890s, whilst running University College, Bendigo, she became involved with suffragist issues, and became an office-bearer in the Bendigo Women's Franchise League. As vice-president of the Women's Political Association (1912-1914) Guerin co-authored Vida Goldstein's 1913 Senate election pamphlet. However, according to Farley Kelly, "[her] dual membership of non-party feminist and Labor Party organizations proved untenable".

In 1914 she began to write, and speak for the Labor Party, the Victorian Socialist Party, and the Women's Socialist League, and was recognized as a "witty, cogent and instructive" commentator on a range of controversial social issues, which included "the rights of illegitimate children", "brotherhood and sisterhood without sex distinction", and the "defence of English militant suffragettes".

=== Anti-war ===
Mrs. Bella Lavender, M.A. is not well-fitted physically for an out-door speaker. Her figure, tall and slight, would seem more at home in the schoolroom, but the big soul of her rises beyond the physical limitations of nature, defying despotism, defying anything that could come between her and her mission. Who, looking at this courageous woman, could doubt her when she said: "I am of the people; I love the people; and I would gladly suffer martyrdom to-morrow if such a sacrifice would benefit in any way my brothers and sisters — the workers of the world."
The Australian Worker, 14 September 1916.

An ardent anti-war propagandist, and as president of the Labor Women's Anti-Conscription Committee, she led its campaign during the lead up to the 28 October 1916 Australian Conscription Referendum, speaking in Adelaide, Broken Hill, Victorian metropolitan centres, and Victorian country centres, "against militarism" and "in defence of rights of assembly and free speech".

=== Politics ===
Appointed vice-president of the Australian Labor Party's Women's Central Organizing Committee (W.C.O.C.) in March 1918, she aroused criticism for describing Labor women as "performing poodles and packhorses", "under-represented in policy decisions", and "relegated to auxiliary fund raising roles". From that time, and as a socialist feminist Bella only worked for Labor "so far as it stands for those principles represented by the Red Flag", "believing in the parliamentary system but desiring capitalism's elimination".

=== A "democratic grub" ===
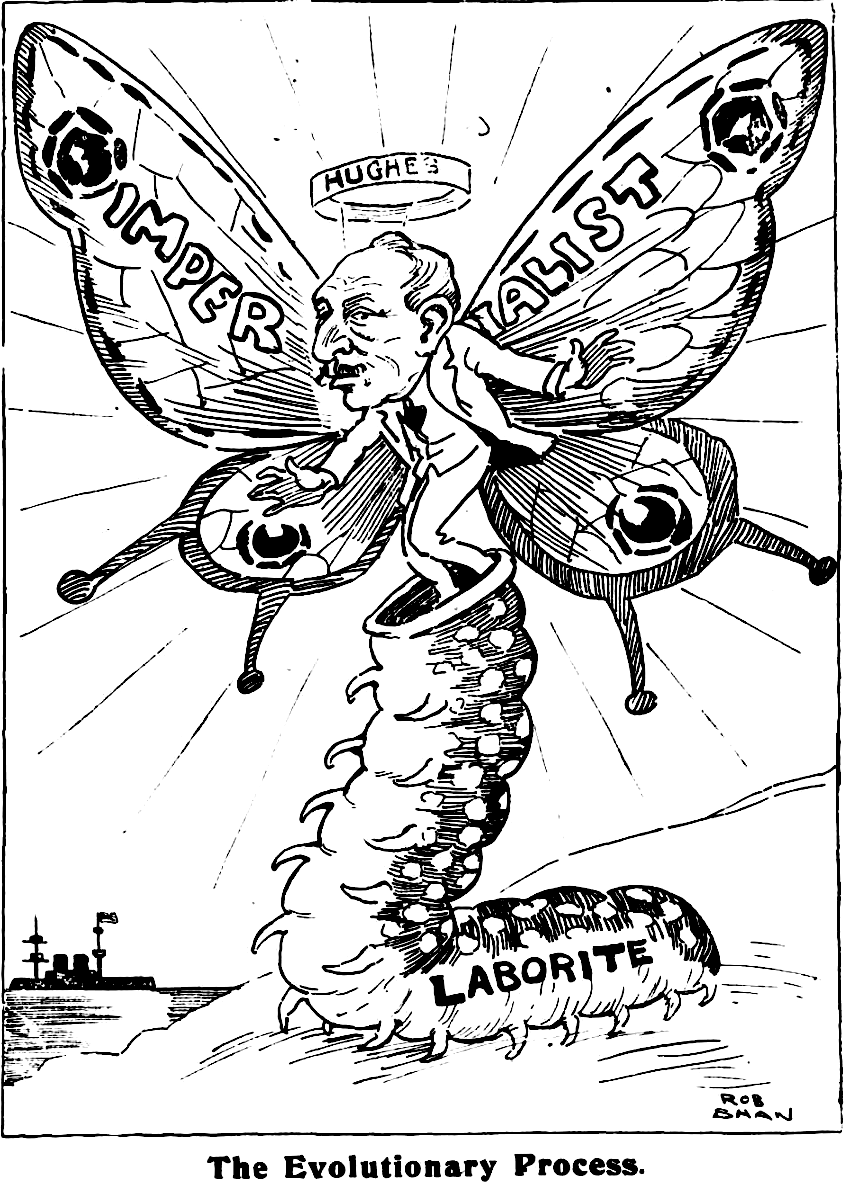
Labor Call, 17 February 1916.

During her famous speech to a public meeting of the Melbourne branch of the No-Conscription Fellowship, held in the Guild Hall, in Swanston Street on 29 June 1916, Bella alluded to Rob Shaw's recent political cartoon in The Labor Call (RS.1) which depicted Billy Hughes, the current Prime Minister of Australia, as a magnificent "Imperialist" butterfly emerging from a drab "Laborite" caterpillar body and, to great applause, remarked that her own political evolution "was exactly the reverse to that of Comrade Hughes", in that, in her case, she "began as an Imperialistic butterfly and ended up as a democratic grub".

== Religion ==
In religion she moved away from her early Roman Catholicism, and moved to rationalism.

== Personal life ==
"She saw herself as a 'national idealist' and an 'incorrigible militant', promoting women's participation in public life". She was regarded as an orator of "unique talents".

Guerin's son, Marco (M.B. B.S.), who conducted a general practice in Adelaide from 1915, described her as "the kindest and most gentle of women".

== Death ==
She died of cirrhosis of the liver, aged 65, at her son's residence in Norwood, South Australia on 26 July 1923, and was buried in the Catholic section of the West Terrace Cemetery on 28 July 1923.

== Legacy ==
- The University of Ballarat (now known as Federation University Australia), honouring Guerin's 5 years' teaching at the School of Mines, named one of the two Mt Helen campus' Halls of Residence after her (the other was named after Peter Lalor, of Eureka Stockade fame).
- Guerin Place in the Canberra suburb of Chisholm is named in her honour.
- She was posthumously inducted onto the Victorian Honour Roll of Women in 2001.
- Since 2009, the Melbourne University Boat Club, founded in 1859, and the Sydney University Boat Club, founded in 1860, have competed against each other in an annual rowing race: the Australian Boat Race. The women compete for the Bella Guerin Trophy, named in honour of Bella Guerin, B.A. and M.A. (Melbourne), and the men compete for the Edmund Barton Trophy, named in honour of Edmund Barton, the first Australian Prime minister, and B.A. (1868) and M.A. (1870) from Sydney.

== Works ==
Her publications on a wide range of subjects included the following items:

- 1883: 'Bella Guerin, Ballarat', "In Memoriam of The Prince Imperial of France: Killed in South Africa 1st June, 1879" (Poem), The Ballarat Star, (Saturday, 18 March 1911), p. 5. (re: Louis-Napoléon, Prince Imperial)
- 1886: 'Bella Guerin, M.A.', "Lectures by an Uncertain Professor: Lecture First—Botany: Red and White Carrots", Loreto Eucalyptus Blossoms, Mary's Mount, Ballarat, (21 June 1886), pp. 16-17.
- 1886: 'Bella Guerin, M.A.', "Higher Education of Women", Loreto Eucalyptus Blossoms, Mary's Mount, Ballarat, (10 December 1886), pp. 6–8.
- 1886: 'Bella Guerin, M.A.', "The Development of National Character in Victoria", The Argus, (Saturday, 10 July 1886), p. 4.
- 1887: 'Bella Guerin, M.A.', "Modern Woman", The Sydney Quarterly Magazine, Vol.4, No.4, (December 1887), pp. 324-328.
- 1888: 'Bella Guerin, M.A.', "The Burial of Pompeius" (Poem), The Sydney Quarterly Magazine, Vol.6, No.1, (March 1888), pp. 34-36.
- 1890: 'Bella Guerin, M.A.', "Modern Education", The Sydney Quarterly Magazine, Vol.7, No.1, (March 1890), pp. 17-23.
- 1890: 'Bella Guerin, M.A.', "In Memoriam of Mrs. Henrietta Elizabeth Halloran, Beloved Wife of Henry Halloran, esq., C.M.G., Mowbray, Ashfield, New South Wales. Died March 15th, 1889" (Poem), The Sydney Quarterly Magazine, Vol.7, No.2, (June 1890), pp. 119-120. (re: first wife of Henry Halloran)
- 1892: "'Fragmentary Thoughts' by Sir Henry Parkes", The Sydney Quarterly Magazine, Vol.9, No.1, (March 1892), pp. 33–40.
- 1894: 'Bella Halloran, M.A.', "In Memoriam of Henry Halloran, C.M.G., died May 19, 1893" (Poem), The Sydney Mail and New South Wales Advertiser, (Saturday, 19 May 1894), p. 1021. (re: Henry Halloran, Guerin's first husband)
- 1895: 'Bella Halloran, M.A., First Lady Graduate Melb. Univ.', "A Woman's View on Woman's Suffrage" (Letter to the Editor), The Argus, (Friday, 15 March 1895), p. 6.
- 1895: 'Mrs. Halloran, M.A.', "The New Woman: Should She Be Repressed", The Weekly Times, (Saturday, 14 September 1895), p. 11.
- 1895: 'Bella Halloran, M.A.', "The New Woman" (Letter to the Editor), The Weekly Times, (Saturday, 14 September 1895), p. 16.
- 1895: 'Bella Halloran, M.A.', "The New Woman" (Letter to the Editor), The Weekly Times, (Saturday, 28 September 1895), p. 16.
- 1895: 'Bella Halloran, M.A.', "Woman in the Twentieth Century: Hopes and Expectations", The Weekly Times, (Saturday, 26 October 1895), p. 9.
- 1895: 'Bella Halloran, M.A.', "Prayers for Rain: A Rebuke" (Letter to the Editor), The (Melbourne) Herald, (12 November 1895), p. 3.
- 1895: 'Bella Halloran, M.A.', "The Richmond Tragedy" (Letter to the Editor), The (Melbourne) Herald, (Wednesday, 20 November 1895), p. 3. (re: "The Richmond Tragedy" and "Interview with Mrs Wright")
- 1895: "The Franchise Question" (Letter to the Editor), The (Melbourne) Herald, (Monday, 2 December 1895), p. 3.
- 1895: 'Bella Halloran, M.A.', "Womanly Women", The (Melbourne) Herald, (Friday, 6 December 1895), p. 4.
- 1896: 'Bella Halloran, M.A.', "Rational Dress", The Weekly Times, (Saturday, 22 February 1896), p. 12.
- 1896: 'Bella Halloran, M.A.', "Women in Politics" (Letter to the Editor), The (Melbourne) Herald, (Friday, 12 June 1896), p. 2. (re: "Women in Politics")
- 1896: 'Bella Halloran, M.A.', "Women's Suffrage", (Letter to the Editor), The Weekly Times, (Saturday, 4 July 1896), p. 21.
- 1896: 'Bella Guerin-Halloran, M.A.', "The Lady Doctors", (Letter to the Editor), The (Melbourne) Herald, (Monday, 27 April 1896), p. 34.
- 1896: 'Bella Guerin Halloran, M.A.', "Ladies as Resident Hospital Doctors" (Letter to the Editor), The Age, (Wednesday, 29 April 1896), p. 7.
- 1896: 'Bella Halloran, M.A.', "Poets and Critics", The (Melbourne) Herald, (Tuesday, 22 September 1896), p. 4.
- 1897: 'Bella Halloran, M.A.', "Women's Suffrage", (Letter to the Editor), The (Melbourne) Herald, (Monday, 8 February 1897), p. 3.
- 1897: 'Bella Halloran, M.A.', "In Memoriam: To the Memory of the Late Sir Anthony Colling Brownless, K.C.M.G." (Poem), The (Melbourne) Herald, (Friday, 17 December 1897), p. 6. (re: Anthony Brownless)
- 1899: 'Bella Halloran, M.A., "The Dog is the Friend of Man" (Letter to the Editor", The Bendigo Independent, (Wednesday, 1 March 1899), p. 3.
- 1899: 'Bella Halloran, M.A., "Small Selections" (Letter to the Editor", The Bendigo Advertiser, (Saturday, 6 May 1899), p. 5. (re: "The Cheviot Estate")
- 1899: 'Bella Halloran, M.A.', "In Memoriam Sir Frederick M'Coy" (Poem), The Bendigo Advertiser, (Saturday, 20 May 1899), p. 3. (re: Frederick McCoy)
- 1899: 'Bella Halloran, M.A.', "Women's Suffrage" (Letter to the Editor), The Argus, (Thursday, 17 August 1899), p. 6. (re: "Enfranchisement" and "Lady Lecturer")
- 1899: 'Bella Halloran, M.A.', "Education v. Nature in the Formation of Character", The Bendigo Advertiser, (Saturday, 26 August 1899), p. 2.
- 1899: 'Bella Halloran, M.A., Bendigo, Victoria', "Bear our Australian Banner to the Front (Dedicated to the Australian Contingent for the Transvaal)" (Poem), The Queenslander, (Saturday, 11 November 1899), p. 949.
- 1899: 'Bella Halloran, M.A.', "The Heroines of Shakespeare", The Weekly Times, (Saturday, 25 December 1899), p. 31.
- 1900: 'Bella Halloran, M.A., University College, Bendigo', "Women's Anti-Suffrage Movement" (Letter to the Editor), The Bendigo Advertiser, (Thursday, 26 July 1900), p. 3.
- 1900: 'Bella Halloran, M.A., University College, Bendigo', "Franchise for Women" (Letter to the Editor), The Bendigo Advertiser, (Wednesday, 8 August 1900), p. 5.
- 1900: 'Bella Halloran, M.A., Member of the Committee, Bendigo Women's Franchise League', "Woman Suffrage" (Letter to the Editor), The Age, (Friday, 10 August 1900), p. 7.
- 1900: 'Bella Halloran, M.A.', "Why should Women be Helpless", The Bendigo Advertiser, (Friday, 17 August 1900), p. 3. (re: The Breelong murders)
- 1900: 'Bella Halloran, M.A., Bendigo', "Archbishop Carr and the Scripture Lessons" (Letter to the Editor), The Argus, (Wednesday, 22 August 1900), p. 7.
- 1900: 'Bella Halloran, M.A., Bendigo Women's Franchise League', "The New Crusade" (Letter to the Editor), The Age, (Thursday, 23 August 1900), p. 6. (re: Woman's Suffrage)
- 1901: 'Bella Halloran, M.A.', "Our Streets" (Letter to the Editor), The Bendigo Advertiser, (Friday, 8 March 1901), p. 3.
- 1901: 'Bella Halloran, M.A., University College, Bendigo', "Woman's Franchise Bill", The Bendigo Independent, (Friday, 23 September 1901), p. 8.
- 1901: 'Bella Halloran, M.A.', "Lake Burrumbeet: In Memoriam, 12th September, 1890" (Poem), The Bendigo Advertiser, (Monday, 7 October 1901), p. 4. (re: Lake Burrumbeet)
- 1902: 'Bella Halloran, M.A.', "Adult Franchise", The Bendigo Advertiser, (Wednesday, 14 May 1902), p. 5.
- 1902: 'Bella Halloran, M.A.', "The Coronation Oath" (Letter to the Editor), The Bendigo Advertiser, (Wednesday, 5 July 1902), p. 3.
- 1902: 'Bella Halloran, M.A.', "Adult Franchise", The Weekly Times, (Saturday, 5 July 1902), p. 33.
- 1903: 'Bella Guerin-Halloran, M.A. (Melb. Univ.)',"Compulsory Lectures" (Letter to the Editor), The Argus, (Thursday, 8 October 1903), p. 9.
- 1904: 'Bella Halloran, M.A., South Yarra',"The Australia's Cat" (Letter to the Editor), The Argus, (Saturday, 25 June 1904), p. 16. (see: "Wreck of R.M.S. Australia" and "Pussy and the Girl Graduate")
- 1905: 'Bella Halloran, M.A.', "In Memoriam of the Rev. I.M. Goldreich, Rabbi of Ballarat: Died 27th June, 1905", The Jewish Herald (Friday, 14 July 1905), p. 9. (re: Israel Morris Goldreich (1834–1905))
- 1905: 'Bella Halloran, M.A., Carlton', "Christmas Poultry" (Letter to the Editor), The Age, (Tuesday, 19 December 1905), p. 6.
- 1910: 'Bella Lavender, M.A., Melbourne University', "Democracy", The Labor Call, (Thursday, 22 December 1910), p. 5.
- 1911: 'Bella Guerin-Lavender, M.A.', "In Memoriam of James Oddie: Died at Ballarat, March, 1911" (Poem), The Ballarat Star, (Saturday, 18 March 1911), p. 1. (re: James Oddie)
- 1912: 'Bella Lavender, M.A., Vice-President Women's Political Association', "Women in the Twentieth-Century: Their Work", The Bendigo Independent, (Saturday, 13 July 1912), p. 3.
- 1913: 'Bella Lavender, M.A.', "Women's Sense of Honour", The Woman Voter, (Monday, 10 February 1913), p. 1.
- 1913: 'Bella Lavender, M.A.', "Our Australian Girls", The Woman Voter, (Monday, 10 February 1913), p. 2.
- 1913: 'Bella Lavender, M.A.', "W.P.A. March" (Poem), The Woman Voter, (Tuesday, 8 April 1913), p. 2. (re: Women's Political Association of Victoria)
- 1913: 'Bella Lavender, M.A.', "Mrs. Pankhurst" (Sonnet), Woman Voter, (Tuesday, 29 April 1913), p. 4. (re: Emmeline Pankhurst)
- 1913: 'Bella Lavender, M.A.', "Preference to Unionists", THe Woman Voter, (Tuesday, 24 June 1913), pp. 2, 3.
- 1913: 'Bella Lavender, M.A.', "Woman's Inhumanity To Woman", The Woman Voter, (Tuesday, 12 August 1913), p. 3.
- 1914: 'Bella Lavender, M.A.', "The Venus of Valasquez" (Poem), The Socialist, (Friday, 3 April 1914), p. 2. (re: the 10 March 1914 attack by the suffragette, Mary Richardson, on Diego Velázquez's painting, Venus at her Mirror in the National Gallery, London)
- 1914: 'Bella Lavender, M.A.', "Woman and Democracy", The Labor Call, (Thursday, 23 April 1914), p. 11.
- 1914: 'Bella Lavender, M.A.', "The Coming Federal Elections", The Woman Voter, (Tuesday, 21 July 1914), p. 1.
- 1914: 'Bella Lavender, M.A.', ""A Rolling Stone Gathers No Moss"" (Poem), The Labor Call, (Thursday, 23 April 1914), p. 7. (re: May Moss, TA.1, and William Watt)
- 1914: 'Bella Lavender, M.A.', "Breakers Ahead: Proposed Anti-Strike Legislation in our State Parliaments", The Labor Call, (Thursday, 6 July 1916), p. 8.
- 1918: 'Bella Lavender, M.A.', "Kamarade, Vot 'Nein'", The Labor Call, (Thursday, 24 January 1918), p. 9.
- 1918: 'Bella Lavender, M.A.', "Bravo! The Red Flag", The Socialist, (Friday, 6 September 1918), p. 3.
- 1918: 'Bella Lavender, M.A., Vice-President North Melbourne Branch, Australian Labor Party',"Woman's Legal Status: A Case for Labor Women's Alertness to the Needs of Women", The Socialist, (Friday, 1 November 1918), p. 4.
- 1922: 'Bella Lavender, M.A.', "Sex and Society", The Socialist, (Friday, 24 March 1922), p. 2.

== See also ==
- Henry Halloran, first husband
- Australian Boat Race
