= Shinners =

Shinners is a surname. Notable people with the surname include:

- Chris Shinners (born 1952), Australian rower
- John Shinners (1947-2022), American football player
- Kevin Shinners (born 1945), Australian rules footballer
- Lloyd Herbert Shinners (1918–1971), American botanist
- Paul Shinners (born 1959), British footballer
- Ralph Shinners (1895–1962), American baseball player
