= Henry Halloran =

Australian developer (1869–1953)

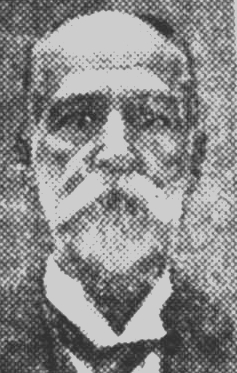
Henry Halloran c. 1924

Henry Ferdinand Halloran (9 August 1869 – 22 October 1953) was a surveyor, major property owner, and land developer in New South Wales, Australia.

== Family background ==
Halloran was born in Sydney. His father was a bank clerk and architect named Edward Roland Halloran and his mother was Adeline Burgess, née Reuss. His grandfather, also named Henry Halloran, was a poet and civil servant. His great-grandfather was Laurence Hynes Halloran, who arrived in Australia as a convict, transported to Sydney.

== Career ==
Halloran attended Sydney Boys High School and Newington College. He qualified as a surveyor in 1890 and became a conveyancer and valuer. After establishing Henry F. Halloran & Co. in 1897, Halloran became a significant figure in property development and urban planning in New South Wales, from the 1880s until the 1950s. His developments included Seaforth and Warriewood in Sydney in 1906, and the unsuccessful Environa, near Canberra, in 1930. There were other Halloran subdivisions at Stanwell Park, near Orient Point, and at Currarong.

He also built structures at Tanilba Bay in 1931. He attempted to create a development called Pacific City, near Jervis Bay. The site of Pacific City was to have been west of Hyams Beach and would have extended west to the St Georges Basin shoreline. He also initiated a development he called Port Stephens City, at present day North Arm Cove, but, despite a significant area of land outside the present-day village being subdivided and sold, only a small village eventuated.

Halloran began the revival of the ghost town of South Huskisson, on the western shore of Jervis Bay. He renamed the deserted "Old Township", Vincentia, in 1952. He did not live to see it reborn as a holiday destination, following land sales for holiday homes, also known as "weekenders", which occurred in the 1950s and 1960s.

Halloran died on 22 October 1953, at the age of 84.

== Legacy ==
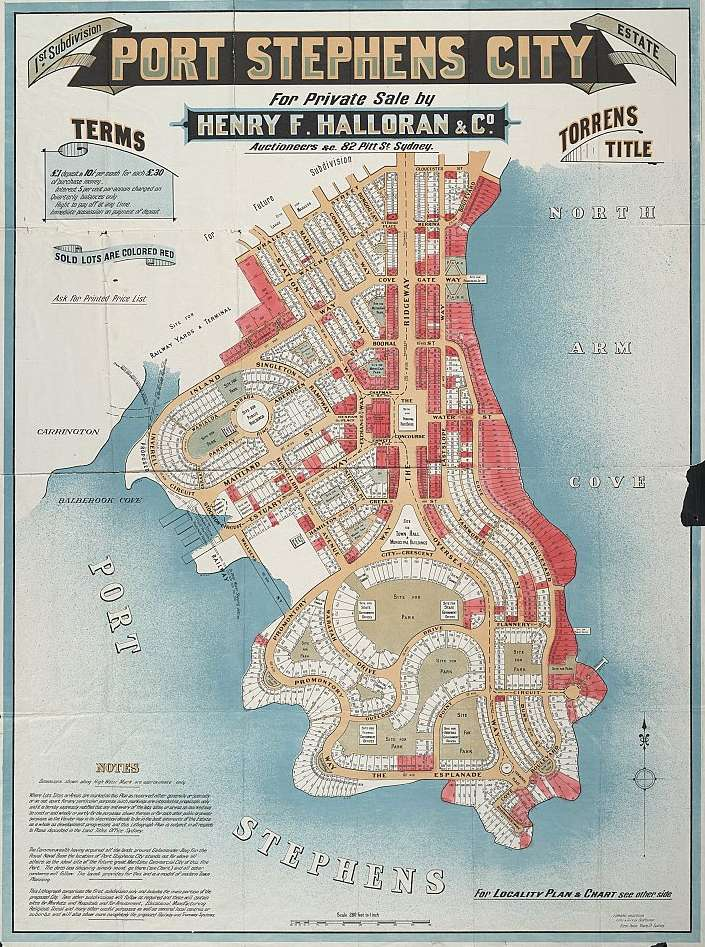
Advertisement for the Port Stephens City development

Several collections of Halloran's papers, including maps and survey notes detailing land and property subdivision throughout New South Wales, are held at the State Library of New South Wales.

Halloran's son, Warren Halloran, established the Halloran Trust, in 2012. Warren Halloran donated his own collection of artworks, artifacts and curios, which is now displayed – in what has been described as a 'gentleman's cabinet of curiosities' – in the Science and Sea Gallery of the Jervis Bay Maritime Museum, at Huskisson. The same museum is a beneficiary of the Halloran Trust, and it houses the Halloran Business Archive, the records of Henry F. Halloran & Co., for the period from 1898 to 1953. The other beneficiaries of the Trust are the University of Sydney, Scots College, and the community of Culburra.

The University of Sydney, established the Henry Halloran Trust, aimed at promoting scholarship, innovation and research in town planning, urban development and land management.

Part of Halloran's legacy are significant portions of undeveloped marginal land, now owned by his heirs or the Halloran Trust, that are proposed for development from time to time.

Another legacy is a subdivision at North Arm Cove, planned by Walter Burley Griffin in 1918, which Halloran sold after subdivision. Much of it is now a "paper subdivision", being currently zoned non-urban, with a prohibition on the erection of permanent dwellings. The 2020s saw an effort by a community of land owners to realise the original Griffin plan as a sustainable development, through the North Arm Cove Initiative.
