= Ian Luxford =

Australian rower (born 1952)

Personal information
- Nationality: Australian
- Born: 27 November 1952 (age 73)
- Education: Sydney High School

Sport
- Sport: Rowing
- Club: Sydney Uni Boat Club; Drummoyne Rowing Club

Achievements and titles
- Olympic finals: Montreal 1976 M8+
- National finals: King's Cup 1974, 75, 79.

Ian F. Luxford (born 27 November 1952) is an Australian former representative rower. He was a three time Australian champion who represented at world championships and competed in the men's coxless pair event at the 1976 Summer Olympics.

== Club and state rowing ==
Luxford was educated at Sydney Boys' High School where he took up rowing. He rowed in a Sydney High eight which contested the national schoolboy eight title at the Australian Rowing Championships in 1970. His senior club rowing was initially from the Sydney University Boat Club and later the Drummoyne Rowing Club.

He first made state selection for New South Wales in the men's eight which contested and won the 1974 King's Cup at the annual Interstate Regatta. In 1975 he was again seated at seven in the New South Wales King's Cup winning eight. Luxford and Chris Shinners took a Sydney University coxed pair to the 1975 Australian Rowing Championships to contest the coxed pair national title. They placed second. The following year Luxford and Shinners won the national coxless pair title at the Australian Championships.

Luxford took a break after the 1976 Olympics but returned to the elite level rowing in 1979. He was back in the New South Wales men's eight and seated at two for their 1979 King's Cup campaign at the Interstate Regatta. In a Drummoyne four coached by Rusty Robertson, he contested both the coxed and the coxless four titles at the 1979 Australian Rowing Championships and won the national championship title in the four without. Then in 1980 back in SUBC colours and paired again with Chris Shinners he contested the coxless pair title at the Australian Championships, placing second in both that boat and in an SUBC crew which raced for the coxless four title. In 1981 Luxford made his fourth and final appearance at Australian championships in a pair with Chris Shinners. They contested both the coxed and coxless pair national titles, placing second and third respectively. In 1982 Shinners and Luxford were in the middle of a SUBC coxless four which placed fourth in an attempt for that national title.

In 2004 and 2006 in University of Queensland colours Luxford contested the Champion of Champions single sculls event at the Australian Masters Championships.

== International representative rowing ==
Luxford made his Australian representative debut in the Australian eight for the 1974 World Rowing Championships. The 1974 victorious New South Wales King's Cup crew was chosen almost in toto for the World Championships in Lucerne. That crew finished in eighth place with Luxford in the seven seat. At the 1975 World Rowing Championships in Nottingham, Luxford was again seated at seven in the Australian men's eight. That crew placed second in its heat, won the repechage and finished in sixth place in the final.

For the 1976 Montreal Olympics Australia's coxless pair was the second priority boat picked by selectors after the eight. Luxford was selected with Chris Shinners to row the pair. They were eliminated in the repechage.

== Coaching ==
Post-competitive rowing Luxford took up coaching at the Hutchins School in Hobart. He took schoolboy fours to the Australian Rowing Championships in 1985 and 1986 and then their schoolboy eight in 1987. From 1986 he was the Hutchins master-in-charge of rowing.
