= Women in the Cocos (Keeling) Islands =

The women in Cocos (Keeling) Islands are the female residents of Cocos (Keeling) Islands, a dependency of Australia that can be found in the Indian Ocean. The first known settlers arrived on the islands in 1826.

== Pregnancy ==
In 1826, the female residents of Cocos Islands had an average birth rate of 8.4.

== Marriage ==
For the women in Cocos Islands, the legal marrying age is 16 years old. After formalizing the marriage, women in general can make decisions about where they will be residing, a choice that is not dependent on the male spouses. Legal policies regarding marriage in Cocos Islands, however, is regulated by the Commonwealth Marriage Act of 1961, and is governed by ordinances such as the Christian Marriage Ordinance, the Civil Marriage Ordinance, and the Muslim Ordinance, among others.

== Representation ==
Kaum Ibu (Women's Group) is a women's rights organisation that represents the view of women from the islands at a local and national level.

== See also ==
- Women in Australia
- Women in Malaysia
