= Chris Shinners =

Australian rower (born 1952)

Personal information
- Nationality: Australian
- Born: 8 June 1952 (age 74)

Sport
- Sport: Rowing
- Club: Sydney Uni Boat Club; Drummoyne Rowing Club

Achievements and titles
- Olympic finals: Montreal 1976 M2-
- National finals: King's Cup

Chris D. Shinners (born 8 June 1952) is an Australian rower. He was a six-time Australian champion who represented at world championships and competed in the men's coxless pair event at the 1976 Summer Olympics.

== Club and state rowing ==
Shinners' senior club rowing was from the Sydney University Boat Club. He rowed in the Sydney University men's eight at the Australian Intervarsity Championships in 1971, 1972 and 1973. At the 1978 Intervarsity Championships he won the universities single sculls title, racing for Sydney Uni and in 1979 he placed second in that same event.

Shinners first made state selection for New South Wales in the men's eight which contested the 1973 King's Cup at the annual Interstate Regatta. In 1974 and 1975 he stroked the New South Wales eight to King's Cup victories. He was back in the New South Wales men's eight and seated at bow for their 1977 King's Cup victory at the Interstate Regatta.

Shinners and Tim Conrad raced in a Sydney University coxed pair at the 1974 Australian Rowing Championships placing second in that boat and also placing second in a four which also contested the coxed four championship. In 1975 Shinners rowed with Ian Luxford in a Sydney University coxed pair at the Australian Rowing Championships contesting the coxed pair title and again finished second. The following year Shinners and Luxford won the national coxless pair title at the Australian Championships. 1977 saw Shinners rowing the national coxed pair championship with Mosman's Simon Dean and with Stuart Carter on the rudder. They placed second. In 1978 he raced and won the junior sculls title – at that time a classification for scullers who had not yet won a senior sculling race.

In 1979 and rowing with Sydney Rowing Club's Ted Hale, Shinner won the national coxless pair title at the Australian Championships. In 1980 still in SUBC colours and paired again with Luxford, Shinners contested the coxless pair title, placing second in both that boat and in an SUBC crew which raced for the coxless four title. In 1981 Shinners made his fourth appearance at Australian championships in a pair with Ian Luxford. They contested both the coxed and coxless pair national titles, placing second and third respectively. In 1982 Shinners and Luxford were in the middle of a SUBC coxless four which placed fourth in an attempt for that national title.

== International representative rowing ==
Shinners made his Australian representative debut in the Australian eight for the 1974 World Rowing Championships. The 1974 victorious New South Wales King's Cup crew was chosen almost in toto for the World Championships in Lucerne. That crew finished in eighth place with Shinners at stroke. At the 1975 World Rowing Championships in Nottingham, Shinners was again the stroke-man in the Australian men's eight. That crew placed second in its heat, won the repechage and finished in sixth place in the final.

For the 1976 Montreal Olympics Australia's coxless pair was the second priority boat picked by selectors after the eight. Shinners was selected with Ian Luxford to row the pair. They were eliminated in the repechage.
