= Melbourne University Boat Club =

Rowing club in Victoria, Australia

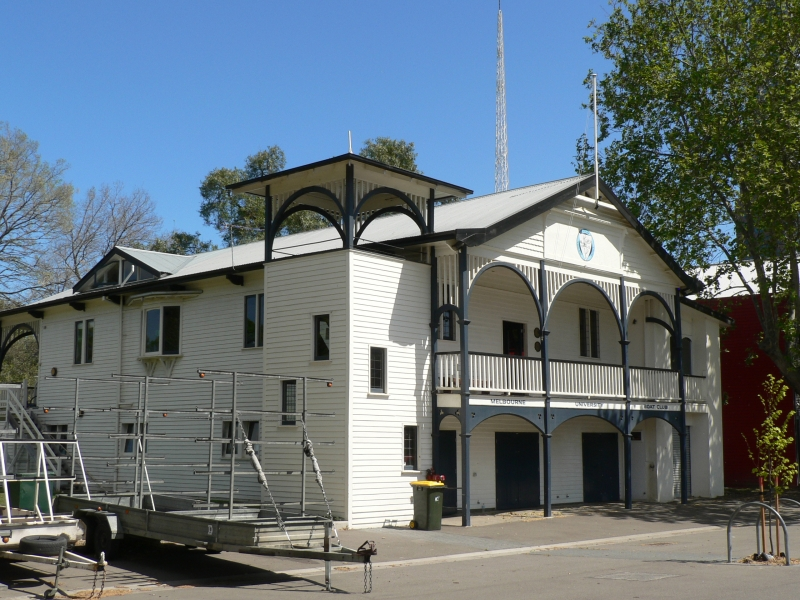
Boat shed of the Melbourne University Boat Club

Melbourne University Boat Club is a rowing club in Melbourne, Australia. Its clubhouse or "boat shed" is listed on the Victorian Heritage Register in 2000. According its website, the club claims to be "the oldest rowing club in Australia". In 2015, a MUBC men's eight set the fastest time for a Head of the Yarra race.

== See also ==
- Australian Boat Race
- Sydney University Boat Club
