= Henry Halloran (poet) =

Australian poet and civil servant (1811–1893)

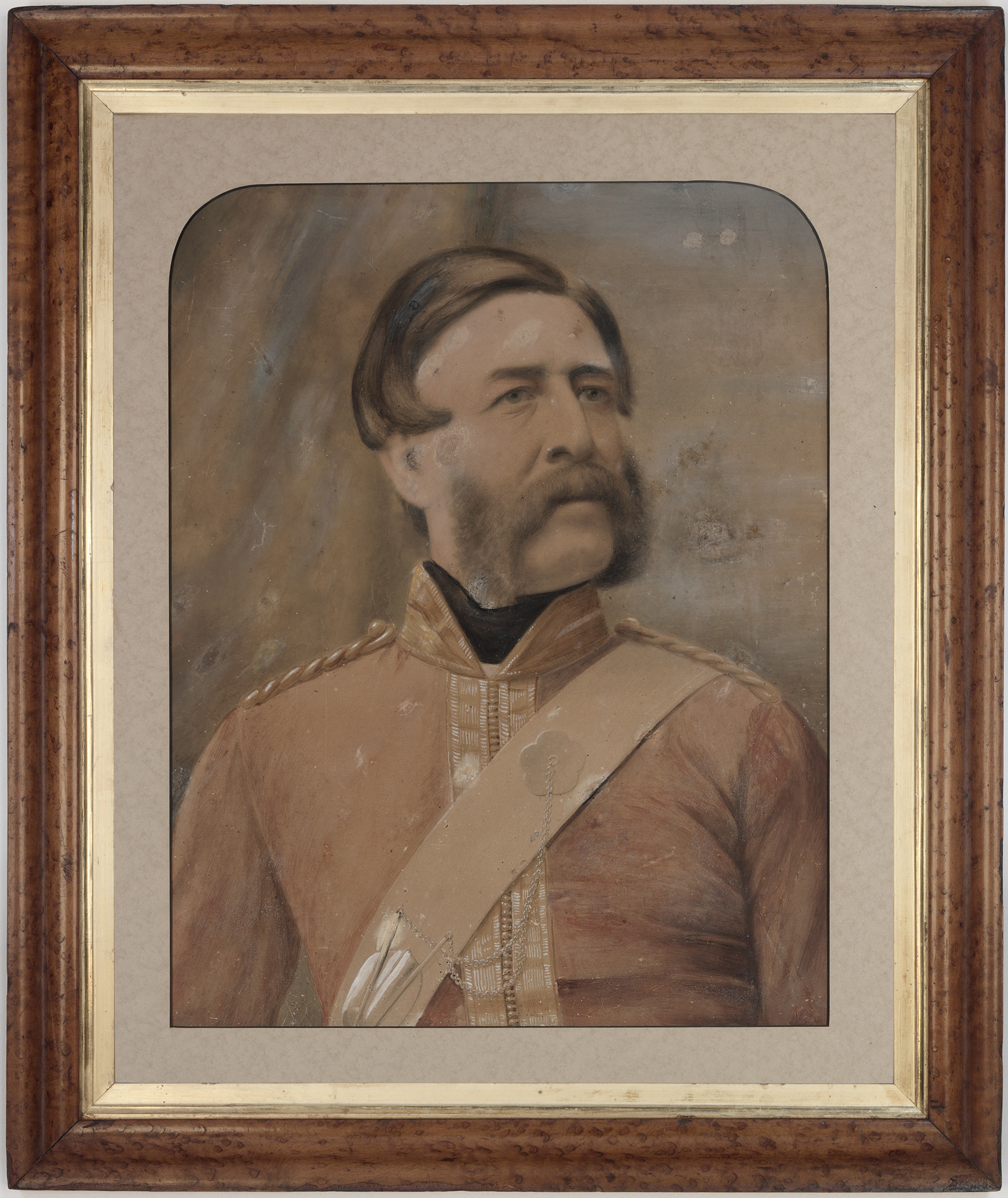
- Born: 6 April 1811; Cape Town, South Africa
- Died: 19 May 1893 (aged 82); Ashfield, New South Wales, Australia
- Known for: Public servant, poet
- Spouses: Elizabeth Henrietta, Julia Margaret Guerin

Henry Halloran was an Australian poet and civil servant who was born in Cape Town, Cape Colony on 6 April 1811.

== Early life ==
Henry Halloran was born on 6 April 1811, at Cape Town, Cape Colony, to Laurence Hynes Halloran and Lydia Anne, née Hall. After living in England for some years, he arrived in Sydney, Colony of New South Wales, in 1822 with his mother where they were reunited with his father. He was educated at his father's school before starting his career as a clerk in the NSW Public Service.

== Career as Public Servant ==
Halloran became a clerk in the Survey Department in 1827, later becoming chief clerk. In 1859, the Crown Lands Office and Survey Department merged under his supervision.

In February, 1866, Halloran was appointed the under-secretary in the Colonial Secretary's Department by Henry Parkes. A year later, Parkes appointed Halloran a justice of the peace. In 1867 and 1873, Halloran was involved in making arrangements for significant events such as welcoming the Duke of Edinburgh and the public funeral of William Charles Wentworth.

For five years [1875 to 1880], Halloran was a N.S.W. commissioner for exhibitions in Philadelphia, Melbourne, Paris and Sydney. After 1878, Halloran was made a Companion of the Order of St Michael and St George (C.M.G.) and retired with a pension. He set up as a land agent but shortly after, he retired.

== Career as Poet ==
From the 1840s, Halloran's verses could be found in magazines and newspapers, and he became included in Sydney's literary circles. He was known for supporting and encouraging young writers, even reportedly finding Henry Kendall a job in the Colonial Secretary's Department. Daniel Deniehy often praised Halloran's verses as “remarkable for their classic grace” and for their “manly gentleness”. He also reportedly said that Halloran held “the truest title to the rank of poet”. Halloran also made translations of the Greek poems of Anacreon.

After he retired from the public servant life, he chose to write poetry at his home in Mowbray, Ashfield. Halloran's later poetry, written for special occasions, often revealed his loyalty to the throne. These poems were not well received and were considered unimaginative and conventional. Halloran published [in 1887] Poems, Odes and Songs and [in 1890] A Few Love Rhymes of a Married Life.

== Personal life ==
Halloran's first marriage was in 1841 to Elizabeth Henrietta, the daughter of Joseph Underwood, with whom he had eight children, four boys and four girls before she died in 1889. He was later married to Julia Margaret "Bella" Guerin, at St. Patrick's Cathedral, Melbourne, on 29 June 1891; they had one son: Henry Marco James Halloran (1892–1981).

== Death ==
On 19 May 1893, Halloran died at Ashfield. He was buried in St John's Church of England cemetery. His funeral was attended by, amongst other officials, Henry Parkes.

== Bibliography ==
- The Discovery of Eastern Australia and The Unveiling the Captain Cook Statue (1879) (Note: This title is correct as per the published volume.)
- Prize Poems on the International Exhibition of New South Wales, 1879 (1879)
- Poems, Odes, Songs (1887)
- A Few Love Rhymes of a Married Life, Sydney: Turner and Henderson, Printers (1890)
- Two Early Poems of 1833 (1977)

== See also ==
- Laurence Halloran, father
- Henry Halloran, grandson
- Julia Margaret "Bella" Guerin, second wife
