= Laurence Hynes Halloran =

Irish convict transported to Australia

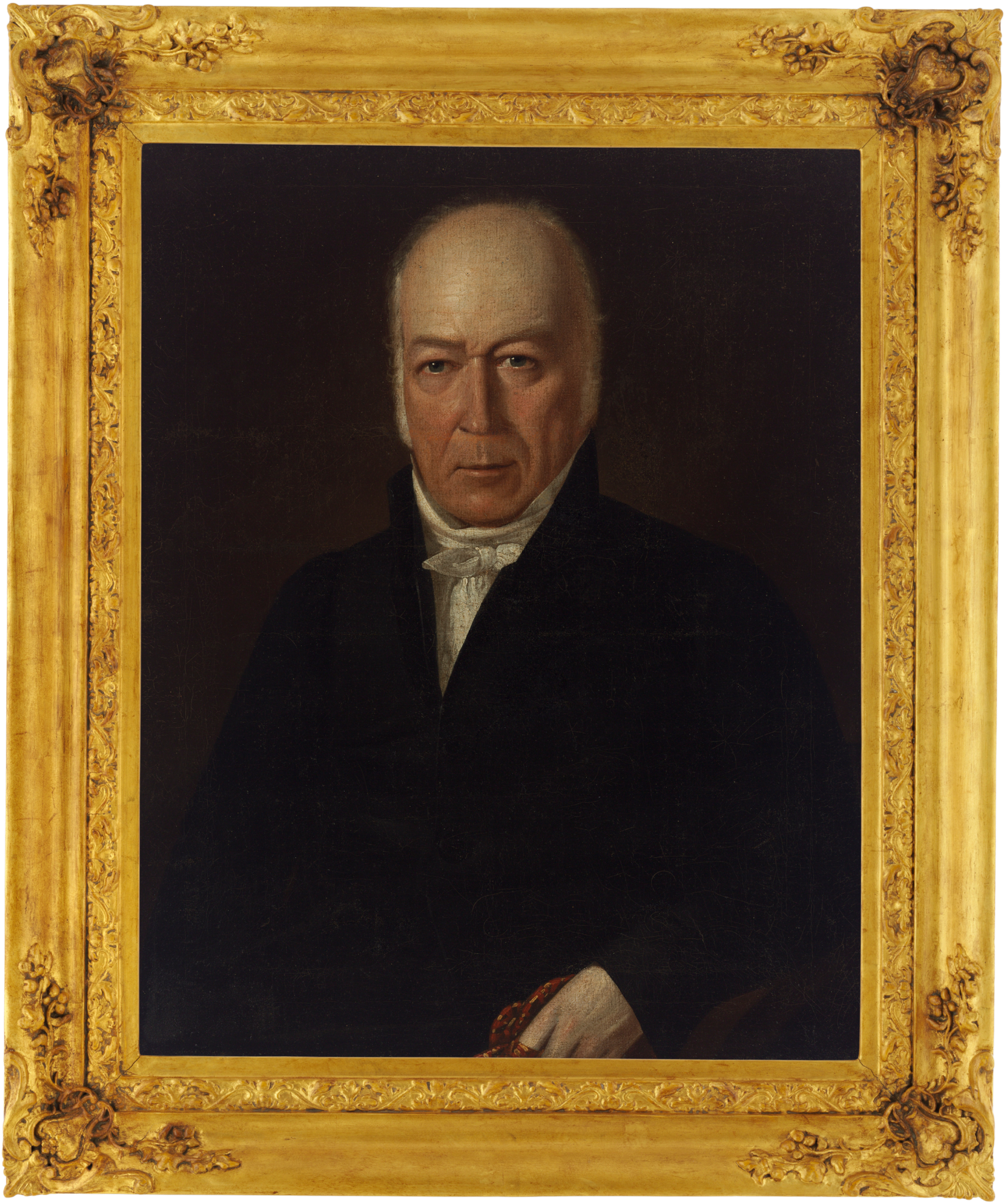
Laurence Hynes Halloran, ca. 1825, State Library of New South Wales

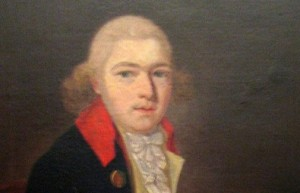
Portrait of Laurence Hynes Halloran

Laurence Hynes Halloran (29 December 1765 – 8 March 1831) was a poet, unordained clergyman and felon who became a pioneer schoolteacher, journalist, and bigamist in Australia, founder of the Sydney Public Free Grammar School.

== Early life ==
Halloran was born in County Meath, Ireland and was orphaned while young. He was placed in the care of an uncle, Judge William Gregory, and educated at Christ's Hospital. He entered the navy in 1781 but was gaoled two years later for stabbing and killing a fellow midshipman.

He claimed falsely to have been ordained by Thomas O'Beirne, Bishop of Ossory.

The following year, he was posing as a clergyman in Bath.

It was subsequently necessary for the governor of the colony to declare valid those marriages conducted by Halloran during his time in South Africa. Returning to England in 1811, he resumed his pose as a clergyman under half a dozen aliases in a variety of English parishes, also teaching and writing poetry.

== Private life ==
Halloran was born a Catholic, but became an Anglican in 1792. While living in Exeter he married Mary ("Polly") Boutcher, a Catholic lady ten years older than him, by whom he had six children. His sister's illegitimate daughter Anna (12 years younger than him) also posed as his wife, and they had twelve children together. The year after her death in Australia in 1823, Halloran bigamously married 16-year-old Elizabeth Forrester Turnbull by whom he had four more children.

== Legacy ==
There is ample evidence from his dismissals from clerical office in England that the Anglican authorities there held that he had never been properly ordained.

== See also ==
- List of convicts transported to Australia
- Henry Halloran (son)
- Henry Halloran (great-grandson)
