= Mary Elizabeth Brown =

Early female graduate of University of Sydney

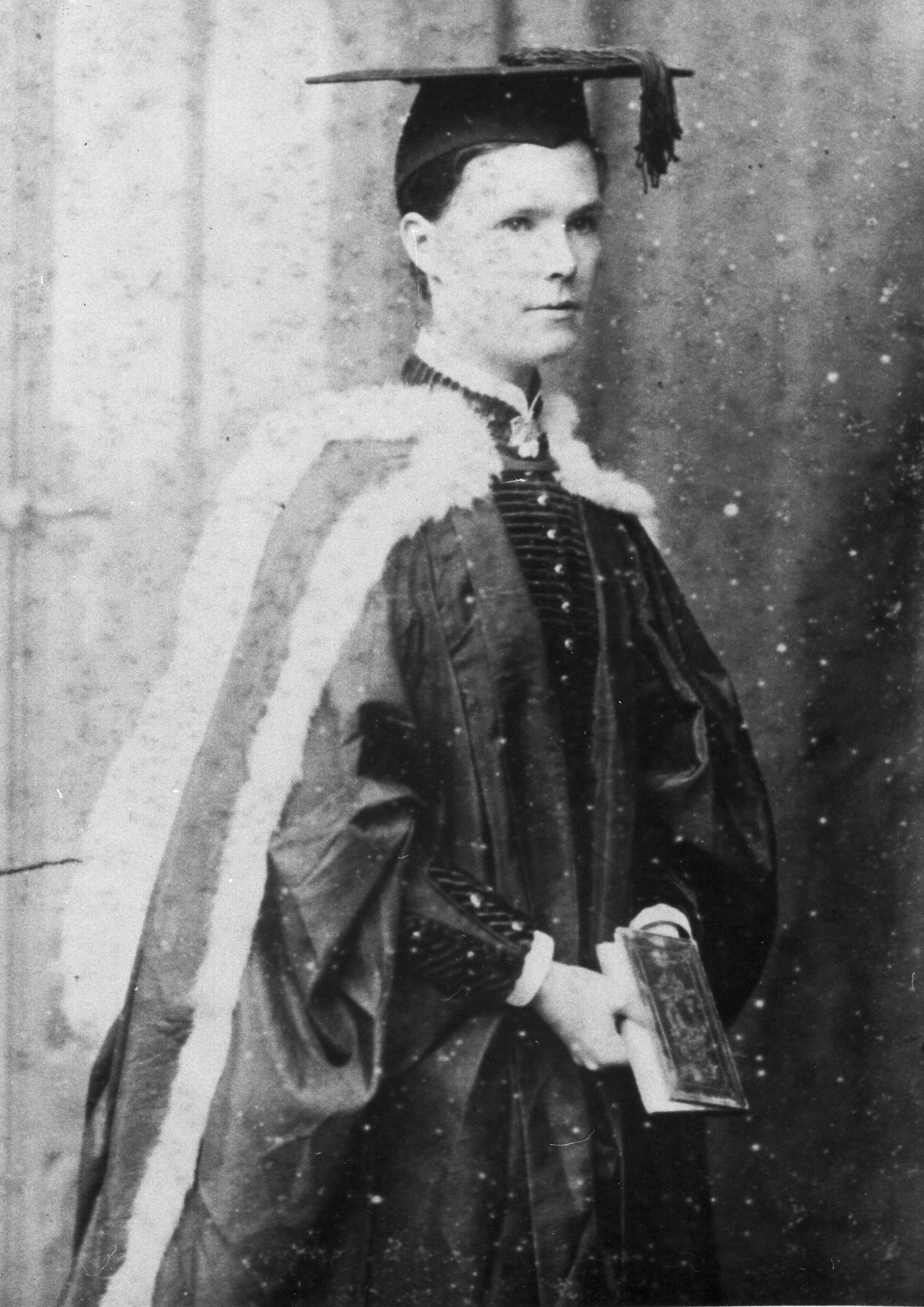
- Graduation (1885).
- Born: 21 January 1862; Savaiʻi, Samoa
- Died: 1 May 1952 (aged 90); Sydney, Australia
- Education: University of Sydney

Mary Elizabeth Brown (21 January 1862 – 1 May 1952) was one of the first women graduates of the University of Sydney (1885).

== Early life ==
The daughter of Rev. Dr. George Brown, D.D., F.R.G.S. (1835–1917), and Sarah Lydia Brown (1838–1923), née Wallis, Mary Elizabeth Brown was born in Savaiʻi, Samoa in 1862, and lived her early years in Samoa. Her father, a Methodist missionary who had moved to Samoa in 1860, was also a collector of artifacts; and part of his collection is exhibited at the National Museum of Ethnology, in Osaka, Japan. Elizabeth, the second of seven children, was born and lived her early years in Samoa.

She was sent, together with her eldest sister Amy, to her grandparents in Auckland, New Zealand, for her education, becoming one of the first pupils at the Auckland Girls' High School which opened in 1877, and when the Browns moved to Sydney in January 1881, she entered the ladies' college, the Argyle School, in Albion Street, Surry Hills, as a pupil.

== Years at the University of Sydney ==
1882 was the first year in which female students were admitted to the University of Sydney. In June 1882 Brown passed the matriculation exam for the University of Sydney (1 of 74 admitted that year), and was admitted to studying Classics, Mathematics (Class I) and Natural Science (Class II), and was awarded the Walker Bursary No 4. Despite her significant family responsibilities, she successfully completed her studies at the university, and passed the examination for the Bachelor of Arts degree in 1885. (Note: The University of Adelaide was the first Australian university to admit women as graduating students (in 1876), the University of Melbourne was the second (in 1881), the University of Sydney was the third (in 1882), and the University of Tasmania was the fourth (on its inception in 1890) (JK.1). Bella Guerin, who graduated B.A. from the University of Melbourne in December 1883, was the first woman to graduate from any Australian University; and, in December 1885, she was the first woman to graduate M.A. from any Australian University. In May 1885, Isola Florence Thompson, (B.A.) and Mary Elizabeth Brown, (B.A.), who had both enrolled in 1882, were the first women to graduate from Sydney University (IN.1); and, in May 1887 (DT.1), Thompson was the first woman to graduate M.A. from Sydney University. In December 1885, Edith Emily Dornwell, B.Sc. was the first woman to graduate from Adelaide University (PA.1). Eliza Helen Wilson (1869–1933), who graduated B.A. from the University of Tasmania in December 1896, was the first woman to graduate from the university of Tasmania (HM.1). She went on to graduate M.A. in April 1903 (TN.1). Maude Ethel Leggett (1876–1911) (B.A., Tasmania, 1897) was the first woman to graduate M.A. from the University of Tasmania, in November 1899 (HM.2).) Brown was often at the top of her class in Classics, Mathematics, Natural Science, and Chemistry.

== Career ==
Not much is known about Brown's personal life, except that she never married, nor about her teaching career. In April 1885 she became a teacher in the Brisbane Girls Grammar School. During the annual speech day held at the Grammar School in 1897, the Headmistress made reference to 'a very successful dancing class held by Miss Brown during the second and third quarters' of that year'. When her sister Amy died in 1904, leaving seven children, the youngest only one week old, She helped her mother care for the children. In 1908, when her father returned to his hometown of Durham in England, Mary and one of her sisters followed him, and helped with the writing of his autobiography (i.e., GB.1).

== Death ==
Brown died in Sydney on 1 May 1952, aged 90, and was cremated at the Rookwood Crematorium on 2 May 1952.

== Legacy ==
=== The Brown Fellowship at the University of Sydney ===
The Equity fellowships were introduced by the university in 2009. The Brown Fellowship is one of these, named after Mary Elizabeth Brown. The aim of the Brown Fellowships is to assist university researchers, both male and female, whose careers have been interrupted by the undertaking of sustained primary caring duties. The Brown fellowship provides substantial relief from teaching and administrative responsibilities and allows Fellows to focus on their research while re-establishing or enhancing their academic research careers.

== See also ==
- George Brown (1835–1917)
