= Isola Florence Thompson =

Australian educator (1861–1915)

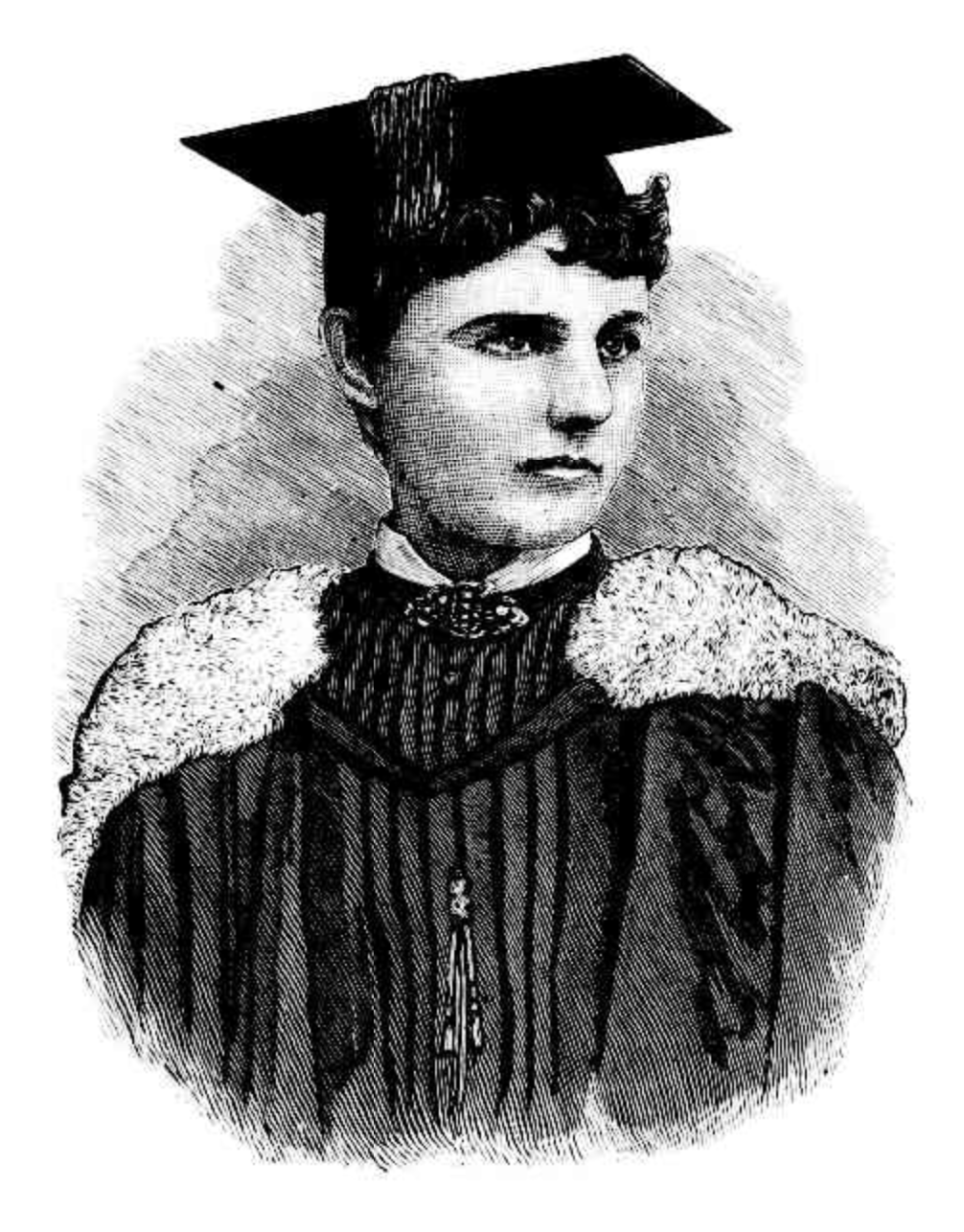
- Isola Florence Thompson on her graduation in 1885
- Born: 18 November 1861; Newcastle, New South Wales, Australia
- Died: 8 December 1915 (aged 54); Stanmore, New South Wales, Australia
- Burial place: Rookwood Cemetery
- Education: University of Sydney, BA, MA
- Employer: Sydney Girls High School

Isola Florence Thompson (18 November 1861 – 8 December 1915) was an Australian educator. One of the first two women to graduate from the University of Sydney, she was the first to complete a Master of Arts at the same university.

== Family ==
The daughter of Joseph Thompson (1831–1884), and Elizabeth Hannah Thompson (1831–1889), née Stiles, Isola Florence Thompson was born in Newcastle, New South Wales on 18 November 1861. Her father, Joseph Thompson was headmaster there, before moving the family to Albury where he was again headmaster of the public school.

== Education ==
She was successful in passing the Department of Public Instruction's entrance exam for teaching. On completing her schooling she was educated at home by her father and later by Mr C. A. Flint MA. In 1882, she was one of the first women to sit for and pass the matriculation examination. Three years later she and Mary Elizabeth Brown were the first two women to graduate from the University of Sydney with a bachelor of arts degree. (Note: The University of Adelaide was the first Australian university to admit women as graduating students (in 1876), the University of Melbourne was the second (in 1881), the University of Sydney was the third (in 1882), and the University of Tasmania was the fourth (on its inception in 1890) (JK.1). Bella Guerin, who graduated B.A. from the University of Melbourne in December 1883, was the first woman to graduate from any Australian University; and, in December 1885, she was the first woman to graduate M.A. from any Australian University. In May 1885, Isola Florence Thompson, (B.A.) and Mary Elizabeth Brown, (B.A.), who had both enrolled in 1882, were the first women to graduate from Sydney University (IN.1); and, in May 1887 (DT.1), Thompson was the first woman to graduate M.A. from Sydney University. In December 1885, Edith Emily Dornwell, B.Sc. was the first woman to graduate from Adelaide University (PA.1). Eliza Helen Wilson (1869–1933), who graduated B.A. from the University of Tasmania in December 1896, was the first woman to graduate from the university of Tasmania (HM.1). She went on to graduate M.A. in April 1903 (TN.1). Maude Ethel Leggett (1876–1911) (B.A., Tasmania, 1897) was the first woman to graduate M.A. from the University of Tasmania, in November 1899 (HM.2).)

She continued studying at the University of Sydney and graduated with a master of arts in 1887, the first woman to achieve this higher degree at Sydney University.

== Career ==
On graduation she was employed by Sydney Girls High School as a teacher. Thompson remained on the staff of Sydney Girls High for 29 years, mainly in the role of first assistant (now deputy principal). She retired due to ill health in April 1914 and 400 former pupils of the school attended a presentation in her honour, including Dr Lucy Gullett and Ethel Turner.

== Death ==
Thompson died on 8 December 1915 in a private hospital in Stanmore, New South Wales. She was buried in Rookwood Cemetery.

An obituary by Jean in The Sydney Morning Herald, with the subheading "Kind and True", acknowledged Thompson as a "well-loved figure in school history" and noted:

Her old girls are playing their part fittingly to-day—doctors and nurses in Egypt, France, and England. Red Cross workers in our midst, scholars teachers, writers, mothers of boys and girls will turn over the page as pages are so often turned over in these days, with a wistful sadness and a sweet memory of loving kindness.

— Jean, The Sydney Morning Herald

A former pupil, M.W., wrote of how she "helped to mould the personalities of the hundreds of girls who passed through her hands" and remembered her kindness.
