= Sydney University Boat Club =

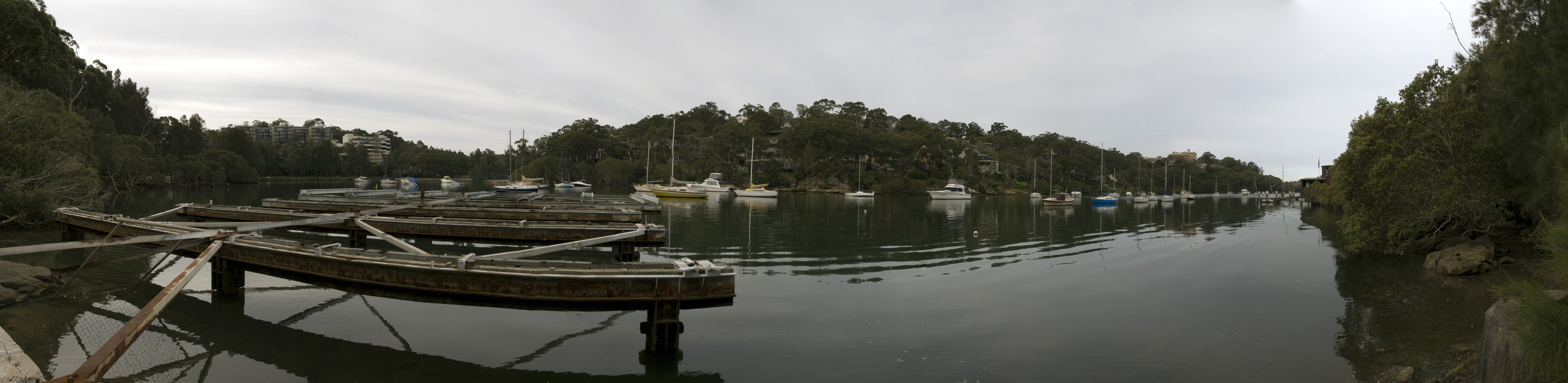

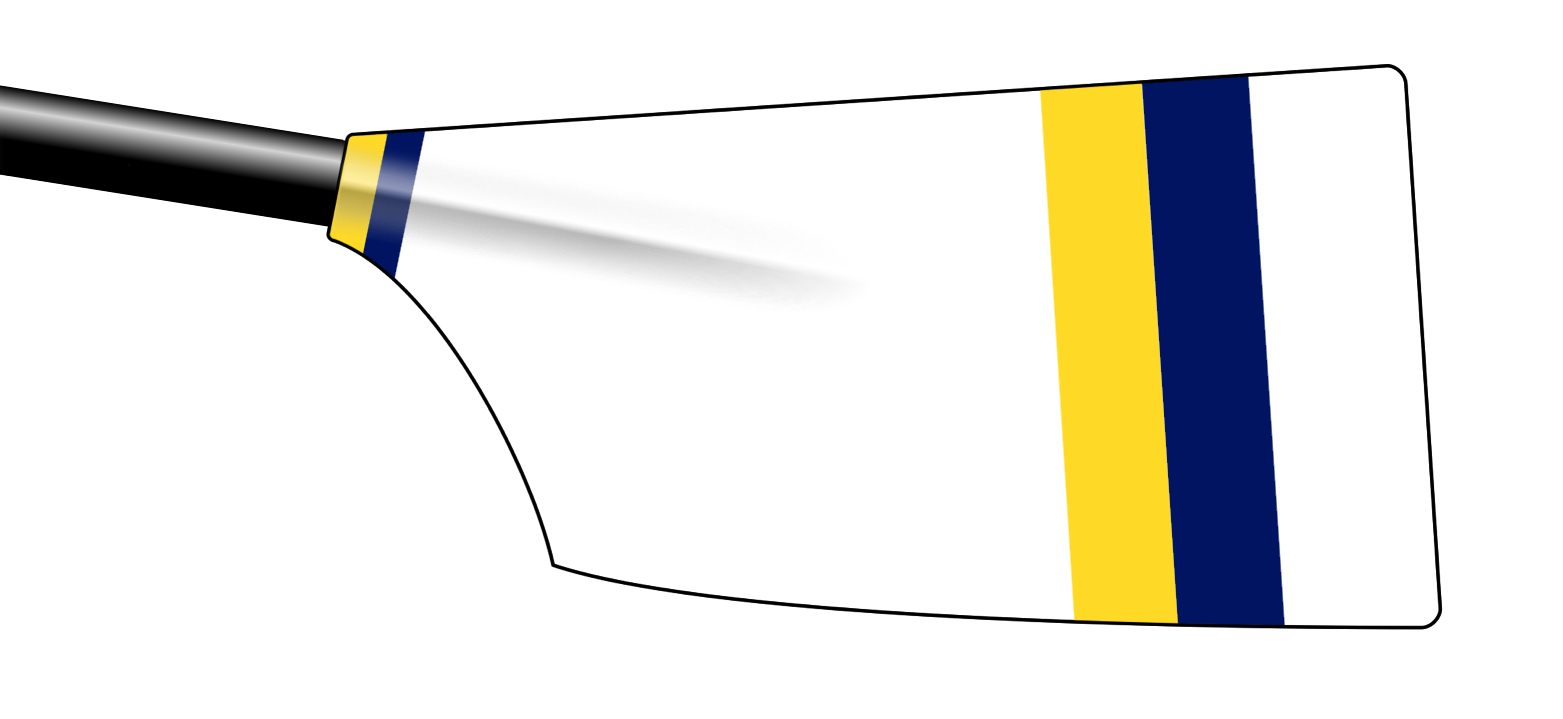
- Location: Linley Point & Glebe Sydney, Australia
- Home water: Burns Bay, Lane Cove River
- Affiliations: NSW Rowing Association
- Website: www.subc.org.au

Sydney University Boat Club is the rowing club in Sydney, Australia with the oldest charter having been formed in 1860 by the founders of the University of Sydney. It has had a boatshed presence in various locations on Sydney Harbour since 1886, excepting between 1941 and 1966. A varsity and recreational club during most of its history, the Boat Club has since the 1990s had a focus on its high performance and elite rowing programs. Supported by the university's Sports Union the club has developed an increasing number of Olympic representative oarsmen and women in the new millennium with club members rowing in twenty-two seats in those Australian Olympic crews who represented between Athens 2004 and Tokyo 2021.

== History ==
The Sherington/Georgakis reference quotes research that University archives record a meeting of officers of the SUBC and election of officeholders at point prior to 1861 and probably 1860. The university's first Chancellor Sir Charles Nicholson was named as the club's first president. This reference is the basis of the club's 1860 heritage claim.

The first inter-university boat race was rowed in Melbourne in December, 1870. The Sydney University crew were all members of the then newly formed Sydney Rowing Club, being E. A. Iceton (bow), Edmund Barton, Dick Teece and Allan Yeomans (stroke). In 1885 the Sydney University Boat Club's first annual general meeting was held with Barton elected chairman at that inaugural meeting. A site was obtained in Woolloomooloo near that of the Woolloomooloo Bay Rowing Club and the Sydney Rowing Club's first shed and a clubhouse was built and opened in June, 1886. The Sydney Morning Herald announced the club's fifth annual general meeting in 1891, giving credence to a true 1885 start date.

The club's contemporary rise to success in producing consistent national representative elite oarsmen and women has been driven by club president, Chris Noel from 1987. Noel is a boatshed alumnus from the 1960s and 1970s and was elected President of the SUBC in 1987. He became a personal financial benefactor the club; represented the club in senior positions on the University Sports Union and Senate Management committees; mentored athletes and coaches and drove a rowing sporting scholarship program. Noel was conferred an Honorary Fellowship of the university in 2007.

== Boatshed locations ==
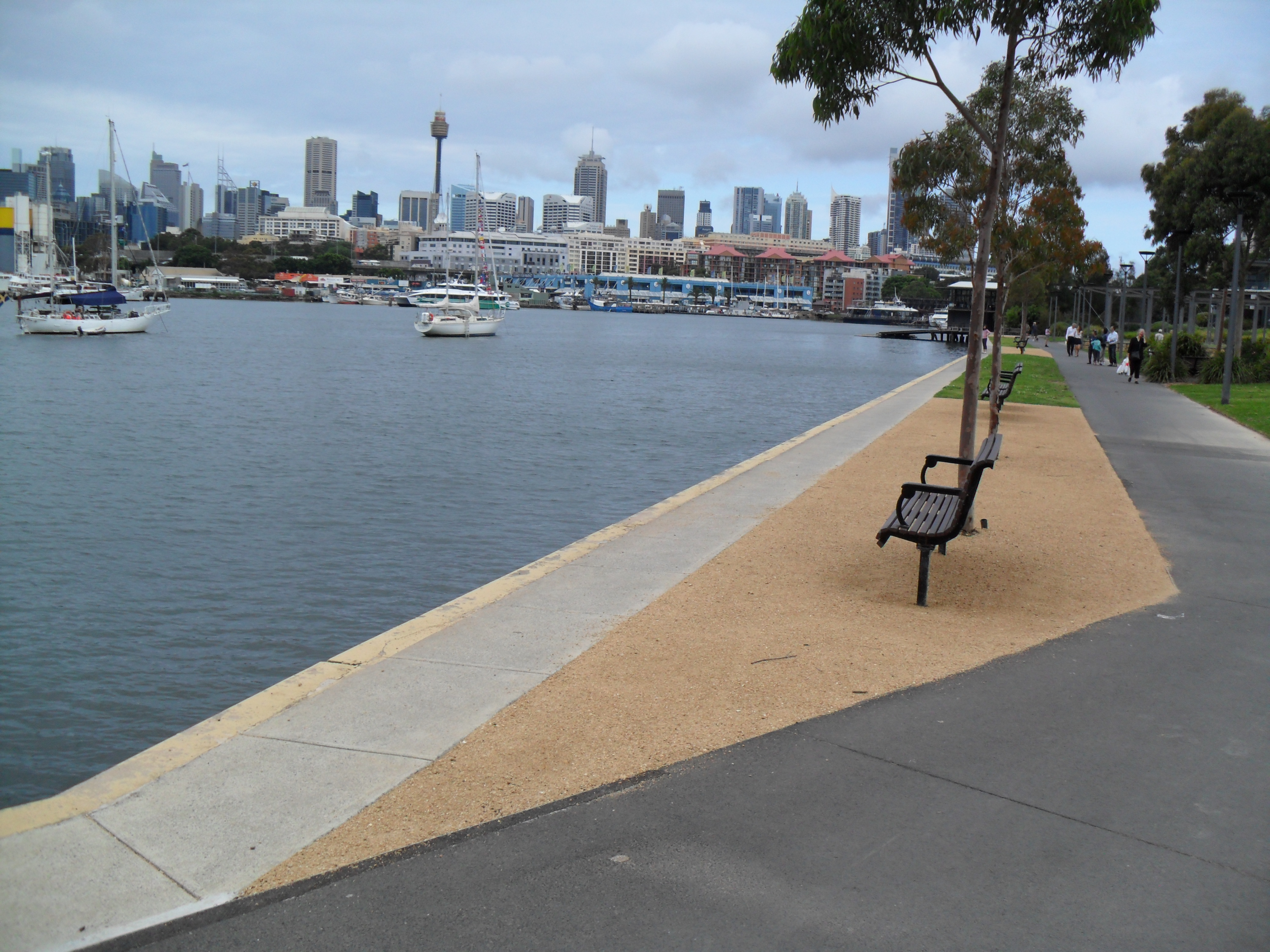
The SU Women's boatshed at Blackwattle Bay is the 1st building along the right shoreline

The Sydney University Boat Club's first boatshed was opened in June, 1886 on Woolloomooloo Bay on Sydney Harbour. By 1902 the club became dissatisfied with the Woolloomooloo location, being too far from the university and the harbour water too rough. In 1902, the old shed was re-erected at Glebe Point and a new shed was completed in 1907 to accommodate the club's 150 odd members.

In 1940, the university's Sports Union recommended demolition of the Blackwattle Bay clubhouse which was carried out in 1941. After the end of the war, efforts to find an alternative site commenced and were not finally successful until 1966.

In 1957 the university was bequeathed a property in Drummoyne and its suitability for a boat shed site was considered and disputed between 1957 and 1961. Work had started by 1960 but ceased by 1963. In 1964 the club shifted its attention to finding suitable land at Linley Point on Burns Bay and a lease was obtained from the Maritime Services Board. A shed and pontoon were completed in 1966 at a cost of $71,500.

The SUBC's Linley Point boatshed was destroyed by fire in 2006. It became evident from 2009 that the club was looking to build another much larger shed at Cunningham's Reach Park in Lane Cove on Crown land. This proposal was unpopular with some local residents resulting in protests and actions in 2010 & 2011. The objections were successful. In 2012 Lane Cove Council voted to submitted a rezoning request for the SUBC's prior Linley Point site to allow for development to include recreation facilities and a cafe. Since the fire and during the redevelopment planning and dispute period the SUBC borrowed facilities at the University of New South Wales' old boatshed at Tarban Creek on Sydney's Parramatta River.

In 2017 after an eleven-year consultation, planning and construction period a new shed was opened at the Linley Point location on Burns Bay. Consultation was led by alumnus oarsman and former lightweight world champion Michael Wiseman.

The Sydney University Women's Rowing Club row out of a boathouse located at the foot of Ferry Road, Glebe at Blackwattle Bay. This shed was the location of the Glebe Rowing Club for over 100 years until the 1990s.

== Competition history & representative success ==
Intercollegiate rowing in fours was introduced in 1892 between the colleges of University of Sydney and at that same time University representative crews began competing in the club competition run by the New South Wales Rowing Association. In 1896, the SUBC supplied five rowers and the coach of the intercolonial eight. Sydney won six of the intervarsity races of the 1890s with Melbourne winning three and Adelaide one. From 1893, the race was rowed for the Oxford and Cambridge Cup presented by old Oxford and Cambridge boat race oarsmen. In the first twenty-five years of intervarsity competition to 1913 the SUBC won the Cup on 14 occasions. Until 1907 both alumni and undergraduates were able to compete in the varsity competitions.

The SUBC had little success in either Association races or the intervarsity contests of the 1910s. With the competition suspended from 1915 to 1918, Melbourne University Boat Club won five of the six intervarsity races held and Adelaide won the other. Sydney trailed the field in 1920 when Queensland University competed for the first time and fared poorly throughout the 1920s winning only in 1926. During the 1930s the SUBC was seen only rarely in open club races but made its mark in intervarsity competitions for the Oxford and Cambridge Cup with six wins and four seconds in the ten-year period. By the end of the 1930s decade, Sydney had scored a total of 20 wins in the competition to date against Melbourne's 17, and Adelaide University Boat Club next best with 5.

Though without a boatshed from 1941, the Boat Club managed to be competitive after World War II beating the Sydney Rowing Club to a state championship in 1949 and beating Haberfield to the same title in 1951. SUBC men dominated the New South Wales King's Cup crew in 1950 and had seven seats (including the cox) in the gold medal-winning Australian men's eight for the 1950 British Empire Games. The club won the Oxford and Cambridge Cup at the intervarsity competition in 1947, 1948 & 1949. Club fortunes had reversed ten years later and in 1956, 1957 and 1958 the SUBC finished fourth at intervarsity and was unable to field crews for the state championships.

Boat club members (and club alumni rowing at other Sydney clubs) represented at Olympic level at Helsinki 1952, Rome 1960, Mexico City 1968 and Montreal 1976 (see below). Ted O'Loughlin had a seat in the Australian men's eight at the 1974 World Rowing Championships in Lucerne while Anthony Anisimoff and Phil Winkworth represented in a coxless four at the 1979 World Rowing Championships in Bled. Under the drive of club president Chris Noel the club's high-performance program began to bear fruit from 2004 and took off when Brooke Pratley became the SUBC's first world champion in 2006. Five oarsmen and women were sent to Beijing 2008 winning two silver medals and nine club members were selected for London 2012.

== Members ==
Notable members include:

- Edmund Barton Australia's first Prime Minister was the SUBC's first chairman from 1885. In 1870, while at the time a competitive member of the Sydney Rowing Club, he represented the SUBC in the inaugural Australian intervarsity competition in Melbourne.
- Mervyn Finlay and Bob Tinning rowed at the Boat Club as undergraduates and later won Olympic bronze when seniors at the Leichhardt Rowing Club.
- Vic Middleton a 1952 Olympian had rowed at the Boat Club as an undergraduate.
- John Boultbee AM a club secretary and competitive coxswain at the SUBC, has been an Australian Olympic Team Manager (Rowing Montreal 1976), the fifth Director of the AIS and a judge of the Court of Arbitration for Sport.

Olympic representatives (while club-members) include:

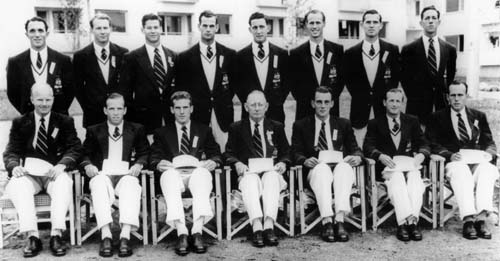
Pain (back 4th from right) in the 1952 Olympic squad to left of Finlay & Middleton and behind Tinning (seated right)

- Edward Pain won a bronze medal in the men's eight at Helsinki 1952 and a gold medal at the 1950 British Empire Games.
- John Hudson stroked the men's 4+ at Rome 1960; Lionel Robberds coxed that crew as an SUBC member following his nine-year association with Leichhardt.
- John Ranch won silver in the men's eight at Mexico City 1968.
- Ian Luxford competed in the men's 2- at Montreal 1976.
- Kyeema Doyle competed in the women's eight at Athens 2004.
- Marty Rabjohns coxed the men's eight at Beijing 2008.
- Sarah Cook rowed in a coxless pair at Beijing 2008 and in the eight at London 2012.
- Francis Hegerty and Matt Ryan both won a silver medal in the 4- at Beijing 2008 and competed at London 2012 in the men's eight.
- Brooke Pratley won silver in a double scull at London 2012 and competed in the women's eight at Beijing 2008.
- Sally Kehoe competed in the women's eight at Beijing 2008, at London 2012 and has been selected in the W2X for Rio 2016.
- Toby Lister and Nick Purnell competed in the men's eight at London 2012; Brodie Buckland competed in the coxless pair; Bronwen Watson in a lightweight double scull.
- Jack Hargreaves and Alexander Purnell were Tokyo 2020 Olympic champions in the M4-.

World champions include:

- Brooke Pratley, double scull 2006.
- Bronwen Watson, dual world champion lightweight sculler.
- Jack Hargreaves, back-to-back world champion M4-, 2017 & 2018.

== See also ==
- Australian Boat Race
- Melbourne University Boat Club
