= Edith Emily Dornwell =

Australian educator

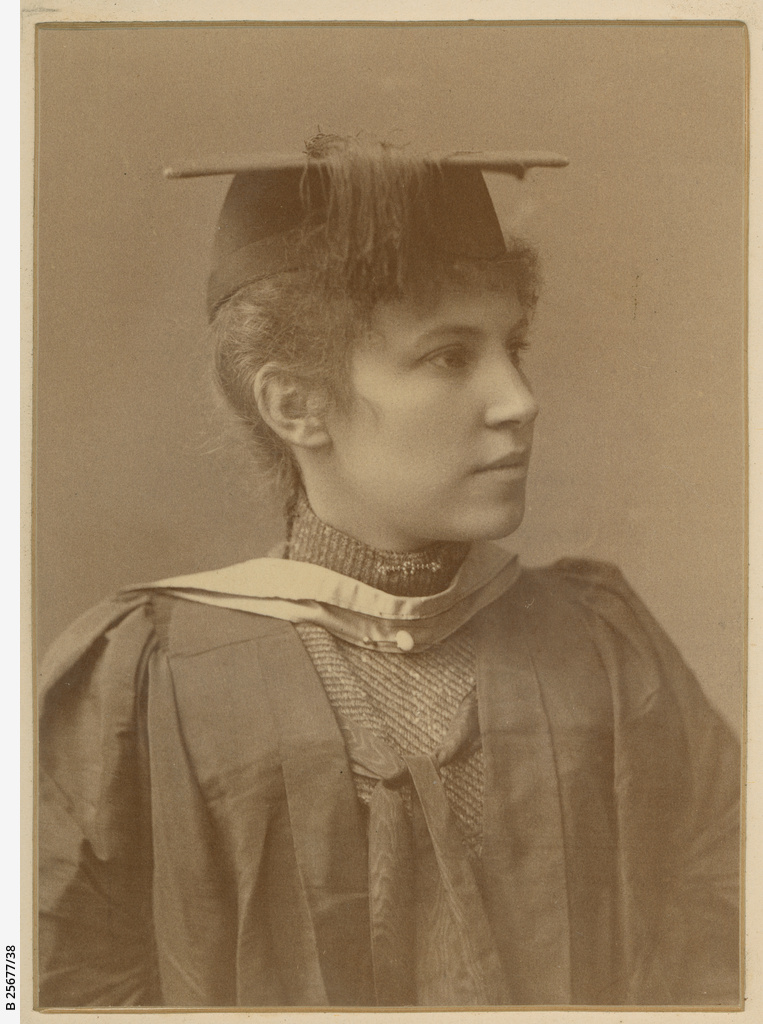

Edith Emily Dornwell BSc (31 August 1865 – 18 November 1945) (later Raymond) was the first woman in Australia to graduate with a science degree, the first woman to graduate from the University of Adelaide, and the first person, male or female, to graduate with a science degree at the University of Adelaide.

== Family ==
The daughter, and first child, of German immigrant Bernhardt Carl Friedrich "Bernard" Dornwell (1842–1885), and Sarah Ann Dornwell (1839–1931), née Phillips, later Mrs. Frederick William Newman, Edith Emily Dornwell was born in New Zealand on 31 August 1865. The family later moved to Adelaide, South Australia.

Dornwell married Lionel Charles Raymond (1868–1943), at St Andrew's Church, Walkerville on 13 February 1895. They had two children: Oliver Claude Raymond (1895-1980), and Roland Lionel Raymond (1899–1964).

== Education ==
Dornwell initially studied at the Grote Street Model School; and, following her father's early death (she was just 14), Dornwell won a bursary to attend the Advanced School for Girls (now Adelaide High School) the only state high school in South Australia during the 19th century. Whilst at this school in 1880 she won first prize and £20 for the "Exhibition for Girls" examination. She matriculated in 1882 with honours in French, German, animal physiology and modern history.

=== University of Adelaide ===
Dornwell was accepted into a Bachelor of Science degree at the University of Adelaide in 1883, just two years after the university had amended its charter to enrol women. (Note: The University of Adelaide was the first Australian university to admit women as graduating students (in 1876), the University of Melbourne was the second (in 1881), the University of Sydney was the third (in 1882), and the University of Tasmania was the fourth (on its inception in 1890) (JK.1). Bella Guerin, who graduated B.A. from the University of Melbourne in December 1883, was the first woman to graduate from any Australian University; and, in December 1885, she was the first woman to graduate M.A. from any Australian University. In May 1885, Isola Florence Thompson, (B.A.) and Mary Elizabeth Brown, (B.A.), who had both enrolled in 1882, were the first women to graduate from Sydney University (IN.1); and, in May 1887 (DT.1), Thompson was the first woman to graduate M.A. from Sydney University. In December 1885, Edith Emily Dornwell, B.Sc. was the first woman to graduate from Adelaide University (PA.1). Eliza Helen Wilson (1869–1933), who graduated B.A. from the University of Tasmania in December 1896, was the first woman to graduate from the university of Tasmania (HM.1). She went on to graduate M.A. in April 1903 (TN.1). Maude Ethel Leggett (1876–1911) (B.A., Tasmania, 1897) was the first woman to graduate M.A. from the University of Tasmania, in November 1899 (HM.2).) She was one of the first women to enrol at the university and their first student, male or female, to enrol in a science program. Dornwell excelled in her studies. In April 1883, she received the Sir Thomas Elder Prize in Physiology, for which she received a microscope. In 1889, a representative of the University of Adelaide stated that,

"The most brilliant student in the science course, up to the present, has been a woman— Miss E Dornwell, who passed the first, second, and third year of that course first class in elementary physiology. As will be seen by reference to the winners of Sir T. Elder's prizes the women have been distinctly superior to the men."

Encouraged by her physiology teacher, Professor Edward Stirling, Dornwell stated,

"Dr Stirling said that if I were successful, and he was convinced that I would be, I would gain the distinction of being the first woman graduate of the university, and the first woman to graduate in science in Australia."

Dornwell graduated in 1885 with first class honours in physics and physiology. At her graduation the university's chancellor, Chief Justice Sir Samuel Way said "In your distinguished undergraduate career, and in the manner in which you have taken that degree, you have not merely done honour to the University, but you have vindicated the right of your sex to compete, and to compete on equal terms, with other undergraduates for the honours and distinctions of the University."

== Teaching career ==
Following her graduation Dornwell taught mathematics, physics, Latin and physiology at her former school, the Advanced School for Girls. In 1887 she moved to Hawthorn, Victoria and became the resident teacher at the Methodist Ladies College; and, in 1890, she accepted the post as headmistress at the private Riviere Ladies' College in Woollahra, New South Wales.

Whilst at Riviere, as one of the 65 applicants, she applied for the position of principal at the newly established Women's College at Sydney University: the position was eventually (unanimously) awarded to Miss Louisa Macdonald (B.A., M.A., London) in December 1891.

== Later life ==
Following her marriage in 1895, Dornwell moved to Fiji where he husband, Lionel, had accepted a post with the CSR Limited. The couple went on to raise their two sons, Oliver and Roland, who were sent from Fiji back to Sydney to continue their secondary education in Australia. Upon her husband's retirement Dornwell returned to Sydney where she was active in the Lyceum Club and the National Council of Women.

== Death ==
Dornwell died in Sydney 18 November 1945, aged 80.
