= Oxford and Cambridge Cup =

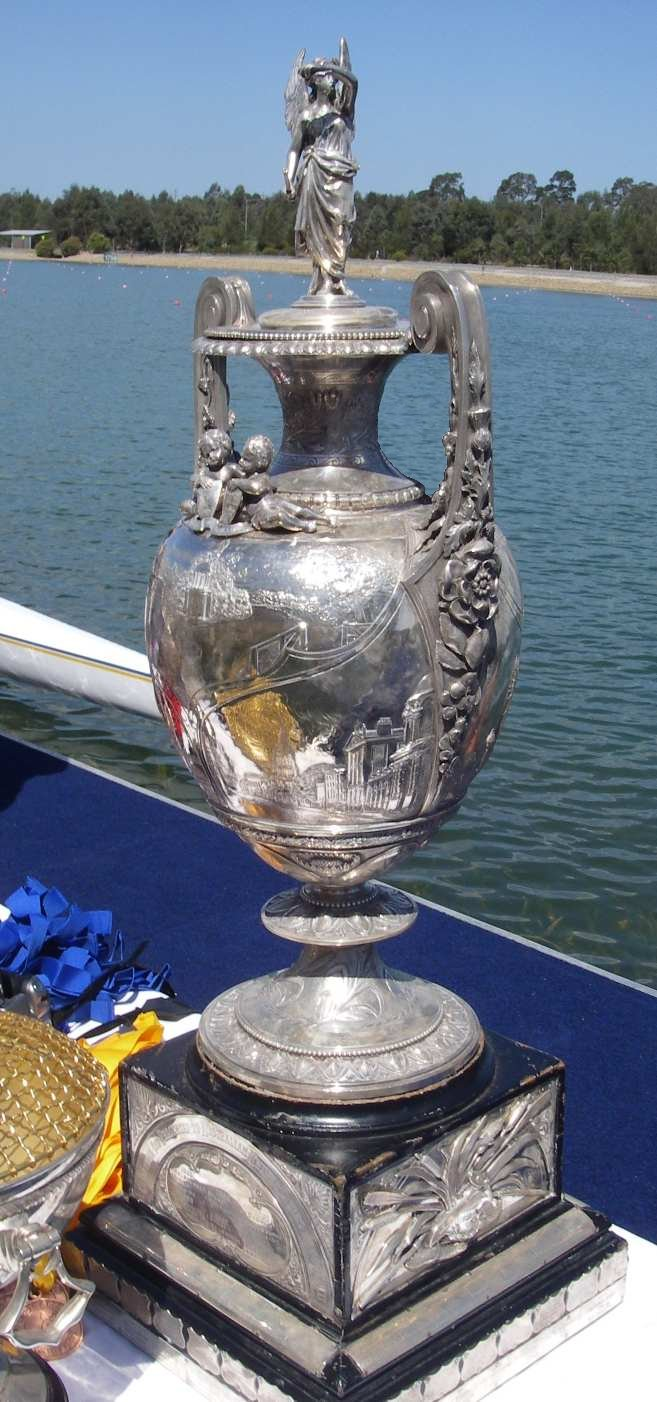
The Oxford and Cambridge Cup is awarded for Inter-Varsity Men's Eights in Australia.

The Oxford and Cambridge Cup is the trophy awarded to the winner of the Australian University Championship Men's Eight (formerly the Australian Universities Boat Race), and is competed for annually at the Australian University Games or the Australian University Rowing Championships (in either case, commonly known as the Inter-Varsity). It is the oldest inter-University competition in Australia. The cup is awarded to the winning men's Eight over a standard 2,000m course (1.24 miles).

The trophy was donated in 1893 by Old Blues of the Universities of Oxford and Cambridge. The original boat race was conducted over a 'Thames Putney Mortlake' equivalent course, which varied between 2 miles and 3 1/2 miles depending on location and conditions.

== History ==
The first Australian Universities Boat Race was raced in 1888 on the Yarra River, between the Universities of Adelaide, Melbourne and Sydney. The trophy was organised by Dr Edmond Warre, Headmaster of Eton College and former President of the Oxford University Boat Club. He suggested to the Old Blues of Oxford and Cambridge that a trophy be donated for Inter-University Eight competition in order to foster a continuing interest in the young competition. In an 1890 letter to Frederick Halcomb (Captain of the Adelaide University Boat Club) he states that "the idea was accepted by them with alacrity" and that they were "proud of the opportunity afforded them of showing their brotherhood, goodwill and interest in the welfare of their kinsmen in the antipodes”. The cup was sent out to Australia in time for the 1893 competition, where it was competed for and won by Melbourne.

The cup features scenes in bas-relief of Cambridge, Oxford, rowers and the floral emblems of the countries of England, Scotland and Wales. The Angel on the top is pictured in the traditional pose of the Toast to Rowing. This long standing and traditional toast is afforded the winners of the Grand Challenge Cup.

== Inter-Varsity competition ==
The Australian Universities Boat Race began in 1870 when four oared crews representing Sydney and Melbourne Universities competed over a three-and-a-half-mile course on the Yarra River (Melbourne). Members of the crews also took part in the first cricket match between the two universities. The first race was won by Melbourne in 31 minutes and 4 seconds. The 2-man of the losing Sydney crew was Edmund Barton, who went on to become the first Prime Minister of Australia.

The first eight oared race between Australian Universities was conducted in 1888. Melbourne, Sydney and Adelaide Universities met on the Hombourg reach course of the Yarra River. Melbourne was recorded as having won by 5 lengths over Adelaide and a similar distance to third place Sydney. Adelaide achieved its first win in 1889 at their home course on the Port River, and again in 1896 when stroked by famed South Australian oarsman W.H. Gosse. Sydney's first win was in 1890.

In 1920, Queensland University entered a crew for the first time. The crew came third. Queensland steadily improved and, under the leadership of stroke E.B. Freeman, went on to win the 1922 and 1923 boat races.

The University of Tasmania boated its first inter-varsity crew in 1924. The Taswegians took the trophy home the following year in 1925. This crew, stroked by R.A. Scott, defeated the highly fancied Sydney crew on the Brisbane River.

The University of Western Australia followed their interstate brethren and boated their first crew in 1927. This crew, stroked by F.A. Williams, took the cup home in their debut race.

With the development of tertiary education in Australia in the 1950s and 1960s it was not long before numerous additional universities sought entry into the boat race. In 1956 New South Wales, 1963 Monash, 1966 Australian National and Newcastle, 1969 La Trobe and 1973 Macquarie Universities gained entry. The Australian higher education reforms of the early 1990s opened the door for many former Technical Colleges and Colleges of Advanced Education to enter the boat race for the first time.

1968 was the last year that the race was held over the traditional 'Thames Putney Mortlake' equivalent course. Due to increasing pressure for a standardised course distance, fairer courses, and the increasing focus of state and national programs on the Olympic distance, delegates from the competing University Boat Clubs of 1968 voted that all future races be conducted over a 2,000m course from 1969 onward.

== Results by Year ==
Date	Venue	Distance	Winner	Runner up	Time	Margin
6 October 1888	Lower Yarra, VIC	2.5 mi	Melbourne	Adelaide	13:05	4 lengths
21 December 1889	Port River, SA	2.5 mi	Adelaide	Melbourne	18:06	3 lengths
14 June 1890	Lower Yarra, VIC	2.5 mi	Sydney	Melbourne	13:48	5 lengths
4 April 1891	Parramatta River, NSW	3 mi	Sydney	Melbourne	17:21	4 lengths
23 April 1892	Port River, SA	3 mi	Melbourne	Sydney	17:21	6 feet
8 April 1893	Lower Yarra, VIC	3 mi	Melbourne	Sydney	16:05	2.5 lengths
28 April 1894	Parramatta River, NSW	3 mi	Sydney	Melbourne	17:00	10 lengths
11 May 1895	Port River, SA	3 mi	Sydney	Melbourne	15:45	6 lengths
2 May 1896	Lower Yarra, VIC	3 mi	Adelaide	Sydney	20:41	6 lengths
22 May 1897	Parramatta River, NSW	3 mi	Sydney	Melbourne	18:08	4 lengths
4 June 1898	Port River, SA	3 mi	Sydney	Adelaide	18:07	6 lengths
10 June 1899	Lower Yarra, VIC	3 mi	Melbourne	Sydney	23:02	5 lengths
2 June 1900	Parramatta River, NSW	3 mi	Sydney	Adelaide	17:01	54 seconds
15 June 1901	Lower Yarra, VIC	3 mi	Sydney	Melbourne	16:48	0.5 lengths
14 June 1902	Port River, SA	3 mi	Sydney	Melbourne	16:44	3 lengths
6 June 1903	Parramatta River, NSW	3 mi	Sydney	Melbourne	15:36	5 lengths
4 June 1904	Lower Yarra, VIC	3 mi	Melbourne	Adelaide	18:01	3 lengths
10 June 1905	Port River, SA	3 mi	Sydney	Adelaide	17:37	5 lengths
9 June 1906	Parramatta River, NSW	3 mi	Melbourne	Sydney	15:15	3 lengths
9 June 1907	Lower Yarra, VIC	3 mi	Sydney	Melbourne	15:53	2 lengths
6 June 1908	Port River, SA	3 mi	Sydney	Melbourne	15:45	2 lengths
9 June 1909	Parramatta River, NSW	3 mi	Sydney	Melbourne	15:50	5 lengths
7 June 1910	Lower Yarra, VIC	2.5 mi	Adelaide	Sydney	17:35	4 lengths
10 June 1911	Port River, SA	3 mi	Melbourne	Sydney	16:29	1.5 lengths
1 June 1912	Parramatta River, NSW	3 mi	Melbourne	Sydney	17:00	3 lengths
7 June 1913	Lower Yarra, VIC	2.5 mi	Melbourne	Sydney	15:11	6 lengths
6 June 1914	Port River, SA	3 mi	Melbourne	Adelaide	17:46	7 lengths
1915–1918	World War I – No competition					
29 August 1919	Parramatta River, NSW	3 mi 167yd	Melbourne	Sydney	19:34.5	3 lengths
29 May 1920	Lower Yarra, VIC	2.5 mi	Adelaide	Melbourne	14:53	1.5 lengths
31 May 1921	Brisbane River, QLD	3 mi	Melbourne	Queensland	17:23	1 length
3 June 1922	Port River, SA	3 mi	Queensland	Melbourne	17:21	4 lengths
1 June 1923	Parramatta River, NSW	3 mi 167yd	Queensland	Adelaide	17:43	4 lengths
31 May 1924	Lower Yarra, VIC	2.5 mi	Melbourne	Queensland	16:14	0.5 length
6 June 1925	Brisbane River, QLD	3 mi	Tasmania	Sydney	17:56	2.5 lengths
3 June 1926	Huon River, TAS	3 mi	Sydney	Melbourne	?	3/4 length
4 June 1927	Nepean River, NSW	3 mi	Western Australia	Melbourne	19:30	1.5 lengths
2 June 1928	Mannum, SA	3 mi	Western Australia	Melbourne	16:43	2 lengths
1 June 1929	Lower Yarra, VIC	2.5 mi	Melbourne	Adelaide	14:27	3.5 lengths
7 June 1930	Swan River, WA	3 mi	Western Australia	Adelaide	19:57	3/4 length
3 June 1931	Brisbane River, QLD	3 mi	Sydney	Queensland	17:40	12 lengths
1932	Huon River, TAS	3 mi	Western Australia	Sydney	17:19	5 lengths
3 June 1933	Nepean River, NSW	3 mi	Sydney	Adelaide	16:29	2 lengths
2 June 1934	Mannum, SA	3 mi	Adelaide	Sydney	15:30	7 lengths
8 June 1935	Lower Yarra, VIC	2.5 mi	Sydney	Melbourne	15:17	1/3 length
6 June 1936	Swan River, WA	2 mi	Sydney	Western Australia	12:30	3 lengths
5 June 1937	Brisbane River, QLD	3 mi	Sydney	Tasmania	17:00	2.5 lengths
4 June 1938	Huon River, TAS	3 mi	Sydney	Melbourne	15:44	1.5 lengths
3 June 1939	Nepean River, NSW	3 mi	Melbourne	Sydney	16:38	1.5 lengths
1 June 1940	Nepean River, NSW	3 mi	Melbourne	Sydney	16:57	4 lengths
1941–1945	World War II – No competition					
8 June 1946	Mannum, SA	3 mi	Melbourne	Adelaide	17:58	1 length
7 June 1947	Nepean River, NSW	3 mi	Sydney	Melbourne	16:51	1.5 lengths
5 June 1948	Swan River, WA	2 mi	Sydney	Western Australia	12:11	Unknown
5 June 1949	Brisbane River, QLD	<2 mi	Sydney	Melbourne	11:00	2 lengths
3 June 1950	Lower Yarra, VIC	2 mi	Melbourne	Sydney	10:50	3 lengths
30 May 1951	Huon River, TAS	3 mi	= Melbourne	= Sydney	14:46	Dead heat
7 June 1952	Murray Bridge, SA	3 mi	Melbourne	Sydney	17:21	2.5 lengths
5 June 1953	Nepean River, NSW	3 mi	Melbourne	Western Australia	16:13	0.5 lengths
5 June 1954	Swan River, WA	2 mi	Melbourne	Western Australia	11:38	1.5 lengths
4 June 1955	Brisbane River, QLD	3 mi	Melbourne	Queensland	17:54.5	8 lengths
2 June 1956	Lower Yarra, VIC	2.25 mi	Melbourne	Western Australia	13:07	4 lengths
7 June 1957	Derwent River, TAS	3 mi	Melbourne	Queensland	15:31	2 lengths
1958	Port River, SA	3 mi	Queensland	Melbourne	17:48	4.75 lengths
30 May 1959	Nepean River, NSW	3 mi	Queensland	Sydney	16:05.5	0.25 lengths
1 June 1960	Swan River, WA	2 mi	Sydney	Melbourne	10:21.8	2 lengths
27 May 1961	Brisbane River, QLD	2 mi	Sydney	New South Wales	11:05	4 lengths
26 May 1962	Nepean River, NSW	3 mi	Sydney	Melbourne	15:30	0.75 lengths
25 May 1963	Lower Yarra, VIC	2.25 mi	Melbourne	Sydney	12:14.5	4 lengths
30 May 1964	Huon River, TAS	2.25 mi	Sydney	Melbourne	15:39	5.4 sec
1965	No competition					
28 May 1966	Mannum, SA	3 mi	Tasmania	New South Wales	16:10	2 lengths
27 May 1967	Nepean River, NSW	3 mi	Melbourne	Tasmania	15:55.1	0.75 lengths
25 May 1968	Canning River, WA	2 mi 88'	Melbourne	Adelaide	10:05.3	0.5 sec
31 May 1969	Lake Wendouree, VIC	2000m	Melbourne	Sydney	6:26.9	1 length
23 May 1970	Lake Burley Griffin, ACT	2000m	Melbourne	Sydney	6:38.9	1.75 lengths
22 May 1971	Lake Kurwongbah, QLD	2000m	Monash	Sydney	6:35.0	0.1 sec
27 May 1972	Taree, NSW	2000m	Monash	Sydney	7:33.0	1.25 lengths
19 May 1973	Mildura, VIC	2000m	Monash	Melbourne	5:31.2	0.05 sec
25 May 1974	Nepean River, NSW	2000m	Adelaide	Melbourne	5:39.4	5.0 sec
17 May 1975	Huon River, TAS	2000m	Melbourne	Tasmania	5:57.4	3.0 sec
15 May 1976	Lake Wendouree, VIC	2000m	Tasmania	Adelaide	6:21.6	1 length
22 May 1977	West Lakes, SA	2000m	Melbourne	Adelaide	6:39	0.75 lengths
20 May 1978	Nepean River, NSW	2000m	Monash	Adelaide	5:58.1	5.5 sec
19 May 1979	Hinze Dam, QLD	2000m	Adelaide	Sydney	6:01	2.3 sec
17 May 1980	Lake Burley Griffin, ACT	1800m	Melbourne	Sydney	5:31.9*	1.9 sec
16 May 1981	Canning River, WA	2000m	Melbourne	Queensland	6:13.1	1.8 sec
15 May 1982	Lake Wendouree, VIC	2000m	Melbourne	Sydney	6:22.0	5.1 sec
21 May 1983	Middle Harbour, NSW	2000m	Sydney	New South Wales	5:58.4	7.8 sec
19 May 1984	Lake Barrington, TAS	2000m	Melbourne	Sydney	6:11.56	1.96 sec
18 May 1985	Lake Wendouree, VIC	2000m	Melbourne	Monash	6:25.03	6.3 sec
17 May 1986	West Lakes, SA	2000m	Tasmania	Melbourne	6:41.34	1.73 sec
1987	Nepean River, NSW	2000m	Monash	Sydney	6:03.0	7.5 sec
14 May 1988	Lake Wivenhoe, QLD	2000m	Melbourne	Monash	6:18.0	4.0 sec
8 July 1989	Carrum, VIC	2000m	Monash	Melbourne	6:22.7	6.0 sec
7 July 1990	Lake Wivenhoe, QLD	2000m	Queensland	Adelaide	5:55.5	1.2 sec
5 October 1991	Nepean River, NSW	2000m	Queensland	Melbourne	6:12.36	8.10 sec
3 October 1992	West Lakes, SA	2000m	Queensland	Adelaide	6:48.99	7.0 sec
2 October 1993	Wellington Dam, WA	2000m	Sydney	Tasmania	Unknown	Unknown
1 October 1994	Lake Barrington, TAS	2000m	Tasmania	Sydney	Unknown	Unknown
1995	Lake Wendouree, VIC	2000m	Melbourne	Queensland	5:53.95	2.5 lengths
2 October 1996	Lake Burley Griffin, ACT	1800m	U.T.S.	Adelaide	5.38.26*	3.3 sec
4 October 1997	Penrith Lakes, NSW	2000m	Western Australia	U.T.S.	5:54.21	5.15 sec
3 October 1998	West Lakes, SA	2000m	Western Australia	Melbourne	5:49.95	3.35 sec
1999	Lake Wendouree, VIC	2000m	Melbourne	Sydney	Unknown	Unknown
6 October 2000	Lake Wendouree, VIC	2000m	Melbourne	Monash	Unknown	Unknown
28 September 2001	Penrith Lakes, NSW	2000m	Melbourne	Sydney	5:55.93	0.53 sec
2002	Lake Wendouree, VIC	2000m	U.T.S.	Melbourne	5:53.07	0.43 sec
4 October 2003	Lake Wivenhoe, QLD	2000m	U.T.S.	Sydney	5:41.0	0.75 lengths
2004	Lake Barrington, TAS	2000m	Sydney	Adelaide	5:57.20	3.18 sec
September 2005	Hinze Dam, QLD	2000m	Sydney	Queensland	5:51.62	3.08 sec
30 September 2006	Penrith Lakes, NSW	2000m	Sydney	Adelaide	5:51.76	0.64 sec
29 September 2007	Hinze Dam, QLD	2000m	Sydney	Adelaide	6:13.00	7.97 sec
3 October 2008	Penrith Lakes, NSW	2000m	Queensland	Sydney	6:56.03	4.95 sec
3 October 2009	Lake Burley Griffin, ACT	1800m	Adelaide	Sydney	5:10.09	3.39 sec
1 October 2010	Champion Lakes, WA	2000m	Adelaide	Sydney	5:47.9	0.6 sec
30 September 2011	Penrith Lakes, NSW	2000m	Melbourne	Adelaide	6:20.37	11.1 sec
28 September 2012	West Lakes, SA	2000m	Adelaide	Melbourne	6:02.27	11.8 sec
4 October 2013	Lake Wendouree, VIC	2000m	Sydney	Adelaide	5:57.97	7.02 sec
3 October 2014	Penrith Lakes, NSW	2000m	Sydney	Monash	5:59.40	3.57 sec
2 October 2015	West Lakes, SA	2000m	Sydney	Adelaide	6:16.40	11.05 sec
30 September 2016	Champion Lakes, WA	2000m	Adelaide	Sydney	5:43.35	1.25 sec
29 September 2017	Wyaralong Dam, QLD	2000m	Sydney	Melbourne	6.02.29	3.3 sec
27 September 2018	Wyaralong Dam, QLD	2000m	Sydney	Melbourne	5:43.53	6.44 sec
3 October 2019	Wyaralong Dam, QLD	2000m	U.T.S.	Sydney	5:49.85	3.37 sec
2020-2021	COVID-19 pandemic - No competition					
28 September 2022	Champion Lakes, WA	2000m	Sydney	U.T.S.	6:05.05	1.13 sec
27 September 2023	Wyaralong Dam, QLD	2000m	Sydney	Adelaide	5:41.74	4.38 sec
13 September 2024	Lake Burley Griffin, ACT	1800m	U.T.S.	Sydney	5:26.28	8.74 sec
2 October 2025	Wyaralong Dam, QLD	2000m	U.T.S.	Sydney	6:33.17	3.86 sec

=== Running total ===
The Oxford and Cambridge Cup has been won by eight universities since the inception of the competition. Melbourne and Sydney Universities have dominated, between them winning about two-thirds of the time. It has been won at least once by every state, but neither of the territories. All of Australia's "sandstone universities" have won the cup, and of the Group of Eight universities, the University of New South Wales is the only one not yet to have achieved a win.

The 126th race was conducted in 2025.

Rank	University	Times winner	Times runner up	First win	Last win
1	Melbourne	43	35	1888	2011
2	Sydney	42	40	1890	2023
3	Adelaide	11	25	1889	2016
4	Queensland	8	8	1922	2008
5	Western Australia	6	5	1927	1998
6	Monash	6	4	1971	1989
7	U.T.S.	6	2	1996	2025
8	Tasmania	5	4	1925	1994
