= Head of the Yarra =

Annual rowing regatta in Melbourne, Victoria, Australia

The Head of the Yarra is a rowing regatta held on the Yarra River in Melbourne, Australia. It is a head race, with each crew having a separate start time. Organized by Hawthorn Rowing Club, it is the largest eights-only rowing event in Australia, and is listed as one of the three most notable head races along with the Head of the River Race and the Head of the Charles. The regatta is limited to eights and was first run in 1957. There are no weight classed events, and coxswains are not weighed.

Currently, the race is run over an 8.0 km course (map) from the Henley staging in the centre of Melbourne to the Hawthorn Rowing Club in Hawthorn. The fastest crews usually complete the course in around 25 minutes, with the majority of crews taking between 30 and 40 minutes.

The 2017 running of the regatta, held on November 25, had 256 crews competing in 31 categories, with crews from all Australian states, New Zealand, Japan and the USA.

The 2018 Head of the Yarra was the event's 60th edition, and was held on November 24, 2019. There were 254 crews entered. The results included the fastest men's crew, being a composite crew from the Sydney and Adelaide Rowing Club s, in a time of 24 minutes 51 seconds, and the fastest women's crew, representing Mercantile Rowing Club, in a time of 27 minutes 42 seconds.

The race went on a one-year hiatus in 2020.

The Head of the Yarra is conducted by Rowing Victoria, a member of Rowing Australia, and each edition of the regatta has an entries and information page associated with it, for example the 2018 regatta: .
