= Alice McNamara =

Australian rower

Personal information
- Born: 22 February 1986 (age 40)
- Years active: 1990-2015

Sport
- Sport: Rowing
- Club: Melbourne Uni Boat Club
Medal record
Women's rowing
Representing Australia
World Rowing Championships
Gold medal – first place	2007 Munich	LW4x
Gold medal – first place	2008 Linz	LW4x

Dr. Alice McNamara (born 22 February 1986) is an Australian sports physician and former representative lightweight rower. She was a national champion and a back-to-back world champion in 2007 and 2008. She represented Australia at nine successive World Rowing Championships in lightweight sculling events.

== Club and state rowing ==
McNamara's senior rowing was done from the Melbourne University Ladies Boat Club.

From 2006 to 2017 on twelve successive occasions, she rowed in Victorian state representative crews contesting the Victoria Cup in the women's lightweight quad scull at the Interstate Regatta within the Australian Rowing Championships. She stroked those crews on six occasions including to their victory in 2006.

In MUBC colours she contested national titles at the Australian Rowing Championships on a number of occasions. She raced in the lightweight double scull in 2006, 2007 and 2008 winning the national championship in 2008; in the lightweight quad scull in 2006 and 2007; and she contested the lightweight single scull event in 2008 to an Australian title win in 2008.

== International representative rowing ==
McNamara first represented for Australia at the 2005 Rowing World Cup III in Lucerne. In 2005 and in 2006 she was selected to contest the World Rowing U23 Championships in the lightweight double scull. At both championships she raced with Jessica Huston, they won the bronze in Amsterdam in 2005.

McNamara was elevated to the senior Australian women's lightweight quad for the 2007 World Rowing Championships in Munich. Seated at three with Bronwen Watson, Miranda Bennett, and Tara Kelly they won their heat and lead the final from the 500 m mark to claim the gold and McNamara's first World Championships title.

For the 2008 World Lightweight Championships in Linz Austria, the 2007 quad stayed together with Kelly changed-out for Tasmanian Ingrid Fenger. McNamara stroked the boat to a thrilling victory. At the 500 m mark the Australians sat in fourth place behind Poland, the United States and Great Britain. They lifted their rate in the middle half and moved ahead of the American and British crews and turned their attention to chasing down the Poles who held a one and a half second lead at the halfway. In the final 500 m Australia surged past Poland and stormed to the line to take the gold in a time of 6:36.41, almost three seconds clear of Poland. This was McNamara's second World Championship title.

At Poznan 2009 McNamara raced a double scull with Bronwen Watson. They placed fifth. During 2010 and 2011 McNamara raced the international season with Hannah Every-Hall. At the 2010 World Rowing Cup II in Munich they rowed as a heavyweight double placing seventh, then at the WRC III in Lucerne they contested the lightweight event and won the gold. At the 2010 World Rowing Championships in Lake Karapiro they contested the lightweight double scull championship and placed fourth overall. They competed together at the World Rowing Cup III of 2011 and then at the 2011 World Rowing Championships in Bled, Slovenia placing fifth at both events.

At the 2012 lightweight World Championships McNamara raced as Australia's single sculls entrant. She placed tenth. For the next three years - 2013 to 2015 - McNamara regained her seat in Australia's lightweight double scull for all international representative regattas. She raced with Mia Simmonds in 2013 and with Ella Flecker in 2014 and 2015. She placed tenth, fifth and twentieth at the World Rowing Championships in each of those years.

== Academic and professional ==
McNamara completed undergraduate degrees at Melbourne University in Commerce, Science and as a Doctor of Medicine. She then pursued a Sports and Exercise speciality.
