= Fergus Pragnell =

Australian former rower (born 1985)

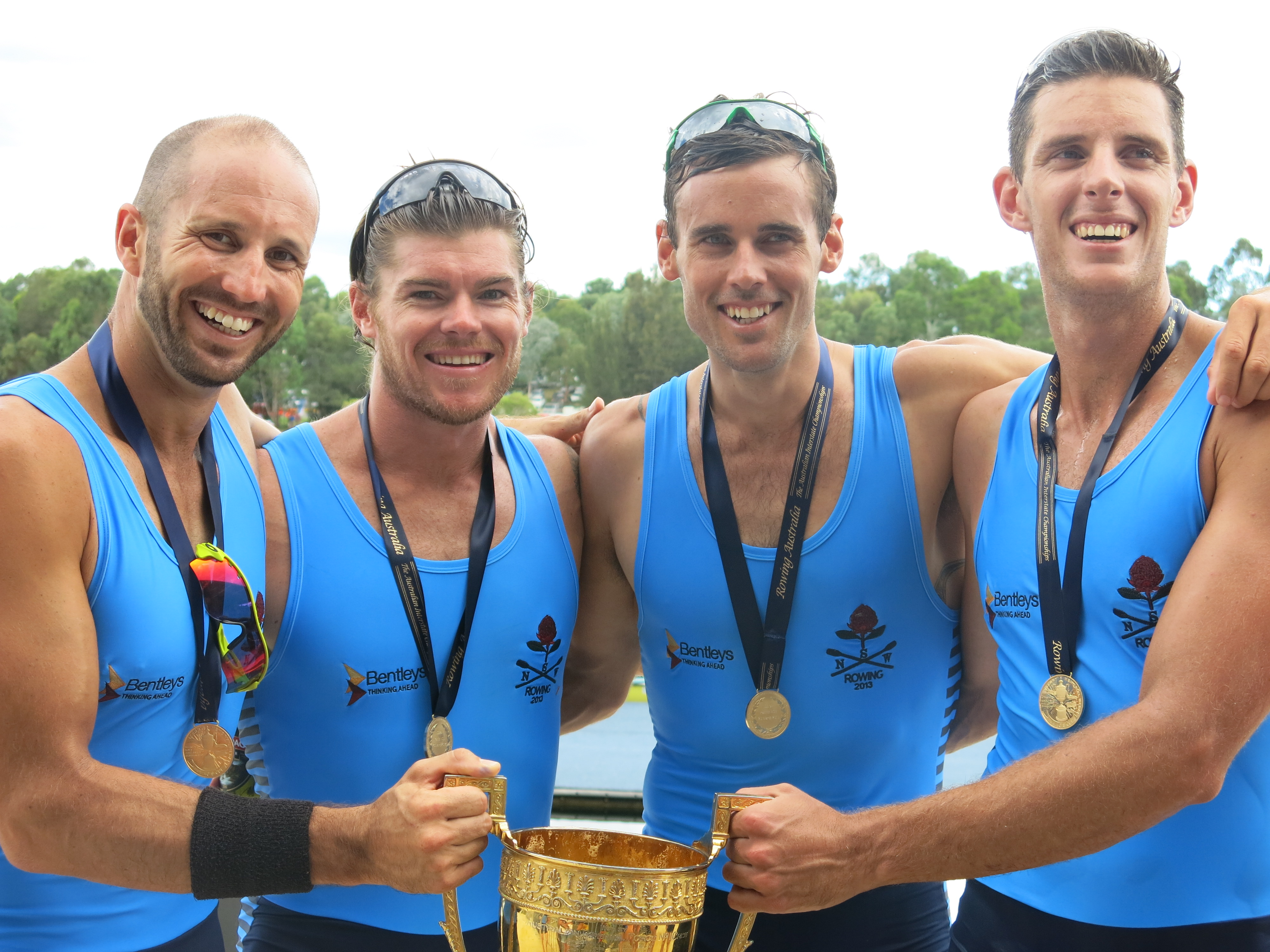
- James Chapman, Sam Loch, Matt Ryan & Pragnell with the Kings Cup in 2013 - the 6th time each oarsman won the event.

Personal information
- Born: 17 September 1985 (age 41)

Sport
- Sport: Rowing
- Club: Sydney University Boat Club
Medal record
Men's rowing
Representing Australia
World Rowing Championships
Bronze medal – third place	2014 Amsterdam	M4-
Bronze medal – third place	2008 Linz	M2-
World Rowing U23 Championships
Gold medal – first place	2004 Poznan	M4-
Silver medal – second place	2006 Hazewinkel	M4-

Fergus Pragnell (born 17 September 1985) is an Australian former rower. He is a seven-time Australian King's Cup winner, an U23 World Champion and a medallist at senior World Championships. He rowed for the Sydney University Boat Club and represented New South Wales in eleven consecutive King's Cup races from 2005 to 2015.

== State and club rowing ==
From Queanbeyan, New South Wales, Pragnell's senior club rowing was from the Sydney University Boat Club.

He first made state selection for New South Wales in the 2005 senior eight contesting the King's Cup at the Interstate Regatta within the Australian Rowing Championships. He raced eleven consecutive King's Cup races for New South Wales from 2005 to 2015 and won seven straight from 2008 to 2014. From 2009 to 2015 he was consistently seated in the pace-setting position of stroke or seven in the New South Wales eight.

== International representative rowing ==
Pragnell made his Australian representative debut in a coxless four at the World Rowing U23 Championships in Poznan in 2004. He stroked the crew of all New South Welshmen to a gold medal in a photo finish. In 2005 he was selected in an U23 eight who raced at the 2003 World Rowing Cup III in Lucerne before competing at the 2005 World Rowing U23 Championships in Amsterdam where they finished in eighth place. In 2006 he was again in a coxed four at the World Rowing U23 Championships. They rowed to a silver medal in Hazewinkel.

In 2007 he was elevated to the Australian men's senior squad racing in a coxless pair with at two World Rowing Cups in Europe with Jason Heard before they competed in a coxed pair with Marty Rabjohns on the rudder at the 2007 World Rowing Championships in Munich where they rowed to a fourth placing. The following year he again raced a coxed pair at the World Championships in Linz 2008 and rowed to a bronze medal with Nick Baxter and steered by Hugh Rawlinson.

In 2009 he was selected to the Australian men's senior eight and in the seven seat at the 2009 World Championships they missed the A final and finished in seventh place overall. In 2010 the gun Australian sweep-oared boats were the coxed pair and the men's eight which was half composed of the Australian four who'd won silver at Beijing 2008. Pragnell didn't make any of the other seats in the eight but was selected to row the coxless four at the 2010 World Rowing Championships with Joshua Booth, Bryn Coudraye and John Linke. They finished in seventh place. For 2011 the entire 2010 four moved into the Australian eight. They raced at the World Rowing Cup III in Lucerne and then at the 2011 World Championships in Bled, Pragnell stroked the eight to a fourth place finish. In the 2012 Olympic year Pragnell was vying for a seat in either the Australian men's coxless four or the eight but missed selection after racing in a coxless pair with Nick Hudson at the World Rowing Cups II and III in Europe that year. For London 2012 Will Lockwood was selected ahead of Pragnell in the four and then Pragnell and Hudson were beaten out for seats in the eight by Nicholas Purnell and Sam Loch. Pragnell was a reserve for the Olympic heavyweight squad.

From 2013 Pragnell's King's Cup teammate Spencer Turrin was the lynchpin in variations of the Australian men's coxless four who ultimately built a successful campaign to become 2017 World Champions. In 2014 Pragnell joined Turrin, Alex Lloyd and Josh Dunkley-Smith in that boat. They raced at three World Rowing Cups to medal success and then in the August of that year at the 2014 World Rowing Championships in Amsterdam they won the bronze medal.

2015 saw Pragnell return to the Australian men's eight which placed ninth at the 2015 World Rowing Championships in Aiguebelette, France. In 2016 Pragnell was in the Australian men's eight who were unsuccessful in attempting to qualify for the 2016 Rio Olympics at the final FISA qualification regatta.
