= Sally Newmarch =

Australian rower

Personal information
- Born: 2 June 1975 (age 51)

Sport
- Sport: Rowing
- Club: Torrens Rowing Club
Medal record
Women's rowing
Representing Australia
World Rowing Championships
Bronze medal – third place	Cologne 1998	W4X
Bronze medal – third place	St Catharines 1999	LW2X
Bronze medal – third place	Milan 2003	LW4X
Commonwealth Rowing Championships
Gold medal – first place	1994 Ontario	W4X
U23 World Championships
Gold medal – first place	1997 Milan	BW1X
Junior World Championships
Silver medal – second place	1993 Aarungen	JW1X

Sally Newmarch (born 2 June 1975), now known as Sally Callie, is an Australian former rower – a four-time national champion, a medal winning national representative who competed at World Rowing Championships from 1993 to 2004 and a three time Olympian.

== Club and state rowing ==
Newmarch attended Annesley College in Adelaide where she took up rowing. Her senior club rowing was from the Torrens Rowing Club in Adelaide.

From 1993 to 1998 she was selected as South Australia's single sculls representative to contest the Nell Slatter Trophy at the Interstate Regatta within the Australian Rowing Championships although in 1996 she was selected but did not start. In 1999 Newmarch changed down to lightweight status and at state level was then selected in South Australian lightweight quads contesting the Victoria Cup at the Interstate Regatta. She stroked that quad in 1999 and in 2000 to a Victoria Cup victory. In 2003 and 2004 she crewed further South Australian quads to Victoria Cup wins.

In Torrens Rowing Club colours she contested national championship titles at numerous Australian Rowing Championships. She contested the 1994 and the 1996 open women's single scull and in 2003 and 2004 she raced in composite selections crews who won consecutive national lightweight quad sculls championship titles.

== International representative rowing ==
Newmarch's Australian representative debut came in 1993 as a single sculler. She competed at the World Rowing Cup I in Melbourne that year and at the WRC II in Mexico City. Then at the 1993 Junior World Rowing Championships in Aarungen, Norway she was Australia's junior single sculls entrant and raced to a silver medal.

In 1994 aged nineteen she moved into the Australian senior women's quad scull. She stroked the quad at the 1994 World Rowing Championships in Indianapolis to fourth place. Newmarch and Marina Hatzakis held seats in the quad for the next three years. With Adair Ferguson and Fleur Spriggs they contested the 1995 World Rowing Championships in Tampere placing thirteenth and then with Jane Robinson and Bronwyn Roye they competed at the 1996 Atlanta Olympics finishing ninth overall.

In 1997 Newmarch competed in a single scull and won gold at the World Rowing U23 Championships in Milan. She came back into the senior quad in 1998 with Hatzakis, Robinson and Roye and after racing at the WRC III in Lucerne, they competed at the 1998 World Rowing Championships in Cologne and won a bronze medal.

In 1999 Newmarch changed down to the lightweight division where she rowed for the rest of her competitive career. She crewed the Australian senior lightweight double scull with Virginia Lee to a bronze medal at the 1999 World Rowing Championships in St Catharines, Canada. Lee and Newmarch built their 2000 Olympics campaign with appearances at two World Rowing Cups in Europe in 2000. At Sydney 2000 they placed second in their heat, won the repechage and placed third in the semi-final. In the Olympic final they finished some 6 sec outside medal contention but in overall fourth place. She took a break after Sydney 2000 but was back in national contention in 2003 and selected to row the lightweight quad at the WRC III in Lucerne and at the 2003 World Rowing Championships in Milan. At those Championships with Marguerite Houston, Bronwen Watson, and Miranda Bennett she won a bronze medal.

The 2004 Summer Olympics programme included only one lightweight women's sculling boat – the double. Newmarch was vying for selection against Houston, Bennett, Amber Halliday, Zita van de Walle, Louise Auld and Jacqui Bain. The selection competition was fierce and Newmarch and Halliday were picked. Newmarch's preparations were hampered by a cycling accident in training. She broke three ribs three months out from the Olympics and was prevented from racing in the lead-up World Cups. In Athens 2004 Halliday and Newmarch's technical proficiency in blustery conditions saw them win both their heat and semi-final convincingly and they became gold medal favourites. In their heat they set a new world record time for the LW2X – as of 2021 it still stands as an Olympic record. But the 2004 Olympic final was rowed in calm, glassy conditions and Newmarch and Halliday's disrupted fitness program showed. The Romanians rowed through them in the third 500 m and the Germans and Dutch also came over the top of the Australians. They finished in fourth place. It was Newmarch's third Olympics and final Australian representative appearance.

Newmarch set and as of 2021 still holds, the Australian ergometer record in the 19 to 29 year division for lightweights over 2000 m on a Concept2.

== Post-competitive rowing ==
Following her 2004 retirement Newmarch married former South African rower John Callie, became known as Sally Callie and embarked on a teaching career.

In 2006 Newmarch was employed at the Wilderness School in Adelaide as the rowing coordinator. In 2010 she taught at Methodist Ladies' College, Perth and was Sports Coordinator and a rowing coach. Since 2013 she has been Director of Rowing at Brisbane Girls Grammar School.

== See also ==
- Rowing at the 2004 Summer Olympics – Women's lightweight double sculls
