= Miranda Bennett =

Australian rower (born 1979)

Personal information
- Born: 1 September 1979 (age 46)
- Years active: 1993–2008

Sport
- Sport: Rowing
- Club: Torrens Rowing Club
Medal record
Women's rowing
Representing Australia
World Rowing Championships
Gold medal – first place	2002 Seville	LW4X
Gold medal – first place	2007 Munich	LW4x
Gold medal – first place	2008 Linz	LW4x
Bronze medal – third place	2003 Milan	LW4x

Miranda Bennett (born 1 September 1979 in Bordertown, South Australia) is an Australian former rower who won three World Championship titles.

== Club and state rowing ==
Bennett's senior rowing was done from the Torrens Rowing Club in Adelaide.

She contested the national lightweight double sculls title at the Australian Rowing Championships from 1999. She won that championship in 2000.

Bennett was first selected to represent South Australia in the women's Interstate Youth Eight Championship contesting the Bicentennial Cup at the 1999 Australian Rowing Championships. She then raced in South Australian representative crews who contested the Victoria Cup at the Interstate Regatta successively from 2000 to 2004 and then from 2006 to 2008. Those champion South Australian quads stroked by Amber Halliday or Marguerite Houston were victorious in this event in 2000, 2002, 2003, 2004, 2007 and 2008.

== International representative rowing ==
Bennett made her Australian representative debut at the 2000 Nations Cup in Copenhagen, Denmark, the equivalent of today's World Rowing U23 Championships. She placed fifth in a lightweight double scull with her South Australian teammate Megan Campbell

Bennett raced at both World Rowing Cups in Europe in 2001 in a double scull.

She raced at the 2002 World Rowing Cup II in Lucerne, Switzerland in the Australian lightweight quad, and crewed in the 2002 World Rowing Championships in Seville in the lightweight quad scull. The crew with Zita van de Walle, Marguerite Houston and Hannah Every-Hall won gold and set a new world record.

The following year at Milan 2003 with Bronwen Watson and Sally Newmarch Bennett stroked the boat to World Championship bronze. Bennett was selected with Watson, Alice McNamara, and Tara Kelly in the lightweight quad for the 2007 World Rowing Championships in Munich, winning gold.

Bennet, Watson, McNamara, and Ingrid Fenger competed in the 2008 World Lightweight Championships in Linz Austria. which they won in a time of 6:36.41. This was Bennett's third and last World Championship title.
