= Nick Baxter (rower) =

Australian rower (born 1979)

Personal information
- Born: Nicholas Baxter; 26 July 1979 (age 47)
- Family: Al Baxter, brother

Sport
- Sport: Rowing
- Club: Sydney Rowing Club

Achievements and titles
- National finals: King's Cup 2001–2007
Medal record
Men's rowing
Representing Australia
World Championships
Bronze medal – third place	2008 Linz	M2-
World U23 Championships
Silver medal – second place	2000 Copenhagen	M8+

Nicholas Baxter (born 26 July 1979) is an Australian former rower. He rowed in six New South Wales eights competing at Australia's King's Cup, was a national champion and a medallist at underage and senior World Championships.

== State and club rowing ==
Baxter's senior rowing was from the Sydney Rowing Club and later UTS Haberfield Rowing Club. At the 2001 Australian University Championships he rowed in a pair and a four for the UNSW Rowing Club. In 2002 he and Zac Kirkham won the coxless pairs title at the Australian Universities Championship in UNSW black and gold.

He first made state selection for New South Wales in the 1998 youth eight contesting the Noel Wilkinson Trophy at the Australian Rowing Championships. He rowed in the New South Wales youth eight again in 1999. In 2001 he was selected in the New South Wales senior eight contesting the King's Cup at the Interstate Regatta. He rowed in further King's Cup races for New South Wales in 2002, 2004, 2005, 2006 and 2007 and rowed to a King's Cup victory in 2004.

== International representative rowing ==
Baxter made his Australian representative debut in 2000 in an U23 men's eight who raced at the World Rowing Cup III in Lucerne before contesting the 2000 World Rowing U23 Championships at Copenhagen where they took the silver medal. In 2001 he raced in the senior men's eight at a World Rowing Cup and then at the 2001 World Rowing Championships in Lucerne to a seventh placing. For the 2003 World Rowing Championships, selectors first chose the Australian eight and then picked Baxter in a coxless four of New South Welshmen selected to be able to train together locally. With James Chapman, Stuart Welch and Stephen Stewart he rowed to a fourth placing in Milan.

In 2004, he raced in a coxless pair with Chapman at the 2004 World Rowing Cup. They placed eleventh and he did not compete at World Championships that year or again until 2007 when he was selected to the Australian coxless four. That four raced at two World Rowing Cups in Europe before contesting the 2007 World Rowing Championships. They missed the A final and finished last in the B final for an overall twelfth placing.

Baxter's final Australian representative appearance was in a coxed pair at Linz 2008 rowed to a bronze medal with Fergus Pragnell and steered by Hugh Rawlinson. The pair through came from a long way back in the field. They were in fifth position after the first quarter of the race and could not improve on this over the next 1000 metres. Heading into the final stages of the race Pragnell and Baxter kicked and passed the Italian and Polish crews. Poland had been leading the whole race but fatigued badly to finish fifth. Australia could not catch Canada or France and finished in a time of 7:09.30, roughly a boat and a half behind gold medallists France.
