= Jochen Kühner =

German rower (born 1980)

Medal record

Men's rowing

Representing Germany

World Rowing Championships
Gold medal – first place	2009 Poznań	LM4-
Gold medal – first place	2010 Karapiro	LM8+
Gold medal – first place	2012 Plovdiv	LM8+
Silver medal – second place	2007 Munich	LM2-

Jochen Kühner (born 15 October 1980 in Speyer) is a German rower. At the 2008 and 2012 Summer Olympics, he competed in the men's lightweight four. He has also been world champion in this event, along with his brother Martin Kühner, Jost Schömann-Finck, and Matthias Schömann-Finck. He has also been world champion in the men's lightweight eight, and runner up in the men's lightweight pair, again with his brother.

== Competitions ==
- 2008 Summer Olympics – Men's lightweight coxless four
- 2012 Summer Olympics – Men's lightweight coxless four
- 2007 World Rowing Championships – LM2- – 2nd place (silver medal)
- 2009 World Rowing Championships – LM4- – 1st place (gold medal)
- 2010 World Rowing Championships – LM8+ – 1st place (gold medal)
- 2012 World Rowing Championships – LM8+ – 1st place (gold medal)
- 2009 European Rowing Championships – LM4- – 2nd place (silver medal)
- 2010 European Rowing Championships – LM4- – 1st place (gold medal)

== See also ==
- Germany at the 2008 Summer Olympics
- Germany at the 2012 Summer Olympics
