= Jérémie Azou =

French rower (born 1989)

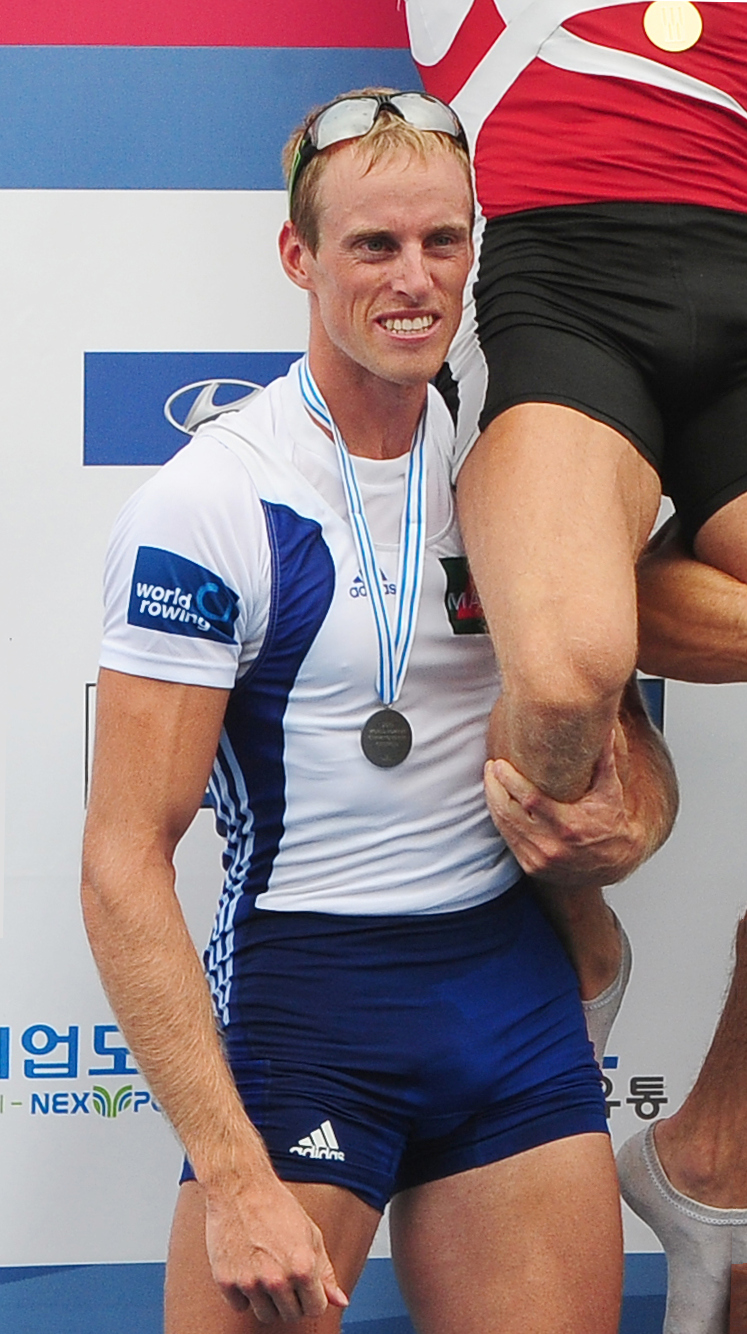
- Azou at the 2013 World Championships

Personal information
- Born: 2 April 1989 (age 37) Avignon, France
- Height: 178 cm (5 ft 10 in)
- Weight: 71 kg (157 lb)

Sport
- Sport: Lightweight rowing
Medal record
Men's rowing
Representing France
Olympic Games
Gold medal – first place	2016 Rio de Janeiro	Lwt double sculls
World Championships
Gold medal – first place	2015 Aiguebelette	Lwt double sculls
Gold medal – first place	2017 Sarasota	Lwt double sculls
Silver medal – second place	2008 Linz	Lwt quad sculls
Silver medal – second place	2009 Poznań	Lwt double sculls
Silver medal – second place	2013 Chungju	Lwt single sculls
Silver medal – second place	2014 Amsterdam	Lwt double sculls
European Championships
Gold medal – first place	2013 Seville	Lwt double sculls
Gold medal – first place	2014 Belgrade	Lwt double sculls
Gold medal – first place	2015 Poznań	Lwt double sculls
Gold medal – first place	2017 Račice	Lwt double sculls
Bronze medal – third place	2010 Montemor-o-Velho	Lwt double sculls

Jérémie Azou (born 2 April 1989) is a French former rower. He is an Olympic, World, and European champion in the men's lightweight double sculls.

== Career ==
He was part of the French men's lightweight quadruple sculls team who won silver at the 2008 World Championships, with Pierre-Etienne Pollez, Fabrice Moreau and Remi Di Girolamo.

In 2009, he won silver at the World Championships in the men's lightweight double sculls with Frederic Dufour. In 2010, he teamed with Di Girolamo to win bronze at the European Championships.

At the 2011 World Under 23 championships, he competed in the lightweight men's single sculls, winning the gold medal.

In 2012, he began to team with Stany Delayre. They finished in 4th in the lightweight double sculls at the 2012 Summer Olympics. An injury to Delayre meant that Azou competed in the lightweight single sculls at the 2013 World Championship, where he won the silver medal.

Their team won the European Championships in 2013, 2014 and 2015 and the World Championships in 2015. They also won a World silver medal in 2014. The time of 06:11.38 Azou and Delayre set at the 2015 European Championships is still the fastest time at a European championships. They also hold the fastest time at a World Cup.

In 2015, Azou and Delayre won the World Rowing Male Crew of the Year Award.

He teamed with Pierre Houin from 2016, winning Olympic gold at the Rio Olympics, and then the 2017 World Championship title.

He was undefeated in the men's lightweight double sculls from 2015 to October 2017. He retired in October 2017, announcing his retirement at a celebration of the renaming of the Avignon Rowing Club to Avignon Rowing Club: Base Nautique Jeremie Azou.

== Personal life ==
Azou originally swam as a hobby before taking up rowing at 12. He is a trained physiotherapist.
