= Ingrid Fenger =

Australian rower

Personal information
- Born: 26 June 1985 (age 41)
- Years active: 1997-2010

Sport
- Sport: Rowing
- Club: Tamar Rowing Club
Medal record
Women's rowing
Representing Australia
World Rowing Championships
| Gold medal – first place | 2008 Linz | LW4x |

Ingrid Fenger (born 26 June 1985) is an Australian former representative lightweight rower. She was twice a national champion and a 2008 world champion.

== Club and state rowing ==
Born in Tasmania, Fenger's senior rowing was done from the Tamar Rowing Club in Launceston.

From 2008 to 2010 Fenger rowed in Tasmanian state representative crews contesting the Victoria Cup in the women's lightweight quad scull at the Interstate Regatta within the Australian Rowing Championships. She won that title in 2009 and 2010, stroking the crew in 2009. In Tamar Rowing Club colours she contested national titles at the Australian Rowing Championships. She raced in the lightweight double scull and in the lightweight quad scull in 2008.

== International representative rowing ==
Fenger first represented Australia at the 2007 World Rowing U23 Championships in Glasgow. In a double scull with Carly Cottam she placed tenth.

Fenger was elevated to the senior Australian women's lightweight quad who'd won a 2007 World Championship title. She replaced Tara Kelly in the boat and came into the bow seat to share in their thrilling 2008 World Championship victory in Austria. At the 500 m mark the Australians sat in fourth place behind Poland, the United States and Great Britain. They lifted their rate in the middle half and moved ahead of the American and British crews and turned their attention to chasing down the Poles who held a one and a half second lead at the halfway mark. In the final 500 m Australia surged past Poland and stormed to the line to take the gold medal in a time of 6:36.41, almost three seconds clear of Poland. It was Fenger's sole senior World Championship appearance and title.
