= Matt Muffelman =

American rower

Personal information
- Born: November 22, 1980 (age 45)

Sport
- Sport: Rowing
Medal record
Men's rowing
Representing United States
World Rowing Championships
Gold medal – first place	2008 Ottensheim	Lwt eight
Silver medal – second place	2009 Poznań	Lwt eight

Matt Muffelman (born November 22, 1980) is an American lightweight rower. He won a gold medal at the 2008 World Rowing Championships in Ottensheim with the lightweight men's eight.
