= Hugh Rawlinson =

Australian rowing cox

Sport
- Sport: Rowing
Medal record
Men's rowing
Representing Australia
World Rowing Championships
Bronze medal – third place	2008 Linz	M2+

Hugh Rawlinson is an Australian rowing coxswain. He coxed Western Australian eights competing at Australia's King's Cup and was a medallist at senior World Championships.

== State and club rowing ==
He first made state selection for Western Australia in the 2006 senior eight contesting the King's Cup at the Interstate Regatta within the Australian Rowing Championships. He coxed the Western Australian eight in three consecutive King's Cup races from 2006 to 2008. The crew finished second in 2006 and third in 2007 and 2008.

== International representative rowing ==
Rawlinson made his Australian representative debut in 2008 at the World Championships which being an Olympic year contested only lightweight and non-Olympic heavyweight events. Rawlinson steered an Australian coxed pair at Linz 2008 to a bronze medal rowed by Nick Baxter and Fergus Pragnell. The crew was fifth after the first 500 metres and still fifth with 500 metres to go. In the closing stage Pragnell and Baxter passed Italy and Poland; the Polish crew had led until then and faded to fifth. Australia finished third in 7:09.30, behind Canada (7:06.69) and France (7:08.64).
