= Felix Otto =

Felix Otto may refer to:

- Felix Otto (mathematician) (born 1966), German mathematician
- Felix Otto (rower) (born 1983), German rower
