= Marguerite Houston =

Australian rower

Personal information
- Born: 11 July 1981 (age 44)
- Years active: 2000–08

Sport
- Sport: Rowing
- Club: Toowong Rowing Club; Adelaide University Boat Club.
Medal record
Women's rowing
Representing Australia
World Rowing Championships
| Gold medal – first place | 2002 | Lightweight quad-scull |
| Gold medal – first place | 2007 | Lightweight double-scull |
| Silver medal – second place | 2006 | Lightweight double-scull |
| Bronze medal – third place | 2003 | Lightweight quad-scull |

Marguerite Houston (born 11 July 1981) is an Australian former lightweight rower. She is an Australian national champion, an Olympian and two-time World Champion. She contested state representative events (firstly for Queensland and later for South Australia) at nine successive Australian Rowing Championships.

== Club and state rowing ==
Houston was born in Queensland. Her senior rowing was done from the Toowong Rowing Club in Brisbane, the University of Queensland Boat Club (UQBC) and later when she relocated to South Australia from the Adelaide University Boat Club.

Houston began contesting Australian national lightweight sculling events at the Australian Championships in 2001 initially for Toowong. In 2004 in UQBC colours she won the national title in a double scull. She achieved the national triple in 2005 wearing Adelaide Uni colours winning the single sculls title and at stroke in both the double scull and the quad scull. She repeated the twosome in 2006 and 2007 (the double and quad) with Amber Halliday in the stroke seat. In 2008 Houston won another national title in the lightweight quad.

Houston was first selected to represent Queensland in the women's Interstate Youth Eight Championship contesting the Bicentennial Cup at the 2000 Australian Rowing Championships. From 2001 Houston raced in Queensland representative lightweight women's crews who contested the Victoria Cup at the Interstate Regatta. She rowed in those quad sculls successively from 2001 to 2006; at stroke for the last three of those events.

By 2007 Houston had relocated to South Australia to train with and aim for world championship success with Amber Halliday. In 2007 she was selected in the South Australian women's lightweight quad and at that year's Australian Championships she saw her first Victoria Cup victory at the Interstate Regatta rowing in the two seat behind Halliday. In 2008 she stroked the South Australian quad to victory in that same event.

Notably, from 2005 to 2008 Houston contested all four events available to a female lightweight sculler at the Australian Rowing Championships – the single, the double, the quad national title and the quad interstate championship. She was victorious in ten of those sixteen races and twice placed second.

== International representative rowing ==
Houston made her first Australian representative appearance at the 2002 World Rowing Cup II in Lucerne, Switzerland. That year she was picked in the lightweight quad scull to contest the 2002 World Rowing Championships in Seville. In a crew with Zita van de Walle, Miranda Bennett and Hannah Every-Hall, Houston won the gold, her first World Championship title and set a new world record in the process.

At Milan 2003 Houston again raced in the Australian lightweight quad. They won the bronze medal.

Australia qualified a lightweight double scull for the Athens Olympics in 2004 being Sally Newmarch and Amber Halliday. There is no lightweight quad raced at the Olympics and Houston missed selection in Australia's boat for the lightweight 2004 World Rowing Championships. Her 2004 international rowing was therefore restricted to that year's World Rowing Cup III at Lucerne where she placed eight in the double-scull with Sally Newmarch. For the 2005 World Rowing Championships at Gifu, Japan Houston raced for Australia in the lightweight double scull with Kirsty Fleming. They placed sixth.

Still in the lightweight double-scull for the 2006 World Rowing Championships in Eton, Dorney but now paired with Halliday, Houston had greater success as they won the silver. They stayed together in that same boat the following year for Munich 2007 where Houston and Halliday won the gold bringing Marguerite's second and Amber's third world championship title.
