= Ole Rückbrodt =

German rower (born 1983)

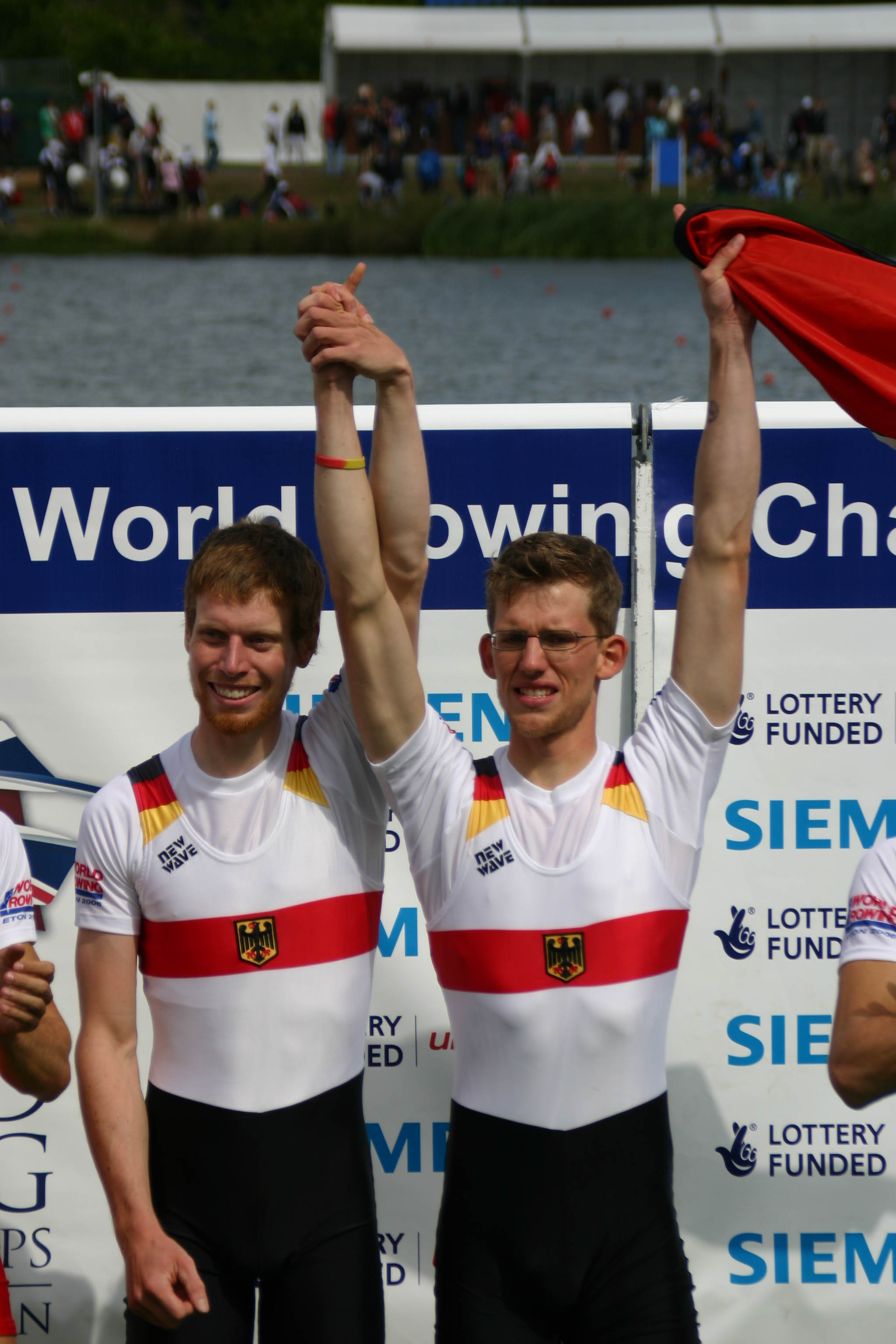
- Ole Rückbrodt (left) and Felix Otto (right) in 2006

Medal record

Men's rowing

Representing Germany

World Rowing Championships
Gold medal – first place	2006 Eton	LM2-
Silver medal – second place	2007 Munich	LM8+

Ole Rückbrodt (born 17 May 1983 in Lübeck) is a German rower. He won the gold medal in the men's lightweight coxless pair at the 2006 World Rowing Championships.
