= Sickler =

Sickler is a surname. It may refer to:

- Brett Sickler (born 1983), American rower
- Don Sickler (born 1944), American jazz trumpeter, arranger, and producer
- George Sickler (1891–1964), South African cricket umpire
