= Stany Delayre =

French rower (born 1987)

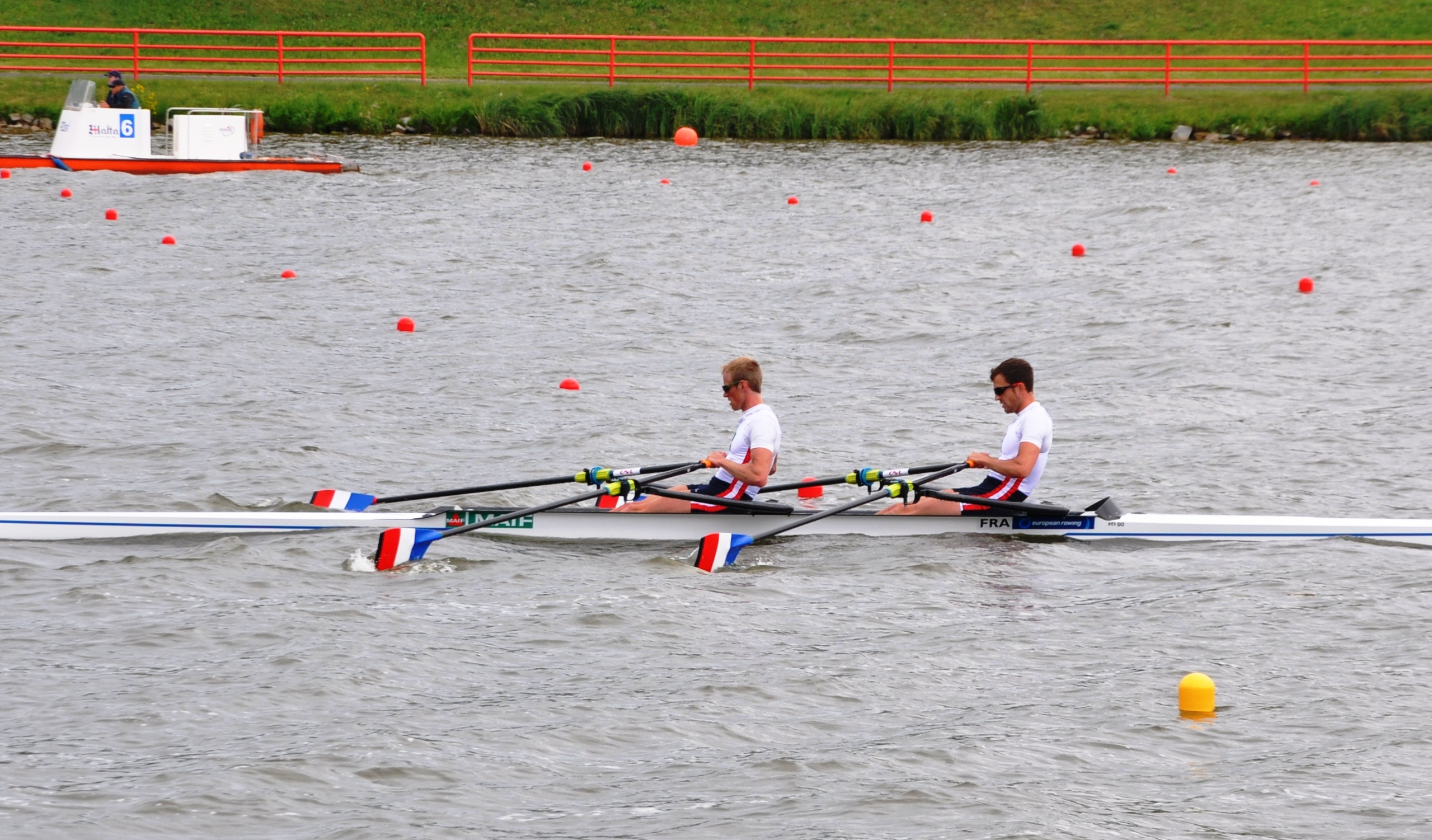
- Delayre and Jérémie Azou in 2015

Medal record

Men's rowing

Representing France

World Championships
Gold medal – first place	2015 Aiguebelette	LM2x
Gold medal – first place	2017 Sarasota	LM4x
Silver medal – second place	2010 Karapiro	LM4x
Silver medal – second place	2014 Amsterdam	LM2x

European Championships
Gold medal – first place	2014 Belgrade	LM2x

Stany Delayre (born 26 October 1987 in Bergerac) is a French rower. At the 2012 Summer Olympics, he competed with Jérémie Azou in the men's lightweight double sculls, finishing in 4th place. On home water, he and Azou won the 2015 World Championship in that event. Their team also won the silver medal at the 2014 World Championships, and won the 2013, 2014 and 2015 European Championships. In 2009, Delayre was part of the French men's lightweight quadruple sculls time at the World Championships. He was also part of the French under-23s men's lightweight quadruple sculls at the 2006 and 2007 Junior World Rowing Championships.

Delayre was not picked for the French team at the 2016 Olympics, after he was beaten by the younger rower Pierre Houin in the individual sculls at the French national trials.
