= Beemsterboer =

Beemsterboer is a surname of Dutch origin.

== People with the surname ==
- Dennis Beemsterboer (born 1982), Dutch rower
- Marieke Vellinga-Beemsterboer (born 1986), Dutch politician

== See also ==
- Beemster
- Boer
