= Baz Moffat =

British rower

Baz Moffat (born 1978) is a British rower.

Baz Moffat graduated from the University of Birmingham with a first class honours degree (BSc Sport Science). She studied between 1996 and 1999. She received an MSc in health sciences from Bristol University, in 2002.

Moffat won Silver in the 2008 World Rowing Cup and Bronze in the 2006 World Rowing Cup. Moffat won a bronze medal in the 2007 World Rowing Championships at Munich in Germany. Moffat was 11th in the 2006 World Rowing Championships at Dorney Lake, Eton, in England. She currently runs her own personal training company in London. She is a Women's Health and Fitness and specialises in pelvic floor and core strength. Www.bazmoffat.com
