= Knud Lange =

German rower (born 1984)

Medal record

Men's rowing

Representing Germany

World Rowing Championships
Silver medal – second place	2006 Eton	LM4x
Silver medal – second place	2009 Poznań	LM4x
Bronze medal – third place	2008 Linz	LM4x

Knud Lange (born 9 May 1984 in Bremerhaven) is a German rower.

Lange study on the University of Bremen. He rowing for the Bremerhavener Ruderverein in Lightweight rowing Quad scull for Germany. He wins some World championship-Medals:

- WC 2006, Dorney Lake by Eton (UK): Silver-Medal with Kai Anspach, Martin Rückbrodt, Knud Lange, Christoph Schregel.
- WC 2007, Olympia-Oberschleißheim Regatta Course by Munich: Place four
- WC 2008, in Linz/Ottensheim: Bronze-Medal with Stephan Schad, Knud Lange, Felix Övermann and Michael Wieler.
- WC 2009, on the Malta lake in Poznań in Poland: Silver-Medal with Knud Lange, Lars Wichert, Felix Övermann and Michael Wieler.

He wins 2011 the Gold-Medal by the Students European Rowing Championships 2011 in Moscow.

He was Bremen Sportspersonality of the Year in 2006, 2007 and 2008.
