= Katherine Glessner =

American rower

Personal information
- Born: March 11, 1986 (age 40)
Medal record
Women's rowing
Representing the United States
World Championships
Gold medal – first place	2009 Poznan	Eight

Katherine Glessner (born March 11, 1986) is an American rower. She competed in the 2009 and 2010 World Rowing Championships in the women's eight event and won gold medals in each event. In 2013 she was inducted into the Northeastern Athletics Hall of Fame, and the following year joined the women's Northeastern University rowing team as an assistant coach.
