= Duncan Grant (rower) =

New Zealand rower

Personal information
- Born: 7 February 1980 (age 46) Ashburton, New Zealand
- Education: Christ's College, University of Waikato
- Height: 187 cm (6 ft 2 in)
- Weight: 68 kg (150 lb)
Medal record
Representing New Zealand
Men's rowing
Gold medal – first place	2007 Munich	LM1x
Gold medal – first place	2008 Ottensheim	LM1x
Gold medal – first place	2009 Poznań	LM1x
Bronze medal – third place	2006 Eton	LM1x
Bronze medal – third place	2011 Lake Bled	LM1x

Duncan Grant (born 7 February 1980) is a New Zealand rower.

Grant was born in Ashburton in 1980. Throughout his rowing career, he has competed in the lightweight men's single sculls category. At the 2006 World Rowing Championships in Eton, he won a bronze medal. He was lightweight men's single sculls world champion on three occasions: at the championships in 2007 in Munich, in 2008 in Ottensheim, and in 2009 in Poznań. When the world championships were held in his home town at Lake Karapiro in 2010, he missed the A-final and came first in the B-final. At the 2011 World Rowing Championships at Lake Bled, he won a bronze medal.

In February 2011, Peter Taylor became New Zealand national champion in lightweight men's single sculls, beating Grant in an upset win.

He was a mathematics teacher at Auckland Grammar School from May 2018 to December 2018.
