= Philipp Naruhn =

German rower (born 1983)

Medal record

Men's rowing

Representing Germany

World Rowing Championships
Gold medal – first place	2006 Eton	M4+
Bronze medal – third place	2007 Munich	M4+
Bronze medal – third place	2009 Poznań	M2+

Philipp Naruhn (born 14 July 1983 in Schwerin) is a German rower.
