= Ryan T. Fox =

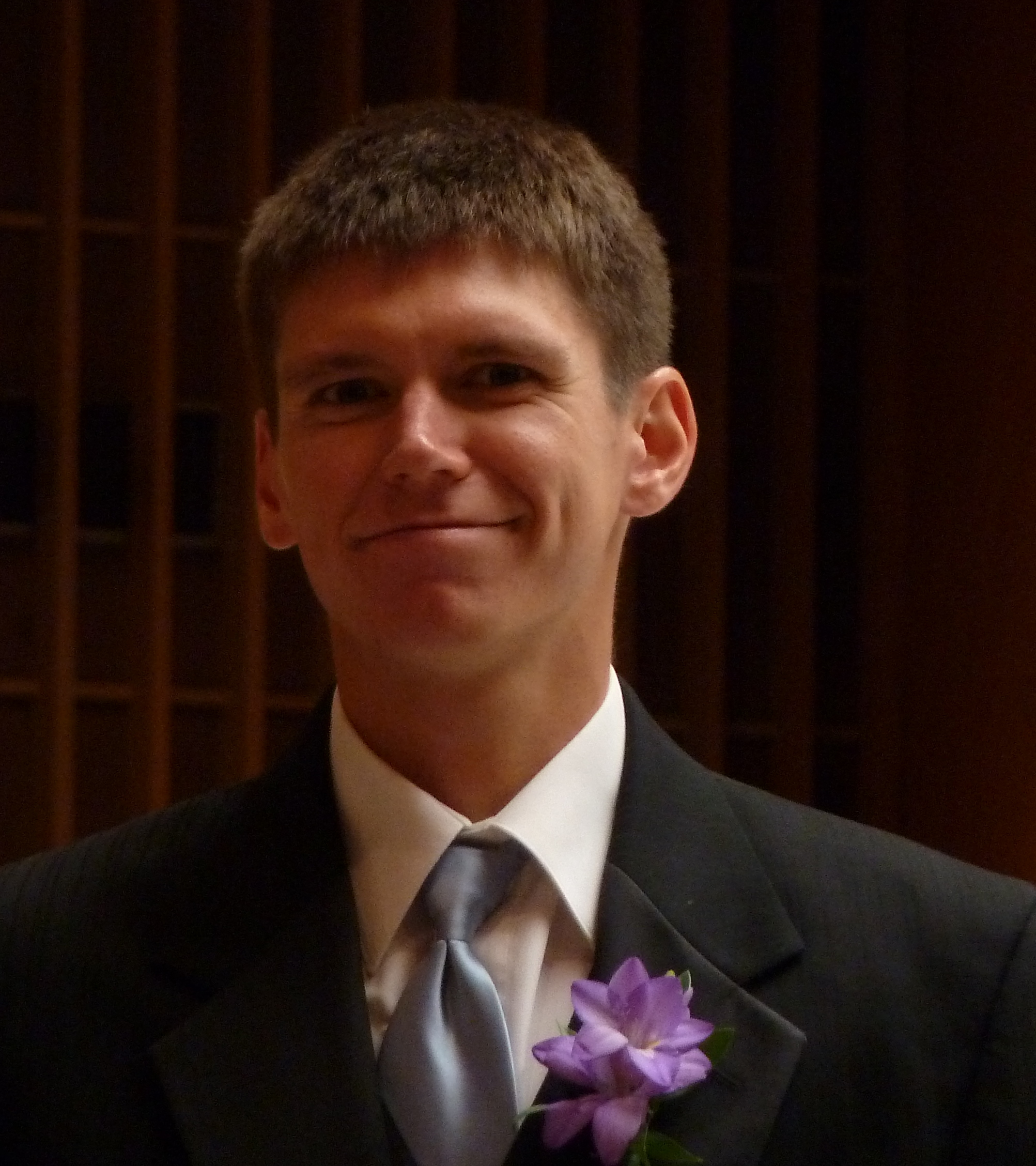

Personal information
- Born: October 7, 1986 (age 40) Edgerton, Wisconsin, United States
- Height: 6 ft 3 in (1.91 m)
- Weight: 160 lb (73 kg)

Sport
- Sport: Rowing
Medal record
Representing United States
Men's Rowing
Silver medal – second place	2009 Poland	Eights

Ryan T. Fox (born October 7, 1986) is an American rowing athlete with the United States Rowing team.

== Career ==
Fox was part of the silver medal winning team at the 2009 World Rowing Championships in Poznan, Poland. Fox also was part of the 2010 National Team that competed valiantly at the 2010 World Rowing Championships at Lake Karapiro, New Zealand . He competed in the 2012 World Rowing Championships at Plovdiv, Bulgaria.

Fox was employed by Oklahoma Medical Research Foundation as a programming consultant, writing programming to help with a project tracking rheumatoid arthritis patients’ data. He currently works at Very Large Array in New Mexico.
