= Mara Allen =

American rower (born 1987)

Personal information
- Born: February 11, 1987 (age 39)
Medal record
Women's rowing
Representing the United States
World Championships
Gold medal – first place	2009 Poznan	W8+
Bronze medal – third place	2010 Karapiro	W4-

Mara Allen (born February 11, 1987) is an American rower. In the 2009 World Rowing Championships, she won a gold medal in the women's eight event.

In the 2010 World Rowing Championships, she also won a bronze medal in the women's four event.
