= Andrea Caianiello =

Italian rower

Personal information
- Born: 24 September 1987 (age 38) Naples, Italy

Sport
- Sport: Rowing
- Club: Fiamme Oro
Medal record
World Rowing Championships
Gold medal – first place	2007 Munich	LM2-
Silver medal – second place	2008 Linz	LM2-
Silver medal – second place	2009 Poznań	LM2-
Silver medal – second place	2011 Lake Bled	LM4-
Silver medal – second place	2012 Plovdiv	LM8+
Bronze medal – third place	2006 Eton	LM2-

Andrea Caianiello (born 24 September 1987) is an Italian rower.

== Biography ==
He was part of the Italian men's lightweight coxless four team at the 2012 Summer Olympics.
