= Gennaro Gallo =

Italian rower

Personal information
- Born: 8 January 1984 (age 42)

Sport
- Sport: Rowing
Medal record
Men's rowing
Representing Italy
World Rowing Championships
Gold medal – first place	2009 Poznań	Lwt eight
Bronze medal – third place	2010 Karapiro	Lwt eight

Gennaro Gallo (born 8 January 1984) is an Italian lightweight rower. He won a gold medal at the 2009 World Rowing Championships in Poznań with the lightweight men's eight.
