= 2008 World Rowing Championships =

International rowing event

- Location: Ottensheim near Linz, Austria
- Dates: 22 to 27 July

The 2008 World Rowing Championships were World Rowing Championships that were held from 22 to 27 July 2008 in conjunction with the World Junior Rowing Championships in Ottensheim near Linz, Austria. Since 2008 was an Olympic year for rowing, the World Championships did not include Olympic events scheduled for the 2008 Summer Olympics, or the adaptive rowing events at the 2008 Summer Paralympics.

== Medal summary ==
=== Men's events ===
Event:	Gold:	Time	Silver:	Time	Bronze:	Time
M2+	Canada; Gabriel Bergen (b); James Dunaway (s); Mark Laidlaw (c)	7:06.69	France; Sébastien Lente (b); Benjamin Lang (s); Benjamin Manceau (c)	7:08.64	Australia; Nick Baxter (b); Fergus Pragnell (s); Hugh Rawlinson (c)	7:09.30
Men's lightweight events
LM1x	New Zealand; Duncan Grant	6:52.38	Netherlands; Jaap Schouten	6:52.73	Greece; Ilias Pappas	6:55.00
LM2-	Greece; Nikolaos Goudoulas (b); Apostolos Goudoulas (s)	6:40.92	Italy; Andrea Caianiello (b); Armando Dell'Aquila(s)	6:42.88	Serbia; Goran Nedeljković (b); Miloš Tomić (s)	6:45.25
LM4x	Italy; Franco Sancassani (b); Daniele Gilardoni (2); Stefano Basalini (3); Daniele Danesin (s)	5:57.30	France; Rémi Di Girolamo (b); Jérémie Azou (2); Fabrice Moreau (3); Pierre-Étienne Pollez (s)	5:57.56	Germany; Stephan Schad (b); Knud Lange (2); Felix Övermann (3); Michael Wieler (s)	5:59.50
LM8+	United States; Simon Carcagno (b); Andrew Bolton (2); Colin Farrell (3); Mike Altman (4); Pat Todd (5); Will Daly (6); Tom Paradiso (7); Matt Muffelman (s); Edmund del Guercio (c)	5:50.29	Germany; Matthias Veit (b); Marc Rippel (2); Johann-Sebastian Diemann (3); Jonas Schützeberg (4); Matthias Schömann-Finck (5); Adrian Bretting (6); Olaf Beckmann (7); Axel Schuster (s); Martin Sauer (c)	5:51.69	Netherlands; Pieter Rom Colthoff (b); Diederick van den Bouwhuijsen (2); Reinoud de Groot (3); Dennis Beemsterboer (4); Rutger Bruil (5); Jolmer van der Sluis (6); Maarten Tromp (7); Maarten de Boer (s); Ryan den Drijver (c)	5:52.37

=== Women's events ===
Event:	Gold:	Time	Silver:	Time	Bronze:	Time
W4-	Belarus; Hanna Nakhayeva (b); Volha Shcharbachenia (2); Natallia Helakh (3); Yuliya Bichyk (s)	6:39.89	United States; Karen Colwell (b); Stesha Carle (2); Sarah Trowbridge (3); Esther Lofgren (s)	6:43.56	Denmark; Maria Pertl (b); Lisbet Jakobsen (2); Fie Graugaard (3); Lea Jakobsen (s)	6:44.69
Women's lightweight events
LW1x	Switzerland; Pamela Weisshaupt	7:43.26	Ireland; Sinéad Jennings	7:43.81	Croatia; Mirna Rajle Brodanac	7:47.15
LW4x	Australia; Ingrid Fenger (b); Bronwen Watson (2); Miranda Bennett (3); Alice McNamara (s)	6:36.41	Poland; Monika Myszk (s); Magdalena Kemnitz (2); Weronika Deresz (3); Ilona Mokronowska (s)	6:39.38	United States; Elizabeth Peters (b); Wendy Tripician (2); Rebecca Smith (3); Hannah Moore (s)	6:40.77

== Medal table ==
* Host nation (Austria)

Rank	Nation	Gold	Silver	Bronze	Total
1	United States (USA)	1	1	1	3
2	Italy (ITA)	1	1	0	2
3	Australia (AUS)	1	0	1	2
3	Greece (GRE)	1	0	1	2
5	Belarus (BLR)	1	0	0	1
5	Canada (CAN)	1	0	0	1
5	New Zealand (NZL)	1	0	0	1
5	Switzerland (SUI)	1	0	0	1
9	France (FRA)	0	2	0	2
10	Germany (GER)	0	1	1	2
10	Netherlands (NED)	0	1	1	2
12	Ireland (IRL)	0	1	0	1
12	Poland (POL)	0	1	0	1
14	Croatia (CRO)	0	0	1	1
14	Denmark (DEN)	0	0	1	1
14	Serbia (SER)	0	0	1	1
Totals (16 entries)		8	8	8	24
