= Michael Wieler =

German rower (born 1981)

Medal record

Men's rowing

Representing Germany

World Rowing Championships
Silver medal – second place	2009 Poznań	LM4x
Silver medal – second place	2011 Bled	LM4x
Bronze medal – third place	2008 Linz	LM4x

Michael Wieler (born 7 February 1981, in Wetzlar) is a German rower.
