= Felix Övermann =

German rower (born 1985)

Medal record

Men's rowing

Representing Germany

World Rowing Championships
Silver medal – second place	2009 Poznań	LM4x
Bronze medal – third place	2008 Linz	LM4x

Felix Övermann (born 23 March 1985 in Osnabrück) is a German rower.
