= Edmund del Guercio =

American rower (born 1983)

Personal information
- Nickname: Ned
- Born: March 9, 1983 (age 43)

Sport
- Sport: Rowing
- Club: USRowing Princeton Training Center
Medal record
Men's rowing
Representing United States
World Championships
Gold medal – first place	2007 Munich	Coxed four
Gold medal – first place	2008 Ottensheim	Lwt eight
Pan American Games
Gold medal – first place	2007 Rio de Janeiro	Eight

Edmund "Ned" DelGuercio (born March 9, 1983) is an American coxswain. He won the gold medal at the 2008 World Rowing Championships in Ottensheim in the Men's Lightweight eight.

He won the gold medal at the 2007 World Rowing Championships in Munich with the United States Men's Coxed Four, and the gold medal at the Pan American Games in Rio de Janeiro in the Men's Eight that same year.

DelGuercio was on six USA World Championship Teams (2001, 2007, 2008, 2009, 2010, 2011), two Lucerne World Cup teams (2010, 2011), three Henley Royal Regatta teams as a competitor (2005, 2010, 2011), and two as a coach for Yale University (2016, 2022). Invited to two Olympic Selection camps (2008, 2012).

Started rowing in 1997 at Saint Joseph's Prep and the Pennsylvania Athletics Club.
