= Andrea Lenzi =

Italian rower

Personal information
- Born: 29 June 1988 (age 38)

Sport
- Sport: Rowing
Medal record
Men's rowing
Representing Italy
World Rowing Championships
Gold medal – first place	2006 Dorney	Lwt eight
Gold medal – first place	2009 Poznań	Lwt eight
Silver medal – second place	2010 Karapiro	Coxed pair
Silver medal – second place	2010 Karapiro	IDMix4+
Bronze medal – third place	2007 Munich	Lwt eight

Andrea Lenzi (born 29 June 1988) is an Italian coxswain. He won a gold medal at the 2006 World Rowing Championships in Dorney with the lightweight men's eight.
