= Samuel Burns =

American rower (born 1982)

Samuel Burns (born February 24, 1982, Seattle, Washington) is a rower. He graduated from the University of Washington in 2005 where he started rowing in 2000. While on the crew team at the University of Washington Samuel was in boats that won the National Championship and three Pac-10 Championships. After college Samuel trained with the United States National Rowing Team. He won a bronze medal in the pair at the Under-23 World Rowing Championships in Genoa, Italy and a gold medal in the coxed four at the 2007 World Rowing Championships in Munich, Germany. He is currently an officer in the United States Army and a resident physician in orthopedic surgery at Madigan Army Medical Center. He graduated from the Uniformed Services University of the Health Sciences in 2015.
