= Fan Xuefei =

Chinese rower

Fan Xuefei (born 9 October 1990) is a Chinese lightweight rower.

At the 2006 World Rowing Championships at Dorney Lake, Eton, Great Britain, she won a gold medal in the lightweight women's quadruple sculls.
