= Emiliano Ceccatelli =

Italian rower

Personal information
- Born: 5 December 1978 (age 47)

Sport
- Sport: Rowing
Medal record
Men's rowing
Representing Italy
World Rowing Championships
Gold medal – first place	2009 Poznań	Lwt eight

Emiliano Ceccatelli (born 5 December 1978) is an Italian lightweight rower. He won a gold medal at the 2009 World Rowing Championships in Poznań with the lightweight men's eight.
