= Karsten Brodowski =

German rower

Medal record

Men's rowing

Representing Germany

World Rowing Championships
Bronze medal – third place	2007 Munich	M4x
Bronze medal – third place	2009 Poznań	M4x

Karsten Brodowski (born 22 June 1985 in Neuruppin) is a German rower.
