= Rachel Jeffers =

American rower (born 1985)

Rachel Jeffers (born April 20, 1985) is an American rower. In the 2007 World Rowing Championships, she won a gold medal in the women's coxless four event. She also won a bronze medal at the 2006 World Rowing Championships in the same event.

== See also ==
Rachel Jeffers at World Rowing
