= Zita van de Walle =

Australian rower

Personal information
- Born: 8 February 1973 (age 53)

Sport
- Sport: Rowing
- Club: Sydney Uni Women's Rowing Club
Medal record
Women's rowing
Representing Australia
World Rowing Championships
Gold medal – first place	2002 Seville	Lwt quad scull

Zita van de Walle (later Briones, born 8 February 1973) is an Australian former representative rower – a national champion and a 2002 world champion.

== Club and state rowing ==
Born in Sydney, van de Walle's senior rowing was done from the Sydney University Women's Rowing Club.

van de Walle raced in New South Wales representative women's crews who contested the Victoria Cup at the Interstate Regatta from 2001 to 2004. She won New South Wales state championships in 2004 in the single and double.

== International representative rowing ==
She made her first Australian senior representative appearance in the lightweight quad at the 2002 World Rowing Championships in Seville, Spain. With Marguerite Houston, Miranda Bennett and Hannah Every-Hall she rowed to a gold medal, a World Championship title and a new world record time. It was Australia's second successive World Championship win in this boat class.

van de Walle was Australia's lightweight single sculls entrant to the 2002 World Rowing Championships in Milan. She placed fourteenth For the lightweight only World Championships in 2004 (being an Olympic year), Australia selected a development squad for the next Olympiad. van der Walle made the quad scull which placed seventh. It was her last international outing in Australian colours.

== Personal ==
Zita is married to the Spanish rowing coach Gonzalo Briones. She has coached Sydney Uni women's crews as Zita Briones and is an accountant.
