= Pieter Bottema =

Dutch rower

Personal information
- Born: 13 December 1978 (age 47)

Sport
- Sport: Rowing
Medal record
Men's rowing
Representing the Netherlands
World Rowing Championships
Gold medal – first place	2007 Munich	Lwt eight

Pieter Bottema (born 13 December 1978) is a Dutch lightweight rower. He won a gold medal at the 2007 World Rowing Championships in Munich with the lightweight men's eight.
