= Maarten Tromp (rower) =

Dutch rower (born 1983)

Personal information
- Born: 26 July 1983 (age 42)

Sport
- Sport: Rowing
Medal record
Men's rowing
Representing the Netherlands
World Rowing Championships
Gold medal – first place	2007 Munich	Lwt eight
Bronze medal – third place	2008 Ottensheim	Lwt eight
Bronze medal – third place	2009 Poznań	Lwt eight

Maarten Tromp (born 26 July 1983) is a Dutch lightweight rower. He won a gold medal at the 2007 World Rowing Championships in Munich with the lightweight men's eight.
