= Stefano Basalini =

Italian rower (born 1977)

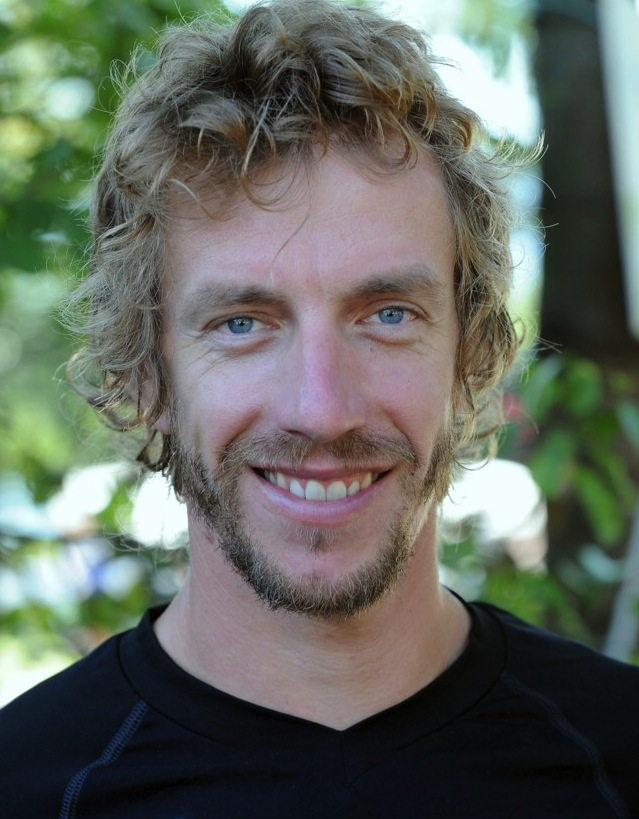
- Stefano Basalini

Personal information
- Born: 29 November 1977 (age 48) Borgomanero, Italy
Medal record
Men's rowing
Representing Italy
World Championships
Gold medal – first place	1997 Aiguebelette	LM4x
Gold medal – first place	1998 Cologne	LM1x
Gold medal – first place	1999 St. Catharines	LM2-
Gold medal – first place	2003 Milan	LM1x
Gold medal – first place	2008 Linz	LM4x
Gold medal – first place	2009 Poznań	LM4x
Gold medal – first place	2011 Bled	LM4x
Silver medal – second place	2001 Lucerne	LM1x
Silver medal – second place	2002 Seville	LM1x

Stefano Basalini (born 29 November 1977 in Borgomanero) is an Italian rower.
