= 2006 World Rowing Championships =

International rowing event

- Venue: Dorney Lake
- Location: Dorney, Great Britain
- Dates: 20 to 27 August

The 2006 World Rowing Championships were World Rowing Championships that were held from 20 to 27 August 2006 at Dorney Lake in Dorney, Buckinghamshire, England, United Kingdom.

== Medal summary ==
=== Men ===
Non-Olympic classes

Event	Gold	Time	Silver	Time	Bronze	Time
M1x	New Zealand; Mahé Drysdale	6:35.40	Germany; Marcel Hacker	6:35.49	Czech Republic; Ondřej Synek	6:37.51
M2x	France; Jean-Baptiste Macquet; Adrien Hardy	6:07.60	Slovenia; Luka Špik; Iztok Čop	6:09.79	Great Britain; Matthew Wells; Stephen Rowbotham	6:10.95
M2-	Australia; Drew Ginn; Duncan Free	6:18.00	New Zealand; Nathan Twaddle; George Bridgewater	6:19.13	Canada; Kevin Light; Malcolm Howard	6:21.83
M2+	Serbia and Montenegro; Nikola Stojić; Jovan Popović; Ivan Ninković	6:51.27	Italy; Francesco Gabriele; Dario Cerasola; Andrea Riva	6:54.39	Canada; Andrew Byrnes; Derek O'Farrell; Brian Price	6:55.41
M4x	Poland; Konrad Wasielewski; Marek Kolbowicz; Michał Jeliński; Adam Korol	5:38.99	Ukraine; Volodymyr Pavlovskiy; Dmytro Prokopenko; Serhiy Biloushchenko; Sergiy Gryn	5:40.47	Estonia; Allar Raja; Igor Kuzmin; Tõnu Endrekson; Andrei Jämsä	5:41.23
M4-	Great Britain; Steve Williams; Pete Reed; Alex Partridge; Andrew Triggs Hodge	5:43.75	Germany; Gregor Hauffe; Toni Seifert; Urs Käufer; Filip Adamski	5:44.64	Netherlands; Geert Cirkel; Jan-Willem Gabriëls; Matthijs Vellenga; Gijs Vermeulen	5:45.54
M4+	Germany; Jan-Martin Bröer; Matthias Flach; Philipp Naruhn; Florian Eichner; Martin Sauer	6:05.77	Canada; Max Lang; Chris Aylard; Robert Gibson; Will Crothers; Stephen Cheng	6:06.47	New Zealand; James Dallinger; Steven Cottle; Paul Gerritsen; Dane Boswell; Daniel Quigley	6:07.37
M8+	Germany; Jörg Dießner; Sebastian Schulte; Stephan Koltzk; Philipp Stüer; Jan Tebrügge; Ulf Siemes; Thorsten Engelmann; Bernd Heidicker; Peter Thiede	5:21.85	Italy; Lorenzo Carboncini; Niccolò Mornati; Luca Agamennoni; Alessio Sartori; Mario Palmisano; Dario Dentale; Pierpaolo Frattini; Carlo Mornati; Gaetano Iannuzzi	5:23.29	United States; Paul Daniels; Matt Deakin; Steven Coppola; Kenneth Jurkowski; Giuseppe Lanzone; Daniel Walsh; Beau Hoopman; Marcus McElhenney; Christopher Liwski	5:24.14
Men's lightweight events
LM1x	Great Britain; Zac Purchase	6:47.82	Spain; Juan Zunzunegui Guimerans	6:50.14	New Zealand; Duncan Grant	6:52.73
LM2x	Denmark; Mads Rasmussen; Rasmus Quist Hansen	6:11.42	Italy; Marcello Miani; Elia Luini	6:14.90	France; Fabrice Moreau; Frédéric Dufour	6:15.94
LM2-	Germany; Ole Rückbrodt; Felix Otto	6:28.41	Spain; Juan Manuel Florido Pellón; Jesús González Álvarez	6:30.17	Italy; Andrea Caianiello; Salvatore Di Somma	6:30.64
LM4x	Italy; Gardino Pellolio; Daniele Gilardoni; Luca Moncada; Daniele Danesin	5:53.83	Germany; Kai Anspach; Martin Rückbrodt; Knud Lange; Christoph Schregel	5:55.87	France; Bastien Tabourier; Quentin Colard; Maxime Goisset; Rémi Di Girolamo	5:57.42
LM4-	China; Huang Zhongming; Wu Chongkui; Lin Zhang; Tian Jun	5:49.43	France; Franck Solforosi; Jérémy Pouge; Jean-Christophe Bette; Fabien Tilliet	5:51.26	Ireland; Gearoid Towey; Eugene Coakley; Richard Archibald; Paul Griffin	5:51.35
LM8+	Italy; Luigi Scala; Giorgio Tuccinardi; Livio La Padula; Franco Sancassani; Martino Goretti; Michele Savrie; Jiri Vlcek; Fabrizio Gabriele; Andrea Lenzi	5:36.35	Germany; Marc Rippel; Christian Scherhag; Björn Steinfurth; Alexander Bernhardt; Jost Schömann-Finck; Matthias Schömann-Finck; Lutz Ackermann; Matthias Veit; Felix Erdmann	5:38.48	Poland; Tomasz Kowalik; Łukasz Siemion; Mariusz Stańczuk; Jarosław Bielaszewski; Szymon Wiśniewski; Maciej Madej; Łukasz Pawłowski; Cezary Mrozowicz; Rafał Woźniak	5:38.71

=== Women ===
Non-Olympic classes

Event	Gold	Time	Silver	Time	Bronze	Time
W1x	Belarus; Ekaterina Karsten-Khodotovitch	7:11.02	Czech Republic; Miroslava Knapková	7:15.02	Sweden; Frida Svensson	7:18.35
W2x	Australia; Elizabeth Kell; Brooke Pratley	6:47.67	Germany; Britta Oppelt; Susanne Schmidt	6:47.95	New Zealand; Georgina Evers-Swindell; Caroline Evers-Swindell	6:48.82
W2-	Canada; Darcy Marquardt; Jane Thornton	6:54.68	New Zealand; Juliette Haigh; Nicky Coles	6:56.72	Germany; Nicole Zimmermann; Elke Hipler	6:57.11
W4x	Great Britain; Debbie Flood; Sarah Winckless; Frances Houghton; Katherine Grainger	6:12.50	Australia; Catriona Sens; Sonia Mills; Dana Faletic; Sally Kehoe	6:13.99	Germany; Christiane Huth; Magdalena Schmude; Jeannine Hennicke; Stephanie Schiller	6:14.67
W4-	Australia; Robyn Selby Smith; Jo Lutz; Amber Bradley; Kate Hornsey	6:25.35	China; Yu Fei; Li Meng; Tong Li; Luo Xiuhua	6:26.75	United States; Portia Johnson; Erin Cafaro; Esther Lofgren; Rachel Jeffers	6:28.66
W8+	United States; Brett Sickler; Megan Cooke; Anna Goodale; Lindsay Shoop; Anna Mickelson; Susan Francia; Caroline Lind; Caryn Davies; Mary Whipple	5:55.50	Germany; Nina Wengert; Johanna Rönfeldt; Christina Gerking; Nadine Schmutzler; Lenka Wech; Maren Derlien; Nicole Zimmermann; Elke Hipler; Annina Ruppel	5:57.29	Australia; Jo Lutz; Robyn Selby Smith; Amber Bradley; Kate Hornsey; Emily Martin; Sarah Cook; Kim Crow; Sarah Heard; Lizzy Patrick	6:00.29
Women's lightweight events
LW1x	Netherlands; Marit van Eupen	7:32.26	Germany; Berit Carow	7:33.61	Spain; Teresa Mas De Xaxars	7:34.98
LW2x	China; Xu Dongxiang; Yan Shimin	6:55.12	Australia; Marguerite Houston; Amber Halliday	6:56.57	Greece; Chrysi Biskitzi; Alexandra Tsiavou	6:57.14
LW4x	China; Yu Hua; Chen Haixia; Fan Xuefei; Liu Jing	6:23.96	Denmark; Kirsten Jepsen; Sine Christiansen; Katrin Olsen; Juliane Rasmussen	6:28.16	Great Britain; Laura Ralston; Lindsay Dick; Hester Goodsell; Sophie Hosking	6:30.02

=== Pararowing ===
The Pararowing classes were held over 1000 metres.

Event	Gold	Time	Silver	Time	Bronze	Time
AM1x	Australia; Dominic Monypenny	5:28,87	United States; Ronald Harvey	5:41,83	Great Britain; Shaun Sewell	5:55,23
AW1x	Great Britain; Helene Raynsford	6:14,87	United States; Patricia Rollison	6:23,10	Poland; Martyna Snopek	6:25,67
TA2x	United States; Scott Brown; Angela Madsen	4:20,50	Poland; Jolanta Pawlak; Piotr Majka		Canada; Caitlin Renneson; Wilfredo More Wilson	4:30,86
LTAMx4+	Great Britain; Naomi Riches; Vicki Hansford; Alastair McKean; Alan Crowther; Alan Sherman (cox)	3:28,21	Netherlands; Joleen Hakker; Trees Blankennagel; Paul de Jong; Martin Lauriks; Tonia Harmsen (cox)	3:32,62	Canada; Anthony Theriault; Karen van Nest; Meghan Montgomery; John Moorcroft; Emma Ferguson (cox)	3:35,19

== Medal table ==
Rank	Nation	Gold	Silver	Bronze	Total
1	Germany	3	7	2	12
2	Australia	3	2	1	6
3	China	3	1	0	4
4	Great Britain	3	0	2	5
5	Italy	2	3	1	6
6	New Zealand	1	2	3	6
7	Canada	1	1	2	4
7	France	1	1	2	4
9	Denmark	1	1	0	2
10	United States	1	0	2	3
11	Netherlands	1	0	1	2
11	Poland	1	0	1	2
13	Belarus	1	0	0	1
13	Serbia and Montenegro	1	0	0	1
15	Spain	0	2	1	3
16	Czech Republic	0	1	1	2
17	Slovenia	0	1	0	1
17	Ukraine	0	1	0	1
19	Estonia	0	0	1	1
19	Greece	0	0	1	1
19	Ireland	0	0	1	1
19	Sweden	0	0	1	1
Totals (22 entries)		23	23	23	69
