= Laura Greenhalgh =

British rower (born 1985)

Medal record

Women's rowing

Representing the United Kingdom

World Rowing Championships
Silver medal – second place	2007 Munich	LW4x
Silver medal – second place	2009 Poznań	LW4x

Laura Greenhalgh (born 2 September 1985, in Oxford) is a British rower.
