= Tara Kelly =

Australian rower

Personal information
- Born: 21 June 1985 (age 41)
- Years active: 1999-2007

Sport
- Sport: Rowing
- Club: Tweed Heads Rowing Club
Medal record
Women's rowing
Representing Australia
World Rowing Championships
Gold medal – first place	2007 Munich	LW4x
World Rowing U23 Championships
Silver medal – second place	2005 Amsterdam	LW2x
Bronze medal – third place	2004 Poznan	LW2x
World Junior Rowing Championships
Gold medal – first place	2003 Athens	LW2x

Tara Kelly (born 21 June 1985) is an Australian former representative lightweight rower. She was a national champion and 2007 world champion.

== Club and state rowing ==
Kelly was educated at St Joseph's Queensland where she took up rowing. She won the national Schoolgirl Scull title at the Australian Rowing Championships in 2001.

Kelly's senior rowing was done from the Tweed Heads Rowing Club.

In 2007, Kelly rowed in the Queensland state representative crew contesting the Victoria Cup in the women's lightweight quad scull at the Interstate Regatta within the Australian Rowing Championships. In Tweed Heads Rowing Club colours she also contested national titles at the Australian Rowing Championships. She raced in the lightweight double scull in 2006; in the lightweight quad scull in 2007; and she contested the lightweight single scull event in 2006 winning that year's Australian title.

== International representative rowing ==
Kelly first represented Australia at the 2003 Junior World Rowing Championships in Athens. In a double scull with Sally Kehoe she won gold and a junior world title. In 2004 and 2005, she represented at the World Rowing U23 Championships in the double scull. She placed third with Susanne Brown in Poznan in 2004 and second with Anna McRae in Amsterdam in 2005.

Kelly was elevated to the senior Australian women's lightweight quad for the 2007 World Rowing Championships in Munich. Seated in stroke seat with Bronwen Watson, Miranda Bennett, and Alice McNamara they won their heat and lead the final from the 500 m mark to claim the gold and Kelly's first and only senior World Championship title.
