= Hannah Every-Hall =

Australian rower

Personal information
- Born: 18 November 1977 (age 48) Bendigo, Victoria
- Education: Masters of Nutrition
- Years active: 1999–2016
- Height: 165 cm (5 ft 5 in)
- Spouse: Michael Hall

Sport
- Sport: Rowing
- Club: Banks Rowing Club
Medal record
Women's rowing
Representing Australia
World Rowing Championships
Gold medal – first place	2002 Seville	LW4x
Silver medal – second place	2014 Amsterdam	LW4x

Hannah Every-Hall (born 18 November 1977 in Bendigo) is an Australian former rower, a national champion, World Champion and Olympian. She is married to Michael Hall (born 19 November 1983) and they have a son named Harrison Hall (born 19 November 2006)

== Club and state rowing ==
Every-Hall's senior rowing was done from the Banks Rowing Club in Melbourne and the Dutton Park Rowing Club in Brisbane.

She raced in Victorian representative women's lightweight quad sculls who contested the Victoria Cup at the Interstate Regatta in 1999 (to victory), 2000, 2001 and 2002.

Following her 2002 World Championship success Every-Hall took ill while preparing for the 2004 Summer Olympics and discovered she had exercise induced anaphylactic shock. She left rowing to have a family and had sons born in 2006 and 2008. She coached at her local club, which was predominantly masters rowing and occasionally got back into rowing herself. She entered competition again, 2009 Masters and then Senior A for the 2010 season Australian Rowing Championships, where she dominated the field winning the lightweight single, double and quad sculling events and was selected in Queensland representative crews. She won the National Championships in the lightweight single scull in 2011 and 2012. She finished 2nd in the same event in 2014 and 2016.

She raced for Queensland for the Victoria Cup in quad sculls in 2010, 2011 (stroking the boat to victory), 2012 and 2014.

== International representative rowing ==
Every-Hall made her Australian representative debut at the 1999 Nations Cup in Hamburg, Germany - the equivalent of today's World Rowing U23 Championships. She won gold in the lightweight double scull with Amber Halliday in an age group world best time.

She made her first Australian senior representative appearance in the lightweight quad at the 2002 World Rowing Championships in Seville, Spain. She stroked the crew of Marguerite Houston, Miranda Bennett and Zita van de Walle to a gold medal, a World Championship title and a new world record time. It was Australia's second successive World Championship win in this boat class.

Having given up rowing after a number of setbacks and deciding to start a family (sons Harry born 2006 and Charlie born 2008) Hannah Every-Hall returned to international rowing in 2010. In one of her first major events back on the circuit, Every-Hall won gold in the lightweight double with Alice McNamara at the 2010 World Cup. They went on to place fourth at the 2010 World Championships at Lake Karapiro in New Zealand.

She raced again with McNamara in a double scull at Bled 2011 and they again placed fifth.

Ahead of the 2012 London Olympics teamed up with Bronwen Watson in a women's lightweight double scull. They qualified the boat at World Rowing Cup events that year in Europe and raced at the Olympics at Eton, Dorney where they finished 5th in the final.

At the 2014 World Rowing Championships in Amsterdam she stroked the Australian lightweight quad scull of Sarah Pound, Maia Simmonds and Laura Dunn to a silver medal.

She rowed an Australian lightweight double scull at the final Olympic qualifying regatta in Lucerne in 2016 attempting to make the boat for Rio 2016. But they did not place and Every-Hall had rowed her last selection for Australia after a seventeen-year representative career.
