= Luigi Scala =

Italian rower

Personal information
- Born: 25 January 1979 (age 47)

Sport
- Sport: Rowing
Medal record
Men's rowing
Representing Italy
World Championships
Gold medal – first place	2002 Seville	Lwt eight
Gold medal – first place	2005 Kaizu, Gifu	Lwt eight
Gold medal – first place	2006 Dorney	Lwt eight
Gold medal – first place	2009 Poznań	Lwt eight
Silver medal – second place	2004 Banyoles	Lwt eight
Silver medal – second place	2011 Bled	Lwt eight
Bronze medal – third place	2007 Munich	Lwt eight
Bronze medal – third place	2010 Karapiro	Lwt eight

Luigi Scala (born 25 January 1979) is an Italian lightweight rower. He won a gold medal at the 2002 World Rowing Championships in Seville with the lightweight men's eight.
