= Armando Dell'Aquila =

Italian rower

Medal record

Men's rowing

Representing Italy

World Championships
Gold medal – first place	2007 Munich	LM2-
Gold medal – first place	2012 Plovdiv	LM2-
Silver medal – second place	2008 Linz	LM2-
Silver medal – second place	2009 Poznań	LM2-
Silver medal – second place	2011 Lake Bled	LM2-
Silver medal – second place	2014 Amsterdam	LM8+
Bronze medal – third place	2010 Karapiro	LM8+

Armando Dell'Aquila (born 20 August 1987 in Scafati) is an Italian rower.
