= Florian Eichner =

German rower

Medal record

Men's rowing

Representing Germany

World Championships
Gold medal – first place	2006 Eton	M4+
Silver medal – second place	2007 Munich	M8+
Bronze medal – third place	2009 Poznań	M2+

Florian Eichner (born 16 December 1985 in Quedlinburg) is a German rower. He competed at the 2008 Summer Olympics.
