= Daniele Danesin =

Italian rower

Medal record

Men's rowing

Representing Italy

World Rowing Championships
Gold medal – first place	2005 Gifu	LM8+
Gold medal – first place	2006 Eton	LM4x
Gold medal – first place	2007 Munich	LM4x
Gold medal – first place	2008 Linz	LM4x
Silver medal – second place	2011 Bled	LM4-

Daniele Danesin (born 7 December 1985 in Como) is an Italian rower, who has won five gold medals at various World Rowing Championships. He has also represented Italy at the 2012 Summer Olympics. After rowing, Daniele moved to New Zealand and became an ultra marathon runner.
