= Matthias Schömann-Finck =

German rower (born 1979)

Medal record

Men's rowing

Representing Germany

World Championships
Gold medal – first place	2009 Poznań	LM4-
Gold medal – first place	2012 Plovdiv	LM8+
Silver medal – second place	2006 Eton	LM8+
Silver medal – second place	2007 Munich	LM8+
Silver medal – second place	2008 Linz	LM8+
Bronze medal – third place	2003 Milan	LM4x
Bronze medal – third place	2004 Banyoles	LM4x

Matthias Schömann-Finck (born 5 March 1979, in Bernkastel-Kues) is a former German lightweight rower. In 2009 Schomann-Finck was part of the team of four that won the World Championship in the lightweight coxless four. The team included his brother, Jost. Both brothers became worldchampions again in 2012 in the lightweight eight. Matthias Schömann-Finck retired from international rowing in February 2016.
