= Monika Myszk =

Polish rower

Medal record

Women's rowing

Representing Poland

World Rowing Championships
Silver medal – second place	2008 Linz	LW4x

Monika Myszk (born 24 March 1982 in Gdynia) is a Polish rower.
