= Stesha Carle =

American rower (born 1984)

Personal information
- Born: December 2, 1984 (age 41) La Habra, California, U.S.
Medal record
Women's rowing
Representing the United States
World Rowing Championships
Silver medal – second place	2008 Linz	W4-
Silver medal – second place	2009 Poznań	W4x
Silver medal – second place	2011 Bled	W4x

Stesha Carle (born December 2, 1984, in La Habra, California) is an American rower.
