= Magdalena Kemnitz =

Polish rower (born 1985)

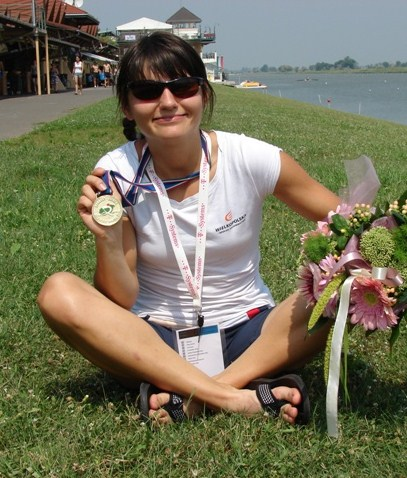

Personal information
- Born: 13 March 1985 (age 41) Poznań, Poland
Medal record
Magdalena Kemnitz
Medal record
Women's rowing
Representing Poland
World Rowing Championships
| Gold medal – first place | 2012 Plovdiv | Lwt quad scull |
| Silver medal – second place | 2008 Linz | Lwt quad scull |
| Silver medal – second place | 2009 Poznań | Lwt double scull |
European Rowing Championships
| Silver medal – second place | 2007 Poznań | Lwt double scull |
| Silver medal – second place | 2009 Brest | Lwt double scull |
| Silver medal – second place | 2010 Montemor-o-Velho | Lwt double scull |

Magdalena Kemnitz (born 13 March 1985) is a Polish rower.
