= Jaap Schouten =

Dutch rower (born 1984)

Medal record

Men's rowing

Representing the Netherlands

World Rowing Championships
Silver medal – second place	2008 Linz	LM1x
Bronze medal – third place	2007 Munich	LM1x

Jaap Schouten (born 9 December 1984 in The Hague) is a Dutch rower.
