= Daniele Gilardoni =

Italian rower

Personal information
- National team: Italy
- Born: 1 April 1976 (age 50) Lecco, Italy

Sport
- Country: Italy
- Sport: Rowing
- Club: S.C. Milano

Achievements and titles
- Olympic finals: Beijing 2008
Medal record
Event	1st	2nd	3rd
Olympic Games	0	0	0
World Championships	11	1	1
European Championships	0	1	1
Total	11	2	2
World Championships
Gold medal – first place	1999 St. Catharines	LM4x
Gold medal – first place	2001 Lucerne	LM4x
Gold medal – first place	2002 Seville	LM4x
Gold medal – first place	2003 Milan	LM4x
Gold medal – first place	2004 Banyoles	LM4x
Gold medal – first place	2005 Kaizu	LM4x
Gold medal – first place	2006 Dorney	LM4x
Gold medal – first place	2007 Oberschleißheim	LM4x
Gold medal – first place	2008 Ottensheim	LM4x
Gold medal – first place	2009 Poznań	LM4x
Gold medal – first place	2011 Bled	LM4x
Silver medal – second place	2000 Zagreb	LM4x
Bronze medal – third place	1998 Cologne	LM8+
European Championships
Silver medal – second place	2008 Marathon	LM2x

Daniele Gilardoni (born 1 April 1976) is an Italian lightweight rower. He is rated among the Top 10 male rowers active in 2008 and is an eleven-time gold medalist at the World Rowing Championships.

After his sports career he became the manager of Italians Rowing Colleges ("College Remiero Pavia" and "College Remiero Ferrara") and a Vice President of the Associazione Nazionale Atleti Canottaggio (National Association of Rowers).

== See also ==
- Most successful athlete in each sport at the World Championships
