= Pamela Weisshaupt =

Swiss rower (born 1979)

Medal record

Women's rowing

Representing Switzerland

World Rowing Championships
Gold medal – first place	2008 Linz	LW1x
Gold medal – first place	2009 Poznań	LW1x
Silver medal – second place	2011 Lake Bled	LW1x

Pamela Weisshaupt (born 2 March 1979 in Zurich) is a Swiss rower.
