= Pierre-Étienne Pollez =

French rower

Medal record

Men's rowing

Representing France

World Rowing Championships
Silver medal – second place	2007 Munich	LM4x
Silver medal – second place	2008 Linz	LM4x
Silver medal – second place	2010 Karapiro	LM4x

Pierre-Étienne Pollez (born 19 July 1983 in Meudon) is a French rower.
