= Bronwen Watson =

Australian rower

Personal information
- Nickname: Bron
- Nationality: Australian
- Born: 23 February 1977 (age 49) Milton, New South Wales, Australia
- Height: 168 cm (66 in) (2012)
- Weight: 57 kg (126 lb) (2012)

Sport
- Country: Australia
- Sport: Rowing
- Club: Sydney University Boat Club
- Retired: 2003, 2008
Medal record
Women's rowing
Representing Australia
World Rowing Championships
Gold medal – first place	2007 Munich	Lwt quad scull
Gold medal – first place	2008 Linz	Lwt quad scull
Bronze medal – third place	2003 Milan	Lwt quad scull

Bronwe Watson (born 23 February 1977) is an Australian former representative rower. She is a national champion, two-time World Champion and an Olympian.

== Personal ==
Watson was born in Milton, New South Wales. Her father David is an Olympian, who competed at the 1968 Mexico City Olympics in road cycling. She attended Heathcote High School and As of 2012 lived in Sydney, and worked at the University of Sydney.

== Club and state rowing ==
Watson competed in the lightweight category and had most success in double and quad sculls. She was coached by Phil Bourguignon, and rowed from the Sydney University Boat Club. She held a rowing scholarship with the New South Wales Institute of Sport.

After some representative success in 2003, Watson retired. She came out of retirement in 2005 to take up social rowing in England, and to compete the 2005 Women's and Royal Henley, winning the lightweight pair that year. Following this, she moved back to Australia and took a position as a girls high school rowing coach, followed by further sport administrative work with the NSW Institute of Sports and Sydney Uni Sport and Fitness.

== National representative rowing ==
Watson made her Australian representative debut in 2003 in the Australian lightweight quad scull at the World Rowing Cup III in Lucerne. She had to compete to earn her spot in the Australian quad crew for the 2003 World Championships, with five women trying to earn four spots. At the 2003 World Rowing Championships in Milan, Watson won a bronze medal in the women's lightweight quad scull. Following the competition, she retired from rowing for the first time.

She returned to club rowing in the 2006/2007 season and successfully earned a position on the Australian Rowing Team. At the 2007 World Rowing Championships in Munich, she won a gold medal in the women's lightweight quad with Miranda Bennett, Alice McNamara and Tara Kelly.

At the 2008 World Rowing Championships in Linz/Ottensheim, Austria she won her second world title and gold medal in the women's lightweight quad scull. In 2009, she competed for the fourth time at World Championships this time in the women's lightweight double scull with McNamara. Her boat qualified for the finals and finished fifth overall.

After her participation in the 2010 Australian Rowing Championships she announced her second retirement in April 2010. She came out of retirement in September 2010 to compete in the New Zealand hosted Great Race, where she rowed for Sydney University in the Bryan Gould Cup. She did not begin her comeback for the 2012 Summer Olympics until midway through 2011 after moving home from a stint living in Tokyo, Japan.

Despite fracturing her L3 vertebrae during training in February 2012, Watson persevered and was able to complete a strenuous rehab/training program which enable her to earn selection for the 2012 Olympic Team. Watson finished seventh in the lightweight double event at the 2012 World Cup 3 in Munich, Germany and ninth in the lightweight double event at the 2012 World Cup 2 in Lucerne, Switzerland. She was selected to represent Australia at the 2012 Summer Olympics rowing in the lightweight women's 2X with her partner Hannah Every-Hall from Victoria. Prior to going to London, she participated in a training camp at the Australian Institute of Sport European Training Centre in Varese, Italy after having taken part in another team training camp in Sydney. Watson and Every-Hall qualified through to the Olympic A final finishing fifth overall.
