= Feng Guixin =

Chinese rower

Feng Guixin (Chinese: 冯桂鑫; pinyin: Féng Guìxīn; born 11 February 1982 in Chaoyang, Liaoning) is a female Chinese rower, who was to compete for Team China at the 2008 Summer Olympics in the women's quadruple sculls event. However, she was later replaced by Zhang Yangyang, and did not compete; the reconstituted team went on to win gold.

== Major performances ==
- 2005 National Games – 1st double sculls;
- 2007 World Championships – 3rd quadruple sculls;
- 2008 World Cup Lucerne – 1st quadruple sculls
