= Dennis Beemsterboer =

Dutch rower

Personal information
- Born: 13 November 1982 (age 43)

Sport
- Sport: Rowing
Medal record
Men's rowing
Representing the Netherlands
World Rowing Championships
Gold medal – first place	2007 Munich	Lwt eight
Bronze medal – third place	2008 Ottensheim	Lwt eight

Dennis Beemsterboer (born 13 November 1982) is a Dutch lightweight rower. He won a gold medal at the 2007 World Rowing Championships in Munich with the lightweight men's eight.
