= Rémi Di Girolamo =

French rower (born 1982)

Medal record

Men's rowing

Representing France

World Rowing Championships
Silver medal – second place	2007 Munich	LM4x
Silver medal – second place	2008 Linz	LM4x
Bronze medal – third place	2006 Eton	LM4x

Remi Di Girolamo (born 26 April 1982 in Argenteuil) is a French rower.
