= Brett Sickler =

American rower

Medal record

Women's rowing

Representing United States

World Rowing Championships
Gold medal – first place	2006 Eton	W8+
Gold medal – first place	2007 Munich	W8+

Brett Sickler (born March 19, 1983, in Cupertino, California) is an American rower. Sickler is a three-time member of the US rowing senior national team and won gold medals with the women's eight at the 2006 and 2007 World Rowing Championships. She finished 12th in the women's double sculls at the 2006 world regatta and was a Team USA alternate for the 2008 Beijing Olympic Games. Sickler graduated from the University of Michigan in 2005 and was the lead assistant coach from 2010 to 2012 where she helped coach the Wolverines to a second-place finish at the 2012 NCAA Championships and the 2012 Big Ten Championship title. She was named the assistant coach for the University of Virginia rowing team in August 2012.
