= Chen Haixia =

Chinese rower

- Born: 11 February 1987 (age 39); Zengcheng, Guangdong, China
- Occupation: rower

Chen Haixia (born 11 February 1987 in Zengcheng, Guangdong) is a female Chinese rower.

== Major performances ==
- 2005 World Cup (Leg 3) – 1st LW2X;
- 2005 National Games – 2nd LW2X/LW4X;
- 2006/2007 World Championships – 1st LW4X/6th LW2X;
- 2006 National Championships – 1st LW4X;
- 2007 World Cup Leg 1/Leg2 – 2nd/1st LW2X
