= Jost Schömann-Finck =

German rower

Medal record

Men's rowing

Representing Germany

World Championships
Gold medal – first place	2009 Poznań	LM4-
Gold medal – first place	2010 Karapiro	LM8+
Gold medal – first place	2012 Plovdiv	LM8+
Silver medal – second place	2006 Eton	LM8+
Silver medal – second place	2007 Munich	LM8+
Silver medal – second place	2014 Amsterdam	LM4x

Jost Schömann-Finck (born 8 October 1982, in Zell) is a German rower.
