= 2007 World Rowing Championships =

International rowing event

- Venue: Oberschleißheim Regatta Course
- Location: Oberschleißheim, near Munich, Germany
- Dates: 26 August to 2 September

The 2007 World Rowing Championships were World Rowing Championships that were held from 26 August to 2 September 2007 at Oberschleißheim Regatta Course in Oberschleißheim near Munich, Germany.

== Medal summary ==
=== Men's events ===
Non-Olympic classes

Event:	Gold:	Time	Silver:	Time	Bronze:	Time
M1x	New Zealand; Mahé Drysdale	6:45.67	Czech Republic; Ondřej Synek	6:46.48	Norway; Olaf Tufte	6:47.58
M2x	Slovenia; Luka Špik (b); Iztok Čop (s)	6:16.65	France; Jean-Baptiste Macquet (b); Adrien Hardy (s)	6:16.93	Estonia; Tõnu Endrekson (b); Jüri Jaanson (s)	6:18.32
M4x	Poland; Konrad Wasielewski (b); Marek Kolbowicz (2); Michał Jeliński (3); Adam Korol (s)	5:49.42	France; Jean-David Bernard (b); Cédric Berrest (2); Jonathan Coeffic (3); Julien Bahain (s)	5:50.95	Germany; René Bertram (b); Karsten Brodowski (2); Hans Gruhne (3); Robert Sens (s)	5:52.40
M2+	Poland; Dawid Pacześ (b); Łukasz Kardas (s); Daniel Trojanowski (c)	7:00.10	Italy; Francesco Gabriele (b); Valerio Massimo (s); Gianluca Barattolo (c)	7:01.84	Canada; Kristopher McDaniel (b); Derek O'Farrell (s); Brian Price (c)	7:02.94
M2-	Australia; Drew Ginn (b); Duncan Free (s)	6:24.89	New Zealand; Nathan Twaddle (b); George Bridgewater (s)	6:30.19	Great Britain; Colin Smith (b); Matt Langridge (s)	6:31.06
M4+	United States; Matt Deakin (b); Dan Beery (2); Samuel Burns (3); Christopher Liwski (s); Edmund del Guercio (c)	6:10.36	Serbia; Marko Marjanović (b); Jovan Popović (2); Goran Jagar (3); Nikola Stojić (s); Saša Mimić (c)	6:11.17	Germany; Florian Mennigen (b); Stephan Koltzk (2); Philipp Naruhn (3); Matthias Flach (s); Martin Sauer (c)	6:12.49
M4-	New Zealand; Carl Meyer (b); James Dallinger (2); Eric Murray (3); Hamish Bond (s)	5:54.24	Italy; Carlo Mornati (b); Alessio Sartori (2); Niccolò Mornati (3); Lorenzo Carboncini (s)	5:55.15	Netherlands; Geert Cirkel (b); Matthijs Vellenga (2); Jan-Willem Gabriëls (3); Gijs Vermeulen (s)	5:55.49
M8+	Canada; Kevin Light (b); Ben Rutledge (2); Andrew Byrnes (3); Jake Wetzel (4); Malcolm Howard (5); Dominic Seiterle (6); Adam Kreek (7); Kyle Hamilton (s); Brian Price (c)	5:34.92	Germany; Jörg Dießner (b); Florian Eichner (2); Ulf Siemes (3); Jan Tebrügge (4); Sebastian Schulte (5); Thorsten Engelmann (6); Philipp Stüer (7); Bernd Heidicker (s); Peter Thiede (c)	5:37.19	Great Britain; Tom James (b); Tom Stallard (2); Tom Lucy (3); Tom Solesbury (4); Josh West (5); Richard Egington (6); Robin Bourne-Taylor (7); Alastair Heathcote (s); Acer Nethercott (c)	5:37.95
Men's lightweight events
LM1x	New Zealand; Duncan Grant	6:53.89	Italy; Lorenzo Bertini	6:57.43	Netherlands; Jaap Schouten	6:58.81
LM2x	Denmark; Mads Rasmussen (b); Rasmus Quist Hansen (s)	6:24.21	Greece; Dimitrios Mougios (b); Vasileios Polymeros (s)	6:25.89	Great Britain; Zac Purchase (b); Mark Hunter (s)	6:26.92
LM4x	Italy; Leonardo Pettinari (b); Daniele Gilardoni (2); Luca Moncada (3); Daniele Danesin (s)	6:01.70	France; Rémi Di Girolamo (b); Pierre-Étienne Pollez (2); Maxime Goisset (3); Fabien Dufour (s)	6:02.94	Great Britain; Simon Jones (b); Rob Williams (2); Chris Bartley (3); Dave Currie (s)	6:03.83
LM2-	Italy; Andrea Caianiello (b); Armando Dell'Aquila (s)	6:38.00	Germany; Jochen Kühner (b); Martin Kühner (s)	6:39.43	Australia; Ross Brown (b); Michael McBryde (s)	6:42.05
LM4-	Great Britain; Richard Chambers (b); James Lindsay-Fynn (2); Paul Mattick (3); James Clarke (s)	6:16.21	France; Franck Solforosi (b); Jérémy Pouge (2); Jean-Christophe Bette (3); Fabien Tilliet (s)	6:17.43	Italy; Jiri Vlcek (b); Catello Amarante (2); Salvatore Amitrano (3); Bruno Mascarenhas (s)	6:17.49
LM8+	Netherlands; Tom van den Broek (b); Pieter Bottema (2); Wolter Blankert (3); Dennis Beemsterboer (4); Maarten Tromp (5); Arnoud Greidanus (6); Alwin Snijders (7); Marshall Godschalk (s); Peter Wiersum (c)	5:42.06	Germany; Matthias Schömann-Finck (b); Jost Schömann-Finck (2); Martin Rückbrodt (3); Ole Rückbrodt (4); Björn Steinfurth (5); Matthias Veit (6); Lutz Ackermann (7); Joel El-Qalqili (s); Felix Erdmann (c)	5:44.52	Italy; Luigi Scala (b); Giorgio Tuccinardi (2); Livio La Padula (3); Salvatore Di Somma (4); Michele Savrie (5); Dario Cesarola (6); Nicola Moriconi (7); Fabrizio Gabriele (s); Andrea Lenzi (c)	5:46.33

=== Women's events ===
Non-Olympic classes

Event:	Gold:	Time	Silver:	Time	Bronze:	Time
W1x	Belarus; Ekaterina Karsten-Khodotovitch	7:26.52	Bulgaria; Rumyana Neykova	7:27.91	United States; Michelle Guerette	7:28.48
W2x	China; Li Qin (b); Tian Liang (s)	6:54.38	New Zealand; Georgina Evers-Swindell (b); Caroline Evers-Swindell (s)	6:57.72	Great Britain; Elise Laverick (b); Anna Bebington (s)	6:57.74
W4x	Great Britain; Annabel Vernon (b); Debbie Flood (2); Frances Houghton (3); Katherine Grainger (s)	6:30.81	Germany; Kathrin Boron (b); Manuela Lutze (2); Britta Oppelt (3); Stephanie Schiller (s)	6:32.02	China; Tang Bin (b); Xi Aihua (2); Jin Ziwei (3); Feng Guixin (s)	6:33.91
W2-	Belarus; Yuliya Bichyk (b); Natallia Helakh (s)	7:06.56	Germany; Nicole Zimmermann (b); Elke Hipler (s)	7:07.99	Romania; Georgeta Damian-Andrunache (b); Viorica Susanu (s)	7:08.87
W4-	United States; Portia McGee (b); Erin Cafaro (2); Rachel Jeffers (3); Megan Dirkmaat (s)	6:37.94	Germany; Nina Wengert (b); Nadine Schmutzler (2); Kerstin Naumann (3); Silke Günther (s)	6:40.36	Australia; Phoebe Stanley (b); Katelyn Gray (2); Emily Martin (3); Victoria Roberts (s)	6:43.03
W8+	United States; Brett Sickler (b); Lindsay Shoop (2); Anna Goodale (3); Samantha Magee (4); Anna Mickelson (5); Susan Francia (6); Caroline Lind (7); Caryn Davies (s); Mary Whipple (c)	6:17.20	Romania; Rodica Serban-Florea (b); Viorica Susanu (2); Simona Mușat (3); Ana Maria Apachitei (4); Aurica Bărăscu (5); Ioana Papuc (6); Georgeta Damian-Andrunache (7); Doina Ignat (s); Elena Georgescu (c)	6:18.33	Great Britain; Carla Ashford (b); Baz Moffat (2); Alice Freeman (3); Louisa Reeve (4); Natasha Howard (5); Alison Knowles (6); Catherine Greves (7); Jessica Eddie (s); Caroline O'Connor (c)	6:19.66
Women's lightweight events
LW1x	Netherlands; Marit van Eupen	7:38.02	United States; Jennifer Goldsack	7:39.59	Canada; Melanie Kok	7:45.24
LW2x	Australia; Amber Halliday (b); Marguerite Houston (s)	7:07.18	Finland; Sanna Stén (b); Minna Nieminen (s)	7:07.41	Denmark; Katrin Olsen (b); Juliane Rasmussen (s); Germany; Berit Carow (b); Marie-Louise Dräger (s)	7:08.97
LW4x	Australia; Bronwen Watson (b); Miranda Bennett (2); Alice McNamara (3); Tara Kelly (s)	6:35.97	Great Britain; Sophie Hosking (b); Laura Greenhalgh (2); Mathilde Pauls (3); Jane Hall (s)	6:38.78	China; Jing Liu (b); Jing Jia (2); Hua Yu (3); Yan Shimin (s)	6:40.32

=== Pararowing events ===
Event:	Gold:	Time	Silver:	Time	Bronze:	Time
AM1x	Great Britain; Tom Aggar	5:13.13	Australia; Dominic Monypenny	5:14.72	Israel; Eli Nawi	5:15.04
AW1x	Brazil; Cláudia Santos	5:57.58	Belarus; Liudmila Vauchok	5:58.57	Poland; Martyna Snopek	6:08.54
TA2x	Brazil; Lucas Pagani (b); Josiane Lima (s)	4:10.69	Australia; John Maclean (b); Kathryn Ross (s)	4:13.24	Poland; Piotr Majka (b); Jolanta Pawlak (s)	4:16.74
LTAMX4+	Germany; Kathrin Wolff (b); Marcus Klemp (2); Michael Sauer (3); Susanne Lackner (s); Arne Maury (c)	3:34.99	Great Britain; Victoria Hansford (b); Alan Crowther (2); Alastair McKean (3); Naomi Riches (s); Alan Sherman (c)	3:36.19	Canada; Anthony Theriault (b); Scott Rand (2); Meghan Montgomery (3); Victoria Nolan (s); Laura Comeau (c)	3:37.19

== Medal table ==
=== Men's and women's events ===
Place	Nation	1st place, gold medalist(s)	2nd place, silver medalist(s)	3rd place, bronze medalist(s)	Total
1	New Zealand	3	2	0	5
2	United States	3	1	1	5
3	Australia	3	0	2	5
4	Italy	2	3	2	7
5	Great Britain	2	1	6	9
6	Netherlands	2	0	2	4
7	Belarus	2	0	0	2
7	Poland	2	0	0	2
9	Canada	1	0	2	3
9	China	1	0	2	3
11	Denmark	1	0	1	2
12	Slovenia	1	0	0	1
13	Germany	0	6	3	9
14	France	0	4	0	4
15	Romania	0	1	1	2
16	Bulgaria	0	1	0	1
16	Czech Republic	0	1	0	1
16	Finland	0	1	0	1
16	Greece	0	1	0	1
16	Serbia	0	1	0	1
20	Estonia	0	0	1	1
20	Norway	0	0	1	1
Total		23	23	24	70

=== Paralympic events ===
Place	Nation	1st place, gold medalist(s)	2nd place, silver medalist(s)	3rd place, bronze medalist(s)	Total
1	Brazil	2	0	0	2
2	Great Britain	1	1	0	2
3	Germany	1	0	0	1
4	Australia	0	2	0	2
5	Belarus	0	1	0	1
6	Poland	0	0	2	2
7	Canada	0	0	1	1
7	Israel	0	0	1	1
Total		4	4	4	12
