= Felix Otto (rower) =

German rower (born 1983)

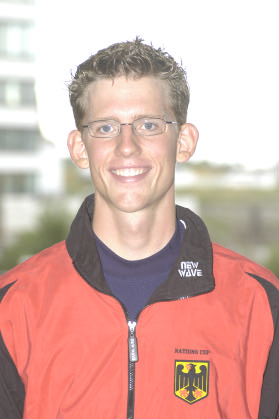
- Felix Otto in 2006

Medal record

Men's rowing

Representing Germany

World Rowing Championships
Gold medal – first place	2006 Eton	LM2-

Felix Otto (born 14 June 1983 in Düsseldorf) is a German rower. He won the gold medal in the men's lightweight coxless pair at the 2006 World Rowing Championships.
