= 2009 World Rowing Championships =

International rowing event

- Venue: Lake Malta
- Location: Poznań, Poland
- Dates: 23 to 30 August

The 2009 World Rowing Championships were World Rowing Championships that were held from 23 to 30 August 2009 at Lake Malta, Poznań, Poland. The annual week-long rowing regatta was organized by FISA (the International Rowing Federation), and held at the end of the northern hemisphere summer. In non-Olympic years it is the highlight of the international rowing calendar.

== Medal summary ==
=== Men's events ===
Non-Olympic classes

| Event | Gold | Time | Silver | Time | Bronze | Time |
|---|---|---|---|---|---|---|
| M1x | New Zealand; Mahé Drysdale | 6:33.25 | Great Britain; Alan Campbell | 6:34.30 | Czech Republic; Ondřej Synek | 6:38.53 |
| M2x | Germany; Eric Knittel; Stephan Krüger | 6:07.02 | France; Julien Bahain; Cédric Berrest | 6:07.82 | Estonia; Allar Raja; Kaspar Taimsoo | 6:07.86 |
| M4x | Poland; Konrad Wasielewski; Marek Kolbowicz; Michał Jeliński; Adam Korol | 5:38.53 | Australia; Nick Hudson; Jared Bidwell; David Crawshay; Daniel Noonan | 5:39.66 | Germany; Tim Grohmann; Karsten Brodowski; Marcel Hacker; Tim Bartels | 5:39.85 |
| M2+ | United States; Troy Kepper; Henrik Rummel; Marcus McElhenney | 6:53.58 | Czech Republic; Jakub Makovička; Václav Chalupa; Oldřich Hejdušek | 6:54.58 | Germany; Philipp Naruhn; Florian Eichner; Tim Berent | 6:55.44 |
| M2- | New Zealand; Eric Murray; Hamish Bond | 6:15.93 | Great Britain; Pete Reed; Andrew Triggs Hodge | 6:17.45 | Greece; Nikolaos Goudoulas; Apostolos Goudoulas | 6:23.01 |
| M4- | Great Britain; Alex Partridge; Richard Egington; Alex Gregory; Matt Langridge | 5:47.28 | Australia; Matt Ryan; James Marburg; Cameron McKenzie-McHarg; Francis Hegerty | 5:49.20 | Slovenia; Tomaž Pirih; Rok Rozman; Rok Kolander; Miha Pirih | 5:51.11 |
| M8+ | Germany; Urs Käufer; Gregor Hauffe; Florian Mennigen; Kristof Wilke; Richard Schmidt; Filip Adamski; Toni Seifert; Sebastian Schmidt; Martin Sauer | 5:24.13 | Canada; Steven Van Knotsenburg; Gabriel Bergen; Robert Gibson; Douglas Csima; Malcolm Howard; Andrew Byrnes; James Dunaway; Derek O'Farrell; Mark Laidlaw | 5:27.15 | Netherlands; Meindert Klem; Robert Lücken; David Kuiper; Jozef Klaassen; Olivier Siegelaar; Mitchel Steenman; Olaf van Andel; Diederik Simon; Peter Wiersum | 5:28.32 |
Men's lightweight events
| LM1x | New Zealand; Duncan Grant | 6:50.78 | Greece; Vasileios Polymeros | 6:52.33 | Denmark; Mads Rasmussen | 6:56.25 |
| LM2x | New Zealand; Storm Uru; Peter Taylor | 6:10.62 | France; Jérémie Azou; Frédéric Dufour | 6:12.57 | Italy; Marcello Miani; Elia Luini | 6:15.08 |
| LM4x | Italy; Franco Sancassani; Daniele Gilardoni; Lorenzo Bertini; Stefano Basalini | 5:47.50 | Germany; Knud Lange; Lars Wichert; Felix Övermann; Michael Wieler | 5:49.89 | Denmark; Hans Christian Sørensen; Christian Nielsen; Rasmus Quist Hansen; Andreas Ramboel | 5:51.67 |
| LM2- | France; Fabien Tilliet; Jean-Christophe Bette | 6:29.63 | Italy; Andrea Caianiello; Armando Dell'Aquila | 6:31.40 | Serbia; Nenad Babović; Miloš Tomić | 6:31.58 |
| LM4- | Germany; Matthias Schömann-Finck; Jost Schömann-Finck; Jochen Kühner; Martin Kühner | 5:50.77 | Denmark; Christian Pedersen; Jens Vilhelmsen; Kasper Winther Jørgensen; Morten Jørgensen | 5:51.02 | Poland; Łukasz Pawłowski; Łukasz Siemion; Miłosz Bernatajtys; Paweł Rańda | 5:52.70 |
| LM8+ | Italy; Luigi Scala; Davide Riccardi; Livio La Padula; Martino Goretti; Emiliano Ceccatelli; Gennaro Gallo; Jiri Vlcek; Bruno Mascarenhas; Andrea Lenzi | 5:33.92 | United States; John Dise; Kenneth McMahon; Ryan Fox; Andrew Diebold; Anthony Fahden; Matthew Muffelman; James Sopko; Matthew Kochem; Kerry Quinn | 5:37.15 | Netherlands; Thom Van Den Anker; Diederick Van Den Bouwhuijsen; Maarten Tromp; Jolmer Van Der Sluis; Stijn Verwey; Rutger Bruil; Dion Van Schie; Joeri Bruschinski; Ryan Der Drijver | 5:39.69 |

=== Women's events ===
Non-Olympic classes

| Event | Gold | Time | Silver | Time | Bronze | Time |
|---|---|---|---|---|---|---|
| W1x | Belarus; Ekaterina Karsten | 7:11.78 | Great Britain; Katherine Grainger | 7:13.57 | Czech Republic; Miroslava Knapková | 7:16.22 |
| W2x | Poland; Magdalena Fularczyk; Julia Michalska | 6:47.18 | Great Britain; Anna Bebington; Annabel Vernon | 6:48.82 | Bulgaria; Rumyana Neykova; Miglena Markova | 6:50.16 |
| W4x | Ukraine; Svitlana Spiriukhova; Tetiana Kolesnikova; Anastasiya Kozhenkova; Yana Dementyeva | 6:18.41 | United States; Megan Walsh; Stesha Carle; Sarah Trowbridge; Kathleen Bertko | 6:21.54 | Germany; Annekatrin Thiele; Peggy Waleska; Stephanie Schiller; Christiane Huth | 6:24.27 |
| W2- | United States; Susan Francia; Erin Cafaro | 7:06.28 | Romania; Camelia Lupașcu; Nicoleta Albu | 7:06.64 | New Zealand; Emma Feathery; Rebecca Scown | 7:06.94 |
| W4- | Netherlands; Chantal Achterberg; Nienke Kingma; Carline Bouw; Femke Dekker | 6:31.34 | United States; Amanda Polk; Jamie Redman; Elle Logan; Esther Lofgren | 6:36.01 | Canada; Sarah Waterfield; Sandra Kisil; Jennifer Tuters; Emma Darling | 6:36.87 |
| W8+ | United States; Erin Cafaro; Mara Allen; Laura Larsen-Strecker; Susan Francia; Anna Goodale; Lindsay Shoop; Caroline Lind; Katherine Glessner; Katelin Snyder | 6:05.34 | Romania; Roxana Cogianu; Ionela Zaharia; Maria Diana Bursuc; Ioana Crăciun; Adelina Cojocariu; Nicoleta Albu; Camelia Lupașcu; Enikő Mironcic; Teodora Stoica | 6:06.94 | Netherlands; Nienke Groen; Claudia Belderbos; Jacobine Veenhoven; Sytske de Groot; Chantal Achterberg; Nienke Kingma; Carline Bouw; Femke Dekker; Anne Schellekens | 6:07.43 |
Women's lightweight events
| LW1x | Switzerland; Pamela Weisshaupt | 7:36.23 | Italy; Laura Milani | 7:37.18 | Denmark; Juliane Rasmussen | 7:37.42 |
| LW2x | Greece; Christina Giazitzidou; Alexandra Tsiavou | 6:51.46 | Poland; Magdalena Kemnitz; Agnieszka Renc | 6:56.65 | Great Britain; Hester Goodsell; Sophie Hosking | 6:56.67 |
| LW4x | Germany; Lena Müller; Helke Nieschlag; Laura Tibitanzl; Julia Kröger | 6:32.91 | Great Britain; Stephanie Cullen; Laura Greenhalgh; Andrea Dennis; Jane Hall | 6:35.42 | United States; Hillary Saeger; Lindsey Hochman; Stefanie Sydlik; Abelyn Broughton | 6:36.88 |

=== Adaptive events ===
Non-Paralympic classes

| Event | Gold | Time | Silver | Time | Bronze | Time |
|---|---|---|---|---|---|---|
| ASM1x | Great Britain; Tom Aggar | 4:51.48 | Ukraine; Andrii Kryvchun | 5:07.37 | Australia; Benjamin Houlison | 5:12.11 |
| ASW1x | Ukraine; Alla Lysenko | 5:25.17 | France; Nathalie Benoit | 5:29.95 | Belarus; Liudmila Vauchok | 5:34.45 |
| TAMix2x | Ukraine; Dmytro Ivanov; Iryna Kyrychenko | 4:03.96 | Brazil; Elton Santana; Josiane Lima | 4:04.80 | Poland; Jolanta Pawlak; Piotr Majka | 4:05.28 |
| LTAID4+ | Hong Kong; Lam King Shan; Chu Pui Man; Szeto Tung Chun; Tsui Kwok Man; Chu Ying Chun | 3:55.70 | Italy; Giorgia Indelicato; Carlo Dal Verme; Francesco Borsani; Elisabetta Tieghi; Mahila Di Battista | 4:31.66 | Not awarded | |
| LTAMix4+ | Great Britain; Vicki Hansford; James Roe; David Smith; Naomi Riches; Rhiannon Jones | 3:25.33 | Italy; Paola Protopapa; Luca Agoletto; Andrea Bozzato; Graziana Saccocci; Alessandro Franzetti | 3:28.44 | Germany; Marcus Klemp; Martin Lossau; Susanne Lackner; Anke Molkenthin; Arne Maury | 3:28.90 |

== Medal table ==
=== Men's and women's events ===
| Place | Nation | 1st place, gold medalist(s) | 2nd place, silver medalist(s) | 3rd place, bronze medalist(s) | Total |
|---|---|---|---|---|---|
| 1 | Germany | 4 | 1 | 3 | 8 |
| 2 | New Zealand | 4 | 0 | 1 | 5 |
| 3 | United States | 3 | 3 | 1 | 7 |
| 4 | Italy | 2 | 2 | 1 | 5 |
| 5 | Poland | 2 | 1 | 1 | 4 |
| 6 | Great Britain | 1 | 5 | 1 | 7 |
| 7 | France | 1 | 2 | 0 | 3 |
| 8 | Greece | 1 | 1 | 1 | 3 |
| 9 | Netherlands | 1 | 0 | 3 | 4 |
| 10 | Belarus | 1 | 0 | 0 | 1 |
| 10 | Switzerland | 1 | 0 | 0 | 1 |
| 10 | Ukraine | 1 | 0 | 0 | 1 |
| 13 | Australia | 0 | 2 | 0 | 2 |
| 13 | Romania | 0 | 2 | 0 | 2 |
| 15 | Denmark | 0 | 1 | 3 | 4 |
| 16 | Czech Republic | 0 | 1 | 2 | 3 |
| 17 | Canada | 0 | 1 | 1 | 2 |
| 18 | Bulgaria | 0 | 0 | 1 | 1 |
| 18 | Estonia | 0 | 0 | 1 | 1 |
| 18 | Slovenia | 0 | 0 | 1 | 1 |
| 18 | Serbia | 0 | 0 | 1 | 1 |
| Total | | 22 | 22 | 22 | 66 |

=== Adaptive events ===
| Place | Nation | 1st place, gold medalist(s) | 2nd place, silver medalist(s) | 3rd place, bronze medalist(s) | Total |
|---|---|---|---|---|---|
| 1 | Ukraine | 2 | 1 | 0 | 3 |
| 2 | Great Britain | 2 | 0 | 0 | 2 |
| 3 | Hong Kong | 1 | 0 | 0 | 1 |
| 4 | Italy | 0 | 2 | 0 | 2 |
| 5 | Brazil | 0 | 1 | 0 | 1 |
| 5 | France | 0 | 1 | 0 | 1 |
| 7 | Australia | 0 | 0 | 1 | 1 |
| 7 | Belarus | 0 | 0 | 1 | 1 |
| 7 | Germany | 0 | 0 | 1 | 1 |
| 7 | Poland | 0 | 0 | 1 | 1 |
| Total | | 5 | 5 | 4 | 14 |
