= Australian Rowing Championships =

The Australian Rowing Championships is an annual rowing event that determines Australia's national rowing champions and facilitates selection of Australian representative crews for World Championships and the Olympic Games. It is Australia's premier regatta, with states, clubs and schools sending their best crews. The Championships commence with the National Regatta - men's, women's and lightweight events in open, under 23, under 19, under 17 and school age events. Rowers at the National Regatta race in their local club colours with composite crews permitted. The Championships conclude with the Interstate Regatta - currently eight events competed by state representative crews or scullers selected by the state rowing associations. The states compete for an overall points tally which decides the Zurich Cup.

== Competition history ==
Inter-colonial racing began in Australia in 1833 when a Sydney crew raced a Hobart crew in whalers. Schools, varsity and club events were the top-class races throughout the mid 19th century although New South Wales and Victoria raced regularly (though not annually) in men's IVs from 1863. In 1878 Victoria and New South Wales commenced inter-colonial racing in eight-oared boats and the other colonies and (later states) joined them such that by 1906 all six Australian states were sending a men's VIII and perhaps a sculler, to the annual Interstate Regatta.

A national open rowing championship was discussed at Australian Rowing Council meetings from 1946 but it wasn't until the 1960s that support for the concept was unanimous outside of New South Wales and Victoria. The first National Open Championship Regatta was held in 1962 and then was held every two years. Since 1969 the National Regatta has been annual and since 1976 has been held within the same single programme as the Interstate Regatta creating the combined Australian Rowing Championships.

== Interstate Regatta ==
The Interstate Regatta is held at the conclusion of the National Regatta and currently includes the following races for state representative crews:

=== The King's Cup - Interstate Men's Eight ===
Australia's blue-ribbon annual rowing race for men. Contested by state representative senior heavyweight men's eights.

=== The President's Cup - Interstate Men's Single Scull ===
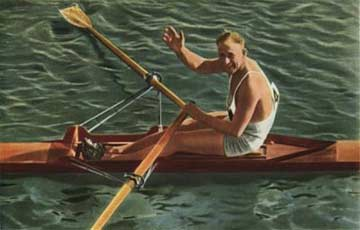
Bobby Pearce, world and Olympic champion

An intercolonial sculling race between New South Wales and Victoria was first held in 1868 and then annually from 1895 with Queensland also racing. Tasmania has consistently been represented since 1903. South Australia and West Australia have entered scullers with some regularity but not consistently until the 1960s.

The first President of the Australian Amateur Rowing Council, Mr E.C. Watchorn, donated the President's Cup in 1925 as the perpetual trophy for the annual Australian Interstate Single Sculling Championship. It was first competed for in 1926 and won by A A Baynes of Queensland.

- Mervyn Wood (NSW) contested the event on nine occasions, won on a record eight occasions, seven of them consecutive 1946 to 1952.
- G Squires (Tasmania) contested the event on eight occasions from 1956 to 1963 winning at his last attempt and finishing second six times.
- Ted Hale (NSW & Tasmania) contested the event on a record twelve occasions and won on six occasions, all consecutive from 1976 to 1981. His NSW colleague Dr. Dick Redell finished 2nd to Hale in '76, '77 & '79 and was 3rd in '78.
- Duncan Free (QLD) contested the event on eight occasions from 1996 to 2004 winning seven times.
- Bobby Pearce (NSW) won on three occasions from 1927 to 1929 and by a 30 length margin in 1928. His cousin Cecil Pearce (NSW) won from 1936 to 1939 (by 8 lengths in 1937). Cecil's son Gary Pearce won in 1965.

=== The Queen Elizabeth II Cup - Interstate Women's Eight ===
The premier interstate event for women was the ULVA trophy which from 1920 till 1998 was a fours event. The trophy had first been presented by the United Licensed Victuallers Association (ULVA) of Queensland. In 1999 the women's interstate race was changed to an event for VIIIs with the Queen's Cup as the prize.

Of the seventy-eight occasions between 1920 and 1999 that the race was held in IVs, New South Wales won thirty-one times with eleven of those victories consecutive between 1955 and 1965. Victoria managed twenty-four victories in that period also with eleven of them consecutive (1978–1988) and then enjoying another eleven year consecutive run from 2005 to 2015. Of the twenty-five events up until 2015, Victoria were the victors on eighteen occasions.

- Kim Crow contested the event for Victoria on nine occasions in the ten years 2007 to 2016 and achieved nine victories.
- Pauline Frasca made eleven appearances for Victoria in the event between from 2003 and 2014 and saw nine victories.
- Robyn Selby Smith contested the event for Victoria on ten occasions between 2002 and 2012 achieving seven victories.
- Alexandra Hagan contested the event on nine consecutive occasions for West Australia between 2008 and 2016.
- Lucy Stephan contested the event on nine consecutive occasions for Victoria from 2012 to 2021 for eight wins.
- Kate Hornsey was seated in every Tasmanian VIII entered in the event between 2003 and 2014 (seven crews entered). She stroked six of those crews.

=== The Penrith Cup - Interstate Men's Lightweight Coxless Four ===
The Penrith Cup for a lightweight men's IV was introduced in 1958.

- Simon Burgess contested the event on ten occasions for Tasmania between 1993 and 2005, eight as stroke. He was victorious on seven consecutive occasions from 1999 to 2005, five of those as stroke.
- Thomas Gibson contested the event on eight occasions for Tasmania between 2004 and 2012. He was victorious six times, four of those as stroke.
- Samuel Beltz contested the event on ten occasions for Tasmania between 2002 and 2014. He was victorious eight times.
- Vaughan Bollen contested the event on eleven occasions - nine times for South Australia, twice for Victoria. He won twice, once for each of those states. Hd had previously coxed four South Australian King's Cup eights.

=== The Nell Slatter Trophy - Interstate Women's Single Scull ===
Since 1963 the interstate women's scull competition has been for the Nell Slatter Trophy.

=== The Victoria Cup - Interstate Women's Lightweight Coxless Quad Scull ===
From 1968 until 1998 the premier women's lightweight interstate event was the Victoria Cup competed for by coxless IVs. Since 1999, lightweight quad sculls have raced for the Cup.

- Alice McNamara raced the event for Victoria on twelve successive occasions from 2006 to 2017. She stroked six of those & saw a 2006 victory.
- Amber Halliday contested the event for South Australia on ten occasions from 1998 to 2008 for six victories.
- Hannah Every-Hall contested the event four times for Victoria and four times for Queensland over a sixteen-year period from 1999 to 2014.
- Bronwen Watson contested the event on nine occasions between 1997 and 2009

=== The Noel Wilkinson Trophy - Interstate Men's Youth Eight ===
Since 1974 men's youth crews have competed at the state representative level for the Noel Wilkinson Cup. Noel Wilkinson (died 1992) OAM was a long serving treasurer of the Australian Rowing Council who had worked tirelessly in fund-raising over many years for Australian national and Olympic squads. He had managed Victorian and national representative crews and was a club stalwart at the Banks Rowing Club in Melbourne from 1930 till his death. The event has been raced over 2000 metres since 1983. In the first thirty-seven years of competition for the title up till 2011, Victoria were the most consistent winners with seventeen wins, followed by New South Wales with ten victories.

=== The Bicentennial Cup - Interstate Women's Youth Eight ===
A women's youth event commenced in 1988 in coxed IVs and converted to VIIIs in 1994.

=== The Zurich Cup - Overall Regatta Points Tally ===
Since 1999 the overall cumulative points winner in the interstate championships is awarded the Zurich Cup. States are awarded points in each interstate event on the following basis: first place, eight points; second place, six points; third place, five points; fourth place, four points; fifth place, three points; sixth place, two points; seventh place, one point.

In the sixteen regattas at which it was presented up till 2014, the Zurich Cup was won on eleven occasions by Victoria, thrice by New South Wales and by Queensland in 2003 and 2014.

- South Australia's Chris Morgan in the twelve-year period 2005 to 2016 raced for his state on nine occasions in the King's Cup and on eight occasions in the President's Cup.

== The National Regatta ==
The National Regatta currently includes a diverse program of club and school events.

=== The Sydney Cup - Schoolgirl Eights ===
The Sydney Cup was first presented in 2005.

Past winners
Year	Winner	2nd	3rd	Time	Margin
2026	Kinross Wolaroi	Melbourne Girls' Grammar	Loreto Toorak	6:52.82	0.62
2025	St Catherine's NSW	Melbourne Girls' Grammar	St Catherine's VIC	6:45.18	2.47
2024	St Catherine's NSW	Pymble Ladies' College	Melbourne Girls Grammar	6:39.07	5.07
2023	Melbourne Girls' Grammar	St Catherine's NSW	St Catherine's VIC	6:44.71	2.34
2022	St Catherine's VIC	Melbourne Girls' Grammar	Wesley College	7:03.73	0.57
2021	Melbourne Girls' Grammar	St Catherine's VIC	Methodist Ladies' College	7:17.77	5.05
2020	*Cancelled*				
2019	Methodist Ladies' College	Pymble Ladies' College	Geelong Grammar	6:53.38	3.14
2018	Pymble Ladies' College	St Catherine's VIC	Methodist Ladies' College	6:55.20	1.77
2017	Walford Anglican	Queenwood	Pymble Ladies' College	6:45.02	2.72
2016	St Catherine's VIC	Loreto Toorak	Queenwood	6:43.76	1.89
2015	Geelong Grammar	Loreto Toorak	Methodist Ladies' College	6:46.46	7.87
2014	Loreto Toorak	Geelong Grammar	Genazzano	6:46.02	4.48
2013	Melbourne Girls' Grammar	Walford Anglican	Methodist Ladies' College	6:43.87	0.26
2012	Melbourne Girls' Grammar	Methodist Ladies' College	Walford Anglican	6:45.87	5.50
2011	Melbourne Girls' Grammar	Pymble Ladies' College	Genazzano	6:44.13	1.58
2010	Loreto Kirribilli	Methodist Ladies' College	Loreto Normanhurst	6:50.77	2.61
2009	Collegiate	Geelong Grammar	St Catherine's VIC	6:46.56	1.51
2008	PLC Sydney	St Catherine's VIC	Pymble Ladies' College	6:51.32	2.19
2007	Methodist Ladies' College	Pymble Ladies' College	PLC Sydney	7:17.91	3.36
2006	Methodist Ladies' College	Pymble Ladies' College	Geelong College	6:34.97	4.47
2005	Pymble Ladies' College	Methodist Ladies' College	Loreto Kirribilli	6:45.77	2.58
2004	Pymble Ladies' College			7:03.39	
2003	Pymble Ladies' College			6:42.87	
2002	Geelong College			6:55.63	
2001	Geelong Grammar			6:30.10	
2000	Pymble Ladies' College			6:51.20	
1999	The Friends' School			6:42.63	
1998	Geelong Grammar			7:07.36	

=== The Barrington Cup - Schoolboy Eights ===
The Barrington Cup was first presented in 1984.

Past winners
Year	Winner	2nd	3rd	Time	Margin
2026	St Ignatius	Scotch College VIC	Melbourne Grammar	5:57.41	2.42
2025	St Ignatius	Shore	The Southport School	5:57.11	4.67
2024	The King's School	The Southport School	St Ignatius	5:56.96	0.04
2023	St Ignatius	Brisbane Boys	St Peter's College	5:57.98	2.84
2022	Melbourne Grammar	Scotch College VIC	Shore	6:12.15	3.00
2021	St Peter's College	Shore	Brisbane Boys	6:28.33	2.94
2020	*Cancelled*				
2019	Scotch College VIC	Brighton Grammar	Nudgee	6:08.81	4.39
2018	Shore	Scotch College VIC	Nudgee	6:02.89	2.93
2017	Scotch College VIC	Shore	Geelong College and Melbourne Grammar (dead heat)	5:51.62	2.97
2016	Shore	St Joseph's Sydney	Scotch College VIC	5:58.56	2.11
2015	Nudgee	St Joseph's Sydney	Melbourne Grammar	5:50.97	2.42
2014	Shore	Scotch College VIC	St Joseph's Sydney	5:52.67	3.26
2013	Scotch College VIC	Shore	Gavirate	5:52.87	1.68
2012	Scotch College VIC	Melbourne Grammar	Christ Church Grammar	6:07.08	3.18
2011	Shore	Hutchins	Scots	5:51.89	1.40
2010	Scotch College VIC	Shore	Scots	5:52.99	2.66
2009	Melbourne Grammar	Shore	Scots	5:49.71	0.82
2008	Scotch College VIC	Melbourne Grammar	Shore	6:00.04	2.60
2007	Shore	The Kings School	Newington	6:22.81	0.06
2006	The King's School	Scotch College VIC	Geelong College	5:40.81	3.66
2005	St Joseph's Sydney	The Kings School	Scotch College VIC	5:58.04	1.03
2004	Shore	St Joseph's	The King's School	6:01.79	
2003	Shore	Canberra Grammar	The King's School	5:57.97	
2002	Shore	Newington	St Ignatius	6:03.65	
2001	The King's School	Sydney Grammar	Friends	5:53.97	
2000	St Joseph's	St Peter's	Shore	5:55.64	
1999	Xavier College	St Peter's	Shore	5:55.38	
1998	Newington	Scotch College VIC	Shore	6:09.91	1.53
1997	Brisbane Grammar	Newington	St Ignatius	6:53.77	
1996	Shore	Newington		6:21.06	
1995	Shore	Sydney Grammar	Newington	5:56.03	
1994	Sydney Grammar			6:17.62	
1993	Brisbane Boys College	Anglican Church Grammar	St Joseph's	6:05.88	

== Locations and events ==
Interstate Men's Championships for VIIIs (Kings Cup) and single sculls (Presidents Cup) were held in the following locations after Federation:

- 1901 Albert Park Lake, Victoria
- 1902 Port River, South Australia
- 1903 Yarra River, Victoria
- 1904 Hamilton Reach, Brisbane River, Queensland
- 1905 Parramatta River, New South Wales
- 1906 Swan River, Western Australia
- 1907 Port River, South Australia
- 1908 Yarra River, Victoria
- 1909 Hamilton Reach, Brisbane River, Queensland
- 1910 River Derwent, Tasmania
- 1911 Parramatta River, New South Wales
- 1912 Swan River, Western Australia
- 1913 Port River, South Australia
- 1914 Yarra River, Victoria
- 1925 Yarra River, Victoria
- 1927 River Derwent, Tasmania
- 1928 Nepean River, Penrith, New South Wales
- 1932 Yarra River, Victoria
- 1933 Brisbane River, Queensland
- 1934 River Derwent, Tasmania
- 1935 Nepean River, Penrith, New South Wales
- 1936 Swan River, Western Australia
- 1937 Murray Bridge, South Australia
- 1938 Yarra River, Victoria
- 1939 Brisbane River, Queensland
- 1946 Nepean River, Penrith, New South Wales
- 1947 Swan River, Western Australia
- 1948 River Derwent, Tasmania
- 1949 Murray Bridge, South Australia
- 1950 Yarra River, Victoria
- 1951 Hamilton Reach, Brisbane River, Queensland
- 1952 Nepean River, Penrith, New South Wales
- 1953 Swan River, Western Australia (with a 2X and 2+ also raced)
- 1954 River Derwent, Tasmania (with a 2X and 2+ also raced)
- 1955 Port River, South Australia (with a 2+ also raced)
- 1956 Lake Wendouree, Victoria
- 1957 Brisbane River, Queensland
- 1958 Nepean River, Penrith, New South Wales

The Penrith Cup for lightweight fours was added to the Kings Cup and Presidents Cup at Interstate Men's Championships for VIIIs as follows:

- 1958 Nepean River, Penrith, New South Wales
- 1959 Swan River, Western Australia
- 1960 Tamar River, Launceston, Tasmania
- 1961 Port River, South Australia
- 1962 Lake Wendouree, Victoria
- 1963 Milton Reach, Brisbane River, Queensland
- 1964 Nepean River, Penrith, New South Wales
- 1965 Canning River, West Australia
- 1966 Huon River, Tasmania
- 1967 Murray Bridge, South Australia
- 1968 Nepean River, Penrith, New South Wales
- 1969 Burnett River, Bundaberg, Queensland
- 1970 Lake Wendouree, Victoria
- 1971 Canning River, West Australia
- 1972 Huon River, Tasmania
- 1973 Murray Bridge, South Australia

An Interstate Women's Race for the ULVA Trophy was held in the following locations:

- 1912 Albert Park Lake, Victoria - crews raced in clinker outrigger IVs with sliding seats.
- 1913 Merthyr Reach Brisbane River, Queensland
- 1925 Albert Park Lake, Victoria
- 1927 Tamar River, Launceston, Tasmania
- 1928 Hen & Chicken Bay, Parramatta River, New South Wales
- 1931 Albert Park Lake, Victoria
- 1932 Brisbane River, Queensland
- 1933 River Derwent, Tasmania
- 1934 Parramatta River, New South Wales
- 1935 Port River, South Australia
- 1936 Yarra River, Victoria
- 1937 Garden Reach, Brisbane River, Queensland
- 1938 Hen & Chicken Bay, Parramatta River, New South Wales
- 1939 River Derwent, Tasmania
- 1940 Port River, South Australia
- 1941 Yarra River, Victoria
- 1949 Town Reach, Brisbane River, Queensland
- 1950 Parramatta River, New South Wales
- 1951 Yarra River, Victoria
- 1952 Town Reach, Brisbane River, Queensland
- 1953 Parramatta River, New South Wales
- 1954 Yarra River, Victoria
- 1955 Milton Reach, Brisbane River, Queensland
- 1956 Parramatta River, New South Wales
- 1957 Town Reach, Brisbane River, Queensland
- 1958 Yarra River, Victoria
- 1959 Parramatta River, New South Wales
- 1960 Town Reach, Brisbane River, Queensland
- 1961 Parramatta River, New South Wales
- 1962 Albert Park Lake, Victoria

With the Nell Slatter Trophy for women's single sculls added to the Women's Interstate Regatta from 1963 and the Victoria Cup added from 1968:

- 1963 Brisbane River, Queensland
- 1964 Parramatta River, New South Wales
- 1965 Albert Park Lake, Victoria
- 1966 Port River, South Australia
- 1967 Parramatta River, New South Wales
- 1968 Yarra River, Victoria
- 1969 Port River, South Australia
- 1970 Milton Reach, Brisbane River, Queensland
- 1971 Nepean River, Penrith, New South Wales
- 1972 Lake Burley Griffen, Canberra, ACT

Interstate Championships with both Men's and Women's events were held in the following locations:

- 1920 Brisbane River, Queensland
- 1921 Tamar River, Launceston, Tasmania
- 1922 Parramatta River, New South Wales
- 1923 Swan River, Western Australia
- 1924 Port River, South Australia
- 1926 Brisbane River, Queensland
- 1929 Swan River, Western Australia
- 1930 Mannum, South Australia

A separate National Regatta was held with distinct dates and venue from the Interstate Championships as follows:

- 1962 Lake Wendouree, Victoria (8 x men's events)
- 1964 Lake Burley Griffin, ACT (9 x men's & boy's events)
- 1966 Lake Wendouree, Victoria (12 x men's & boy's events)
- 1968 Murray Bridge, South Australia (18 events, men's & women's)
- 1969 Port River, South Australia (6 women's events contested)
- 1970 Nepean River, Penrith, New South Wales (22 events, men's & women's)
- 1971 Nepean River, Penrith, New South Wales (6 women's events contested)
- 1972 Lake Kurwongbah, Queensland (men's)
- 1972 Lake Burley Griffin, ACT (women's)

Australian Rowing Championships (combining both regattas) have been held in the following locations

- 1973 Barwon River, Victoria (Women's Nationals & Interstate)
- 1974 Lake Wendouree, Victoria (Men's Nationals & Interstate)
- 1974 Port River, South Australia (Women's Nationals & Interstate)
- 1975 Lake Kurwongbah, Queensland (Men's Nationals & Interstate)
- 1975 Canning River, Western Australia (Women's Nationals & Interstate)
- 1976 Nepean River, Penrith, New South Wales
- 1977 Canning River, Western Australia
- 1978 Huon River, Tasmania
- 1979 West Lakes South Australia
- 1980 Lake Wendouree, Victoria
- 1981 Hinze Dam, Queensland
- 1982 Nepean River, Penrith, New South Wales
- 1983 Canning River, Western Australia
- 1984 Lake Barrington, Tasmania
- 1985 Lake Wendouree, Victoria
- 1986 West Lakes South Australia
- 1987 Lake Barrington, Tasmania
- 1988 Nepean River, Penrith, New South Wales
- 1989 abandoned due to a cyclone, Wellington Dam, Western Australia
- 1990 Lake Barrington, Tasmania
- 1991 West Lakes South Australia
- 1992 Carrum, Victoria
- 1993 Lake Wivenhoe, Queensland
- 1994 Lake Barrington, Tasmania
- 1995 Wellington Dam, Western Australia
- 1996 Sydney International Regatta Centre, New South Wales
- 1997 Lake Barrington, Tasmania
- 1998 Lake Nagambie, Victoria
- 1999 West Lakes, South Australia
- 2000 Sydney International Regatta Centre, New South Wales
- 2001 Lake Wivenhoe, Queensland
- 2002 Lake Nagambie, Victoria
- 2003 Lake Barrington, Tasmania
- 2004 Lake Nagambie, Victoria
- 2005 Sydney International Regatta Centre, New South Wales
- 2006 Lake Barrington, Tasmania
- 2007 Lake Nagambie, Victoria
- 2008 Sydney International Regatta Centre, New South Wales
- 2009 Lake Barrington, Tasmania
- 2010 Lake Nagambie, Victoria
- 2011 West Lakes, South Australia
- 2012 Champion Lakes Regatta Centre, Western Australia
- 2013 Sydney International Regatta Centre, New South Wales
- 2014 Sydney International Regatta Centre, New South Wales
- 2015 Sydney International Regatta Centre, New South Wales
- 2016 Sydney International Regatta Centre, New South Wales
- 2017 Sydney International Regatta Centre, New South Wales
- 2018 Sydney International Regatta Centre, New South Wales
- 2019 Sydney International Regatta Centre, New South Wales
- 2020 Regatta cancelled
- 2021 Lake Barrington, Tasmania
- 2022 Lake Nagambie, Victoria
- 2023 Champion Lakes Regatta Centre, Western Australia
