= 2011 European Rowing Championships =

International rowing event

- Location: Plovdiv, Bulgaria
- Dates: 16–18 September 2011
- Competitors: 389 from 28 nations

The 2011 European Rowing Championships were the fifth edition of the European Rowing Championships, since they were reinstated by decision of FISA in 2006. The event was held in Plovdiv, Bulgaria, between 16 and 18 September 2011. A total of 389 rowers (254 men and 135 women), representing 28 national federations, took part in 14 events – eight events less than those contested in the previous edition.

== Medal summary ==
=== Men ===
| Event | Gold | Time | Silver | Time | Bronze | Time |
|---|---|---|---|---|---|---|
| M2− | Greece (GRE); Nikolaos Goudoulas; Apostolos Goudoulas | 6:31.63 | Italy (ITA); Niccolò Mornati; Lorenzo Carboncini | 6:34.26 | Serbia (SRB); Jovan Popović; Nikola Stojić | 6:43.97 |
| M2x | Lithuania (LTU); Saulius Ritter; Rolandas Maščinskas | 6:23.05 | Serbia (SRB); Marko Marjanović; Dušan Bogičević | 6:24.90 | Russia (RUS); Artyom Kosov; Dmitry Khmylnin | 6:25.87 |
| M4− | Greece (GRE); Stergios Papachristos; Ioannis Tsilis; Georgios Tziallas; Ioannis Christou | 5:58.12 | Belarus (BLR); Vadzim Lialin; Dzianis Mihal; Stanislau Shcharbachenia; Aliaksandr Kazubouski | 6:01.45 | Italy (ITA); Mario Paonessa; Francesco Fossi; Luca Agamennoni; Andrea Palmisano | 6:06.10 |
| M1x | Mindaugas Griškonis (LTU) | 7:02.74 | Falko Nolte (GER) | 7:04.99 | Mario Vekić (CRO) | 7:08.17 |
| LM2x | Italy (ITA); Lorenzo Bertini; Elia Luini | 6:28.83 | Greece (GRE); Eleftherios Konsolas; Panagiotis Magdanis | 6:31.84 | Portugal (POR); Pedro Fraga; Nuno Mendes | 6:34.08 |
| LM4− | Italy (ITA); Daniele Danesin; Andrea Caianiello; Marcello Miani; Martino Goretti | 6:02.68 | Czech Republic (CZE); Jan Vetesnik; Ondrej Vetesnik; Jiri Kopac; Miroslav Vraštil Jr. | 6:05.63 | Serbia (SRB); Nemanja Nešić; Miloš Stanojević; Nenad Babović; Miloš Tomić | 6:08.77 |
| M4x | Russia (RUS); Nikita Morgachyov; Aleksey Svirin; Igor Salov; Sergey Fedorovtsev | 5:45.17 | Estonia (EST); Andrei Jämsä; Allar Raja; Tõnu Endrekson; Kaspar Taimsoo | 5:47.07 | Poland (POL); Konrad Wasielewski; Wiktor Chabel; Kamil Zajkowski; Piotr Licznerski | 5:51.00 |
| M8+ | Poland (POL); Marcin Brzeziński; Rafał Hejmej; Dariusz Radosz; Piotr Hojka; Mikołaj Burda; Piotr Juszcazk; Krystian Aranowski; Michal Szpakowski; Daniel Trojanowski | 5:37.38 | Czech Republic (CZE); Jiří Srna; Kornel Altman; David Szabó; Jan Pilc; Jakub Podrazil; Jakub Koloc; Petr Melichar; Matyáš Klang; Martin Šuma | 5:39.38 | Ukraine (UKR); Anton Kholyaznykov; Viktor Hrebennikov; Ivan Tymko; Artem Moroz; Andriy Pryveda; Valentyn Kletskoy; Oleh Lykov; Sergiy Chykanov; Oleksandr Konovaliuk | 5:39.63 |

=== Women ===
| Event | Gold | Time | Silver | Time | Bronze | Time |
|---|---|---|---|---|---|---|
| W2− | Romania (ROU); Camelia Lupașcu; Nicoleta Albu | 7:29.22 | Belarus (BLR); Yuliya Bichyk; Natallia Helakh | 7:31.50 | Italy (ITA); Claudia Wurzel; Sara Bertolasi | 7:37.79 |
| W2x | Ukraine (UKR); Anastasiya Kozhenkova; Yana Dementyeva | 7:06.17 | Serbia (SRB); Iva Obradović; Ivana Filipović | 7:08.27 | Czech Republic (CZE); Lenka Antošová; Jitka Antosova | 7:11.31 |
| W1x | Miroslava Knapková (CZE) | 7:52.03 | Yuliya Levina (RUS) | 7:58.37 | Donata Vištartaitė (LTU) | 8:02.46 |
| LW2x | Greece (GRE); Christina Giazitzidou; Alexandra Tsiavou | 7:15.50 | Great Britain (GBR); Kathryn Twyman; Andrea Dennis | 7:20.26 | Italy (ITA); Laura Milani; Enrica Marasca | 7:24.88 |
| W4x | Ukraine (UKR); Svitlana Spiriukhova; Nataliia Huba; Tetiana Kolesnikova; Kateryna Tarasenko | 6:32.75 | Poland (POL); Agnieszka Kobus; Karolina Gniadek; Sylwia Lewandowska; Natalia Madaj | 6:35.30 | Romania (ROU); Cristina Ilie; Ioana Crăciun; Camelia Lupașcu; Nicoleta Albu | 6:41.61 |
| W8+ | Romania (ROU); Maria Diana Bursuc; Ionelia Zaharia; Cristina Grigoraș; Irina Dorneanu; Adelina Cojocariu; Andreea Boghian; Roxana Cogianu; Eniko Mironcic; Teodora Gidoiu | 6:14.98 | Belarus (BLR); Katsiaryna Shliupskaya; Marharyta Krechka; Volha Berazniova; Natallia Helakh; Hanna Nakhayeva; Tatsiana Kukhta; Yuliya Bichyk; Anastasiya Fadzeyenka; Yaroslava Pavlovich | 6:20.52 | Ukraine (UKR); Oksana Golub; Ganna Gutsalenko; Olha Hurkovska; Nina Proskura; Olena Buryak; Svitlana Novichenko; Liubov Stashko; Anna Kontseva; Anna Gaidukova | 6:23.82 |

== Medal table ==
| Rank | Nation | Gold | Silver | Bronze | Total |
|---|---|---|---|---|---|
| 1 | Greece (GRE) | 3 | 1 | 0 | 4 |
| 2 | Italy (ITA) | 2 | 1 | 3 | 6 |
| 3 | Ukraine (UKR) | 2 | 0 | 2 | 4 |
| 4 | Lithuania (LTU) | 2 | 0 | 1 | 3 |
| 4 | Romania (ROU) | 2 | 0 | 1 | 3 |
| 6 | Czech Republic (CZE) | 1 | 2 | 1 | 4 |
| 7 | Poland (POL) | 1 | 1 | 1 | 3 |
| 7 | Russia (RUS) | 1 | 1 | 1 | 3 |
| 9 | Belarus (BLR) | 0 | 3 | 0 | 3 |
| 10 | Serbia (SRB) | 0 | 2 | 2 | 4 |
| 11 | Estonia (EST) | 0 | 1 | 0 | 1 |
| 11 | Germany (GER) | 0 | 1 | 0 | 1 |
| 11 | Great Britain (GBR) | 0 | 1 | 0 | 1 |
| 14 | Croatia (CRO) | 0 | 0 | 1 | 1 |
| 14 | Portugal (POR) | 0 | 0 | 1 | 1 |
| Totals (15 entries) | | 14 | 14 | 14 | 42 |
