= Oleksandr Konovaliuk =

Ukrainian rower

Personal information
- Born: 1 May 1978 (age 48) Kherson, Ukrainian SSR, Soviet Union

Sport
- Sport: Rowing

Oleksandr Volodymyrovych Konovaliuk (born 1 May 1978) is a Ukrainian rower. He competed in the Men's eight event at the 2012 Summer Olympics.

== Biography ==
Oleksandr Konovaliuk was born on May 1, 1978 in the city of Nova Kakhovka, Kherson region, Ukrainian SSR.

He began rowing in 1992 and three years later he joined the Ukrainian national team competing in the Junior World Championships in Poznan, where he took sixth place in the eights.

Since 2007, he has been performing as a helmsman at the adult level. Especially that season he distinguished himself by performing at the World Championships in Munich and the European Championships in Poznan.

In 2008 he took part in the European Championship in Athens.

In 2009, he competed in the World Championships in Poznan and the European Championships in Brest, where he won a silver medal in the eights, losing in the finals only to the crew from Poland.

At the 2010 European Championship in Montemor-o-Velho he won the bronze in the eights, behind the teams from Germany and Poland. In the same year, he failed to make it into the medalists at the World Championship in Carapiro, limiting himself to the final B.

In 2011, in the same discipline, he won bronze at the European Championships in Plovdiv and competed at the World Championships in Bled.

Thanks to a series of successful performances, he earned the right to compete at the 2012 Summer Olympics in London - as part of a team that also included rowers Anton Kholyaznykov, Viktor Hrebennikov, Ivan Tymko, Artem Moroz, Andriy Pryveda, Valentyn Kletskoy, Oleh Lykov and Serhiy Chykanov. He qualified in the eights for the consolation final B and finished eighth in the final competition protocol.

After the London Olympics, Konovaliuk remained in the main lineup of the Ukrainian national team and continued to take part in major international regattas. Thus, he participated in the European Championships in 2013, 2014, 2015, 2016 and 2017, and in 2016 and 2017 he also competed in the World Championships, although he did not reach the podium or the main finals in any of these competitions.
