= Martin Sauer (rowing) =

German rower (born 1982)

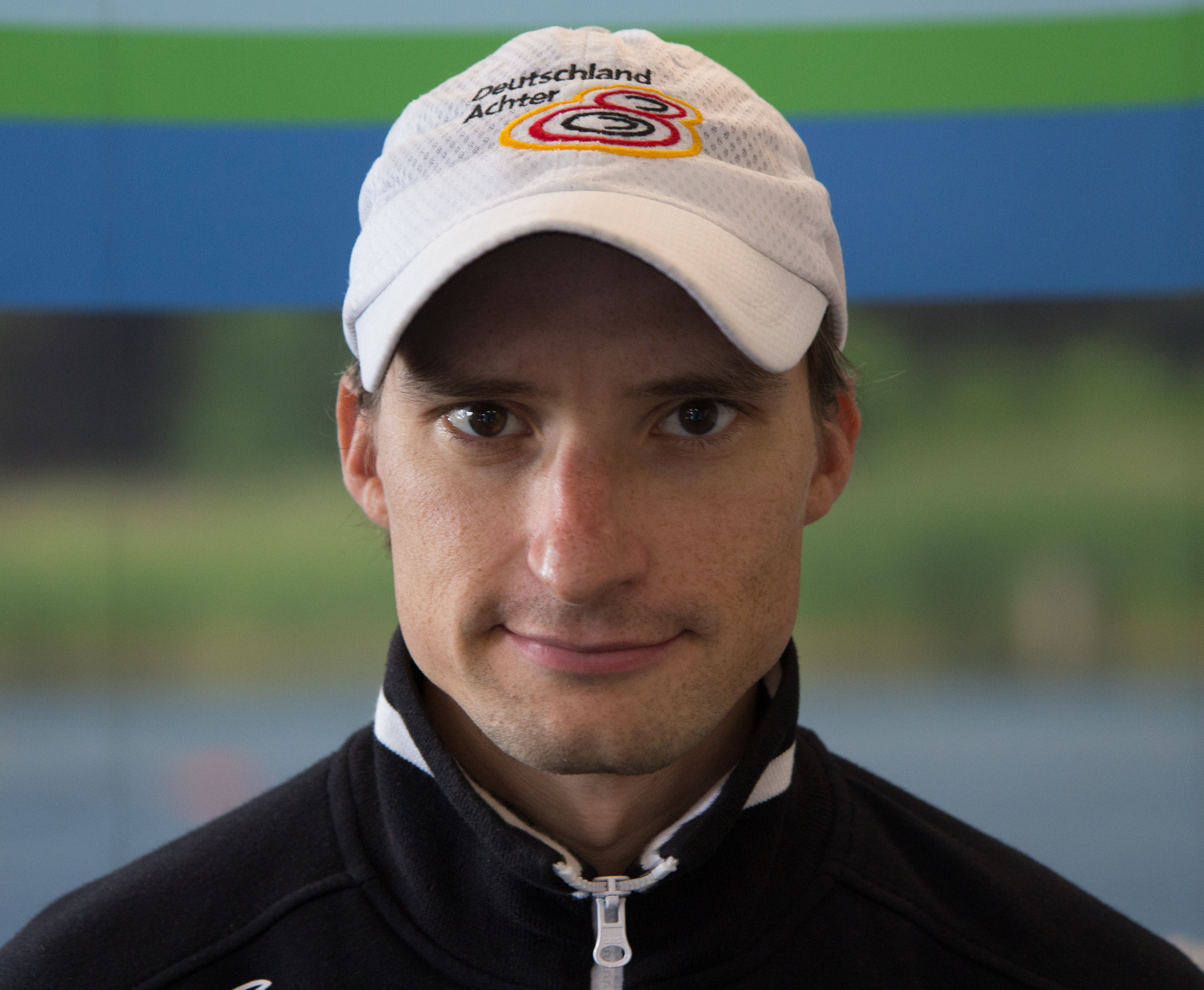
- Sauer in 2017

Personal information
- Nationality: German
- Born: 17 December 1982 (age 43) Wriezen, Bezirk Frankfurt, East Germany
- Height: 1.68 m (5 ft 6 in)
- Weight: 55 kg (121 lb)

Sport
- Country: Germany
- Sport: Rowing
- Event(s): Coxed four, Eight
- Club: Berliner RC
Medal record
Men's rowing
Representing Germany
Olympic Games
Gold medal – first place	2012 London	Eight
Silver medal – second place	2016 Rio de Janeiro	Eight
Silver medal – second place	2020 Tokyo	Eight
World Championships
Gold medal – first place	2006 Eton	Coxed four
Gold medal – first place	2009 Poznań	Eight
Gold medal – first place	2010 Lake Karapiro	Eight
Gold medal – first place	2011 Bled	Eight
Gold medal – first place	2012 Plovdiv	Lwt eight
Gold medal – first place	2017 Sarasota	Eight
Gold medal – first place	2018 Plovdiv	Eight
Gold medal – first place	2019 Ottensheim	Eight
Silver medal – second place	2008 Linz	Lwt eight
Silver medal – second place	2013 Chungju	Eight
Silver medal – second place	2014 Amsterdam	Eight
Silver medal – second place	2015 Aiguebelette	Eight
Bronze medal – third place	2005 Gifu	Coxed four
Bronze medal – third place	2007 Munich	Coxed four
European Championships
Gold medal – first place	2010 Montemor-o-Velho	Eight
Gold medal – first place	2013 Seville	Eight
Gold medal – first place	2014 Belgrade	Eight
Gold medal – first place	2015 Poznań	Eight
Gold medal – first place	2016 Brandenburg	Eight
Gold medal – first place	2017 Račice	Eight
Gold medal – first place	2018 Glasgow	Eight
Gold medal – first place	2019 Lucerne	Eight
World Championships (U23)
Gold medal – first place	2003 Belgrade	Coxed four
Gold medal – first place	2004 Poznań	Eight
Silver medal – second place	2001 Linz	Coxed four
World Championships (junior)
Gold medal – first place	2000 Zagreb	Eight

Martin Sauer (born 17 December 1982) is a German former representative rowing coxswain. He was an eight-time world champion at the senior level and three-time underage world champion. He is a triple Olympian and a triple Olympic medallist. He held his seat as coxswain of the German senior men's eight — the Deutschlandachter — constantly from 2009 to 2021 and steered that crew to their six world championship titles and also when at the 2017 World Rowing Cup II they set a world's best time of 5.18.68, which still the standing world mark as of 2021.

He coxed the German crew which won the gold medal in the men's eight competition at the 2012 Summer Olympics in London. At the 2016 Summer Olympics in Rio de Janeiro, he steered Germany's men's eight to their silver medal win. He was selected in the German Olympic rowing squad for Tokyo 2021 and coxed the men's eight for his third Olympic appearance and his second Olympic silver medal.

== Early career ==
Sauer was born in 1982 in Wriezen. His club rowing has been from the Berliner RuderClub in Berlin.

== Representative rowing career ==
Sauer's international representative debut was at the junior level, when he won a gold medal in the German junior men's eight at the World Rowing Junior Championships in 2000 in Zagreb. He moved in to the German lightweight men's eight for the 2001 season and they finished in overall ninth place at the 2001 World Rowing Championships. For the next tree years he represented at the U23 level. The Nations Cup in 2002 and 2003 were the then-equivalent of the U23 World Championships and Sauer was in the stern of German coxed fours which finished fifth in 2002 and took gold in 2003. At the first true World Rowing U23 Championships in Poznan in 2004 Sauer steered the German men's U23 eight to a gold medal win.

Sauer stepped into the German senior squad in 2005 and took a coxed four to Japan for the 2005 World Rowing Championships where they placed third. The next year at the 2006 World Rowing Championships on Eton Dorney, they won gold and Sauer's first world championship title. At the 2007 World Rowing Championships with Sauer at the helm the coxed four won a bronze medal and the in 2008 Sauer coxed the men's lightweight eight to a World Championship silver medal.

The 2008 Beijing Olympics saw the retirement of Peter Thiede who had been at the helm of the German men's eight since re-unification and was the East German men's eight coxswain from 1987. Sauer steered the eight at the 2008 European Championships and then from 2009 made the stern seat his own in the new Olympiad's rebuilt Deutschlandachter. They won gold and Sauer's second World Championship title at the 2009 World Rowing Championships. In 2010 the eight was undefeated in finals during the international season and then at 2010 World Championships in New Zealand they defended their World Championship title. With Sauer on the rudder, the German crew won their third consecutive title at the 2011 World Championships after again winning all races they contested at three Rowing World Cups. At the 2012 Olympics in London, the favoured German eight won the gold medal with a crew consisting of Filip Adamski, Andreas Kuffner, Eric Johannesen, Maximilian Reinelt, Richard Schmidt, Lukas Müller, Florian Mennigen, Kristof Wilke and Sauer. Later that year each member of the crew was awarded the Silbernes Lorbeerblatt (Silver Laurel Leaf), Germany's highest sports award, for the achievement.

After his first Olympic success, Sauer remained constant in the German eight who since 2010 have been strong, permanent rivals against the British men's eight. From 2013 to 2015, the German team won gold each year at the European Rowing Championships but come the World Championship finals, the Great Britain pipped them each time by a margin of less than one second relegating the German eight to three consecutive silver medals. In the lead-up to Rio 2016 Germany again finished either first or second at each regatta in the international season. In Rio the German crew won their heat but in the final were again beaten by Great Britain with a 1.33 second margin. Sauer now had his second Olympic medal – a silver and later that year he received a second Silbernes Lorbeerblatt (Silver Laurel Leaf), Germany's highest sports award.

In 2017 Sauer, Malte Jakschik, Richard Schmidt, and stroke Hannes Ocik were the only members of the German Olympic eight who rowed on. The eight was rebuilt around this stern end brains-trust. Sauer drove them through their dominant season campaign, winning gold at the European Championships, two World Rowing Cups and ultimately at the 2017 World Rowing Championships in Sarasota, Florida where the German eight were once again crowned world champions. In June 2017 at the World Rowing Cup II in Poznan they set a new world's best time for the eight, taking 0.67 seconds off a 2012 mark that had been set by Canada. The German crew with every man holding the same seat, continued their European and world dominance throughout 2018 winning at three World Rowing Cups, the 2018 European Championships and then defending their world title at the 2018 World Rowing Championships in Plovdiv. There were a handful of changes to the eight in 2019 but Sauer remained in the stern for another successful international season culminating in his sixth world championship title at the 2019 World Rowing Championships in Ottensheim.

The German men's eight's 2019 performances qualified that boat for Tokyo 2020. By the time of the 2021 selections for those delayed Olympics, Sauer was still in the crew and made his third Olympic rowing appearance for another silver medal win.

== Rowing palmares ==
- 2000: Eighth place World Rowing Junior Championships – M8+
- 2001: Silver medal World Rowing U23 Championships – M4+
- 2002: Fifth place World Rowing U23 Championships – M4+
- 2003: Gold medal World Rowing U23 Championships – M4+
- 2004: Gold medal World Rowing U23 Championships – M8+
- 2005: Bronze medal World Rowing Championships – M4+
- 2006: Gold medal World Rowing Championships – M4+
- 2007: Bronze medal World Rowing Championships – M4+
- 2008: Silver medal World Rowing Championships – LM8+
- 2008: 4th place European Rowing Championships – M8+
- 2009: Gold medal World Rowing Championships – M8+
- 2010: Gold medal European and World Rowing Championships – M8+
- 2011: Gold medal World Rowing Championships – M8+
- 2012: Gold medal London Olympics – M8+
- 2013: Gold medal European Rowing Championships – M8+
- 2013: Silver medal World Rowing Championships – M8+
- 2014: Gold medal European Rowing Championships – M8+
- 2014: Silver medal World Rowing Championships – M8+
- 2015: Gold medal European Rowing Championships – M8+
- 2015: Silver medal World Rowing Championships – M8+
- 2016: Silver medal Rio de Janeiro Olympics – M8+
- 2017: Gold medal European and World Rowing Championships – M8+
- 2018: Gold medal European and World Rowing Championships – M8+
- 2019: Gold medal European and World Rowing Championships – M8+
