= Richard Schmidt (rower) =

German rower

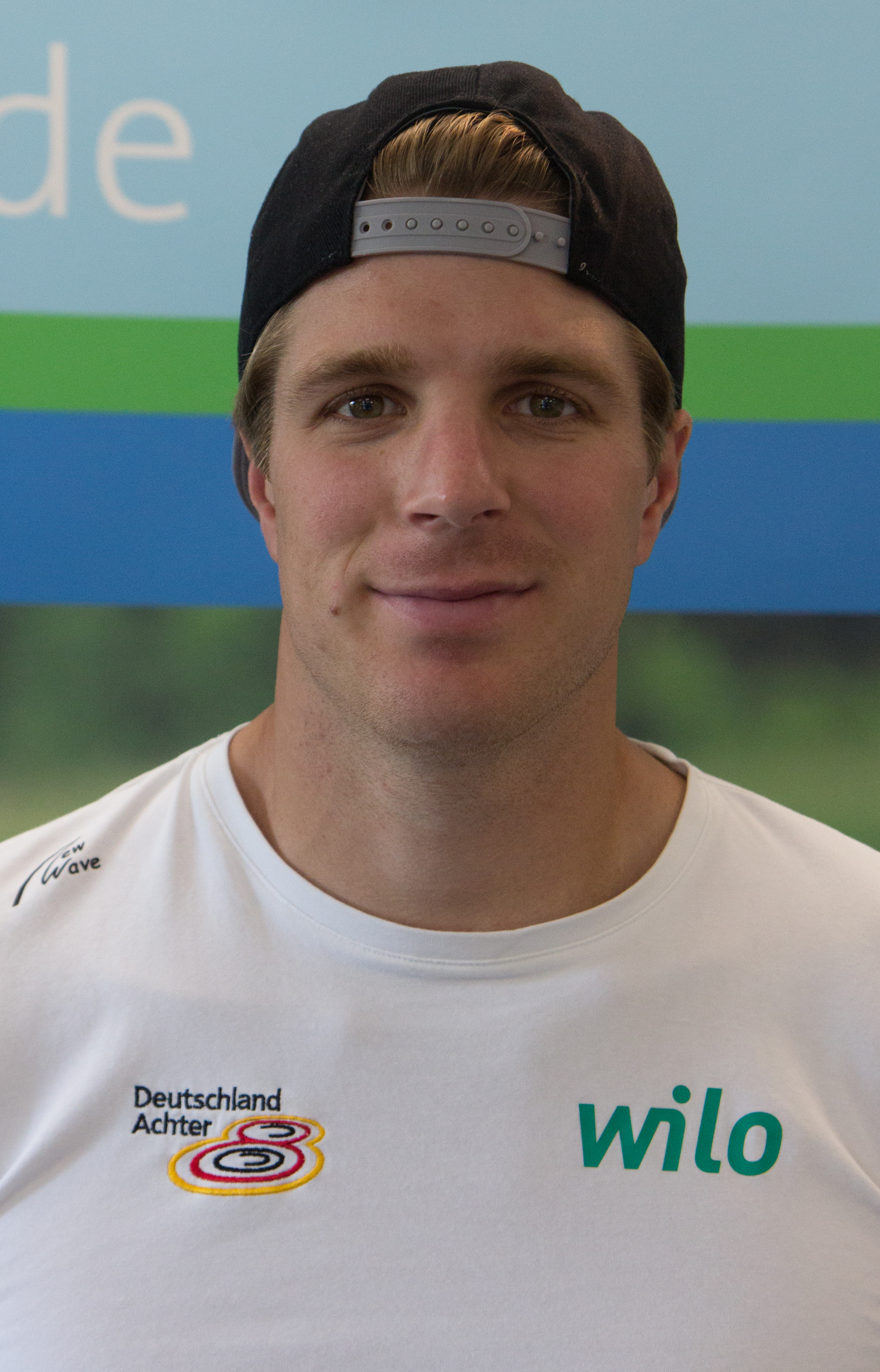
- Schmidt in 2017

Personal information
- Nationality: German
- Born: 23 May 1987 (age 39) Trier, West Germany
- Height: 1.86 m (6 ft 1 in)
- Weight: 74 kg (163 lb)

Sport
- Country: Germany
- Sport: Rowing
- Events: Coxless four, Eight
- Club: Ruderverein 'Treviris 1921' e.V. Trier
Medal record
Men's rowing
Representing Germany
Olympic Games
Gold medal – first place	2012 London	Eight
Silver medal – second place	2016 Rio de Janeiro	Eight
Silver medal – second place	2020 Tokyo	Eight
World Championships
Gold medal – first place	2009 Poznań	Eight
Gold medal – first place	2010 Karapiro	Eight
Gold medal – first place	2011 Bled	Eight
Gold medal – first place	2017 Sarasota	Eight
Gold medal – first place	2018 Plovdiv	Eight
Gold medal – first place	2019 Ottensheim	Eight
Silver medal – second place	2013 Chungju	Eight
Silver medal – second place	2014 Amsterdam	Eight
Silver medal – second place	2015 Aiguebelette	Eight
European Championships
Gold medal – first place	2010 Montemor-o-Velho	Eight
Gold medal – first place	2013 Seville	Eight
Gold medal – first place	2014 Belgrade	Eight
Gold medal – first place	2015 Poznań	Eight
Gold medal – first place	2016 Brandenburg	Eight
Gold medal – first place	2017 Račice	Eight
Gold medal – first place	2018 Glasgow	Eight
Gold medal – first place	2019 Lucerne	Eight
Silver medal – second place	2007 Poznań	Coxless four

Richard Schmidt (born 23 May 1987) is a German former representative sweep-oar rower. He is a six time world champion, a four time Olympian, an Olympic gold & silver medallist and held a seat in the German senior men's eight — the Deutschlandachter — constantly from 2009 to 2021. He rowed at seven when the Deutschlandachter at the 2017 World Rowing Cup II set a world's best time of 5.18.68, which was still the standing world mark as of 2023.

He was in the German crew when it won the gold medal in the men's eight competition at the 2012 Summer Olympics in London. At the 2016 Summer Olympics in Rio de Janeiro, he rowed in Germany's men's eight which won the silver medal and again he rowed in the German men's eight at Tokyo 2021 and won his second Olympic silver medal. In 2024, he received the Thomas Keller Medal, the highest honor awarded by the World Rowing Federation.

== Representative rowing career ==
Schmidt's club rowing was from Ruderverein Treviris 1921 in Trier, Germany. His international representative debut was at the junior level, when he won consecutive medals in the German coxless four at the World Rowing Junior Championships in 2004 and 2005. In 2007, he raced at the World Rowing U23 Championships in Glasgow in a coxless four with Sebastian Schmidt, Fokke Beckmann and Kristof Wilke where they won a gold medal. In Autumn 2007, that crew finished in second place at the European Rowing Championships in Poznań after taking a long break from the sport.

In 2008, Schmidt rowed with Beckmann at the World Cup opener in Munich in the coxless pair and at the end of the season was selected in the German eight for the U23 World Championships, where they placed fourth. During this time, the seating of the German men's eight was reorganised prior to the 2008 Olympic Games, Schmidt was selected as a travelling reserve for Beijing. He raced in the semi-finals with Marco Neumann, Gregor Hauffe, and Urs Käufer in the coxless four as Filip Adamski and Toni Seifert were ill. The newly composed team had surprisingly reached the final, however Neumann was then replaced with Jochen Urban. The boat finished in sixth place.

In the new Olympiad, the coxless four formed the core of the re-built German eight, in which Schmidt then won his first World Championship title at the 2009 World Rowing Championships. In 2010 at the World Rowing Cup I he rowed in a coxless pair with Kristof Wilke but within a month he secured his seat in the German eight rowing in the European Championships in September and then at World Championships where they defended their World Championship title. With Schmidt solid in the five seat, the German crew won their third consecutive title at the 2011 World Championships. At the 2012 Olympics in London, the favoured German eight won the gold medal with a crew consisting of Filip Adamski, Andreas Kuffner, Eric Johannesen, Maximilian Reinelt, Richard Schmidt, Lukas Müller, Florian Mennigen, Kristof Wilke and coxswain Martin Sauer.

After his first Olympic success, Richard Schmidt rowed on and remained constant in the German eight who since 2010 have been strong, permanent rivals against the British men's eight. From 2013 to 2015, the German team won gold each year at the European Rowing Championships but come the World Championship finals, the Great Britain pipped them each time by a margin of less than one second relegating the German eight to three consecutive silver medals. In the lead-up to Rio 2016 Germany again finished either first or second at each regatta in the international season. In Rio the German crew won their heat but in the final were again beaten by Great Britain with a 1.33 second margin. Schmidt now had his second Olympic medal – a silver.

In 2017 Schmidt, Malte Jakschik, the stroke Hannes Ocik and coxswain Martin Sauer were the only members of the German Olympic eight who rowed on. The eight was rebuilt around the stern three of Ocik, Schmidt & Jakschik. He remained throughout their dominant season campaign, winning gold at the European Championships, two World Rowing Cups and ultimately at the 2017 World Rowing Championships in Sarasota, Florida where the German eight were again crowned as world champions. In June 2017 at the World Rowing Cup II in Poznan they set a new world's best time for the eight, taking 0.67 seconds off a 2012 mark set by Canada. The German crew with every man holding the same seat, continued their European and world dominance throughout 2018 winning at three World Rowing Cups, the 2018 European Championships and then defending their world title at the 2018 World Rowing Championships in Plovdiv. There were a handful of changes to the German eight in 2019 but Schmidt remained at seven for another successful international season culminating in his sixth world championship title at the 2019 World Rowing Championships in Ottensheim.

The German men's eight's 2019 performances qualified that boat for Tokyo 2020. By the time of the 2021 selections for those delayed Olympics, Schmidt was still in the crew and set to make his third Olympic rowing appearance. At that Tokyo 2021 Olympic regatta he rowed in his final international appearance for Germany to an Olympic silver medal.

== Personal life ==
Schmidt studied engineering and undertook his PhD in engineering. For his Olympic medal achievements he has twice been awarded the Silver Laurel Leaf by German Federal President Joachim Gauck. Since 2019 he has been an athlete representative on the World Anti-Doping Agency's Athlete Committee.

== Rowing palmares ==
- 2004: Bronze medal World Rowing Junior Championships – M4-
- 2005: Silver medal World Rowing Junior Championships – M4-
- 2007: Gold medal World Rowing U23 Championships – M4-
- 2007: Silver medal European Rowing Championships – M4-
- 2008: 4th place World Rowing U23 Championships – M8+
- 2008: 4th place European Rowing Championships – M8+
- 2008: 6th place Beijing Olympics – M4-
- 2009: Gold medal World Rowing Championships – M8+
- 2010: Gold medal European and World Rowing Championships – M8+
- 2011: Gold medal World Rowing Championships – M8+
- 2012: Gold medal London Olympics – M8+
- 2013: Gold medal European Rowing Championships – M8+
- 2013: Silver medal World Rowing Championships – M8+
- 2014: Gold medal European Rowing Championships – M8+
- 2014: Silver medal World Rowing Championships – M8+
- 2015: Gold medal European Rowing Championships – M8+
- 2015: Silver medal World Rowing Championships – M8+
- 2016: Silver medal Rio de Janeiro Olympics – M8+
- 2017: Gold medal European and World Rowing Championships – M8+
- 2018: Gold medal European and World Rowing Championships – M8+
- 2019: Gold medal European and World Rowing Championships – M8+
