= Rowing at the 2012 Summer Olympics – Men's eight =

Men's eight at the Games of the XXX Olympiad
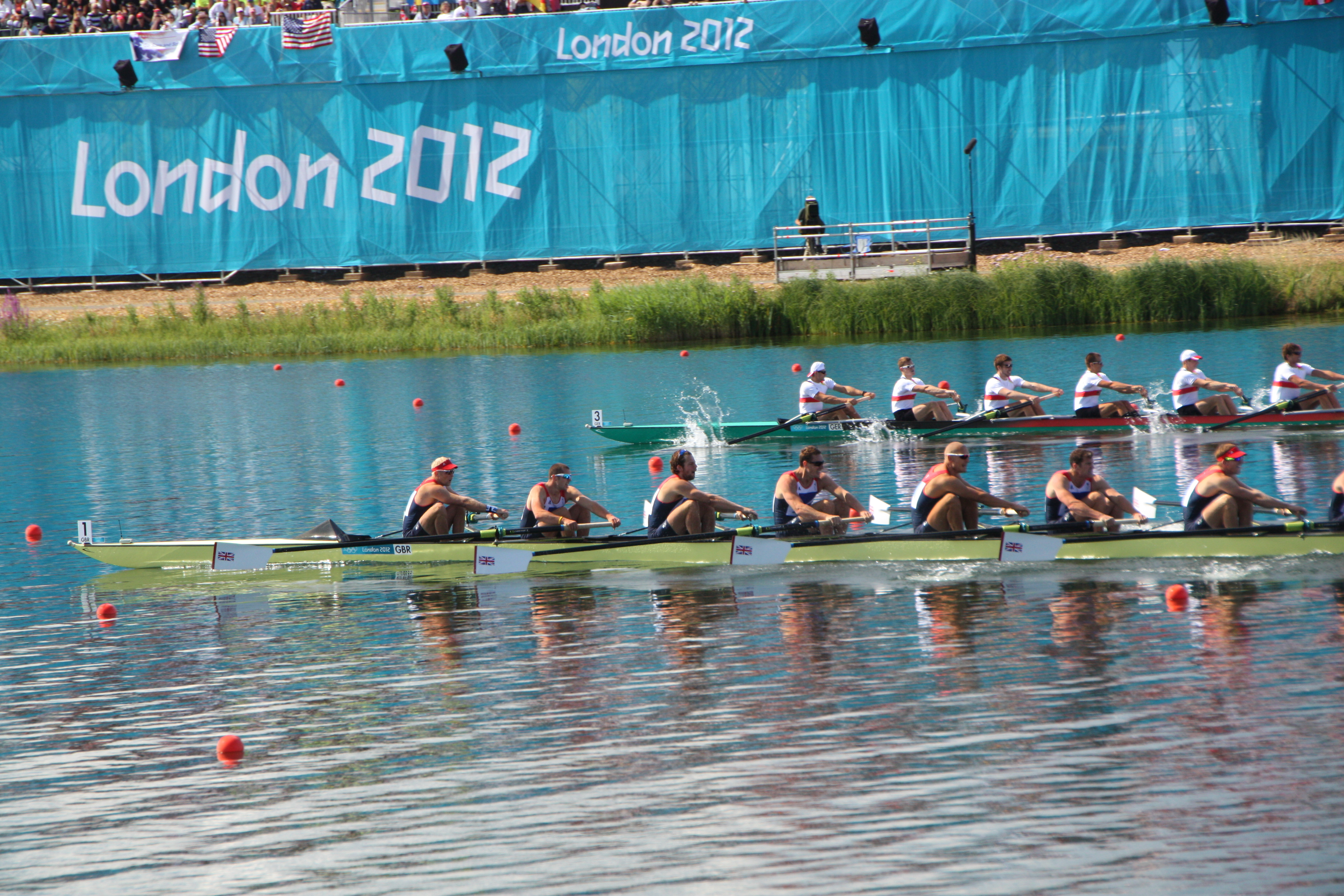
- German and British boats competing in the men's eight
- Venue: Dorney Lake
- Dates: 28 July – 1 August 2012
- Competitors: 72 from 8 nations
- Winning time: 5:48.75

Medalists
1st place, gold medalist(s)		Germany: Filip Adamski; Andreas Kuffner; Eric Johannesen; Maximilian Reinelt; Richard Schmidt; Lukas Müller; Florian Mennigen; Kristof Wilke; Martin Sauer
2nd place, silver medalist(s)		Canada: Gabriel Bergen; Douglas Csima; Robert Gibson; Conlin McCabe; Malcolm Howard; Andrew Byrnes; Jeremiah Brown; Will Crothers; Brian Price
3rd place, bronze medalist(s)		Great Britain: Alex Partridge; James Foad; Tom Ransley; Richard Egington; Moe Sbihi; Greg Searle; Matt Langridge; Constantine Louloudis; Phelan Hill

The men's eight competition at the 2012 Summer Olympics in London took place at Dorney Lake which, for the purposes of the Games venue, was officially termed Eton Dorney. It was held from 28 July to 1 August. There were 8 boats (72 competitors) from 8 nations. The event was won by Germany, the nation's first victory as "Germany" (the United Team of Germany, East Germany, and West Germany had combined for 5 gold medals). The German team beat the defending champions Canada, who took silver. Great Britain also slipped one place from their 2008 silver, taking bronze this time.

== Background ==
This was the 26th appearance of the event. Rowing had been on the programme in 1896 but was cancelled due to bad weather. The men's eight has been held every time that rowing has been contested, beginning in 1900.

Germany was favoured; after a disappointing performance at Beijing (finishing outside the main final), the Germans had taken three straight World Championships. Other contenders included the defending champions (Canada) and the hosts, Great Britain.

For the third consecutive Games, no nations made their debut in the event. Seven of the eight teams had competed in all three of those Games, at least; by contrast, Ukraine made its first appearance since 1996. The United States made its 23rd appearance, most among nations to that point.

== Qualification ==
Nations had been limited to one boat each since 1920. The 8 qualifiers were:

- 7 boats from the 2011 World Championships
- 1 boat from the Final Qualification Regatta

== Competition format ==
The "eight" event featured nine-person boats, with eight rowers and a coxswain. It was a sweep rowing event, with the rowers each having one oar (and thus each rowing on one side). The course used the 2000 metres distance that became the Olympic standard in 1912 (with the exception of 1948). Races were held in up to six lanes.

The competition consisted of two main rounds (semifinals and finals) as well as a repechage.

- Semifinals: Two heats of four boats each. The top boat in each heat (2 boats total) advanced directly to the "A" final, while all other boats (6 total) went to the repechage.
- Repechage: A single heat of six boats. The top four boats rejoined the semifinal winners in the "A" final, with the 5th and 6th place boats eliminated from medal contention and competing in the "B" final.
- Finals: The "A" final consisted of the top six boats, awarding medals and 4th through 6th place. The "B" final featured the next two boats, ranking them 7th and 8th.

== Schedule ==
All times are British Summer Time (UTC+1)

Date	Time	Round
Saturday, 28 July 2012	10:10	Semifinals
Monday, 30 July 2012	9:50	Repechage
Wednesday, 1 August 2012	10:30; 12:30	Final B Final A

== Results ==
=== Semifinals ===
The winners of each heat qualified to the "A" final, while the remainder went to the repechage.

==== Semifinal 1 ====
Rank	Rowers	Coxswain	Nation	Time	Notes
1	David Banks; Grant James; Ross James; Will Miller; Giuseppe Lanzone; Stephen Kasprzyk; Jacob Cornelius; Brett Newlin	Zachary Vlahos	United States	5:30.72	QA
2	Samuel Loch; Francis Hegerty; Cameron McKenzie-McHarg; Bryn Coudraye; Thomas Swann; Joshua Booth; Matt Ryan; Nicholas Purnell	Tobias Lister	Australia	5:32.43	R
3	Marcin Brzeziński; Piotr Juszczak; Mikołaj Burda; Piotr Hojka; Zbigniew Schodowski; Michał Szpakowski; Krystian Aranowski; Rafał Hejmej	Daniel Trojanowski	Poland	5:35.64	R
4	Anton Kholyaznykov; Viktor Grebennykov; Ivan Tymko; Artem Moroz; Andriy Pryveda; Valentyn Kletskoy; Oleh Lykov; Sergii Chykanov	Oleksandr Konovaliuk	Ukraine	5:38.02	R

==== Semifinal 2 ====
Rank	Rowers	Coxswain	Nation	Time	Notes
1	Filip Adamski; Andreas Kuffner; Eric Johannesen; Maximilian Reinelt; Richard Schmidt; Lukas Müller; Florian Mennigen; Kristof Wilke	Martin Sauer	Germany	5:25.52	QA
2	Alex Partridge; James Foad; Tom Ransley; Richard Egington; Moe Sbihi; Greg Searle; Matt Langridge; Constantine Louloudis	Phelan Hill	Great Britain	5:27.61	R
3	Sjoerd Hamburger; Diederik Simon; Rogier Blink; Matthijs Vellenga; Roel Braas; Jozef Klaassen; Olivier Siegelaar; Mitchel Steenman	Peter Wiersum	Netherlands	5:28.99	R
4	Gabriel Bergen; Douglas Csima; Robert Gibson; Conlin McCabe; Malcolm Howard; Andrew Byrnes; Jeremiah Brown; Will Crothers	Brian Price	Canada	5:37.91	R

=== Repechage ===
The first four qualified for the "A" final.

Rank	Rowers	Coxswain	Nation	Time	Notes
1	Alex Partridge; James Foad; Tom Ransley; Richard Egington; Moe Sbihi; Greg Searle; Matt Langridge; Constantine Louloudis	Phelan Hill	Great Britain	5:26.85	QA
2	Gabriel Bergen; Douglas Csima; Robert Gibson; Conlin McCabe; Malcolm Howard; Andrew Byrnes; Jeremiah Brown; Will Crothers	Brian Price	Canada	5:27.41	QA
3	Sjoerd Hamburger; Diederik Simon; Rogier Blink; Matthijs Vellenga; Roel Braas; Jozef Klaassen; Olivier Siegelaar; Mitchel Steenman	Peter Wiersum	Netherlands	5:27.98	QA
4	Samuel Loch; Francis Hegerty; Cameron McKenzie-McHarg; Bryn Coudraye; Thomas Swann; Joshua Booth; Matt Ryan; Nicholas Purnell	Tobias Lister	Australia	5:28.67	QA
5	Marcin Brzeziński; Piotr Juszczak; Mikołaj Burda; Piotr Hojka; Zbigniew Schodowski; Michał Szpakowski; Krystian Aranowski; Rafał Hejmej	Daniel Trojanowski	Poland	5:30.34	QB
6	Anton Kholyaznykov; Viktor Grebennykov; Ivan Tymko; Artem Moroz; Andriy Pryveda; Valentyn Kletskoy; Oleh Lykov; Sergii Chykanov	Oleksandr Konovaliuk	Ukraine	5:42.19	QB

=== Finals ===
==== Final B ====
Rank	Rowers	Coxswain	Nation	Time
7	Marcin Brzeziński; Piotr Juszczak; Mikołaj Burda; Piotr Hojka; Zbigniew Schodowski; Michał Szpakowski; Krystian Aranowski; Rafał Hejmej	Daniel Trojanowski	Poland	5:57.67
8	Anton Kholyaznykov; Viktor Hrebennykov; Ivan Tymko; Artem Moroz; Andriy Pryveda; Valentyn Kletskoy; Oleh Lykov; Sergii Chykanov	Oleksandr Konovaliuk	Ukraine	6:07.33

==== Final A ====
Rank	Rowers	Coxswain	Nation	Time
1st place, gold medalist(s)	Filip Adamski; Andreas Kuffner; Eric Johannesen; Maximilian Reinelt; Richard Schmidt; Lukas Müller; Florian Mennigen; Kristof Wilke	Martin Sauer	Germany	5:48.75
2nd place, silver medalist(s)	Gabriel Bergen; Douglas Csima; Robert Gibson; Conlin McCabe; Malcolm Howard; Andrew Byrnes; Jeremiah Brown; Will Crothers	Brian Price	Canada	5:49.98
3rd place, bronze medalist(s)	Alex Partridge; James Foad; Tom Ransley; Richard Egington; Moe Sbihi; Greg Searle; Matt Langridge; Constantine Louloudis	Phelan Hill	Great Britain	5:51.18
4	David Banks; Grant James; Ross James; Will Miller; Giuseppe Lanzone; Stephen Kasprzyk; Jacob Cornelius; Brett Newlin	Zachary Vlahos	United States	5:51.48
5	Sjoerd Hamburger; Diederik Simon; Rogier Blink; Matthijs Vellenga; Roel Braas; Jozef Klaassen; Olivier Siegelaar; Mitchel Steenman	Peter Wiersum	Netherlands	5:51.72
6	Samuel Loch; Francis Hegerty; Cameron McKenzie-McHarg; Bryn Coudraye; Thomas Swann; Joshua Booth; Matt Ryan; Nicholas Purnell	Tobias Lister	Australia	5:51.87
