= Schodowski =

Schodowski (feminine: Schodowska, plural: Schodowscy) is a Polish surname. Notable people with the name include:

- Chuck Schodowski (born 1934), late-night horror hosts of The Big Chuck and Lil' John Show
- Jack Schodowski, Shelving, Inc. founder
- Marcin Schodowski (born 1987), Polish handball player
- Michelle Schodowski Capra, character from Northern Exposure
- Stanley S. Schodowski, 1991 New Jersey Inventors Hall of Fame
- Zbigniew Schodowski (born 1987), Polish rower
