= Scoob! (soundtrack) =

2020 soundtrack albums

Scoob! The Album

Soundtrack album by various artists
- Released: May 15, 2020
- Genres: Pop; rock; soul
- Length: 30:10
- Label: Atlantic

Singles from Scoob! The Album
- 1. "Summer Feelings" Released: May 6, 2020; 2. "On Me" Released: May 15, 2020

Scoob! The Album (Deluxe Edition)

Soundtrack album by various artists
- Released: May 15, 2020
- Genres: Pop; rock; soul; acoustic; remix
- Length: 40:05
- Label: Atlantic

Scoob! (Original Motion Picture Score)

Film score by Tom Holkenborg
- Released: May 29, 2020
- Genre: Film score
- Length: 48:01
- Label: WaterTower Music
- Producer: Tom Holkenborg

Tom Holkenborg chronology
Sonic the Hedgehog (2020)	Scoob! (2020)	Zack Snyder's Justice League (2021)

Scoob! The Album and Scoob! (Original Motion Picture Score) are the soundtracks for the 2020 animated film Scoob!. The former, which was released on May 15, 2020 featured two singles, "On Me" by Thomas Rhett and Kane Brown, featuring Ava Max, and "Summer Feelings" by Lennon Stella, featuring Charlie Puth. The soundtrack also includes other songs by various artists, including Sage the Gemini, R3hab, Pink Sweats, Galantis, Best Coast, Rico Nasty, and Jack Harlow. A deluxe edition was also released on the same day, featuring four additional renditions of the tracks. The latter, featured film score composed by Tom Holkenborg and was released digitally on May 29, 2020.

== Development ==
"This isn't a traditional score. It's really out there - with nods to industrial, hip-hop and even gabber. The majority of the score is me blending a lot of hip-hop rhythms and beats with the zanier elements of the original series. We used players on surf guitars and Hammond organs, and it was a great chance for me to get my hands dirty on the bass guitar and iconic drum machines, like the Emulator SP1200. I had a blast working on this. Scoob! was really a lot of fun."

— Tom Holkenborg, about Scoob!'s score, in an interview to ComicBook.com

On January 28, 2020, Tom Holkenborg signed on to compose the film's score. For the film's music, Holkenborg and the crew also looked back to the music of the original series as inspiration. Speaking in an interview to ComicBook.com, Holkenborg said that Scooby-doo is an "iconic character for multiple generations" and the score has "several layers in the sounds, ranging from counter-culture, surf rock and psychedelia". In the process, he mixed hip-hop beats from the 1960s with psychedelic elements for creating the score.

While creating the music, Holkenborg wanted to write several cues for every characters featured in the film. For Scoob and Shaggy, they created an emotional cue called "Coller theme" which "underscores their bonding and it comes back in various tones" and also wrote a "shenanigans" theme, for the fun elements shared between the two characters. Several characters, such as Mystery Inc., Dusty, Cerberus, Captain Caveman, Dee Dee Skyes, Dick Dastardly and Muttley, had independent themes, while Blue Falcon, Dynomutt and the Falcon Ship, had "heroic themes".

Dastardly's theme was created with urban beats with industrial sounds, and Muttley's theme was curated with distorted synths and growling bass sounds. For Caveman's theme, he drew influence from gabber, a Dutch genre of electronic dance music characterized by distorted synths. For "Mystery Inc." Holkenborg had created a separate cue with the 1960s hip-hop genres and sampled it with the sound of modern elements, to create the vibe from the television show. They also played surf guitars, and hammond organs for the score.

The original audio from Scooby-Doo television series, was found at the archives of Warner Bros. Studios, Burbank.

== Track listing ==
=== Scoob! The Album ===
Scoob! The Album's track list was first released on May 11, 2020, with two original songs, "On Me" by Thomas Rhett and Kane Brown, featuring Ava Max, and "Summer Feelings" by Lennon Stella, featuring Charlie Puth, were featured, while other artists such as Sage the Gemini, R3hab, Pink Sweat$, Galantis, Best Coast, Rico Nasty, and Jack Harlow, also perform their songs. The former was released on May 14, as a single, and the soundtrack was released in its entirety on May 15, along with its deluxe edition.

Scoob! The Album track listing
No.	Title	Writer(s)	Performer(s)	Length
1.	"Summer Feelings"	Alex Eskeerdo Izquierdo; Simon Wilcox; Charles L. Brown; Charlie Puth; Lowell; Lennon Stella; Vince Watson	Lennon Stella featuring Charlie Puth	2:40
2.	"On Me"	Andrew Cedar; Ben Johnson; Jason Derulo; Jim Lavigne	Thomas Rhett and Kane Brown featuring Ava Max	2:44
3.	"Back Up Plan"	Duran Ritz; James Priestner; Jan Cajka; Jared Priestner; Jeff Quinn; Lubomir Ivan	Rare Americans	2:36
4.	"I Like It"	Dave Bowden; Kenneth Wright	Pink Sweat$	1:54
5.	"Yikes"	Izquierdo; Demario Driver; Jack Harlow; Jayson Jackson; Blxst; Ray Keys; Uforo Ebong	Jack Harlow	2:09
6.	"My Little Alien"	Monro; Rico Nasty; Rachel Emily Moulden; Ross James	Rico Nasty	3:05
7.	"Homies"	Benjamin Goldberg; Brian Eisner; Jonathan Charles Glasser; Justin Clancy	Token	3:13
8.	"I Fly"	Izquierdo; Annie Lennox; Christian Karlsson; Dimi Sloane Sesson II; Hamid Bashir; Jan Postma; Jordi de Fluiter; Madison Emiko Love	Galantis featuring Faouzia	2:31
9.	"Feel Alive"	David LabuguenFadil El Ghoul; Lewis Hughes; Nathan Esquite; Nick Audino; Zachary Hannah	R3HAB featuring A R I Z O N A	2:30
10.	"Tick Tick Boom"	Izquierdo; Daniel Majic; Jim Lavigne; John Mitchell; DJ Frank E	Sage the Gemini featuring BygTwo3	2:10
11.	"25 Hours"	Max Wolfgang; Phil Plested; Chris Loco	Plested	3:32
12.	"Scooby-Doo Theme Song"	Ben Raleigh; David Mook	Best Coast	1:00

Scoob! The Album (Deluxe Edition) track listing
No.	Title	Writer(s)	Performer(s)	Length
1.	"Summer Feelings"	Alex Eskeerdo Izquierdo; Simon Wilcox; Charles L. Brown; Charlie Puth; Lowell; Lennon Stella; Vince Watson	Puth; Stella	2:40
2.	"On Me"	Andrew Cedar; Ben Johnson; Jason Derulo; Jim Lavigne	Ava Max; Kane Brown; Thomas Rhett	2:44
3.	"Back Up Plan"	Duran Ritz; James Priestner; Jan Cajka; Jared Priestner; Jeff Quinn; Lubomir Ivan	Rare Americans	2:36
4.	"I Like It"	Dave Bowden; Kenneth Wright	Pink Sweat$	1:54
5.	"Yikes"	Izquierdo; Demario Driver; Jack Harlow; Jayson Jackson; Blxst; Ray Keys; Uforo Ebong	Harlow	2:09
6.	"My Little Alien"	Monro; Rico Nasty; Rachel Emily Moulden; Ross James	Nasty	3:05
7.	"Homies"	Benjamin Goldberg; Brian Eisner; Jonathan Charles Glasser; Justin Clancy	Token	3:13
8.	"I Fly"	Izquierdo; Annie Lennox; Christian Karlsson; Dimi Sloane Sesson II; Hamid Bashir; Jan Postma; Jordi de Fluiter; Madison Emiko Love	Faouzia; Galantis	2:31
9.	"Tick Tick Boom"	Izquierdo; Daniel Majic; Jim Lavigne; John Mitchell; DJ Frank E	BygTwo3; Sage the Gemini	2:10
10.	"25 Hours"	Max Wolfgang; Phil Plested; Chris Loco	Plested	3:32
11.	"Scooby-Doo Theme Song"	Ben Raleigh; David Mook	Best Coast	1:00
12.	"Summer Feelings" (Acoustic)	Izquierdo; Wilcox; Brown; Puth; Lowell; Stella; Watson	Puth; Stella	2:38
13.	"Summer Feelings" (Morgan Page Remix)	Izquierdo; Wilcox; Brown; Puth; Lowell; Stella; Watson	Puth; Stella; Page	3:21
14.	"Summer Feelings" (Jengi Remix)	Izquierdo; Wilcox; Brown; Puth; Lowell; Stella; Watson	Puth; Stella; Jengi	2:55
15.	"Summer Feelings" (Novodor Remix)	Izquierdo; Wilcox; Brown; Puth; Lowell; Stella; Watson	Puth; Stella; Novodor	3:31

=== Scoob! (Original Motion Picture Score) ===
Holkenborg's score was released as Scoob! (Original Motion Picture Score) on May 29.

No.	Title	Length
1.	"Scooby-Doo, Where Are You?"	1:25
2.	"Sandwich Bonding"	1:03
3.	"Scooby's Collar"	0:46
4.	"Haunted House"	1:53
5.	"First Case Solved"	0:47
6.	"Bowling for Robots"	3:03
7.	"Air Battle with Dastardly"	2:50
8.	"Dick and the Rottens"	2:13
9.	"Amusement Park Arrival"	1:23
10.	"Dastardly Attacks"	0:56
11.	"Hall of Mirrors"	2:38
12.	"Entry of the Gladiators"	1:11
13.	"Gang Escapes"	2:53
14.	"Legend of Cerberus / Muttley's Story"	3:13
15.	"Mystery Island Landing"	1:05
16.	"Dastardly Surprise"	1:28
17.	"Athens Arrival"	4:39
18.	"Cerberus Unleashed"	3:14
19.	"Blue Falcon"	3:45
20.	"Dick Finds Muttley"	1:48
21.	"Noble Sacrifice"	5:39

== Credits ==
- Score composer, programmer, and mixer: Tom Holkenborg
- Music editors: Catherine Wilson • Katie Greathouse • Will Kaplan • Dominick Certo
- Score recorder: Chris Fogel
- Score conductor: Conrad Pope
- Orchestrators: Edward Trybek • Henri Wilikinson • Jonathan Beard • Tom Holkenborg
- Music preparation by: Edward Trybek • Henri Wilikinson
- Orchestra contractor: Peter Rotter for Encompass Music Partners
- Concertmaster: Bruce Dukov
- Choir contractor and conductor: Jasper Randall for Encompass Music Partners
- Additional synth programmers: Daniel Bejibom • Sara Barone • Shwan Askari • Jarrod Royles-Atkins
- Technical score engineers: Jacopo Trifone • Gevorg Chepchyan
- Digital recordist: Kevin Globerman
- Score recorded at: ELBO Studios, Glendale, CA • Eastwood Scoring Stage, Warner Bros.

== Additional music ==
Songs that are not featured in the soundtrack, but included in the film are:

- "California Love (Remix)" - 2Pac, Dr. Dre, Roger Troutman
- "Show Me the Meaning of Being Lonely" - The Backstreet Boys
- "One" - Three Dog Night
- "Mr. Lonely" - Bobby Vinton
- "Shallow" - Lady Gaga, Bradley Cooper
- "Baby Talk" - Jan & Dean
- "Sirius" - The Alan Parsons Project
- "All I Do Is Win" - DJ Khaled ft. T-Pain, Ludacris, Snoop Dogg, Rick Ross
- "Let's Get It On" - Marvin Gaye
- "B.O.B." - Outkast

== Reception ==
Holkenborg's score received positive response from Jonathan Broxton, stating "Tom Holkenborg's writing has become so much richer, so much more impressively complicated, and so much more intellectually stimulating". In contrast, James Southall of Movie Wave wrote "We have some classic cartoonish mickey-mousing (the Remote Control sound on the orchestra); we have some mock-gothic horror music; surf rock; some big action cues; some classic heist-style music; some modern electronic stuff but nowhere near as much "industrial, hip-hop and even gabber". It's good-natured music but flits about all over the place, from one style to another every few seconds – it must have been exhausting to write and it is exhausting to listen to." Filmtracks gave a mixed review, stating "Together, these elements, despite their somewhat smart design, never coalesce into a truly functional film score, the main themes underplayed and the narrative badly neglected. It's a resume-builder for Holkenborg, surely, but an obnoxious one at that."
