= Lukas Müller =

Lukas Müller may refer to:

- Lukas Müller (ski jumper), Austrian ski jumper
- Lukas Müller (rower), German rower
