= Ivana Filipović =

Serbian rower

Personal information
- Born: 9 November 1989 (age 36) Novi Sad, SR Serbia, Yugoslavia
Medal record
Women's Rowing
Representing Serbia
European Championships
Silver medal – second place	2011 Plovdiv	Double sculls

Ivana Filipović (Serbian: Ивана Филиповић, born 9 November 1989 in Novi Sad, SR Serbia, Yugoslavia) is a rower from Serbia.

At the 2011 World Rowing U23 Championships in Amsterdam, she won 4th place in Single Sculls event.

Filipović won the silver medal in the Women's Double Sculls event at the 2011 European Rowing Championships in Plovdiv, Bulgaria.

Ivana lists Milica Vodogaz as one of her favorite teammates to row with.
