= Robert Gibson (rower) =

Canadian rower

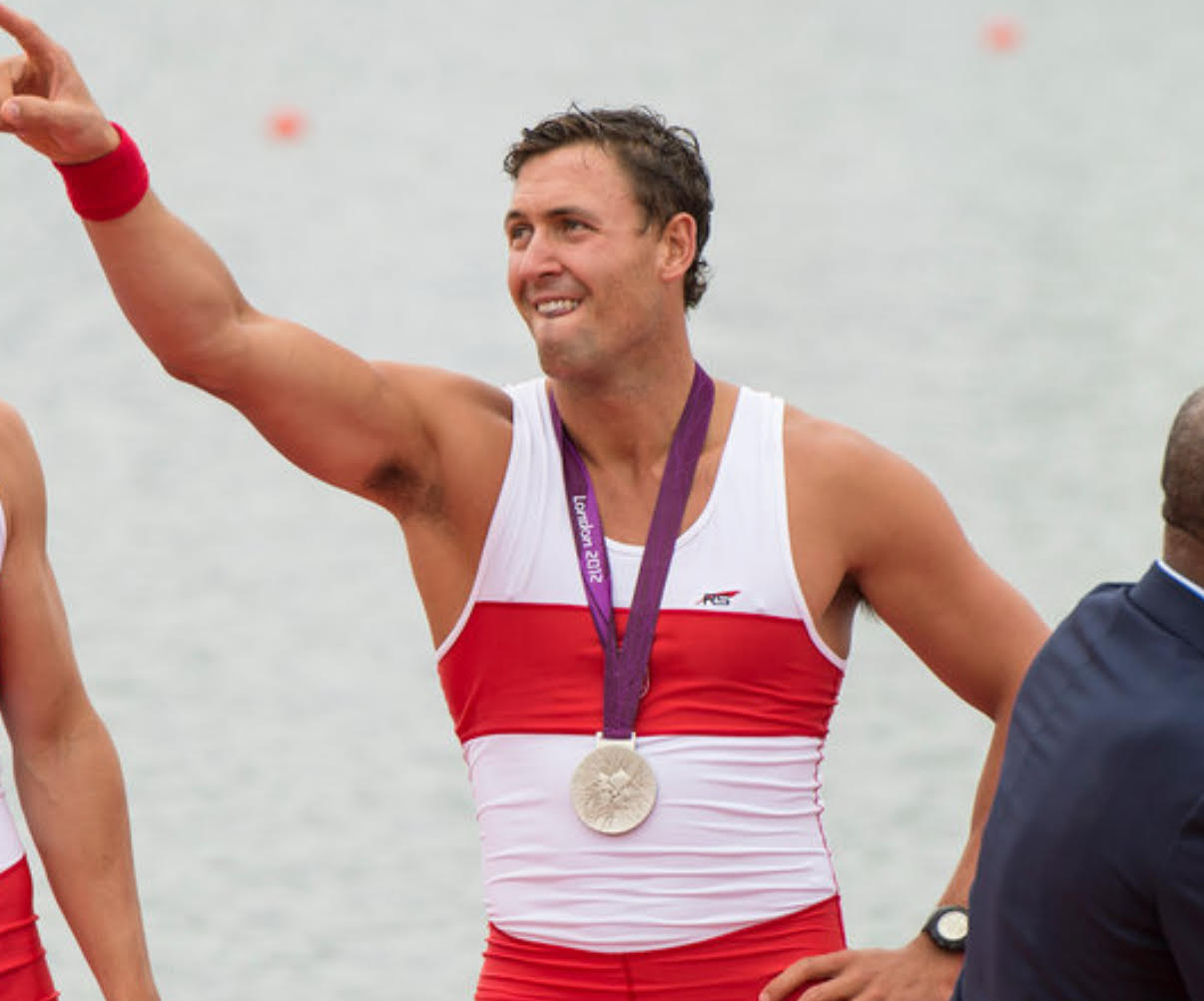
- Gibson at the London 2012 Olympics

Personal information
- Full name: Robert Gibson
- Nationality: Canada
- Born: February 2, 1986 (age 40) Kingston, Ontario
- Height: 1.94 m (6 ft 4 in)
- Weight: 225 lb (102 kg)

Sport
- College team: Washington
- Club: Kingston Rowing Club; Varsity Boat Club
Medal record
Men's rowing
Representing Canada
Olympic Games
Silver medal – second place	2012 London	Men's eight
World Championships
Silver medal – second place	2006 Dorney	Coxed four
Silver medal – second place	2009 Poznań	Eight
Bronze medal – third place	2011 Bled	Eight
World U23 Championships
Gold medal – first place	2006 Heindonk	Eight
Silver medal – second place	2008; Brandenburg an der Havel	Eight
World Junior Championships
Bronze medal – third place	2004 Banyoles	Coxed four
Pan American Games
Gold medal – first place	2015 Toronto	Quadruple sculls
Silver medal – second place	2015 Toronto	Single sculls

Robert Gibson (born February 2, 1986) is a Canadian rower.

In 2004, he was the Canadian Indoor Rowing Champion and became the Canadian High School Rowing champion in the Men's 2- with partner Will Crothers. He also earned a scholarship to attend the University of Washington and won a bronze medal at the Junior World Rowing Championships in the Men's coxed 4+.

He was officially named as the alternate to the 2008 Beijing Olympics Gold Medal Winning Men's 8+.

He won a silver medal at the 2012 Summer Olympics in the men's eight with Gabriel Bergen, Andrew Byrnes, Jeremiah Brown, Will Crothers, Douglas Csima, Malcolm Howard, Conlin McCabe and Brian Price.

He was a recipient of the Queen Elizabeth II Diamond Jubilee Medal in 2012. He was a recipient of the official 'Key to the City of Kingston' in 2012, along with fellow Kingstonian Olympic Athletes Will Crothers and Dylan Wykes.

At the 2015 Pan American Games he won a gold medal in the Men's Quad 4x as well as a silver medal in the Men's Single 1x.

In June 2016, he was officially named to Canada's 2016 Olympic team in the Mens 4X finishing 8th.

He was the Director of Rowing and Head Coach at the Windsor School in Albany, located in Nassau, The Bahamas from 2021 to 2025, where he started the first high school rowing team in the Caribbean region.
