= Bryn Coudraye =

Australian rower

Personal information
- Born: 11 July 1986 (age 39) Murray Bridge, South Australia

Sport
- Sport: Rowing

Bryn Coudraye (born 11 July 1986) is an Australian rower. He competed in the Men's eight event at the 2012 Summer Olympics.
