= Jeremiah Brown (rower) =

Canadian rower (born 1985)

Personal information
- Full name: Jeremiah Brown
- Nationality: Canada
- Born: 25 November 1985 (age 40) Hamilton, Ontario
- Height: 1.98 m (6 ft 6 in)
- Weight: 234 lb (106 kg)
Medal record
Men's rowing
Representing Canada
Olympic Games
Silver medal – second place	2012 London	Eight
World Championships
Bronze medal – third place	2011 Bled	Eight

Jeremiah Brown (born 25 November 1985) is one of few people to ever go from complete beginner to Olympic medallist in less than four years. Brown won a silver medal at the 2012 Summer Olympics as part of the Canadian men's eight. Brown then became leader of the Canadian Olympic Committee's athlete wellness and transition programs for four years before becoming an author and keynote speaker on transformation, perseverance, and resilience.

== Career ==
Originally playing as an offensive lineman in college football for the McMaster Marauders in Hamilton, Brown decided to move to British Columbia to begin his transition to rowing after watching the Canadian men's eight win gold at the 2008 Summer Olympics. He started a learn-to-row program with the Canadian national program and spent 1,700 hours in training to learn the sport. In his competitive career he won a silver medal at the 2010 nationals as a singles sculler and he next achieved success when he won a bronze at the 2011 World Rowing Championships.

Brown won a silver medal at the 2012 Summer Olympics in the men's eight with Andrew Byrnes, Gabriel Bergen, Will Crothers, Douglas Csima, Robert Gibson, Malcolm Howard, Conlin McCabe and Brian Price. The Canadian eights had performed poorly in the heats, finishing last and casting doubt on their ability to win a medal. However, in the repechage, they finished second, behind the Great Britain crew. In the A final, the Canadian boat managed to pull past Great Britain to finish in the silver medal position - behind the German boat, who were the reigning three-time world champions.

== Memoir ==
In March 2018, Brown released a memoir called The 4 Year Olympian: From First Stroke to Olympic Medallist (Dundurn Press). The Toronto Star wrote of the book, "Tells the story of what it means to train hard, really hard, and develop the mental and physical skills needed for success."
