= Jacob Cornelius =

American rower (born 1984)

Personal information
- Born: October 2, 1984 (age 41) Magnolia, Arkansas, United States

Sport
- Sport: Rowing
- College team: Stanford
- Coached by: Craig Amerkhanian

Achievements and titles
- Olympic finals: London 2012

Jacob Cornelius (born Oct 2, 1984) is an American rower. He competed in the Men's eight event at the 2012 Summer Olympics. He also rowed in the 2007 University Boat Race.
