= Andrew Byrnes =

Canadian rower (born 1983)

Personal information
- Full name: James Andrew Byrnes
- Born: May 22, 1983 (age 43) Toronto, Ontario, Canada
- Height: 2.01 m (6 ft 7 in)
- Weight: 205 lb (93 kg)

Sport
- Country: Canada
- Sport: Rowing
- Club: North Star Rowing Club
Medal record
Men's rowing
Representing Canada
Olympic Games
Gold medal – first place	2008 Beijing	Eight
Silver medal – second place	2012 London	Eight
World Championships
Gold medal – first place	2007 Oberschleißheim	Eight
Silver medal – second place	2009 Poznań	Eight
Bronze medal – third place	2006 Dorney	Coxed pair
Bronze medal – third place	2011 Bled	Eight
World U23 Championships
Bronze medal – third place	2005 Amsterdam	Eight
World Cup
Gold medal – first place	2007 Lucerne	Eight
Gold medal – first place	2007 Ottensheim	Eight
Gold medal – first place	2008 Lucerne	Eight

James Andrew Byrnes (born May 22, 1983) is a Canadian rower and Olympic gold medallist. He was born in Toronto, Ontario and raised in Ithaca, New York. Byrnes is a 2005 graduate of Bates College in Maine, where he crewed for the Bates Rowing Team and earned a master's degree in engineering from the University of Pennsylvania in 2006.

He has won four World Rowing Championships medals: a bronze in 2006 in the men's coxed pair with Derek O'Farrell and Brian Price, and a gold in 2007, a silver in 2009, and a bronze in 2011, all in the men's eight.

He won a gold medal at the 2008 Summer Olympics in the men's eights with Ben Rutledge, Kyle Hamilton, Malcolm Howard, Adam Kreek, Kevin Light, Dominic Sieterle, Jake Wetzel and cox Brian Price.

He won a silver medal at the 2012 Summer Olympics in the men's eight. His teammates included Malcolm Howard and Brian Price, who he won gold with in 2008. The other six were Gabriel Bergen, Jeremiah Brown, Will Crothers, Douglas Csima, Robert Gibson and Conlin McCabe.
