= Tom James (rower) =

British Olympic rower (born 1984)

Tom James MBE
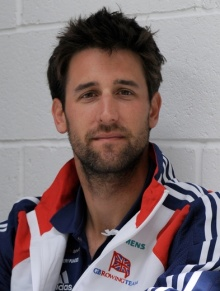

Personal information
- Nationality: British
- Born: Thomas James; 11 March 1984 (age 42) Cardiff, South Glamorgan, Wales
- Home town: Coedpoeth, Wrexham County Borough, Wales
- Height: 190 cm (6.2 ft)
- Weight: 85 kg (187 lb)

Sport
- Country: Great Britain
- Sport: Men's rowing
- Events: Coxless Four, Eight
- College team: Cambridge University
- Club: Molesey Boat Club
- Coached by: Jürgen Gröbler
Medal record
Men's rowing
Representing Great Britain
Summer Olympics
Gold medal – first place	2008 Beijing	Coxless four
Gold medal – first place	2012 London	Coxless four
World Championships
Gold medal – first place	2011 Bled	Coxless four
Bronze medal – third place	2003 Milan	Eights
Bronze medal – third place	2007 Munich	Eights
World Cup
Gold medal – first place	2011 Munich	Coxless four

Thomas James MBE (born 11 March 1984) is a British rower, twice Olympic champion and victorious Cambridge Blue. In a British coxless four in 2012 he set a world's best time which still stood as of 2021.

== Background and early life ==
James was born in Cardiff and spent part of his childhood in Berlin, Germany as his father was an officer in the British Army, but considers his hometown to be the village of Coedpoeth, near Wrexham.

James was educated at Packwood Haugh School near Ruyton-XI-Towns, and then at The King's School, Chester. He was a keen sportsman and played football and rugby before being diagnosed with Osgood–Schlatter disease, forcing him to switch to rowing instead. While at King's, he was schoolmates and shared a boat with fellow Olympian Chris Bartley. He went up to Trinity Hall, Cambridge in 2002, obtaining his undergraduate degree in engineering in 2007.

== Rowing career ==
=== The Boat Race ===
Whilst at Cambridge University, James was a member of Cambridge University Boat Club (CUBC) and took part in The Boat Race four times in five years between 2003 and 2007 (taking a year off to train for the 2004 Summer Olympics). He was elected president of CUBC for the 2006–07 academic year.

Having concentrated his efforts on the Olympics in 2004, James returned to Cambridge in 2005. Both universities had extremely strong intakes that year, with Cambridge boasting several world champions and the Oxford crew including Olympic silver medalist Barney Williams. Oxford won the epic contest by 2 lengths in a time of 16 minutes 41 seconds. In 2006, the weather was particularly bad, and Cambridge lost again, this time by 5 lengths.

After three years of disappointment, James returned to the boat race one final time in 2007, this time as President of CUBC. In a race where Cambridge were strong favourites based on the team members' individual successes, the light blues showed their class by staying in touch while Oxford had the advantage, and pushing on with tidier rowing from the halfway point. They rowed on to win by a length and a quarter, finally providing James with a victory at the fourth attempt.

=== International ===
Having won a bronze medal in 2001 with GB Junior eights and silver in 2002 at the World Rowing Junior Championships, James won his first senior international vest in 2003. He stroked the Great Britain Eight, which won a bronze medal at the World Championships in Milan.

Following this success, James decided that training for the Olympics and studying for his engineering degree were incompatible. He took a year off from his studies at Cambridge, and trained with the Leander Club in Henley-on-Thames. The buildup to the Olympics for the GB Men's Rowing Squad was somewhat disrupted due to illness, injury and variable form. James fell ill the night before the Heat in the Olympic competition – a devastating blow and whilst he returned for the repechage, the crew failed to make the final.

After taking a break from international rowing, James returned to the British Team in 2006, forming a pair with Oxford rival Colin Smith. The duo raced to a surprise silver behind reigning world champions New Zealand at the Lucerne World Cup regatta to earn selection for the world championships at Eton's Dorney Lake, making the final and finishing sixth.

In Summer 2007 he was subbed in for Alex Partridge in the flagship British rowing boat, the coxless four, which won Henley Royal Regatta in July 2007 and then took silver seven days later in the Lucerne World Cup Regatta.

He was then selected in the GB coxed four for the world championships in Munich, but was promoted to the bow seat of the eight when the original incumbent fell ill on the morning of the heats. The crew made the final, securing GB qualification for the Beijing Olympics, and took the bronze behind Canada and Germany.

Reunited with Colin Smith in a pair, James finished second at the GB final trials regatta in March, 2008, to put himself well on course for a place at his second Olympics. He was then selected for the GB coxless four along with Andy Triggs-Hodge, Steve Williams and Pete Reed.

After a difficult early season, with both James and Triggs-Hodge picking up injuries, the four raced together for the first time in Poznan in the final World Cup event of the season, finishing third. The GB four then dominated their heats and semi finals at the Olympics Beijing. In the final, however, the Australian four led for most of the way. Only a dramatic push by the British boat in the closing stages made the difference; they won the nail-biting final to become gold medallists in a time of 6 minutes 6.57 seconds, beating the Australian four by 1.28 seconds.

At the 2011 World Rowing Championships in Bled, Slovenia, James raced in the men's four with crew-mates Matt Langridge, Ric Egington and Alex Gregory winning a gold medal ahead of Greece in second and Australia in third.

During the 2012 World Rowing Cup in Lucerne, James rejoined Gregory in the fours while Reed and Triggs Hodge were switched over from the pairs. They set a new world record during the heats at the second regatta with a time of 5:37.86. At the Olympics, they beat main rivals Australia in the semi-finals, and then repeated their win in the final. For James, Reed and Triggs Hodge, it was their second gold medal in the category, following their win in Beijing four years prior.

== Honours and recognition ==
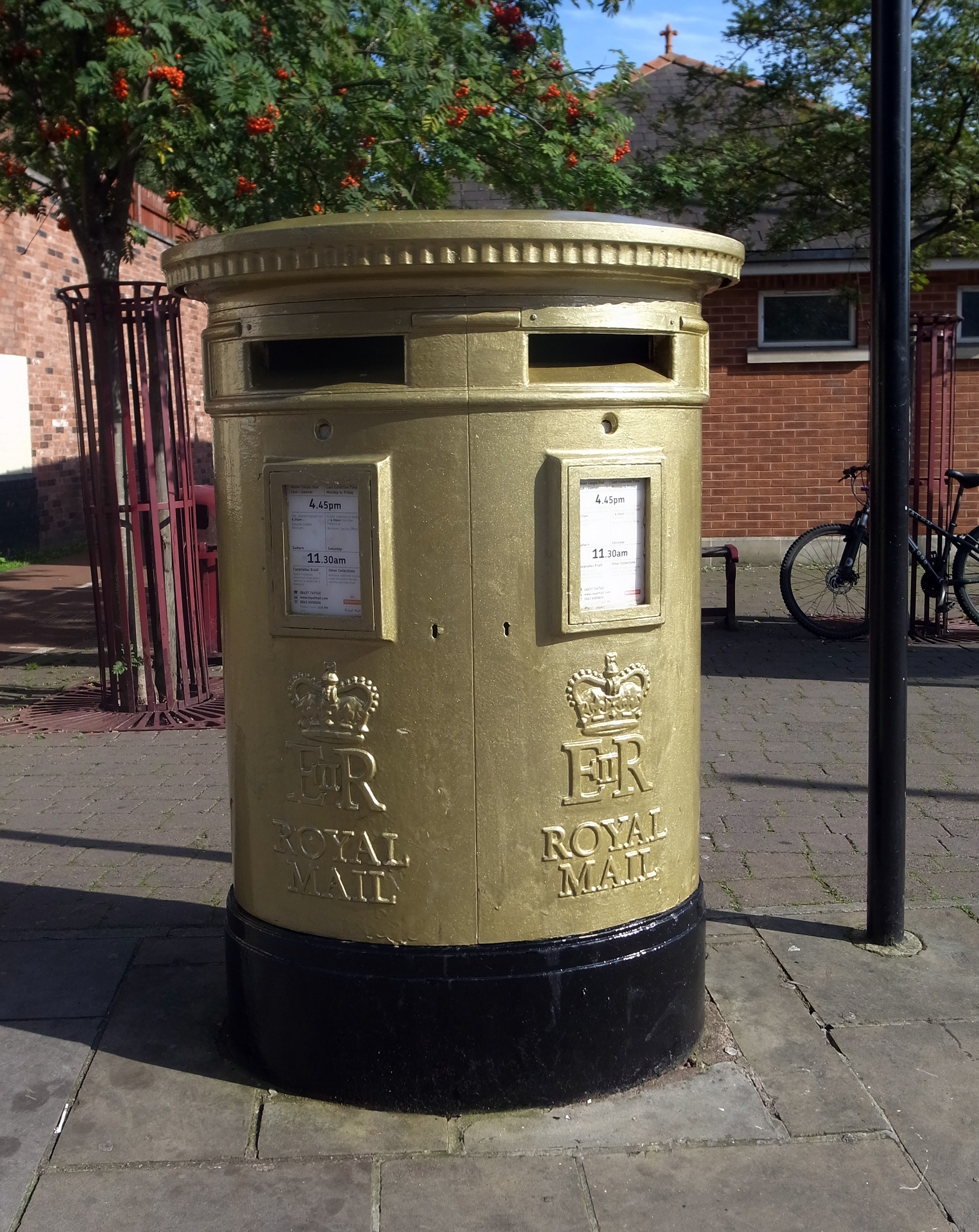
Post box in Wrexham painted gold to celebrate Tom James' gold medal win at the 2012 Summer Olympics

All British gold medal winners at the 2012 Olympics were honoured with appearing on Royal Mail postage stamps, and having a post box in their home town painted gold. James' "golden" post boxes are located in Wrexham and Coedpoeth.

He was awarded the Freedom of the Borough of Wrexham after successfully defending his gold medal in the coxless fours event at the 2012 Olympics.

He was appointed Member of the Order of the British Empire (MBE) in the 2009 New Year Honours.

== Post-retirement ==
James lives in London. He was appointed a Steward of the Henley Royal Regatta in 2014. Since retiring he has also done some commentating during the rowing season, mostly at the Henley Royal Regatta and The Boat Race.

James retired from professional rowing in November 2013. Having previously worked for the management consultancy Oliver Wyman James now works as Head of Product and Operations at Executive Nexus.

On 2 January 2015 James was a member of the winning team on Christmas University Challenge, representing Trinity Hall, Cambridge who defeated Balliol College, Oxford, the University of Edinburgh and the University of Hull. His teammates were world champion cyclist Emma Pooley, novelist Adam Mars-Jones, and actor Dan Starkey.

== Achievements ==
=== Olympics ===
- 2012 London – Gold, Coxless Four (3 seat)
- 2008 Beijing – Gold, Coxless Four (bow)
- 2004 Athens – 9th, Eight (stroke)

=== World championships ===
- 2011 Bled – Gold, Coxless Four
- 2007 Munich – Bronze, Eight (bow)
- 2006 Eton – 6th, Coxless Pair (stroke)
- 2003 Milan – Bronze, Eight (stroke)

=== Junior World championships ===
- 2002 Trakai – Silver,
- 2001 Duisburg – Bronze, Eight (six)

=== World Cups ===
- 2012 Lucerne – Gold, Coxless four (3 seat)
- 2012 Belgrade – Gold, Coxless Four (3 seat)
- 2011 Munich – Gold, Coxless Four (3 seat)
- 2011 Lucerne – Gold, Coxless Four (3 seat)
- 2007 Lucerne – Silver, Coxless Four (3 seat)
- 2006 Lucerne – Silver, Coxless Pair (stroke)
- 2004 Lucerne – 6th, Eight (stroke)
- 2004 Munich – 4th, Eight (stroke)
- 2004 Poznań – 5th, Eight (stroke)
- 2003 Milan – 3rd, Eight (stroke)
- 2003 Lucerne – 1st, Eight (stroke)
- 2003 Munich – 3rd, Eight (stroke)

=== The Boat Race ===
- 2007 – 5 – Won
- 2006 – 7 – Lost
- 2005 – 7 – Lost
- 2003 – 6 – Lost

=== GB Rowing Team Senior Trials ===
- 2012 – 4th, Coxless Pair
- 2011 – 2nd, Coxless Pair

== See also ==
- List of Cambridge University Boat Race crews
- Rowing at the Summer Olympics
- 2012 Summer Olympics and Paralympics gold post boxes
