= Thomas Swann (rower) =

Australian rower

Personal information
- Nickname: Swanny
- Born: 15 October 1987 (age 38) Echuca, Australia

Sport
- Sport: Rowing

Thomas Swann (born 15 October 1987) is an Australian rower. He competed in the Men's eight event at the 2012 Summer Olympics.

== Performances ==
- 2nd (eight) – 2012 World Cup 3 (Munich, Germany)
- 6th (eight) – 2012 World Cup 2 (Lucerne, Switzerland)
- 4th (eight) – 2011 World Championships (Bled, Slovenia)
- 7th (eight) – 2011 World Cup 3 (Lucerne, Switzerland)
- 4th (four) – 2011 Australian Rowing Championships (West Lakes, South Australia)

== Highlights ==
- Silver Medal : 2010 Rowing World Cup in Lucerne, Switzerland (men's eight)
- Bronze Medal : 2007 U23 World Championships in Strathclyde, Scotland (men's quad)
