= Douglas Csima =

Canadian rower

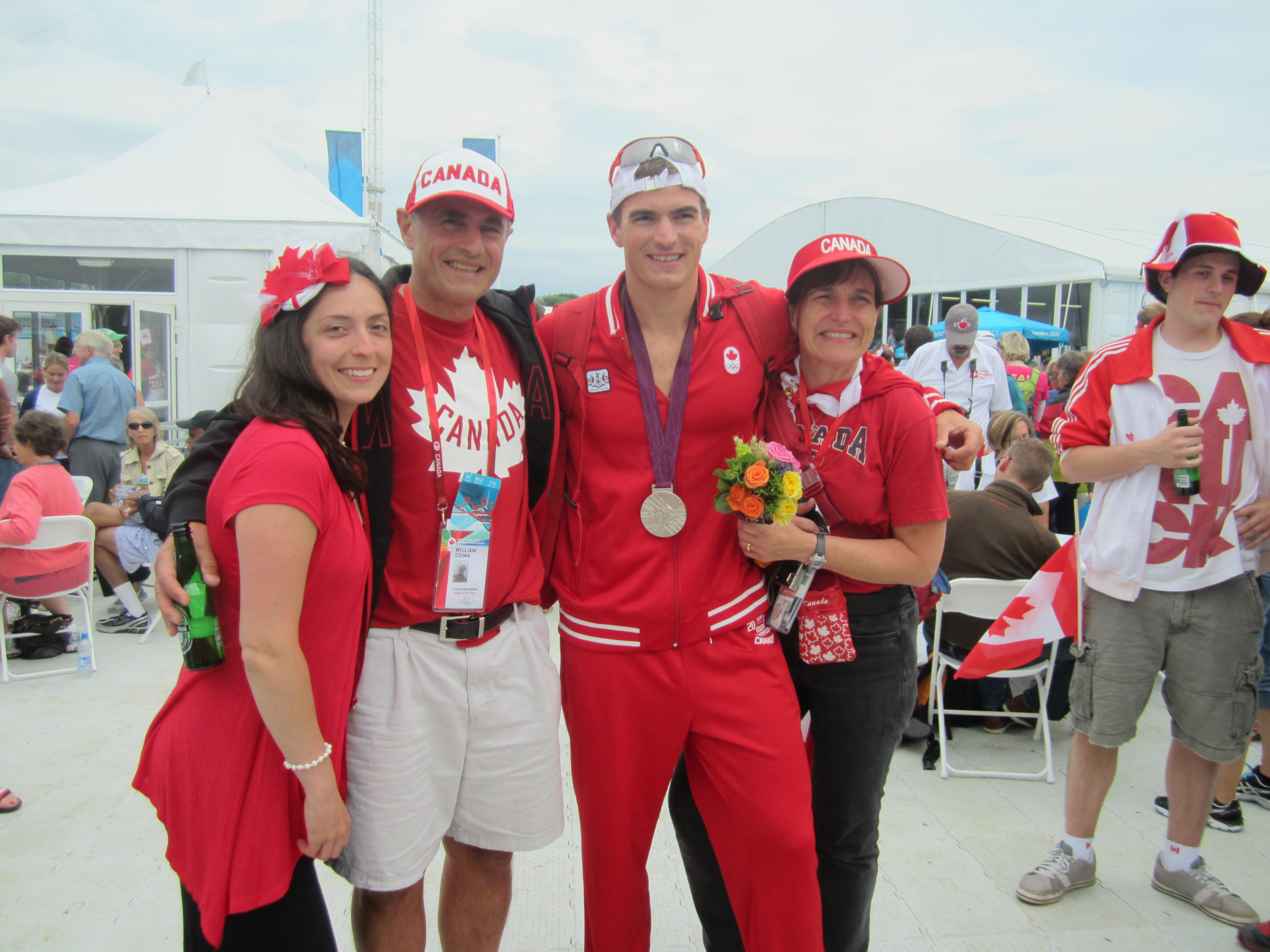
- Csima with his family

Personal information
- Full name: Douglas Csima
- Nickname: Doug
- Nationality: Canada
- Born: November 28, 1985 (age 40) Mississauga, Ontario
- Height: 1.91 m (6 ft 3 in)
- Weight: 220 lb (100 kg)

Sport
- College team: McMaster University
- Club: Leander Boat Club, Hamilton, Ontario, Canada
Medal record
Men's rowing
Representing Canada
Olympic Games
Silver medal – second place	2012 London	Eight
World Rowing Championships
Silver medal – second place	2009 Poznań	Eight
Bronze medal – third place	2011 Bled	Eight

Douglas Csima (born 28 November 1985 in Mississauga) is a Canadian rower.

He won a silver medal at the 2012 Summer Olympics in the men's eight with Andrew Byrnes, Gabriel Bergen, Jeremiah Brown, Will Crothers, Robert Gibson, Malcolm Howard, Conlin McCabe and Brian Price.
