= Richard Egington =

British rower

Ric Egington
Personal information
- Full name: Richard Phillip Egington
- Nationality: British
- Born: 26 February 1979 (age 47) Warrington
- Education: University of Reading (Zoology)
- Height: 200 cm (6 ft 7 in)
- Weight: 105 kg (231 lb)
- Spouse: Vicky Thornley
Medal record
Men's rowing
Representing Great Britain
Olympic Games
Silver medal – second place	2008 Beijing	Eight
Bronze medal – third place	2012 London	Eight
World Championships
Gold medal – first place	2009 Poznan	Coxless four (M4-)
Gold medal – first place	2011 Bled	Coxless four (M4-)

Richard Phillip Egington (born 26 February 1979 in Warrington, Cheshire) is a British rower. He won a silver medal at the 2008 Summer Olympics for Great Britain in the men's eight. He was part of the British squad that topped the medal table at the 2011 World Rowing Championships in Bled, where he won a gold medal as part of the coxless four with Matt Langridge, Tom James and Alex Gregory.

At the 2012 Summer Olympics in London, United Kingdom he was part of the British crew that won the bronze medal in the eight.

== Personal life ==
In 2020, Egington married Olympic rower Vicky Thornley.
