= Conlin McCabe =

Canadian rower (born 1990)

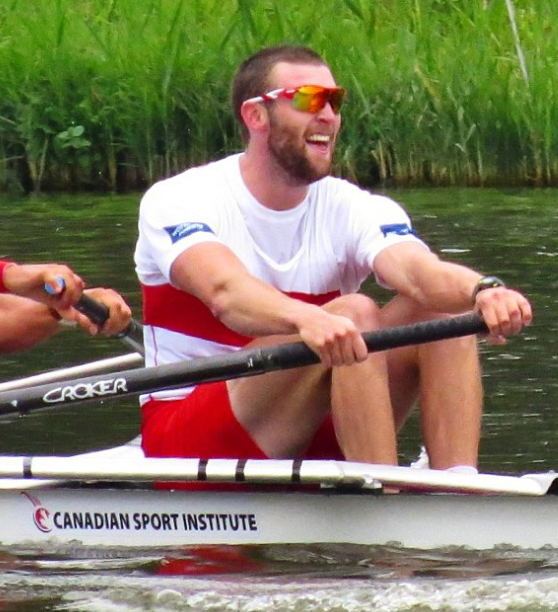
- Conlin McCabe

Personal information
- Nationality: Canada
- Born: August 20, 1990 (age 35) Brockville, Ontario
- Height: 205 cm (6 ft 9 in)
- Weight: 108 kg (238 lb)

Sport
- University team: Washington Huskies
Medal record
Men's rowing
Representing Canada
Olympic Games
Silver medal – second place	2012 London	Eight
World Championships
Bronze medal – third place	2011 Bled	Eight
World U23 Championships
Silver medal – second place	2008; Brandenburg an der Havel	Eight
Silver medal – second place	2010 Brest	Coxless pair
World Junior Championships
Silver medal – second place	2007 Beijing	Coxless pair
Pan American Games
Gold medal – first place	2015 Toronto	Coxless four
Gold medal – first place	2015 Toronto	Eight

Conlin McCabe (born August 20, 1990) is a Canadian rower. He won a silver medal at the 2012 Olympic games and two gold medals at the 2015 Pan American Games.

Born in Brockville, Ontario, McCabe rowed for the University of Washington from 2009 to 2013 (after taking a year off for the Olympics), helping the Huskies win three national championships. McCabe majored in Geography while at Washington. He also came in first at the 2011 CRASH-B Sprints, a 2000-metre indoor rowing race with a time of 5:48.0. This made McCabe the first Canadian to ever win a CRASH-B competition in the Men's Open category.

McCabe's international racing career started at the World Rowing Junior Championships. He placed fourth in the coxed pair in 2006 and won a silver medal in the coxless pair in 2007 with Anthony Jacob. McCabe went on to compete at two Under-23 World Championships, winning a silver in 2010 in the coxless pair (also with Jacob) and finishing fourth in the coxless four in 2009.

He won a silver medal at the 2012 Summer Olympics in the men's eight with Andrew Byrnes, Gabriel Bergen, Jeremiah Brown, Will Crothers, Douglas Csima, Robert Gibson, Malcolm Howard and Brian Price.

In 2016 McCabe competed on Canada's 2016 Olympic team in the coxless four which placed 6th overall.

McCabe competed at the 2020 Summer Olympics in the pair with Kai Langerfeld where they placed 4th.
