= Grant James (rower) =

American rower (born 1987)

Personal information
- Born: August 17, 1987 (age 38) Alamosa, Colorado, United States

Sport
- Sport: Rowing
Medal record
Men's rowing
Representing United States
World Championships
Silver medal – second place	2014 Amsterdam	M4−
Bronze medal – third place	2013 Chungjiu	M4−

Grant James (born August 17, 1987) is an American rower. He competed in the Men's eight event at the 2012 Summer Olympics, with his twin brother Ross.
