= Will Miller (rower) =

American rower (born 1984)

Personal information
- Born: June 13, 1984 (age 42) Boston, Massachusetts, United States
- Height: 6 ft 5 in (196 cm)
- Weight: 210 lb (95 kg)

Sport
- Country: USA
- Sport: Rowing
- College team: Northeastern University

Achievements and titles
- Olympic finals: 2012
- Highest world ranking: 4th

Will Miller (born June 13, 1984) is an American rower. He is a five time US National Team Member and competed in the Men's eight event at the 2012 Summer Olympics placing 4th. His father, Bill Miller, was also a US Olympic rower.
