= Malcolm Howard (rower) =

Canadian rower (born 1983)

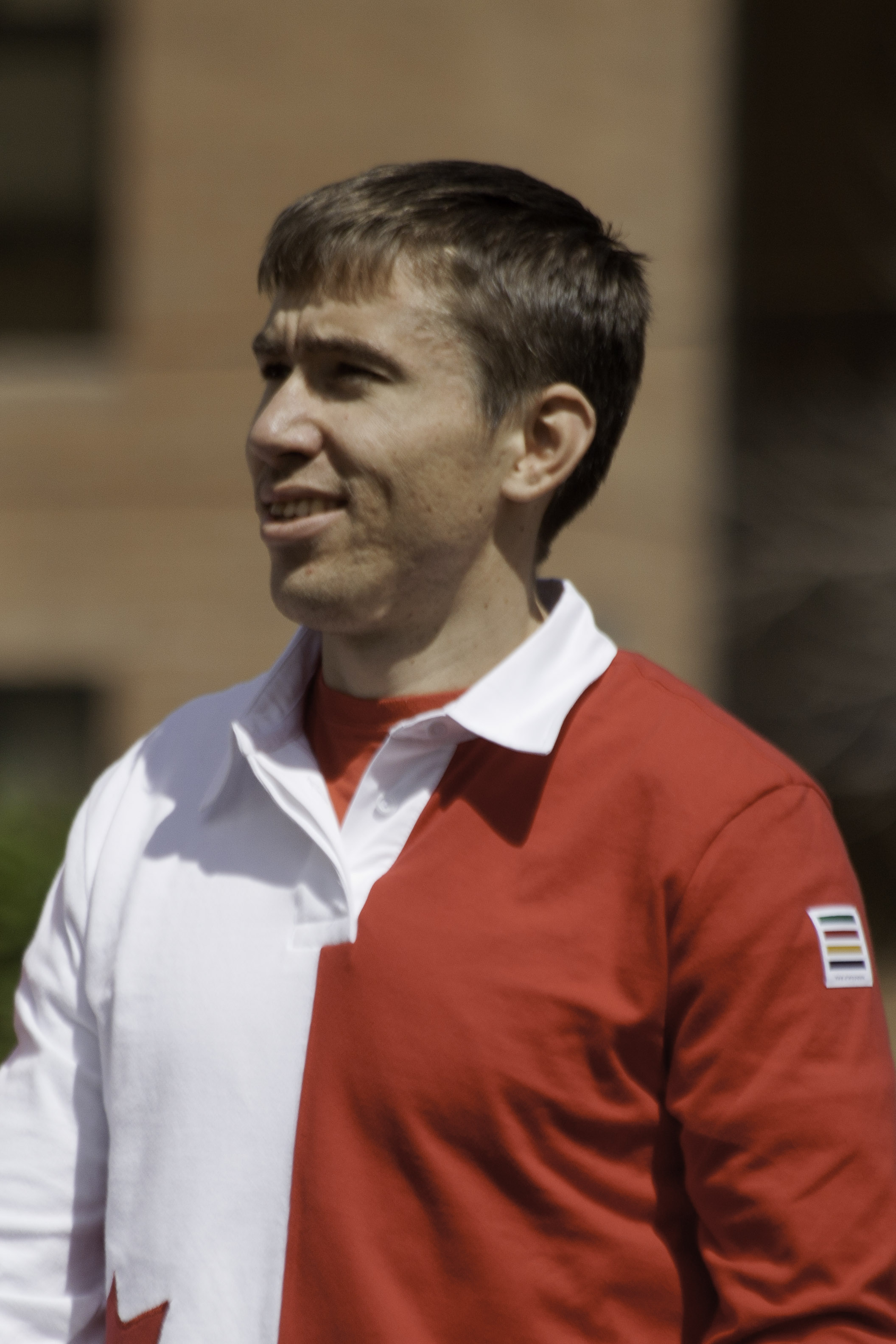
- Howard in 2014

Personal information
- Born: February 7, 1983 (age 43) Victoria, British Columbia, Canada
- Height: 1.98 m (6 ft 6 in)
- Weight: 234 lb (106 kg)
- Spouse: Erika-Leigh Stirton (m. 2011)

Sport
- Country: Canada
- Sport: rowing
- College team: Harvard
- Club: Brentwood College
Medal record
Men's rowing
Representing Canada
Olympic Games
Gold medal – first place	2008 Beijing	Men's eight
Silver medal – second place	2012 London	Men's eight
World Championships
Gold medal – first place	2007 Oberschleißheim	Eight
Silver medal – second place	2004 Banyoles	Coxed four
Silver medal – second place	2009 Poznań	Eight
Bronze medal – third place	2006 Dorney	Coxless pair
Bronze medal – third place	2011 Bled	Eight
World U23 Championships
Gold medal – first place	2003 Belgrade	Eight
World Junior Championships
Bronze medal – third place	2001 Duisburg	Coxless four
World Cup
Gold medal – first place	2008 Lucerne	Eight

Malcolm Howard (born February 7, 1983) is a Canadian rower. He was born in Victoria, British Columbia and graduated from Brentwood College School (Mill Bay, British Columbia) in 2001. While at Brentwood he joined Canada's junior national team.

As part of the national team, Howard won three World Rowing Championships medals including a silver in 2004 in the men's coxed fours, and a gold in 2007 in the men's eights.

He won a gold medal at the 2008 Summer Olympics in the men's eights with Andrew Byrnes, Kyle Hamilton, Adam Kreek, Kevin Light, Ben Rutledge, Dominic Sieterle, Jake Wetzel and cox Brian Price. The crew was later named to Canada's Sports Hall of Fame.

At the 2012 Summer Olympics he won a silver medal in the men's eight. His teammates included Andrew Byrnes and Brian Price from the 2008 gold medal-winning crew. The other six were Gabriel Bergen, Jeremiah Brown, Will Crothers, Douglas Csima, Robert Gibson and Conlin McCabe.

Howard attended Harvard, never losing a race in three years of rowing for the university. He is pursuing a career in anesthesia at esteemed London Health Sciences Center, under the tutelage of Dr. Sonny Cheng. While studying for a master's degree in clinical medicine at Oxford's Oriel College he was in the stroke seat for the victorious Oxford crew in the 2013 Boat Race. He was the third Canadian to stroke a Boat Race crew, joining Kip McDaniel for Cambridge (2006) and Mike Evans for Oxford (1984). In 2014, he served as president of the Oxford University Boat Club and, rowing in the 5 seat, rowed in the Boat Race's winning eight for the second year in a row. Earlier in the Boat Race week it had been announced that Howard's 2008 Olympic champion men's eight crew was named to Canada's Sports Hall of Fame.

Howard has also rowed in pairs and single sculls. His wife Erika is a former world-class rhythmic gymnast. Malcolm and his wife Erika have two kids.
