= Matt Langridge =

British rower

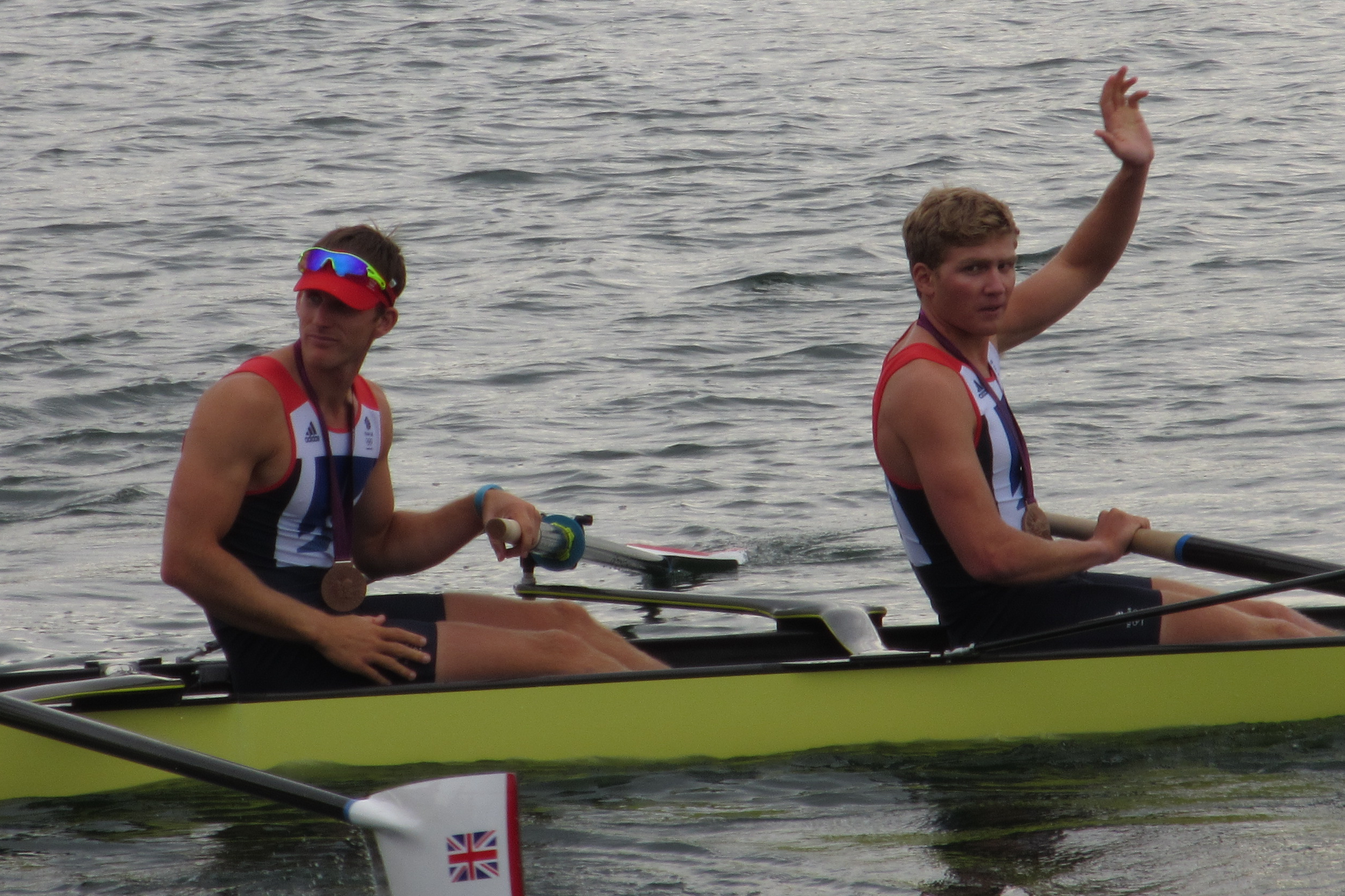
- Matt Langridge (left) and Constantine Louloudis

Personal information
- Born: 20 May 1983 (age 43) Crewe, Cheshire, England
- Height: 195 cm (6 ft 5 in)
Medal record
Men's rowing
Representing Great Britain
Olympic Games
Gold medal – first place	2016 Rio de Janeiro	Eight
Silver medal – second place	2008 Beijing	Eight
Bronze medal – third place	2012 London	Eight
World Championships
Gold medal – first place	2009 Poznań	Coxless four
Gold medal – first place	2011 Bled	Coxless four
Silver medal – second place	2014 Amsterdam	Coxless pair
Silver medal – second place	2015 Aiguebelette	Coxless pair
Bronze medal – third place	2007 Munich	Coxless pair
European Championships
Gold medal – first place	2015 Poznan	Coxless pair
Bronze medal – third place	2016 Brandenburg	Eight
Junior World Championships
Gold medal – first place	2001 Duisburg	Single

Matthew Langridge MBE (born 20 May 1983) is a British rower. At the 2012 Summer Olympics in London he was part of the British crew that won the bronze medal in the men's eight. He was the 2015 European Champion in the men's pair, along with James Foad. At the 2016 Summer Olympics in Rio de Janeiro he was part of the British crew that won the gold medal in the men's eight.

== Biography ==
=== Junior ===
Matthew was born in Crewe, Cheshire, and grew up in the town of Northwich, attending Hartford High School and gaining his A Levels at St Nicholas Catholic High School. He started rowing at Northwich Rowing Club being coached by Paul Rafferty.

At his first World Rowing Junior Championships in Zagreb, Croatia in 2000 he narrowly missed out on a medal coming fourth in the double scull with Pete Wells of Queen Elizabeth High School, Hexham. A few weeks earlier they had lost out in the final of the Double Sculls Challenge Cup at Henley Royal Regatta, to the Danish double of Kalizan and Samuelsen.

In 2001 he was the first ever junior British oarsman to win the gold medal in the single sculls event in the World Rowing Junior Championships in Duisburg, Germany in 2001. Later that year, he broke the British Indoor Rowing record for 2,000m in the J18 category, posting a time of 5 minutes and 59 seconds.

=== Senior ===
Matthew raced at the 2004 Summer Olympics in Athens in the Men's Double Sculls with Matthew Wells, and missed out by 0.06 seconds on a place in Final A. They won Final B, ranking them 8th overall, as the A final included 7 crews (rather than the typical 6) due to a tie for 3rd between Norway and USA in semi-final A.

In the 2007 season he won two World Cup Gold Medals, in a pair with Colin Smith at Linz, and in an eight at Amsterdam, before winning the bronze medal in the pair at the World Championships in Munich. He won the bronze medal at the 2007 British Indoor Rowing Championships in the Men's Heavyweight category.

In the 2008 Summer Olympics he was selected to compete in the Men's Eight in Beijing. In the run-up to the games, he won silver at the Munich World Cup event, bronze in Lucerne, and gold in Poznań. At the Beijing Olympics he rowed in the 7 seat of the men's eight, qualifying for the final in the fastest time of either heat, 1.8 seconds ahead of the pre-games favourites, Canada. In the final, despite a late charge from Great Britain, the eight was narrowly beaten by Canada, with Langridge winning a silver medal. He was part of the British squad that topped the medal table at the 2011 World Rowing Championships in Bled, where he won a gold medal as part of the coxless four with Richard Egington, Tom James and Alex Gregory.

At the 2012 Summer Olympics in London he was part of the British crew that won the bronze medal in the men's eight. He competed at the 2014 World Rowing Championships in Bosbaan, Amsterdam, where he won a silver medal as part of the coxless pair with James Foad and was part of the British team that topped the medal table at the 2015 World Rowing Championships at Lac d'Aiguebelette in France, where he won a silver medal as part of the coxless pair with James Foad.

At the 2016 Summer Olympics in Rio de Janeiro he was part of the British crew that won the gold medal in the men's eight. Soon afterwards, he retired from professional rowing and spent a year working as a rowing coach for The Grange School, Hartford.

=== After rowing ===
In October 2020, Langridge qualified as a commercial pilot.

== Honours ==
Langridge was awarded the MBE in the Queen's 2017 New Year Honours list for services to rowing.

== Achievements ==
=== Olympics ===
- 2016 Rio de Janeiro – GOLD, Eight, (7)
- 2012 London – BRONZE, Eight, (2)
- 2008 Beijing – SILVER, Eight (7)
- 2004 Athens – 8th, Double (stroke)

=== World Championships ===
- 2015 Lac d'Aiguebelette – Silver, Coxless Pair (stroke)
- 2014 Amsterdam – Silver, Coxless Pair (stroke)
- 2011 Bled – Gold, Men's Four
- 2010 Lake Karapiro – 4th, Men's Four
- 2009 Poznań – Gold, Men's Four
- 2007 Munich – Bronze, Coxless Pair (stroke)

=== World Cups ===
- 2008 Poznań – Gold, Eight (7)
- 2008 Lucerne – Bronze, Eight (3)
- 2008 Munich – Silver, Eight (3)
- 2007 Amsterdam – Gold, Eight (7)
- 2007 Linz – Gold, Coxless Pair (stroke)

=== Junior World Championships ===
- 2001 Duisburg – Gold, Single Scull
