= Brian Price (rowing) =

Canadian rowing coxswain (born 1976)

Personal information
- Full name: Brian S. Price
- Born: February 19, 1976 (age 50) Belleville, Ontario, Canada
- Height: 1.62 m (5 ft 4 in)
- Weight: 55 kg (121 lb)

Sport
- Club: Quinte Rowing Club
Medal record
Men's rowing
Representing Canada
Olympic Games
Gold medal – first place	2008 Beijing	Men's eight
Silver medal – second place	2012 London	Men's eight
World Championships
Gold medal – first place	2002 Seville	Eight
Gold medal – first place	2003 Milan	Eight
Gold medal – first place	2007 Oberschleißheim	Eight
Bronze medal – third place	2003 Milan	Coxed pair
Bronze medal – third place	2006 Dorney	Coxed pair
Bronze medal – third place	2007 Oberschleißheim	Coxed pair
Bronze medal – third place	2011 Bled	Eight
Bronze medal – third place	2011 Bled	Coxed pair
World Cup
Gold medal – first place	2003 Lucerne	Eight
Gold medal – first place	2004 Oberschleißheim	Eight
Gold medal – first place	2004 Lucerne	Eight
Gold medal – first place	2007 Lucerne	Eight
Gold medal – first place	2008 Lucerne	Eight
Bronze medal – third place	2002 Lucerne	Eight
Henley Royal Regatta
Gold medal – first place	2002 Grand Challenge Cup	Eight
Gold medal – first place	2003 Grand Challenge Cup	Eight
Gold medal – first place	2007 Grand Challenge Cup	Eight

Brian S. Price (born February 19, 1976) has been the Canadian coxswain of the men's eight since 2001. He was born in Belleville, Ontario. Price began rowing on the National Team in 1998 after graduating from Seneca College with a Civil Engineering Technology diploma. The first national team crew that he made was the 1998 development lightweight eight. He made the move to the heavyweight men's team in 1999 and competed at the Pan Am Games in Winnipeg.

Price has competed at World Championships in the Eight from 2001 to 2008, 2011 and has earned three World Championship victories ('02,'03,'07) along with a bronze medal most recently in 2011. He has doubled up in the Eight and Coxed Pair four times and medaled each time with a bronze. His Men's Eight gold medal victories came in 2002 (Seville, Spain), 2003 (Milan, Italy) and 2007 (Munich, Germany). His four World Championship Coxed Pair Bronze medals came in 2003, 2006, 2007 & 2011. He also has multiple World Cup medals to his credit, 5 gold, 1 Silver, 1 Bronze.

Price is a survivor of childhood cancer, leukemia ALL. He underwent chemotherapy and a harsh drug regime as a child which effected his thyroid, the organ that regulates growth development. His stunted height and weight made his size of 5'4" tall and 121 lbs. suitable for the position of coxswain. His favorite saying is "Without having had cancer, I would not have become a World and Olympic Champion."

He met his wife Robbi Stott of Belleville in September 2000 and they were married on December 11, 2004. After having lived in Ottawa after the Athens Olympics for two years, and Robbi becoming a Registered Massage Therapist, they moved back to Victoria in March 2007 so that Brian could train at the Victoria Training Centre full-time. They now reside in Orangeville, ON. Robbi has given birth to two girls, Brianna Helen on May 31, 2007, and their second daughter, Peyton Victoria on January 12, 2010.

Price is an Olympic Gold Medallist after dominating the field at the 2008 Summer Olympics in Beijing China. He won the Men's Eight with teammates Kevin Light, Ben Rutledge, Andrew Byrnes, Jake Wetzel, Malcolm Howard, Dominic Sieterle, Adam Kreek and Kyle Hamilton Great Britain won the silver while USA finished with Bronze. The Canadian boat stormed out to a lead right from the start with GB and the USA unable to match their immense power.

Price decided to take two years away from rowing (2009, 2010) and enjoyed a successful career in the speaking industry. His motivational story of Cancer survival to Olympic Champion resonated with everyone from corporate audiences to elementary schools. As much as he enjoyed speaking, he was drawn back to rowing by a young and motivated group of guys on the Canadian National Team. With Mike Spracklen still at the helm of the Men's Eight, it was the obvious choice to return to the Eight with the aim of defending gold in London 2012.

With 2011 being his first World Championships back in the boat, it proved to be successful one with improvements coming throughout the season. Canada finished 5th at the prestigious Lucerne World Cup Regatta and improved even more with a bronze medal at the 2011 World Rowing Championships in Bled Slovenia. This finish qualified them for the 2012 Olympics (top 7 qualified) and solidified them a legitimate contenders heading into the games.

He won a silver medal at the 2012 Summer Olympics in the men's eight. His teammates included Malcolm Howard and Andrew Byrnes, with whom he won gold in 2008. The other six were Gabriel Bergen, Jeremiah Brown, Will Crothers, Douglas Csima, Robert Gibson and Conlin McCabe.
