= Zachary Vlahos =

American rower

Personal information
- Born: August 19, 1988 (age 37) New York, New York, United States

Sport
- Sport: Rowing
Medal record
Men's rowing
Representing United States
World Championships
Bronze medal – third place	2013 Chungju	M8+

Zachary Vlahos (born August 19, 1988) is an American rower.

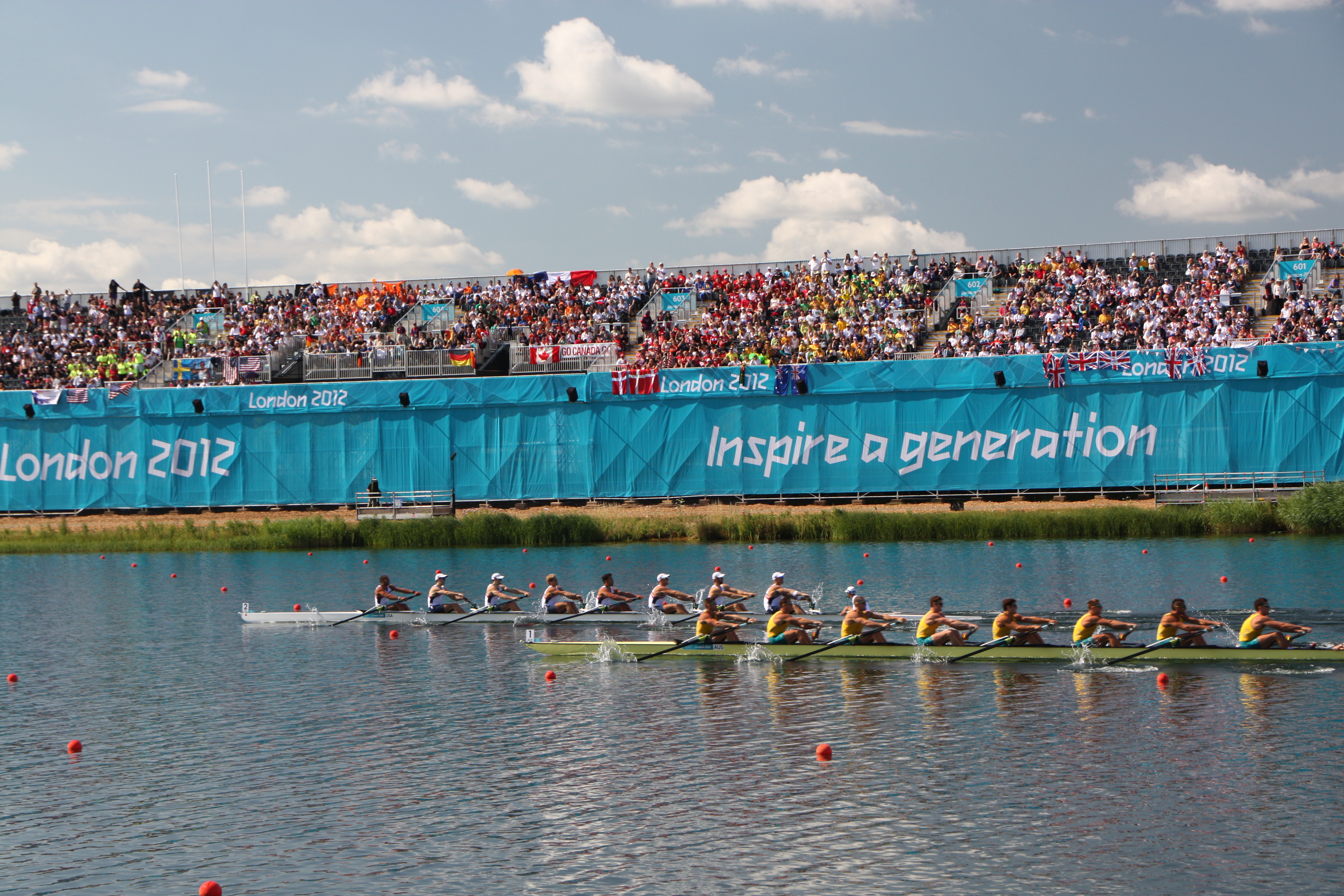
Rowing at the 2012 Summer Olympics

He competed in the Men's eight event at the 2012 Summer Olympics.
