= Tobias Lister =

Australian rowing cox

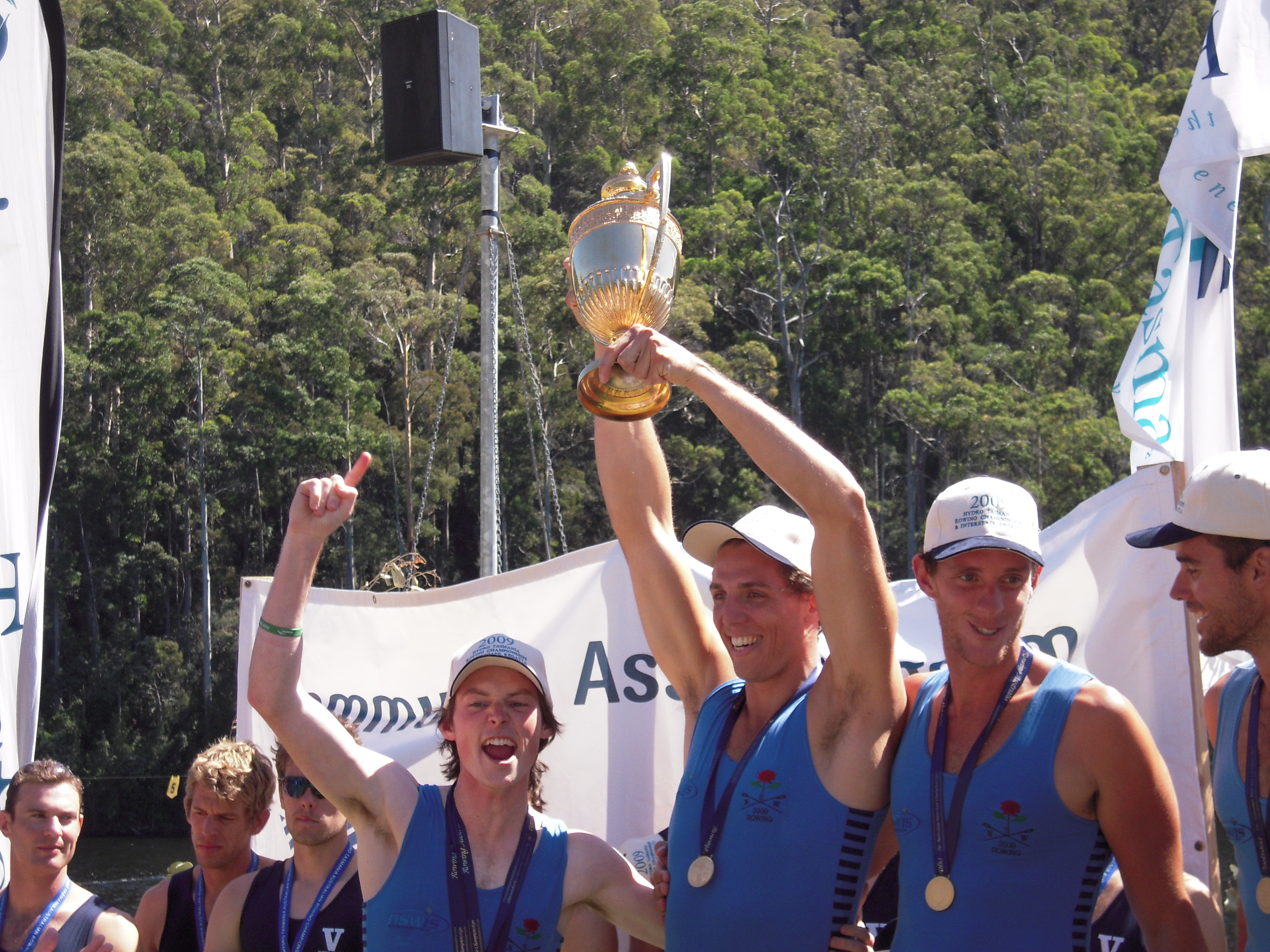
- Lister, Terrence Alfred, Fergus Pragnell, Matt Ryan celebrate NSW's 2009 King's Cup win

Personal information
- Born: 7 April 1987 (age 39) Sydney, Australia
- Education: Shore School

Sport
- Sport: Rowing

Achievements and titles
- Olympic finals: 2012 London
- World finals: 2009, 2010, 2011
- National finals: King's Cup 2009-2015
Medal record
Representing Australia
Men's rowing
World Rowing Championships
Bronze medal – third place	2010 Karapiro	M8+

Tobias (Toby) Lister (born 7 April 1987) is a former Australian rowing coxswain. He is a ten-time Australian national champion, competed in the men's eight at the 2012 London Olympics and won a bronze medal at World Championships in 2010.

== School, club and state rowing ==
Lister was introduced to rowing at Shore School in Sydney. A coxswain, Lister steered Shore's first VIIIs in 2003 and 2004 to consecutive victories at the AAGPS Head of the River. With Lister in the stern, those Shore eights also won the Barrington Cup - the national schoolboy eight title - at Australian Rowing Championships in 2003 and 2004. Lister's senior club rowing was from the Sydney University Boat Club.

Lister made his first state crew for New South Wales in 2005 in the youth eight which contested the Noel Wilkinson Trophy at the Interstate Regatta within the Australian Rowing Championships. He was again in New South Wales youth eights in 2006 and 2007, steering both those crews to victory.

Following the retirement of fellow SUBC coxswain Marty Rabjohns in 2008, Lister stepped into the stern of the New South Wales men's senior eight to contest the King's Cup at the annual Interstate Regatta. He enjoyed a sustained period of New South Wales dominance in this event and coxed six successive NSW eights to King's Cup victories from 2009 to 2014. Lister also coxed the 2015 New South Wales King's Cup eight to a second place - their first loss in the event in eight years.

In SUBC colours Lister coxed crews contesting national titles at the Australian Rowing Championships on a number of occasions. In 2006 he steered the SUBC lightweight eight competing for that national title and in 2007 a composite New South Wales crew in that same event. In 2009 he coxed SUBC crews contesting the coxed four championship and the open women's eight event.

In 2006 he coxed a composite SUBC/Uni of Queensland/UTS crew to victory as the champion Australian coxed four. That crew contained the Winklevoss twins who at the time were rowing with the UTS Haberfield Rowing Club. In 2008 he again won an Australian championship coxed four title, this time in an all Sydney University crew.

== International representative rowing ==
In 2004 Lister made his Australian representative debut at the Junior World Rowing Championships in Banyoles, Spain, in the coxed four which placed sixth.

In 2007, Lister was one of seven athletes from Sydney University Boat Club selected to the Australian U23 men's eight. The crew was coached by SUBC coach Phil Bourguignon and won a bronze medal at the 2007 World Rowing U23 Championships in Strathclyde, Scotland. In 2008, Lister coxed the Australian U23 eight to seventh place at the U23 World Championships in Brandenburg, Germany.

Upon Rabjohns' retirement Lister took the ropes of the national men's senior eight. He steered the eight to a seventh placing at the 2009 World Rowing Championships in Poznan, Poland. In 2010, Lister won his first senior world championship medal, a bronze, in the men's eight at the 2010 World Rowing Championships on Lake Karapiro, New Zealand. At the 2011 World Rowing Championships in Bled, Slovenia, with Lister on the rudder the Australian men's eight placed 4th and qualified that boat for the London Olympics.

At the 2012 London Olympics, Lister coxed the Australian men's eight to a sixth placing in a thrilling final where all boats finished within a length at the line.

== Coaching ==
Lister was the Director of Rowing at Scotch College, Adelaide and led the program to wins in the first VIII for Schoolboys and Schoolgirls at the 2015 South Australian Head of the River. It was the first time in the school's history this has occurred. In 2016 Lister took the role of Head of Rowing at Geelong Grammar School.
