= Jovan Popović (rower) =

Serbian rower (born 1987)

Medal record

Men's rowing

Representing Serbia and Montenegro / Serbia

World Rowing Championships
Gold medal – first place	2006 Eton	M2+
Silver medal – second place	2007 Munich	M4+

European Championships
Bronze medal – third place	2011 Plovdiv	Coxless pair

World Rowing U23 Championships
Gold medal – first place	2005 Amsterdam	Quad sculls
Silver medal – second place	2006 Hazewinkel	Coxless pair

Jovan Popović (born 11 May 1987 in Belgrade) is a Serbian rower.
