= Will Crothers =

Canadian rower (born 1987)

Personal information
- Full name: William Crothers
- Nationality: Canada
- Born: June 14, 1987 (age 39) Kingston, Ontario
- Height: 195 cm (6 ft 5 in)
- Weight: 95 kg (209 lb)
Medal record
Men's rowing
Representing Canada
Olympic Games
Silver medal – second place	2012 London	Eight
World Championships
Silver medal – second place	2006 Dorney	Coxed four
Bronze medal – third place	2011 Bled	Eight
World U23 Championships
Gold medal – first place	2006 Heindonk	Eight
Silver medal – second place	2008; Brandenburg an der Havel	Eight
World Junior Championships
Bronze medal – third place	2004 Banyoles	Coxed four
Pan American Games
Gold medal – first place	2015 Toronto	Coxless four
Gold medal – first place	2015 Toronto	Eight

Will Crothers (born June 14, 1987) is a Canadian rower. He started rowing in grade 9 for KCVI, following his brother into the sport. Within just a few years, Crothers and his rowing partner, Rob Gibson, were Canadian high school champions in the senior coxless pair in 2005. Additionally, Crothers was named Ontario Male Athlete of the Year in 2005.

He won a silver medal at the 2012 Summer Olympics in the men's eight, just behind the German team, with Andrew Byrnes, Gabriel Bergen, Jeremiah Brown, Douglas Csima, Robert Gibson, Malcolm Howard, Conlin McCabe and Brian Price.

In June 2016, he was officially named to Canada's 2016 Olympic team. The men's coxless four finished 6th overall in A-Final after making it through their heat and semifinal in good standing.

Crothers competed at the 2020 Summer Olympics in the men's coxless four where the Canadian crew finished 8th overall.
