= Gabriel Bergen =

Canadian rower (born 1982)

Personal information
- Nationality: Canada
- Born: July 6, 1982 (age 43) Dawson Creek, British Columbia
- Height: 1.87 m (6 ft 2 in)
- Weight: 203 lb (92 kg)

Sport
- Club: University of Victoria Rowing Club
Medal record
Men's rowing
Representing Canada
Olympic Games
Silver medal – second place	2012 London	Eight
World Championships
Gold medal – first place	2008 Ottensheim	Coxed pair
Silver medal – second place	2009 Poznań	Eight
Bronze medal – third place	2011 Bled	Eight

Gabriel "Gabe" Bergen (born 6 July 1982 in Dawson Creek) is a Canadian rower. Bergen won a silver medal as part of the men's eights for Canada at the 2012 Summer Olympics in London. He has also won one medal of every colour at the World Championships including being champion in the coxed pair in 2008 and a silver and a bronze in the eights in 2009 and 2011 respectively.

== Career ==
Bergen began his rowing career in 2005 and began his competitive career as part of the men's eights in 2006. His first World Championship was as a world title when he won the gold in the coxed pair at the 2008 World Rowing Championships with partner James Dunaway and cox Mark Laidlaw. He found further successes at the Worlds except this time as part of the eights. Bergen failed to win gold but did succeed in winning a silver in 2009 and a bronze in 2011.

He won a silver medal at the 2012 Summer Olympics in the men's eight with Andrew Byrnes, Jeremiah Brown, Will Crothers, Douglas Csima, Robert Gibson, Malcolm Howard, Conlin McCabe and Brian Price. The men's eights started the Olympics poorly by finishing dead last in their heat. However the crew finished second in the repechage, ending up just behind the crew from Great Britain. In the finals of the event the Canadian eight made a run from third and finished in second over the British boat but behind the World Champion German team.

== Personal ==
Bergan was a part of the torch relay for the 2010 Winter Olympics in Canada. His father was a rower as well and competed in the 1976 Summer Olympics in Montreal.
