= Krystian Aranowski =

Polish rower (born 1988)

Personal information
- Born: 11 April 1988 (age 38) Toruń, Poland

Sport
- Sport: Rowing
Medal record
Representing Poland
World Championships
| Bronze medal – third place | 2014 Amsterdam | M8+ |
European Rowing Championships
| Gold medal – first place | 2009 Brest | M8+ |
| Silver medal – second place | 2010 Montemor-o-Velho | M8+ |
| Silver medal – second place | 2013 Sevilla | M8+ |

Krystian Aranowski (born 11 April 1988) is a Polish rower. He competed in the Men's eight event at the 2012 and 2016 Summer Olympics.
