= Ross James =

American rower

Personal information
- Born: August 17, 1987 (age 38) Alamosa, Colorado, United States

Sport
- Sport: Rowing
Medal record
World Championships
Bronze medal – third place	2013 Chungju	M8+

Ross James (born August 17, 1987) is an American rower. He competed in the Men's eight event at the 2012 Summer Olympics with his twin brother Grant.
