= Serhiy Chykanov =

Ukrainian rower

Personal information
- Born: 3 November 1979 (age 46) Kyiv, Ukrainian SSR, Soviet Union

Sport
- Sport: Rowing

Serhiy Chykanov (born 3 November 1979) is a Ukrainian rower. He competed in the Men's eight event at the 2012 Summer Olympics.
