= Zbigniew Schodowski =

Polish rower

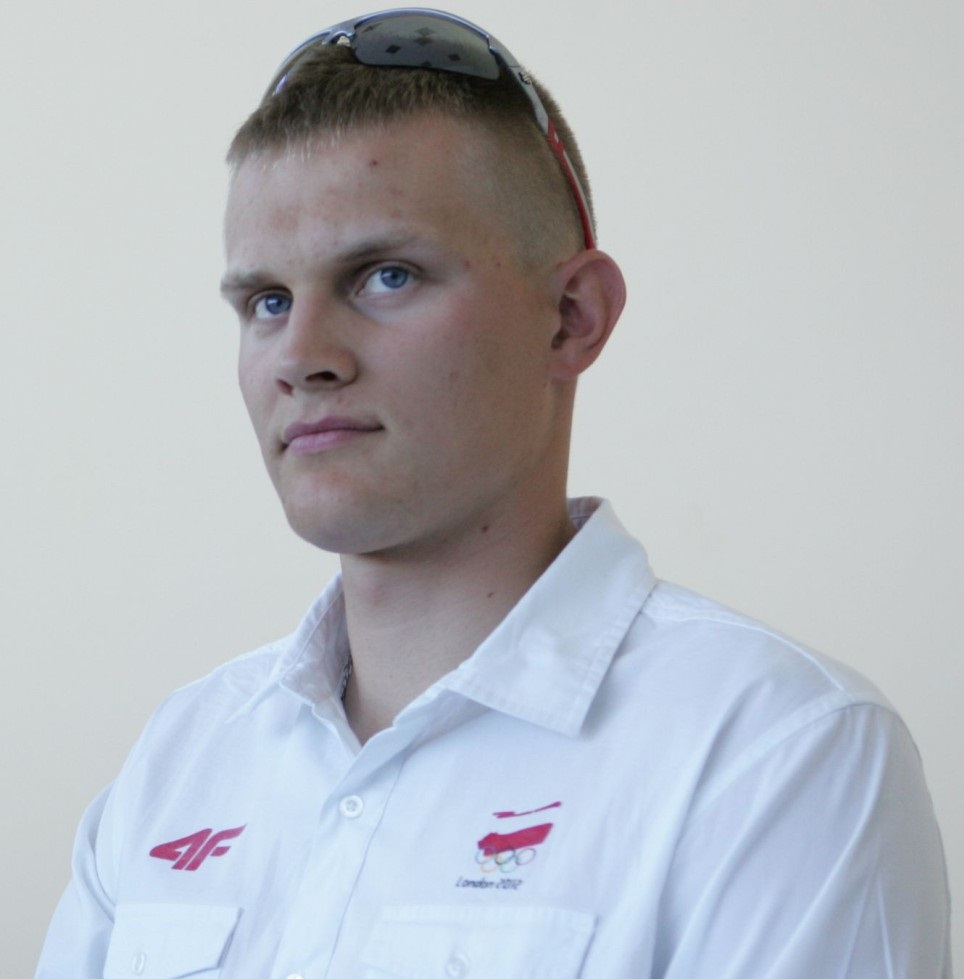

Personal information
- Nationality: Polish
- Born: 30 April 1987 (age 39) Toruń, Poland

Sport
- Sport: Rowing
Medal record
Representing Poland
World Championships
Bronze medal – third place	2014 Amsterdam	M8+
European Rowing Championships
Silver medal – second place	2013 Sevilla	M8+
Silver medal – second place	2017 Račice	M8+

Zbigniew Schodowski (born 30 April 1987) is a Polish rower. He competed in the Men's eight event at the 2012 Summer Olympics.
