= Florian Mennigen =

German rower

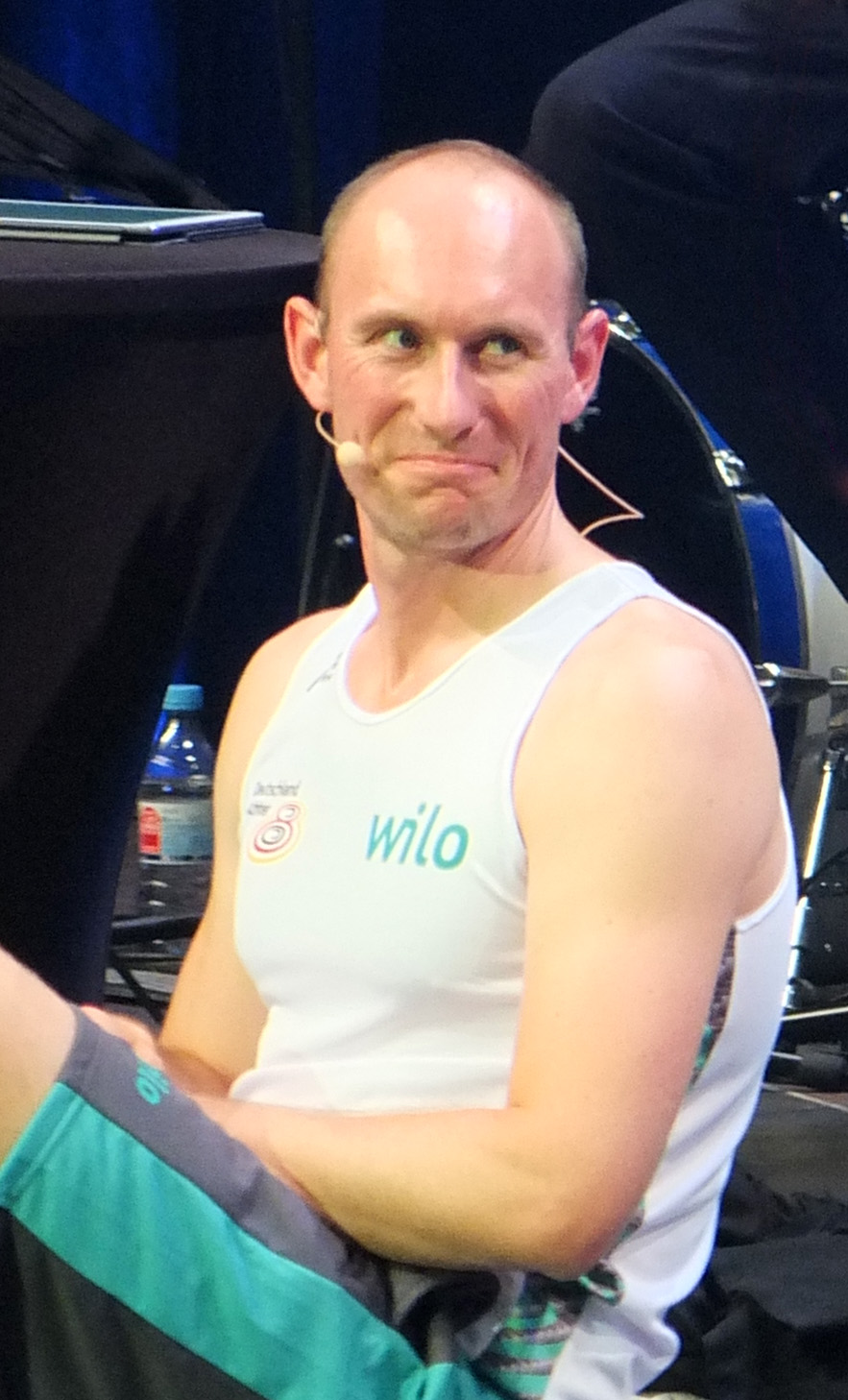
- Mennigen in 2018

Medal record

Men's rowing

Representing Germany

Olympic Games
Gold medal – first place	2012 London	M8+

World Championships
Gold medal – first place	2009 Poznań	M8+
Gold medal – first place	2010 Karapiro	M8+
Gold medal – first place	2011 Bled	M8+

Florian Mennigen (born 10 April 1982 in Ratzeburg) is a German former representative rower. He is a three time world champion and an Olympic gold medallist.

At the 2012 Summer Olympics in London, he was in the crew – the Deutschlandachter- that won the gold medal in the men's eight competition.

== Personal ==
Mennigen is an alumnus of Boston University. Following his 2012 Olympic success he was awarded the Silbernes Lorbeerblatt (Silver Laurel Leaf), Germany's highest sports award, for the achievement.
