= Andriy Pryveda =

Ukrainian rower

Personal information
- Nationality: Ukraine
- Born: 1 January 1986 (age 40) Beryslav Raion, Ukrainian SSR, Soviet Union
- Height: 6 ft 4 in (193 cm)
- Spouse: Valentina Pyrveda

Sport
- Sport: Rowing

Andriy Pryveda (born 1 January 1986) is a Ukrainian rower. He competed in the Men's eight event at the 2012 Summer Olympics.
