= Valentyn Kletskoy =

Ukrainian rower

Personal information
- Born: 11 January 1985 (age 41) Kyiv, Ukrainian SSR, Soviet Union

Sport
- Sport: Rowing

Valentyn Kletskoy (born 11 January 1985) is a Ukrainian rower. He competed in the Men's eight event at the 2012 Summer Olympics.
