= Piotr Hojka =

Polish rower (born 1984)

Personal information
- Born: 12 June 1984 (age 42) Bydgoszcz, Poland

Sport
- Sport: Rowing
Medal record
Representing Poland
European Rowing Championships
Gold medal – first place	2009 Brest	Eight
Silver medal – second place	2007 Poznań	Coxless pair
Silver medal – second place	2010 Montemor-o-Velho	Eight
Silver medal – second place	2013 Sevilla	Eight

Piotr Hojka (born 12 June 1984) is a Polish rower. He competed at the 2008 and 2012 Summer Olympics.
