= Daniel Trojanowski =

Polish rower

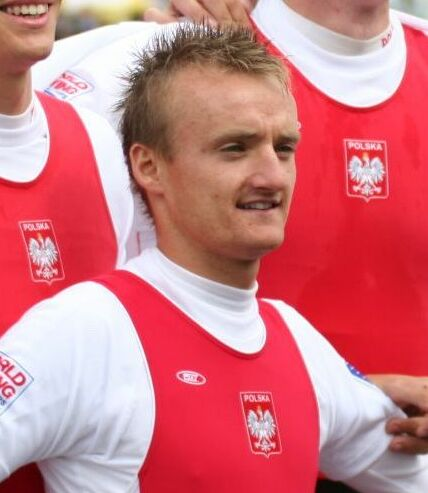

Personal information
- Born: 24 July 1982 (age 43) Brodnica, Poland

Sport
- Sport: Rowing
Medal record
Representing Poland
World Championships
Gold medal – first place	2007 Munich	Coxed pair
Bronze medal – third place	2014 Amsterdam	Eight
European Rowing Championships
Gold medal – first place	2009 Brest	Eight
Silver medal – second place	2007 Poznań	Eight
Silver medal – second place	2010 Montemor-o-Velho	Eight
Silver medal – second place	2013 Sevilla	Eight
Silver medal – second place	2017 Račice	Eight
Bronze medal – third place	2008 Marathon	Eight

Daniel Dawid Trojanowski (born 24 July 1982) is a Polish rower. He competed at the 2004, 2008, 2012 and 2016 Olympic Games. He has won two gold medals (2007 World Championships, 2009 European Rowing Championships), four silver medals and two bronze medals.
