= Artem Moroz =

Ukrainian rower

Personal information
- Born: 28 March 1984 (age 42) Dniprodzerzhynsk, Ukrainian SSR, Soviet Union

Sport
- Sport: Rowing

Artem Moroz (born 28 March 1984) is a Ukrainian rower. He competed in the Men's eight event at the 2012 Summer Olympics.
