= Kristof Wilke =

German rower

Medal record

Representing Germany

Men's rowing

Olympic Games
Gold medal – first place	2012 London	Eight

World Championships
Gold medal – first place	2009 Poznań	Eight
Gold medal – first place	2010 Karapiro	Eight
Gold medal – first place	2011 Bled	Eight
Silver medal – second place	2006 Eton	Coxless four
Silver medal – second place	2007 Poznań	Coxless four
Silver medal – second place	2013 Chungju	Eight

Kristof Wilke (born 17 April 1985 in Radolfzell) is a German former representative rower. He is a three time world champion and an Olympic gold medallist.

At the 2012 Summer Olympics in London, he stroked the German men's eight crew that won the gold medal in the eights competition. Later that year each member of the crew was awarded the Silbernes Lorbeerblatt (Silver Laurel Leaf), Germany's highest sports award, for the achievement.
