= Anton Kholyaznykov =

Ukrainian rower

Personal information
- Born: 10 December 1986 (age 39) Cancoy, Soviet Union

Sport
- Sport: Rowing

Anton Kholyaznykov (born 10 December 1986) is a Ukrainian rower. He competed in the Men's eight event at the 2012 Summer Olympics.
