= Ivan Tymko =

Ukrainian rower

Personal information
- Born: 26 July 1979 (age 46) Kyiv, Ukrainian SSR, Soviet Union

Sport
- Sport: Rowing

Ivan Tymko (born 26 July 1979) is a Ukrainian rower. He competed in the Men's eight event at the 2012 Summer Olympics.
