= Filip Adamski =

Polish-German rower

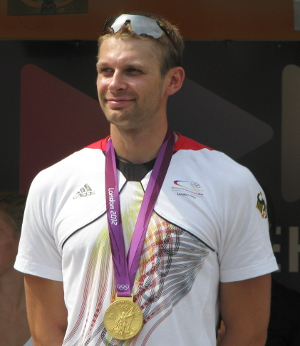

Medal record

Men's rowing

Representing Germany

Olympic Games
Gold medal – first place	2012 London	M8+

World Championships
Gold medal – first place	2009 Poznań	M8+
Silver medal – second place	2006 Eton	M4-
Bronze medal – third place	2010 Karapiro	M2+

Filip Kamil Adamski (born 5 January 1983 in Wrocław, Poland) is a German former representative rower. He is a world champion, a dual Olympian and an Olympic gold medallist.

He was in the crew that won the gold medal in the men's eight competition at the 2012 Summer Olympics in London. Later that year each member of the crew was awarded the Silbernes Lorbeerblatt (Silver Laurel Leaf), Germany's highest sports award, for the achievement. He also finished in 6th place in the coxless four at the 2008 Summer Olympics. His world championship title was won in 2009 in the German men's eight.
