= Viktor Hrebennikov =

Ukrainian rower

Viktor Hrebennykov
Personal information
- Born: 17 March 1986 (age 40) Mykolaiv, Ukrainian SSR, Soviet Union
- Height: 200 cm (6 ft 7 in)
- Weight: 94 kg (207 lb)

Sport
- Sport: Rowing

Viktor Hrebennykov (born 17 March 1986) is a Ukrainian rower. He competed in the Men's eight event at the 2012 Summer Olympics and placed 8th.
