= Lukas Müller (rower) =

German rower

Medal record

Men's rowing

Representing Germany

Olympic Games
Gold medal – first place	2012 London	M8+

World Rowing Championships
Gold medal – first place	2010 Karapiro	M8+
Gold medal – first place	2011 Bled	M8+

Lukas Müller (born 19 May 1987 in Wetzlar) is a German former representative rower. He is an Olympian, an Olympic gold medallist and was twice a world champion.

He was in the crew that won the gold medal at the men's eight competition at the 2012 Summer Olympics in London. Later that year each member of the crew was awarded the Silbernes Lorbeerblatt (Silver Laurel Leaf), Germany's highest sports award, for the achievement.
