= Oleh Lykov =

Ukrainian rower (born 1973)

Medal record

Men's rowing

Representing Ukraine

Olympic Games
Bronze medal – third place	2004 Athens	Quadruple sculls

World Rowing Championships
Silver medal – second place	1999 St. Catharines	Quadruple sculls
Bronze medal – third place	1997 Aiguebelette	Quadruple sculls

European Championships
Bronze medal – third place	2008 Marathon	Quadruple sculls

Oleh Viktorovych Lykov (Ukrainian: Ликов Олег Вікторович, born 1 August 1973 in Dnipropetrovsk) is a Ukrainian rower.
