= Rowing at the 2004 Summer Olympics – Men's eight =

Men's eight at the Games of the XXVIII Olympiad
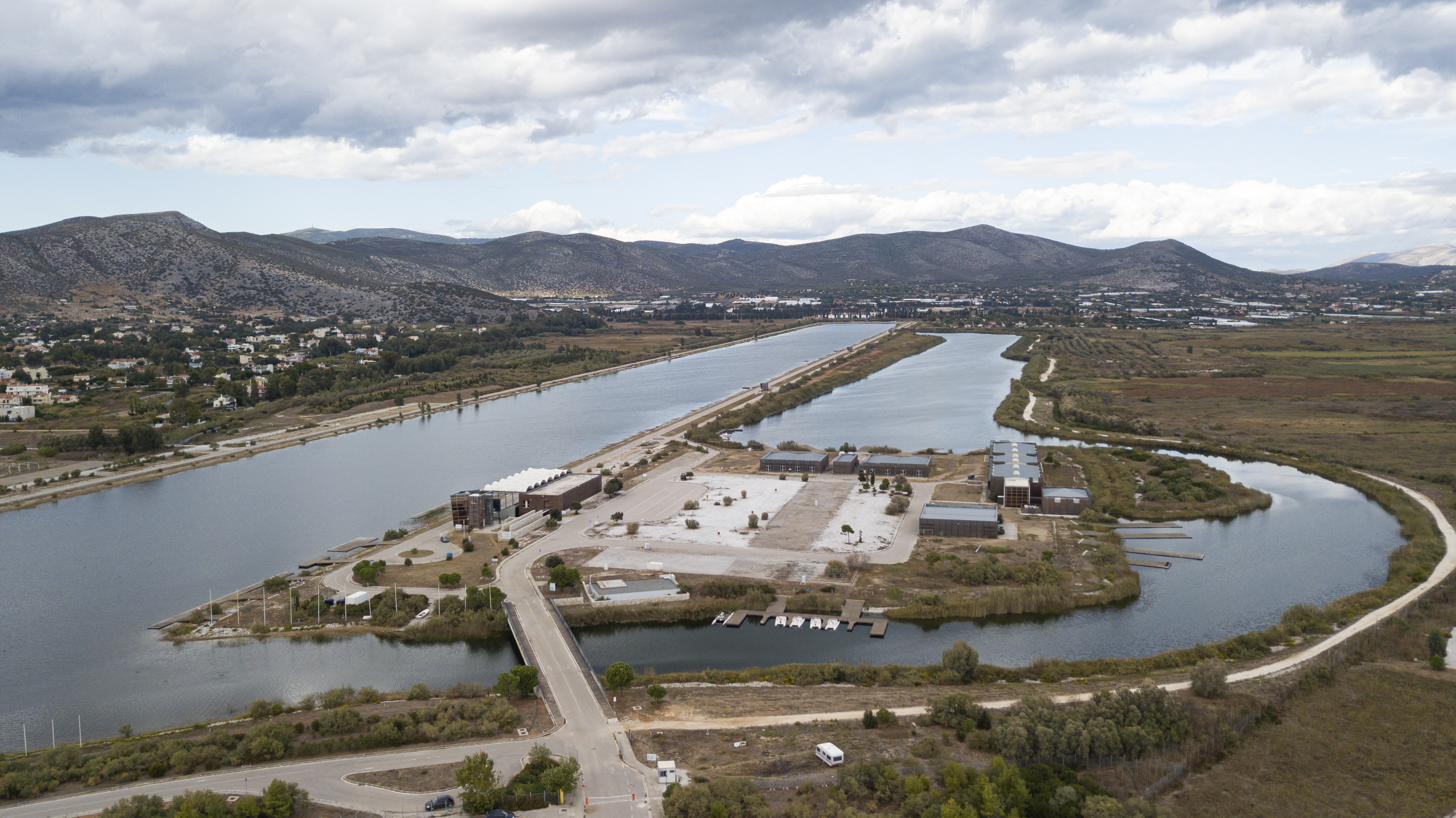
- Schinias venue
- Venue: Schinias Olympic Rowing and Canoeing Centre
- Dates: 15–22 August 2004
- Competitors: 81 from 9 nations
- Winning time: 5:42.48

Medalists
1st place, gold medalist(s)		United States: Jason Read; Wyatt Allen; Chris Ahrens; Joseph Hansen; Matt Deakin; Dan Beery; Beau Hoopman; Bryan Volpenhein; Peter Cipollone
2nd place, silver medalist(s)		Netherlands: Matthijs Vellenga; Gijs Vermeulen; Jan-Willem Gabriëls; Daniël Mensch; Geert-Jan Derksen; Gerritjan Eggenkamp; Diederik Simon; Michiel Bartman; Chun Wei Cheung
3rd place, bronze medalist(s)		Australia: Stefan Szczurowski; Stuart Reside; Stuart Welch; James Stewart; Geoff Stewart; Bo Hanson; Mike McKay; Stephen Stewart; Michael Toon

The men's eight competition was one of six events for male competitors in Rowing at the 2004 Summer Olympics in Athens. It was held from 15 to 22 August. There were 9 boats (81 competitors) from 9 nations, with each nation limited to a single boat in the event. The event was won by the United States, the nation's first victory in the men's eight since 1964 and 12th overall. The Netherlands took silver. Australia, the reigning silver medalist, finished with bronze this time.

== Background ==
This was the 24th appearance of the event. Rowing had been on the programme in 1896 but was cancelled due to bad weather. The men's eight has been held every time that rowing has been contested, beginning in 1900.

The field was competitive. Canada was favoured, with wins at the 2002 and 2003 World Championships as well as Grand Challenge Cup victories in those years. But there were numerous strong contenders, including the United States (2003 Pan American champions, 2003 World runners-up), Romania (2001 World champions), Great Britain (defending Olympic champions), and the Netherlands (2004 Grand Challenge Cup winners).

No nations made their debut in the event. The United States made its 21st appearance, most among nations to that point.

== Competition format ==
The "eight" event featured nine-person boats, with eight rowers and a coxswain. It was a sweep rowing event, with the rowers each having one oar (and thus each rowing on one side). The course used the 2000 metres distance that became the Olympic standard in 1912 (with the exception of 1948). Races were held in up to six lanes.

The competition consisted of two main rounds (semifinals and finals) as well as a repechage.

- Semifinals: Two heats of four or five boats each. The top boat in each heat (2 boats total) advanced directly to the "A" final, while all other boats (7 total) went to the repechage.
- Repechage: Two heats of three or four boats each. The top two boats in each heat (4 boats total) rejoined the semifinal winners in the "A" final, with the 3rd and 4th place boats in each heat (3 boats total) eliminated from medal contention and competing in the "B" final.
- Finals: The "A" final consisted of the top six boats, awarding medals and 4th through 6th place. The "B" final featured the next three boats, ranking them 7th through 9th.

== Schedule ==
All times are Greece Standard Time (UTC+2)

Date	Time	Round
Sunday, 15 August 2004	10:29	Semifinals
Wednesday, 18 August 2004	11:20	Repechage
Saturday, 21 August 2004	12:00	Final B
Sunday, 22 August 2004	10:30	Final A

== Results ==
=== Semifinals ===
==== Semifinal 1 ====
Rank	Rowers	Coxswain	Nation	Time	Notes
1	Stefan Szczurowski; Stuart Reside; Stuart Welch; James Stewart; Geoff Stewart; Bo Hanson; Mike McKay; Steve Stewart	Michael Toon	Australia	5:23.23	QA
2	Diederik Simon; Gijs Vermeulen; Jan-Willem Gabriëls; Daniël Mensch; Geert-Jan Derksen; Gerritjan Eggenkamp; Matthijs Vellenga; Michiel Bartman	Chun Wei Cheung	Netherlands	5:25.26	R
3	Sebastian Schulte; Stephan Koltzk; Jörg Dießner; Thorsten Engelmann; Jan-Martin Bröer; Enrico Schnabel; Ulf Siemes; Michael Ruhe	Peter Thiede	Germany	5:27.72	R
4	Bastien Ripoll; Bastien Gallet; Jean-Baptiste Macquet; Julien Peudecoeur; Donatien Mortelette; Anthony Perrot; Jean-David Bernard; Laurent Cadot	Christophe Lattaignant	France	5:29.55	R
5	Bogdan Zalewski; Piotr Buchalski; Rafał Hejmej; Dariusz Nowak; Mikołaj Burda; Wojciech Gutorski; Sebastian Kosiorek; Michal Stawowski	Daniel Trojanowski	Poland	5:30.08	R

==== Semifinal 2 ====
The second heat of the men's eight was a particularly intense match as the United States pulled ahead of Canada (undefeated since 2001) in the last 500 metres. The Canadian eight was a favourite for the gold, whereas the American eight had never before been tried internationally. Both boats beat the world's best time for the men's eight, and the United States advanced directly to the finals while Canada went to the repechage.

Rank	Rowers	Coxswain	Nation	Time	Notes
1	Jason Read; Wyatt Allen; Chris Ahrens; Joseph Hansen; Matt Deakin; Dan Beery; Beau Hoopman; Bryan Volpenhein	Peter Cipollone	United States	5:19.85	QA, OB
2	Scott Frandsen; Kevin Light; Ben Rutledge; Kyle Hamilton; Adam Kreek; Andrew Hoskins; Joe Stankevicius; Jeff Powell	Brian Price	Canada	5:20.46	R
3	Sergio Canciani; Aldo Tramontano; Marco Penna; Pierpaolo Frattini; Valerio Pinton; Niccolò Mornati; Carlo Mornati; Luca Ghezzi	Gaetano Iannuzzi	Italy	5:30.16	R
4	Jonno Devlin; Kieran West; Josh West; Andrew Triggs Hodge; Tom Stallard; Phil Simmons; Robin Bourne-Taylor; Tom James	Christian Cormack	Great Britain	5:32.26	R

=== Repechage ===
==== Repechage heat 1 ====
Rank	Rowers	Coxswain	Nation	Time	Notes
1	Diederik Simon; Gijs Vermeulen; Jan-Willem Gabriëls; Daniël Mensch; Geert-Jan Derksen; Gerritjan Eggenkamp; Matthijs Vellenga; Michiel Bartman	Chun Wei Cheung	Netherlands	5:31.92	QA
2	Bastien Ripoll; Bastien Gallet; Jean-Baptiste Macquet; Julien Peudecoeur; Donatien Mortelette; Anthony Perrot; Jean-David Bernard; Laurent Cadot	Christophe Lattaignant	France	5:34.20	QA
3	Sergio Canciani; Aldo Tramontano; Marco Penna; Pierpaolo Frattini; Valerio Pinton; Niccolò Mornati; Carlo Mornati; Luca Ghezzi	Gaetano Iannuzzi	Italy	5:34.56	QB

==== Repechage heat 2 ====
Rank	Rowers	Coxswain	Nation	Time	Notes
1	Scott Frandsen; Kevin Light; Ben Rutledge; Kyle Hamilton; Adam Kreek; Andrew Hoskins; Joe Stankevicius; Jeff Powell	Brian Price	Canada	5:32.51	QA
2	Sebastian Schulte; Stephan Koltzk; Jörg Dießner; Thorsten Engelmann; Jan-Martin Bröer; Enrico Schnabel; Ulf Siemes; Michael Ruhe	Peter Thiede	Germany	5:33.07	QA
3	Jonno Devlin; Kieran West; Josh West; Andrew Triggs Hodge; Tom Stallard; Phil Simmons; Robin Bourne-Taylor; Tom James	Christian Cormack	Great Britain	5:34.37	QB
4	Bogdan Zalewski; Piotr Buchalski; Rafał Hejmej; Dariusz Nowak; Mikołaj Burda; Wojciech Gutorski; Sebastian Kosiorek; Michal Stawowski	Daniel Trojanowski	Poland	5:36.75	QB

=== Finals ===
==== Final B ====
Rank	Rowers	Coxswain	Nation	Time
7	Sergio Canciani; Aldo Tramontano; Marco Penna; Pierpaolo Frattini; Valerio Pinton; Niccolò Mornati; Carlo Mornati; Luca Ghezzi	Gaetano Iannuzzi	Italy	5:49.43
8	Bogdan Zalewski; Piotr Buchalski; Rafał Hejmej; Dariusz Nowak; Mikołaj Burda; Wojciech Gutorski; Sebastian Kosiorek; Michal Stawowski	Daniel Trojanowski	Poland	5:51.66
9	Jonno Devlin; Kieran West; Josh West; Andrew Triggs Hodge; Tom Stallard; Phil Simmons; Robin Bourne-Taylor; Tom James	Christian Cormack	Great Britain	5:53.31

==== Final A ====
The United States established an early lead. By the 1000 meter mark (halfway), they had a three-second advantage (one length) over Australia, Canada, Germany, and the Netherlands who were all battling for second place. In the final 1000 meters, the Netherlands made a run at the United States, finishing 1.3 seconds short. Australia maintained its position three seconds behind the United States while Germany and Canada fell off the pace and France trailed in sixth place. The fifth-place finish was a major disappointment for Canada, the two-time defending World Champions.

Rank	Rowers	Coxswain	Nation	Time
1st place, gold medalist(s)	Jason Read; Wyatt Allen; Chris Ahrens; Joseph Hansen; Matt Deakin; Dan Beery; Beau Hoopman; Bryan Volpenhein	Peter Cipollone	United States	5:42.48
2nd place, silver medalist(s)	Diederik Simon; Gijs Vermeulen; Jan-Willem Gabriëls; Daniël Mensch; Geert-Jan Derksen; Gerritjan Eggenkamp; Matthijs Vellenga; Michiel Bartman	Chun Wei Cheung	Netherlands	5:43.75
3rd place, bronze medalist(s)	Stefan Szczurowski; Stuart Reside; Stuart Welch; James Stewart; Geoff Stewart; Bo Hanson; Mike McKay; Steve Stewart	Michael Toon	Australia	5:45.38
4	Sebastian Schulte; Stephan Koltzk; Jörg Dießner; Thorsten Engelmann; Jan-Martin Bröer; Enrico Schnabel; Ulf Siemes; Michael Ruhe	Peter Thiede	Germany	5:49.43
5	Scott Frandsen; Kevin Light; Ben Rutledge; Kyle Hamilton; Adam Kreek; Andrew Hoskins; Joe Stankevicius; Jeff Powell	Brian Price	Canada	5:51.66
6	Bastien Ripoll; Bastien Gallet; Jean-Baptiste Macquet; Julien Peudecoeur; Donatien Mortelette; Anthony Perrot; Jean-David Bernard; Laurent Cadot	Christophe Lattaignant	France	5:53.31
