= Rowing at the 2004 Summer Olympics =

Rowing at the Games of the XXVIII Olympiad
- Venue: Schinias Olympic Rowing and Canoeing Centre
- Dates: 14–22 August 2004
- Competitors: 557 from 55 nations

Rowing at the 2004 Summer Olympics took place at the Schinias Olympic Rowing and Canoeing Centre and featured 550 competitors taking part in 14 events.

The medals were split among 22 countries, Romania topping the medal table, their women winning 3 golds, with the traditionally strong Germany, Great Britain and Australia picking up four medals in total.

Romania's Elisabeta Lipă won her fourth consecutive Olympic gold medal and fifth overall. Lipă, who was part of Romania's women's eight, won her first in Los Angeles in 1984 followed by gold medals in 1992, 1996, 2000 and 2004, a record span of 20 years between her first and last gold medal. It was also her eighth overall, which is more than any other rower, having won a silver and a bronze in 1988 and an additional silver in 1992. In winning her medal at age 39, Lipă became the oldest rower to win a gold medal and the oldest athlete in an endurance sport to win a gold medal.

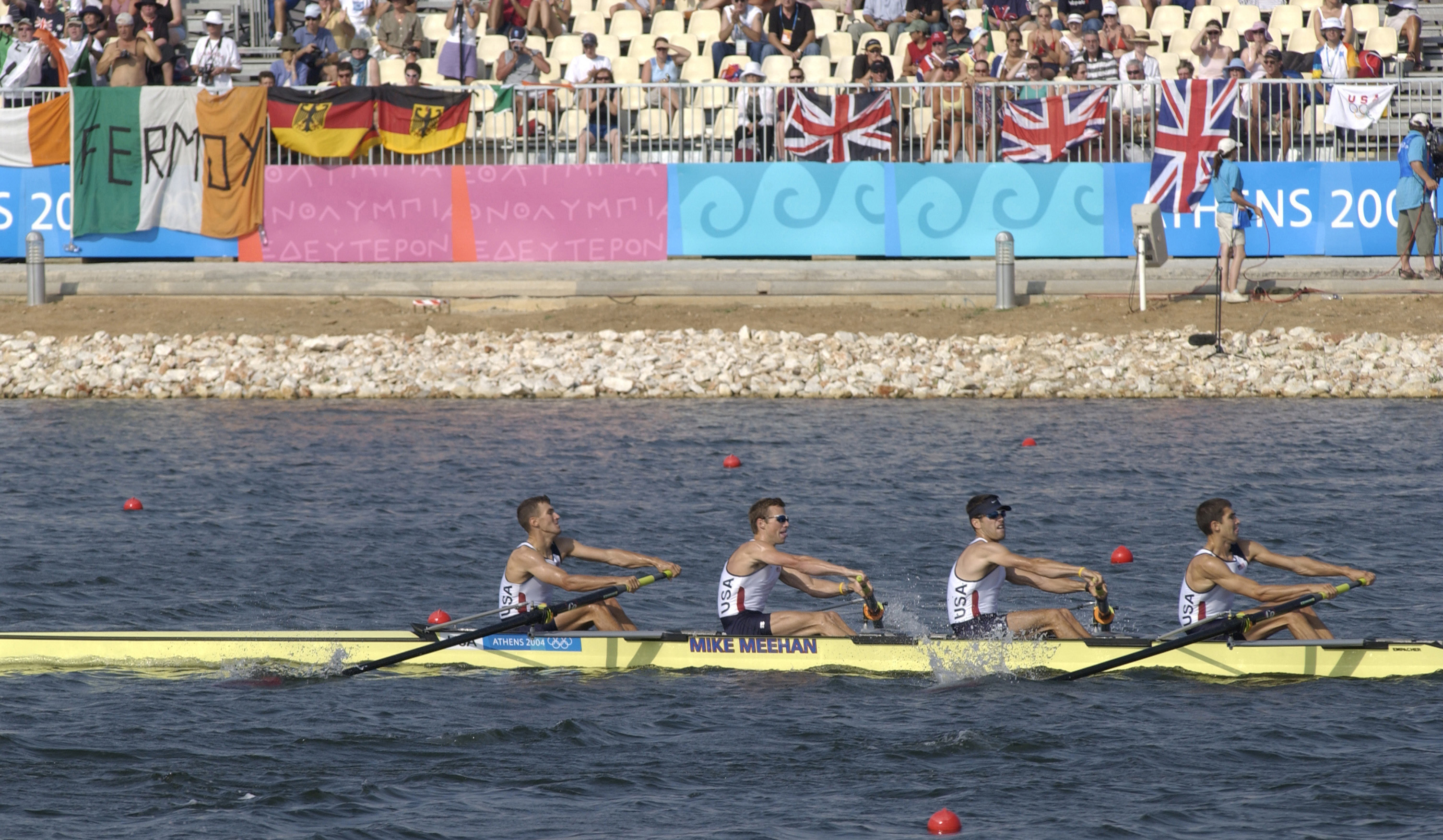
Team USA competes in the lightweight four rowing competition.

Matthew Pinsent also won his fourth consecutive medal, this time without legendary partner Steve Redgrave. The British men's coxless four of Steve Williams, James Cracknell, Ed Coode with Pinsent at stroke narrowly saw off the challenge of the World Champion Canadian crew of Cameron Baerg, Thomas Herschmiller, Jake Wetzel and Barney Williams. It was a dramatic stretch run with the lead literally changing hands with each stroke. (In rowing, the boat will surge depending on where the rowers are during the stroke. Pinsent would later say that he thought they had won because they were in the best part of the stroke when they crossed the line). Great Britain won with a time of 6:06.98, just 8/100ths of a second faster than the Canadians. Pinsent later wept at the medal ceremony.

Matching Lipă's and Pinsent's feat of four consecutive gold medals was German sculler Kathrin Boron in the women's quadruple sculls. She had won the doubles event in Barcelona 1992 and Sydney 2000 and the quadruple sculls in Atlanta 1996.

Australian James Tomkins, competing in his fifth games at the age of 39, won his third gold medal, and fourth medal overall, teaming with his longtime partner Drew Ginn in the men's pair. Tomkins and Ginn had been part of the straight four that won the gold medal at the 1996 Atlanta Olympics, and they had won the 1999 World Championship in the pair, but Ginn had missed the 2000 Sydney Olympics with a severe back injury, and Tomkins had finished third with a new partner Matthew Long in the pair. Tomkins was also the oldest male rower to win an Olympic gold medal, surpassing Steve Redgrave.

Norway's Olaf Tufte won the men's single scull, and Germany's Katrin Rutschow-Stomporowski won with women's single scull beating two-time defending Olympic Champion Ekaterina Karsten.

The Romanian women's pair of Georgeta Damian and Viorica Susanu took gold before doubling up to help their eight take gold, giving Damian her fourth Olympic Gold medal &mdash. Having won 2 golds in Sydney in the same disciplines.

The United States won the prestigious men's eight for the twelfth time overall and the first time since 1964. In the second preliminary heat, both the U.S. and Canadian crews broke the previous world best time, with the U.S. winning in 5:19.85, which stood as a world best time until the second World Cup regatta of 2012. The United States would go on to win the final.

== Medal summary ==
=== Men's events ===
Games	Gold	Silver	Bronze
Single sculls	Olaf Tufte; Norway	Jüri Jaanson; Estonia	Ivo Yanakiev; Bulgaria
Double sculls	Sébastien Vieilledent and Adrien Hardy; France	Iztok Čop and Luka Špik; Slovenia	Rossano Galtarossa and Alessio Sartori; Italy
Quadruple sculls	Russia; Nikolay Spinyov; Igor Kravtsov; Aleksey Svirin; Sergey Fedorovtsev	Czech Republic; David Kopřiva; Tomáš Karas; Jakub Hanák; David Jirka	Ukraine; Serhiy Hryn; Serhiy Biloushchenko; Oleh Lykov; Leonid Shaposhnikov
Coxless pair	Drew Ginn and James Tomkins; Australia	Siniša Skelin and Nikša Skelin; Croatia	Donovan Cech and Ramon di Clemente; South Africa
Coxless four	Great Britain; Steve Williams; James Cracknell; Ed Coode; Matthew Pinsent	Canada; Cameron Baerg; Thomas Herschmiller; Jake Wetzel; Barney Williams	Italy; Lorenzo Porzio; Dario Dentale; Luca Agamennoni; Raffaello Leonardo
Coxed eight	United States; Jason Read; Wyatt Allen; Chris Ahrens; Joseph Hansen; Matt Deakin; Dan Beery; Beau Hoopman; Bryan Volpenhein; Peter Cipollone (cox)	Netherlands; Matthijs Vellenga; Gijs Vermeulen; Jan-Willem Gabriëls; Daniël Mensch; Geert-Jan Derksen; Gerritjan Eggenkamp; Diederik Simon; Michiel Bartman; Chun Wei Cheung (cox)	Australia; Stefan Szczurowski; Stuart Reside; Stuart Welch; James Stewart; Geoff Stewart; Bo Hanson; Mike McKay; Stephen Stewart; Michael Toon (cox)
Lightweight double sculls	Tomasz Kucharski and Robert Sycz; Poland	Frédéric Dufour and Pascal Touron; France	Vasileios Polymeros and Nikolaos Skiathitis; Greece
Lightweight coxless four	Denmark; Thor Kristensen; Thomas Ebert; Stephan Mølvig; Eskild Ebbesen	Australia; Glen Loftus; Anthony Edwards; Ben Cureton; Simon Burgess	Italy; Lorenzo Bertini; Catello Amarante; Salvatore Amitrano; Bruno Mascarenhas

=== Women's events ===
Games	Gold	Silver	Bronze
Single sculls	Katrin Rutschow-Stomporowski; Germany	Ekaterina Karsten; Belarus	Rumyana Neykova; Bulgaria
Double sculls	Georgina Evers-Swindell and Caroline Evers-Swindell; New Zealand	Peggy Waleska and Britta Oppelt; Germany	Sarah Winckless and Elise Laverick; Great Britain
Quadruple sculls	Germany; Kathrin Boron; Meike Evers; Manuela Lutze; Kerstin El Qalqili	Great Britain; Alison Mowbray; Debbie Flood; Frances Houghton; Rebecca Romero	Australia; Dana Faletic; Rebecca Sattin; Amber Bradley; Kerry Hore
Coxless pair	Georgeta Damian and Viorica Susanu; Romania	Katherine Grainger and Cath Bishop; Great Britain	Yuliya Bichyk and Natallia Helakh; Belarus
Coxed eight	Romania; Rodica Florea; Viorica Susanu; Aurica Bărăscu; Ioana Papuc; Liliana Gafencu; Elisabeta Lipă; Georgeta Damian; Doina Ignat; Elena Georgescu (cox)	United States; Kate Johnson; Samantha Magee; Megan Dirkmaat; Alison Cox; Caryn Davies; Laurel Korholz; Anna Mickelson; Lianne Nelson; Mary Whipple (cox)	Netherlands; Froukje Wegman; Marlies Smulders; Nienke Hommes; Hurnet Dekkers; Annemarieke van Rumpt; Annemiek de Haan; Sarah Siegelaar; Helen Tanger; Ester Workel (cox)
Lightweight double sculls	Constanța Burcică and Angela Alupei; Romania	Daniela Reimer and Claudia Blasberg; Germany	Kirsten van der Kolk and Marit van Eupen; Netherlands

== Medal table ==
Rank	Nation	Gold	Silver	Bronze	Total
1	Romania	3	0	0	3
2	Germany	2	2	0	4
3	Great Britain	1	2	1	4
4	Australia	1	1	2	4
5	France	1	1	0	2
5	United States	1	1	0	2
7	Denmark	1	0	0	1
7	New Zealand	1	0	0	1
7	Norway	1	0	0	1
7	Poland	1	0	0	1
7	Russia	1	0	0	1
12	Netherlands	0	1	2	3
13	Belarus	0	1	1	2
14	Canada	0	1	0	1
14	Croatia	0	1	0	1
14	Czech Republic	0	1	0	1
14	Estonia	0	1	0	1
14	Slovenia	0	1	0	1
19	Italy	0	0	3	3
20	Bulgaria	0	0	2	2
21	Greece	0	0	1	1
21	South Africa	0	0	1	1
21	Ukraine	0	0	1	1
Totals (23 entries)		14	14	14	42

== See also ==
- Rowers at the 2004 Summer Olympics
