= 2008 European Rowing Championships =

- Location: Marathon, Greece
- Dates: 16–20 September 2008

The 2008 European Rowing Championships were held at the Schinias Olympic Rowing and Canoeing Centre, in Marathon, Greece, between 16 and 20 September 2008. They were the 2nd annual event after the decision made in May 2006 by the FISA to re-establish the European Rowing Championships.

Owing to a big storm announced on the Centre, all finales (A and B) took place on Saturday, 20 September and not Sunday, 21 September, as initially scheduled.

== Medal summary ==
=== Men's results ===
Event	Gold	Time	Silver	Time	Bronze	Time
M1x	Ioannis Christou (GRE)	6:52.96	Lukáš Babač (SVK)	6:55.95	Kostiantyn Zaitsev (UKR)	6:57.05
M2x	France; Julien Bahain; Julien Desprès	6:16.92	Estonia; Vladimir Latin; Kaspar Taimsoo	6:18.40	Ukraine; Artem Morozov; Vitaliy Kryvenko	6:20.09
M2-	Greece; Georgios Tsiompanidis; Pavlos Gavriilidis	6:29:42	Serbia; Goran Jagar; Nikola Stojić	6:31.21	France; Jean-David Bernard; Laurent Cadot	6:31.29
LM2x	Greece; Dimitrios Mouyios; Vasileios Polymeros	6:16.53	Italy; Lorenzo Bertini; Daniele Gilardoni	6:19.34	Hungary; Zsolt Hirling; Tamás Varga	6:22.41
M4x	Estonia; Allar Raja; Andrei Jämsä; Tõnu Endrekson; Jüri Jaanson	5:45.75	Germany; Markus Kuffner; Tim Bartels; Daniel Makowski; René Burmeister	5:47.75	Ukraine; Serhiy Hryn; Volodymyr Pavlovskiy; Oleh Lykov; Serhiy Biloushchenko	5:47.86
M4-	Greece; Nikolaos Goudoulas; Apostolos Goudoulas; Ioannis Tsilis; Georgios Tziallas	5:57.24	Italy; Domenico Montrone; Romano Battisti; Sergio Canciani; Andrea Tranquilli	6:00.04	Belarus; Andrei Dzemyanenka; Vadzim Lialin; Yauheni Nosau; Aliaksandr Kazubouski	6:02.36
LM4-	Italy; Salvatore Amitrano; Fabrizio Gabriele; Andrea Caianiello; Armando Dell'Aquila	5:58.92	Serbia; Veljko Urošević; Nenad Babović; Goran Nedeljković; Miloš Tomić	6:02.31	Czech Republic; Vlastimil Čabla; Vojtěch Bejblík; Jiří Kopač; Miroslav Vraštil Jr.	6:04.92
M8+	France; Victor Bordereau; Adrien Hardy; Pierre-Jean Peltier; Jean-Baptiste Macquet; Frédéric Doucet; Benjamin Rondeau; Sébastien Lente; Dorian Mortelette; Benjamin Manceau	5:32.01	Russia; Anton Zarutskiy; Aleksandr Lebedev; Roman Vorotnikov; Edgar Ivans; Aleksandr Kulesh; Dmitriy Rozinkevich; Vladimir Volodenkov; Denis Markelov; Pavel Safonkin	5:32.76	Poland; Sebastian Kosiorek; Michał Stawowski; Patryk Brzeziński; Piotr Buchalski; Wojciech Gutorski; Marcin Brzeziński; Rafał Hejmej; Mikołaj Burda; Daniel Trojanowski	5:33.11

=== Women's results ===
Event	Gold	Time	Silver	Time	Bronze	Time
W1x	Miroslava Knapková (CZE)	7:27.42	Annick De Decker (BEL)	7:34.04	Regina Naunheim (SUI)	7:35.04
W2x	Ukraine; Kateryna Tarasenko; Yana Dementyeva	6:55.95	Poland; Magdalena Fularczyk; Natalia Madaj	6:57.33	Italy; Gabriella Bascelli; Erika Bello	6:58.10
W2-	Romania; Georgeta Damian-Andrunache; Viorica Susanu	7:17.53	Russia; Vera Pochitaeva; Alevtina Podvyazkina	7:19.05	Belarus; Volha Shcharbachenia; Tatsiana Kukhta	7:21.35
LW2x	Greece; Chrysi Biskitzi; Alexandra Tsiavou	7:02.71	Poland; Weronika Deresz; Ilona Mokronowska	7:04.98	Hungary; Zsófia Novák; Zsuzsanna Hajdú	7:08.80
W4x	Ukraine; Svitlana Spiriukhova; Olena Olefirenko; Nataliya Lialchuk; Tetiana Kolesnikova	6:26.54	Russia; Olga Samulenkova; Larisa Merk; Oxana Dorodnova; Julia Kalinovskaya	6:28.20	Romania; Ionelia Neacşu; Cristina Ilie; Adelina Cojocariu; Roxana Cogianu	6:30.64
W8+	Romania; Constanța Burcică; Ana Maria Apachiţei; Rodica Şerban-Florea; Enikő Barabás; Camelia Lupaşcu; Ioana Papuc; Simona Muşat-Strimbeschi; Doina Ignat; Teodora Stoica	6:10.22	Great Britain; Jo Cook; Vicky Myers; Georgina Menheneott; Emily Taylor; Rachel Loveridge; Kirsty Myles; Lindsey Maguire; Hannah Elsy; Rebecca Dowbiggin	6:12.46	Belarus; Volha Maroz; Aliza Klimovich; Hanna Nakhayeva; Katsiaryna Yarmolich; Natallia Helakh; Volha Shcharbachenia; Tatsiana Kukhta; Yuliya Bichyk; Anastasiya Katsiashova	6:22.79

== Medal table ==
Rank	Nation	Gold	Silver	Bronze	Total
1	Greece (GRE)	5	0	0	5
2	Ukraine (UKR)	2	0	3	5
3	France (FRA)	2	0	1	3
3	Romania (ROU)	2	0	1	3
5	Italy (ITA)	1	2	1	4
6	Estonia (EST)	1	1	0	2
7	Czech Republic (CZE)	1	0	1	2
8	Russia (RUS)	0	3	0	3
9	Poland (POL)	0	2	1	3
10	Serbia (SRB)	0	2	0	2
11	Belgium (BEL)	0	1	0	1
11	Germany (GER)	0	1	0	1
11	Great Britain (GBR)	0	1	0	1
11	Slovakia (SVK)	0	1	0	1
15	Belarus (BLR)	0	0	3	3
16	Hungary (HUN)	0	0	2	2
17	Switzerland (SUI)	0	0	1	1
Totals (17 entries)		14	14	14	42
