= The Boat Race 2006 =

152nd Boat Race
- Date: 2 April 2006
- Winner: Oxford
- Margin of victory: 5 lengths
- Winning time: 18 minutes 26 seconds
- Overall record (Cambridge–Oxford): 78–72
- Umpire: Simon Harris (Cambridge)

Other races
- Reserve winner: Goldie
- Women's winner: Oxford

The 152nd Boat Race took place on 2 April 2006. Held annually, the Boat Race is a side-by-side rowing race between crews from the Universities of Oxford and Cambridge along the River Thames. Oxford, whose crew contained the first French rower in the history of the event, won the race by five lengths which was umpired by former Cambridge rower Simon Harris.

In the reserve race Goldie beat Isis and Oxford won the Women's Boat Race.

== Background ==
The Boat Race is a side-by-side rowing competition between the University of Oxford (sometimes referred to as the "Dark Blues") and the University of Cambridge (sometimes referred to as the "Light Blues"). First held in 1829, the race takes place on the 4.2-mile (6.8 km) Championship Course on the River Thames in southwest London. The rivalry is a major point of honour between the two universities and followed throughout the United Kingdom and broadcast worldwide. Oxford went into the race as reigning champions, having won the 2005 race by two lengths, while Cambridge led overall with 78 victories to Oxford's 72 (excluding the "dead heat" of 1877). The race was sponsored by Xchanging for the second consecutive year, and was umpired by former Oxford Blue Simon Harris.

The first Women's Boat Race took place in 1927, but did not become an annual fixture until the 1960s. Until 2014, the contest was conducted as part of the Henley Boat Races, but as of the 2015 race, it is held on the River Thames, on the same day as the men's main and reserve races. The reserve race, contested between Oxford's Isis boat and Cambridge's Goldie boat has been held since 1965. It usually takes place on the Tideway, prior to the main Boat Race.

== Crews ==
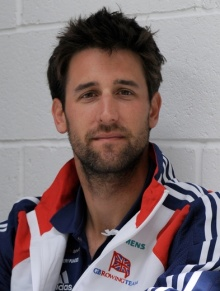
Tom James rowed at number 7 for Cambridge.

The Oxford crew, whose average age was 24, comprised four Britons, two Canadians, two Americans and, in Bastien Ripoll, the first French rower to participate in the contest. Cambridge's crew, with an average age of 26, consisted of three Britons, three Germans, an Australian, an American and a Canadian.

Seat	Oxford				Cambridge			
Seat	Name	College	Nationality	Age	Name	College	Nationality	Age
Bow	Robin Ejsmond-Frey	Oriel	British	20	Luke Walton	St Edmund's	American	26
2	Colin Smith	St Catherine's	British	22	Tom Edwards (P)	Gonville & C	Australian	28
3	Tom Parker	Harris Manchester	British	23	Sebastian Thormann	Peterhouse	German	30
4	Paul Daniels	St Anne's	American	24	Thorsten Engelmann	St Edmund's	German	24
5	Jamie Schroeder	Christ Church	American	24	Sebastian Schulte	Gonville & C	German	27
6	Barney Williams (P)	Jesus	Canadian	29	Kieran West	Pembroke	British	28
7	Jake Wetzel	Linacre	Canadian	29	Tom James	Trinity Hall	British	22
Stroke	Bastien Ripoll	St Catherine's	French	25	Kip McDaniel	St Edmund's	Canadian	24
Cox	Seb Pearce	Pembroke	British	23	Peter Rudge	Hughes Hall	British	24
Sources: (P) – Boat club president

== Race ==
The Championship Course along which the Boat Race is contested

Oxford won the toss and elected to start from the Surrey station where they were afforded some shelter from the inclement conditions with strong winds creating choppy water. Under cloudy skies, Oxford took an early lead but Cambridge came back into contention and held a half-a-length lead at Harrods. As they crews passed under Hammersmith Bridge, "wind and waves engulfed the boats and both seemed to check". Oxford drew level and their cox Seb Pearce called for a push; his crew responded, moving away from Cambridge in the rough water. Extending their lead out to two lengths by the Bandstand, Oxford pulled further away winning by five lengths in a time of 18 minutes and 26 seconds.

In the reserve race, Cambridge's Goldie beat Oxford's Isis. Earlier, Oxford won the 61st Women's Boat Race by half-a-length in a time of 5 minutes 54 seconds.

== Reaction ==
Cambridge coach Duncan Holland suggested "it's pretty hard to row with a boat full of water" while his cox Rudge claimed "Oxford were a little bit sheltered and it made a big difference". His counterpart, Oxford cox Pearce, was jubilant: "It was awesome. I didn't expect it work out that way but it was great. All along we were the better crew. The bookies just got it wrong." Cambridge Boat Club president Edwards said "They handled the conditions better than us and that was it ... There was no more we could have done." Oxford's president Barney Williams said "We were pushed really hard" while his French crew-mate Ripoll claimed "the key moment was along the island, in a washing machine".
