= Jan-Willem Gabriëls =

Dutch rower (born 1979)

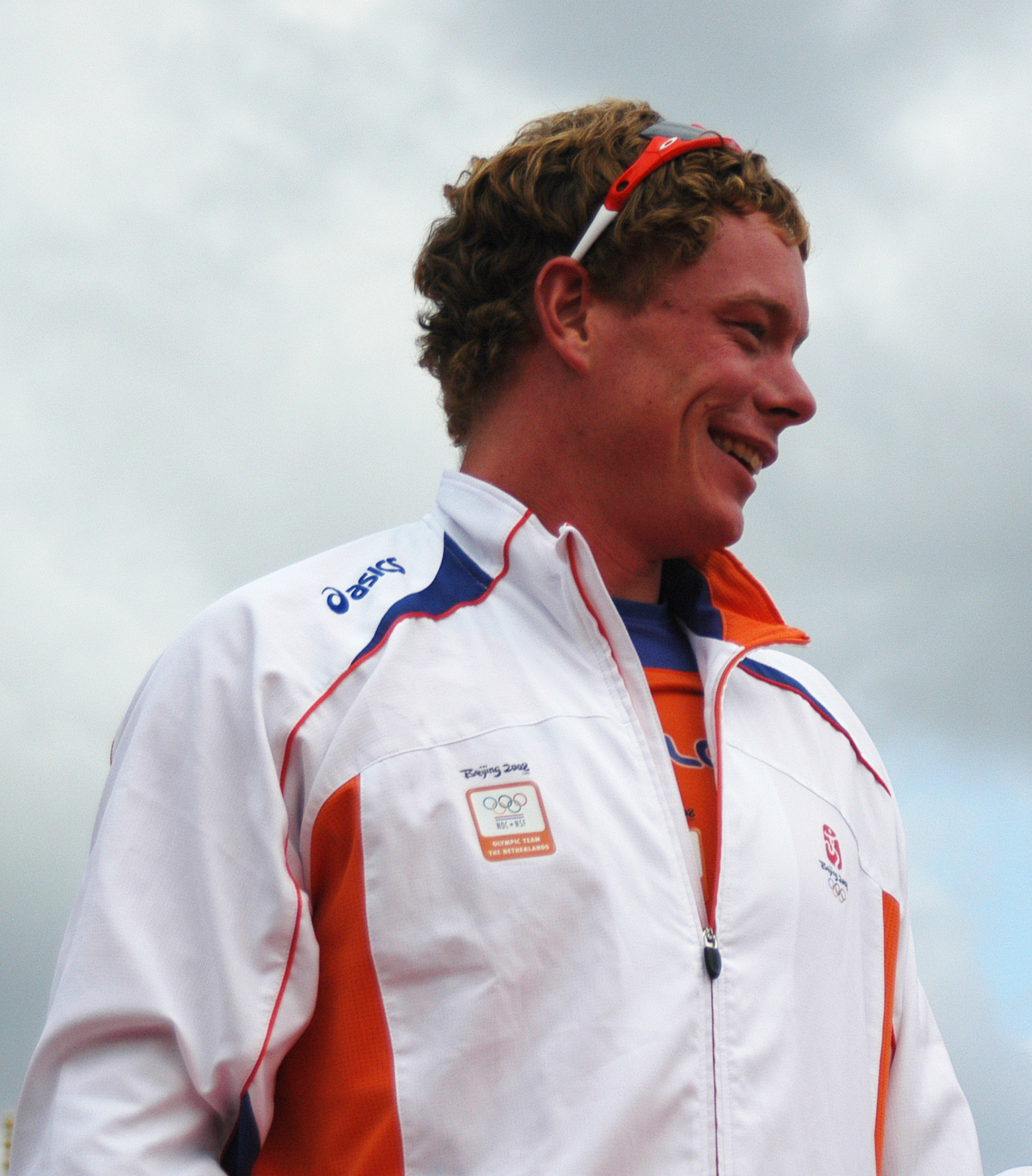
Gabriëls at the Dutch 2008 Summer Olympics celebrations

Jan-Willem Gabriëls (born 21 January 1979, in Amsterdam) is a rower from the Netherlands.

Gabriëls started rowing in 1997. He started rowing in the eights, but after the 2004 Summer Olympics he switched to the fours. His career highlight so far was in Athens in 2004 during these Summer Olympics where he won the silver medal in the eights together with Michiel Bartman, Geert-Jan Derksen, Gerritjan Eggenkamp, Daniël Mensch, Diederik Simon, Matthijs Vellenga, Gijs Vermeulen and Chun Wei Cheung.

After the Olympics Gabriëls, Vellenga, Vermeulen and Geert Cirkel started a new mission on the road to the 2008 Summer Olympics in Beijing with the fours. Their formation was successful straight away with a second place in the 2005 Luzern World Cup as well as the World Championships in Gifu that year. In 2006 they got another second place in Luzern and a third in Munich. In Eton where the World Championships were held they won another bronze medal. They were the team to beat in 2007 after winning the World Cup in Luzern and becoming second in both Amsterdam and Linz. However at the 2007 World Championships in Munich they had to be satisfied with another bronze medal. With a World Cup win in Poznań and a second place in Luzern in 2008, they qualified for the 2008 Summer Olympics.
