= Matthijs Vellenga =

Dutch rower

Personal information
- Nationality: Dutch
- Born: October 29, 1977 (age 48) Grijpskerk, Netherlands

Sport
- Sport: Rowing

Matthijs Vellenga (born 29 October 1977 in Grijpskerk) is a rower from the Netherlands.

His career highlight so far was in Athens at the 2004 Summer Olympics where he won the silver medal in the eights together with Michiel Bartman, Geert-Jan Derksen, Gerritjan Eggenkamp, Daniël Mensch, Diederik Simon, Jan-Willem Gabriëls, Gijs Vermeulen and Chun Wei Cheung.

After the Olympics Vellenga, Gabriëls, Vermeulen and Geert Cirkel started a new mission on the road to the 2008 Summer Olympics in Beijing with the fours. Their formation was successful straight away with a second place in the 2005 Luzern World Cup as well as the World Championships in Gifu that year. In 2006 they got another second place in Luzern and a third in Munich. In Eton where the World Championships were held they won another bronze medal. They were the team to beat in 2007 after winning the World Cup in Luzern and becoming second in both Amsterdam and Linz. However at the 2007 World Championships in Munich they had to be satisfied with another bronze medal. With a World Cup win in Poznań and a second place in Luzern in 2008, they qualified for the 2008 Summer Olympics. At the 2008 Olympics, the Dutch coxless four finished eighth.

At the 2012 Summer Olympics, Vellenga again took part in the men's eights, finishing in 5th place.
