= Gijs Vermeulen =

Dutch rower (born 1981)

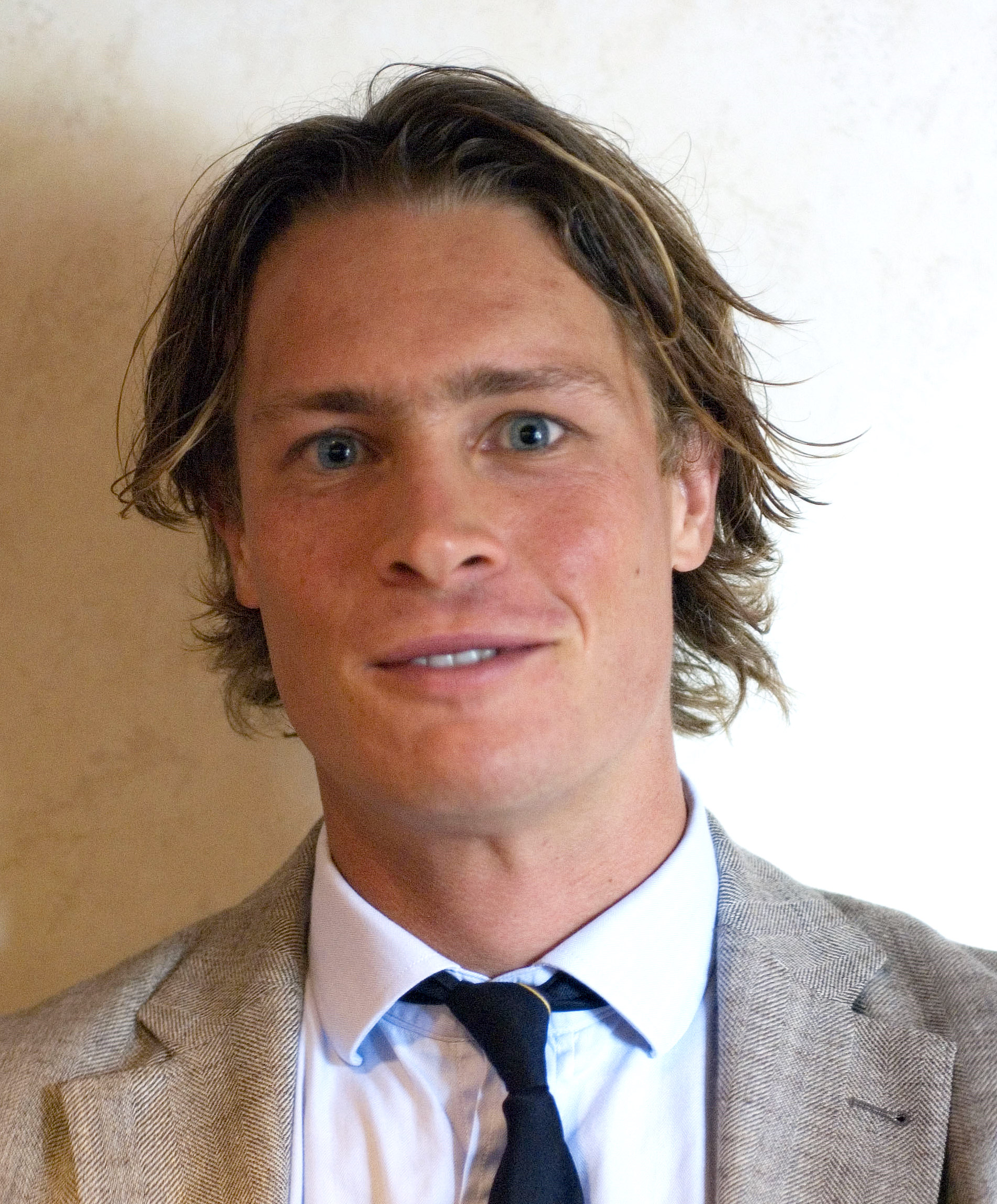
- Gijs Vermeulen

Personal information
- Born: 7 May 1981 (age 45) Amsterdam

Sport
- Sport: Rowing
Medal record
Men's rowing
Representing the Netherlands
Silver medal – second place	2004 Athens	M8+
World Rowing Championships
Silver medal – second place	2005 Gifu	M4-
Bronze medal – third place	2006 Eton	M4-
Bronze medal – third place	2007 Munich	M4-

Gijs Vermeulen (born 7 May 1981 in Amsterdam) is a rower from the Netherlands.

His career highlight so far was in Athens at the 2004 Summer Olympics where he won the silver medal in the eights together with Michiel Bartman, Geert-Jan Derksen, Gerritjan Eggenkamp, Daniël Mensch, Diederik Simon, Matthijs Vellenga, Jan-Willem Gabriëls and Chun Wei Cheung.

After the Olympics Vermeulen, Vellenga, Gabriëls and Geert Cirkel started a new mission on the road to the 2008 Summer Olympics in Beijing with the fours. Their formation was successful straight away with a second place in the 2005 Luzern World Cup as well as the World Championships in Gifu that year. In 2006 they got another second place in Luzern and a third in Munich. In Eton where the World Championships were held they won another bronze medal. They were the team to beat in 2007 after winning the World Cup in Luzern and becoming second in both Amsterdam and Linz. However at the 2007 World Championships in Munich they had to be satisfied with another bronze medal. With a World Cup win in Poznań and a second place in Luzern in 2008, they qualified for the 2008 Summer Olympics.
