= 2002 World Rowing Championships =

International rowing event

- Venue: Guadalquivir
- Location: Seville, Spain
- Dates: 15 to 22 September

The 2002 World Rowing Championships were World Rowing Championships that were held from 15 to 22 September 2002 on the Guadalquivir at Seville, Spain. Adaptive events were held for the first time at a World Championships.

== Medal summary ==
=== Men's events ===
Non-Olympic classes

Event	Gold	Time	Silver	Time	Bronze	Time
M1x	Germany; Marcel Hacker	6:36.33	Slovenia; Iztok Čop	6:39.00	Norway; Olaf Tufte	6:39.45
M2x	Hungary; Ákos Haller (b); Tibor Pető (s)	6:05.74	Italy; Agostino Abbagnale (b); Franco Berra (s)	6:06.93	Germany; André Willms (b); Andreas Hajek (s)	6:07.77
M4x	Germany; René Bertram (b); Stephan Volkert (2); Marco Geisler (3); Robert Sens (s)	5:39.57	Poland; Adam Bronikowski (b); Marek Kolbowicz (2); Sławomir Kruszkowski (3); Adam Korol (s)	5:40.43	Italy; Mattia Righetti (b); Marco Ragazzi (2); Rossano Galtarossa (3); Simone Raineri (s)	5:43.62
M2+	Germany; Lars Krisch (b); Andreas Werner (s); Claus Müller-Gatermann (c)	6:47.93	United States; Dan Beery (b); Dana Schmunk (s); Joe Manion (c)	6:50.60	Australia; Tom Laurich (b); Rob Jahrling (s); Michael Toon (c)	6:53.77
M2-	Great Britain; James Cracknell (b); Matthew Pinsent (s)	6:14.27	South Africa; Ramon di Clemente (b); Donovan Cech (s)	6:15.60	Croatia; Siniša Skelin (b); Nikša Skelin (s)	6:15.97
M4+	Great Britain; Tom Stallard (b); Steve Trapmore (2); Luka Grubor (3); Kieran West (s); Christian Cormack (c)	6:06.70	Germany; Arne Landgraf (b); Martin Zobelt (2); Jan-Martin Bröer (3); Klaus Rogge (s); Stefan Lier (c)	6:08.88	Croatia; Igor Boraska (b); Oliver Martinov (2); Ivan Jukić (3); Ninoslav Saraga (s); Luka Travaš (c)	6:10.54
M4-	Germany; Sebastian Thormann (b); Paul Dienstbach (2); Philipp Stüer (3); Bernd Heidicker (s)	5:41.35	Great Britain; Steve Williams (b); Josh West (2); Toby Garbett (3); Rick Dunn (s)	5:41.60	Italy; Niccolò Mornati (b); Raffaello Leonardo (2); Lorenzo Carboncini (3); Carlo Mornati (s)	5:44.12
M8+	Canada; Matt Swick (b); Kevin Light (2); Ben Rutledge (3); Kyle Hamilton (4); Joe Stankevicius (5); Andrew Hoskins (6); Adam Kreek (7); Jeff Powell (s); Brian Price (c)	5:26.92	Germany; Sebastian Schulte (b); Thorsten Engelmann (2); Jörg Dießner (3); Stephan Koltzk (4); Johannes Doberschütz (5); Enrico Schnabel (6); Ulf Siemes (7); Michael Ruhe (s); Peter Thiede (c)	5:28.16	United States; Ryan Torgerson (b); Garrett Klugh (2); Joseph Hansen (3); Wolfgang Moser (4); Michael Wherley (5); Eric Mueller (6); Bryan Volpenhein (7); Jonathan Watling (s); Peter Cipollone (c)	5:29.27
Men's lightweight events
LM1x	Ireland; Sam Lynch	6:49.86	Italy; Stefano Basalini	6:51.29	United States; Steve Tucker	6:52.94
LM2x	Italy; Elia Luini (b); Leonardo Pettinari (s)	6:10.80	Poland; Tomasz Kucharski (b); Robert Sycz (s)	6:13.50	Denmark; Mads Rasmussen (b); Rasmus Quist Hansen (s)	6:14.82
LM4x	Italy; Emanuele Federici (b); Daniele Gilardoni (2); Luca Moncada (3); Filippo Mannucci (s)	5:51.89	Spain; José Antonio Martín (b); Juan Luis Aguierre Barco (2); Carlos Loriente (3); Alberto Domínguez (s)	5:54.23	Netherlands; Wolter Blankert (b); Vincent de Loos (2); Dylan van der Linde (3); Marten Bosma (s)	5:54.59
LM2-	Chile; Christián Yantani (b); Miguel Cerda (s)	6:29.97	Italy; Carlo Gaddi (b); Franco Sancassani (s)	6:31.94	Great Britain; Ned Kittoe (b); Nick English (s)	6:34.40
LM4-	Denmark; Thor Kristensen (b); Thomas Ebert (2); Stephan Mølvig (3); Eskild Ebbesen (s)	5:47.21	Italy; Lorenzo Bertini (b); Catello Amarante (2); Salvatore Amitrano (3); Bruno Mascarenhas (s)	5:49.41	Canada; Douglas Vandor (b); Iain Brambell (2); Jonathan Mandick (3); Gavin Hassett (s)	5:50.55
LM8+	Italy; Luigi Scala (b); Alessandro Lodigiani (2); Giuseppe Del Gaudio (3); Nicola Moriconi (4); Marco Paniccia (5); Carlo Grande (6); Stefano Fraquelli (7); Bruno Pasqualini (s); Vincenzo Di Palma (c)	5:35.05	Germany; Martin Raeder (b); Lars Achtruth (2); Martin Fauck (3); Joachim Drews (4); Markus Pütz (5); Matthias Hobein (6); Sven Johannesmeier (7); Christian Dahlke (s); Jörg Dederding (c)	5:36.61	United States; Gavin Blackmore (b); Eric Feins (2); John Cashman (3); Andrew Liverman (4); Erik Miller (5); Jon Douglas (6); Tom Paradiso (7); Matthew Smith (s); Bill McManus (c)	5:38.21

=== Women's events ===
Non-Olympic classes

Event	Gold	Time	Silver	Time	Bronze	Time
W1x	Bulgaria; Rumyana Neykova	7:07.71	Belarus; Ekaterina Karsten-Khodotovitch	7:11.74	Germany; Katrin Rutschow-Stomporowski	7:17.07
W2x	New Zealand; Georgina Evers-Swindell (b); Caroline Evers-Swindell	6:38.78	Russia; Larisa Merk (b); Irina Fedotova (s)	6:41.06	Italy; Elisabetta Sancassani (b); Gabriella Bascelli (s)	6:41.65
W4x	Germany; Peggy Waleska (b); Marita Scholz (2); Manuela Lutze (3); Kerstin El Qalqili-Kowalski (s)	6:15.66	Denmark; Astrid Jespersen (b); Sarah Lauritzen (2); Dorthe Pedersen (3); Majbrit Nielsen (s)	6:16.84	Belarus; I. Jansen-Zakhareuskaya (b); Volha Berazniova (2); Ekaterina Karsten-Khodotovitch (3); Mariya Vorona (s)	6:18.12
W2-	Romania; Georgeta Damian (b); Viorica Susanu (s)	6:53.80	Canada; Jacqui Cook (b); Karen Clark (s)	6:57.08	Belarus; Yuliya Bichyk (b); Natallia Helakh (s)	6:59.21
W4-	Australia; Kristina Larsen (b); Jodi Winter (2); Rebecca Sattin (3); Victoria Roberts (s)	6:26.11	Canada; Roslin McLeod (b); Rachelle de Jong (2); Darcy Marquardt (3); Paulina Van Roessel (s)	6:28.32	China; Guifeng Zhao (b); Yang Cuiping (2); Cong Huanling (3); Feng Xueling (s)	6:31.28
W8+	United States; Kate Johnson (b); Dana Peirce (2); Caryn Davies (3); Maite Urtasun (4); Bernadette Marten (5); Alison Cox (6); Anna Mickelson (7); Kate Mackenzie (s); Mary Whipple (c)	6:04.25	Australia; Jodi Winter (b); Jo Lutz (2); Julia Wilson (3); Jane Robinson (4); Rachael Taylor (5); Rebecca Sattin (6); Victoria Roberts (7); Kristina Larsen (s); Carly Bilson (c)	6:05.10	Germany; Anja Pyritz (b); Maja Tucholke (2); Britta Holthaus (3); Dana Pyritz (4); Nicole Zimmermann (5); Susanne Schmidt (6); Lenka Wech (7); Silke Günther (s); Annina Ruppel (c)	6:05.19
Women's lightweight events
LW1x	Bulgaria; Viktoriya Dimitrova	7:28.89	United States; Lisa Schlenker	7:30.56	Spain; Teresa Mas De Xaxars	7:31.21
LW2x	Australia; Sally Causby (b); Amber Halliday (s)	6:52.84	Germany; Janet Radünzel (b); Claudia Blasberg (s)	6:53.56	Great Britain; Helen Casey (b); Tracy Langlands (s)	6:55.28
LW4x	Australia; Zita van de Walle (b); Marguerite Houston (2); Miranda Bennett (3); Hannah Every-Hall (s)	6:29.55	Netherlands; Mariel Pikkemaat (b); Mirjam ter Beek (2); Judith van Os (3); Maud Klinkers (s)	6:30.01	United States; Anne Finke (b); Abigail Cromwell (2); Michelle Borkhuis (3); Wendy Campanella (s)	6:32.48
LW2-	Great Britain; Naomi Ashcroft (b); Leonie Barron (s)	7:29.91	Chile; Paola Rodriguez Gallardo (b); Carolina Godoy Alarcon (s)	7:41.21	Spain; Maria Almuedo Castillo(b); Beatriz Casanueva (s)	7:47.26

=== Para ===
Pararowing (or adaptive rowing) was first included in rowing world championships in 2002.

Event:	Gold:	Time	Silver:	Time	Bronze:	Time
TAMix1x; TA singles	United States; Scott Brown	4:47.95	United States; Angela Madsen	5:03.62	Australia; Peter Taylor	6:17.44
LTAM4+ LTA men's coxed four	Australia; Ben Vines; Brett Horten; Bernard Pelten; Glenn Blackley; Susie Edwards (cox)	3:42.75	Spain; Ramon Martin; Marcos Vega Verona; Juan Pedro Fiz; Alfonso Galiano Martinez; Javier Maestre (cox)	3:55.05	United States; Aerial Gilbert; Jean Longchamps; Dwayne Adams; Tracy Lee; Lisa Boron (cox)	3:59.97

== Medal table ==
Place	Nation	1st place, gold medalist(s)	2nd place, silver medalist(s)	3rd place, bronze medalist(s)	Total
1	Germany	5	4	3	12
2	Italy	3	4	3	10
3	Great Britain	3	1	2	6
4	Australia	3	1	1	5
5	Bulgaria	2	0	0	2
6	United States	1	2	4	7
7	Canada	1	2	1	4
8	Denmark	1	1	1	3
9	Chile	1	1	0	2
10	Hungary	1	0	0	1
10	Ireland	1	0	0	1
10	New Zealand	1	0	0	1
10	Romania	1	0	0	1
14	Poland	0	2	0	2
15	Belarus	0	1	2	3
15	Spain	0	1	2	3
17	Netherlands	0	1	1	2
18	South Africa	0	1	0	1
18	Russia	0	1	0	1
18	Slovenia	0	1	0	1
20	Croatia	0	0	2	2
22	China	0	0	1	1
22	Norway	0	0	1	1
Total		24	24	24	72
