= Nereus Rowing Club =

Nereus Rowing Club (Dutch: De Amsterdamsche Studenten Roeivereeniging (ASR) Nereus)
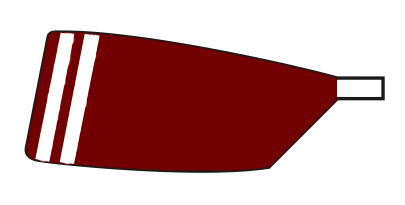
- Location: Amsterdam, Netherlands
- Home water: River Amstel
- Founded: 1885
- Website: Nereus website

Events
- The Varsity

Distinctions
- Thames Challenge Cup 1885, Temple Challenge Cup 2004, Temple Challenge Cup 2015, 2021, Ladies' Challenge Plate 1969 at Henley Royal Regatta, 43 wins in the Oude Vier at Varsity (rowing regatta)

The Amsterdam Student Rowing Club (ASR) Nereus, (Dutch De Amsterdamsche Studenten Roeivereeniging (ASR) Nereus) is a rowing club in Amsterdam, Netherlands which was founded in 1885 by J. Schölvinck as a subsidiary organization of the Amsterdamsch Studenten Corps, an organisation of Amsterdam student fraternities.

Within a short period of time, Nereus started proving itself by achieving big successes and winning its first event in 1888 followed by a winning streak of four Varsity victories 1891–1894. After obtaining national recognition, Nereus finally made its mark on the international rowing scene by winning at Hamburg in 1891 and by winning the Thames Challenge Cup at Henley Royal Regatta in 1895.

Nereus has provided rowers for the Netherlands' national Olympic crews, of which the golden men's eight in Atlanta (1996), the silver quad in Sydney (2000), the silver men's eight, bronze lightweight women's double and women's eight in Athens (2004) are examples. At the Beijing Olympics (2008), as well as the Rio de Janeiro Olympics (2016), Nereus lightweight women's double won the gold medal. One of the more notable members of Nereus is head coach Diederik Simon who has won two silver medals at the 2000 Sydney games and 2004 Athens games. Simon's most prestigious achievements come from his 1996 Gold in the men's eight at the 1996 Atlanta games, and his wins in the Oude Vier or Old four at the Varsity (rowing regatta). Another notable member is Tone Wieten, who is named the most successful Dutch Olympic rower ever after achieving Olympic bronze in Rio (2016), gold in Tokyo (2020), and gold again in Paris (2024), among others. Other notable members include Dirk Uittenbogaard, Veronique Meester, and Karolien Florijn.

There has always been a lot of focus on rowing. This is evidenced, among others, by the number of Varsity victories. Nereus has won the oldest student rowing event of The Netherlands, The Varsity, which is modelled after the Oxford and Cambridge Boat Race, a total of 45 times. Internationally, Nereus also always blew along strongly, given the victories at Henley in 1895, 1969, 2004, 2015 and 2021. Many victories were also won by rowers of Nereus at world championships and Olympics, among others.

Nereus' delegation to the 2008 Beijing Olympics was eleven people strong and at the 2014 World Championships, as many as sixteen rowers from Nereus competed. As many as thirteen rowers from Nereus competed at the 2024 Paris Games, bringing back four gold and five silver medals to Amsterdam.

The club's first boathouse was built in 1886 along the River Amstel. It was situated closer to the centre of Amsterdam than the present one. The old boathouse was demolished during the Second World War. The current boathouse was opened in 1953. A miniature version of the Nereus boathouse can be found in Madurodam.

Membership of Nereus was originally confined to members of The Amsterdam Student Corps, also the ‘Corps’. Changes in Dutch society in the 1970s and decreasing membership levels caused Nereus to welcome non-Corps members as well as merging with its female counterpart Thetis.

Nereus celebrated the opening of its 28th lustrum at the 139rd Dies Natalis on December 15, 2024.

== Honours ==
=== Olympics ===
| Year | Place | Nereus rowers with podium finish | Results |
|---|---|---|---|
| 1900 | Paris | Herman Brockmann (cox) | (gold) Coxed pair |
| 1900 | Paris | Herman Brockmann (cox) | (silver) Coxed four |
| 1900 | Paris | Herman Brockmann (cox) | (bronze) Eight |
| 1964 | Tokyo | Steven Blaisse, Ernst Veenemans | (gold) Coxless pair |
| 1968 | Mexico-City | Jan Wienese | (gold) Skiff |
| 1972 | Munich | Roel Luijenburg, Ruud Stokvis | (bronze) Coxless pair |
| 1984 | Los Angeles | Lynda Cornet, Harriet van Ettekhoven | (bronze) Eight |
| 1996 | Atlanta | Diederik Simon, Michiel Bartman | (gold) Eight |
| 2000 | Sydney | Martijntje Quik (cox) | (silver) Eight |
| 2000 | Sydney | Diederik Simon, Michiel Bartman | (silver) Quad scull |
| 2004 | Athens | Diederik Simon, Gerritjan Eggenkamp, Gijs Vermeulen, Michiel Bartman, Chun Wei Cheung (cox) | (silver) Eight |
| 2004 | Athens | Sarah Siegelaar | (bronze) Eight |
| 2004 | Athens | Marit van Eupen, Kirsten van der Kolk | (bronze) Double scull |
| 2008 | Peking | Marit van Eupen, Kirsten van der Kolk | (gold) Double scull |
| 2008 | Peking | Femke Dekker, Nienke Kingma, Sarah Siegelaar | (silver) Eight |
| 2016 | Rio de Janeiro | Ilse Paulis | 1st place, gold medalist(s) |
| 2016 | Rio de Janeiro | Robert Lücken, Boaz Meylink, Dirk Uittenbogaard, Tone Wieten | (bronze) Eight |
| 2020 | Tokyo | Dirk Uittenbogaard, Tone Wieten, Abe Wiersma | (gold) Quad scull |
| 2020 | Tokyo | Karolien Florijn, Veronique Meester | (silver) Coxless four |
| 2020 | Tokyo | Ilse Paulis | (bronze) Double scull |
| 2024 | Paris | Tone Wieten, Finn Florijn | (gold) Quad scull |
| 2024 | Paris | Veronique Meester | (gold) Pair scull |
| 2024 | Paris | Karolien Florijn | (gold) Skiff |
| 2024 | Paris | Bente Paulis | (silver) Quad scull |
| 2024 | Paris | Mick Makker, Gert-Jan van Doorn, Ruben Knab, Dieuwke Fetter (cox) | (silver) Eight |

=== Henley Royal Regatta ===
| Year | Races won |
|---|---|
| 1895 | Thames Challenge Cup |
| 1969 | Ladies' Challenge Plate, Stewards' Challenge Cup |
| 2000 | Queen Mother Challenge Cup |
| 2015 | Temple Challenge Cup |
| 2021 | Temple Challenge Cup |

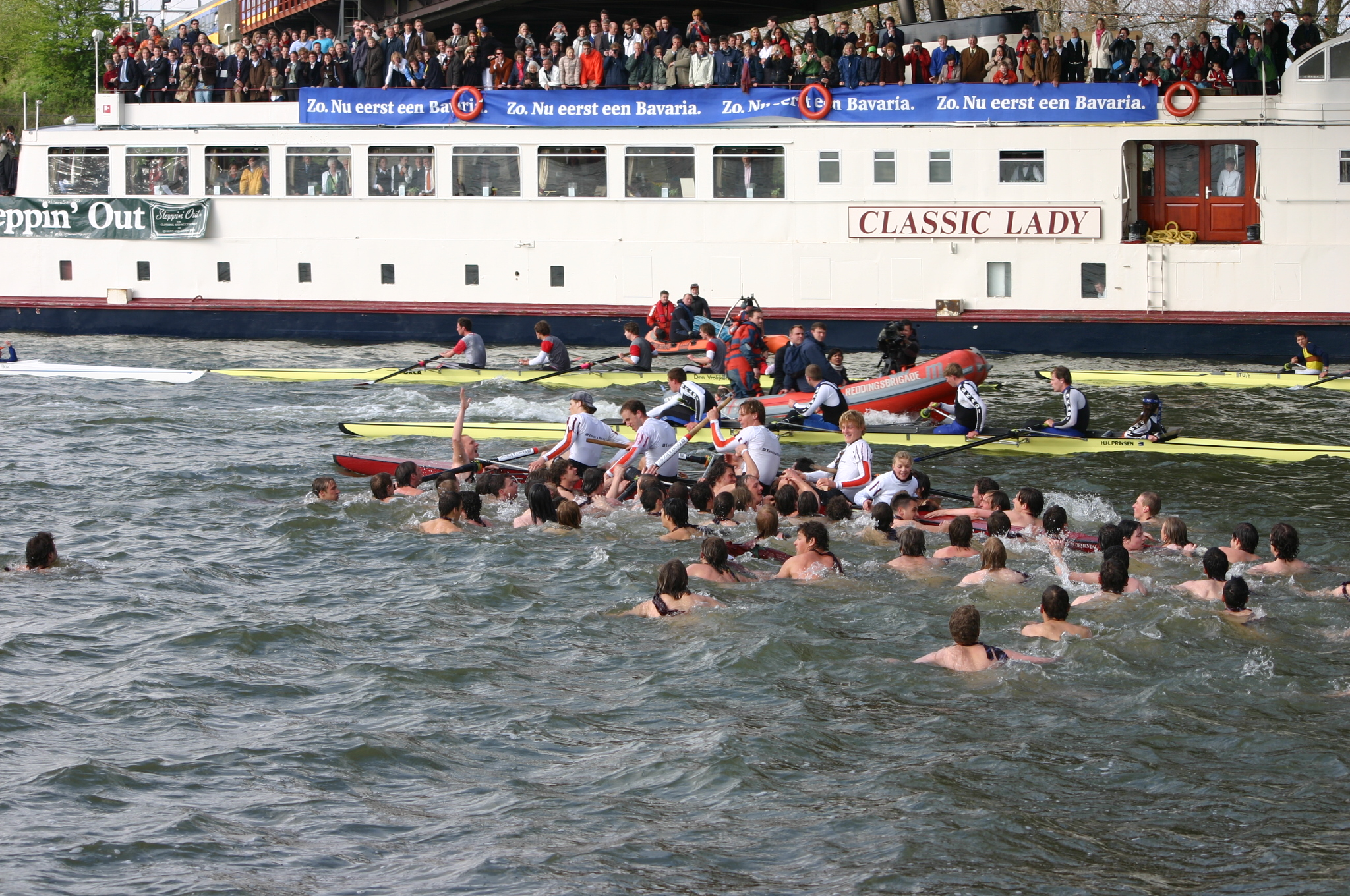
ASR Nereus wins the 122nd Varsity in Houten
