= The Boat Race 2002 =

148th Boat Race
- Date: 30 March 2002
- Winner: Oxford
- Margin of victory: 3/4 length
- Winning time: 16 minutes 54 seconds
- Overall record (Cambridge–Oxford): 77–70
- Umpire: Simon Harris (Cambridge)

Other races
- Reserve winner: Isis
- Women's winner: Oxford

The 148th Boat Race took place on 30 March 2002. Oxford won the race by three-quarters of a length, one of the narrowest margins of victory in the history of the contest.

In the reserve race Isis beat Goldie; Oxford also won the Women's race.

== Background ==
The Boat Race is an annual competition between the universities of Oxford and Cambridge. First held in 1829, the competition is a 4.2-mile (6.8 km) race along the River Thames in southwest London. The rivalry is a major point of honour between the two universities and followed throughout the United Kingdom and worldwide. Cambridge went into the race as reigning champions, having won the 2001 race by 2.5 lengths, and led overall with 77 victories to Oxford's 69 (excluding the "dead heat" of 1877). The race was sponsored by Aberdeen Asset Management for the third consecutive year.

The first Women's Boat Race took place in 1927, but did not become an annual fixture until the 1960s. Until 2014, the contest was conducted as part of the Henley Boat Races, but as of the 2015 race, it is held on the River Thames, on the same day as the men's main and reserve races. The reserve race, contested between Oxford's Isis boat and Cambridge's Goldie boat has been held since 1965. It usually takes place on the Tideway, prior to the main Boat Race.

== Crews ==
Luke McGee rowed at number 5 for Oxford.

Despite weighing just over 1 pound (0.45 kg) less per man than their opponents, Cambridge were the pre-race favourites. Both boats contained four Blues; the Oxford cox Peter Hackworth attended St Paul's School while Cambridge's cox Ellie Griggs attended St Paul's Girls' School, so both were familiar with the course. Oxford's crew contained two American international rowers in Dan Perkins and Luke McGee, and Gerritjan Eggenkamp, a Dutch international. Cambridge's stroke, Rick Dunn, cousin of Oxford's bow Andrew Dunn, was a world champion in coxless fours, and he rowed alongside fellow British internationals Tom Stallard and Josh West. Cambridge's other international rowers included American Sam Brooks, German Sebastian Mayer and Australian Stu Welch.

Seat	Cambridge		Oxford	
Seat	Name	College	Name	College
Bow	Tom Stallard (P)	Jesus	Andrew Dunn	Lincoln
2	Sam Brooks	St Edmund's	Bas Dixon	Pembroke
3	James Livingston	St Catharine's	Gerritjan Eggenkamp	Keble
4	Sebastian Mayer	Caius	Dan Perkins	Brasenose
5	Josh West	Caius	Luke McGee	Oriel
6	Lukas Hirst	St Edmund's	Ben Burch (P)	Pembroke
7	Stuart Welch	St Edmund's	Robin Bourne-Taylor	Christ Church
Stroke	Rick Dunn	St Edmund's	Matt Smith	St Catherine's
Cox	Ellie Griggs	Robinson	Peter Hackworth	Oriel

(P) – Boat Club President

== Race description ==
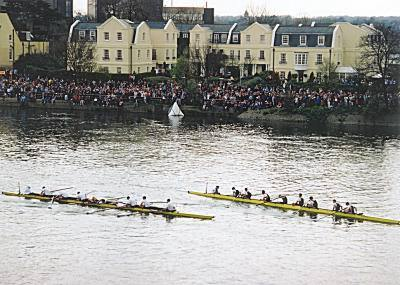
The Cambridge crew (left) and Oxford (right) after the end of the race

Cambridge won the coin toss and elected to start from the northern bank (the "Middlesex side") of the Thames. Despite Cambridge's cox Griggs having her hand raised (to indicate that she and the Cambridge crew were not yet ready to commence), race umpire Simon Harris started the race. With a stroke rate of 51, Oxford took an early lead, but Cambridge pulled level as the crews passed Craven Cottage. Taking a slight lead round the Surrey bend, Cambridge's number four, Mayer suffered an asthma attack and showed signs of struggle, allowing Oxford to draw up to within a second as they approached Barnes Bridge. In a sprint finish, Oxford pulled away to be three-quarters of a length clear at the finishing post.

Oxford finished with a time of 16 minutes, 54 seconds, Cambridge finishing two seconds behind them, three-quarters of a length behind. It was Oxford's second victory in the previous three years, and brought the overall result to 77–70 in Cambridge's favour. At the finish, following tradition, the Oxford crew threw their cox, Hackworth, into the water in celebration. Mayer was hospitalised minutes after the race, initially considered a result of exhaustion, but later diagnosed as following an asthma attack.

In the reserve race, Oxford's Isis beat Cambridge's Goldie. Earlier at Henley, Oxford won the 57th women's race by 2 1/2 lengths.

== Reaction ==
Hackworth said "it was neck and neck, but I had absolute belief we could do it". Four-time Olympic gold medallist Matthew Pinsent said of the race "it truly was amazing". Cambridge coach Robin Williams was generous in defeat: "Credit to Oxford. They did an awesome job and took their chance. It was a fantastic race", while Oxford's coach Sean Bowden said "I believed that if we could get through Barnes Bridge well we could still do it. They were rowing so well and I knew how much they wanted it." Simon Barnes of The Times noted that "Cambridge reeled in an early Oxford lead and went ahead themselves ... that should have been the end of it... But this Oxford crew just kept pestering away ... and, with the finish in sight, Cambridge ... yielded."
