= Kosiorek =

Kosiorek (Polish: [kɔˈɕɔ.rɛk]) is a Polish surname. Notable people with the surname include:

- Aleksandra Kosiorek (born 1985), Polish politician and jurist
- Sebastian Kosiorek (born 1983), Polish rower
