= Alexander Lebedev (disambiguation) =

Alexander Lebedev is a Russian oligarch, owner of various British newspapers.

Alexander Lebedev may also refer to:

- Aleksandr Lebedev (biochemist) (1869–1937), Russian biochemist
- Alexander Lebedev (figure skater) (born 2002), Russian-Belarusian figure skater
- Aleksandr Lebedev (footballer) (born 1981), Russian footballer
- Aleksandr Lebedev (rower) (born 1984), Russian rower
- Aleksandr Lebedev (speed skater) (born 1987), Russian Olympic speed skater
- Alyaksandr Lebedzew (born 1985), Belarusian footballer, plays for FC Dinamo Minsk
- Aleksandr Lebedev-Frontov (1960–2022), Russian painter, collagist, and musician
