= Laurich =

Laurich is a surname. Notable people with the surname include:

- Hildegard Laurich (1941–2009), German contralto
- Tom Laurich (born 1980), Australian rower
