= Bastien Ripoll =

French rower

Personal information
- Nationality: French
- Born: 8 July 1980 (age 44); Toulouse, France

Sport
- Sport: Rowing

Bastien Ripoll (born 8 July 1980) is a French rower. He competed in the men's eight event at the 2004 Summer Olympics. He also won the 152nd Oxford and Cambridge Boat Race, in 2006, as the strokeman of the Oxford Blue Boat. He remains the first French rower in history to have won the event.
