= Michael Ruhe =

German rower (born 1980)

Medal record

Men's rowing

Representing Germany

World Rowing Championships
Silver medal – second place	2002 Seville	M8+
Bronze medal – third place	2001 Lucerne	M8+

Michael Ruhe (born 3 April 1980 in Rinteln) is a German rower. He finished fourth in the eight at the 2004 Summer Olympics.
