= Aldo Tramontano =

Italian rower

Personal information
- Nationality: Italian
- Born: 7 April 1981 (age 43); Naples, Italy

Sport
- Sport: Rowing

Aldo Tramontano (born 7 April 1981) is an Italian rower. He competed in the men's eight event at the 2004 Summer Olympics.
