= Hannah Elsy =

British rower

Personal information
- Born: 28 December 1986 (age 39) London, England

Sport
- Country: United Kingdom
- Sport: Rowing
- Club: Durham University Boat Club
- Retired: 2008
Medal record
Rowing
Representing United Kingdom
European Championships
Silver medal – second place	2008 Marathon	Women's eight

Hannah Elsy (born 28 December 1986) is a former British rower.

Elsy was educated at Kingston Grammar School and Durham University.
