= Anthony Perrot =

French rower

Personal information
- Nationality: French
- Born: 3 October 1974 (age 51) Bergerac, France

Sport
- Sport: Rowing
Medal record
Men's rowing
Representing France
World Championships
Silver medal – second place	1998 Cologne	M4-

Anthony Perrot (born 3 October 1974) is a French rower. He competed in the men's eight event at the 2004 Summer Olympics.
