= Stefano Fraquelli =

Italian lightweight rower

Personal information
- Born: 18 July 1972 (age 53)
- Height: 188 cm (6 ft 2 in)
- Weight: 72 kg (159 lb)

Sport
- Sport: Rowing
Medal record
Men's rowing
Representing Italy
World Championships
Gold medal – first place	2002 Seville	Lwt eight
Bronze medal – third place	1995 Tampere	Lwt eight
Bronze medal – third place	1999 St. Catharines	Lwt eight

Stefano Fraquelli (born 18 July 1972) is an Italian lightweight rower. He won a gold medal at the 2002 World Rowing Championships in Seville with the lightweight men's eight.
