= Stephan Koltzk =

German rower (born 1978)

Medal record

Men's rowing

Representing Germany

World Rowing Championships
Bronze medal – third place	2001 Lucerne	M8+
Silver medal – second place	2002 Seville	M8+
Bronze medal – third place	2005 Gifu	M8+
Gold medal – first place	2006 Eton	M8+
Silver medal – second place	2007 Munich	M4+

Stephan Koltzk (born 15 January 1978 in Frankfurt (Oder)) is a German rower. He finished fourth in the eight at the 2004 Summer Olympics.
