= Geert Cirkel =

Dutch rower (born 1978)

Geert Cirkel (born 20 October 1978 in Dordrecht) is a rower from the Netherlands. He competed at two Olympic Games.

Cirkel started rowing in 1994. He mainly rows in the fours and occasionally participates in the quadruple sculls. In the quadruple sculls he won a silver medal at the 2001 World Championships in Luzern. In 2003 he quit rowing competitively, but after a two-year stop he returned to the sport in 2005, starting in the fours. In the Luzern World Cup he and his teammates finished in second position and they got the same result and a silver medal at the World Championships in Gifu. In 2006 he got a second place in Luzern and a third place in Munich during World Cups as well as a bronze medal at the World Championships in Eton.

After two silver medals at the Linz and Amsterdam World Cups in 2007 he added a gold in Luzern. At the World Championships that year in Munich he won another bronze medal. With a World Cup win in Poznań and a second place in Luzern in 2008, Cirkel, alongside Jan-Willem Gabriëls, Matthijs Vellenga and Gijs Vermeulen qualified for the 2008 Summer Olympics in the fours.
