= Arne Landgraf =

German rower (born 1977)

Medal record

Men's rowing

Representing Germany

World Rowing Championships
Silver medal – second place	2002 Seville	M4+
Bronze medal – third place	2003 Milan	M4+

Arne Landgraf (born 18 November 1977 in Neumünster) is a German former rower.
