= Klaus Rogge =

German rower (born 1979)

Medal record

Men's rowing

Representing Germany

World Rowing Championships
Silver medal – second place	2002 Seville	M4+
Bronze medal – third place	2003 Milan	M4+

Klaus Rogge (born 3 March 1979 in Buchen) is a German rower.
