= Phil Simmons (rower) =

British rower

Personal information
- Nationality: British
- Born: 6 February 1975 (age 51) London, UK

Sport
- Sport: Rowing

Phil Simmons (born 6 February 1975) is a British rower. He competed in the men's eight event at the 2004 Summer Olympics.
