= Bogdan Zalewski =

Polish rower

Personal information
- Nationality: Polish
- Born: 9 April 1981 (age 43); Płock, Poland

Sport
- Sport: Rowing

Bogdan Zalewski (born 9 April 1981) is a Polish rower. He competed in the men's eight event at the 2004 Summer Olympics.
