= Donatien Mortelette =

French rower

Personal information
- Nationality: French
- Born: 26 April 1982 (age 42); Armentières, France

Sport
- Sport: Rowing

Donatien Mortelette (born 26 April 1982) is a French rower. He competed in the men's eight event at the 2004 Summer Olympics.
