= Dariusz Nowak =

Polish rower

Personal information
- Nationality: Polish
- Born: 23 April 1978 (age 47); Włocławek, Poland

Sport
- Sport: Rowing

Dariusz Nowak (born 23 April 1978) is a Polish rower. He competed in the men's eight event at the 2004 Summer Olympics.
