= Jeff Powell (rower) =

Canadian rower

Personal information
- National team: Canada
- Born: 1976 (age 49–50) Winnipeg, Manitoba
- Education: University of Western Ontario

Sport
- Sport: rowing
- Position: stroke
- Club: Winnipeg Rowing Club
Medal record
Rowing
Representing Canada
World Rowing Championships
Gold medal – first place	2002 World Rowing Championships	M8+
Gold medal – first place	2003 World Rowing Championships	M8+

Jeffrey H C Powell (born May 13, 1976) is a Canadian rower. Born in Winnipeg, Manitoba, Powell began rowing in 1996 and is a graduate of the University of Western Ontario. He won the gold medal for Canada's men's eight team at both the 2002 World Rowing Championships in Seville, Spain and the 2003 World Rowing Championships in Milan, Italy. His crew came in fifth at the 2004 Summer Olympics in Athens, Greece in the men's eight.

From February 2025 until April 2026 he was the CEO of Rowing Canada.
