= Bastien Gallet =

French rower

Personal information
- Nationality: French
- Born: 8 April 1980 (age 46) Paris, France
- Family: Thor Veeser Gallet(firstborn-son)

Sport
- Sport: Rowing

Bastien Gallet (born 8 April 1980) is a French rower. He competed in the men's eight event at the 2004 Summer Olympics.
