= Aerial Gilbert =

Blind American rower

Personal information
- National team: U.S. National Adaptive Rowing Team
- Born: March 13, 1954 (age 72)
- Education: Mills College
- Height: 167 cm (5 ft 6 in)
- Spouse: Larry Lobel

Sport
- Sport: Rowing

Aerial Gilbert (born March 13, 1954) is a blind American rower who was a member of the United States adaptive team. She is also an avid beekeeper.

== Personal life and education ==
Gilbert was born on March 13, 1954. She enjoyed swimming as a child and began competing in the sport at age five. She later participated in basketball and tennis teams, as well.

Gilbert attended Mills College, where she competed on the school's rowing team.

In 1988, Gilbert used eye drops that had been criminally tampered with to include caustic alkali, resulting in her losing her vision. She subsequently learned to adapt to her new circumstances, furthering her education at a school for the visually impaired and acquiring skills such as Braille.

Later, Gilbert donated her kidney to a friend but had medical complications that resulted in her kidney starting to fail; as of 2016, she was looking for a kidney donor.

Gilbert was married prior to losing her sight, though the disability ultimately resulted in a divorce. In 1997, she married Larry Lobel, whom she met at Marin General Hospital.

In addition to rowing and working at Marin General Hospital, Gilbert is an avid beekeeper, having started her first hive when she was in high school.

== Career ==
=== Athletics ===
While in university, Gilbert competed rowing recreationally with Mills College and Humboldt State University.

After losing her sight in 1988, a friend encouraged her continue rowing in a double with a sighted person, noting that vision was unnecessary. Gilbert began rowing again and found confidence in the sport. In 1990, she entered her first competition as a blind athlete, competing against non-disabled rowers.

In 1999, 2000 and 2001 my rowing partner and I navigated the 33 nm Catalina Crossing from Marina Del Rey to Catalina Island (California) in open water.

In 1998, Gilbert teamed up with rower Perry Heffelfinger for the Catalina Crossing, a 32-mile ocean race. They competed in the race for the following two years, as well. The duo finished second behind the U.S. Women's National Rowing champions.

In 2002, the United States created their National Adaptive Rowing Team, which, unlike other sports for disabled athletes, competes with non-adaptive teams. The team, including Gilbert, competed in the 2002 World Rowing Championships in Seville, Spain, winning a bronze medal in the four; the team also won gold in the double.

In 2005, Gilbert competed at the World Masters Games, where she won gold in flat-water single rowing, as well as in doubles.

As of 2011, Gilbert was still training and competing with the national team, as well as training with the Marin Row Association on the Master Advanced Women's Team.

=== Medical ===
Gilbert worked at Marin General Hospital as a pediatric nurse. After losing her sight in 1988, she continued to work at the hospital, though she took roles developing X-rays, then became a medical transcriptionist.

=== Guide Dogs for the Blind ===
In 1994, Gilbert joined the Guide Dogs for the Blind organization as the director of volunteers, and ultimately increased the volunteer based from "125 volunteers in six positions to 500 volunteers who service the agency in 75 different jobs." In the early 2000s, she took a position in marketing and communications, increasing awareness of the program across the country.

== Legacy ==
Around 2011, Gilbert advocated to increase access to rowing for blind youth. Her advocacy resulted in indoor rowing being added to the Junior Blind Olympics. Additionally, she brought indoor rowing machines to blind athletic events for youth, where volunteers helped the children get set up on the machines and use them correctly. She also advocated for rowing machines to be added to schools for the blind.

== Honors ==
Gilbert was inducted into the National Jewish Sports Hall of Fame and Museum in 2004. She has also been inducted into the Jewish Sports Hall of Fame in Northern California.

In 2017, she received the Holman Prize, which honors blind individuals who showcase "adventurousness and can-do spirit".
