= Marco Paniccia =

Italian rower

Personal information
- Born: 17 May 1980 (age 46)

Sport
- Sport: Rowing
Medal record
Men's rowing
Representing Italy
World Championships
Gold medal – first place	2002 Seville	Lwt eight
Bronze medal – third place	1999 St. Catharines	Lwt eight

Marco Paniccia (born 17 May 1980) is an Italian lightweight rower. He won a gold medal at the 2002 World Rowing Championships in Seville with the lightweight men's eight.

Paniccia first won a world medal at the 1999 World Rowing Championships in St. Catharines, Canada, taking bronze with the Italian lightweight men's eight. After finishing fourth in the same event at the 2001 World Rowing Championships in Lucerne, the Italian eight won the final in Seville the following year in a time of 5:35.05.
