= Lucas McGee =

American rower and rowing coach

Lucas McGee Rowing

Lucas Whitney McGee is a former US Rowing national team member, former Oxford Blue Boat member, and former freshman coach of rowing at the University of Washington and Brown University. Luke began his rowing career at 15 years old while attending Loyola Academy after his father Ray and brother Josh encouraged him to try out for the team. After high school, he attended Yale University for a year, but then transferred to Brown University where he rowed competitively and was captain of his crew. Luke returned to Brown in the fall of 2004 and coached the Freshmen from 2004 to 2007. From 2004 to 2012, McGee's freshmen crews at Brown and Washington have captured three Eastern Sprints Championships, four Pac-10 Championships, three gold medals and one silver medal at the IRA National Championship, as well as winning Washington's first ever Temple Challenge Cup in 2010.

== Coaching ==
- Syracuse University Women's Rowing since 2018
- USRowing Men's national team since 2012
- University of Washington 2007–2012
- Brown University 2004–2007

== Education ==
- Oxford University 2001 – 2002 including The Boat Race 2002
- Brown University 1998 – 2001
- Yale University 1997 – 1998
- Loyola Academy 1993 – 1997

== Rowing Record ==
- 2006: Senior World's USA Spare, Eton, England
- 2003: Senior World's USA 4+, Milan, Italy (gold)
- 2002: Senior World's USA 4-, Seville, Spain (12th)
- 2002: The Boat Race, Oxford Blue Boat (1st)
- 2001: Senior World's USA 8+, Lucerne, Switzerland (4th)
- 2000: U23 USA 8+, Copenhagen, Denmark (bronze)
- 2000: Henley Royal Regatta Brown University Ladies Plate Champions
- 2000: Eastern Sprint Brown University Varsity 8+ (gold)
- 1999: U23 USA 8+, Hamburg, Germany (gold)
- 1999: Eastern Sprint Brown University Varsity 8+ (silver)
- 1997: Junior World Championships, USA 8+ (silver)
- 1997: Midwest Scholastic Championships (gold)
