= Julien Peudecoeur =

French rower

Personal information
- Nationality: French
- Born: 7 December 1981 (age 43); Pont-à-Mousson, France

Sport
- Sport: Rowing

Julien Peudecoeur (born 7 December 1981) is a French rower. He competed in the men's eight event at the 2004 Summer Olympics.
