= Jonathan Watling =

American rower

Medal record

Men's rowing

Representing United States

World Rowing Championships
Silver medal – second place	2003 Milan	M8+
Bronze medal – third place	2002 Seville	M8+

Jonathan Watling (born February 29, 1976, in Philadelphia, Pennsylvania) is an American rower. Following his rowing career, Watling worked as a medical doctor.
