= Andrew Hoskins =

Canadian rower (born 1975)

Personal information
- Born: December 20, 1975 (age 50) Edmonton, Alberta, Canada

Sport
- Sport: Rowing
Medal record
Men's rowing
Representing Canada
Pan American Games
Bronze medal – third place	1999 Winnipeg	Coxless four

Andrew N Hoskins (born December 20, 1975) is a Canadian rower. He is a graduate of the University of Alberta. He won the gold medal at both the 2003 and 2002 world championships for Canada's men's eight team in Milan, Italy and Seville, Spain respectively. Hoskins comes from a long line of rowers on his mother's side: He is the grandson of Ted Lindstrom; the nephew of Olympian David Lindstrom (Montreal 1976), and the cousin of Olympian George Keys (Seoul 1988).

Hoskins began rowing at the Edmonton Rowing Club as a form of physical therapy to recondition his shoulder shortly after recovering in 1996. Just two years later, in 1998, Hoskins won gold at Royal Canadian Henley in the Intermediate Single and Senior Single. Hoskins tried out for and made the Canadian rowing team later that year. For the 2000 Olympics in Sydney, he was a member of the Spares Club along with celebrated lightweights Ben Storey and Edward Winchester.

After a coaching purge in Canadian rowing, 2001 marked the arrival of Mike Spracklen as head coach of the men's program. Under Spracklen, Hoskins served as the captain of the men's program when the 8+ won a gold medal at both the 2002 and 2003 world championships in Spain and Italy respectively. Although favoured to win gold in Athens in 2004, the 8+ finished in a disappointing fifth place, well behind the USA boat, their arch-rivals leading up to the Games.
