= Sergio Canciani =

Italian rower

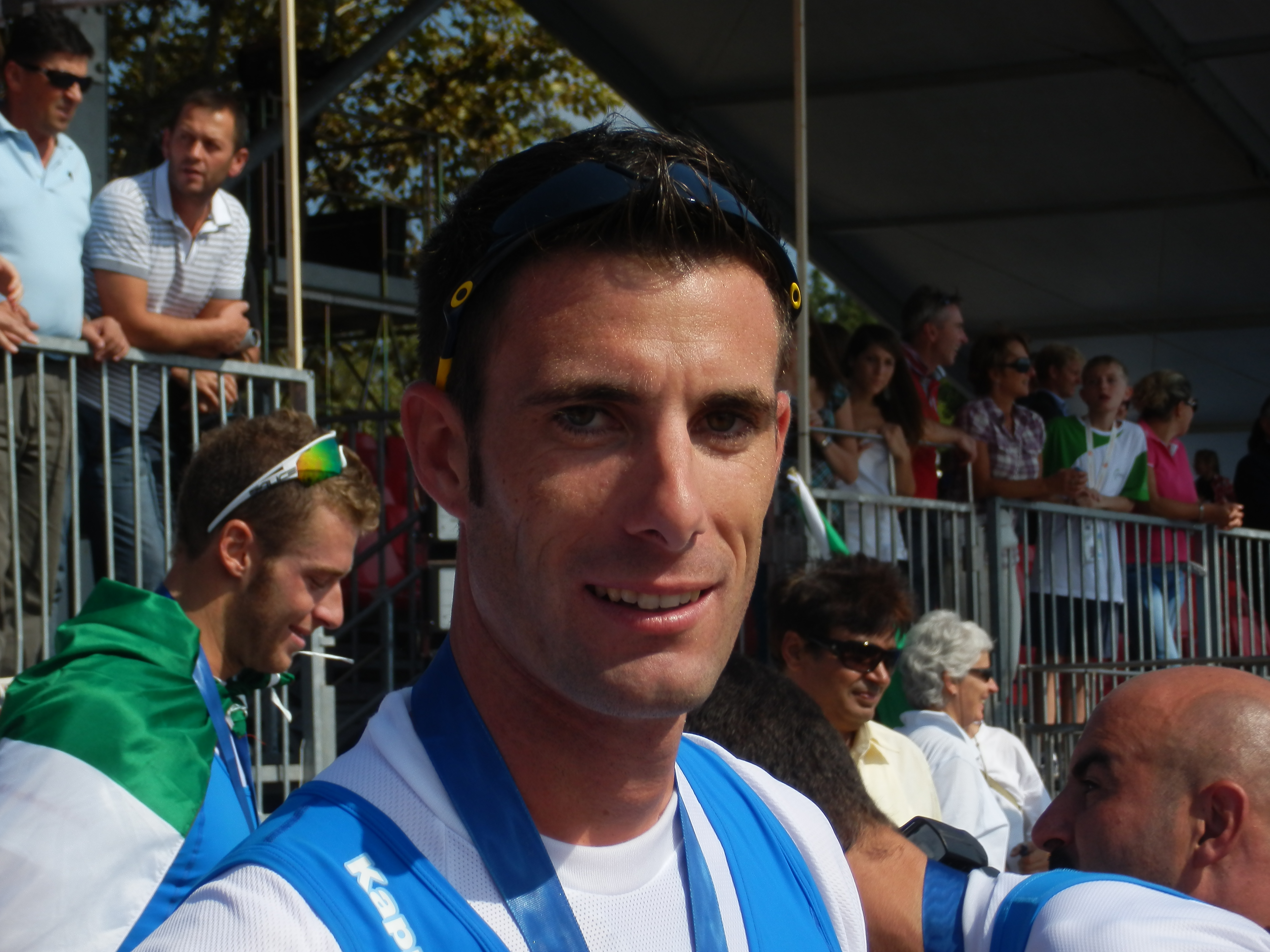
- Sergio Canciani in 2012

Personal information
- Nationality: Italian
- Born: 5 July 1982 (age 42); Latina, Italy

Sport
- Sport: Rowing

Sergio Canciani (born 5 July 1982) is an Italian former rower. He competed in the men's eight event at the 2004 Summer Olympics.
