= Jean-Baptiste Macquet =

French rower

Medal record

Men's rowing

Representing France

World Championships
Gold medal – first place	2006 Eton	Double sculls
Gold medal – first place	2010 Hamilton	Coxless four
Silver medal – second place	2007 Munich	Double sculls

European Championships
Gold medal – first place	2008 Marathon	Eight
Bronze medal – third place	2009 Brest	Eight

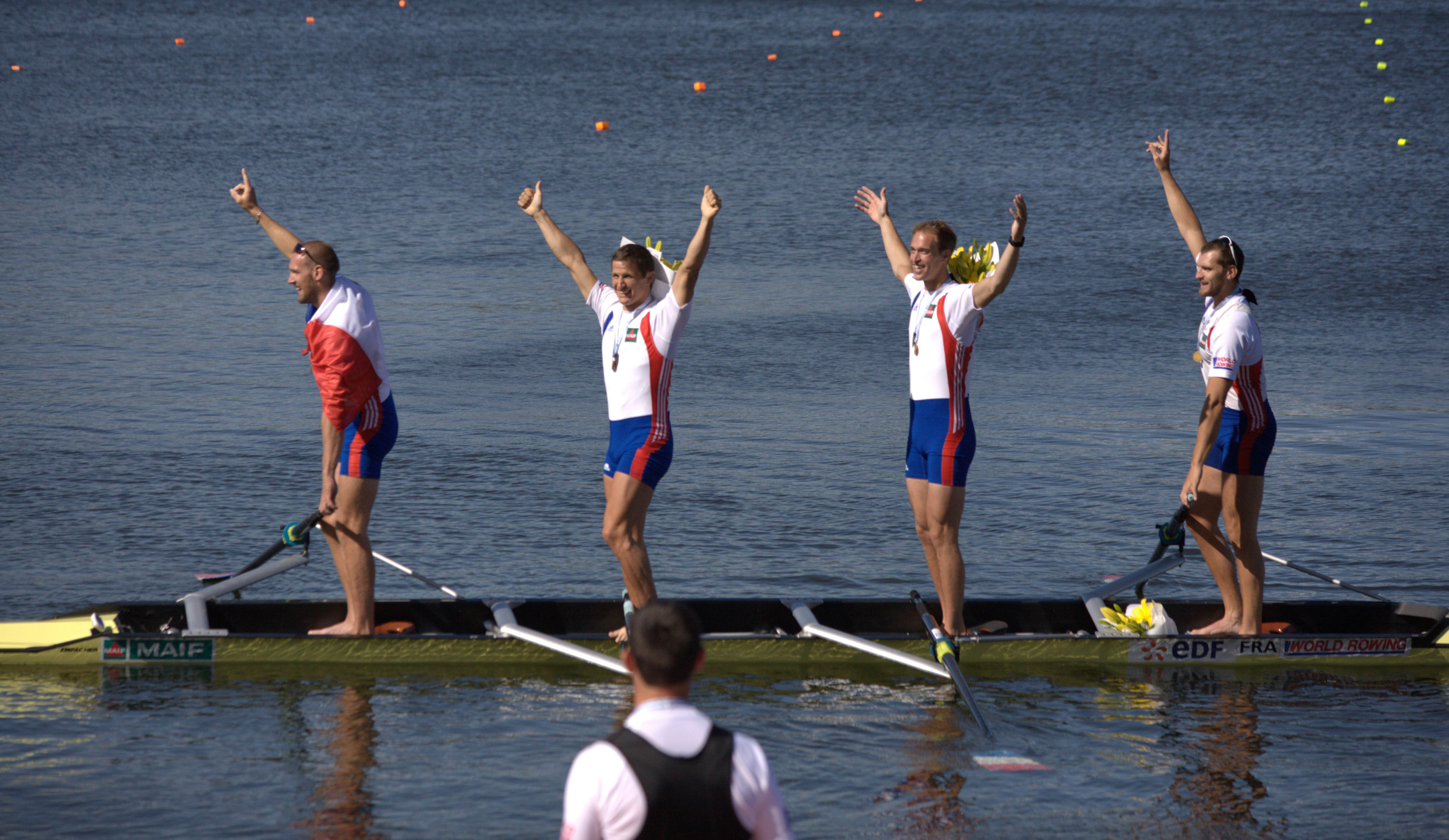
The French M4- team celebrating after their shock win at the 2010 World Rowing Championships in New Zealand

Jean-Baptiste Macquet (born 2 July 1983 in Dieppe, France) is a French rower. In 2010, he won the gold medal at the world rowing championship at Lake Karapiro in New Zealand, rowing in the coxless four, with Julien Desprès, Dorian Mortelette and Germain Chardin. He competed for France at the 2013 World Rowing Championships in the Men's Eight, finishing in 6th place.
