= Jan-Martin Bröer =

German rower

Medal record

Men's rowing

Representing Germany

World Rowing Championships
Gold medal – first place	2006 Eton	M4+
Silver medal – second place	2002 Seville	M4+
Bronze medal – third place	2003 Milan	M4+
Bronze medal – third place	2005 Gifu	M8+

Jan-Martin Bröer (born 19 May 1982 in Minden) is a German rower.
