= Ulf Siemes =

German rower (born 1978)

Medal record

Men's rowing

Representing Germany

World Rowing Championships
Gold medal – first place	2006 Eton	M8+
Silver medal – second place	2002 Seville	M8+
Silver medal – second place	2007 Munich	M8+
Bronze medal – third place	2001 Lucerne	M8+
Bronze medal – third place	2005 Gifu	M8+

Ulf Siemes (born 14 May 1978 in Oberhausen) is a German rower.
