= Pete Cipollone =

American rower (born 1971)

Personal information
- Full name: Peter M. Cipollone
- Born: February 5, 1971 (age 55) Marietta, Ohio, U.S.
- Height: 5 ft 2 in (157 cm)
- Weight: 121 lb (55 kg)
Medal record
Men's rowing
Representing the United States
Olympic Games
Gold medal – first place	2004 Athens	Eight
World Championships
Gold medal – first place	1999 St Catharine's	Eight
Gold medal – first place	1998 Cologne	Eight
Gold medal – first place	1997 Aiguebelette	Eight
Gold medal – first place	1995 Tampere	Coxed four
Silver medal – second place	2003 Milan	Eight
Silver medal – second place	1994 Indianapolis	Coxed four
Bronze medal – third place	2002 Seville	Eight
Pan American Games
Gold medal – first place	1995 Mar del Plata	Lwt eight
Summer Universiade
Gold medal – first place	1993 Buffalo	Eight

Peter M. "Pete" Cipollone (born February 5, 1971) is an American rowing coxswain of the 2004 Olympic gold medal-winning U.S. men's eight rowing team. He is a native of Ardmore, Pennsylvania, and attended Saint Joseph's Preparatory School in Philadelphia and the University of California, Berkeley. Cipollone won World Championships in the heavyweight men's eight in 1997, 1998, and 1999.
