= Christian Cormack =

British rowing cox

Personal information
- Full name: Christian Alexander Cormack
- Nationality: United Kingdom
- Born: 1 September 1976 (age 49) Hammersmith, London, UK
- Height: 1.68 m (5 ft 6 in)
- Weight: 60 kg (132 lb)

Sport
- College team: University of London
- Club: Leander Club
Medal record
Men's rowing
Representing Great Britain
World Rowing Championships
Gold medal – first place	2002 Seville	M4+
Silver medal – second place	1999 St Catharine's	ML8+
Silver medal – second place	2000 Zagreb	ML8+
Bronze medal – third place	2003 Milan	M8+

Christian Cormack (born 1 September 1976 in Hammersmith, London) is a British rowing cox. He competed for the British National Team between 1996 and 2004, winning four medals at the World Rowing Championships including a gold in 2002, two silvers and a bronze medal. In the World Rowing Cup series he won gold in 2001 Munich, silver in 1997 Munich, 1998 Hazewinkel and bronze at 1998 Lucerne and 1999 Lucerne. He retired from rowing after competing at 2004 Athens Olympics.

Cormack also coxed the winning Cambridge eight in the Boat Race in 2001. His crews won the Prince Philip Challenge Cup at Henley Royal Regatta in 2003, and won the Head of the River Race five times – in 1999 and 2000 for Queen's Tower, and 2002, 2003 and 2005 for Leander Club.

== See also ==
- List of Cambridge University Boat Race crews
