= Josh West (rower) =

British-American Olympic rower and Earth Sciences professor

Personal information
- Full name: A. Joshua West
- Born: March 25, 1977 (age 49) Santa Fe, New Mexico, U.S.
- Education: Yale University; Gonville and Caius College, Cambridge
- Occupation(s): geologist, college professor
- Employer: University of Southern California

Sport
- Sport: Men's Eight, Men's Four
- College team: Crew, Yale University
- Club: Caius Boat Club
Medal record
Representing Great Britain
Men's rowing
Olympic Games
Silver medal – second place	2008 Beijing	Men's Eight
World Rowing Championship
Silver medal – second place	2002 Seville	Men's Four
Silver medal – second place	2003 Milan	Men's Four
Bronze medal – third place	2007 Munich	Men's Eight

A. Joshua West (born 25 March 1977) is a dual citizen British-American Olympic rower and Earth Sciences professor. He is a two-time World Championship silver medalist, a World Championship bronze medalist, and a four-time Cambridge Blue, and represented Great Britain in the eight at the 2004 Olympic Games, won a bronze medal in the eight in the 2007 World Cup series, and won a bronze medal at the 2007 World Championships in the eight, and won a silver medal in the eight in the 2008 Olympic Games.

== Early life ==
West is Jewish and was born in Santa Fe, New Mexico, United States. His mother is American and his father is British.

West attended Yale University for his undergraduate degree, majoring in geology and international studies. As an undergraduate he was a member of the St. Anthony Hall literary society and was a member of the crew team. In 1999, West attended Gonville and Caius College, Cambridge for postgraduate study as a Marshall Scholar. He completed a doctorate at Cambridge in 2005.

== Rowing career ==
At Yale, West learned to row under Freshman Coach Justin Moore and Varsity Coach Dave Vogel. He participated in the 4-mile (6.4 km) Varsity Eights version of the Harvard-Yale Boat Race his senior year (1998) but lost to Harvard.

While studying in England, he earned a spot in the Blue Boat for The Boat Race against Oxford University. Earning a seat in Cambridge's Blue Boat every year until 2002, West and the "Light Blues" defeated the "Dark Blues" twice in those four years (1999 & 2001). In 2000, West lined up against former Yale teammates Alexander Reid and Eirik Lilledahl, who were the stern pair of the victorious Oxford crew. At 6 ft 9.5 in (2.07 m), West is the tallest recorded oarsman to participate in The Boat Race. He also twice won May Bumps headships with Caius Boat Club.

Building on his Cambridge successes, West eventually became a member of the British National Rowing Team and won two silver medals (2002 & 2003) with the British Four and one bronze medal (2007) with the British Eight at the World Rowing Championships.

West's most recent success came in the Eight rowing for Great Britain at the 2008 Olympics in Beijing, China, where the British crew picked up a silver medal in a close finish behind the Canadians.

== Academic career ==
West is currently an Associate Professor of Earth Sciences and Zinsmeyer Early Career Chair in Marine Studies in the Department of Earth Sciences at the University of Southern California. His academic focus is on the chemical processes at the Earth's surface, and how they maintain a habitable planet that supports life.

== See also ==
- List of Jewish rowers
