= Tom Laurich =

Australian rower (born 1980)

Personal information
- Born: 24 July 1980 (age 45)
- Years active: 1994–2008

Sport
- Sport: Rowing
- Club: Mosman Rowing Club
Medal record
Men's rowing
Representing Australia
World Rowing Championships
Silver medal – second place	2002 Seville	M2+
Junior World Rowing Championships
Gold medal – first place	1998 Linz	M1X

Tom Laurich (born 24 July 1980) is an Australian former rower – a junior world champion, a national champion, an Olympian and a medallist at World Championships. He has coached crews at the elite world class level.

== Club and state rowing career ==
Laurich's junior rowing started at the Nepean Rowing Club in western Sydney. His senior club rowing was from the Sydney Rowing Club and later the Mosman Rowing Club.

Laurich's first New South Wales selection came in the 1996 U22 Trans-Tasman series contested between New South Wales and New Zealand where he competed in a single scull. In the 1997 U22 Trans-Tasman series he rowed in a double scull with Peter Hardcastle.

In 2002 Laurich was first selected to the New South Wales men's senior eight who contested the King's Cup at the Interstate Regatta within the Australian Rowing Championships From 2002 to 2004 and from 2006 to 2008 he rowed in New South Wales men's senior eights competing for the King's Cup at the Interstate Regatta. He saw King's Cup victories in 2004 and 2008.

In Nepean Rowing Club colours he won the U19 Australian national single sculls title at the Australian Rowing Championships in 1998. In 2001 he won the national double scull championship title in Mosman Rowing Club colours with Peter Hardcastle.

== International representative rowing ==
Laurich's first Australian representative selection came in 1998 as a sculler. He rowed to a bronze medal in the single scull at the World Junior Rowing Championships in Linz, Austria. He rowed in Australian sculling boats at the next three years' World Rowing U23 Championships – at Hamburg in 1999 in a quad scull, in Copenhagen 2000 in a single scull and in Linz 2001 again in the quad scull. In 2001 he also competed in the quad at the World Rowing Cup IV.

Laurich then shifted to sweep rowing. At the 2002 World Rowing Championships in Seville he rowed in a coxed four and with Robert Jahrling and Michael Toon he was in the coxed pair which won the Australian men's team their only medal – a bronze – in Seville.

Laurich represented Australia at the Athens 2004 Summer Olympics in the men's coxless four. With Jahrling, David Dennis, and David McGowan, he recorded a time of 6.13.06 in the final, rowing to a fourth-place finish.

From 2006 Laurich secured a seat in the Australian men's eight. He raced at two World Rowing Cups in Europe each year in 2006 and 2007 and both years at the World Championships. The eight placed fourth at Eton Dorney 2006 and at Munich 2007 they failed to make the A final and finished in overall eighth place. Coming into the 2008 Olympic year, Laurich held his place in the four set of the eight. At the 2008 Beijing Olympics that crew finished last in their heat, fought through a repechage to make the Olympic final and finished in sixth place. It was Laurich's final representative appearance.

== Post competitive rowing ==
Since 2011 he has been an elite development rowing coach at Mosman and for Australian representative squads. He coached the Australian men's coxless four to medal winning performances at successive world championships - silver in 2013 and bronze in 2014.

Following his time at Mosman Tom worked at the VIS before making the move to Sydney University Boat Club in 2019 also as an elite development coach. His success was affirmed through his appointment as head coach in 2025.

== Palmares as competitor ==
- 1998 World Rowing Junior Championships: JM1x Bronze
- 1999 Nations Cup BM4x 6th
- 2000 Nations Cup M1x 4th
- 2000 Lucerne Olympic qualifiers
- 2001 World Rowing Cup M4x Munich 6th
- 2001 World Rowing Championships M4x Lucerne reserve
- 2001 World Rowing U23 Championships BM4x Linz Bronze
- 2002 World Rowing Championships M2+ Seville Bronze
- 2002 World Rowing Championships M4+ Seville 7th
- 2004 World Rowing Cup M4- Lucerne 4th
- 2004 Olympic Games M4- Athens 4th
