= Michael Toon =

Australian rowing coxswain (born 1979)

Personal information
- Nickname: Toony
- Nationality: Australian
- Born: 11 April 1979 (age 47) Brisbane

Sport
- Club: Toowong Rowing Club
Medal record
Men's rowing
Representing Australia
Olympic Games
Bronze medal – third place	2004 Athens	M8+
World Rowing Championships
Bronze medal – third place	2002 Seville	M2+
World Rowing U23 Championships
Gold medal – first place	1998 Ioannina	M8+
Silver medal – second place	2000 Copenhagen	M8+

Michael Toon (born 11 April 1979) is an Australian rowing coxswain. He is a former Australian national champion, an U23 world champion, an Olympian and a medallist at world championships and the 2004 Olympics.

== Early life ==
Toon was born with a rare condition known as "transposition of the great vessels". At the age of three, he required open-heart surgery and had a cardiac pacemaker implanted when he was just seven. He was unable to play contact sports at school and his father encouraged him to take up coxing.

== Club and state rowing ==
Born in Brisbane, Queensland, Toon's senior club rowing was from the Toowong Rowing Club.

After winning the Trans-Tasman series in 1996 as cox of the Queensland Junior eight Toon's first state representation at the National championships came in 1997 when he was selected to cox the Queensland youth eight to contest the Noel F Wilkinson Trophy at the Interstate Regatta within the Australian Rowing Championships. On a Queensland-record-equalling twelve consecutive occasions from 1998 to 2009 Toon was selected to cox the Queensland men's senior eight contesting the King's Cup at the Interstate Regatta.

In Toowong Rowing Club colours he steered numerous crews in national championship title attempts at the Australian Rowing Championships. He coxed composite Queensland lightweight eights contesting the Australian lightweight eight championship in 2005, 2006, 2007 and 2008. In 2007 he was in the stern of the composite Queensland four which won the Australian coxed four national title.

== International representative rowing ==
Toon made his Australian representative debut aged seventeen, steering a coxed four at the 1996 World Rowing U23 Championships in Hazewinkel to fifth place. In 1997 he was in the stern of the Australian U23 men's eight, coached by Noel Donaldson. They raced at World Rowing Cup in Lucerne to tenth place and then competed at the 1997 World Rowing Championships in Milan, where they placed fourth. In 1998 he was still in the U23 eight. They contested the World Rowing Cup III in Lucerne, placing 4th in the A Final, before racing at the 1998 World Rowing U23 Championships in Ioannina for a gold medal, the only Australian crew to have won this event. In 2000 Toon made his fourth appearance at the U23 World Championships in the stern of the Australian U23 eight, which rowed to a silver medal in Copenhagen. Earlier that representative season, he steered both the eight at the World Rowing Cup III in Lucerne.

In 2001 Toon took the ropes of the Australian senior men's eight, the first Queenslander to have done so. They raced at the World Rowing Cup IV in Munich and then at the 2001 World Rowing Championships in Lucerne. The eight failed to make the A final and finished in overall seventh place, crossing first in the B Final. At the 2002 World Rowing Championships he coxed both an Australian four and a pair, and he steered the pair of Tom Laurich and Robert Jahrling to a bronze medal, the first and only men's World Championship medal since the Sydney 2000 Olympics.

Marc Douez coxed the Australian eight to 5th place at the 2003 World Championships but in time for the 2004 Athens Olympics Toon was back in the stern end of the Australian men's eight. In Athens he steered the eight to a bronze medal.

== Post-rowing Life ==
Toon returned to coxing for Queensland in Masters events, coxing the Queensland Masters eight to win the Australian Masters Rowing Championship Interstate eight event on 6 out of 7 occasions from 2013 to 2019.

Previously a pharmacist, since retiring from elite rowing, Toon has studied medicine at the University of Queensland and, subsequently, has become an anesthesiologist practicing in Queensland.

In 2013 Toon adapted and directed the play 'World of Chickens' from the novel by Brisbane writer Nick Earls at Brisbane's Metro Arts Theatre and finished 3rd in the 2016 Queensland final of the Raw Comedy competition, performing stand-up comedy.
