= Jörg Dießner =

German former representative rower

Medal record

Men's rowing

Representing Germany

World Rowing Championships
Gold medal – first place	2006 Eton	M8+
Silver medal – second place	1998 Cologne	M8+
Silver medal – second place	1999 St. Catharines	M2+
Silver medal – second place	2002 Seville	M8+
Silver medal – second place	2007 Munich	M8+
Bronze medal – third place	2001 Lucerne	M8+

Jörg Dießner (born 25 February 1977 in Meissen) is a German former representative rower. He was a 2006 world champion in the German men's eight and a dual Olympian. He consistently represented in German senior crews at World Rowing Championships and Olympic Games between 1998 and 2006.
