= Rafał Hejmej =

Polish rower

Personal information
- Born: 15 July 1980 (age 45) Bydgoszcz, Poland

Sport
- Sport: Rowing
Medal record
Representing Poland
European Rowing Championships
| Silver medal – second place | 2007 Poznań | Eight |
| Silver medal – second place | 2010 Montemor-o-Velho | Eight |
| Silver medal – second place | 2013 Sevilla | Eight |
| Bronze medal – third place | 2008 Marathon | Eight |

Rafał Hejmej (born 15 July 1980) is a Polish rower. He competed at the 2004, 2008 and 2012 Summer Olympics.
