= Aleksandr Lebedev (rower) =

Russian rower

Personal information
- Born: 10 October 1984 (age 41) Kalinin, USSR
- Height: 191 cm (6 ft 3 in)
- Weight: 95 kg (209 lb)

Sport
- Sport: rowing
Medal record
Representing Russia
European Championships
Silver medal – second place	2008 Marathon	Eights

Aleksandr Nikolayevich Lebedev (Russian: Александр Николаевич Лебедев; born 10 October 1984) is a retired rower. Competing the eights he won a silver medal at the 2008 European Championships and placed tenth at the 2009 World Championships.

== Career ==
Competition	Location	Date	Rank
U-23 World Championships	Amsterdam	2005	5th
U-23 World Championships	Hazewinkel	2006	11th
European Championships	Athens	2008	2nd
World Championships	Poznań	2009	10th
