= Matt Deakin =

American rower (born 1980)

Personal information
- Born: May 20, 1980 (age 46) San Francisco, California, U.S.
Medal record
Men's rowing
Representing the United States
Olympic Games
| Gold medal – first place | 2004 Athens | Eight |
World Championships
| Gold medal – first place | 2003 Milano | Coxed four |
| Gold medal – first place | 2005 Kaizu | Eight |
| Bronze medal – third place | 2006 Eton | Eight |

Matt Deakin (born May 20, 1980) is an American competition rower, Olympic champion and world champion.

Deakin was born in San Francisco, California. He won a gold medal in the men's eight at the 2004 Summer Olympics, as a member of the American team. The time 5:19.85 was a new world record. He is a graduate of the University of Washington and a member of the New York Athletic Club Hall of Fame.
