= Piotr Buchalski =

Polish rower

Personal information
- Nationality: Polish
- Born: 4 March 1981 (age 44); Płock, Poland

Sport
- Sport: Rowing

Piotr Buchalski (born 4 March 1981) is a Polish rower. He competed in the men's eight event at the 2004 Summer Olympics.
