= Chris Ahrens (rower) =

American rower (born 1976)

Personal information
- Full name: Christian Ahrens
- Born: July 24, 1976 (age 49) Iowa City, Iowa, U.S.
Medal record
Men's rowing
Representing United States
Olympic Games
Gold medal – first place	2004 Athens	Eight
World Rowing Championships
Gold medal – first place	1995 Tampere	M4+
Gold medal – first place	1997 Aiguebelette	M8+
Gold medal – first place	1998 Cologne	M8+
Gold medal – first place	1999 St. Catharines	M8+

Christian Ahrens (born July 24, 1976) is an American former rower. He is a dual Olympian, an Olympic gold medal winner, and a four-time world champion.

== Early life ==
Ahrens was born in Iowa City, Iowa, on July 24, 1976, to Gary and Patricia Ahrens. His father, Gary, had rowed in high school and at Milwaukee Rowing Club. When Christian was only six years old, his father began teaching him how to row in a flat-bottom boat tied to a clothesline on the Milwaukee River. He began rowing more seriously his freshman year of high school, again coached by his father, after deciding that he "wasn't going to go anywhere in swimming".

== College ==
Ahrens is a 1998 graduate of Princeton University who rowed for the Princeton Tigers and the United States national team. He was honored by The Daily Princetonian as the 18th most successful athlete in the school's history.

== International rowing career ==
Ahrens stroked the gold medal winning United States men's eight at the 1997, 1998, and 1999 world championships, and was in the six seat for their fifth place 2000 Sydney Olympic boat. Ahrens came out of retirement in 2004 to join the US Olympic squad in the three seat of the gold medal-winning boat. This boat was notable not only for being the first US eight to win Olympic gold since 1964, but it also set a new course and world record of 5:19.85. That world best time stood until a Canadian eight took half a second off it in 2012.

Ahrens retired from international rowing immediately upon crossing the finish line at the 2004 Olympics. He lives in Brooklyn with his wife and two daughters.
