= Stefan Szczurowski =

Australian rower (born 1982)

Medal record

Men's rowing

Representing Australia
Bronze medal – third place	2004 Athens	M8+

Stefan Szczurowski (born 17 April 1982) is an Australian rower who represented Australia at the 2004 Summer Olympics in Athens.
