= Stuart Reside =

Australian rower

Personal information
- Born: 6 September 1978 (age 47) Perth, Western Australia
- Education: Aquinas College, Perth

Sport
- Sport: Rowing
- Club: ECU Perth Rowing Club
Medal record
Men's rowing
Representing Australia
Olympic Games
Bronze medal – third place	2004 Athens	Eight
World Rowing Championships
Bronze medal – third place	St Catharines 1999	Quad scull
World Rowing U23 Championships
Gold medal – first place	Glasgow 1998	Quad scull
Junior World Rowing Championships
Gold medal – first place	Glasgow 1996	Single scull

Stuart Reside (born 6 September 1978) is an Australian former rower. He was an Australian national champion, a two-time underage World Champion, a dual Olympian and a medalist at senior world championships and Olympics.

== Club and state rowing ==
Reside was educated at Aquinas College, Perth where he took up rowing. His senior club rowing has been from the ECU Perth Rowing Club.

Reside's first Western Australian state selection came in 1996 in the youth eight who contested the Noel Wilkinson Trophy at the Interstate Regatta within the Australian Rowing Championships In 1997 he was selected to stroke the West Australian men's senior eight competing for the King's Cup at the Interstate Regatta. He stroked further West Australian King's Cup eights in 1998, 1999 and 2004 including their 1999 King's Cup triumph in which they led all the way. He crewed three further WA King's Cup crews of 2000, 2002, 2003.

In ECU Perth Rowing Club colours he contested national championship titles at the Australian Rowing Championships on a number of occasions. He raced for the open men's single sculls title in 1998 and 1999. In 1999 he won the open men's double sculls title with Jonathan Fievez.

He won the WA Institute of Sport Athlete of the Year award in 1998/99.

== International representative rowing ==
Reside's national representative debut came in 1996 when he was selected as Australia's single sculls entrant for the 1996 Junior World Rowing Championships in Glasgow. He won the world junior championship and a gold medal. In 1997 aged nineteen he was elevated to the Australian senior squad and into the quad scull. He raced in the quad at two World Rowing Cups in Europe and then at the 1997 World Rowing Championships in Aiguebelette to a sixth place finish. He held his spot in the quad in 1998 and moved into the stroke seat. They raced at the World Rowing Cup III in Lucerne and then at the 1998 World Rowing Championships in Cologne to a fifth place. With Matthew O'Callaghan changed out for Shaun Colton, Reside, Peter Hardcastle and Martin Inglis also raced as a quad at the 1998 World Rowing U23 Championships in Ioannina, Greece where they won the final and an U23 World Championship title.

Jason Day and Duncan Free stepped into the Australian quad with Reside and Peter Hardcastle in 1999 and they commenced their Olympic campaign for Sydney 2000. They raced at a World Rowing Cup in 1999 and then at the 1999 World Rowing Championships in St Catharines they battled through the preliminaries placing third in their heat, winning their repechage, coming third in their semi-final ( facing the ultimate gold and silver medalists Germany and Ukraine) and then repeating the semi-final result with a third place and bronze medal in the final. In the 2000 Olympic year they raced at two World Rowing Cups before coming to the Sydney 2000 where they made the final and finished in fourth place.

After a post-Olympics break Reside came back into national selection as a sweep oared rower in 2003. He was selected in the Australian men's eight who contested World Rowing Cup III in Lucerne and competed at the 2003 World Rowing Championships in Milan to a fifth placing. He held his place in the two seat at the 2004 Summer Olympics in Athens where the Australian eight raced well to a bronze medal.
