= Sebastian Thormann =

German rower (born 1976)

Medal record

Men's rowing

Representing Germany

World Rowing Championships
Gold medal – first place	2002 Seville	M4-
Silver medal – second place	2001 Lucerne	M4-
Bronze medal – third place	2003 Milan	M4-

Sebastian Thormann (born 21 February 1976 in Wermelskirchen) is a German rower.
