= Enrico Schnabel =

German rower

Medal record

Men's rowing

Representing Germany

World Rowing Championships
Silver medal – second place	1998 Cologne	M8+
Silver medal – second place	1999 St. Catharines	M2+
Silver medal – second place	2002 Seville	M8+
Bronze medal – third place	2001 Lucerne	M8+

Enrico Schnabel (born 13 January 1974 in Dresden) is a German rower.
