= Schinias Olympic Rowing and Canoeing Centre =

Sports venue in Marathon, Greece

Coordinates: 38°9′0″N 24°0′52″E

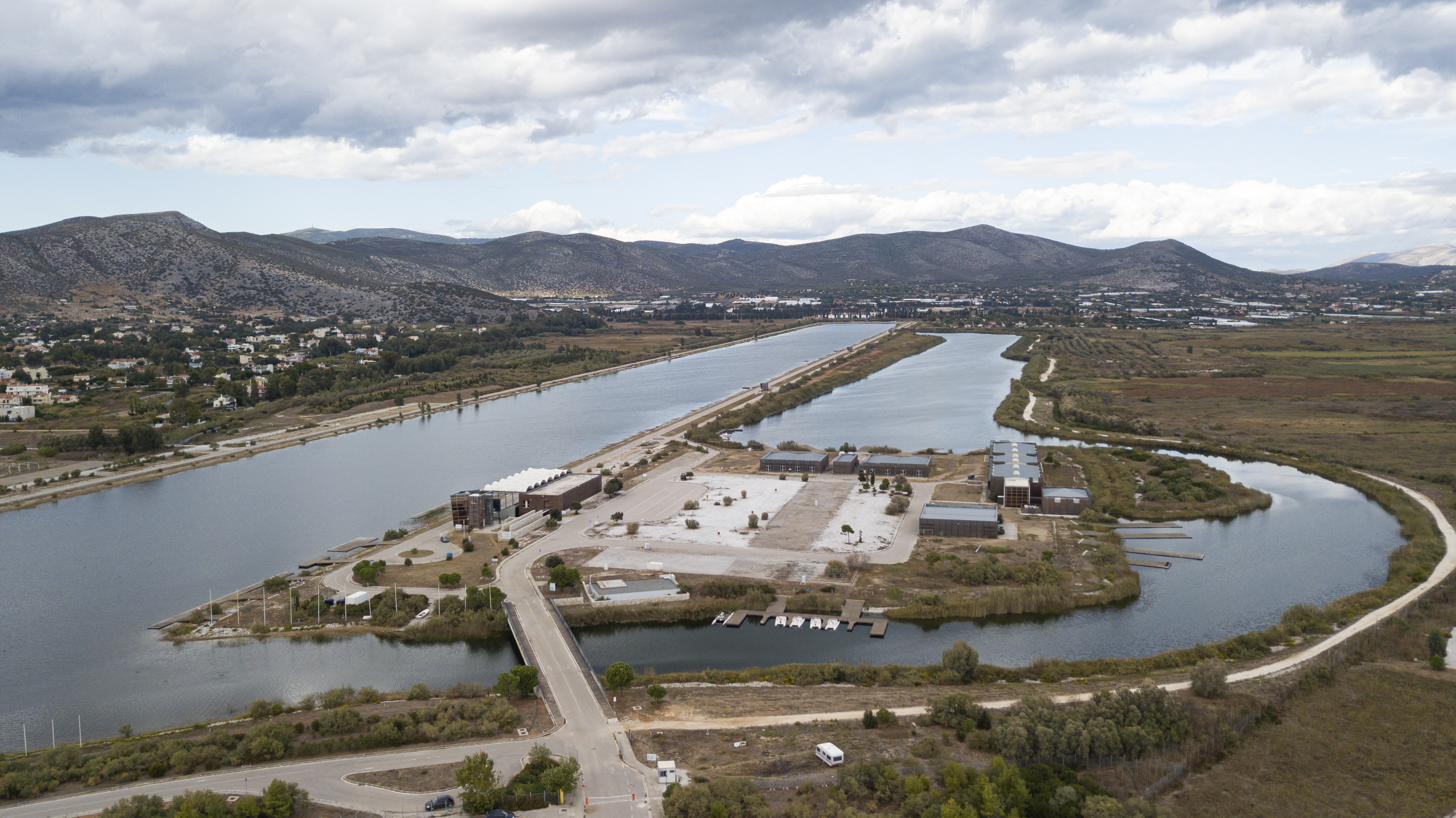
Aerial view

The Schinias Olympic Rowing and Canoeing Centre (Ολυμπιακό Κωπηλατοδρόμιο Σχοινιά) was built to host the rowing and canoe sprint events at the 2004 Summer Olympics in Greece.

It is the most northerly venue of the 2004 Games situated to the east of the town of Marathon. It covers 1.24 km^{2} and has a spectator capacity of 14,000. It is a part of Schinias National Park.

Although not fully completed until January 31, 2004, it held its first successful competition, the World Rowing Junior Championships, in August 2003. During these championships, many boats became waterlogged due to gale-force winds and the resulting water conditions. Most of the final rounds were raced over a shortened course to avoid worse water in the second half of the 2 km lake.

During construction there was controversy over environmental destruction as wetlands were remodelled for its construction.

The centre is one of only three FISA-approved training centers in the world, the others being in Munich and Seville. It hosts domestic rowing and canoeing meetings, and has hosted the 2008 European Rowing Championships in September 2008. After the 2004 Olympics, the facility was completely reconstructed by the German company Hochtief.

== See also ==
- 2004 Canoe Sprint World Cup
