= Christophe Lattaignant =

French rower (born 1971)

Medal record

Men's rowing

Representing France

World Championships
| Gold medal – first place | 1997 Aiguebelette | M4+ |
| Gold medal – first place | 2001 Lucerne | M4+ |
| Gold medal – first place | 2001 Lucerne | LM8+ |
| Silver medal – second place | 1995 Tampere | M2+ |

Christophe Lattaignant (born 18 September 1971 in Boulogne-sur-Mer) is a French rowing cox. He competed for France at the 2004 Summer Olympics and won four medals at World Rowing Championships from 1995 through 2001.
