= Joe Stankevicius =

Canadian rower (born 1978

Joe J Stankevicius (born September 1, 1978 in Dundas, Ontario) is a Canadian rower. He won the gold medal at both the 2003 and 2002 world championships for Canada's men's eight team in Milan, Italy and Seville, Spain respectively. He competed at the 2004 Summer Olympics.
