= Jonno Devlin =

Irish rower

Medal record

Men's rowing

Representing the United Kingdom

World Rowing Championships
Bronze medal – third place	2003 Milan	M8+

Jonathan "Jonno" Devlin (born 17 March 1976 in Springs, South Africa) is an Irish rower. He rowed for Great Britain until 2007.
