= Michał Stawowski =

Polish rower

Personal information
- Nationality: Polish
- Born: 11 January 1983 (age 42); Bydgoszcz, Poland

Sport
- Sport: Rowing

Michał Stawowski (born 11 January 1983) is a Polish rower. He competed at the 2004 Summer Olympics and the 2008 Summer Olympics.
