= Stuart Welch =

Australian rower

Personal information
- Born: 15 November 1977 (age 48)
- Education: Sydney Grammar School
- Years active: 1995-2004

Sport
- Sport: Rowing
- Club: UTS Haberfield Rowing Club
Medal record
Men's rowing
Representing Australia
Olympic Games
| Silver medal – second place | 2000 Sydney | M8+ |
| Bronze medal – third place | 2004 Athens | M8+ |
World Rowing U23 Championships
| Silver medal – second place | 1997 Milan | BM4- |

Stuart Thomas Welch (born 15 November 1977) is an Australian former representative rower who won medals at his two Olympic games appearances.

== Club and state rowing ==
Born in Sydney, Welch was educated at Sydney Grammar School where he took up rowing. His senior club rowing was from the UTS Haberfield Rowing Club on Sydney's Iron Cove.

New South Wales state representation first came for Welch in the 1996 youth eight who contested and won the Noel Wilkinson Trophy at the Interstate Regatta within the Australian Rowing Championships. He rowed again in the New South Wales youth eight in 1997. In 1999 he was selected in the New South Wales men's eight to race for the King's Cup at the Interstate Regatta.

== International representative rowing ==
Welch made his Australian representative debut still aged sixteen in the men's U23 eight who raced at the 1995 World Rowing U23 Championships in Groningen. That eight finished in eighth place. In 1997 he was selected in an U23 coxless four who competed at the World Rowing Cup III in Lucerne before racing at the 1997 World Rowing U23 Championships in Milan to a silver medal. Welch stroked that four. In 1998 Welch was still young enough to contest U23 World Championships and at Ionnina in Greece he rowed in the U23 eight who won the championship and a gold medal.

In 2000 Welch was elevated to the Australian senior representative squad and into the Australian eight. Welch raced in the eight at two Rowing World Cups in the lead up campaign as well as at the Henley Royal Regatta where they raced as an Australian Institute of Sport eight and won that year's Grand Challenge Cup. At Sydney 2000 with Welch in the six seat, the Australian eight won their heat in a pace that blew away the eventual gold medallists Great Britain. However in the final they started slowly and their late sprint home left them 0.8 seconds behind the Brits at the line, taking the silver Olympic medal in a thrilling finish.

Welch studied at Cambridge University, as a member of St Edmund's College, following Sydney 2000 and he raced in the Cambridge boat for The Boat Race in 2002. He was back in Australian national contention in 2003 when he competed at the 2003 World Rowing Championships at Milan in the coxless four which placed fourth. In the 2004 Olympic year he came back into the Australian eight. At Athens 2004 Welch was in the three seat of the eight when they finished in third place and took the bronze medal.
