= Joseph Hansen (rower) =

American rower (born 1979)

Personal information
- Born: August 13, 1979 (age 47) Bakersfield, California, U.S.
Medal record
Men's rowing
Representing the United States
Olympic Games
Gold medal – first place	2004 Athens	Men's eight

Joseph "Joey" Hansen (born August 13, 1979) is an American competition rower. He represented the United States at the 2004 Summer Olympics in Athens, where he received a gold medal in men's eights.
