= Jean-David Bernard =

French rower

Medal record

Men's rowing

Representing France

World Rowing Championships
Silver medal – second place	2007 Munich	M4x
Bronze medal – third place	1999 St. Catharines	LM4-

Jean-David Bernard (born 27 July 1977 in Melun) is a French rower.
