= Sebastian Schulte =

German rower (born 1978)

Medal record

Men's rowing

Representing Germany

World Rowing Championships
Gold medal – first place	2006 Eton	M8+
Silver medal – second place	2002 Seville	M8+
Silver medal – second place	2007 Munich	M8+
Bronze medal – third place	2001 Lucerne	M8+
Bronze medal – third place	2005 Gifu	M8+

Sebastian Schulte (born 13 December 1978 in Wiesbaden) is a German former representative rower. He was a 2006 world champion in the German men's eight and an Olympian. He consistently represented in the German men's eight - the Deutschlandachter- at World Rowing Championships and Olympic Games between 2001 and 2007.

He rowed in the 2005, 2006 and 2007 University Boat Races for Cambridge University securing one victory in the 2007 Cambridge eight.

== See also ==
- List of Cambridge University Boat Race crews
- Rowing at the Summer Olympics
