= Sebastian Kosiorek =

Polish rower

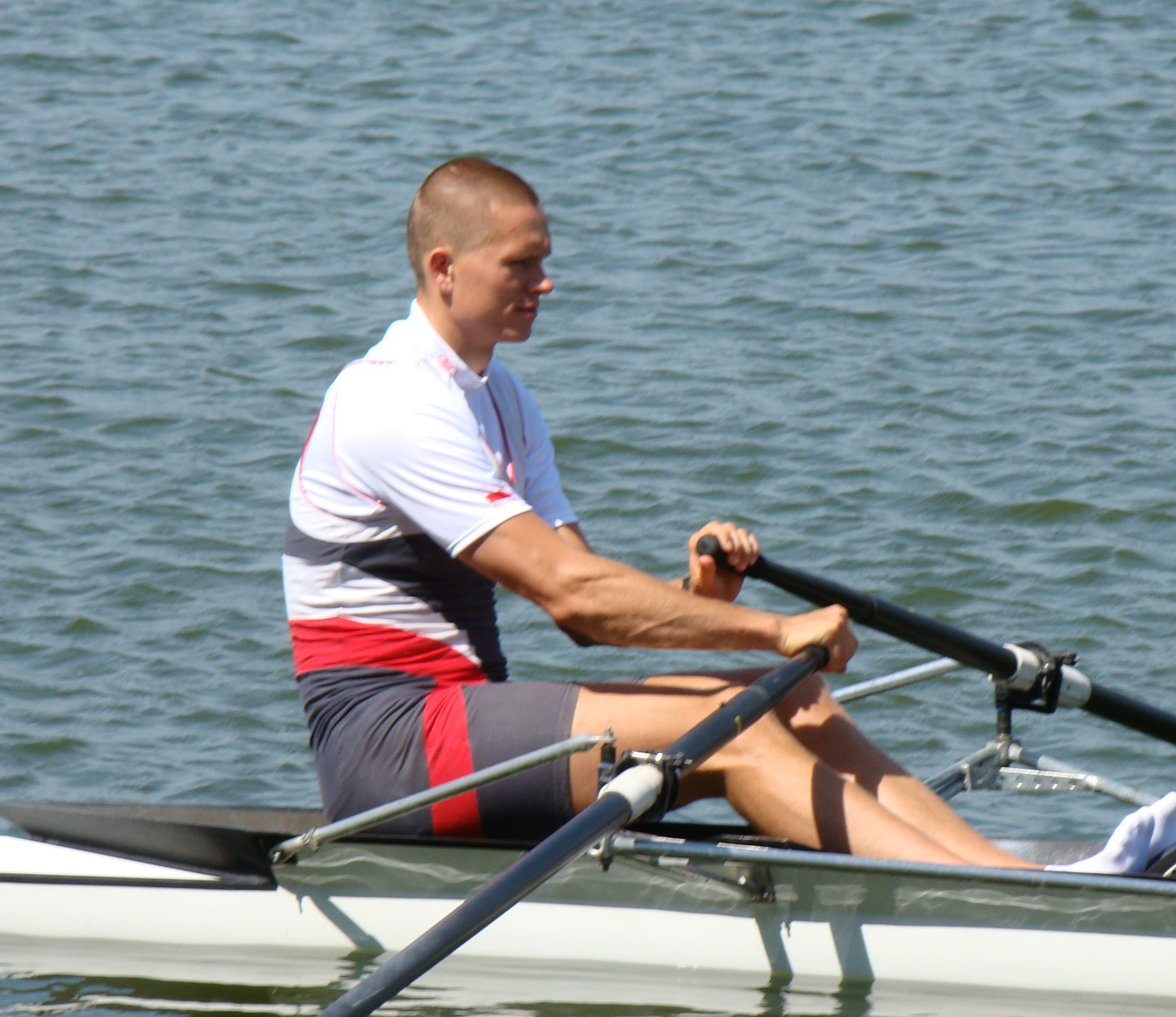
- Sebastian Kosiorek

Personal information
- Nationality: Polish
- Born: 28 January 1983 (age 42); Ełk, Poland

Sport
- Sport: Rowing

Sebastian Kosiorek (born 28 January 1983) is a Polish rower. He competed at the 2004 Summer Olympics and the 2008 Summer Olympics.
