= Thorsten Engelmann =

German rower

Thorsten Engelmann (born 20 July 1981 in East Berlin, East Germany) is a German rower. Engelmann started rowing at age 9 because his father was the president of a rowing club in Berlin. He continued training while earning his pre-diploma in economics at school, and was a member of the German national squad.

Engelmann became world champion in the eight in 2006, won the silver medal in the 2002 and 2007 World Championships, and won bronze twice, in 2001 and 2005. He placed fourth in the Summer Olympic Games in 2004. Engelmann is also a former World Under–23 champion from 2000 and was the overall world cup winner in 2001–2003 and 2005. In 2005, Engelmann was a member of the Dortmund crew that won the Grand Challenge Cup at Henley Royal Regatta. He also rowed for Cambridge University in the 2006 Boat Race (losing against Oxford). He competed as a member of the winning Cambridge Crew in the 2007 Boat Race, where he weighed in at 110.8 kilograms (244 lb), the heaviest rower ever to compete in the contest.

In July 2007 Engelmann did not complete his academic course and instead returned to the German national rowing team to prepare for the Beijing Olympics. It was reported that Oxford asked for the 2007 race to be awarded to them, or declared void, as Engelmann was so important to the crew and appeared not to have been a genuine student. Although Cambridge refused to void the event, Engelmann was denied his Blue, making him the only Boat Race crew member not to have a Blue.

In May 2010, Engelmann took part in the game show Schlag den Raab. He was, however, unsuccessful in winning the €500,000 jackpot.

== See also ==
- List of Cambridge University Boat Race crews
- Rowing at the Summer Olympics
