= Geert-Jan Derksen =

Dutch rower (born 1975)

Olympic medal record

Men's rowing

Representing the Netherlands
Silver medal – second place	2004 Athens	M8+

Geert Jan Derksen (born 2 May 1975 in Didam) is a Dutch rower. He won silver at the men's eight event at the 2004 Summer Olympics in Athens. He also competed at the 2000 Summer Olympics.
