= Daniël Mensch =

Dutch rower

Medal record

Men's rowing

Representing the Netherlands

Olympic Games
Silver medal – second place	2004 Athens	Eight

Daniël Theodoor Mensch (born 4 October 1978 in Sliedrecht) is a Dutch athlete who won the silver medal in the 2004 Summer Olympics for rowing as a member of the 8-man Dutch rowing team. Additionally, he was a member of the Maastricht rowing fraternity MSRV Saurus.
