= Michiel Bartman =

Dutch rower (born 1967)

Medal record

Men's rowing

Representing the Netherlands

Olympic Games
Gold medal – first place	1996 Atlanta	Eight
Silver medal – second place	2000 Sydney	Quadruple sculls
Silver medal – second place	2004 Athens	Eight

Michiel Bernhard Emiel Marie Bartman (born 19 May 1967 in Badhoevedorp, North Holland) is a former rower from the Netherlands, who won a total of three Olympic medals during his career. A member of the Nereus Rowing Club from Amsterdam, he won the gold medal in Atlanta with the Holland Acht (Holland Eights), followed by silver in Sydney (Quadruple Sculls) and silver (Eights) once again in Athens. He also won three medals at the World Championships, bronze in the coxed four in 1994, silver with the Holland Acht in 1995 and silver in the Quadruple Sculls in 2001. Notably the Netherlands eight set the world record in the men's eight in Atlanta that stood until 2002. Bartman's earned notoriety within the international rowing community as a fierce competitor with a rare ability to time his best performances for the Olympic Games.

After the 2004 Summer Olympics Bartman retired and he became the head coach for Vesper Boat Club in Philadelphia, United States. In December 2004 he was named Amsterdam Sportsman of the Year, together with fellow rower Diederik Simon. In 2011 he was named head coach of Radcliffe lightweight crew (Harvard University). In 2013 Bartman went on to become the head coach of the Harvard University men's lightweight crew. From 2016 to 2019, Bartman worked as head coach and men's varsity coach at Friends of Port Rowing Club on Long Island, NY. In 2019, Bartman took the position of assistant women's rowing coach at Temple University.

Awards
Preceded by Johan Kenkhuis	Amsterdam Sportsman of the Year; 2004	Succeeded by Guillaume Elmont
