= Chun Wei Cheung =

Dutch rower (1972–2006)

Olympic medal record

Men's Rowing
Silver medal – second place	2004 Athens	Eight

Chun Wei Cheung (15 April 1972 in Amsterdam – 14 October 2006) was a Dutch rowing cox and Olympic silver medallist.

Cheung started coxing with Nereus Rowing Club in Amsterdam in 1992, later joining the Dutch National Team and coxing the men's coxed pair at the 1996 World Rowing Championships to bronze. He returned to coxing as the cox of the silver medal-winning Dutch men's eights at the 2004 Summer Olympics in Athens.

He was diagnosed with liver cancer shortly after coxing the Dutch eights at Henley Royal Regatta and the 2006 World Rowing Championships, and died, aged 34. He was buried at Zorgvlied cemetery. The boat of the Dutch men's eight at the 2008 Summer Olympics was named after Cheung.
