= Gerritjan Eggenkamp =

Dutch rower (born 1975)

Medal record

Men's rowing

Representing the Netherlands

Olympic Games
Silver medal – second place	2004 Athens	Eight

Gerritjan Eggenkamp (14 November 1975) is a Dutch rower.

Born in Leiden, Netherlands, Eggenkamp started rowing aged 12 at Het Spaarne rowing club in Heemstede, and first competed internationally as a Junior, coming 9th in the coxless four at the 1993 Junior World Championships. He was named as the spare man for the Dutch Men's coxless four for the 1996 Olympics, and then rowed in the coxless four at the 1997 and 1998 World Championships. He was in the Dutch men's eight for the 2000 Olympic Games. In 2002, he became the first Dutch rower to compete in the 148th Oxford- Cambridge Boat Race, rowing in the three seat for the winning Oxford crew.

At the 2004 Olympic Games he rowed in the Silver medal-winning Dutch Men's 8+.

In September 2018 he was elected treasurer of FISA, the International Rowing Federation.

== Rowing achievements ==
2004: Olympic Games, Athens 8+ (2nd)
2002: Oxford-Cambridge Boat Race (winners)
2001: World Championships (10th)
2000: Olympic Games, Sydney 8+ (8th)
1998: World Championships 4- (8th)
1997: World Championships 4- (7th)
1996: Olympic Games – spare Men's 4-
1995: U23 Men's 2- (silver)
1993: Junior World Championships Men's 4- (9th)
