= Matt Rich =

Matt or Matthew Rich may refer to:

- Matt Rich (publicist) (born 1954), American public relations executive
- Matt Rich (rower) (born 1975), American rower
- Matthew Rich (born 1987), Scottish professional ice hockey player
