= Delgaudio =

Delgaudio, DelGaudio, or Del Gaudio is a surname. Notable people with the surname include:

- Derek DelGaudio, American performance artist, writer, and magician
- Eugene Delgaudio (born 1955), American politician and conservative activist
- Matthew Del Gaudio
- Giuseppe Del Gaudio
- Pio Del Gaudio

== See also ==
- Gaudio
