= Michael McBryde =

Australian rower (born 1981)

Personal information
- Born: 5 October 1981 (age 44)

Sport
- Sport: Rowing
- Club: Toowong Rowing Club; Queensland Uni Boat Club
Medal record
Men's rowing
Representing Australia
World Rowing Championships
Silver medal – second place	2003 Milan	LM4x
Bronze medal – third place	2007 Munich	LM2-
World Rowing U23 Championships
Gold medal – first place	2002 Genoa	LM4x

Michael McBryde (born 5 October 1981 in Adelaide) is an Australian former lightweight rower. He was a national champion, an U23 World Champion and a medallist at senior World Championships.

== Club and state rowing ==
Raised in Queensland, McBryde's senior club rowing was from the Toowong Rowing Club and later the Queensland University Boat Club in Brisbane.

In 2001 McBryde was first selected to represent Queensland in the men's lightweight four contesting the Penrith Cup at the Interstate Regatta within the Australian Rowing Championships. He raced in further President's Cup lightweight fours for Queensland in 2002, 2003, 2004, 2006 and 2010. In 2010 he was also selected in the Queensland men's senior eights to contest the King's Cup at the Interstate Regatta.

In 2004 he contested the Australian national lightweight pair title at the Australian Rowing Championships in Toowong Rowing Club colours. In 2007 he contested and won the national lightweight pair title racing for the QUBC and rowing with Todd Skipworth.

== International representative rowing ==
McBryde made his Australian representative debut in a lightweight quad scull at the 2002 World Rowing Cup II in Lucerne. He then raced in that same quad that year at the World Rowing U23 Championships in Genoa to a gold medal. In 2003 he was elevated to the Australian senior lightweight squad. He competed in the lightweight quad at the 2003 World Rowing Cup III in Lucerne. Then at the 2003 World Rowing Championships in Milan he raced in the two seat of the quad scull to a silver medal.

In 2004 McBryde switched to sweep-oared boats. He was selected to compete at the 2004 World Rowing Championships in a lightweight coxless pair with Tim O'Callaghan. They rowed to a fourth placing. In 2005 he was in the lightweight coxless four for their campaign at the 2005 World Rowing Championships in Gifu, Japan where they finished in fourth place. He held his seat in the Australian lightweight coxless four throughout 2006 and rowed at two World Rowing Cups in Europe before contesting the 2006 World Championships at Eton Dorney where they finished sixth.

In 2007 McBryde moved into the Australian lightweight coxless pair with West Australian Ross Brown. They rowed at a World Cup in Lucerne and then at the 2007 World Rowing Championships in Munich, they took the bronze medal.

He came back into representative contention in 2010 vying for a seat in either the Australian lightweight eight or the coxless four. He raced in a lightweight four at two World Rowing Cups that year but didn't make selection to either boat for the 2010 World Championships. He had rowed his last regatta as an Australian representative.
