= Li Quan =

Li Quan or Quan Li may refer to:

People with the surname Li

- Li Quan (Taoist), Tang dynasty Taoist
- Li Quan (general) (died 1231), rebel leader during the Jin dynasty
- Li Quan (martial artist) (born 1973), Chinese martial artist
- Li Quan (rower), Chinese rower

People with the surname Quan

- Li Quan (wildlife conservationist), UK-based Chinese wildlife conservationist
