= Rossit =

Rossit is a surname. Notable people with the surname include:

- Desirée Rossit (born 1994), Italian triathlete
- Marjolaine Rossit (born 1980), French rower

== See also ==
- Rossi (surname)
