= Porzig =

Porzig is a surname. Notable people with the surname include:

- David Porzig (born 1974), South African-born rower who represented Australia
- Nick Porzig (born 1972), South African-born rower who represented Australia in two Olympics
