= Jason Flickinger =

American rower

Jason Flickinger (born 9 May 1977 in Ohio, United States) is an American rower, Boat Race winner, and a former World Champion.

== Education ==
Flickinger was educated at Corning-Painted Post East High School and Princeton University. He then enrolled at Keble College, Oxford where he undertook a Masters of Business Administration.

== The Boat Race ==
Whilst at Oxford University, Flickinger was a member of Oxford University Boat Club and took part in the Boat Race in 2005. Both universities had extremely strong intakes that year, with Cambridge boasting several world champions and the Oxford crew including Olympic silver medallist Barney Williams. Oxford, with Flickinger in the seven seat, won the contest by two lengths in a time of 16 minutes 42 minutes.

== International rowing career ==
Flickinger won his first senior international vest in 2001. He sat in the three seat of the United States eight, which won the first World Cup event of the 2001 season, but then competed at the World Championships that year in a coxed four, and finished 6th. After a break from international rowing, Jason was part of the United States coxed four that won gold at the World Championships in Milan in 2003.

== Achievements ==
=== World Championships ===
- 2003 Seville - Gold, Coxed four (three)
- 2001 Lucerne - 6th, Coxed four (three)

=== World Cups ===
- 2001 Mercer Lake - Gold, Eight (three)
