= Martin Hasse =

Martin Hasse may refer to:

- Martin Hasse (rower), German lightweight rower
- Martin Karl Hasse, German university lecturer, composer and music writer

== See also ==
- Martin Haase, German linguistics professor
