= Michael Blomquist =

American rower

Personal information
- Born: August 14, 1981 (age 44) Winston-Salem, North Carolina, U.S.
Medal record
Men's rowing
Representing United States
World Rowing Championships
Gold medal – first place	2005 Gifu	M8+

Michael Blomquist (born August 14, 1981 in Winston-Salem, North Carolina) is an American rower and a former World Champion.

== Education ==
Blomquist was educated at Phillips Exeter Academy and Harvard University. He then enrolled at St Peter's College, Oxford where he undertook a Master of Science degree in Nature, Society & Environmental Policy.

== The Boat Race ==
Whilst at Oxford University, Blomquist was a member of Oxford University Boat Club and took part in the Boat Race in 2005. Both universities had extremely strong intakes that year, with Cambridge boasting several world champions and the Oxford crew including Olympic silver-medallist Barney Williams. Oxford, with Mike in the six seat, won the epic contest by 2 lengths in a time of 16 minutes and 42 seconds.

== International rowing career ==
Blomquist won his first senior international vest in 2001. He sat in the two-seat of the United States Coxed Four, which made the final of the World Championships in Lucerne, and again a year later in Seville. After a break from international rowing, he returned in 2005, becoming World Champion as part of the United States Eight, at the World Championships in Gifu. In 2006 Mike was in the Coxless Four, which finished fourth at the World Championships at Eton.

== Achievements ==
=== World Championships ===
- 2006 Eton – 4th, Coxless Four (two)
- 2005 Gifu – Gold, Eight (four)
- 2002 Seville – 6th, Coxed Four (two)
- 2001 Lucerne – 6th, Coxed Four (two)

=== World Cups ===
- 2005 Eton – 9th, Coxless Pair (stroke)
