= Tom Lehmann =

Tom Lehmann may refer to:

- Thomas Lehmann (born 1958), a game designer
- Tom Lehmann (rower) (born 1987), a German rower
- Tommy Lehmann (born 1964), a Swedish retired professional ice hockey centre
- Tom Lehman (born 1959), an American professional golfer
