= Galy =

Galy may refer to:

- Galy Records, a Canadian independent record label
- Galy Galiano (born 1958), Colombian composer
- Audrey Galy (born 1984), French rower

== See also ==
- Gali (disambiguation)
