= Ross Brown (rower) =

Australian rower (born 1981)

Personal information
- Born: 17 October 1981 (age 44)

Sport
- Sport: Rowing
- Club: Swan River Rowing Club
Medal record
Men's rowing
Representing Australia
World Rowing U23 Championships
Gold medal – first place	2003 Belgrade	LM4-
Silver medal – second place	2002 Genoa	LM2-
World Rowing Championships
Gold medal – first place	2011 Bled	LM8+
Silver medal – second place	2010 Karapiro	LM8+
Bronze medal – third place	2004 Banyoles	LM8+
Bronze medal – third place	2007 Munich	LM2-

Ross Brown (born 17 October 1981) is an Australian former national and world champion lightweight rower.

== Club and state rowing ==
Born in Bentley, Western Australia, Brown was educated at Aquinas College, where he took up rowing. His senior club rowing was with the Swan River Rowing Club before winning a scholarship to the Western Australian Institute of Sport.

From 2002 to 2004 and from 2006 to 2011 Brown was selected to represent Western Australia in the men's lightweight four contesting the Penrith Cup at the Interstate Regatta within the Australian Rowing Championships. He was in the victorious West Australian fours of 2007, 2008 and 2009.

== International representative rowing ==
Brown first represented Australia at the 2002 World Rowing Cup II in Lucerne in a lightweight coxless pair with his West Australian team-mate Tom Nicholls which placed sixth. They rowed together that same year in the World Rowing U23 Championships in Genoa taking the silver medal. In 2003 Brown and Nicholls teamed up with the Tasmanians Tom Gibson and Cameron Wurf in a lightweight coxless four. They finished in overall twelfth place at the World Rowing Cup III in Lucerne but then at the 2003 World Rowing U23 Championships in Belgrade they took the gold medal and claimed an U23 World Championship.

At the 2004 World Rowing Championships in Banyoles he won a bronze medal in the lightweight eight. At Gifu, Japan 2005 he raced in a lightweight coxless pair with George Roberts and finished in eleventh place. He continued in the coxless pair in 2007 and at the World Rowing Championships with Michael McBryde he won bronze. In 2009 he rowed in a lightweight coxless four at the World Championships to a fourteenth placing.

In 2010 at the World Championships in Lake Karapiro, Brown was seated at bow in the Australian men's lightweight eight who placed second and won the silver medal. The lightweight eight stayed together into 2011 with the changeout of Perry Ward and Angus Tyers for Rod Chisolm and Tom Gibson and a move of Darryn Purcell into the stroke seat. At the 2011 World Championships in Bled they raced their final to perfection coming through the field from the 500mark, sitting second at the 1000 and the 1500, and running down the Italians in the last 200m to take the gold by 0.17seconds, winning Brown his first and only World Championship title.

== Post competitive rowing ==
After winning gold at the 2011 World Rowing Championships in the men's lightweight eight, he became the High Performance Development Officer with Rowing Australia.
