= George Roberts (rower) =

Personal information
- Born: 28 August 1980 (age 46)

Sport
- Country: Australia
- Sport: Rowing
- Club: Huon Rowing Club
Medal record
Men's rowing
Representing Australia
World Rowing Championships
Bronze medal – third place	2004 Banyoles	LM8-

George Roberts (born 28 August 1980) is a Tasmanian born Australian former representative lightweight rower. He won a bronze medal at the 2004 World Rowing Championships.

== Club and state rowing ==
Roberts was raised in Hobart. His senior club rowing was from the Huon Rowing Club in southern Tasmania. In 2002 he held a scholarship with the Tasmanian Institute of Sport.

He made state selection for Tasmania in the three seat of the 2000 youth eight contesting the Noel Wilkinson Trophy at the Interstate Regatta within the Australian Rowing Championships. In 2003 and in 2005 he was selected in the Tasmanian's senior men's eight contesting the King's Cup at the Interstate Regatta.

== International representative rowing ==
Roberts made his Australian representative debut in 2004 straight into the senior squad in the lightweight eight which was crewed by five Tasmanian rowers. That boat rowed to bronze medal at the 2004 World Rowing Championships in Banyoles, Spain.

In 2005 he rowed the lightweight coxless pair with West Australian Ross Brown at the 2005 World Rowing Championships in Gizu. They finished in eleventh place.
