= Lodigiani =

Lodigiani is a plural demonym for the Italian city (and province) of Lodi.

It may refer to:

== People ==
Lodigiani is an Italian surname. Notable people with this surname include:

- Alessandro Lodigiani (born 1980), Italian rower
- Dario Lodigiani (1916–2008), American baseball player

== Other ==
- A.S. Lodigiani, Italian football club
