= Rowing at the 2008 Summer Olympics – Men's coxless pair =

Men's coxless pair at the Games of the XXIX Olympiad

Medalists
1st place, gold medalist(s)		Drew Ginn; Duncan Free	Australia
2nd place, silver medalist(s)		Dave Calder; Scott Frandsen	Canada
3rd place, bronze medalist(s)		Nathan Twaddle; George Bridgewater	New Zealand

Men's coxless pair competition at the 2008 Summer Olympics in Beijing was held between August 9 and 16, at the Shunyi Olympic Rowing-Canoeing Park.

This rowing event was a sweep event, meaning that each rower has one oar and rows on only one side. Two rowers crewed each boat, with no coxswain. The competition consists of multiple rounds. Finals were held to determine the placing of each boat; these finals were given letters with those nearer to the beginning of the alphabet meaning a better ranking. Semifinals were named based on which finals they fed, with each semifinal having two possible finals.

During the first round three heats were held. The top three boats in each heat advanced to the A/B semifinals, while all others were sent to the repechage. In the repechage, each boat had another chance to advance to the A/B semifinals, with the top three boats doing so. The remaining repechage finishers were sent to the C final.

Only A/B semifinals were held. For each of the two semifinal races, the top three boats moved on to the better of the two finals, while the bottom three boats went to the lesser of the two finals. For example, a second-place finish in an A/B semifinal would result in advancement to the A final.

The third and final round was the Finals. Each final determined a set of rankings. The A final determined the medals, along with the rest of the places through 6th. The B final gave rankings from 7th to 12th. The C final determined the places lower than 12th.

== Schedule ==
All times are China Standard Time (UTC+8)

Date	Time	Round
Saturday, August 9, 2008	16:10-16:40	Heats
Monday, August 11, 2008	16:50-17:00	Repechage
Wednesday, August 13, 2008	16:10-16:30	Semifinals A/B
Wednesday, August 13, 2008	17:20-17:30	Final C
Friday, August 15, 2008	17:20-17:30	Final B
Saturday, August 16, 2008	16:30-16:40	Final A

== Results ==
=== Heats ===
Qualification Rules: 1-3->SA/B, 4..->R

==== Heat 1 ====
Rank	Rowers	Country	Time	Notes
1	Erwan Peron, Laurent Cadot	France	6:46.57	SA/B
2	Giuseppe De Vita, Raffaello Leonardo	Italy	6:51.01	SA/B
3	Dave Calder, Scott Frandsen	Canada	6:54.88	SA/B
4	Piotr Hojka, Jarosław Godek	Poland	7:01.90	R
5	Tyler Winklevoss, Cameron Winklevoss	United States	7:13.64	R

==== Heat 2 ====
Rank	Rowers	Country	Time	Notes
1	Drew Ginn, Duncan Free	Australia	6:41.15	SA/B
2	Shaun Keeling, Ramon di Clemente	South Africa	6:45.26	SA/B
3	Tom Lehmann, Felix Drahotta	Germany	6:48.60	SA/B
4	Robin Bourne-Taylor, Tom Solesbury	Great Britain	6:59.48	R
5	Morten Nielsen, Thomas Larsen	Denmark	7:17.43	R

==== Heat 3 ====
Rank	Rowers	Country	Time	Notes
1	Nathan Twaddle, George Bridgewater	New Zealand	6:41.65	SA/B
2	Goran Jagar, Nikola Stojić	Serbia	6:46.71	SA/B
3	Jakub Makovička, Václav Chalupa	Czech Republic	6:52.50	SA/B
4	Siniša Skelin, Nikša Skelin	Croatia	7:16.35	R

=== Repechage ===
Qualification Rules: 1-3->SA/B, 4..->FC

Rank	Rowers	Country	Time	Notes
1	Tyler Winklevoss, Cameron Winklevoss	United States	6:36.87	SA/B
2	Siniša Skelin, Nikša Skelin	Croatia	6:38.30	SA/B
3	Morten Nielsen, Thomas Larsen	Denmark	6:38.33	SA/B
4	Robin Bourne-Taylor, Tom Solesbury	Great Britain	6:41.43	FC
5	Piotr Hojka, Jarosław Godek	Poland	6:44.19	FC

=== Semifinals A/B ===
Qualification Rules: 1-3->FA, 4..->FB

==== Semifinal A/B 1 ====
Rank	Athlete	Country	Time	Notes
1	Dave Calder, Scott Frandsen	Canada	6:34.02	FA
2	Nathan Twaddle, George Bridgewater	New Zealand	6:36.05	FA
3	Shaun Keeling, Ramon di Clemente	South Africa	6:37.18	FA
4	Jakub Makovička, Václav Chalupa	Czech Republic	6:37.88	FB
5	Erwan Peron, Laurent Cadot	France	6:44.29	FB
6	Siniša Skelin, Nikša Skelin	Croatia	7:14.50	FB

==== Semifinal A/B 2 ====
Rank	Athlete	Country	Time	Notes
1	Drew Ginn, Duncan Free	Australia	6:34.29	FA
2	Tyler Winklevoss, Cameron Winklevoss	United States	6:36.65	FA
3	Tom Lehmann, Felix Drahotta	Germany	6:37.26	FA
4	Goran Jagar, Nikola Stojić	Serbia	6:38.96	FB
5	Giuseppe De Vita, Raffaello Leonardo	Italy	6:47.30	FB
6	Morten Nielsen, Thomas Larsen	Denmark	6:48.65	FB

=== Finals ===
==== Final C ====
Rank	Athlete	Country	Time	Notes
1	Robin Bourne-Taylor, Tom Solesbury	Great Britain	6:46.83	
2	Piotr Hojka, Jarosław Godek	Poland	6:53.68	

==== Final B ====
Rank	Athlete	Country	Time	Notes
1	Goran Jagar, Nikola Stojić	Serbia	6:49.12	
2	Jakub Makovička, Václav Chalupa	Czech Republic	6:52.57	
3	Erwan Peron, Laurent Cadot	France	6:54.40	
4	Morten Nielsen, Thomas Larsen	Denmark	6:55.37	
5	Dario Dentale, (Note: Giuseppe De Vita withdrew due to illness and was replaced by Dario Dentale.) Raffaello Leonardo	Italy	7:04.91	
6	Siniša Skelin, Nikša Skelin	Croatia	7:11.19	

==== Final A ====
Rank	Athlete	Country	Time	Notes
Gold medal	Drew Ginn, Duncan Free	Australia	6:37.44	
Silver medal	Dave Calder, Scott Frandsen	Canada	6:39.55	
Bronze medal	Nathan Twaddle, George Bridgewater	New Zealand	6:44.19	
4	Tom Lehmann, Felix Drahotta	Germany	6:47.40	
5	Shaun Keeling, Ramon di Clemente	South Africa	6:47.83	
6	Tyler Winklevoss, Cameron Winklevoss	United States	7:05.58	
