= Jonathan Mathis =

French rower (born 1981)

Personal information
- Born: 7 May 1981 (age 45) Nancy, France
- Height: 6 ft 3 in (1.91 m)
- Weight: 86 kg (190 lb)
Medal record
Men's rowing
Representing France
World Rowing Championships
Gold medal – first place	2005 Gifu	M4+

Johnatan Mathis (born 7 May 1981, in Nancy) is a French rower.
