= Deon Birtwistle =

Australian former lightweight rower

Personal information
- Born: 4 September 1980 (age 45)

Sport
- Sport: Rowing
- Club: North Esk Rowing Club
Medal record
Men's rowing
Representing Australia
World Rowing Championships
Silver medal – second place	2003 Milan	LM4x
World Rowing U23 Championships
Gold medal – first place	2002 Linz	LM4x

Deon Birtwistle (born 4 September 1980 in Launceston) is an Australian lightweight rower. He was three times a national champion, an U23 World Champion and a silver medallist at the 2003 World Championships. He continued to compete at the national elite level into his 40s.

== Club and state rowing ==
Born in Tasmania Birtwistle's senior club rowing was from the North Esk Rowing Club in Launceston.

Birtwistle came into Tasmanian state contention at a time when his state dominated Australian lightweight rowing. He was down the order behind seasoned national champions Shane Broad, Samuel Beltz, Darren Balmforth and Simon Burgess. It was 2003 before Birtwistle was selected to represent Tasmania in the men's lightweight four who contested and won the Penrith Cup at the Interstate Regatta within the Australian Rowing Championships. He made further Penrith Cup appearances for Tasmania in 2006 and 2009 with that 2006 crew being victorious. In 2023 he was selected in an all North Esk crew with his son Oscar to again race as the Tasmanian entrants for the Penrith Cup at the Interstate Regatta. That crew finished in fourth place.

In 2009 in North Esk colours and rowing in a composite Tasmanian eight, Birtwistle won the national lightweight eight championship title at the Australian Rowing Championships.

== International representative rowing ==
Birtwistle made his Australian representative debut in a lightweight quad scull at the 2002 World Rowing Cup II in Lucerne. He then raced in that same quad that year at the World Rowing U23 Championships in Genoa to a gold medal. In 2003 he was elevated to the Australian senior lightweight squad. He competed in the lightweight quad at the 2003 World Rowing Cup III in Lucerne. Then at the 2003 World Rowing Championships in Milan he raced in the bow seat of the quad scull to a silver medal.
