= Samuel Waley =

Australian rower

Sam Waley
Personal information
- Born: 31 March 1983 (age 43)
- Years active: 1997–2004

Sport
- Country: Australia
- Sport: Rowing
- Club: Lindisfarne Rowing Club
Medal record
Men's rowing
Representing Australia
World Rowing Championships
Bronze medal – third place	2004 Banyoles	LM8-

Sam Waley (born 31 March 1983) is a Tasmanian-born Australian former representative lightweight rower. He won a bronze medal at the 2004 World Rowing Championships.

== Club and state rowing ==
Samuel Waley was educated at the Friends' School in Hobart where he was introduced to rowing. He rowed in that school's first VIII in 2001 with his future Australian lightweight crew-mate Kaspar Hebblewhite. His senior club rowing was from the Lindisfarne Rowing Club in Hobart. In 2002 he held a scholarship with the Tasmanian Institute of Sport.

He made state selection for Tasmania in the six seat of the 2001 youth eight contesting the Noel Wilkinson Trophy at the Interstate Regatta within the Australian Rowing Championships. He rowed in three consecutive Tasmanian youth eights from 2001 to 2003. In 2005 he was selected in the Tasmanian's senior men's eight contesting the King's Cup at the Interstate Regatta.

== International representative rowing ==
Waley made his Australian representative debut while still in his second-last year of high school in 2000 in an all Tasmanian men's junior quad scull which competed at the 2000 Junior World Rowing Championships in Zagreb. That quad finished in overall sixteenth place.

In 2001 he joined his Hebblewhite in another all-Tasmanian junior coxless four which competed at the 2001 Junior World Rowing Championships in Duisburg and rowed to a seventh placing. In 2003 he was selected to an U23 lightweight quad scull which raced to a seventh place at the World Rowing Cup III in Lucerne before contesting the 2003 World Rowing U23 Championships in Belgrade where they placed fourth.

In 2004 Waley stepped up to the Australian senior lightweight squad and into the lightweight eight which was crewed by five Tasmanian rowers. They rowed to a bronze medal at the 2004 World Rowing Championships in Banyoles, Spain.
