= Luca Moncada =

Italian rower

Medal record

Men's rowing

Representing Italy

World Rowing Championships
Gold medal – first place	2001 Lucerne	LM4x
Gold medal – first place	2002 Seville	LM4x
Gold medal – first place	2003 Milan	LM4x
Gold medal – first place	2005 Gifu	LM4x
Gold medal – first place	2006 Eton	LM4x
Gold medal – first place	2007 Munich	LM4x

Luca Moncada (born 3 April 1978 in Palermo) is an Italian rower.
