= Vincent Faucheux =

French rower (born 1982)

Personal information
- Born: 29 January 1982 (age 44)

Sport
- Sport: Rowing
Medal record
Men's rowing
Representing France
World Rowing Championships
Gold medal – first place	2004 Banyoles	Lwt eight
Bronze medal – third place	2003 Milan	Lwt eight

Vincent Faucheux (born 29 January 1982) is a French lightweight rower. He won a gold medal at the 2004 World Rowing Championships in Banyoles with the lightweight men's eight.
