= Jordan Smith (rower) =

American rower, rowing coach, and teacher

Jordan Smith (born August 31, 1979) is an American rower, rowing coach, and teacher.

Smith was born in 1979. He was a member of the US national rowing team, competing at the 2005 World Rowing Championships. Jordan Smith graduated from Georgia Tech. He is currently the Men’s head coach for Saint Andrew Rowing Club in Roswell, Georgia.

He used to be the head coach for the rowing team at Emory University in Atlanta, Georgia. While he is not rowing or coaching, he teaches science classes including AP Physics at Johns Creek High School and won teacher of the month at Johns Creek High School in 2016 and teacher of the year in 2018.

He is now an administrative assistant at Roswell High School, in Roswell, Georgia.
