= Kate Robinson (rower) =

New Zealand rower

Personal information
- Born: 19 January 1977 (age 49)
Medal record
Women's rowing
Representing New Zealand
World Rowing Championships
Silver medal – second place	2001 Lucerne	W4-

Kate Robinson (born 19 January 1977) is a New Zealand rower.

Robinson was born in 1977. Her parents are Isabel and Rob Robinson, and she has one sibling. Her father was the New Zealand Police Commissioner from 2000 to 2005.

In 2001, she won silver at the World Championships in Lucerne, Switzerland as bow in the four with team mates Jackie Abraham-Lawrie (bow), Rochelle Saunders (3), and Nicky Coles (stroke).
