= Jackie Abraham-Lawrie =

New Zealand rower

Personal information
- Born: 22 June 1974 (age 52)
- Education: Wanganui Girls' College
Medal record
Women's rowing
Representing New Zealand
World Rowing Championships
Silver medal – second place	2001 Lucerne	W4-

Jackie Abraham-Lawrie (born 22 June 1974) is a New Zealand rower.

She received her secondary education at Wanganui Girls' College (1987–1990). In 2001, she won silver at the World Championships in Lucerne, Switzerland as bow in the four with teammates Kate Robinson (2), Rochelle Saunders (3), and Nicky Coles (stroke).
