= Lorna Norris =

British rower (born 1975)

Personal information
- Nationality: British
- Born: 23 December 1975 (age 50)
Medal record
Women's rowing
Representing Great Britain
World Championships
| Bronze medal – third place | 2005 Gifu | LW4x |

Lorna Norris (born 23 December 1975) is a former British rower.

She was part of the British squad which competed in the 2005 World Rowing Championships, and won a bronze medal.
