= Rochelle Saunders =

New Zealand rower

Personal information
- Born: 21 May 1975 (age 51)
Medal record
Women's rowing
Representing New Zealand
World Rowing Championships
Silver medal – second place	2001 Lucerne	W4-

Rochelle Saunders (born 21 May 1975) is a New Zealand rower.

In 2001, she won silver at the World Championships in Lucerne, Switzerland as bow in the four with teammates Jackie Abraham-Lawrie (bow), Kate Robinson (2), and Nicky Coles (stroke).
