= Peter Dembicki =

Canadian rower (born 1980)

Medal record

Men's rowing

Representing Canada

World Rowing Championships
Silver medal – second place	2004 Banyoles	M4+
Bronze medal – third place	2005 Gifu	M4-

Peter Dembicki (born 24 September 1980 in Vancouver) is a Canadian rower.
