= Gardino Pellolio =

Italian rower

Medal record

Men's rowing

Representing Italy

World Rowing Championships
Gold medal – first place	2005 Gifu	LM4x
Gold medal – first place	2006 Eton	LM4x

Gardino Pellolio (born 11 June 1980 in Como) is an Italian rower.
