= Tom Nicholls (rower) =

Australian rower (born 1983)

Personal information
- Born: 24 September 1983 (age 42)

Sport
- Country: Australia
- Sport: Rowing
- Club: Swan River Rowing Club
Medal record
Men's rowing
Representing Australia
World Rowing Championships
| Bronze medal – third place | 2004 Banyoles | LM8- |
World Rowing U23 Championships
| Gold medal – first place | 2003 Belgrade | BLM4- |
| Silver medal – second place | 2002 Genoa | BLM2- |

Tom Nicholls (born 24 September 1983) is a West Australian former representative lightweight rower. He was an Australian national champion, an U23 world champion and won a bronze medal at the 2004 World Rowing Championships.

== Club and state rowing ==
Nicholls was raised in Perth. His senior club rowing was from the Perth's Swan River Rowing Club.

He first made state selection for Western Australia in 2002 in the men's lightweight coxless four which contested the Penrith Cup at the Interstate Regatta within the Australian Rowing Championships. That 2002 West Australian four with Nicholls in the bow seat dead-heated for first place with Tasmanian. He rowed in further West Australian Penrith Cup fours in 2003 and 2004.

== International representative rowing ==
Nicholls made his Australian representative debut in 2002 at the World Rowing Cup II in Lucerne in a lightweight coxless pair with his West Australian team-mate Ross Brown. They rowed to sixth place. They went on to the 2002 World Rowing U23 Championships in Genoa where they won a silver medal in the coxless pair.

In 2003 Nicholls and Brown teamed up with the Tasmanians Tom Gibson and Cameron Wurf in a lightweight coxless four. They finished in overall twelfth place at the World Rowing Cup III in Lucerne but then at the 2003 World Rowing U23 Championships in Belgrade they took the gold medal and claimed an U23 World Championship.

In 2004 he moved fully into the Australian senior squad in the lightweight eight. That boat rowed to bronze medal at the 2004 World Rowing Championships in Banyoles, Spain.
