= Filippo Mannucci =

Italian rower (born 1974)

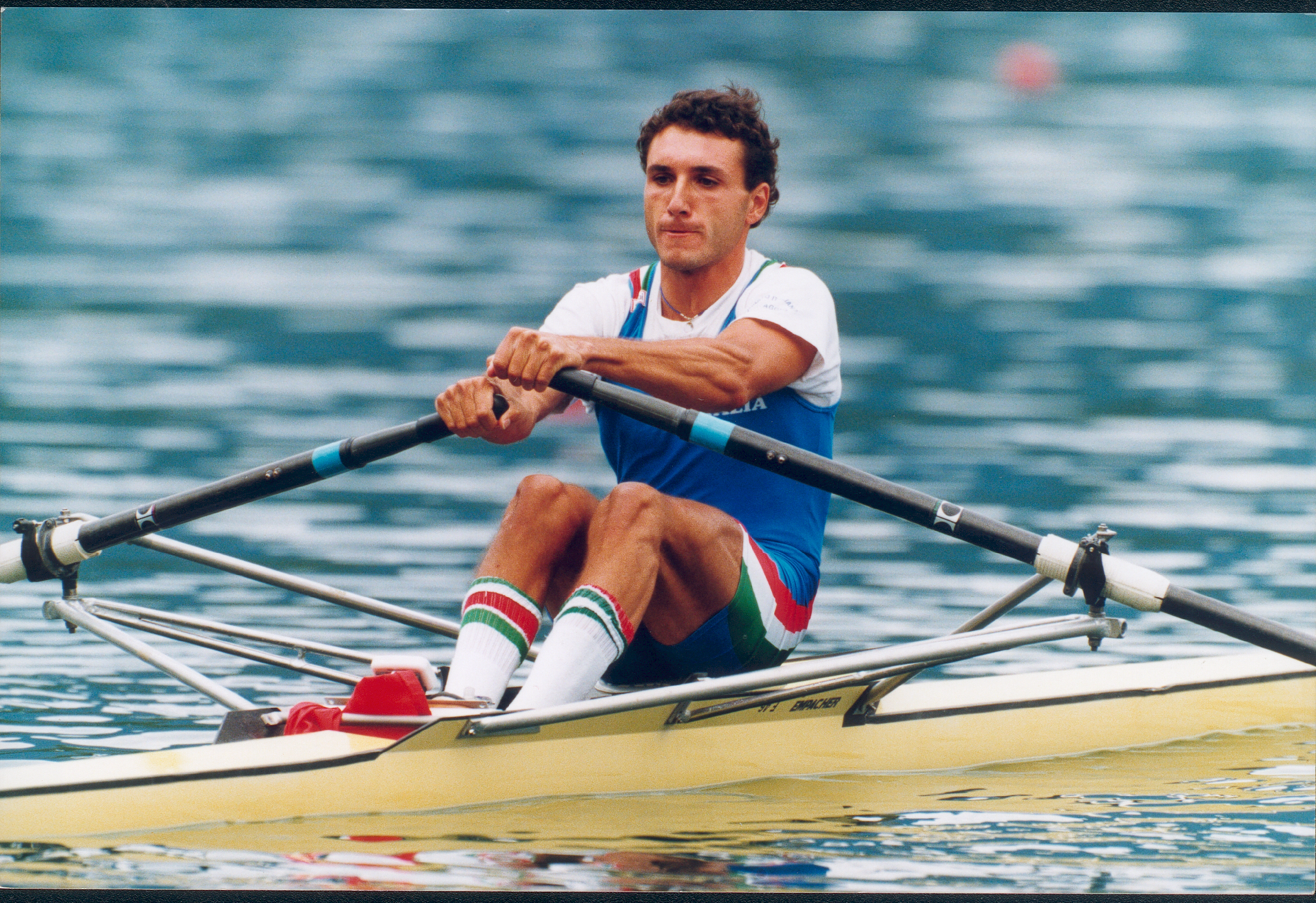
- Mannucci in single scull

Medal record

Men's rowing

Representing Italy

World Rowing Championships
Gold medal – first place	2001 Lucerne	LM4x
Gold medal – first place	2002 Seville	LM4x
Gold medal – first place	2003 Milan	LM4x
Gold medal – first place	2005 Gifu	LM4x

Filippo Mannucci (born 20 July 1974 in Livorno) is an Italian rower.

Filippo Mannucci started rowing at the age of 13 in C.C.Solvay club; he started the competition the following year with good results. The first success in national competition was in 1992 in junior 1x.
