= Marc Douez =

Australian rowing cox

Marc Henri Douez
Personal information
- Born: 20 September 1981 (age 44)
- Years active: 1996–2010

Sport
- Sport: Rowing
- Club: Melbourne Uni Boat Club
Medal record
Men's rowing
Representing Australia
World Championships
Gold medal – first place	2005 Gifu	M2+
Silver medal – second place	2003 Milan	M2+
Bronze medal – third place	2004 Banyoles	LM8+

Marc Douez (born 20 September 1981 in Victoria ) is an Australian former national champion and world champion rowing coxswain.

== Club and state rowing ==
Douez' senior coxing was done from the Melbourne University Boat Club.

He was first selected to represent Victoria in the men's youth eight who contested the Noel F Wilkinson Trophy in the Interstate Regatta within the 2001 Australian Rowing Championships. On seven occasions between 2003 and 2010 he coxed the Victorian senior men's eight contesting the King's Cup at the Australian Interstate Regatta. He steered those eights to victory in 2003, 2006 and 2007.

In Melbourne University colours Douex contested national titles at the Australian Rowing Championships. In 2005 and 2007 he coxed MUBC crews racing for the Australian men's coxed four national championships.

== International representative rowing ==
Douez was first selected to represent Australia in the men's eight which contested the 2002 World Rowing U23 Championships in Genoa and achieved a fourth placing.

Douez made his first appearance in senior Australian representative crews in 2003. He steered the men's eight to a silver medal at the World Rowing Cup III in Lucerne and then at the 2003 World Rowing Championships in Milan to the final and a fifth placing. At those 2003 championships he was also up front in the Australian men's coxed pair of Luke Pougnault and Jonathan Fievez both from Western Australia when they rowed to a silver medal. 2004 saw Douez selected to cox the Australian senior lightweight eight and he called their racing campaign to a bronze medal at the 2004 World Rowing Championships in Banyoles.

In 2005 Douez was selected to steer the Australian coxed pair at the 2005 World Rowing Championships in Gifu, Japan with Hardy Cubasch at bow and Sam Conrad stroking. The pair led the race from start to finish and claimed Australia's second ever World Championship title in that boat class.

Coming into the 2008 Olympic campaign, Douez was vying for the coxswain's seat in the Australian men's senior eight. In selection trials he was beaten out by his New South Wales opponent Marty Rabjohns.
