= Jérémy Pouge =

French rower

Medal record

Men's rowing

Representing France

World Rowing Championships
Gold medal – first place	2004 Banyoles	LM8+
Gold medal – first place	2005 Gifu	LM4-
Silver medal – second place	2006 Eton	LM4-
Silver medal – second place	2007 Munich	LM4-

Jérémy Pouge (born 3 May 1980 in Tournon-sur-Rhône) is a French rower.
