= Joachim Drews =

German rower

Personal information
- Born: 30 June 1980 (age 45)

Sport
- Sport: Rowing
Medal record
Men's rowing
Representing Germany
World Rowing Championships
Gold medal – first place	2003 Milan	Lwt eight
Silver medal – second place	2002 Seville	Lwt eight

Joachim Drews (born 30 June 1980) is a German lightweight rower. He won a gold medal at the 2003 World Rowing Championships in Milan with the lightweight men's eight.
