= Jonathan Fievez =

Australian rower

Personal information
- Born: 25 April 1978 (age 48)
- Years active: 1991–2003

Sport
- Sport: Rowing

Achievements and titles
- National finals: King's Cup 1998, 1999, 2000, 2003
Medal record
Men's rowing
Representing Australia
World Rowing Championships
Silver medal – second place	2003 Milan	M2+

Jonathan Fievez (born 25 April 1978 in Perth, Western Australia) is an Australian former rower. He was a junior world champion, national champion and was a medalist at World Rowing Championships.

== State and club rowing ==
Fievez first made state selection for Western Australia in the 1995 youth eight contesting the Noel Wilkinson Trophy at the Australian Rowing Championships. He rowed in the West Australian youth eight again in 1996, stroking that eight which also included his brother Anthony to a second place. In 1998 he was selected in the Western Australia senior eight contesting the King's Cup at the Interstate Regatta. He was in the 1999 West Australian eight which won the King's Cup in 1999 and then he rowed in further King's Cup crews in 2000 and 2003.

== International representative rowing ==
Fievez made his Australian representative debut aged seventeen as a sculler selected to race in an U23 quad scull at the 1995 World Rowing U23 Championships in Groningen. They finished in overall seventh place. That same year the same quad competed at the 1995 Junior World Rowing Championships in Poznan. The whole Australian squad were thrown into disarray by a severe bout of food poisoning suffered at the regatta accommodation. The quad raced anyway and placed seventh overall.

In 1996 Fievez was picked in the Australian double scull at the 1996 Junior World Rowing Championships in Glasgow. Racing in the final with Timothy Perkins, they were fifth at the 500m mark, took the lead by the 1000m and held off a fast finish from the Yugoslavs to win by 0.18 secs and take the gold.

In 1999 Fievez was selected in the Australian senior squad and with Matthew O'Callaghan, he raced a double scull at the 1999 World Rowing Championships in St Catharines Canada. They finished overall seventeenth. By 2003 Fievez had switched to sweep-oared boats and was back in representative contention. With his West Australian team-mate Luke Pougnault he contested the coxless pair at the World Rowing Cup III in Lucerne and then at the 2003 World Rowing Championships they raced as a coxed pair with Marc Douez up front. They won a silver World Championship medal.

== Surfboats ==
In stillwater retirement Fievez took up surfboat rowing and surf ski racing. He was in a North Cottesloe Beach SLSC boat with David Porzig (another Australian representative stillwater rower) which won the open men's surfboat category at the World Surflifesaving Championships in Victoria in 2006. As of 2014 Fievez was still competing in master's events in single surf skis.
