= Deng Yanping =

Chinese rower

Deng Yanping (born 2 June 1987) is a Chinese lightweight rower.

At the 2003 World Rowing Championships in Milan, Italy, she won a gold medal in the lightweight women's quadruple sculls. At the next world championships in 2004 in Banyoles in Catalonia, Spain, she defended her world championship title in that boat class.
