= Peter Ording =

German rower (born 1976)

Medal record

Men's rowing

Representing Germany

World Rowing Championships
Gold medal – first place	2004 Banyoles	LM1x
Bronze medal – third place	2003 Milan	LM1x

Peter Ording (born 22 December 1976 in Stade) is a German rower.
