= Celia Foulon =

French rower (born 1979)

Personal information
- Nationality: French
- Born: 14 April 1979 (age 47)

Sport
- Country: France
- Sport: Rowing
Medal record
Representing France
World Championships
Gold medal – first place	2004 Catalonia	W4-

Celia Foulon (born 14 April 1979) is a French rower. She won a gold medal at the 2004 World Rowing Championships on the Lake of Banyoles in Catalonia, Spain, in the women's four event.
