= Tanya Brady =

British rower (1973–2022)

Personal information
- Nationality: British
- Born: 24 January 1973
- Died: 28 April 2022 (aged 49)
Medal record
Women's rowing
Representing Great Britain
World Championships
Bronze medal – third place	2005 Gifu	LW4x

Tanya Helen Brady (24 January 1973 – 28 April 2022) was a British rower and Army captain.

== Army career ==
Brady rowed for the British Army when she served with the Royal Logistic Corps. As a soldier, she served in Bosnia.

== Rowing career ==
She was part of the British squad which competed in the 2005 World Rowing Championships, and won a bronze medal.

== Death ==
Brady died at Liss, Hampshire in April 2022. An inquest at Winchester Crown Court in January 2023 found that she was killed after being thrown from her horse which bolted.
