= Philipp Stüer =

German rower (born 1976)

Medal record

Men's rowing

Representing Germany

World Rowing Championships
Gold medal – first place	2002 Seville	M4-
Gold medal – first place	2006 Eton	M8+
Silver medal – second place	2001 Lucerne	M4-
Silver medal – second place	2007 Munich	M8+
Bronze medal – third place	2003 Milan	M4-

Philipp Stüer (born 20 October 1976, in Münster) is a German rower.

== Achievements ==
- 1997: 1st Place Eight (Nations Cup)
- 1998: 8th Place Coxless Four (World Rowing Championships)
- 1999: 7th Place Coxless Four (World Rowing Championships)
- 2000: Reserve for the Olympic Games
- 2001: 2nd Place Coxless Four (World Rowing Championships)
- 2002: 1st Place Coxless Four (World Rowing Championships)
- 2003: 3rd Place Coxless Four (World Rowing Championships)
- 2004: 7th Place Coxless Four (Olympic Games)
- 2006: 1st Place Eight (World Rowing Championships)
- 2007: 2nd Place Eight (World Rowing Championships)
