= Wang Yanni =

Chinese rower

Wang Yanni (born 23 October 1982) is a Chinese lightweight rower.

At the 2000 World Rowing Championships in Zagreb, Croatia, she won bronze in the lightweight women's quad sculls. At the 2003 World Rowing U23 Championships in Belgrade, Serbia, she won a gold medal in the lightweight women's double sculls partnered with Zhou Weijuan. At the 2004 World Rowing Championships in Banyoles in Catalonia, Spain, she won a gold medal in the lightweight women's quadruple sculls.
