= Franck Bussière =

French rower

Personal information
- Born: 13 August 1975 (age 50)

Sport
- Sport: Rowing
Medal record
Men's rowing
Representing France
World Rowing Championships
Gold medal – first place	2001 Lucerne	Lwt eight
Gold medal – first place	2004 Banyoles	Lwt eight
Bronze medal – third place	2003 Milan	Lwt eight

Franck Bussière (born 13 August 1975) is a French lightweight rower. He won a gold medal at the 2001 World Rowing Championships in Lucerne with the lightweight men's eight.
