= Elpida Grigoriadou =

Greek rower (born 1971)

Elpida Grigoriadou (born 24 August 1971, in Thessaloniki) is a Greek rower. She competed in the 2003 World Rowing Championships winning a bronze medal in the lightweight women's double sculls alongside Angeliki Gkremou.
