= Zhou Weijuan =

Chinese rower

Zhou Weijuan (born 3 January 1986) is a Chinese lightweight rower.

At the 2003 World Rowing U23 Championships in Belgrade, Serbia, she won a gold medal in the lightweight women's double sculls partnered with Wang Yanni. Five weeks later at the 2003 World Rowing Championships in Milan, Italy, she won a gold medal in the lightweight women's quadruple sculls. At the next world championships in 2004 in Banyoles in Catalonia, Spain, she defended her world championship title in that boat class.
