= Jan Tebrügge =

German rower (born 1982)

Medal record

Men's rowing

Representing Germany

World Rowing Championships
Gold medal – first place	2006 Eton	M8+
Silver medal – second place	2007 Munich	M8+
Bronze medal – third place	2005 Gifu	M8+

Jan Tebrügge (born 14 December 1982 in Münster) is a German rower.
