= Emanuele Federici =

Italian lightweight rower

Personal information
- Born: 17 August 1978 (age 47)

Sport
- Sport: Rowing
Medal record
Men's rowing
Representing Italy
World Rowing Championships
Gold medal – first place	2002 Seville	Lwt quad scull
Gold medal – first place	2003 Milan	Lwt quad scull
Silver medal – second place	2004 Banyoles	Lwt eight

Emanuele Federici (born 17 August 1978) is an Italian lightweight rower. He won a gold medal at the 2002 World Rowing Championships in Seville with the lightweight men's quadruple scull.
