= Bruno Pasqualini =

Italian rower

Personal information
- Born: 30 October 1973 (age 52)

Sport
- Sport: Rowing
Medal record
Men's rowing
Representing Italy
World Championships
Gold medal – first place	2002 Seville	Lwt eight
Silver medal – second place	2004 Banyoles	Lwt eight
Bronze medal – third place	1999 St. Catharines	Lwt eight

Bruno Pasqualini (born 30 October 1973) is an Italian lightweight rower. He won a gold medal at the 2002 World Rowing Championships in Seville with the lightweight men's eight.
