= Carly Bilson =

Australian rowing cox

Personal information
- Born: 18 February 1981 (age 45)

Sport
- Sport: Rowing
- Club: Mosman Rowing Club
Medal record
Women's rowing
Representing Australia
World Rowing Championships
Gold medal – first place	2001 Lucerne	Eight
Silver medal – second place	2002 Seville	Eight

Carly Bilson (born 18 February 1981) is an Australian former rowing coxswain – a national champion and World Champion. She is Australia's first female World Champion coxswain, having steered the 2001 World Championship women's eight to victory.

== Club and state rowing ==
Born in Sydney, Bilson's senior rowing was done from the Mosman Rowing Club. She was awarded a scholarship to the New South Wales Institute of Sport prior to her 2001 World Championship success.

Bilson was coxing at Mosman when the Australian premier women's interstate event was upgraded from a coxless four to an eight. Initially the women's eights continued to contest the longstanding silverware – the ULVA Trophy. Bilson was selected in the stern of the first four New South Wales eights who contested the blue riband event in the Interstate Regatta within the Australian Rowing Championships from 1999 to 2002. She saw a New South Wales victory in 2002. In her first state representative year of 1999 she coxed both the senior and the youth New South Wales women's eights and had a victory in the youth eight.

== International representative rowing ==
Bilson made the Australian squad for the 2001 international tour. In their first competitive outing of the 2001 season, racing as an Australian Institute of Sport selection eight at Henley Royal Regatta, Bilson won the 2001 Henley Prize for women's eights (from 2002 this event was renamed the Remenham Challenge Cup). She then coxed the eight in the World Rowing Cup IV regatta in Munich Germany. The Australian eight placed second and knew they were on track for possible World Championship success. A month later at the 2001 World Rowing Championships in Lucerne, Switzerland the Australian women's heavyweight crew stroked by Kristina Larsen won Australia's first ever women's eight World Championship title. Bilson came home as the first female coxswain to steer an Australian boat to a world title and the first to cox an Australian women's eight to victory at Henley.

With just one seat change the Australian women's eight stayed together into 2002. Their European campaign ahead of the World Championships saw Bilson steering the eight to a bronze at the Rowing World Cup II in Lucerne and to silver at the Rowing World Cup III in Munich. At the 2002 World Championships in Seville Spain, the Australian eight won their heat but were beaten out by the USA by 0.45 seconds in the final. The Australians with Bilson in the stern just held out the Germans and Bilson won her second World Championship placing – a silver.
