= Alexis Saïtta =

French rower (born 1980)

Personal information
- Born: 29 June 1980 (age 45)

Sport
- Sport: Rowing
Medal record
Men's rowing
Representing France
World Rowing Championships
Gold medal – first place	2004 Banyoles	Lwt eight
Bronze medal – third place	2003 Milan	Lwt eight

Alexis Saïtta (born 29 June 1980) is a French lightweight rower. He won a gold medal at the 2004 World Rowing Championships in Banyoles with the lightweight men's eight.
