= David Calder (rower) =

Canadian rower (born 1978)

David Calder OLY
Personal information
- Born: May 21, 1978 (age 48) Brandon, Manitoba, Canada
Medal record
Men's rowing
Representing Canada
Olympic Games
Silver medal – second place	2008 Beijing	Coxless pair
World Rowing Championships
Gold medal – first place	2003 Milan	Eight

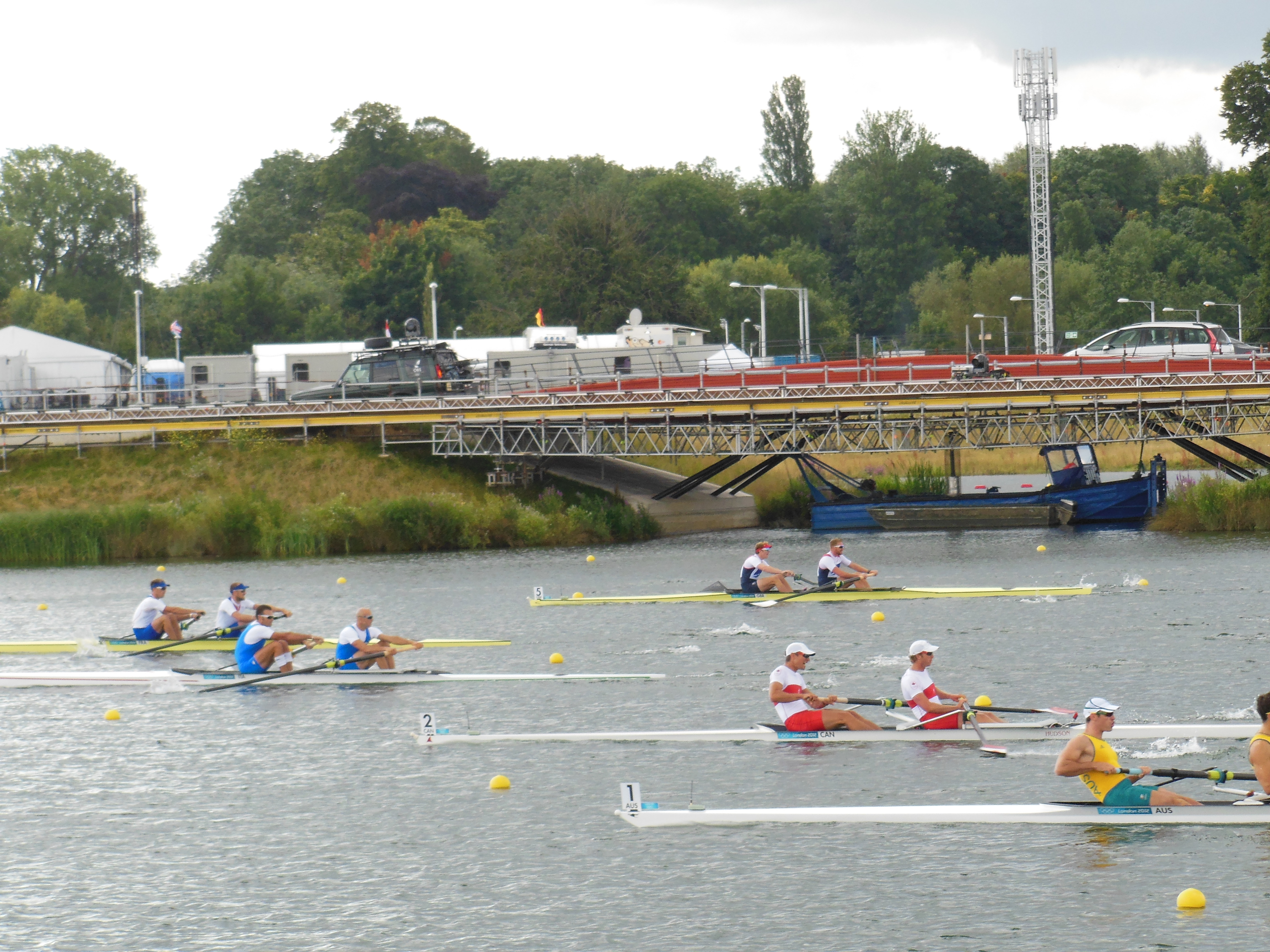
Rowing the final (in red/white) of the men's coxless pair at the 2012 Summer Olympics.

David C D Calder (born May 21, 1978) is a Canadian rower. A four-time Olympian, he is a 2008 Olympics silver medallist in the men's coxless pair rowing event along with Scott Frandsen.

== Biography ==
Born in Brandon, Manitoba, he attended Brentwood College School in Mill Bay, British Columbia. He participated in three consecutive World Rowing Junior Championships, winning bronze at the 1994 men's four event, and winning gold at the 1996 men's pair event. He set the British Columbia 2000 metre ergometer record at the Junior A (Under-19) level with a time of 5:59.9 in 1996, and graduated from Brentwood the same year.

He made his Olympics debut at the 2000 Sydney games, finishing seventh in the men's eight finals. He was part of the crew that won gold in the men’s 8+ event at the 2003 World Rowing Championships. He then rowed with Chris Jarvis in the men's coxless pair event at the 2004 Athens games, but they were disqualified in the semi-final for departing from their lane in the final metres of the race. The pair appealed the decision to no avail, and did not race in the finals.

Coached by Terry Paul, he won the silver medal in the men's coxless pair event at the 2008 Beijing games along with Scott Frandsen. They were the first Canadians to win a medal at those games. He made his final Olympic appearance at the 2012 London games, finishing sixth in the men's coxless pair event alongside Frandsen.

In between Olympics, Calder worked as a community relations adviser for the British Columbia Ministry of Energy, Mines and Natural Gas. He then went on to manage the St. Michaels University School Community Rowing Centre, as well as the Gorge Narrows Rowing Club. He joined the board of directors of Rowing British Columbia in 2016, before becoming the organization's executive director in November 2017. He was inducted into the Greater Victoria Sports Hall of Fame in 2018.

During the 2013 provincial election, Calder campaigned for British Columbia New Democratic Party candidate Lana Popham, the incumbent Member of the Legislative Assembly for the riding of Saanich South. He then briefly served on her constituency association's executive before joining the British Columbia Liberal Party in November 2016. He contested the Saanich South seat in the 2017 provincial election as a Liberal candidate, finishing second to Popham.

== Electoral record ==
2017 British Columbia general election: Saanich South
Party	Candidate	Votes	%	±%	Expenditures
New Democratic	Lana Popham	11,921	42.47	−3.08	$59,661
Liberal	David Calder	8,716	31.05	−4.24	$66,005
Green	Mark Neufeld	7,129	25.39	+10.10	$15,073
Libertarian	Andrew Paul McLean	177	0.63	–	$0
Vancouver Island Party	Richard Percival Pattee	130	0.46	–	$1,570
Total valid votes		28,073	100.00	–	
Total rejected ballots		126	0.45	+0.12	
Turnout		28,199	70.63	+3.52	
Registered voters		30,926			
Source: Elections BC
