= Nina Gäßler =

German rower and cyclist

Medal record

Women's rowing

Representing Germany

World Rowing Championships
Gold medal – first place	2004 Banyoles	LW1x

Nina Gäßler (born 10 January 1975 in Ulm) is a German mountain biker and rower.

In 2005, she moved to Norway, settling in Geilo and worked as a rafting guide. She started mountain bike races in 2006. And has now a successful mountain bike enterprise.
