= 2004 World Rowing Championships =

International rowing event

- Venue: Lake of Banyoles
- Location: Catalonia, Spain
- Dates: 27 July to 1 August

The 2004 World Rowing Championships were World Rowing Championships that were held from 27 July to 1 August 2004 in conjunction with the World Junior Rowing Championships on lake Banyoles in Catalonia, Spain. Since 2004 was an Olympic year for rowing, the World Championships did not include Olympic events scheduled for the 2004 Summer Olympics.

== Medal summary ==
=== Men's events ===
Non-Olympic classes

Event	Gold	Time	Silver	Time	Bronze	Time
M4+	Italy; Lorenzo Carboncini (b); Stefano Introzzi (2); Edoardo Verzotti (3); Valerio Massimo (s); Alessandro Speranza (c)	6:11.53	Canada; Robert Weitemeyer (b); Malcolm Howard (2); Peter Dembicki (3); Andrew Ireland (s); Stephen Cheng (c)	06:11.55	United States; Andrew Brennan (b); Paul Daniels (2); Steve Coppola (3); Josh Inman (s); Marcus McElhenney (c)	6:11.97
M2+	Italy; Mattia Trombetta (b); Mario Palmisano (s); Luigi Longobardi (c)	6:54.46	Poland; Marcin Wika (b); Piotr Basta (s); Rafał Cholewiński (c)	6:55.63	Denmark; Gunnar Levring (b); Morten Nielsen (s); Jacob Neergaard (c)	6:56.12
Men's lightweight events
LM1x	Germany; Peter Ording	7:03.04	Switzerland; Stephan Steiner	7:18.53	Ukraine; Oleksandr Serdiuk	7:05.93
LM4x	Italy; Franco Sancassani (b); Alessandro Lodigiani (2); Daniele Gilardoni (3); Marcello Miani (s)	5:58.38	Canada; Jeff Bujas (b); Scott Moore (2); Matt Jensen (3); Liam Parsons (s)	5:58.57	Germany; Nils Budde (b); Matthias Schömann-Finck (2); Nils Ipsen (3); Jens Wittwer (s)	6:01.43
LM2-	Denmark; Bo Helleberg (b); Mads Andersen	6:40.29	Italy; Nicola Moriconi (b); Salvatore Di Somma	6:40.59	Canada; Douglas Vandor (b); Mike Lewis (s)	6:44.03
LM8+	France; Franck Solforosi (b); Damien Margat (2); Alexis Saïtta (3); Jérémy Pouge (4); Franck Bussière (5); Vincent Faucheux (6); Nicolas Planque (7); Fabien Tilliet (s); Nicolas Majerus (c)	5:42.49	Italy; Santino Faggioli (b); Luigi Scala (2); Bruno Pasqualini (3); Giuseppe Del Gaudio (4); Fabrizio Gabriele (5); Stefano De Piccoli (6); Livio La Padula (7); Emanuele Federici (s); Gianluca Barattolo (c)	5:43.88	Australia; George Roberts (b); Samuel Waley (2); Ross Brown (3); Kaspar Hebblewhite (4); Thomas Gibson (5); Tom Nicholls (6); Tim Smith (7); Samuel Beltz (s); Marc Douez (c)	5:46.64

=== Women's events ===
Non-Olympic classes

Event	Gold	Time	Silver	Time	Bronze	Time
W4-	France; Marjolaine Rossit (b); Celia Foulon (2); Audrey Galy (3); Marie Le Nepvou (s)	6:36.28	Russia; Valeriya Starodubrovskaya (b); Yulia Inozemtseva (2); Natalia Melnikova (3); Vera Pochitaeva (s)	6:38.00	Belarus; Iryna Bazyleuskaya (b); Natallia Lialina (2); Tamara Samakhvalava (3); Hanna Nakhayeva (s)	6:38.07
Women's lightweight events
LW1x	Germany; Nina Gäßler	7:38.51	Great Britain; Jo Hammond	7:40.22	Finland; Minna Nieminen	7:40.27
LW4x	China; Wang Yanni (b); Deng Yanping (2); Tan Meiyun (3); Zhou Weijuan (s)	6:36.78	Canada; Gen Meredith (b); Sheryl Preston (2); Shona Mclaren (3); Elizabeth Urbach (s)	6:40.86	United States; Maria Picone (b); Mary Obidinski (2); Julie Nichols (3); Renee Hykel (s)	6:42.56

=== Adaptive rowing ===
Three boat classes competed at the adaptive rowing event held from 29 July to 1 August: AS men's single sculls (ASM1x), LTA mixed coxed four (LTAMix4+), and TA mixed double sculls (TAMix2x).

Event	Gold	Time	Silver	Time	Bronze	Time
ASM1x; AS men's single sculls	Australia; Peter Taylor	2:58.20	Great Britain; Rob Holliday	3:11.33	United States; Ronald Harvey	3:11.68
LTAMix4+ LTA mixed coxed four	Great Britain; Katie-George Dunlevy (b); Naomi Riches (2); Paul Askam-Spencer (3); Alan Crowther (s); Loretta Williams (cox)	3:39.21	Netherlands; Catharina Bijl (b); Joleen Hakker (2); Paul De Jong (3); Martin Lauriks (s); Helen Op Den Velde-Berger (cox)	3:47.03	Portugal; Monica Campizes Ferreira (b); José Pereira (2); Bruno Indio (3); Sonia Costa (s); Isabel Jesus (cox)	3:52.76
TAMix2x; TA mixed double sculls	United States; Scott Brown (b); Angela Madsen (s)	4:33.90	France; Michele Amiel (b); Christophe Somme (s)	6:27.25	Italy; Enio Billiato (b); Agnese Moro (s)	6:50.14

== Medal table ==
Place	Nation	1st place, gold medalist(s)	2nd place, silver medalist(s)	3rd place, bronze medalist(s)	Total
1	Italy	3	2	0	5
2	Germany	2	0	1	3
3	France	2	0	0	2
4	Denmark	1	0	1	2
5	China	1	0	0	1
6	Canada	0	3	1	4
7	Great Britain	0	1	0	1
7	Russia	0	1	0	1
7	Switzerland	0	1	0	1
7	Poland	0	1	0	1
11	United States	0	0	2	2
12	Finland	0	0	1	1
12	Belarus	0	0	1	1
12	Ukraine	0	0	1	1
12	Australia	0	0	1	1
Total		9	9	9	27
