= Nicolas Majerus =

French rower

Personal information
- Born: 15 November 1982 (age 43)

Sport
- Sport: Rowing
Medal record
Men's rowing
Representing France
World Championships
Gold medal – first place	2004 Banyoles	Lwt eight
Gold medal – first place	2005 Kaizu, Gifu	Coxed four
Bronze medal – third place	2003 Milan	Lwt eight

Nicolas Majerus (born 15 November 1982) is a French coxswain. He won a gold medal at the 2004 World Rowing Championships in Banyoles with the lightweight men's eight.
