= Thomas Larsen (rower, born 1980) =

Danish rower

Personal information
- Nationality: Danish
- Born: 1 June 1980 (age 44); Copenhagen, Denmark

Sport
- Sport: Rowing

Thomas Larsen (born 1 June 1980) is a Danish rower. He competed in the men's coxless pair event at the 2008 Summer Olympics.
