= 2003 World Rowing Championships =

International rowing event

- Venue: Idroscalo
- Location: Milan, Italy
- Dates: 25 August to 1 September

The 2003 World Rowing Championships were World Rowing Championships that were held from 25 August to 1 September 2003 on the lake Idroscalo at Milan, Italy. The international rowing season usually ends with the World Championship regatta. Apart from the Olympic Games this is the most prestigious international rowing event, attracting over 1000 rowers.

== Medal summary ==
=== Men's events ===
Non-Olympic classes

Event:	Gold:	Time	Silver:	Time	Bronze:	Time
M1x	Norway; Olaf Tufte	6:46.15	Germany; Marcel Hacker	6:47.47	Slovenia; Iztok Čop	6:48.31
M2x	France; Sébastien Vieilledent; Adrien Hardy	6:13.93	Italy; Rossano Galtarossa; Alessio Sartori	6:15.65	Czech Republic; Milan Doleček; Ondřej Synek	6:16.59
M4x	Germany; André Willms; Stephan Volkert; Marco Geisler; Robert Sens	6:12.26	Czech Republic; David Kopřiva; Petr Vitásek; Jakub Hanák; David Jirka	6:15.59	Poland; Adam Bronikowski; Marek Kolbowicz; Sławomir Kruszkowski; Adam Korol	6:18.80
M2-	Australia; Drew Ginn; James Tomkins	6:19.31	Croatia; Siniša Skelin; Nikša Skelin	6:20.79	South Africa; Ramon di Clemente; Donovan Cech	6:21.69
M4-	Canada; Cameron Baerg; Thomas Herschmiller; Jake Wetzel; Barney Williams	5:52.91	Great Britain; Steve Williams; Josh West; Toby Garbett; Rick Dunn	5:53.54	Germany; Sebastian Thormann; Paul Dienstbach; Philipp Stüer; Bernd Heidicker	5:55.13
M2+	United States; Matt Rich; Dan Beery; Andrew Kelly	7:10.11	Australia; Luke Pougnault; Jonathan Fievez; Marc Douez	7:13.13	Canada; Kevin Burt; Geoff Hodgson; Brian Price	7:20.23
M4+	United States; Brian McDonough; Matt Deakin; Jason Flickinger; Lucas McGee; Marcus McElhenney	6:04.68	Great Britain; James Livingston; Richard Egington; Kieran West; Tom Stallard; Peter Rudge	6:05.82	Germany; Arne Landgraf; Matthias Flach; Jan-Martin Bröer; Klaus Rogge; Stefan Lier	6:08.90
M8+	Canada; Joe Stankevicius; Kevin Light; Ben Rutledge; Kyle Hamilton; David Calder; Andrew Hoskins; Adam Kreek; Jeff Powell; Brian Price	6:00.44	USA; Ryan Torgerson; Jonathan Watling; Michael Wherley; Wolfgang Moser; Bryan Volpenhein; Jeffrey Klepacki; Joseph Hansen; Jason Read; Peter Cipollone	6:01.46	Great Britain; Alex Partridge; Dan Ouseley; Jonno Devlin; Andrew Triggs Hodge; Josh West; Ed Coode; Robin Bourne-Taylor; Tom James; Christian Cormack	6:03.45
Men's lightweight events
LM1x	Italy; Stefano Basalini	6:59.65	Great Britain; Tom Kay	7:02.12	Germany; Peter Ording	7:05.36
LM2x	Italy; Elia Luini; Leonardo Pettinari	6:30.60	Poland; Tomasz Kucharski; Robert Sycz	6:33.12	Ireland; Sam Lynch; Gearoid Towey	6:35.90
LM4x	Italy; Emanuele Federici; Daniele Gilardoni; Luca Moncada; Filippo Mannucci	6:07.10	Australia; Deon Birtwistle; Michael McBryde; Shane Broad; Samuel Beltz	6:09.36	Germany; Jörg Lehnigk; Matthias Schömann-Finck; Nils Ipsen; Jens Wittwer	6:10.88
LM2-	Denmark; Bo Helleberg; Mads Andersen	6:35.73	Germany; Frank Mager; Christian Gerlach	6:37.36	United States; Simon Carcagno; Mike Altman	6:41.05
LM4-	Denmark; Thor Kristensen; Thomas Ebert; Stephan Mølvig; Eskild Ebbesen	6:10.46	Netherlands; Gerard van der Linden; Ivo Snijders; Karel Dormans; Joeri de Groot	6:12.24	Italy; Lorenzo Bertini; Catello Amarante; Salvatore Amitrano; Bruno Mascarenhas	6:13.04
LM8+	Germany; Bastian Seibt; Martin Raeder; Joachim Drews; Martin Hasse; Carsten Borchardt; Birger Schmidt; Matthias Hobein; Christian Dahlke; Olaf Kaska	5:41.43	United States; Tom Paradiso; Eric Feins; Pat Todd (rower); Andrew Bolton; William Fedyna; John Wall; Angus Maclaurin; John Wachter III; Joseph Finelli	5:43.95	France; Vincent Faucheux; Fabien Dagada; Rémi Le Flohic; Damien Margat; Alexis Saïtta; Franck Bussière; Nicolas Planque; Jérôme Bandiera; Nicolas Majerus	6:03.45

=== Women's events ===
Non-Olympic classes

Event:	Gold:	Time	Silver:	Time	Bronze:	Time
W1x	Bulgaria; Rumyana Neykova	7:18.12	Germany; Katrin Rutschow-Stomporowski	7:21.44	Belarus; Ekaterina Karsten-Khodotovitch	7:.23.30
W2x	New Zealand; Georgina Evers-Swindell; Caroline Evers-Swindell	6:45.79	Germany; Britta Oppelt; Kathrin Boron	6:47.57	Russia; Larisa Merk; Irina Fedotova	6:49.50
W4x	Australia; Jane Robinson; Dana Faletic; Kerry Hore; Amber Bradley	6:46.52	Belarus; Ekaterina Karsten-Khodotovitch; Yuliya Bichyk; Volha Berazniova; Mariya Vorona	6:48.87	Germany; Peggy Waleska; Marita Scholz; Manuela Lutze; Kerstin El Qalqili-Kowalski	6:49.34
W2-	Great Britain; Katherine Grainger; Cath Bishop	7:04.88	Belarus; Yuliya Bichyk; Natallia Helakh	7:05.89	Romania; Georgeta Damian; Viorica Susanu	7:06.16
W4-	United States; Liane Malcos; Whitney Webber; Caryn Davies; Wendy Wilbur	6:53.08	Netherlands; Sarah Siegelaar; Laura Posthuma; Annemarieke van Rumpt; Helen Tanger	6:54.42	Germany; Ulrike Stadlmayr; Dana Pyritz; Sandra Goldbach; Manuela Zander	6:56.36
W8+	Germany; Elke Hipler; Anja Pyritz; Maja Tucholke; Britta Holthaus; Susanne Schmidt; Nicole Zimmermann; Silke Günther; Lenka Wech; Annina Ruppel	6:41.23	Romania; Georgeta Craciun; Aurica Barascu-Chirita; Liliana Gafencu; Viorica Susanu; Maria Magdalena Dumitrache; Elisabeta Lipă-Pleniuc; Georgeta Damian-Andrunache; Doina Ignat; Elena Georgescu-Nedelc	6:44.63	Canada; Jacqui Cook; Karen Clark; Rachel Dunnet; Andréanne Morin; Darcy Marquardt; Pauline Van Roessel; Roslyn McLeod; Buffy-Lynne Williams-Alexander; Sarah Pape	6:45.53
Women's lightweight events
LW1x	Canada; Fiona Milne	7:52.87	Croatia; Mirna Rajle Brođanac	7:54.49	Germany; Janet Radünzel	7:56.53
LW2x	Germany; Marie-Louise Dräger; Claudia Blasberg	7:14.55	Australia; Sally Causby; Amber Halliday	7:17.28	Romania; Constanța Burcică; Camelia Mihalcea	7:18.24
LW4x	China; Li Quan; Deng Yanping; Tan Meiyun; Zhou Weijuan	6:36.43	Netherlands; Mariel Pikkemaat; Danielle Broekhuizen; Anne van Drumpt; Judith van Os	6:40.95	Australia; Bronwen Watson; Sally Newmarch; Marguerite Houston; Miranda Bennett	6:42.02
LW2-	Romania; Alina Scurtu; Mihaela Niga	7:30.26	Great Britain; Julia Warren; Michelle Dollimore	7:32.53	Greece; Elpida Grigoriadou; Angeliki Gkremou	7:34.50

=== Para ===
Pararowing (or adaptive rowing) was for the second time included in rowing world championships in 2003.

Event:	Gold:	Time	Silver:	Time	Bronze:	Time
TAMix2x; TA mixed double scull	United States; Scott Brown; Angela Madsen	4:21.72	Italy; Agnese Moro; Enio Billiato	6:43.29	only two boats competed	
LTAM4x+ LTA men's coxed four	Great Britain; Paul Askam-Spencer; Alan Crowther; Mathew Harrison; Hugh Huddy; Loretta Williams (cox)	3:16.38	Germany; Silke Tampe; Philipp Torwesten; Bernd Fromm; Marcus Klemp; Arne Maury (cox)	3:40.95	Greece; Antonis Axagororaris; Lampros Giouroukis; Konstantinos Monachos; Athanasios Kitromilidis; George-Christos Polakis (cox)	3:46.30
LTAMix4x+ LTA mixed coxed four	Australia; Jennifer Emerson; Julia Veness-Collins; Gene Barrett; Ben Felten; Susie Edwards (cox)	3:46.81	Netherlands; Catharina Bijl; Marianna Huijben; Paul de Jong; Martin Lauriks; Helen op den Velde-Berger (cox)	3:53.84	Portugal; Bruno Indio; José Pereira; Sonia Costa; Monica Campizes Ferreira; Isabel Jesus (cox)	3:57.23
ASM1x; AS men's singles	Australia; Peter Taylor	(?)	Great Britain; Rob Holliday	(?)	United States; Dale Doornek	(?)

== Medal table ==
Place	Nation	1st place, gold medalist(s)	2nd place, silver medalist(s)	3rd place, bronze medalist(s)	Total
1	Germany	4	4	7	15
2	United States	3	2	1	6
3	Italy	3	1	1	5
4	Canada	3	0	2	5
5	Australia	2	3	1	6
6	Denmark	2	0	0	2
7	Great Britain	2	4	1	6
8	Romania	1	1	2	4
9	France	1	0	1	2
10	China	1	0	0	1
10	Norway	1	0	0	1
10	New Zealand	1	0	0	1
10	Bulgaria	1	0	0	1
14	Netherlands	0	3	0	3
15	Belarus	0	2	1	3
16	Croatia	0	2	0	2
17	Poland	0	1	1	2
17	Czech Republic	0	1	1	2
19	South Africa	0	0	1	1
19	Greece	0	0	1	1
19	Slovenia	0	0	1	1
19	Russia	0	0	1	1
19	Ireland	0	0	1	1
Total		24	24	24	72
