= Peter Rudge =

British rowing cox

Personal information
- Born: 21 October 1981 (age 44)

Sport
- Sport: Rowing
Medal record
Men's rowing
Representing Great Britain
World Rowing Championships
Silver medal – second place	2003 Milan	Coxed four
Bronze medal – third place	2001 Lucerne	Coxed four

Peter Rudge (born 21 October 1981) is a British former rowing cox.

== Career ==
Rudge began rowing in 1994 at The King's School, Chester. He read Theology at Durham University, where he competed for the university boat club, and graduated in 2003.

Selected for the Great Britain senior squad as an undergraduate, Rudge won bronze as part of the British Coxed Four at the 2001 World Championships, and took silver at the 2003 World Championships in the same event.

He continued his studies at Hughes Hall, Cambridge and represented Cambridge in the 2005 Boat Race and the 2006 race.
