= Damien Margat =

French rower

Personal information
- Born: 10 April 1983 (age 43)

Sport
- Sport: Rowing
Medal record
Men's rowing
Representing France
World Rowing Championships
Gold medal – first place	2004 Banyoles	Lwt eight
Bronze medal – third place	2003 Milan	Lwt eight

Damien Margat (born 10 April 1983) is a French lightweight rower. He won a gold medal at the 2004 World Rowing Championships in Banyoles with the lightweight men's eight.
