= Jean-Baptiste Dupy =

French rower (born 1979)

Personal information
- Born: 23 December 1979 (age 46)

Sport
- Sport: Rowing
Medal record
Men's rowing
Representing France
World Rowing Championships
Gold medal – first place	2001 Lucerne	Lwt eight

Jean-Baptiste Dupy (born 23 December 1979) is a French lightweight rower. He won a gold medal at the 2001 World Rowing Championships in Lucerne with the lightweight men's eight.
