= Ioan Florariu =

Romanian rower (born 1979)

Medal record

Men's rowing

Representing Romania

World Rowing Championships
Gold medal – first place	2001 Lucerne	M8+
Bronze medal – third place	2001 Lucerne	M2+

Ioan Florariu (born 13 January 1979 in Bucecea) is a Romanian rower.
