= Christian Dahlke =

German rower

Personal information
- Born: 4 January 1969 (age 57)

Sport
- Sport: Rowing
Medal record
Men's rowing
Representing Germany
World Rowing Championships
Gold medal – first place	2003 Milan	Lwt eight
Silver medal – second place	2002 Seville	Lwt eight

Christian Dahlke (born 4 January 1969) is a German lightweight rower. He won a gold medal at the 2003 World Rowing Championships in Milan with the lightweight men's eight.
