= Erwan Péron =

French rower

Personal information
- Born: 25 May 1980 (age 46)

Sport
- Sport: Rowing
Medal record
Men's rowing
Representing France
World Rowing Championships
Gold medal – first place	2001 Lucerne	Lwt eight

Erwan Péron (born 25 May 1980) is a French lightweight rower. He won a gold medal at the 2001 World Rowing Championships in Lucerne with the lightweight men's eight. He also competed in the men's coxless pair event at the 2008 Summer Olympics.
