= Bernd Heidicker =

German rower

Medal record

Men's rowing

Representing Germany

World Rowing Championships
Gold medal – first place	2002 Seville	M4-
Gold medal – first place	2006 Eton	M8+
Silver medal – second place	2001 Lucerne	M4-
Silver medal – second place	2007 Munich	M8+
Bronze medal – third place	2003 Milan	M4-

Bernd Heidicker (born 5 April 1978 in Recklinghausen) is a German rower.
