= Jörg Lehnigk =

German rower

Medal record

Men's rowing

Representing Germany

World Rowing Championships
Bronze medal – third place	2003 Milan	LM4x

Jörg Lehnigk (born 8 January 1980 in Greifswald) is a German rower.
