= Angeliki Gremou =

Greek rower (born 1975)

Personal information
- Nationality: Greek
- Born: 20 March 1975 (age 50); Ioannina, Greece

Sport
- Sport: Rowing

Angeliki Gremou (born 20 March 1975) is a Greek rower. She competed at the 1996 Summer Olympics and the 2000 Summer Olympics. She also competed in the 1998 World Rowing Championships winning a bronze medal in the lightweight women's quadruple sculls and the 2003 World Rowing Championships also winning a bronze medal in the lightweight women's double sculls alongside Elpida Grigoriadou.
