= Scott Frandsen =

Canadian rower (born 1980)

Medal record

Men's rowing

Representing Canada

Olympic Games
Silver medal – second place	2008 Beijing	Coxless pair

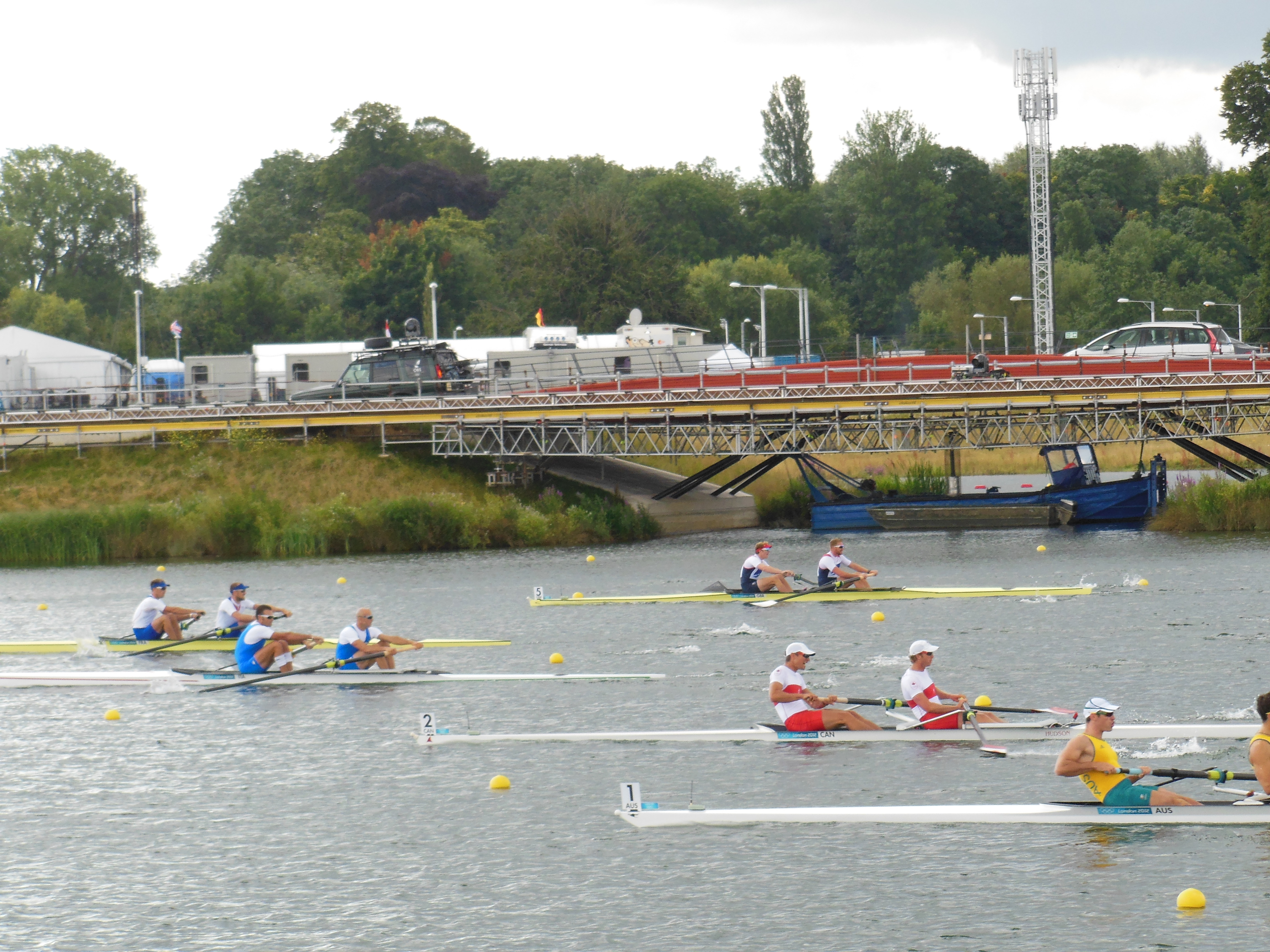
Rowing the final (in red/white) of the men's coxless pair at the 2012 Summer Olympics.

Scott A. Frandsen (born 21 July 1980) is a Canadian rower of Danish and Swedish descent.

== Biography ==
Born in Kelowna, British Columbia, he began rowing at age 16 at Brentwood College School, in Mill Bay, British Columbia.

He crewed for four years at the University of California, Berkeley. His freshman boat in 1999, coached by Craig Amerkhanian, finished second at the Intercollegiate Rowing Association championship, which serves as the national championship race for men's collegiate rowing in the United States. In 2000, 2001, and 2002, he was in the varsity eight man crew, which won the IRA championship each year. In 2000 and 2001, his boats were undefeated and are considered by many as the fastest collegiate boats ever.

In 2003, he went to St Edmund Hall, Oxford, for graduate work. There he crewed for the university in the Oxford Blue Boat against rivals Cambridge in The Boat Race. Despite their diminutive stature his Oxford crew won a dramatic race by the smallest ever recorded margin (one foot), and in so winning, they overturned the biggest weight deficit in the history of the contest. They achieved this by over-rating and out-racing their heavier Cambridge counterparts on the outside of the long Surrey bend through the middle of the race. This took considerable guts and fortitude, and the attitude the crew exemplified in doing so was reflective of Frandsen's natural tenacity and stubbornness. Commentators cite this tenacity as the main factor allowing the Oxford crew to upset the much bigger, more powerful and more experienced 2003 Cambridge boat.

Frandsen went on to row that summer with one of his Cambridge rivals from the 2003 Boat Race, Wayne Pommen, at the 2003 World Rowing Championships in Milan. The Boat Race pairing took sixth place for Canada in a hotly contested final of the coxless pairs event.

The following year Frandsen pursued selection for the 2004 Athens Olympics. He won two gold medals on the 2004 World Cup circuit, both in the Men's Eight event (in Munich, Germany and in Lucerne, Switzerland). At the 2004 Summer Olympics he was in the Canadian Men's Eight (M8+) which was the favourite for the event. His boat narrowly lost out to the Americans in the Heat, with both crews going under the previous World Record time. Come the Final the Canadians had a disappointing row and finished out of the medals in fifth place.

In 2005, Frandsen was again in the Canadian Men's Eight. This time, his boat finished seventh at the World Championships held in Gifu-Nagaragawa, Japan. After a frustrating couple of years in the Canadian National Team system, at the 2008 Summer Olympics in Beijing, China Scott won a silver medal in the Men's coxless pairs with David Calder. It was Canada's first medal of the Games. Terry Paul coached them for the event.

He and David Calder teamed again at the 2012 Summer Olympics, finishing 6th in the final.
