= Kaspar Hebblewhite =

Australian rower

Personal information
- Born: 3 July 1983 (age 42)
- Years active: 1999-2004

Sport
- Country: Australia
- Sport: Rowing
Medal record
Men's rowing
Representing Australia
World Rowing Championships
Bronze medal – third place	2004 Banyoles	LM8-

Kaspar Hebblewhite (born 3 July 1983) is a Tasmanian born Australian former representative lightweight rower. He won a bronze medal at the 2004 World Rowing Championships.

== Club and state rowing ==
Hebblewhite was born in Hobart to John Hebblewhite and Adriane (nee Elbrecht). His mother Adriane was a medical doctor who worked for a number of years with the Huon Valley Health Centre until her 2013 death. Kaspar Hebblewhite was educated at the Friends' School in Hobart where he was introduced to rowing. He rowed in that school's first VIII in 2001 with his future Australian lightweight crew-mate Sam Waley. Following school Hebblewhite's senior club rowing was from the Lindisfarne Rowing Club. In 2002 he held a scholarship with the Tasmanian Institute of Sport.

He made state selection for Tasmania in the bow seat of the 2001 youth eight contesting the Noel Wilkinson Trophy at the Interstate Regatta within the Australian Rowing Championships. He rowed in three consecutive Tasmanian youth eights from 2001 to 2003. His brother Ben coxed those 2001 and 2002 Tasmanian youth eights.

== International representative rowing ==
Hebblewhite made his Australian representative debut in 2001 in a junior coxless four which competed at the 2001 Junior World Rowing Championships in Duisburg and rowed to a seventh placing. In 2003 he was selected to an U23 lightweight quad scull which raced to a seventh place at the World Rowing Cup III in Lucerne before contesting the 2003 World Rowing U23 Championships in Belgrade where they placed fourth.

In 2004 Hebblewhite stepped up to the Australian senior lightweight squad and into the lightweight eight which was crewed by five Tasmanian rowers. That crew rowed to bronze medal at the 2004 World Rowing Championships in Banyoles, Spain.
