= Birger Schmidt =

German rower

Personal information
- Born: 16 July 1980 (age 45)

Sport
- Sport: Rowing
Medal record
Men's rowing
Representing Germany
World Rowing Championships
Gold medal – first place	2003 Milan	Lwt eight

Birger Schmidt (born 16 July 1980) is a German lightweight rower. He won a gold medal at the 2003 World Rowing Championships in Milan with the lightweight men's eight.
