= Andrew Ireland (rower) =

Canadian rower

Medal record

Men's rowing

Representing Canada

World Rowing Championships
Silver medal – second place	2004 Banyoles	M4+
Bronze medal – third place	2005 Gifu	M4-

Andrew Ireland is a Canadian rower. He won a silver medal in the men's coxed four at the 2004 World Rowing Championships and a bronze medal at the 2005 World Rowing Championships in the men's coxless four.
