= Naomi Hoogesteger =

British rower

Medal record

Women's rowing

Representing Great Britain

World Championships
Bronze medal – third place	2005 Kaizu	LW4x

Naomi May Jensen Hoogesteger is a former British rower.

== Education ==
Hoogesteger studied Modern Languages at Durham University and completed an MA by Research in Spanish in 2006. While there she took up rowing at Durham University Boat Club.

== Career ==
In rowing, Hoogesteger was a member of the crew that won the Bronze medal in the Lightweight Women's Four at the 2005 World Rowing Championships.

In 2011 Hoogesteger, alongside David Hosking, formed part of a team that broke the world record for rowing across the Atlantic Ocean.
