= Mandy Emmrich =

German rower (born 1980)

Personal information
- Born: 15 March 1980 (age 46) Dresden, Germany
- Height: 179 cm (5 ft 10 in)
- Weight: 68 kg (150 lb)

Sport
- Country: Germany
- Sport: Rowing
Medal record
Rowing
Representing Germany
World Championships
Silver medal – second place	2005 Gifu	W4-
World Junior Championships
Silver medal – second place	1998 Ottensheim	W4-

Mandy Emmrich (born 15 March 1980) is a retired German rower who competed at international level events. She was a former World silver medalist in both senior and junior levels in the women's lightweight fours.
