= Paul Dienstbach =

German rower

Medal record

Men's rowing

Representing Germany

World Rowing Championships
Gold medal – first place	2002 Seville	M4-
Silver medal – second place	2001 Lucerne	M4-
Bronze medal – third place	2003 Milan	M4-

Paul Dienstbach (born 10 October 1980 in Giessen) is a German rower. He has competed for Germany in the World Rowing Championships.
