= Carsten Borchardt =

German rower

Personal information
- Born: 9 May 1977 (age 49)

Sport
- Sport: Rowing
Medal record
Men's rowing
Representing Germany
World Championships
Gold medal – first place	2003 Milan	Lwt eight

Carsten Borchardt (born 9 May 1977) is a German lightweight rower. He won a gold medal at the 2003 World Rowing Championships in Milan with the lightweight men's eight.
