= Wilma Dressel =

German rower (born 1983)

Medal record

Women's rowing

Representing Germany

World Rowing Championships
Silver medal – second place	2005 Gifu	W4-

Wilma Dressel (born 29 August 1983 in Dortmund) is a German rower.
