= Fleur Chew =

Australian rower

Personal information
- Born: 29 July 1981 (age 44)

Sport
- Sport: Rowing
- Club: Mercantile Rowing Club
Medal record
Women's rowing
Representing Australia
World Rowing Championships
Gold medal – first place	2005 Gifu, Japan	W8+

Fleur Chew (born 29 July 1981) is an Australian former representative rower. She was a seven-time national champion and a world champion in 2005.

== Club and state rowing ==
Born in Melbourne, Chew's senior rowing was done from the Mercantile Rowing Club. She was club captain there in 2010 and 2011.

Chew was selected in Victorian senior women's eights to contest the Queen's Cup at the Interstate Regatta within the Australian Rowing Championships on six consecutive occasions from 2003 to 2008. Those crews were victorious each year from 2005 to 2008.

In Mercantile club colours she contested all three sweep-oared women's heavyweight national Australian titles at the Australian Rowing Championships in 2005, 2006, 2007 and 2008. She won the Coxless four title in 2005 and won national titles in the women's eight in a composite Victorian crew in 2005 and in an all-Mercantile crew in 2006.

== International representative rowing ==
She made her first Australian senior representative appearance in 2003 at the World Rowing Cup III in Lucerne in a Coxless four. Three Australian fours raced in that event and Chew's crew – a development foursome – were picked by selectors to contest that year's World Rowing U23 Championships in Belgrade Serbia where they won a silver medal with Chew in the stroke seat.

At the World Rowing Cups I and II in Europe in 2005 Chew secured her six seat in eight whilst also contesting in smaller boats. She raced in a scull at the first Cup event at Eton, Dorney and raced in a pair with Emily Martin at the second WRC in Munich. They won the bronze and were the 2nd best performing of the three pairs raced by the members of the eight. At the 2005 World Rowing Championships in Gizu, Japan – her sole appearance for Australia at a senior World Championship – Chew won gold and a world title in six seat of the women's eight.
