= Felix Drahotta =

German rower (born 1989)

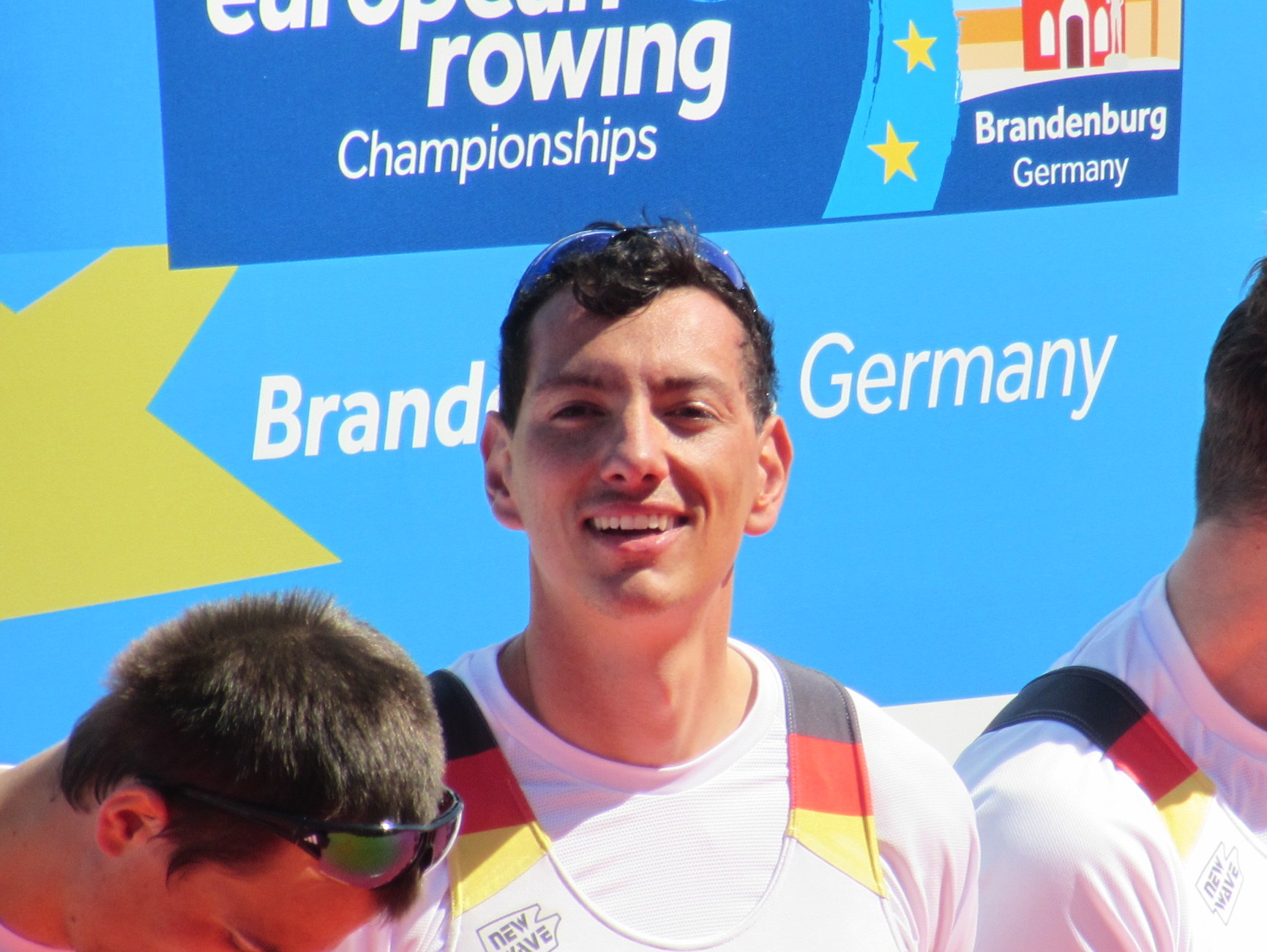
- Drahotta in 2016

Personal information
- Born: 1 January 1989 (age 37) Bad Doberan, East Germany
Medal record
Men's rowing
Representing Germany
Olympic Games
| Silver medal – second place | 2016 Rio de Janeiro | M8+ |
World Championships
| Silver medal – second place | 2013 Chungju | M8+ |
| Silver medal – second place | 2014 Amsterdam | M8+ |
| Silver medal – second place | 2015 Aiguebelette | M8+ |
European Championships
| Gold medal – first place | 2013 Seville | M8+ |
| Gold medal – first place | 2014 Belgrade | M8+ |
| Gold medal – first place | 2015 Poznan | M8+ |
| Gold medal – first place | 2016 Brandenburg | M8+ |

Felix Drahotta (born 1 January 1989) is a German former representative rower. He is a three-time Olympian, an Olympic silver medallist and rowed in the German men's eight at consecutive World Rowing Championships from 2013 and 2015.

Along with Tom Lehmann he finished 4th in the men's coxless pair at the 2008 Summer Olympics. He and Anton Braun finished 7th in the men's pair at the 2012 Summer Olympics. At the 2016 Summer Olympics in Rio de Janeiro, he rowed in Germany's men's eight which won the silver medal.

== Personal ==
Drahotta was born in Bad Doberan, East Germany. His club rowing was from the Rostock Rowing Club until and then the Bayer Leverkusen Rowing Club.

Drahotta along with the other eight 2016 Olympic silver medal rowers was awarded the Silbernes Lorbeerblatt (Silver Laurel Leaf), Germany's highest sports award, for the achievement.

== International rowing career ==
At the world class level, he rowed in the German men's eights that won silver at the 2013, 2014 and 2015 World Championships.

At the European level, he was in the German eight who won gold at the 2013, 2014, 2015 and 2016 European championships. The 2016 Europeans were on home water in Brandenburg.
