= Isabel Jesus =

Portuguese rower (born 1970)

Personal information
- Nationality: Portuguese
- Born: 26 April 1970 (age 56)
Medal record
Women's rowing
Representing Portugal
World Championships
Bronze medal – third place	2003 Milan	LTAMix4+
Silver medal – second place	2004 Catalonia	LTAMix4+
Silver medal – second place	2005 Gifu	LTAMix4+

Isabel Jesus (born 26 April 1970) is a former Portuguese rower.

She was part of the Portuguese squad which competed in the pararowing at 2005 World Rowing Championships, and won a silver medal.
