= Tom Solesbury =

British rower (born 1980)

Tom Solesbury (born 23 September 1980 in Farnborough) is a British rower. He competed in the coxless pairs at the 2008 Summer Olympics and the quadruple sculls at the 2012 Summer Olympics.

In 2021, he set a world record for 30-minute indoor rowing (9,207 meters) for his age group (40-49).
