= Michele Savrie =

Italian rower

Personal information
- Born: 3 August 1984 (age 41)

Sport
- Sport: Rowing
Medal record
Men's rowing
Representing Italy
World Rowing Championships
Gold medal – first place	2005 Kaizu, Gifu	Lwt eight
Gold medal – first place	2006 Dorney	Lwt eight
Bronze medal – third place	2007 Munich	Lwt eight

Michele Savrie (born 3 August 1984) is an Italian lightweight rower. He won a gold medal at the 2005 World Rowing Championships in Kaizu with the lightweight men's eight.
