= Luke Pougnault =

Australian rower

Personal information
- Born: 13 June 1980 (age 46) Perth, Western Australia
- Education: Trinity College, Perth
- Years active: 1994 - 2003

Sport
- Sport: Rowing
Medal record
Men's rowing
Representing Australia
World Rowing Championships
Silver medal – second place	2003 Milan	M2+

Luke Pougnalt (born 13 June 1980) is an Australian teacher and former rower. He was an Australian youth national champion and a medalist at senior World Rowing Championships. He currently works at Ballarat Grammar, where he served as Director of Rowing from 2011 to 2015.

== State and club rowing ==
Pougnault attended Trinity College, Perth, where he took up rowing.

Pougnault first made state selection for Western Australia in the 1998 youth eight contesting the Noel Wilkinson Trophy at the Australian Rowing Championships. He competed in the West Australian youth eight again in 1999 and 2000, rowing to a victory at the Interstate Regatta in 2000. In 2001 he was selected in the Western Australia senior eight contesting the King's Cup at the Interstate Regatta. He rowed in further West Australian King's Cup eights crew in 2002 and 2003.

== International representative rowing ==
Pougnalt made his Australian representative debut in a coxed pair at the World Rowing Cup III in Lucerne where he placed second. Later that year at the 2000 World Rowing U23 Championships in Copenhagen he raced a coxless pair with Josh Keogh to a fourth placing. At the 2001 World Rowing U23 Championships in Linz he again placed fourth, this time in the Australian coxless four.

In 2002, he was in contention for the Australian eight and raced in that boat the World Rowing Cup III in Munich to a second placing. However, he did not secure a seat in the eight at the 2002 World Rowing Championships in Seville where he raced in the coxed four. The four did not make the final, being eliminated in a repechage. In 2003, he rowed in the men's eight and in a coxless pair (with Jonathan Fievez) at the World Rowing Cup III in Lucerne and then at the 2003 World Rowing Championships he and Fievez raced as a coxed pair with Marc Douez up front. They won a silver World Championship medal.

== Personal life ==
In 2011, Pougnalt transferred from Western Australia to Ballarat, Victoria, where he served as Ballarat Grammar's Director of Rowing from 2011 to 2015. In 2012, his crew won Boys' Head of the Lake, a school regatta held annually on Lake Wendouree. He is currently a teacher and staff member at the school.
