= Matthias Hobein =

German rower

Personal information
- Born: 11 February 1981 (age 45)

Sport
- Sport: Rowing
Medal record
Men's rowing
Representing Germany
World Rowing Championships
| Gold medal – first place | 2003 Milan | Lwt eight |
| Silver medal – second place | 2002 Seville | Lwt eight |

Matthias Hobein (born 11 February 1981) is a German lightweight rower. He won a gold medal at the 2003 World Rowing Championships in Milan with the lightweight men's eight.
