= Nicky Coles =

New Zealand rower

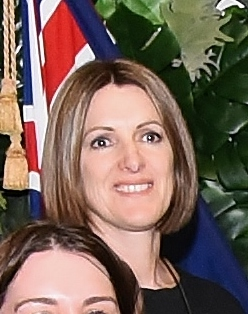
- Coles in 2018

Personal information
- Born: Nicola Anne Coles; 7 January 1972 (age 54) Auckland, New Zealand
- Height: 178 cm (5 ft 10 in)
- Weight: 73 kg (161 lb)
Medal record
Women's rowing
Representing New Zealand
World Championships
Gold medal – first place	2005 Gifu	W2-
Silver medal – second place	2001 Lucerne	W4-
Silver medal – second place	2006 Eton	W2-

Nicola Anne Coles (married name Austin; born 7 January 1972 in Auckland) is a New Zealand rower.

In 2001, she won silver at the World Championships in Lucerne, Switzerland as stroke in the four with teammates Jackie Abraham-Lawrie (bow), Kate Robinson (2), and Rochelle Saunders (3).
