= Brentwood College School =

Coordinates: 48°39′11″N 123°33′14″W

Location
- 2735 Mount Baker Road; Mill Bay, British Columbia, V8H 1K8; Canada

Information
- School type: Private day and boarding
- Motto: De Manu in Manum (From Hand to Hand)
- Founded: 1923
- Head of School: Garth Chalmers
- Staff: 135
- Grades: 8–12
- Enrollment: 350 boarders and 80 local day students
- Language: English
- Area: 77 acres (310,000 m^{2})
- Colours: Red, White, and Black
- Mascot: Big Torch
- Website: www.brentwood.bc.ca
- Last updated: 2009

Brentwood College School is a co-educational boarding school. Brentwood is located on Vancouver Island in Mill Bay, British Columbia, Canada.

== History ==
Brentwood was first founded in 1923. The original location was in Brentwood Bay near Saanich on Vancouver Island, from where its name was derived. The original school was destroyed by a fire in 1947, leaving only the chapel intact. The current school is located westward directly across the bay from the original site, in Mill Bay. The new version of the school opened in September 1961. In 1972, Brentwood College became the first all-boys boarding school in Canada to gradually integrate girls, starting with 20 grade 12 students, becoming officially co-ed for the fall session.

== Campus ==
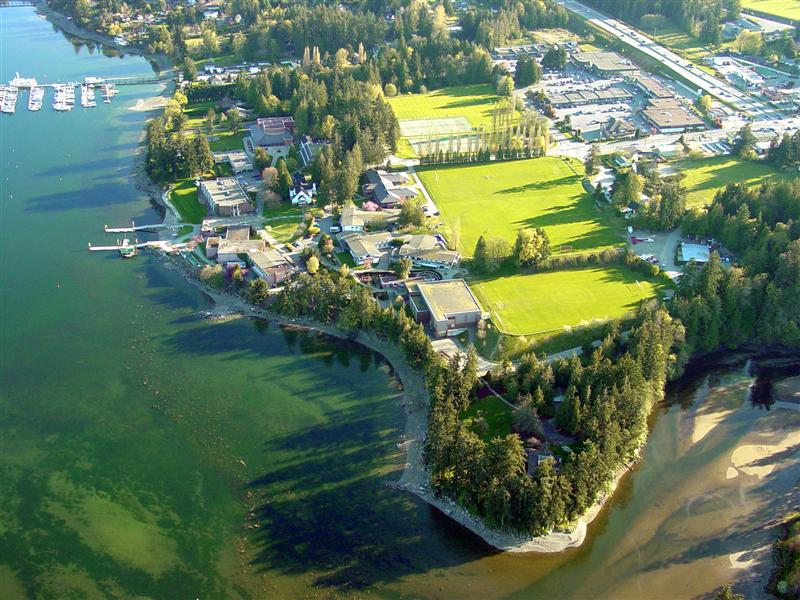
Aerial view of Brentwood College School

Brentwood's 77-acre oceanfront campus has a dozen tennis courts, four rugby fields, eight student residences, two academic buildings, a rowing boathouse, laundry facilities, a cafeteria, a sportsplex, and a health centre.

=== Sustainable buildings ===
Brentwood's sustainable building use a geothermal loop for heating and cooling as part of the school's commitment to sustainable energy.

==== T. Gil Bunch Centre ====
In 2003, the T. Gil Bunch Centre was built. This 20,000-square-foot (1,900 m^{2}) facility includes a 431-seat theatre, dance studio, media arts room, green room, four dressing rooms, and other production related spaces as well as a music suite.

==== Art and Mary Jane Crooks Hall ====
In 2010, Crooks Hall was built featuring an oceanfront dining room and student services centre that seats 350 people at rectangular tables. Crooks Hall also houses The Saville Centre for Business and Entrepreneurship, School Store, and Laundry and Mail Services.

==== Centre for Arts and Humanities ====
In 2012, Brentwood added a new facility to house the school's fine arts programs and humanities courses. This building is 30,000 sq. ft., located on Brentwood's oceanfront, and houses 16,000 sq.ft. of visual arts studios, two digital media studios, and a 25' high entrance leading into a long corridor art gallery.

== Curriculum ==
Brentwood offers university preparatory education from grade 8 to 12. Brentwood has been ranked consistently as one of the top academic high schools in British Columbia. Students participate in Brentwood's tripartite program (academics, arts, and athletics). All graduates attend post-secondary education (78% to their first choice of university). The most popular countries for post-secondary education are Canada, Scotland, England, and the United States. Brentwood's 2015 graduates received offers from over 138 universities with 678 offers of admission, including Oxford University, Duke University, Brown University, Colgate University, Queen's University, University of Victoria, University of British Columbia, and University of St Andrews.

Students can take British Columbia provincial examinations, Advanced Placement exams, courses and the American SAT prep tutorials.

== Extracurricular activities, clubs, and organizations ==
* Grad Committee- Organizes social events throughout the year- funds raised go to the Grad Bursary Fund (GRAD)
- Student Activities Council (SAC)
- Student Executive Council (SEC)
- Student Peer Assistance Resource Counselors (SPARC)
- Brentwood Environmental Action Team (BEAT)
- Open-Minded Non-Discriminatory INDIVIDUALS in support of the LGBTQ community (OMNI)

== Scholarships ==
Currently, the school offers bursaries, financial aid, and The Governor's Entrance Scholarship to eligible Canadian students. Approximately 20% of students receive some type of financial assistance.

== Athletics ==
=== Highlights ===
- 2016 Jr. Boys Basketball Provincial Champions
- 2015 Sr. Boys Soccer Provincial Champions
- 2009 Rowing Boys Overall Points National Champions
- 2009 Rowing Junior Boys National Champions (4 Gold)
- 2009 Provincial Champions, Girls' Rugby
- 2009, 2008 Provincial Champions, Boys' Rugby
- 2008 Canadian Junior Boys & Junior Girls National High School Champions, Rowing
- 2007 Sr. Girls Volleyball Provincial Champions
- 2006 Sr. Girls Volleyball Provincial Champions
- 2007 Finalist, Henley Royal Regatta, England, Rowing
- 2007 Rowing Senior Men National Champions (8 and 4)
- 2007 Rugby Provincial Finalists, Boys' Rugby
- 2006, 2003, 2002, 2000 Canadian Men's National High School Champions, Rowing
- 2006 Provincial, Vancouver Island and ISA Champions, Girls' Volleyball
- 2005 Canadian Junior Boys' National High School Champions, Rowing
- 2005, 2004 Provincial Girls' Rugby Champions (Tier 2)
- 2004, 2001, 2000 Provincial Tennis Champions
- 2003 Canadian Women's National High School Lightweight Champions, Rowing
- 2003 Canadian Champions - Overall points - Girls - Rowing
- 2001, 2000 Canadian National High School Champions, Rowing

=== Rowing ===
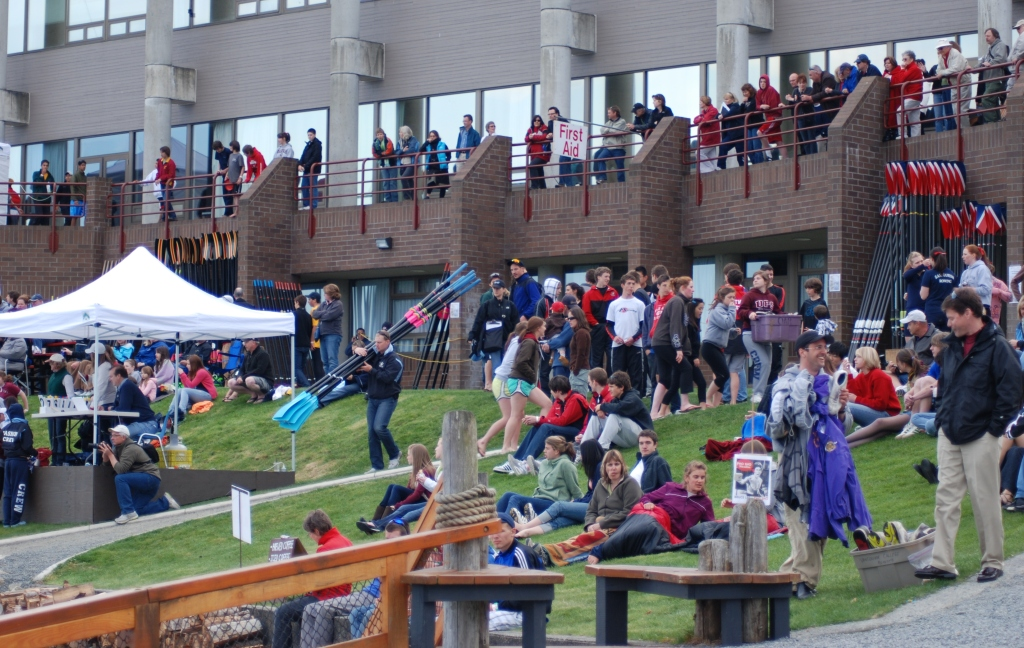
Spectators and rowers at 2009 Brentwood Regatta

Brentwood College has been continuing to gain a sound reputation in the rowing world. Brentwood College graduates include 2008 Beijing Olympic medalists Scott Frandsen (Class of 1998), Dave Calder (Class of 1996) in the Men's Heavyweight 2- event, and Malcolm Howard (Class of 2001) in the Men's Heavyweight 8+ event.

Brentwood has hosted its own regatta annually since the early 1970s, inviting high schools and junior clubs across Canada and the United States to participate in a 1,500 metre sprint. The regatta is held every year in April for three days. The Brentwood regatta is a large high school rowing regatta, attracting over 1,500 athletes and coaches in 2009.

== Notable alumni ==
- Lieutenant Commander John H Stubbs (1930) – WWII commander of HMCS Athabaskan
- Hon. Alastair Gillespie, P.C. O.C. (1941) – senior member of Pierre Trudeau's cabinet
- Dr. Wade Davis (1971) – ethnobotanist, author, and activist
- Capt. Chris Van Vliet (1979) - Member of the Snowbirds Aerobatic fleet (2000–2001)

=== Olympic athletes ===
- Ian Roberts - Equestrian
- Blair Horn - Rower
- Harold Backer - Rower
- Darren Barber - Rower
- David Calder - Rower
- Tom Herschmiller - Rower
- Scott Frandsen - Rower
- Connor Grimes - Hockey Player
- Malcolm Howard - Rower

== Affiliations ==
- CAIS - Canadian Accredited Independent Schools
- FISA - Federation of Independent School Associations
- NAIS - National Association of Independent Schools
- SSATB - Secondary School Admission Test Board
- TABS - The Association of Boarding Schools
- WBSA - Western Boarding Schools Association
