= Marita Scholz =

German rower (born 1977)

Medal record

Women's rowing

Representing Germany

World Rowing Championships
| Gold medal – first place | 2001 Lucerne | W4x |
| Gold medal – first place | 2002 Seville | W4x |
| Silver medal – second place | 1999 St. Catharines | W4- |
| Bronze medal – third place | 2003 Milan | W4x |

Marita Scholz (born 25 January 1977 in Dresden) is a German rower.
