= David Porzig =

Personal information
- Born: 11 April 1974 (age 52) Cape Town, South Africa
- Education: St Stithians College SA; Hale School, AUST

Sport
- Sport: Rowing
Medal record
Men's rowing
Representing Australia
World Rowing Championships
Bronze medal – third place	Aiguebelette 1997	M8+

David Porzig (born 11 April 1974, in Cape Town) is a South African-born, former Australian representative former rower. He is a former Australian national champion, a medalist at World Rowing Championships and a winner of the Grand Challenge Cup at the Henley Royal Regatta

== Club and state rowing ==
Porzig learned to row at St Stithians College in Johannesburg. In 1989, Porzig's family emigrated to Perth, Australia, where he continued to row at Hale School.

Porizg first made state selection for Western Australia in the 1993 West Australian senior eight contesting the King's Cup at the Interstate Regatta. Porzig rowed in further West Australian King's Cup eights crew in 1994, 1995, 1996.

Like his brother, Porzig applied for and won a scholarship to the Australian Institute of Sport in Canberra. During his senior Australian representative years, Porzig was selected in Australian Capital Territory eights to contest the King's Cup at the Interstate Regatta. He stroked the ACT eight of 1997 to a King's Cup victory and stroked two more ACT eights in 1998 and 1999.

In his seven consecutive King's Cup appearances – whether for Western Australia or the Australian Capital Territory – Porzig rowed each one in a crew with his older brother Nick Porzig.

== International representative rowing ==
Porzig made his national representative debut in the Australian men's eight in 1997. He raced at two World Rowing Cups in Europe that year and then at the Henley Royal Regatta as an Australian Institute of Sport crew the eight contested and won the 1997 Grand Challenge Cup. Porzig then finished his 1997 debut international season in the four seat of the eight when they competed at the 1997 World Rowing Championships in Aiguebelette and won a bronze medal.

Porzig continued on in the eight for the 1998 World Rowing Championships in Cologne where they rowed to a sixth placing. In 1999 the crew raced at the World Rowing Cup III before contesting the 1999 World Rowing Championships in St Catharine's Canada where they missed the A final and finished in seventh place. His brother Nick, after a one-year break, returned to the Australian eight in 1997 and they raced together in that boat in 1998 and 1999.

== Surfboats ==
In stillwater retirement Porzig took up surfboat rowing. He was in a North Cottesloe Beach SLSC boat with Jonathan Fievez (another international representative stillwater rower) which won the open men's surfboat category at the World Surflifesaving Championships in Victoria in 2006. He contested and won the open men's surfboat category at the Australian national titles racing for North Cottesloe Beach SLSC in the consecutive years of 2006, 2007, 2008 and 2009. As of 2018 Porzig was still competing in master's events in surfboat rowing.
