= Martin Hasse (rower) =

German rower

Personal information
- Born: 21 February 1970 (age 56)
- Height: 186 cm (6 ft 1 in)
- Weight: 71 kg (157 lb)

Sport
- Sport: Rowing
Medal record
Men's rowing
Representing Germany
World Championships
Gold medal – first place	2003 Milan	Lwt eight

Martin Hasse (born 21 February 1970) is a German lightweight rower. He won a gold medal at the 2003 World Rowing Championships in Milan with the lightweight men's eight.
