= Matthew Rich =

- Born: 24 June 1987 (age 39) Glasgow, Scotland
- Height: 5 ft 11 in (180 cm)
- Weight: 187 lb (85 kg; 13 st 5 lb)
- Position: Forward
- Shoots: Right
- ScNL team Former teams: Paisley Pirates; Manchester Phoenix
- Playing career: 2005–present

Matthew Rich (born 24 June 1987 in Glasgow, Scotland) is a Scottish professional ice hockey player, currently plays for Paisley Pirates in the Scottish National League. In 2005, he began his professional career, playing for the Edinburgh Capitals. Before this, Rich had still been playing at a high standard, having iced for the Scotland national team at U-13, U-15, U-17, and U-19 levels. He had also been playing for local teams in Scotland, such as the Paisley Pirates.

In his first professional season with Edinburgh, the young right-winger showed promise and dedication, playing 49 games but only managing to rack up six points in this time. Despite the low points return, Rich signed for the Newcastle Vipers for the 2006/07 EIHL season, but only played nine games for them before signing for the Manchester Phoenix part-way through the season to play under fellow Scot Tony Hand, a team-mate of his in Edinburgh.

During the 2006/07 season, Rich showed himself to be a willing and hard-working player, but mostly played on the third line, a situation which limited his point-scoring opportunities. Rich has struggled with injuries during the 2007/08 season and was only able to play his first game for the Phoenix in December 2007. Injuries have continued to hamper Rich's career, and he was ruled out for the rest of the 2007/08 season, this time with a knee injury.

Rich's extensive injury problems resulted in his release from the Manchester Phoenix at the end of the 2007/08 season, and it is doubtful whether he will be fit enough to play at EIHL level again during his career, although it is hoped he can make a full recovery. Rich took the opportunity after being released by Manchester to return to his native Scotland and sign for the Paisley Pirates. Rich, after two seasons out, signed for the English National North League 1 team Whitley Warriors. He made his debut against the Flintshire Freeze in an 11–3 victory, picking up a goal and an assist.
