= Matt Rich (publicist) =

American public relations executive (born 1954)

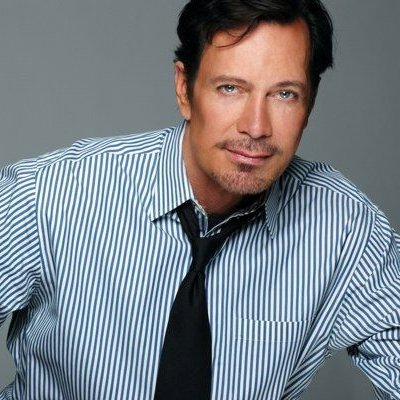
- Rich in 2012

Matt Rich (born October 13, 1954 in Riverside, California) is an American public relations executive whose clients have included Donald Trump, Halston, Randolph Duke, Patty Hearst, Judy Collins, Dottie Frank, Jackie Onassis, Victoria Gotti and the Gotti family.

== Biography ==
After graduating from the Fletcher School of Law and Diplomacy in 1977, Rich moved to New York City and became a protégée of designer Roy Halston Frowick, better known simply as Halston. They fell in with the fashion crowd of the time: Andy Warhol, Truman Capote, Liza Minnelli, and Calvin Klein, and Rich took a job as an assistant publicist for Studio 54.

A 1995 New York Magazine article described the scene at Studio 54, quoting Rich: "One night, P.R. agent Matthew Rich watched a model spy a rolled-up $100 bill between some cushions on a sofa in Studio's celebrities-only basement. 'She unrolled, snorted it, licked it, and then threw it on the ground, having gotten what she wanted.' Rich says."

Rich worked with author Dottie Frank and was mentioned by name in the dedications of her best-selling novels Plantation and Isle of Palms.

Rich was Jackie Onassis' press agent for her last public appearance at Grand Central station for the hundredth anniversary of the Municipal Art Society. Onassis said of his ability to get reporters out of her way: "Matthew, you commanded those press just like a field marshal!"

In 1989, Rich founded the boutique firm PlanetPR. As of 2005, his clients included Stephen Baldwin and Rachel Hirschfeld. He ceased work as Victoria Gotti's press agent after she pretended to have breast cancer for publicity's sake, a move he did not endorse. He also worked with art collector Stuart Pivar in 2007. Since 1997, Rich has worked as a consultant for Donald Trump's Miss Universe Organization. He coordinates press and appearances for the Miss Universe, Miss USA and Miss Teen USA title-holders, and frequently accompanies them to red-carpet events.

== In popular culture ==
Rich was mentioned in a 2013 episode of Celebrity Apprentice 6 (Season 13) wherein Baldwin insisted to other competitors: "Call Matt Rich!"
