= Alessandro Lodigiani =

Italian lightweight rower (born 1980)

Personal information
- Born: 5 September 1980 (age 46)

Sport
- Sport: Rowing
Medal record
Men's rowing
Representing Italy
World Championships
Gold medal – first place	2002 Seville	LM8+
Gold medal – first place	2004 Banyoles	LM4x

Alessandro Lodigiani (born 5 September 1980) is an Italian lightweight rower. He won a gold medal at the 2004 World Rowing Championships in Banyoles with the lightweight men's quadruple scull.
