= Li Quan (martial artist) =

Li Quan (in Chinese language 李全) was born in Qiqihar, Heilongjiang Province, on 9 December 1973. He is a martial artist who studied under famous masters, such as Grandmaster Dai Kang.

As a child, he was fascinated by kung fu and was inspired by his grandfather. He then joined the local kung fu community and was taught by more professional kung fu masters.

Aged 17, he joined the Chinese Wu Shu Academy in Hebei Province. In the year 1991, he became the team captain of the Northeast China Amateur Wu Shu Team. Two years later he moved to Sichuan Province, where he has been residing ever since. First he studied and taught at the Chinese Gong Fu Research Academy in Deyang and then he became a family member of the Dai Shi Men Wu Shu Institute in Hanyuan (led by Grandmaster Dai Kang).

Among other assignments, Master Li Quan was asked to teach self-defence and martial arts techniques to airport and in-flight security, work as an unarmed bodyguard for highly endangered individuals in hostile environments, train Chinese police in self-defence and apprehension tactics as well as PLA troops in hand-to-hand combat. He also graduated with a degree in English language from the University of Sichuan. In 2005, Master Li Quan became Champion in the 78 kg weight class of the prestigious San Da Wu Shu Tournament.

For the 2008 Beijing Olympic Games he was asked to become head of security for Olympic Torch Relay across the People’s Republic of China. He was made responsible for planning and logistics for the three-month tour across 37 cities. During the Olympics itself, he acted as security liaison between Holland House and the Beijing Public Security Bureau, helping to coordinate security for Dutch dignitaries, including the Prince and the Prime Minister.

Master Li Quan focuses on instilling traditional kung fu in his students, whether locals or individuals from other countries. He named his school Kung Fu Family (武道之家), highlighting the family aspect of kung fu practitioners as well as the close bond between master and student (highly influenced by the guru-chela tradition of Indian culture).

Among other media, Ya'an Ribao, Sichuan Jingji Ribao, and the South China Morning Post have been reporting on Master Li Quan's school. He employs traditional training techniques to bring students closer to the roots of kung fu. The school, located in the San Sheng Xiang area of Chengdu, features traditional equipment used in kung fu schools, such as historical weapons, iron circles, stone dumbbells, heavy sandbags, and ba gua poles. His approach to Chinese kung fu incorporates not only physical exercises, but also meditation techniques, combat strategies, nurturing Qi levels, mental exercises, studying how the body operates, medical knowledge, and learning about herbs and their healing effects.
