= Morten Nielsen (rower) =

Danish rower

Personal information
- Nationality: Danish
- Born: 18 September 1980 (age 46) Fredensborg, Denmark

Sport
- Sport: Rowing

Morten Nielsen (born 18 September 1980) is a Danish rower. He competed in the men's coxless pair event at the 2008 Summer Olympics.
