= Tom Lehmann (rower) =

German rower

Tom Lehmann (born 4 December 1987) is a German rower. Along with Felix Drahotta he finished 4th in the men's coxless pair at the 2008 Summer Olympics.
