= Audrey Galy =

French rower (born 1984)

Personal information
- Nationality: French
- Born: 30 May 1984 (age 42)

Sport
- Country: France
- Sport: Rowing
Medal record
Representing France
World Championships
Gold medal – first place	2004 Catalonia	W4-

Audrey Galy (born 30 May 1984) is a French rower. She won a gold medal at the 2004 World Rowing Championships on the Lake of Banyoles in Catalonia, Spain, in the women's four event.
