= Li Quan (rower) =

Chinese rower

Li Quan is a Chinese lightweight rower.

At the 2003 World Rowing Championships in Milan, Italy, she won a gold medal in the lightweight women's quadruple sculls.
