= Matt Rich (rower) =

American rower

Matt Rich (born April 30, 1975) is a retired American rower.

Rich was born in 1975 in Westmont, United States. He rowed for Princeton TC and took up rowing in 1994. At the 2003 World Rowing Championships in Milan, Italy, he won a gold medal in the men's coxed pair, alongside Dan Beery as stroke and Andrew Kelly as coxswain.
