= Giuseppe Del Gaudio =

Italian lightweight rower

Personal information
- Born: 13 March 1976 (age 50)

Sport
- Sport: Rowing
Medal record
Men's rowing
Representing Italy
World Championships
Gold medal – first place	2002 Seville	Lwt eight
Gold medal – first place	2005 Kaizu, Gifu	Lwt eight
Silver medal – second place	2004 Banyoles	Lwt eight
Bronze medal – third place	2001 Lucerne	Lwt pair

Giuseppe Del Gaudio (born 13 March 1976) is an Italian lightweight rower. He won a gold medal at the 2002 World Rowing Championships in Seville with the lightweight men's eight.
