= Giuseppe De Vita =

Italian rower

Personal information
- Nationality: Italian
- Born: 4 June 1982 (age 42); Naples, Italy

Sport
- Sport: Rowing

Giuseppe De Vita (born 4 June 1982) is an Italian rower. He competed at the 2004 Summer Olympics and the 2008 Summer Olympics.
