= Gaudio =

Gaudio is a surname. Notable people with the surname include:

- Bob Gaudio (born 1942), American singer
- Bob Gaudio (American football) (1925–2003), American football player
- Dino Gaudio (born 1957), American basketball coach
- Eugene Gaudio (1886–1920), Italian-American cinematographer and brother of Tony
- Gastón Gaudio (born 1978), Argentine tennis player
- Ivan Sergei Gaudio (born 1971), American actor
- Natália Gaudio (born 1992), Brazilian gymnast
- Tony Gaudio (1883–1951), Italian-American cinematographer and brother of Eugene

== See also ==
- DelGaudio
