= 2001 World Rowing Championships =

International rowing event

- Venue: Rotsee
- Location: Lucerne, Switzerland
- Dates: 19 to 26 August

The 2001 World Rowing Championships were held from 19 to 26 August 2001 at Rotsee in Lucerne, Switzerland.

== Medal summary ==
=== Men ===
Non-Olympic classes

Event	Gold	Time	Silver	Time	Bronze	Time
M1x	Norway; Olaf Tufte	6:43.04	Slovenia; Iztok Čop	6:43.36	Czech Republic; Václav Chalupa	6:43.62
M2x	Hungary; Ákos Haller (b); Tibor Pető (s)	6:14.16	France; Adrien Hardy (b); Sébastien Vieilledent (s)	6:14.29	Italy; Rossano Galtarossa (b); Alessio Sartori (s)	6:14.43
M4x	Germany; Christian Schreiber (b); André Willms (2); Marco Geisler (3); Andreas Hajek (s)	5:40.89	Netherlands; Geert Cirkel (b); Dirk Lippits (2); Diederik Simon (3); Michiel Bartman (s)	5:42.64	Italy; Nicola Sartori (b); Mattia Righetti (2); Franco Berra (3); Simone Raineri (s)	5:42.87
M2+	Great Britain; James Cracknell (b); Matthew Pinsent (s); Neil Chugani (c)	6:49.33	Italy; Mattia Trombetta (b); Lorenzo Carboncini (s); Andrea Monizza (c)	6:49.75	Romania; Cornel Nemțoc (b); Ioan Florariu (s); Marin Gheorghe (c)	6:54.45
M2-	Great Britain; James Cracknell (b); Matthew Pinsent (s)	6:27.57	Yugoslavia; Đorđe Višacki (b); Nikola Stojić (s)	6:27.59	South Africa; Ramon di Clemente (b); Donovan Cech (s)	6:29.31
M4+	France; Gilles Bosquet (b); Vincent Gazan (2); Vincent Millot (3); Sidney Chouraqui (s); Christophe Lattaignant (c)	6:08.25	Italy; Luca Agamennoni (b); Edoardo Verzotti (2); Massimo Cascone (3); Luca Ghezzi (s); Gianluca Barattolo (c)	6:09.71	Great Britain; Chris Martin (b); Henry Adams (2); Alex Partridge (3); Dan Ouseley (s); Peter Rudge (c)	6:11.62
M4-	Great Britain; Toby Garbett (b); Steve Williams (2); Ed Coode (3); Rick Dunn (s)	5:48.98	Germany; Sebastian Thormann (b); Paul Dienstbach (2); Philipp Stüer (3); Bernd Heidicker (s)	5:50.56	Slovenia; Jani Klemenčič (b); Milan Janša (2); Rok Kolander (3); Matej Prelog (s)	5:52.23
M8+	Romania; Daniel Măstăcan (b); Florin Corbeanu (2); Cornel Nemțoc (3); Ioan Florariu (4); Ovidiu Cornea (5); Andrei Bănică (6); Gheorghe Pîrvan (7); Vasile Măstăcan (s); Marin Gheorghe (c)	5:27.48	Croatia; Oliver Martinov (b); Damir Vučičić (2); Tomislav Smoljanović (3); Nikša Skelin (4); Siniša Skelin (5); Krešimir Čuljak (6); Igor Boraska (7); Branimir Vujević (s); Silvijo Petriško (c)	5:28.47	Germany; Sebastian Schulte (b); Thorsten Engelmann (2); Johannes Dobershütz (3); Stephan Koltzk (4); Jörg Dießner (5); Enrico Schnabel (6); Ulf Siems (7); Michael Ruhe (s); Peter Thiede (c)	5:29.41
Men's lightweight events
LM1x	Ireland; Sam Lynch	6:49.38	Italy; Stefano Basalini	6:51.71	Czech Republic; Michal Vabroušek	6:53.02
LM2x	Italy; Elia Luini (b); Leonardo Pettinari (s)	6:16.75	Poland; Tomasz Kucharski (b); Robert Sycz (s)	6:19.45	France; Fabrice Moreau (b); Thibaud Chapelle (s)	6:20.30
LM4x	Italy; Daniele Gilardoni (b); Luca Moncada (2); Mauro Baccelli (3); Filippo Mannucci (s)	5:50.76	Greece; Nikolaos Skiathitis (b); Ioannis Korkouritis (2); Vasileios Polymeros (3); Panagiotis Miliotis (s)	5:52.87	Japan; Akio Yano (b); Hitoshi Hase (2); Atsushi Obata (3); Kazuaki Mimoto (s)	5:54.19
LM2-	Ireland; Gearoid Towey (b); Tony O'Connor (s)	6:34.72	Netherlands; Simon Kolkman (b); Robert van der Vooren (s)	6:36.40	Italy; Massimo Guglielmi (b); Giuseppe Del Gaudio (s)	6:36.99
LM4-	Austria; Sebastian Sageder (b); Bernd Wakolbinger (2); Wolfgang Sigl (3); Martin Kobau (s)	5:53.55	Denmark; Thomas Ebert (b); Thor Kristensen (2); Søren Madsen (3); Eskild Ebbesen (s)	5:54.36	France; Laurent Porchier (b); Jean-Christophe Bette (2); Yves Hocdé (3); Xavier Dorfman (s)	5:55.55
LM8+	France; Jean-Baptiste Dupy (b); Erwan Péron (2); Laurent Porchier (3); Franck Bussière (4); Pascal Touron (5); Jean-Christophe Bette (6); Yves Hocdé (7); Xavier Dorfman (s); Christophe Lattaignant (c)	5:37.21	Denmark; Morten Riis (b); Stephan Mølvig (2); Thomas Croft Buck (3); Kenneth Bülow (4); Rasmus Hjortshøj (5); Svend Pedersen (6); Jesper Krogh (7); Morten Hansen (s); Sebastian Claus (c)	5:37.99	United States; Erik Miller (b); Eric Feins (2); Gavin Blackmore (3); Tom Paradiso (4); John Cashman (5); Ben Cotting-Gagne (6); John Wall (7); Eric Kratochvil (s); Bill McManus (c)	5:38.80

=== Women ===
Non-Olympic classes

Event	Gold	Time	Silver	Time	Bronze	Time
W1x	Germany; Katrin Rutschow-Stomporowski	7:19.25	Russia; Yuliya Levina	7:23.28	Belarus; Ekaterina Karsten-Khodotovitch	7:25.18
W2x	Germany; Kathrin Boron (b); Kerstin Kowalski	6:50.20	New Zealand; Georgina Evers-Swindell (b); Caroline Evers-Swindell (s)	6:51.73	Belarus; Ekaterina Karsten-Khodotovitch (b); Volna Berazniova (s)	6:52.72
W4x	Germany; Peggy Waleska (b); Marita Scholz (2); Manuela Lutze (3); Manja Kowalski (s)	6:12.95	New Zealand; Sonia Waddell (b); Paula Twining (2); Caroline Evers-Swindell (3); Georgina Evers-Swindell (s)	6:15.35	United States; Sarah Jones (b); Carol Skricki (2); Hilary Gehman (3); Laura Rauchfuss (s)	6:18.30
W2-	Romania; Georgeta Damian (b); Viorica Susanu (s)	7:01.27	Belarus; Olga Tratsevskaya (b); Yuliya Bichyk (s)	7:03.51	Canada; Jacqui Cook (b); Karen Clark (s)	7:05.52
W4-	Australia; Jane Robinson (b); Julia Wilson (2); Jo Lutz (3); Victoria Roberts (s)	6:27.23	New Zealand; Jackie Abraham-Lawrie (b); Kate Robinson (2); Rochelle Saunders (3); Nicky Coles (s)	6:28.58	Netherlands; Christine Vink (b); Carin ter Beek (2); Anneke Venema (3); Femke Dekker (s)	6:30.81
W8+	Australia; Jodi Winter (b); Jo Lutz (2); Julia Wilson (3); Jane Robinson (4); Emily Martin (5); Rebecca Sattin (6); Victoria Roberts (7); Kristina Larsen (s); Carly Bilson (c)	6:03.66	Romania; Elena Pirvan (b); Aurica Bărăscu (2); Natalita Berteanu-Pelin (3); Elena Gavrilescu (4); Mihaela Nastasa (5); Doina Spircu-Craciun (6); Georgeta Damian-Andrunache (7); Viorica Susanu (s); Rodica Anghel (c)	6:04.96	Germany; Silke Günther (b); Anja Pyritz (2); Dana Pyritz (3); Britta Holthaus (4); Susanne Schmidt (5); Sandra Goldbach (6); Maja Tucholke (7); Lenka Wech (s); Annina Ruppel (c)	6:05.32
Women's lightweight events
LW1x	Ireland; Sinéad Jennings	7:33.20	Netherlands; Mirjam ter Beek	7:34.43	Switzerland; Pia Vogel	7:36.26
LW2x	Germany; Janet Radünzel (b); Claudia Blasberg (s)	6:55.55	Poland; Katarzyna Demianiuk (b); Ilona Mokronowska (s)	6:58.02	Romania; Monica Eremia-Stan (b); Irina Acsinte (s)	6:58.97
LW4x	Australia; Catriona Roach (b); Sally Causby (2); Amber Halliday (3); Josephine Lips (s)	6:29.68	United States; Marny Jaastad (b); Abigail Cromwell (2); Jennifer Edwards (3); Stacey Borgman (s)	6:32.64	Netherlands; Mariel Pikkemaat (b); Maud Klinkers (2); Aukje Zuidema (3); Hedi Poot (s)	6:33.70
LW2-	Great Britain; Sarah Birch (b); Jo Nitsch (s)	7:23.00	United States; Suzanne Walther (b); Michelle Borkhuis (s)	7:25.37	Argentina; Patricia Conte(b); Ana Urbano (s)	7:26.02

== Medal table ==
Place	Nation	1st place, gold medalist(s)	2nd place, silver medalist(s)	3rd place, bronze medalist(s)	Total
1	Germany	5	1	2	9
2	Great Britain	4	0	1	5
3	Australia	3	0	0	3
3	Ireland	3	0	0	3
5	Italy	2	3	3	8
6	France	2	1	2	5
6	Romania	2	1	2	5
8	Austria	1	0	0	1
8	Hungary	1	0	0	1
8	Norway	1	0	0	1
11	Netherlands	0	3	2	5
12	Denmark	0	3	0	3
12	New Zealand	0	3	0	3
14	Poland	0	2	0	2
15	Belarus	0	1	2	3
15	United States	0	1	2	3
17	Slovenia	0	1	1	2
18	Croatia	0	1	0	1
18	Greece	0	1	0	1
18	Russia	0	1	0	1
18	Yugoslavia	0	1	0	1
22	Czech Republic	0	0	2	2
23	Argentina	0	0	1	1
23	Canada	0	0	1	1
23	Japan	0	0	1	1
23	South Africa	0	0	1	1
23	Switzerland	0	0	1	1
Total		24	24	24	72
