= 2005 World Rowing Championships =

International rowing event

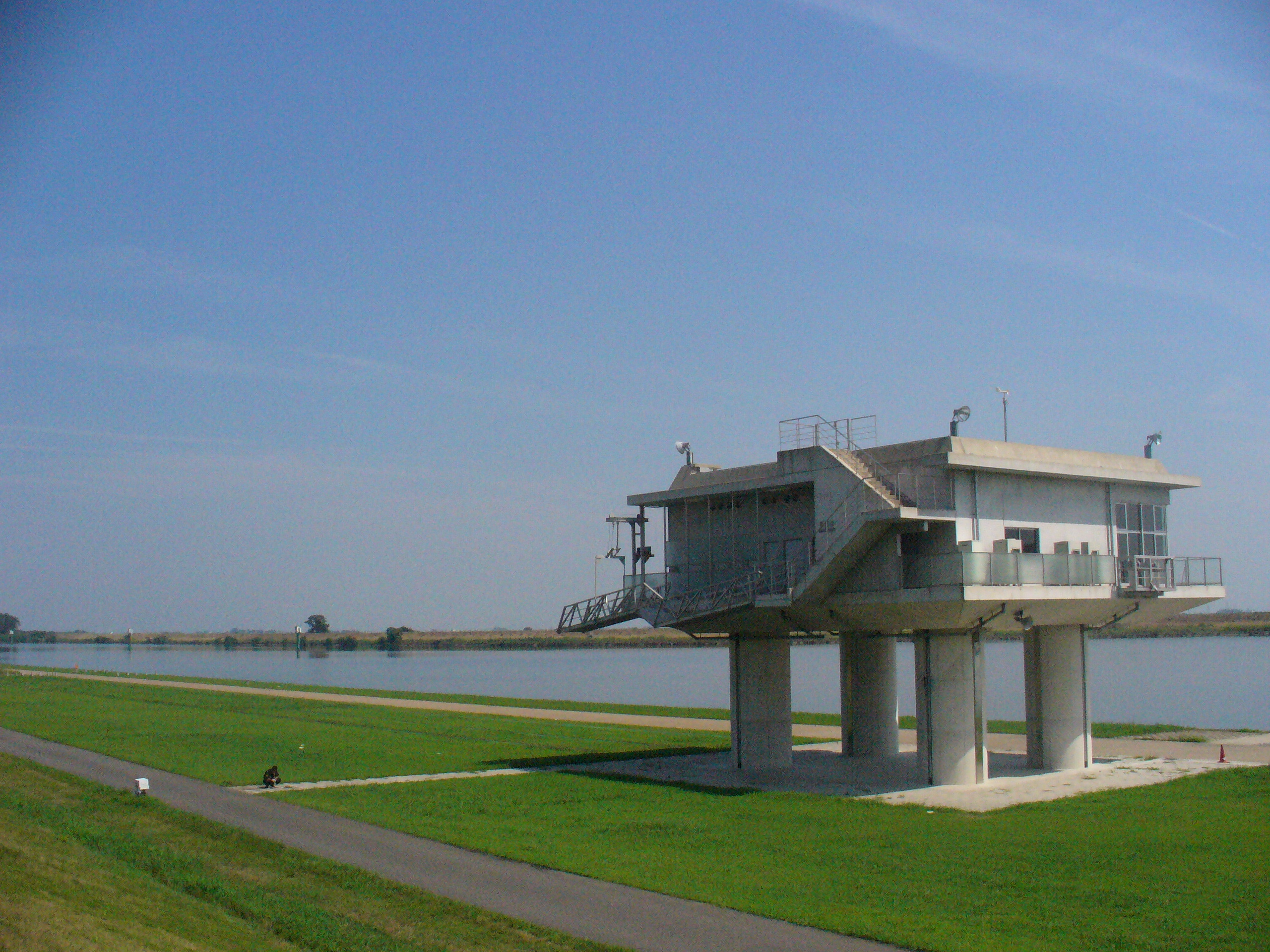
- Nagaragawa International Regatta Course
- Venue: Nagaragawa International Regatta Course
- Location: Kaizu, Gifu, Japan
- Dates: 29 August to 4 September

The 2005 World Rowing Championships were World Rowing Championships that were held from 29 August to 4 September 2005 at the Nagaragawa International Regatta Course in Kaizu, Gifu Prefecture, Japan. The international rowing season usually ends with the World Championship regatta. Apart from the Olympic Games, this is the most prestigious international rowing event attracting over 1,000 rowers. The 2005 championships were the first championships to be held in Asia.

== Medal summary ==
=== Men's events ===
Non-Olympic classes

Event:	Gold:	Time	Silver:	Time	Bronze:	Time
M1x	New Zealand; Mahé Drysdale	7:16.42	Norway; Olaf Tufte	7:18.34	Czech Republic; Ondřej Synek	7:21.12
M2x	Slovenia; Luka Špik; Iztok Čop	6:37.61	Italy; Federico Gattinoni; Luca Ghezzi	6:37.96	Germany; Christian Schreiber; René Burmeister	6:46.71
M4x	Poland; Konrad Wasielewski; Marek Kolbowicz; Michał Jeliński; Adam Korol	5:34.96	Slovenia; Matej Prelog; Davor Mizerit; Luka Špik; Iztok Čop	5:35.45	Estonia; Jüri Jaanson; Leonid Gulov; Tõnu Endrekson; Andrei Jämsä	5:36.61
M2-	New Zealand; Nathan Twaddle; George Bridgewater	6:52.51	South Africa; Ramon di Clemente; Donovan Cech	6:55.52	Italy; Luca Agamennoni; Dario Lari	6:57.29
M2+	Australia; Hardy Cubasch; Sam Conrad; Marc Douez	7:16.61	Italy; Dario Cerasola; Edoardo Verzotti; Manuel Belingerio	7:23.22	United States; Jordan Smith; Micah Boyd; Chase Phillips	7:26.22
M4-	Great Britain; Steve Williams; Pete Reed; Alex Partridge; Andrew Triggs Hodge	6:11.59	Netherlands; Geert Cirkel; Jan-Willem Gabriëls; Matthijs Vellenga; Gijs Vermeulen	6:13.23	Canada; Robert Weitemeyer; Peter Dembicki; Andrew Ireland; Kristopher McDaniel	6:16.02
M4+	France; Nicolas Podpovitny; Vincent Durupt; Alex Johnatan Mathis; Lionel Jacquiot; Nicolas Majerus	6:02.42	United States; Troy Kepper; Matt Hughes; Patrick Sullivan; Brett Newlin; Marcus McElhenney	6:03.44	Germany; Toni Seifert; Matthias Flach; Johannes Doberschütz; Falk Müller; Martin Sauer	6:06.01
M8+	United States; Paul Daniels; Matt Deakin; Steven Coppola; Dan Beery; Josh Inman; Bryan Volpenhein; Beau Hoopman; Marcus McElhenney; Mike Blomquist	5:22.75	Italy; Lorenzo Carboncini; Niccolò Mornati; Pierpaolo Frattini; Valerio Pinton; Mario Palmisano; Dario Dentale; Raffaello Leonardo; Carlo Mornati; Gaetano Iannuzzi	5:24.01	Germany; Jochen Urban; Sebastian Schulte; Stephan Koltzk; Jan-Martin Bröer; Jan Tebrügge; Ulf Siemes; Thorsten Engelmann; Andreas Penkner; Peter Thiede	5:25.66
Men's lightweight events
LM1x	Greece; Vasileios Polymeros	7:17.79	Great Britain; Zac Purchase	7:23.10	France; Fabrice Moreau	7:23.97
LM2x	Hungary; Zsolt Hirling; Tamás Varga	6:05.10	Denmark; Mads Rasmussen; Rasmus Quist Hansen	6:05.62	Poland; Paweł Rańda; Robert Sycz	6:07.93
LM2-	Denmark; Bo Helleberg; Thomas Ebert	6:22.59	Chile; Miguel Cerda; Félipe Leal	6:23.31	Italy; Salvatore Amitrano; Catello Amarante	6:25.63
LM4x	Italy; Gardino Pellolio; Daniele Gilardoni; Luca Moncada; Filippo Mannucci	5:44.76	Belgium; Justin Gevaert; François Libois; Wouter van der Fraenen; Kristof Dekeyser	5:46.00	Canada; Jeff Bujas; Douglas Vandor; Matthew Jensen; Morgan Jarvis	5:47.86
LM4-	France; Franck Solforosi; Jérémy Pouge; Jean-Christophe Bette; Fabien Tilliet	5:47.91	Ireland; Timmy Harnedy; Eugene Coakley; Richard Archibald; Paul Griffin	5:49.26	Italy; Lorenzo Bertini; Salvatore Di Somma; Elia Luini; Bruno Mascarenhas	5:49.30
LM8+	Italy; Jiri Vlcek; Daniele Danesin; Michele Savrie; Martino Goretti; Luigi Scala; Nicola Moriconi; Giuseppe Del Gaudio; Fabrizio Gabriele; Gianluca Barattolo (c)	5:59.42	Japan; Yusuke Imai; Shuya Matsuda; Kazuyoshi Okamoto; Masayuki Yoshizaki; Shimpei Murai; Yu Kataoka; Takehiro Kubo; Tatsuya Mizobe; Makoto Nakasaka (c)	6:09.87	only two teams competed	

=== Women's events ===
Non-Olympic classes

Event:	Gold:	Time	Silver:	Time	Bronze:	Time
W1x	Belarus; Ekaterina Karsten-Khodotovitch	7:48.35	Czech Republic; Miroslava Knapková	7:51.69	United States; Michelle Guerette	7:51.62
W2x	New Zealand; Georgina Evers-Swindell; Caroline Evers-Swindell	7:08.03	Bulgaria; Rumyana Neykova; Miglena Markova	7:10.92	Australia; Amber Bradley; Sally Kehoe	7:22.86
W4x	Great Britain; Rebecca Romero; Sarah Winckless; Frances Houghton; Katherine Grainger	6:09.59	Germany; Britta Oppelt; Susanne Schmidt; Kathrin Boron; Stephanie Schiller	6:09.93	Russia; Olga Samulenkova; Oksana Dorodnova; Larisa Merk; Irina Fedotova	6:12.19
W2-	New Zealand; Juliette Haigh; Nicky Coles	7:43.83	Australia; Sarah Outhwaite; Natalie Bale	7:47.57	Russia; Vera Potchitaeva; Valerya Starodubrovskaya	7:50.07
W4-	Australia; Robyn Selby Smith; Emily Martin; Pauline Frasca; Kate Hornsey	6:55.56	Germany; Mandy Emmrich; Wilma Dressel; Kerstin Naumann; Christiane Hölzel	7:03.24	Belarus; Natallia Haurylenka; Volha Plashkova; Tatsina Narelik; Mariya Brel	7:07.96
W8+	Australia; Sarah Outhwaite; Robyn Selby Smith; Sonia Mills; Kate Hornsey; Emily Martin; Fleur Chew; Pauline Frasca; Sarah Heard; Elizabeth Patrick	5:58.10	Romania; Enikő Barabás; Georgeta Craciun; Camelia Lupașcu; Ana Maria Apachitei; Elena Serban-Parvan; Ioana Papuc; Rodica Florea; Simona Strimbeschi; Rodica Anghel	5:59.50	Netherlands; Femke Dekker; Nienke Dekkers; Nienke Hommes; Hurnet Dekkers; Annamarieke van Rumpt; Laura Posthuma; Annemiek de Haan; Helen Tanger; Ester Workel	5:59.61
Women's lightweight events
LW1x	Netherlands; Marit van Eupen	8:07.39	France; Bénédicte Dorfman	8:10.53	Spain; Teresa Mas De Xaxars Rivero	8:12.71
LW2x	Germany; Daniela Reimer; Marie-Louise Dräger	6:48.47	United States; Renee Hykel; Julia Nichols	6:48.77	Finland; Sanna Stén; Minna Nieminen	6:49.02
LW4x	Canada; Tracy Cameron; Mara Jones; Elizabeth Urbach; Melanie Kok	6:19.87	Denmark; Kirsten Jepsen; Maria Pertl; Katrin Olsen; Juliane Rasmussen	6:20.69	Great Britain; Tanya Brady; Lorna Norris; Hester Goodsell; Naomi Hoogesteger	6:22.49

=== Pararowing ===
World Rowing Championship races in the Para classes are usually held over the Paralympic distance of 1000 meters. Exceptionally at 2005 World Rowing Championships, the LTA mixed coxed four was raced over the Olympic distance of 2000 meters as a trial.

Event:	Gold:	Time	Silver:	Time	Bronze:	Time
ASM1x	Australia; Dominic Monypenny	6:28.82	Italy; Marco Re Calegari	6:31.99	United States; Ronald Harvey	7:08.00
TAMix2x	United States; Angela Madsen; Scott Brown	5:03.28	Italy; Enio Billiato; Valeria Corazzin	6:52.59	France; Christophe Somme; Marie-Pierre Baskevitch Six	7:16.30
LTAMix4+	Great Britain; Alastair McKean; Naomi Riches; Katie-George Dunlevy; Alan Crowther; Loretta Williams (cox)	8:12.07	Portugal; Monica Campizes Ferreira; José Pereira; Bruno Indio; Sonia Costa; Isabel Jesus (cox)	8:22.85	Netherlands; Marianna Huijben; Joleen Hakker; Martin Lauriks; Paul de Jong; Tonia Harmsen (cox)	8:23.52

== Medal table ==
Rank	Nation	Gold	Silver	Bronze	Total
1	New Zealand	4	0	0	4
2	Australia	3	1	1	5
3	Italy	2	3	3	8
4	France	2	1	1	4
4	Great Britain	2	1	1	4
6	Germany	1	2	3	6
7	United States	1	2	2	5
8	Denmark	1	2	0	3
9	Netherlands	1	1	1	3
10	Slovenia	1	1	0	2
11	Canada	1	0	2	3
12	Belarus	1	0	1	2
12	Poland	1	0	1	2
14	Greece	1	0	0	1
14	Hungary	1	0	0	1
16	Czech Republic	0	1	1	2
17	Belgium	0	1	0	1
17	Bulgaria	0	1	0	1
17	Chile	0	1	0	1
17	Ireland	0	1	0	1
17	Japan	0	1	0	1
17	Norway	0	1	0	1
17	Romania	0	1	0	1
17	South Africa	0	1	0	1
25	Russia	0	0	2	2
26	Estonia	0	0	1	1
26	Finland	0	0	1	1
26	Spain	0	0	1	1
Totals (28 entries)		23	23	22	68
