= Oriel College Boat Club =

British rowing club

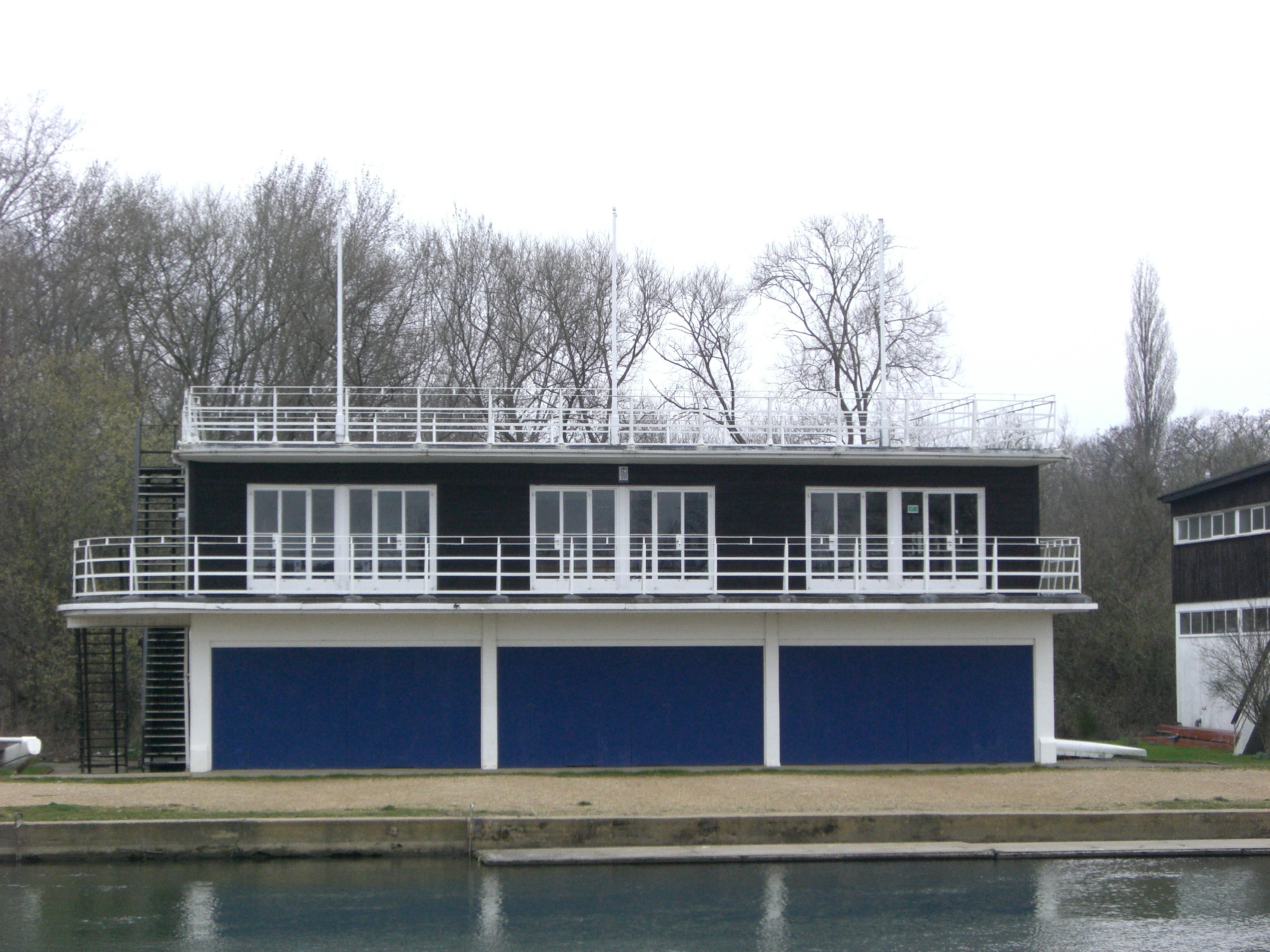

- Boathouse shared with Lincoln and The Queen's (top) and the club's blade colours (bottom)
- Location: Boathouse Island, Christ Church Meadow, Oxford, Oxford
- Coordinates: 51.7432°N 1.2493°W
- Home water: River Thames (known in Oxford as The Isis)
- Founded: pre-1828
- Head of the River: Men's Eights: 1842, 1933, 1934, 1935, 1936, 1966, 1976, 1978, 1979, 1980, 1981, 1982, 1983, 1984, 1987, 1988, 1989, 1992, 1993, 1994, 1996, 1997, 1998, 1999, 2000, 2001, 2002, 2011, 2012, 2014, 2015, 2016, 2019, 2022, 2023, 2024
- Torpids Headship: Men's Torpids: 1838, 1844, 1972, 1973, 1974, 1975, 1976, 1978, 1979, 1980, 1981, 1982, 1983, 1984, 1985, 1986, 1987, 1988, 1989, 1990, 1992, 1993, 1994, 1995, 1996, 1997, 1998, 2001, 2003, 2004, 2005, 2006, 2018, 2019, 2022; Women's Torpids: 2006, 2017, 2018
- University: University of Oxford
- Colours
- Affiliations: British Rowing (boat code ORO); Clare BC (Sister college)
- Website: orielrowing.org

Oriel College Boat Club (OCBC) is the rowing club of Oriel College, Oxford. Rowing at Oriel is carried out from the college's own boathouse across Christ Church Meadow, on Boat House Island.

Oriel is the most successful rowing college in Oxford, having won the most men's 1st VIII headships of any college at the two intercollegiate bumps races: Torpids and Eights Week (Summer Eights). Since 1976, Oriel has enjoyed a particular period of dominance in these events. The club's women's 1st VIII has also won two Torpids headship since the admission to women to the college in 1985.

== Racing ==
In men's rowing at short races, bumps, this is the most successful Oxford college boat club. As of 2020, Oriel holds 37 Torpids Headships, by a large margin the most of any college, and 33 Summer Eights Headships.

From 1972 to 1998 Oriel's Men's First Boat was undefeated in Torpids, the longest run of any college by far. In 2006 Oriel claimed the first ever double headship in Torpids, rowing over as Head of the River in both the men's and women's first divisions. In 2018 Oriel repeated this victory with their second double headship. It is the only college to have achieved a double headship in Torpids.

The women's and men's second boats have long been in "fixed divisions" in the bumps charts, and as such, are guaranteed a place in racing each year. The college usually enters three boats (and sometimes more) for the bumps events. More extensive information on the results of Torpids and Eights can be found here: Oxford Bumps Charts

In addition to the Oxford-based races, Oriel crews compete in external events including the Fairbairn Cup, the Head of the River Race, the Women's Eights Head of the River Race, the Henley Boat Races and many regional and national events.

In 2016 the men's first boat won the men's eights collegiate event at the Fairbairn; it won again in 2017 and won the entire event in 2018.

== Colours and Emblems ==
The emblem of the Oriel College Boat Club.

The general emblem of the Oriel College Boat Club is the three ostrich feathers, an example of Oriel College's use of the Prince of Wales's feathers. In recent years this has been augmented by the addition of crossed-oars below the feathers. The first boats row under the emblem of the Tortoise Club, detailed below, a tradition established from when OCBC would race at external regattas as The Tortoise Club. The boat club's colours are the same as the college's: two white stripes on navy.

=== Oriel Rowing Blazers ===
Until 2009 the wearing of Boat Club Blazers (ivory with navy blue piping and cuff rings, bearing the three ostrich feather emblem on the left breast) was limited to the 1st and 2nd Summer VIII's and Torpids and the Oriel College Boat Club Committee. At that time cuff ring designations were: Three rings for 1st Summer VIII and 1st Torpid; two rings for Boat Club Committee; one ring for 2nd Summer VIII 2nd Torpid. These now obsolete designations can still be seen at the Walters of Oxford website.

Changes brought about in the Oriel Blazer Act of 2009 to become more inclusive of lower-boats' alumni (3rd, 4th, and sometimes 5th VIII's as well as boat coxswains) reformed the cuff ring designations as follows: Three rings for 1st Summer VIII; two rings for 1st Torpid and those awarded Tortoise membership at the Tortoise Council's discretion; one ring for general boat club members (no specific distinction for committee members exists today).

== Cultural Presence ==
In Tom Brown at Oxford by Thomas Hughes, Oriel's win in the 1842 Head of the River Race, with Oriel bumping Trinity, was re-written as Tom's college, "St Ambrose" taking first place and "Oriel" in second place.

Oriel College, in particular the Boat Club Captains' rooms, as well as Oriel memorabilia and references are also present in Oxford Blues (1984) and True Blue (1991).

Recently, Oriel's 2022 First Men's VIII portrayed the 1936 Italian Olympic crew in the film The Boys in the Boat (2023).

== Oriel Regatta ==
During the 7th week in Trinity Term, OCBC hosts the annual Oriel Regatta; events in this competition are Mixed Eights and Crewdate Eights. Mixed Eights are crews from a single college that must contain at least four women rowers. For Crewdate Eights one enters as a group of four rowers with or without a coxswain and are then matched up with another group, where possible creating a mixed college and mixed gender crew. The final two crews have a crewdate paid for them by the Regatta. It is a fun event with which to end the year's collegiate racing schedule. The course runs upstream from the Longbridges Boathouse to past the end of boathouses on Christ Church Island and races are conducted in knock-out format.

== Alumni ==
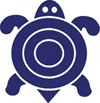
The emblem of the Tortoise Club

=== The Tortoise Club ===
The purpose of the Tortoise Club is two-fold: the recognition and celebration of outstanding Oriel rowing; and the financial support of the OCBC. Membership is by election: proposal by the Men's Captain of Boats, Women's Captain of Boats and the President of the Tortoise Club. Election is by the approval of the Tortoise Council. Members must be Orielenses (excepting Honorary members) who have represented OCBC with excellence.

A grant of a Badge was made to "The Provost and Scholars of the House of the Blessed Mary the Virgin in Oxford commonly called Oriel College of the Foundation of Edward the Second of famous memory sometime King of England", for the use of Oriel College Boat Club, the Tortoise Club and the Oriel Society, by Letters Patent dated 20 April 2009 of Garter, Clarenceux and Norroy and Ulster Kings of Arms.

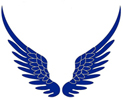
The emblem of the Blessed Virgins Club

=== Former clubs ===
The Blessed Virgins Club

This was an exclusive, women's alumni club. Since 2016, women are now admissible into the Tortoise Club on the same terms as men so the club is defunct. This was particularly controversial to many members of the Tortoise Club as a separate boat club was created for the women of the college in 1986, rowers in their 1st VIII and 1st Torpid became members of this club mutatis mutandis to the Tortoise Club. The respective unique emblem was a pair of (angelic) wings. The "Blessèd Virgins" was a nod to a name of the college as still seen in some registers of title and official documents today, The House of Blessèd Mary the Virgin in Oxford.

=== Noteworthy rowers ===
- Anthony Purssell – British rower, Olympian in 1948
- Chris Mahoney – British rower, Olympian in 1980 and 1984; President of the OUBC in 1981.
- Daniel Lyons – American rower, World Champion in 1986; Olympian in 1988
- Terence Dillon – British Rower, Olympian in 1988 and 1992.
- Michael Wherley – American rower, three times World Champion, 1997, 1998 and 1999; Olympian in 2000 and 2004; won the 2008 Boat Race (as the oldest rower in the history of the event); and was inducted into the US National Rowing Hall of Fame in 2014.
- George Bridgewater – New Zealand rower, Olympian in 2004 and Bronze medallist in the pair at the 2008 Summer Olympics
- Peter Hackworth – British coxswain, cox of the 2002 Blue Boat
- Sjoerd Hamburger – Dutch rower, Olympian in 2008 and 2012
- Chris Mahoney – British rower, Olympic silver medallist in 1980
- Lucas McGee – American rower, USRowing Men's National Team coach
- Malcolm Howard – Canadian rower, Olympic Gold medallist in 2008 and silver medalist in 2012; 2014 OUBC President
- Pete Reed – British rower, Olympic gold medalist in 2008, 2012 and 2016
- Liam Corrigan - American rower, Olympian in 2020
- Tom Mackintosh – New Zealand rower, Olympic gold medalist in 2020
- Nicholas Rusher – American rower, Olympic bronze medalist in 2024

== Honours ==
=== Boat Race representatives ===
The following rowers were part of the rowing club at the time of their participation in The Boat Race.

Men's boat race

Year	Name
1842	G. Drinkwater Bourne
1842	G. E. Hughes
1845	W. Buckle
1849	Chas. Holden Steward
1849	Chas. Holden Steward
1865	E. F. Henley
1866	E. F. Henley
1874	J. S. Sinclair
1900	T. B. Etherington-Smith
1901	T. B. Etherington-Smith
1937	A. B. Hodgson
1938	A. B. Hodgson
1939	G. Huse
1946	R. T. Turner
1946	P. N. Brodie
1946	A. J. R. Purssell
1947	P. N. Brodie
1947	A. J. R. Purssell
1948	G. C. Fisk
1948	P. N. Brodie
1948	A. J. R. Purssell
1949	G. C. Fisk
1950	G. C. Fisk
1974	G. S. Innes
1974	G. E. Morris (cox)
1975	M. G. C. Harris
1975	D. R. H. Beak
1975	G. S. Innes
1976	D. R. H. Beak
1976	G. S. Innes
1977	P. S. T. Wright
1978	J. Fail (cox)
1979	P. J. Head

Year	Name
1979	C. J. Mahoney
1980	N. A. Conington
1980	C. J. Mahoney
1980	T. C. M Barry
1981	P. J. Head
1981	N. A. Conington
1981	C. J. Mahoney
1981	M. D. Andrews
1982	N. A. Conington
1982	G. R. N. Holland
1982	A. K. Kirkpatrick
1984	C. L. B. Long
1986	G. A. Livingston
1987	Peter A. Gish
1987	Tony D. Ward
1987	Richard A. Hull
1988	Richard A. Hull
1989	Guy Blanchard
1989	Terry Dillon
1990	Richard A. Hull
1990	Martin W. Watts (cox)
1991	Peter A. J. Bridge
1992	Peter A. J. Bridge
1996	Adam R. A. Frost
1996	Todd B. Kristol (cox)
1997	Charlie P. A. Humphreys
1998	Charlie P. A. Humphreys
1999	Charlie P. A. Humphreys
2001	Michael F. Bonham
2002	Luke McGee
2002	Peter Hackworth (cox)
2004	Chris Kennelly
2005	Peter Reed

Year	Name
2006	Robin Ejsmond-Frey
2007	Adam Kosmicki
2007	Robin Ejsmond-Frey
2008	Mike Wherley
2008	Oliver Moore
2009	George Bridgewater
2010	Sjoerd Hamburger
2011	Moritz Hafner
2011	George Whittaker
2011	Simon Hislop
2012	William Zeng
2012	Roel Haen
2013	Malcolm Howard
2014	Malcolm Howard
2015	Henry Goodier
2019	Achim Harzheim
2022	Liam Corrigan
2022	Charlie Elwes
2023	James Doran
2024	James Doran
2024	Elliott Kemp
2024	Will Denegri (cox)
2025	William O'Connell
2025	James Doran
2025	Tom Mackintosh
2025	Nick Rusher
2025	Nicholas Kohl
2026	James Fetter
2026	Alexander Sullivan

Women's boat race

Year	Name
2016	Morgan Baynham-Williams (cox)
2023	Claire Aitken
2024	Claire Aitken

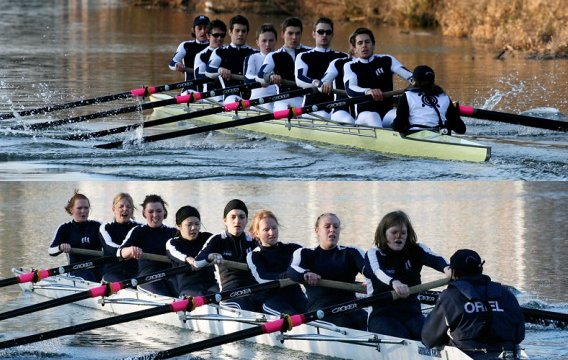
The double headship winning Oriel Men's and Women's Eights crews in 2006.

=== Henley Royal Regatta ===
Year	Races won
1913	Thames Challenge Cup
1938	Visitors' Challenge Cup

== See also ==
- University rowing (UK)
- Oxford University Boat Club
- Rowing on the River Thames
