= Rowing at the 2008 Summer Olympics – Men's double sculls =

Men's double sculls at the Games of the XXIX Olympiad

Medalists
1st place, gold medalist(s)		David Crawshay & Scott Brennan	Australia
2nd place, silver medalist(s)		Tõnu Endrekson & Jüri Jaanson	Estonia
3rd place, bronze medalist(s)		Stephen Rowbotham & Matthew Wells	Great Britain

The men's double sculls competition at the 2008 Summer Olympics in Beijing was held between August 9 and 16 at the Shunyi Olympic Rowing-Canoeing Park.

This rowing event is a double scull event, meaning that each boat is propelled by a pair of rowers. The "scull" portion means that each rower uses two oars, one on each side of the boat; this contrasts with sweep rowing in which each rower has one oar and rows on only one side. The competition consists of multiple rounds. Finals were held to determine the placing of each boat; these finals were given letters with those nearer to the beginning of the alphabet meaning a better ranking. Semifinals were named based on which finals they fed, with each semifinal having two possible finals.

During the first round three heats were held. The top three boats in each heat advanced to the A/B semifinals, while all others went to the repechage. The repechage gave rowers a second chance to reach the top semifinals, with the top three boats in the repechage also advancing to the A/B semifinal. The remaining boats from the repechage went to the C final.

Only A/B semifinals were held. For each of the two semifinal races, the top three boats moved on to the better of the two finals (the A final), while the bottom three boats went to the lesser of the two finals (the B final).

The third and final round was the Finals. Each final determined a set of rankings. The A final determined the medals, along with the rest of the places through 6th. The B final gave rankings from 7th to 12th. The C final determined the rest of the rankings, through 14th.

== Schedule ==
All times are China Standard Time (UTC+8)

Date	Time	Round
Saturday, August 9, 2008	17:00-17:30	Heats
Monday, August 11, 2008	17:20-17:30	Repechage
Wednesday, August 13, 2008	16:30-16:50	Semifinals A/B
Wednesday, August 13, 2008	17:30-17:40	Final C
Friday, August 15, 2008	17:40-17:50	Final B
Saturday, August 16, 2008	17:10-17:20	Final A

== Results ==
=== Heats ===
Qualification Rules: 1-3->SA/B, 4..->R

==== Heat 1 ====
Rank	Rowers	Country	Time	Notes
1	Rob Waddell, Nathan Cohen	New Zealand	6:24.32	SA/B
2	Dzianis Mihal, Stanislau Shcharbachenia	Belarus	6:27.18	SA/B
3	Clemens Wenzel, Karsten Brodowski	Germany	6:29.60	SA/B
4	Bart Poelvoorde, Christophe Raes	Belgium	6:31.84	R
5	Wes Piermarini, Elliot Hovey	United States	6:39.37	R

==== Heat 2 ====
Rank	Rowers	Country	Time	Notes
1	Matthew Wells, Stephen Rowbotham	Great Britain	6:26.33	SA/B
2	Ante Kušurin, Mario Vekić	Croatia	6:27.38	SA/B
3	Tõnu Endrekson, Jüri Jaanson	Estonia	6:27.95	SA/B
4	Aleksandr Kornilov, Aleksey Svirin	Russia	6:44.46	R
5	Haidar Nozad, Hussein Jebur	Iraq	7:00:46	R

==== Heat 3 ====
Rank	Rowers	Country	Time	Notes
1	David Crawshay, Scott Brennan	Australia	6:21.39	SA/B
2	Jean-Baptiste Macquet, Adrien Hardy	France	6:21.92	SA/B
3	Luka Špik, Iztok Čop	Slovenia	6:39.49	SA/B
4	Martin Yanakiev, Ivo Yanakiev	Bulgaria	6:45.03	R
5	Su Hui, Zhang Liang	China	excluded	

=== Repechage ===
Qualification Rules: 1-3->SA/B, 4..->FC

Rank	Rowers	Country	Time	Notes
1	Aleksandr Kornilov, Aleksey Svirin	Russia	6:23.52	SA/B
2	Bart Poelvoorde, Christophe Raes	Belgium	6:24.01	SA/B
3	Martin Yanakiev, Ivo Yanakiev	Bulgaria	6:24.70	SA/B
4	Wes Piermarini, Elliot Hovey	United States	6:26.05	FC
5	Haidar Nozad, Hussein Jebur	Iraq	6:52.71	FC

=== Semifinals A/B ===
Qualification Rules: 1-3->FA, 4..->FB

==== Semifinal A/B 1 ====
Rank	Athlete	Country	Time	Notes
1	David Crawshay, Scott Brennan	Australia	6:21.50	FA
2	Luka Špik, Iztok Čop	Slovenia	6:23.81	FA
3	Rob Waddell, Nathan Cohen	New Zealand	6:24.16	FA
4	Ante Kušurin, Mario Vekić	Croatia	6:24.89	FB
5	Bart Poelvoorde, Christophe Raes	Belgium	6:26.91	FB
6	Clemens Wenzel, Karsten Brodowski	Germany	6:28.46	FB

==== Semifinal A/B 2 ====
Rank	Athlete	Country	Time	Notes
1	Jean-Baptiste Macquet, Adrien Hardy	France	6:18.86	FA
2	Tõnu Endrekson, Jüri Jaanson	Estonia	6:21.11	FA
3	Matthew Wells, Stephen Rowbotham	Great Britain	6:21.15	FA
4	Martin Yanakiev, Ivo Yanakiev	Bulgaria	6:26.62	FB
5	Aleksandr Kornilov, Aleksey Svirin	Russia	6:27.75	FB
6	Dzianis Mihal, Stanislau Shcharbachenia	Belarus	6:32.76	FB

=== Finals ===
==== Final C ====
Rank	Athlete	Country	Time	Notes
1	Wes Piermarini, Elliot Hovey	United States	6:33.15	
2	Haidar Nozad, Hussein Jebur	Iraq	6:52.02	

==== Final B ====
Rank	Athlete	Country	Time	Notes
1	Dzianis Mihal, Stanislau Shcharbachenia	Belarus	6:34.39	
2	Bart Poelvoorde, Christophe Raes	Belgium	6:35.55	
3	Clemens Wenzel, Karsten Brodowski	Germany	6:37.97	
4	Martin Yanakiev, Ivo Yanakiev	Bulgaria	6:45.91	
5	Aleksandr Kornilov, Aleksey Svirin	Russia	6:49.84	
	Ante Kušurin, Mario Vekić	Croatia	DNS	

==== Final A ====
Rank	Athlete	Country	Time	Notes
Gold medal	David Crawshay, Scott Brennan	Australia	6:27.77	
Silver medal	Tõnu Endrekson, Jüri Jaanson	Estonia	6:29.05	
Bronze medal	Matthew Wells, Stephen Rowbotham	Great Britain	6:29.10	
4	Rob Waddell, Nathan Cohen	New Zealand	6:30.79	
5	Jean-Baptiste Macquet, Adrien Hardy	France	6:33.36	
6	Luka Špik, Iztok Čop	Slovenia	6:33.96	
