= Belgium at the 2008 Summer Olympics =

- IOC code: BEL
- NOC: Belgian Olympic and Interfederal Committee
- Website: www.teambelgium.be (in Dutch and French)

in Beijing
- Competitors: 96 in 16 sports
- Flag bearers: Sébastien Godefroid (opening); Tia Hellebaut (closing)
- Medals Ranked 46th: Gold 2 Silver 0 Bronze 0 Total 2

Summer Olympics appearances (overview)
- 1900; 1904; 1908; 1912; 1920; 1924; 1928; 1932; 1936; 1948; 1952; 1956; 1960; 1964; 1968; 1972; 1976; 1980; 1984; 1988; 1992; 1996; 2000; 2004; 2008; 2012; 2016; 2020; 2024; 2028

Other related appearances
- 1906 Intercalated Games

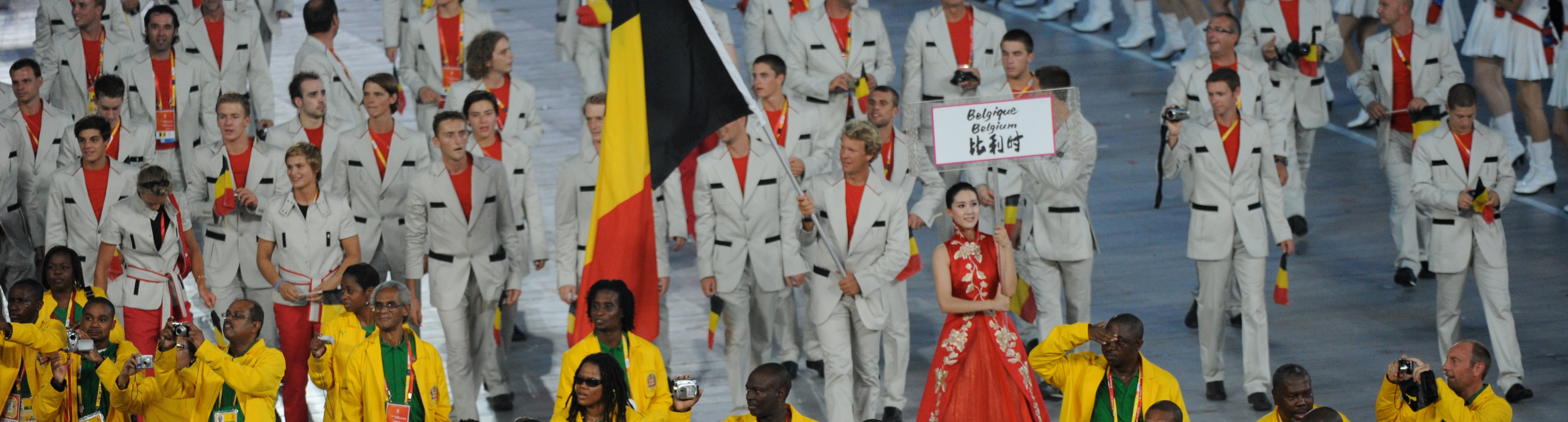
the team of Belgium at the Opening Ceremony

Belgium competed at the 2008 Summer Olympics in Beijing, People's Republic of China. 96 Belgians took part in Beijing, the biggest delegation for the country since 1976. Belgium won 2 gold medals, better achievement than in 2004, when the country won 1 gold and 2 bronze medals.

== Medalists ==
Medal	Name	Sport	Event	Date
Gold	Tia Hellebaut	Athletics	Women's high jump	23 August
Gold^{[a]}	Olivia Borlée; Kim Gevaert; Hanna Mariën; Élodie Ouédraogo	Athletics	Women's 4 × 100 m relay	22 August

- ^{a} Russian team's gold medals were stripped due to anti-doping rules violation by Yulia Chermoshanskaya.

== Athletics ==
Key

- Note–Ranks given for track events are within the athlete's heat only
- Q = Qualified for the next round
- q = Qualified for the next round as a fastest loser or, in field events, by position without achieving the qualifying target
- NR = National record
- N/A = Round not applicable for the event
- Bye = Athlete not required to compete in round

Men
Track & road events

Athlete	Event	Heat		Quarterfinal		Semifinal		Final	
Athlete	Event	Result	Rank	Result	Rank	Result	Rank	Result	Rank
Kristof Beyens	200 m	20.69	3 Q	20.50	3 Q	20.69	8	Did not advance	
Jonathan Borlée	400 m	45:25	4 q	—N/a		45.11	5	Did not advance	
Kévin Borlée	400 m	45:43	4 q	—N/a		44.88 NR	3	Did not advance	
Pieter Desmet	3000 m steeplechase	8:37.99	11	—N/a				Did not advance	
Monder Rizki	5000 m	13:54.41	8	—N/a				Did not advance	
Cédric van Branteghem	400 m	45:54	3 Q	—N/a		45.81	8	Did not advance	
Jonathan Borlée; Kévin Borlée; Arnaud Ghislain; Cédric van Branteghem	4 × 400 m relay	3:00:67 NR	3 Q	—N/a				2:59.37 NR	5

Field events

Athlete	Event	Qualification		Final	
Athlete	Event	Distance	Position	Distance	Position
Kevin Rans	Pole vault	5.45	28	Did not advance	

Combined events – Decathlon

Athlete	Event	100 m	LJ	SP	HJ	400 m	110H	DT	PV	JT	1500 m	Final	Rank
Hans van Alphen	Result	11.28	6.55	14.86	1.84	DNS	—	—	—	—	—	DNF	
Hans van Alphen	Points	799	709	781	661	0	—	—	—	—	—	DNF	
Frédéric Xhonneux	Result	11.41	6.94	13.99	1.90	DNF	DNS	—	—	—	—	DNF	
Frédéric Xhonneux	Points	776	799	728	714	0	0	—	—	—	—	DNF	

Women
Track & road events

Athlete	Event	Heat		Quarterfinal		Semifinal		Final	
Athlete	Event	Result	Rank	Result	Rank	Result	Rank	Result	Rank
Nathalie de Vos	10000 m	—N/a						32:33.45	24
Veerle Dejaeghere	3000 m steeplechase	9:54.65	10	—N/a				Did not advance	
Kim Gevaert	100 m	11.33	1 Q	11.10	3 Q	11.30	6	Did not advance	
Olivia Borlée; Kim Gevaert; Hanna Mariën; Élodie Ouédraogo	4 × 100 m relay	42.92	3 Q	—N/a				42.54 NR	1st place, gold medalist(s)

Field events

Athlete	Event	Qualification		Final	
Athlete	Event	Distance	Position	Distance	Position
Tia Hellebaut	High jump	1.93	1 Q	2.05 NR	1st place, gold medalist(s)

== Canoeing ==
Athlete	Event	Heats		Semifinals		Final	
Athlete	Event	Time	Rank	Time	Rank	Time	Rank
Kevin de Bont; Bob Maesen	Men's K-2 1000 m	3:21.604	4 QS	3:24.148	4	Did not advance	

Qualification Legend: QS = Qualify to semi-final; QF = Qualify directly to final

== Cycling ==
=== Road ===
Men

Athlete	Event	Time	Rank
Mario Aerts	Road race	6:24:01	7
Christophe Brandt	Road race	Did not finish	
Maxime Monfort	Road race	Did not finish	
Maxime Monfort	Time trial	1:07:12	26
Jurgen van den Broeck	Road race	Did not finish	
Johan van Summeren	Road race	6:26:27	42

Women

Athlete	Event	Time	Rank
Lieselot Decroix	Road race	3:36:35	44

=== Track ===
Omnium

Athlete	Event	Points	Laps	Rank
Iljo Keisse	Men's points race	8	0	12
Kenny de Ketele; Iljo Keisse	Men's madison	17	−1	4

=== Mountain biking ===
Athlete	Event	Time	Rank
Filip Meirhaeghe	Men's cross-country	Did not finish	
Sven Nys	Men's cross-country	2:01:00	9
Roel Paulissen	Men's cross-country	2:03:30	19

== Equestrian ==
=== Eventing ===
Athlete	Horse	Event	Dressage		Cross-country			Jumping						Total	
Athlete	Horse	Event	Dressage		Cross-country			Qualifier			Final			Total	
Athlete	Horse	Event	Penalties	Rank	Penalties	Total	Rank	Penalties	Total	Rank	Penalties	Total	Rank	Penalties	Rank
Karin Donckers	Gazelle De La Brasserie	Individual	31.70	2	25.60	57.30	9	4.00	61.30	12 Q	4.00	65.30	9	65.30	9
Joris van Springel	Bold Action	Individual	52.00	38	66.40	118.40	49	15.00	133.40	47	Did not advance			133.40	46

=== Show jumping ===
Athlete	Horse	Event	Qualification								Final					Total	
Athlete	Horse	Event	Round 1		Round 2			Round 3			Round A		Round B			Total	
Athlete	Horse	Event	Penalties	Rank	Penalties	Total	Rank	Penalties	Total	Rank	Penalties	Rank	Penalties	Total	Rank	Penalties	Rank
Jos Lansink	Cumano	Individual	1	=14 Q	1	2	4 Q	2	4	2 Q	0	=1 Q	8	8	=9	8	=9

== Field hockey ==
Belgium managed to qualify a team to the men's tournament. They won one, drew one, and lost three games in the group play. This qualified them to a match for 9th/10th place, which they won, finishing 9th for the tournament.

=== Men's tournament ===
Roster

The following is the Belgian roster in the men's field hockey tournament of the 2008 Summer Olympics.

Head Coach: Adam Commens

1. Cédric de Greve (GK)
2. Xavier Reckinger
4. Thierry Renaer
5. Jérôme Dekeyser
6. Loïc Vandeweghe (c)
7. John-John Dohmen
8. Thomas van den Balck
9. Maxime Luycx
10. Cédric Charlier
11. Charles Vandeweghe
14. Philippe Goldberg
15. Gregory Gucassoff
17. Thomas Briels
18. Patrice Houssein
19. Félix Denayer
28. Jérôme Truyens

Reserve:

21. David van Rysselberghe (GK)
23. Alexandre de Saedeleer

Group play

Pos	Team	Pld	W	D	L	GF	GA	GD	Pts	Qualification
1	Spain	5	4	0	1	9	5	+4	12	Semi-finals
2	Germany	5	3	2	0	12	6	+6	11	Semi-finals
3	South Korea	5	2	1	2	13	11	+2	7	Fifth place game
4	New Zealand	5	2	1	2	10	9	+1	7	Seventh place game
5	Belgium	5	1	1	3	9	13	−4	4	Ninth place game
6	China (H)	5	0	1	4	7	16	−9	1	Eleventh place game

(H) Hosts

11 August 2008
20:30

Spain	4–2	Belgium
Amat 8'; Freixa 20'; Ribas 41'; Sojo 49'	Report	Truyens 26'; Dekeyser 63'

Umpires:
Murray Grime (AUS)
Roel van Eert (NED)

13 August 2008
18:30

Belgium	1–1	Germany
Charlier 22'	Report	Witthaus 19'

Umpires:
Rob ten Cate (NED)
David Gentles (AUS)

15 August 2008
18:00

Belgium	2–4	New Zealand
Dekeyser 43'; Gucassoff 69'	Report	Child 19', 20'; Brooks 30'; McAleese 60'

Umpires:
David Leiper (GBR)
Xavier Adell (ESP)

17 August 2008
10:30

South Korea	3–1	Belgium
You Hyo-sik 46', 51'; Jang Jong-hyun 50'	Report	Dekeyser 20'

Umpires:
Rob ten Cate (NED)
Satinder Kumar (IND)

19 August 2008
21:00

China	1–3	Belgium
Song Yi 4'	Report	Reckinger 28'; Truyens 32'; Dohmen 48'

Umpires:
Murray Grime (AUS)
Gary Simmonds (RSA)

9th–10th place

21 August 2008
08:30

Belgium	3–0	Canada
Dekeyser 2', 70'; Dohmen 23'	Report

Umpires:
David Leiper (GBR)
Xavier Adell (ESP)

== Football ==
=== Men's tournament ===
Roster

The following is the Belgium squad in the men's football tournament of the 2008 Summer Olympics.

Head coach: Jean-François De Sart

No.	Pos.	Player	Date of birth (age)	Caps	Goals	Club
1	GK	Logan Bailly	27 December 1985 (aged 22)	13	0	(Royal Belgian Football Association) Racing Genk
2	DF	Sepp De Roover*	12 November 1984 (aged 23)	7	0	(Royal Dutch Football Association) Groningen
3	DF	Vincent Kompany	10 April 1986 (aged 22)	1	0	(German Football Association) Hamburger SV
4	DF	Thomas Vermaelen	14 November 1985 (aged 22)	16	1	(Royal Dutch Football Association) Ajax
5	DF	Sébastien Pocognoli	1 August 1987 (aged 21)	19	1	(Royal Dutch Football Association) AZ
6	MF	Marouane Fellaini	22 November 1987 (aged 20)	10	0	(Royal Belgian Football Association) Standard Liège
7	FW	Tom De Mul	4 March 1986 (aged 22)	32	5	(Royal Spanish Football Federation) Sevilla
8	MF	Faris Haroun	22 September 1985 (aged 22)	30	5	(Royal Belgian Football Association) Racing Genk
9	FW	Kevin Mirallas	5 October 1987 (aged 20)	12	6	(French Football Federation) Lille
10	MF	Jan Vertonghen	24 April 1987 (aged 21)	6	0	(Royal Dutch Football Association) Ajax
11	MF	Maarten Martens* (c)	2 July 1984 (aged 24)	32	8	(Royal Dutch Football Association) AZ
12	GK	Yves Ma-Kalambay	31 January 1986 (aged 22)	9	0	(Scottish Football Association) Hibernian
13	DF	Laurent Ciman	5 August 1985 (aged 23)	22	1	(Royal Belgian Football Association) Club Brugge
14	MF	Landry Mulemo	17 September 1986 (aged 21)	18	0	(Royal Belgian Football Association) Standard Liège
15	DF	Jeroen Simaeys	12 May 1985 (aged 23)	3	0	(Royal Belgian Football Association) Club Brugge
16	MF	Anthony Vanden Borre	24 October 1987 (aged 20)	15	2	(Italian Football Federation) Genoa
17	FW	Stijn De Smet	27 March 1985 (aged 23)	25	3	(Royal Belgian Football Association) Cercle Brugge
18	FW	Mousa Dembélé	16 July 1987 (aged 21)	2	0	(Royal Dutch Football Association) AZ
19	MF	Vadis Odjidja-Ofoe (Note: Replaces Stijn De Smet who was injured during the competition)	2 February 1989 (aged 19)	3	0	(German Football Association) Hamburger SV
22	GK	Yves De Winter (Note: Replaces Vincent Kompany who was returned to his club during the competition)	25 May 1987 (aged 21)	6	0	(Royal Belgian Football Association) Westerlo

* Over-aged player.

Notes

Group play

Pos	Team	Pld	W	D	L	GF	GA	GD	Pts	Qualification
1	Brazil	3	3	0	0	9	0	+9	9	Qualified for the quarterfinals
2	Belgium	3	2	0	1	3	1	+2	6	Qualified for the quarterfinals
3	China (H)	3	0	1	2	1	6	−5	1	
4	New Zealand	3	0	1	2	1	7	−6	1	

(H) Hosts
7 August 2008
17:00

Brazil	1–0	Belgium
Hernanes 79'	Report

Shenyang Olympic Stadium, Shenyang
Attendance: 39,661
Referee: Khalil Al Ghamdi (Saudi Arabia)
10 August 2008
19:45

Belgium	2–0	China
Dembélé 8'; Mirallas 80'	Report

Shenyang Olympic Stadium, Shenyang
Attendance: 45,756
Referee: Héctor Baldassi (Argentina)
13 August 2008
19:45

New Zealand	0–1	Belgium
	Report	Haroun 35'

Shanghai Stadium, Shanghai
Attendance: 45,202
Referee: Pablo Pozo (Chile)

Quarterfinal

16 August 2008
18:00

Italy	2–3	Belgium
Rossi 18' (pen.), 74' (pen.)	Report	Dembélé 23', 79'; Mirallas 45+2'

Beijing Workers' Stadium, Beijing
Attendance: 50,802
Referee: Héctor Baldassi (Argentina)

Semifinal

19 August 2008
18:00

Nigeria	4–1	Belgium
Adefemi 17'; Obasi 59', 72'; Okonkwo 78'	Report	Ciman 88'

Shanghai Stadium, Shanghai
Attendance: 56,312
Referee: Pablo Pozo (Chile)

Bronze medal game

22 August 2008
19:00

Belgium	0–3	Brazil (bronze)
	Report	Diego 27'; Jô 45', 90+2'

Shanghai Stadium, Shanghai
Attendance: 50,705
Referee: Thomas Einwaller (Austria)

== Gymnastics ==
=== Artistic ===
Men

Athlete	Event	Qualification								Final							
Athlete	Event	Apparatus						Total	Rank	Apparatus						Total	Rank
Athlete	Event	F	PH	R	V	PB	HB	Total	Rank	F	PH	R	V	PB	HB	Total	Rank
Koen van Damme	All-around	12.575	14.200	14.325	14.450	14.600	14.475	84.625	43	Did not advance							

Women

Athlete	Event	Qualification						Final					
Athlete	Event	Apparatus				Total	Rank	Apparatus				Total	Rank
Athlete	Event	F	V	UB	BB	Total	Rank	F	V	UB	BB	Total	Rank
Gaëlle Mys	All-around	14.125	14.050	14.175	14.800	57.150	31 Q	13.975	14.000	12.875	13.100	53.950	24

== Judo ==
Men

Athlete	Event	Preliminary	Round of 32	Round of 16	Quarterfinals	Semifinals	Repechage 1	Repechage 2	Repechage 3	Final / BM	
Athlete	Event	Opposition Result	Opposition Result	Opposition Result	Opposition Result	Opposition Result	Opposition Result	Opposition Result	Opposition Result	Opposition Result	Rank
Dirk van Tichelt	−73 kg	Bye	Mammadli (AZE); L 0000–1000	Did not advance			Siamionau (BLR); W 1021–0020	Kim C-S (PRK); W 1011–0000	Kanamaru (JPN); W 0211–0000	Boqiev (TJK); L 0000–0011	5

Women

Athlete	Event	Round of 32	Round of 16	Quarterfinals	Semifinals	Repechage 1	Repechage 2	Repechage 3	Final / BM	
Athlete	Event	Opposition Result	Opposition Result	Opposition Result	Opposition Result	Opposition Result	Opposition Result	Opposition Result	Opposition Result	Rank
Ilse Heylen	−52 kg	La Rizza (FRA); W 0001–0000	Ryder (AUS); W 1000–0000	Nakamura (JPN); L 0000–0001	Did not advance	Bye	Tarangul (GER); W 0002–0000	Kaliyeva (KAZ); L 0000–1000	Did not advance	
Catherine Jacques	−70 kg	Bye	Scapin (ITA); L 0000–0010	Did not advance						

== Rowing ==
Men

Athlete	Event	Heats		Repechage		Quarterfinals		Semifinals		Final	
Athlete	Event	Time	Rank	Time	Rank	Time	Rank	Time	Rank	Time	Rank
Tim Maeyens	Single sculls	7:16.60	1 QF	—N/a		6:52:70	2 SA/B	6:59:65	3 FA	7:03:40	4
Bart Poelvoorde; Christophe Raes	Double sculls	6:31.84	4 R	6:24:01	2 SA/B	—N/a		6:29:91	5 FB	6:35:55	8

Qualification Legend: FA=Final A (medal); FB=Final B (non-medal); FC=Final C (non-medal); FD=Final D (non-medal); FE=Final E (non-medal); FF=Final F (non-medal); SA/B=Semifinals A/B; SC/D=Semifinals C/D; SE/F=Semifinals E/F; QF=Quarterfinals; R=Repechage

== Sailing ==
Women

Athlete	Event	Race											Net points	Final rank
Athlete	Event	1	2	3	4	5	6	7	8	9	10	M*	Net points	Final rank
Evi van Acker	Laser Radial	1	10	16	10	12	6	12	4	~~18~~	CAN	10	91	8

Open

Athlete	Event	Race											Net points	Final rank
Athlete	Event	1	2	3	4	5	6	7	8	9	10	M*	Net points	Final rank
Carolijn Brouwer; Sébastien Godefroid	Tornado	11	11	5	6	3	8	13	6	~~16~~	9	EL	72	12

M = Medal race; EL = Eliminated – did not advance into the medal race

== Swimming ==
Men

Athlete	Event	Heat		Semifinal		Final	
Athlete	Event	Time	Rank	Time	Rank	Time	Rank
Mathieu Fonteyn	200 m butterfly	1:56.65 NR	19	Did not advance			
Yoris Grandjean	50 m freestyle	22.45 NR	28	Did not advance			
Yoris Grandjean	100 m freestyle	48.82 NR	19	Did not advance			
François Heersbrandt	100 m butterfly	53.33	37	Did not advance			
Brian Ryckeman	10 km open water	—N/a				1:52.10	7
Glenn Surgeloose	200 m freestyle	1:48.92 NR	30	Did not advance			
Tom Vangeneugden	1500 m freestyle	15:11.04 NR	20	—N/a		Did not advance	

Women

Athlete	Event	Heat		Semifinal		Final	
Athlete	Event	Time	Rank	Time	Rank	Time	Rank
Elise Matthysen	100 m breaststroke	1:08.37 NR	16 Q	1:09.00	13	Did not advance	
Elise Matthysen	200 m breaststroke	2:27.04 NR	15 Q	2:29.64	16	Did not advance	

== Table tennis ==
Athlete	Event	Preliminary round	Round 1	Round 2	Round 3	Round 4	Quarterfinals	Semifinals	Final / BM	
Athlete	Event	Opposition Result	Opposition Result	Opposition Result	Opposition Result	Opposition Result	Opposition Result	Opposition Result	Opposition Result	Rank
Jean-Michel Saive	Men's singles	Bye		Toriola (NGR); L 2–4	Did not advance					

== Tennis ==
Men

Athlete	Event	Round of 64	Round of 32	Round of 16	Quarterfinals	Semifinals	Final / BM	
Athlete	Event	Opposition Score	Opposition Score	Opposition Score	Opposition Score	Opposition Score	Opposition Score	Rank
Steve Darcis	Men's singles	Massú (CHI); L 4–6, 5–7	Did not advance					
Olivier Rochus	Men's singles	Minář (CZE); W 6–3, 3–6, 6–3	Tipsarević (SRB); W 7–6^{(7–5)}, 2–3^{r}	González (CHI); L 0–6, 3–6	Did not advance			
Steve Darcis; Olivier Rochus	Men's doubles	—N/a	Cañas / Nalbandian (ARG); W 6–7^{(6–8)}, 7–6^{(7–5)}, 6–3	Andreev / Davydenko (RUS); L 6–7^{(6–8)}, 2–6	Did not advance			

== Triathlon ==
Athlete	Event	Swim (1.5 km)	Trans 1	Bike (40 km)	Trans 2	Run (10 km)	Total Time	Rank
Peter Croes	Men's	18:26	0:26	58:51	0:32	33:25	1:51:40.94	27
Axel Zeebroek	Men's	18:30	0:27	57:48	0:30	33:15	1:50:30.90	13

== Volleyball ==
Athlete	Event	Preliminary round	Standing	Round of 16	Quarterfinals	Semifinals	Final / BM	
Athlete	Event	Opposition Score	Standing	Opposition Score	Opposition Score	Opposition Score	Opposition Score	Rank
Liesbeth Mouha; Liesbet van Breedam	Women's	Pool A Maaseide – Glesnes (NOR); L 0 – 2 (22–24, 18–21); Tian J – Wang J (CHN); L 1 – 2 (21–18, 19–21, 13–15); Kuhn – Schwer (SUI); W 2 – 0 (21–18, 21–17); Lucky Losers; Saka – Rtvelo (GEO); W 2 – 0 (21–13, 21–19)	3 Q	May-Treanor – Walsh (USA); L 0 – 2 (22–24, 10–21)	Did not advance			

== Weightlifting ==
Athlete	Event	Snatch		Clean & Jerk		Total	Rank
Athlete	Event	Result	Rank	Result	Rank	Total	Rank
Tom Goegebuer	Men's −56 kg	114	12	137	13	251	13

== See also ==
- Belgium at the 2008 Summer Paralympics
