= Yanakiev =

Yanakiev (Bulgarian: Янакиев) is a Bulgarian surname. Notable people with the surname include:

- Dimitar Yanakiev (born 1950), Bulgarian rower
- Ivo Yanakiev (born 1975), Bulgarian rower
- Martin Yanakiev (born 1983), Bulgarian rower
- Yavor Yanakiev (born 1985), Bulgarian wrestler
