= The Boat Race 2010 =

156th Boat Race
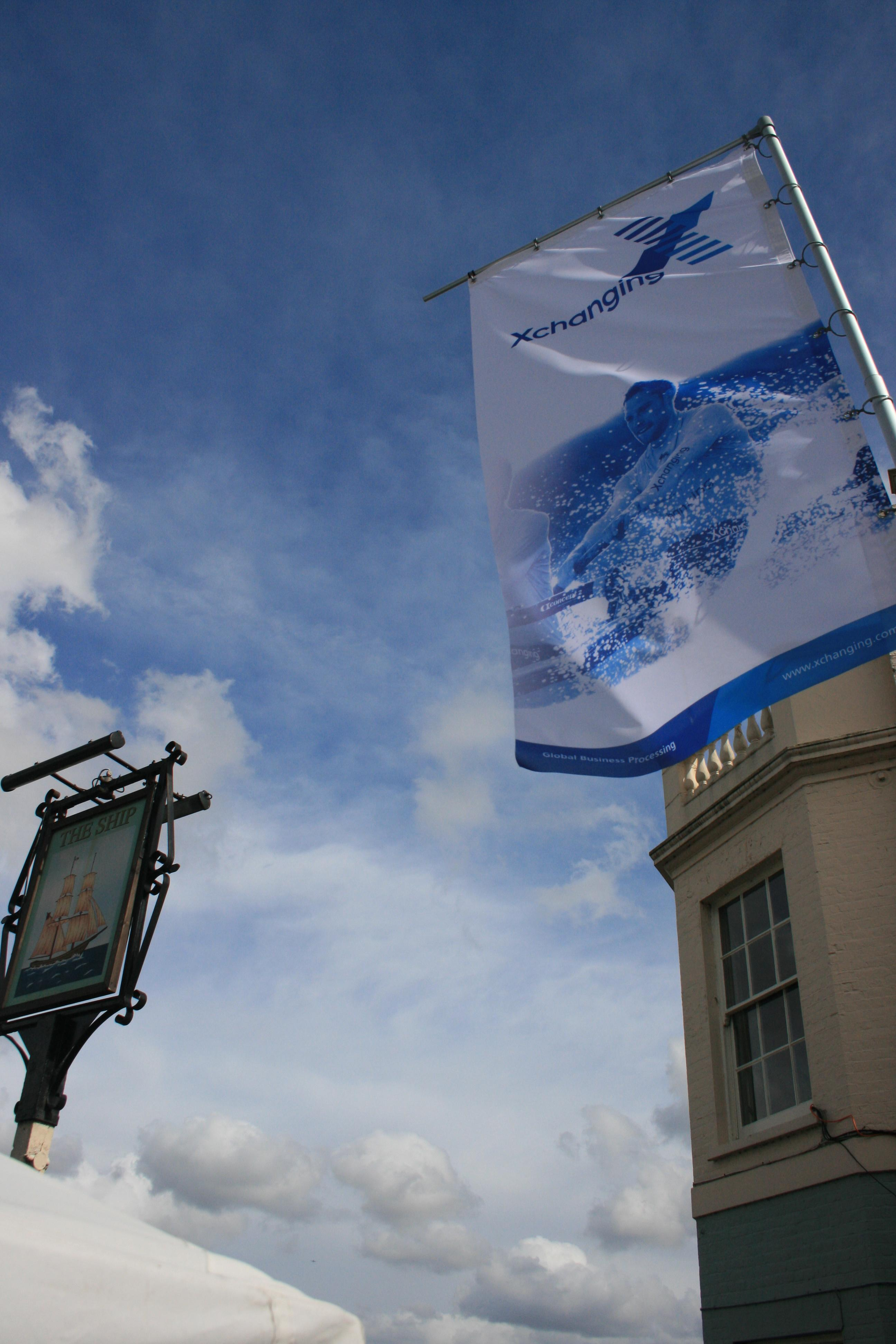
- Advertising banner for the 2010 Boat Race
- Date: 3 April 2010
- Winner: Cambridge
- Margin of victory: 1 1/3 lengths
- Winning time: 17 minutes 35 seconds
- Overall record (Cambridge–Oxford): 80–75
- Umpire: Simon Harris (Cambridge)

Other races
- Reserve winner: Goldie
- Women's winner: Oxford

The 156th Boat Race took place on 3 April 2010. Held annually, the event is a side-by-side rowing race between crews from the Universities of Oxford and Cambridge along the River Thames. The race was won by Cambridge. Of the eighteen competitors in the race, six were British. Of the non-British rowers, the Oxford crew featured the American Olympic finalists, the Winklevoss twins. It was the first time the race had a title sponsor; it was also known as the "Xchanging Boat Race", having been sponsored by Xchanging.

Oxford won the Women's Boat Race by four lengths while Cambridge's Goldie beat Oxford's Isis in the reserve race.

== Background ==
The Boat Race is a side-by-side rowing competition between the University of Oxford (sometimes referred to as the "Dark Blues") and the University of Cambridge (sometimes referred to as the "Light Blues"). First held in 1829, the race takes place on the 4.2-mile (6.8 km) Championship Course on the River Thames in southwest London. The rivalry is a major point of honour between the two universities and followed throughout the United Kingdom and broadcast worldwide. Oxford went into the race as reigning champions, having won the 2009 race by 3 1/2 lengths, while Cambridge led overall with 79 victories to Oxford's 75 (excluding the "dead heat" of 1877). The race was sponsored by Xchanging for the sixth consecutive year, but it was the first time in the 180-year history of the Boat Race that the title had been given over to sponsorship; as such it was referred to as the "Xchanging Boat Race".

Prior to the race, Oxford University Boat Club president and Dutch international rower Sjoerd Hamburger claimed "Last year we had an exceptional crew, power-wise, which we don't have this year, but we're starting to match the times we did last year, so I'm very pleased". His Cambridge counterpart, American Deaglan McEachern, responded: "we're faster". Umpire and former Cambridge Blue Simon Harris suggested that he did not anticipate any problems with the two coxes obeying his instructions: "I've been impressed by the coxes, how they've responded to the umpire's calls".

The first Women's Boat Race took place in 1927, but did not become an annual fixture until the 1960s. Up until 2014, the contest was conducted as part of the Henley Boat Races, but as of the 2015 race, it is held on the River Thames, on the same day as the men's main and reserve races. The reserve race, contested between Oxford's Isis boat and Cambridge's Goldie boat has been held since 1965. It usually takes place on the Tideway, prior to the main Boat Race.

== Crews ==
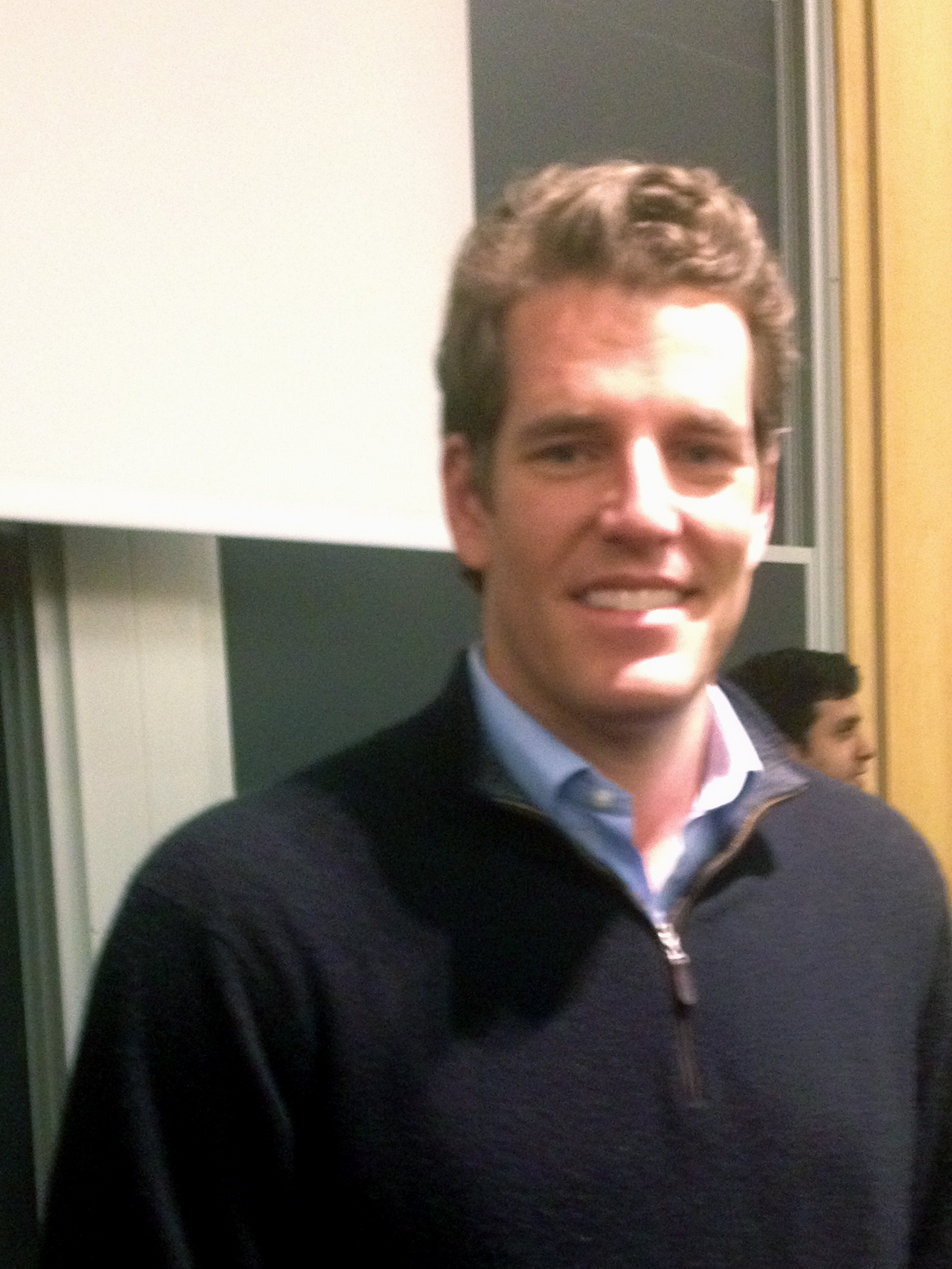
Tyler Winklevoss

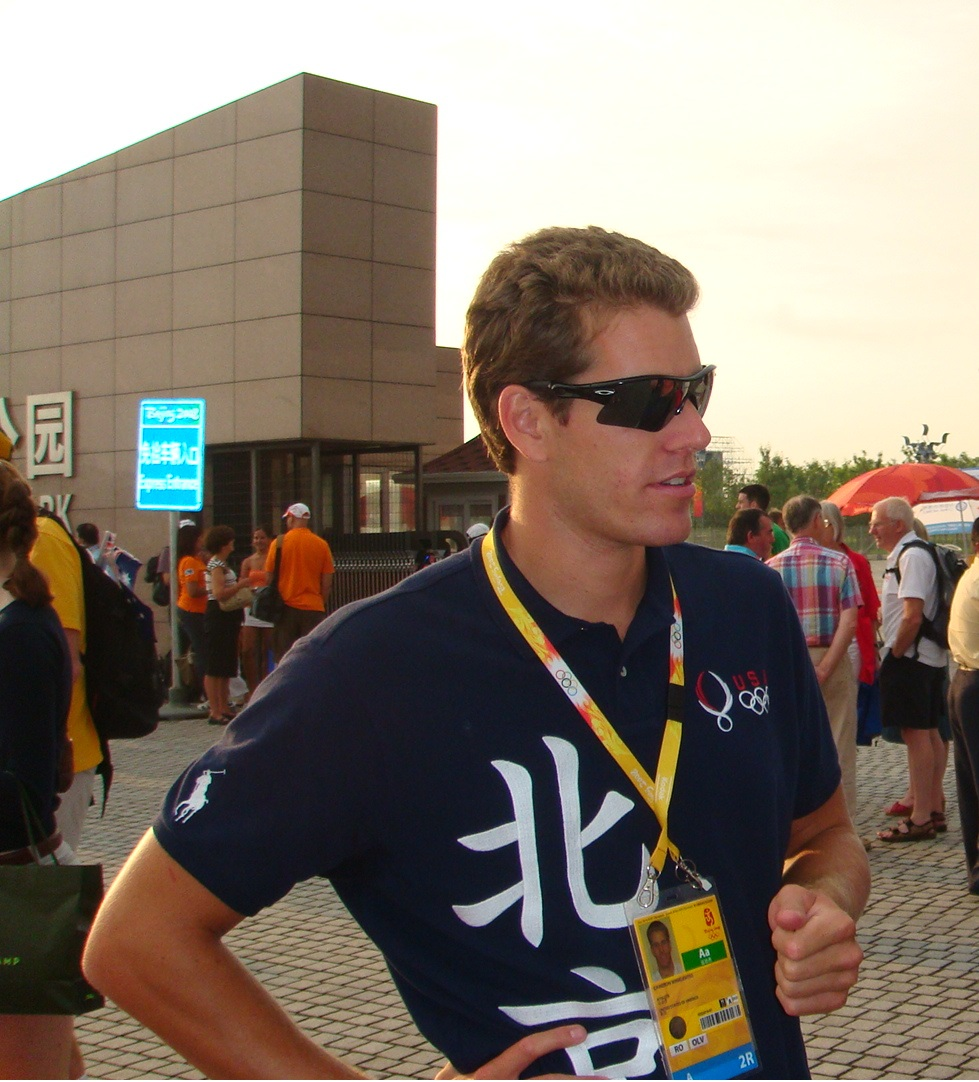
Cameron Winklevoss

Cambridge's crew weighed an average of 1 pound (0.45 kg) per rower more than Oxford. The Dark Blues were coached by Sean Bowden for the 13th time while the Light Blues saw Chris Nilsson act as chief coach for the second time. Cambridge's crew featured four Britons, three Americans and two Canadians, while Oxford's consisted of three Americans, two Britons, and rowers from Ireland, The Netherlands, Canada (dual nationality) and Germany. Oxford's crew included the Winklevoss twins (Cameron and Tyler), who rowed in the 2008 Olympic Games for the United States in the men's coxless pair. Cambridge's bowman, Canadian international rower Robert Weitemeyer, had won the gold in the men's eight at the World Rowing Cup in 2007.

Seat	Oxford			Cambridge		
Seat	Name	College	Nationality	Name	College	Nationality
Bow	Ben Myers	Exeter	British	Robert Weitemeyer	St. Edmund's	Canadian
2	Martin Walsh	Green Templeton	Irish	Geoff Roth	St. Edmund's	Canadian
3	Tyler Winklevoss	Christ Church	American	George Nash	Hughes Hall	British
4	Cameron Winklevoss	Christ Churc	American	Peter McClelland	Pembroke	Canadian
5	Sjoerd Hamburger (P)	Oriel	Dutch	Deaglan McEachern (P)	Hughes Hall	American
6	Matt Evans	University	Canadian/British	Henry Pelly	St. Edmund's	British
7	Simon Gawlick	Kellogg	German	Derek Rasmussen	St. Catharine's	American
Stroke	Charlie Burkitt	Wolfson	British	Fred Gill	Hughes Hall	British
Cox	Adam Barhamand	Wolfson	American	Ted Randolph	Peterhouse	British
Source: (P) – boat club president

== Race ==
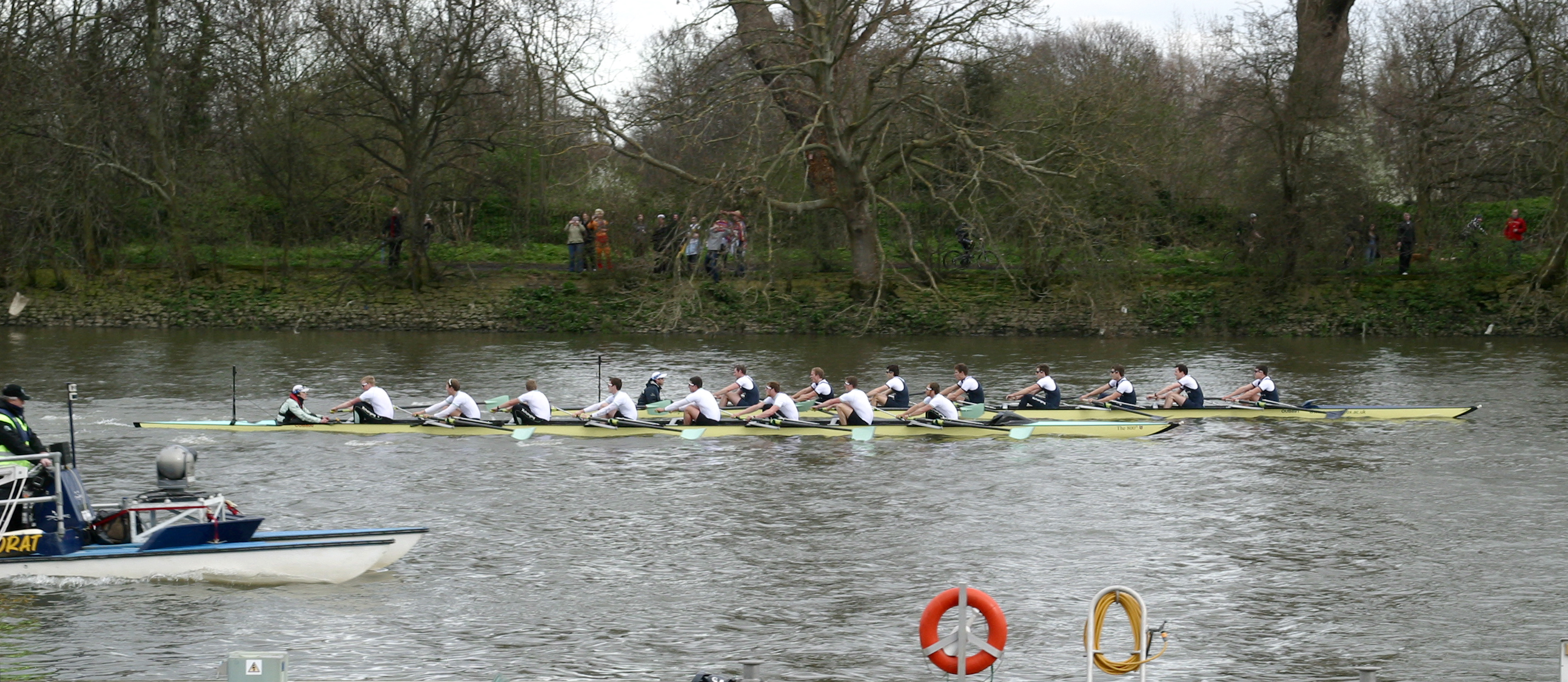
Cambridge passing Oxford at Chiswick Pier

Oxford were pre-race favourites, and won the toss, electing to start the race from the Surrey station. They took an early lead and were nearly half a length up on Cambridge by the time the crews passed the Harrods Furniture Depository. The boats closed in on one another and umpire Harris was forced to issue a number of warnings to both coxes as the crews came close to clashing oars. The Light Blues pulled themselves back into contention around the Chiswick Reach and took the lead into Corney Reach. Oxford attempted to find a quicker racing line and were still in touch, but Cambridge inched away from them, passing the finishing post 1 1/3 lengths ahead in a time of 17 minutes 35 seconds.

Oxford won the 65th Women's Boat Race by four lengths, their third consecutive victory. Cambridge's Goldie beat Oxford's Isis in the reserve race by two lengths, their first win in three years.

== Reaction ==
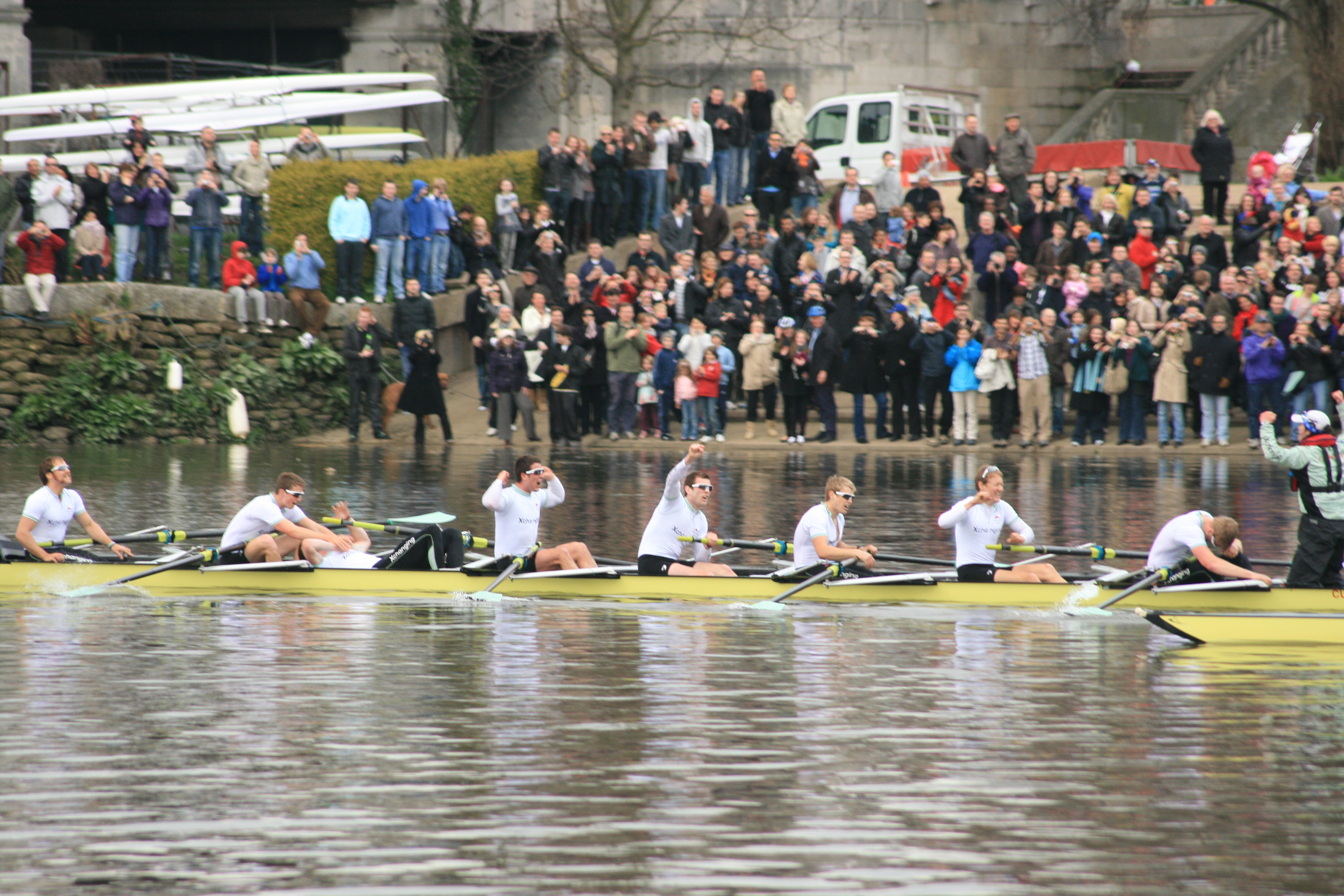
The Cambridge crew moments after securing their first victory in three years

Cambridge cox Randolph exclaimed "The whole way through I was thinking: 'We could win it, we could win it, we could win it". Race umpire Simon Harris declared "it was a fantastic race". Olympic medallist Steve Redgrave remarked "All credit to Oxford ... but all the way from the bend on there was only going to be one winner. It just took Cambridge a little while before they believed it was going to happen."
