= The Boat Race 2009 =

155th Boat Race
- Date: 29 March 2009
- Winner: Oxford
- Margin of victory: 3 1/2 lengths
- Winning time: 17 minutes 35 seconds
- Overall record (Cambridge–Oxford): 79–75
- Umpire: Boris Rankov (Oxford)

Other races
- Reserve winner: Goldie
- Women's winner: Oxford

The 155th Boat Race took place on 29 March 2009. Oxford's crew was the heaviest in the event's history and which featured five Olympic rowers, including silver medallist Colin Smith and bronze medallist George Bridgewater. Cambridge took an early lead, only to be caught and overtaken by Oxford, who won the race by 3 1/2 lengths.

In the reserve race, Cambridge's Goldie defeated Oxford's Isis, while Oxford won the Women's Boat Race.

== Background ==
The Boat Race is an annual competition between the University of Oxford and the University of Cambridge. First held in 1829, the competition is a 4.2-mile (6.8 km) race along The Championship Course on the River Thames in southwest London. The rivalry is a major point of honour between the two universities and followed throughout the United Kingdom and worldwide. Oxford went into the race as reigning champions, having won the 2008 race by six lengths, while Cambridge led overall with 79 victories to Oxford's 74 (excluding the "dead heat" of 1877). The race was sponsored by Xchanging for the fifth consecutive year.

The first Women's Boat Race took place in 1927, but did not become an annual fixture until the 1960s. Up until 2014, the contest was conducted as part of the Henley Boat Races, but as of the 2015 race, it is held on the River Thames, on the same day as the men's main and reserve races. The reserve race, contested between Oxford's Isis boat and Cambridge's Goldie boat has been held since 1965. It usually takes place on the Tideway, prior to the main Boat Race.

== Crews ==
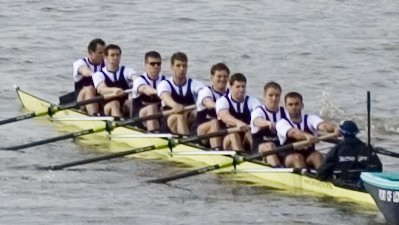
Oxford crew at the start

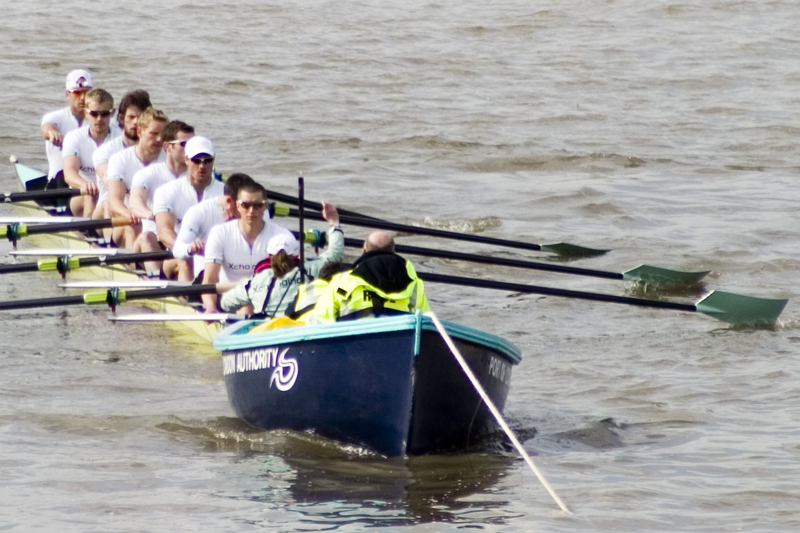
Cambridge crew at the start (cox Dowbiggin has her hand raised to indicate she and her crew are not ready to start)

The Oxford crew (sometimes referred to as the "Dark Blues") weighed an average of 8 pounds (3.6 kg) per rower more than the Cambridge crew (sometimes referred to as the "Light Blues"), making them the heaviest in Boat Race history. Oxford fielded five rowers who had featured at the 2008 Summer Olympics: Colin Smith won silver for Great Britain, while Ante Kušurin rowed for Croatia, New Zealander George Bridgewater won a bronze in the coxless pair, Sjoerd Hamburger rowed for The Netherlands, and Tom Solesbury for Great Britain. Cambridge's crew contained five returning Blues to Oxford's three.

Seat	Oxford				Cambridge			
Seat	Name	College	Nationality	Age	Name	College	Nationality	Age
Bow	Michal Plotkowiak	Brasenose	Polish	27	Rob Weitemeyer	St Edmund's	Canadian	26
2	Colin Smith (P)	St Catherine's	British	24	Henry Pelly (P)	St Edmund's	British	25
3	Alexander Hearne	Trinity	American	25	Deaglan McEachern	Hughes Hall	American	25
4	Benjamin Harrison	Christ Church	American	23	Peter Marsland	Peterhouse	British	24
5	Sjoerd Hamburger	St Cross	Dutch	26	Ryan Monaghan	St Edmund's	American	24
6	Tom Solesbury	University	British	28	Hardy Cubasch	St Edmund's	Australian	28
7	George Bridgewater	Oriel	New Zealander	26	Tom Ransley	Hughes Hall	British	23
Stroke	Ante Kušurin	Kellogg	Croatian	25	Silas Stafford	Gonville	American	22
Cox	Colin Groshong	St Catherine's	American	24	Rebecca Dowbiggin	Emmanuel	British	25
Source: (P) – boat club president

== Race ==
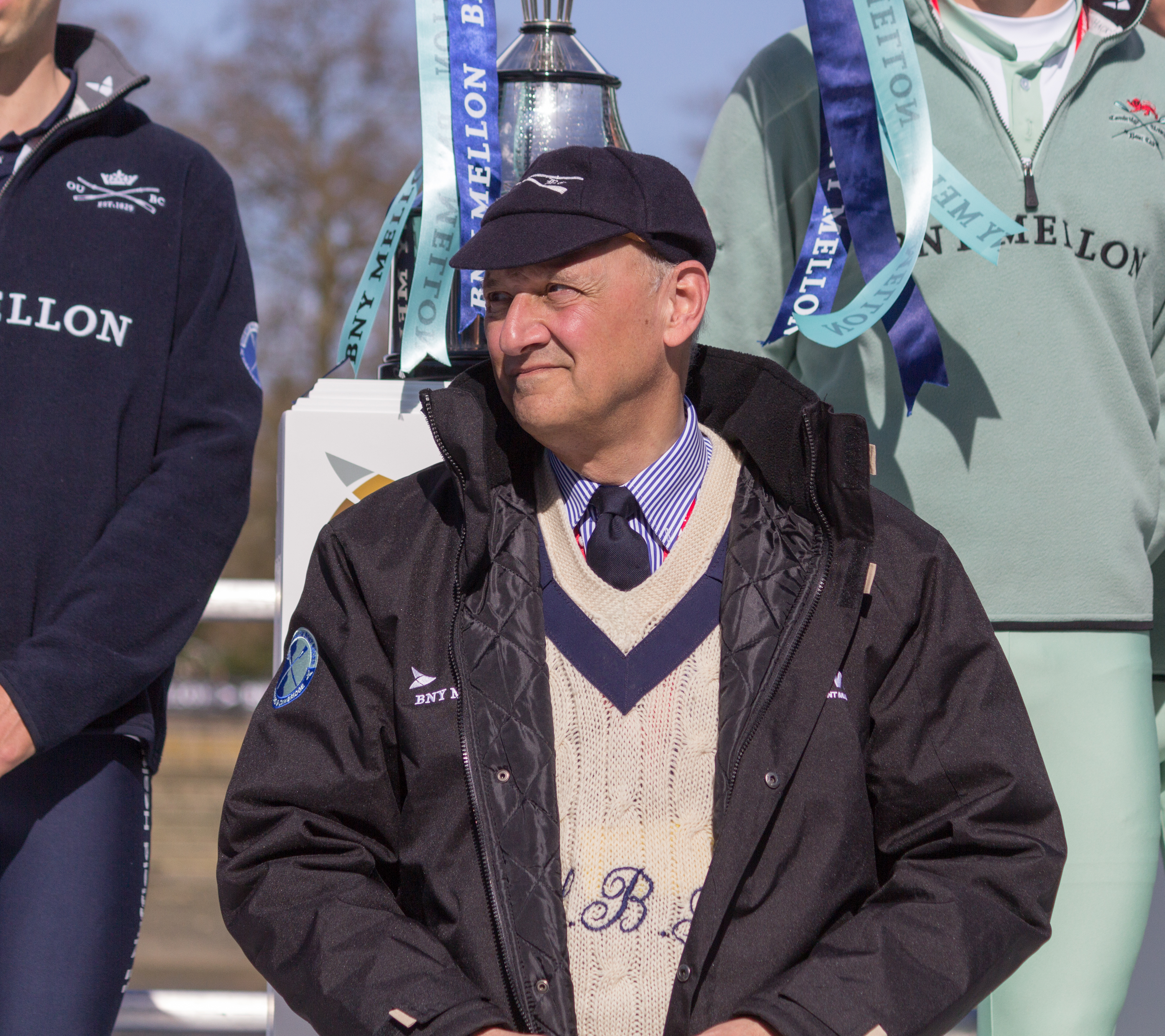
Boris Rankov (pictured in 2015) was the race umpire.

Cambridge won the toss and elected to start from the Surrey station. Cambridge's cox Dowbiggin raised her hand to indicate that she was not ready to start just as Umpire Boris Rankov started the race. This allowed Oxford the initiative and they took an early lead. Cambridge slowly edged their way back into contention, and held a half-a-length lead at the two-mile mark. At St Paul's School, Cambridge were two-thirds of a length ahead before a series of oar clashes and umpire warnings forced the boats apart. A larger clash, between Cambridge's Monaghan and Oxford's Smith, took place by Chiswick Eyot before Oxford made the better recovery and quickly pushed out to secure a clear-water lead. Cambridge failed to threaten, and Oxford won by 3 1/2 lengths.

In the reserve race, Isis defeated Goldie by four lengths, completing the race in a time of 17 minutes 24 seconds, for their second consecutive win. Oxford won the Women's Boat Race by 1 1/4 lengths, hosted at Henley on 22 March 2014.

== Reaction ==
Oxford's boat club president Colin Smith said "it's a great, great feeling". He continued: "The difference between the two crews today was our power, aggression and stickability". Cambridge's Australian international Cubasch said "it's really devastating. Sometimes you'd be happy with a silver but here it's dead last." His coach, Chris Nilsson, admitted "at the end of the day, the stronger crew with the more power came through". Oxford coach Sean Bowden said "We just said 'get to halfway, and head for home’, and they did a really good job".
