= Matthew Wells (rower) =

British rower

Matt Wells
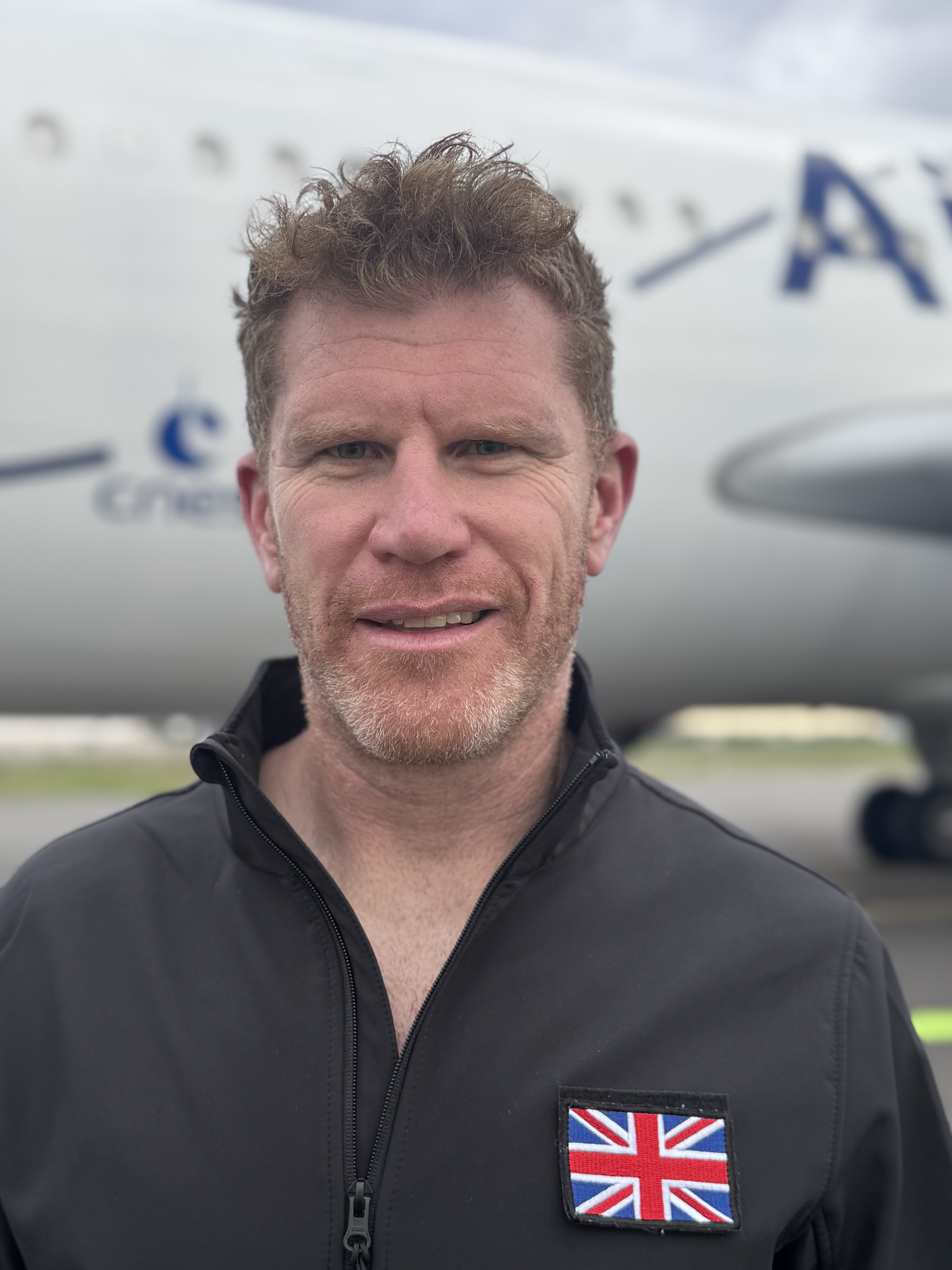
- Wells in 2026

Personal information
- Full name: Matthew Ward Wells
- Nationality: British
- Born: 19 April 1979 (age 47) Bradford, England
- Home town: Combe Down, England
- Height: 191 cm (6 ft 3 in)
- Weight: 92 kg (203 lb)

Sport
- Country: United Kingdom
- Sport: Men's rowing
- Event: Double Sculls
- Club: Leander Club
Medal record
Men's rowing
Representing Great Britain
Olympic Games
Bronze medal – third place	2008 Beijing	Double sculls
World Rowing Championships
Silver medal – second place	2010 Karapiro	Double Sculls
Bronze medal – third place	2006 Eton	Double Sculls

Matthew Ward "Matt" Wells (born 19 April 1979) is a British Olympic rower. He has competed in multiple Olympic Games and World Championships, and won a bronze medal at the 2008 Summer Olympics.

== Biography ==
Matthew Wells was born in Bradford and grew up in Hexham, where he learnt to row on the River Tyne as a pupil at Queen Elizabeth High School.

In 1996 he won the Single sculls at the Coupe de la Jeunesse, and won gold in the Double sculls at the World Rowing Junior Championships in 1997. He took bronze at the World Under 23 Rowing Championships in 1999, after missing out on competition for a year due to injury.

In 2000, he took gold in the Single sculls at the World Under 23 Rowing Championships, then represented Great Britain at the 2000 Summer Olympics, finishing in ninth place.

In 2003, Wells came fifth in the World Rowing Championships in Milan in the men's Double sculls with Ian Lawson. In 2004, he competed at the 2004 Summer Olympics with Matt Langridge in the men's Double sculls, narrowly missing out on the final but winning the B final to finish eighth overall.

Transferring to the Quad sculls in 2005, he won a bronze in the World Rowing Cup at Lucerne, the first world-level medal ever to be won by a GB men's quad. This crew went on to finish 7th in the World Rowing Championships.

Wells then returned to the Double sculls, claiming bronze at the 2006 World Championships held at Dorney Lake, Eton, UK, but finished fourth in 2007. At the 2008 Olympics in Beijing, Wells and Stephen Rowbotham took Britain's first men's Olympic sculling medal since 1976, winning bronze in the men's Double sculls. At the 2012 Summer Olympics he was part of the British quadruple sculls team that finished 5th.

Wells was appointed as Director of Rowing at Monkton Combe School, near Bath in 2012. In September 2018 he took up the post of Director of Rowing at Bedford Girls School. In September 2019 he took up the post of Head of Physical Education Faculty at Kings of Wessex Academy, Cheddar. He has helped to develop young athletes into national superstars.
