= Ante Kušurin =

Croatian rower

Personal information
- Nationality: Croatian
- Born: 9 June 1983 (age 43) Nova Gradiška, SR Croatia; SFR Yugoslavia
- Height: 1.88 m (6 ft 2 in)
- Weight: 94 kg (207 lb)

Sport
- Sport: Rowing
- Club: Oxford University Boat Club (GBR)
- Team: Washington Huskies (USA)
- Coached by: Dragutin Milinkovic (national); Kresimir Petrovic

Ante Kušurin (born 9 June 1983) is a Croatian rower, who specialized in the double scull event. He is a two-time medalist at the World Junior Rowing Championships and also a member of the Oxford Blue.

== Rowing career ==
Kusurin started out his sporting career as a basketball player, until he encouraged by his friends to try out for rowing at the age of fourteen. He won two medals for the double sculls at the World Junior Rowing Championships, and also, attained multiple top-ten finishes at the World Under-23 Regatta and at the World Rowing Cup series.

Realizing that he needed funding and a full-time career, Kusurin applied for a full scholarship and took up a business degree in finance at the University of Washington in Seattle. While attending college, he discovered competitive rowing and power training, and suddenly became a full-fledged member of the Washington Huskies Rowing Club. He also served as the captain of the rowing team, and captured numerous gold medals for his collegiate crew at the Pac-10 Rowing Championships, the Windermere Cup, and the San Diego Crew Classic. Although he played for the Washington Huskies during his collegiate career, Kusurin continued to row in his national senior squad annually.

After graduating from the University of Washington in 2007, Kusurin attended the University of Oxford Saïd Business School, where he became a member of the Oxford University Boat Club. He participated twice in The Boat Race, in 2007 and 2009, along with top-class rowers including Great Britain's Colin Smith and New Zealand's George Bridgewater, an Olympic bronze medalist in the coxless pair.

== Olympics ==
Kusurin represented Croatia the 2008 Summer Olympics in Beijing, where he and his partner Mario Vekić competed for the men's double sculls. The pair directly qualified for the semi-final A/B rounds, after finishing second in the heats, with a time of 6:27.38. Shortly before the rowing competition, Kusurin and Vekic were involved in a bus accident, which killed three Chinese nationals and injured several Australian delegates and their coach Dragutin Milinkovic. While their coach was rushed to a nearby hospital around Beijing, the pair went off to the competition and rowed strongly for a fourth-place finish in the semi-final round, with a fastest possible time of 6:24.89.

Few hours later, Kusurin and Vekic missed out of the final B round, and automatically finished in twelfth overall position. The International Olympic Committee (IOC) and the International Rowing Federation (FISA) had also rejected an appeal sent by the Croatian Olympic Committee (HOO) to include the pair as a seventh scull in the final race.
