= David Crawshay =

Australian rower (born 1979)

Personal information
- Born: 11 August 1979 (age 47) Melbourne, Victoria
- Years active: 1994–2016

Sport
- Country: Australia
- Sport: Rowing
- Club: Mercantile Rowing Club
Medal record
Men's rowing
Representing Australia
Olympic Games
Gold medal – first place	2008 Beijing	Double sculls
World Championships
Silver medal – second place	2009 Poznań	Quad scull
Silver medal – second place	2015 Aiguebelette	Quad scull
Bronze medal – third place	2010 Karapiro	Quad scull
U23 World Championships
Silver medal – second place	2000 Copenhagen	Quad scull
Bronze medal – third place	2001 Linz	Quad scull

David William Crawshay OAM (born 11 August 1979) is an Australian former rower, an eleven-time national champion, an Olympic champion and medalist at World Championships. He represented Australia in rowing at three consecutive Olympic games from Athens 2004 to London 2012.

== Club and state rowing ==
Born in Carlton, Victoria, Crawshay attended Melbourne Grammar School. His senior rowing has been with the Mercantile Rowing Club based on the Yarra River in Melbourne.

Crawshay's first state selection as Victoria's single sculls representative to contest the President's Cup at the Interstate Regatta within the Australian Rowing Championships came in 2002. He then contested the President's Cup in 2003 and 2004. From 2007 he won each President's Cup he contested – 2007, 2009, 2010 and 2012. In 2013, 2014 and 2015 he rowed in the Victorian men's senior eight competing for the King's Cup at the Interstate Regatta. The 2015 crew were victorious. Crawshay was initially selected to represent Victoria in the President's Cup single scull at the 2016 Interstate Regatta, but following the announcement of his retirement from international competition he was replaced by Karsten Forsterling.

In Mercantile colours he contested the Australian open men's single sculls title at the Australian Rowing Championships on a number of occasions. He won that title in 2005, 2007, 2009, 2011, 2012 and he placed second in 2006 and 2010. Paired with Scott Brennan he won the open men's double scull championship in 2011.

== International representative rowing ==
=== World Championships ===
Crawshay made his Australian representative debut in 2000 at the World Rowing Cup III in Lucerne in a quad scull. That same year he competed at the World Rowing U23 Championships in an Australian quad which won silver. He raced again in 2001 at the U2 World Championships in a quad scull and won bronze. That same year Crawshay also competed in Australia's senior quad scull at the 2001 World Rowing Championships in Lucerne for a tenth-place finish.

In 2003 Crawshay was back in Australian representative crews rowing with Peter Hardcastle in the double scull at the World Rowing Cup III in Lucerne for a second placing and then at the 2003 World Rowing Championships in Milan to a sixth-place finish in the final. Following the 2004 Olympics Crawshay was in 2005 selected as Australia's single sculls representative at the 2005 World Rowing Championships in Gifu, Japan where he placed ninth overall. He regained his seat in the Australian quad scull in 2006 racing at two World Rowing Cups in Europe that year before contesting the 2006 World Rowing Championships at Eton Dorney where the quad placed ninth.

In 2007 Crawshay teamed with Tasmanian Scott Brennan in the Australian senior double scull and they commenced their 2008 Olympics campaign. They raced at two World Rowing Cups in Europe in 2007 and then the 2007 World Rowing Championships in Munich where they placed eight. They won bronze in 2008 at WRC I in Munich and WRC II in Lucerne before their successful run for gold at Beijing 2008.

At the 2009 World Rowing Championships in Poznań rowing with Nick Hudson, Jared Bidwell and Daniel Noonan in the Australian quad scull he won a silver medal. He held his seat in the Australian quad for the 2010 World Rowing Championships in Karapiro and rowing with Noonan and Karsten Forsterling, James McRae, the crew finished third and took the bronze medal.

In 2011 he again rowed with Scott Brennan in a double scull as they prepared for the Olympic year, they raced at the World Rowing Cup III in Lucerne to a seventh place and at the 2011 World Rowing Championships in Bled to a fourth placing. After London London 2012 Crawshay switched to sweep oared boats at the domestic level and was regained international selection in 2014 when he secured a seat in the Australian senior eight. He raced in the eight and a coxless four at the WRC I in Sydney; in the eight at WRC III in Lucerne and then he was in the two seat of the eight for the 2014 World Rowing Championships in Amsterdam where they missed a place in the A final and finished in overall seventh place.

In 2015, his final year of international representation Crawshay switched back to sculls and gained the bow seat in the Australian quad scull. With Cameron Girdlestone, Karsten Forsterling and David Watts at the 2015 World Rowing Championships on Lac d'Aiguebelette in Aiguebelette France they finished in second place winning a world championship silver medal. In March 2016, Crawshay announced his retirement from international rowing.

=== Olympics ===
Crawshay's first Australian Olympic selection was for the 2004 Athens when he was selected in the Australian quad scull with Scott Brennan, Duncan Free and Shaun Coulton. They arrived at the Olympic Games as favourites, having won the World Cup in Lucerne. They qualified in the heat for the semi-final despite a crab early in the race. In the semi-final they started well enough but could not maintain the same boat speed as their competitors in the second five hundred. In the end they were in fourth place at every 500m mark and missed the final. In the B final they had to defeat the Sydney gold medallists Italy and the fancied Swiss and Estonians. They broke free of Italy with 650m to go and then held off the fast finishing Swiss and Estonian crews. They had sufficient reserves to hold off the final challenges to win the B final ending the regatta in seventh place.

With unfinished business from Athens, Crawshay teamed up again with Scott Brennan in the men's double sculls for the 2008 Summer Olympics in Beijing, China. They rowed perfect races in the heat, semi final and final to finish with a gold medal and an Olympic championship.

Brennan and Crawshay teamed up again for 2012 London. They finished second in the B final for an overall eighth place in the 2012 Olympic rankings.
