= Scott Brennan (rower) =

Australian rower

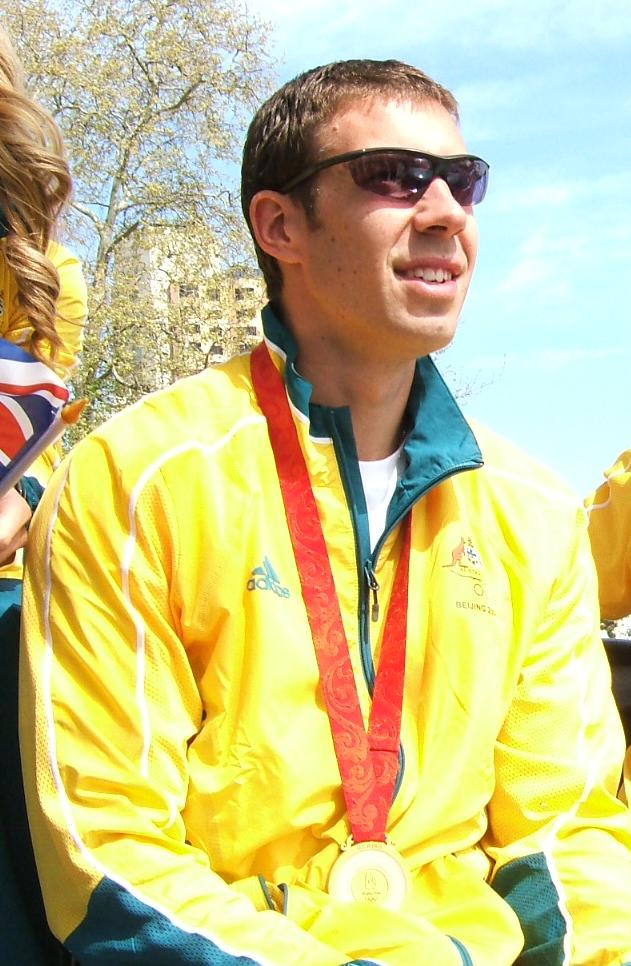

Personal information
- Born: 9 January 1983 (age 43) Hobart, Tasmania, Australia
- Height: 193 cm (76 in)
- Weight: 90 kg (198 lb)

Sport
- Country: Australia
- Sport: Rowing
- Club: Lindisfarne Rowing Club
Medal record
Representing Australia
Men's rowing
Gold medal – first place	2008 Beijing	Double sculls

Scott Michael Brennan OAM (born 9 January 1983) is an Australian Olympic gold medal-winning and national champion rower from Hobart, Tasmania. He has represented for Australia in rowing at three consecutive Olympic games.

== Personal ==
Born in Hobart, Tasmania, Brennan took up rowing in 1995 whilst at St Virgil's College in Hobart, where he eventually became captain of the school in 1998. He continued his rowing through Guilford Young College for years 11 and 12 of his schooling and again became captain of the school in 2000. He studied medicine at the University of Tasmania and graduated in 2007 with honours. He married Olympic single scull rowing gold medallist Kim Crow in Hobart, Tasmania on 30 December 2015. In January 2018, it was announced that the couple were expecting their first child. Their son, Jude, was born later that year.

== Rowing career ==
At the junior world representative level Brennan won silver in the single scull at the 2001 Junior World Championship and became the first Australian to have won gold in the single scull at the 2003 U/23 World Championship. At the 2004 rowing World Cup he won gold in the quad scull. Along with his longtime rowing partner David Crawshay Brennan has won numerous national titles in all sculling classes at the Australian Rowing Championships.

Brennan's first Australian Olympic selection was for Athens 2004 when he rowed in the Australian quad scull who won their B final. With David Crawshay, Brennan won the gold medal in the men's double sculls at the 2008 Summer Olympics in Beijing, China. In March 2012 Brennan was selected to defend his Olympic title in the men's Double Scull with Beijing Crawshay at the 2012 Summer Olympics. After a promising start to the campaign with a silver medal in the Lucerne World Cup, Brennan suffered a back injury immediately prior to the games but raced regardless, finishing in second place in the B final for an overall eighth place in the 2012 Olympic rankings. Brennan was unable to recover from this injury despite two years of intensive rehab and retired from the sport in 2015 to pursue a career in medicine.

He leads an active community life outside of medicine and rowing and is a volunteer with Camp Quality.
