= Sjoerd Hamburger =

Dutch rower

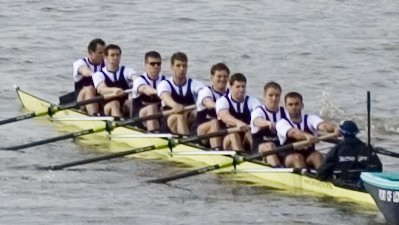
Hamburger rowed in the 2009 Boat Race. This takes place each year between Oxford and Cambridge universities

Sjoerd Hamburger (born 8 February 1983 in Oldeberkoop) is a rower from the Netherlands, who competes in the single scull.

Hamburger was born and raised in Oldeberkoop, where he played korfball and was involved in training for triathlons. When he was 18 he moved to Utrecht to study and started rowing in an eight at the Orca Rowing Club. The boat took silver at the European Youth Championships that year. In 2003 Hamburger rowed in the Orca coxed four which came sixth at the World Under-23 Rowing Championships. On the advice of his coach Peter van der Noort, he started training in the single scull and thanks to a successful performance at his national championships he was selected to take part in the World Cup. At the end of the year Hamburger won the bronze medal at the Under-23 World Championships. In December 2004 he was nominated alongside Meindert Klem and Eva Duldig de Jong as a Netherlands Talent Athlete. Later that month he became European Ergometer Champion.

In March 2005 Hamburger won in an annual award as the Netherlands most talented (current) athlete. During the World Cup finals in Luzern (Lucerne) he finished sixth, at the semi-final stage of which he broke his national record to scull 2000 metres in 6:46.32. Two weeks later Hamburger became World Under-23 Champion in Amsterdam.

At the World Championships in Japan in September he reached 7th position, winning the B-final. In 2006 Hamburger achieved 8th position in the world, and managed to beat his own national record. During the first World Cup meeting of 2007 he came sixth in Linz. He followed this with a 7th position at the second World Cup in Amsterdam. Thanks to a fifth position in the World Cup finals in Luzern Hamburger earned nomination for the 2008 Summer Olympics in Beijing. The first World Cup of 2008 led to 8th place in Munich. This was followed by a 7th place in the second World Cup in Luzern then training camp in South Korea – for the 2008 Summer Olympics in Beijing.

Hamburger was also a member of 2009's winning Oxford University Boat Club first eight that won the 155th University Boat Race. A year later he became the first non-English mother-tongue person to hold the position of President of that club. He was part of the losing crew of the next year. He is one of the tallest rowers to have competed in the Boat Race, standing at 206 cm (6 feet 9.1 inches) and weighing 100 kg (15.7 stone). Whilst at Oxford, Hamburger rowed in the Oriel 1st VIII in Summer Eights, bumping Pembroke College to finish 2nd on the river. At the 2012 Summer Olympics, he was part of the Dutch men's eight who finished in 5th place.
