= Ivo Yanakiev =

Bulgarian rower (born 1975)

Medal record

Men's rowing

Representing Bulgaria

Olympic Games
Bronze medal – third place	2004 Athens	Single sculls

Ivo Yanakiev (Bulgarian: Иво Янакиев) (born 12 October 1975) is an Olympic medal-winning rower from Bulgaria. He competed at the 2004 Olympic Games in Athens.

He won the bronze medal in the single sculls.

He competed at the 2008 Olympic Games alongside his brother – Martin in the double sculls.

== References and links ==
- Evans, Hilary; Gjerde, Arild; Heijmans, Jeroen; Mallon, Bill; et al. "Ivo Yanakiev". Olympics at Sports-Reference.com. Sports Reference LLC. Archived from the original on 4 March 2016.
- Ivo Yanakiev at World Rowing
