= Women's Boat Race 2010 =

65th Women's Boat Race
- Date: 28 March 2010
- Winner: Oxford
- Margin of victory: 4 lengths
- Winning time: 5 minutes 56 seconds
- Overall record (Cambridge–Oxford): 40–25

The 65th Women's Boat Race took place on 28 March 2010. The race was conducted as part of the Henley Boat Races and took place at Henley-on-Thames. Oxford won by four lengths in a time of 5 minutes 56 seconds, their third consecutive win. The victory took the overall record in the event to 40–25 in Cambridge's favour.

== Background ==
The Women's Boat Race is a side-by-side rowing competition between Oxford University Women's Boat Club (OUWBC) and the Cambridge University Women's Boat Club (CUWBC) that has taken place since 1927. It was conducted as part of the Henley Boat Races, on the traditional straight course at Henley-on-Thames. Oxford went into the race as champions, having won the 2009 race by one and a quarter lengths, with Cambridge leading 40–24 overall.

== Race ==
Oxford won by four lengths in a time of 5 minutes 56 seconds, their third consecutive win. The victory took the overall record in the event to 40–25 in Cambridge's favour. The trophy was presented by the 2009 Oxford University Boat Club president and Olympic silver medallist Colin Smith.

== See also ==
- The Boat Race 2010
