= The Boat Race 2008 =

154th Boat Race
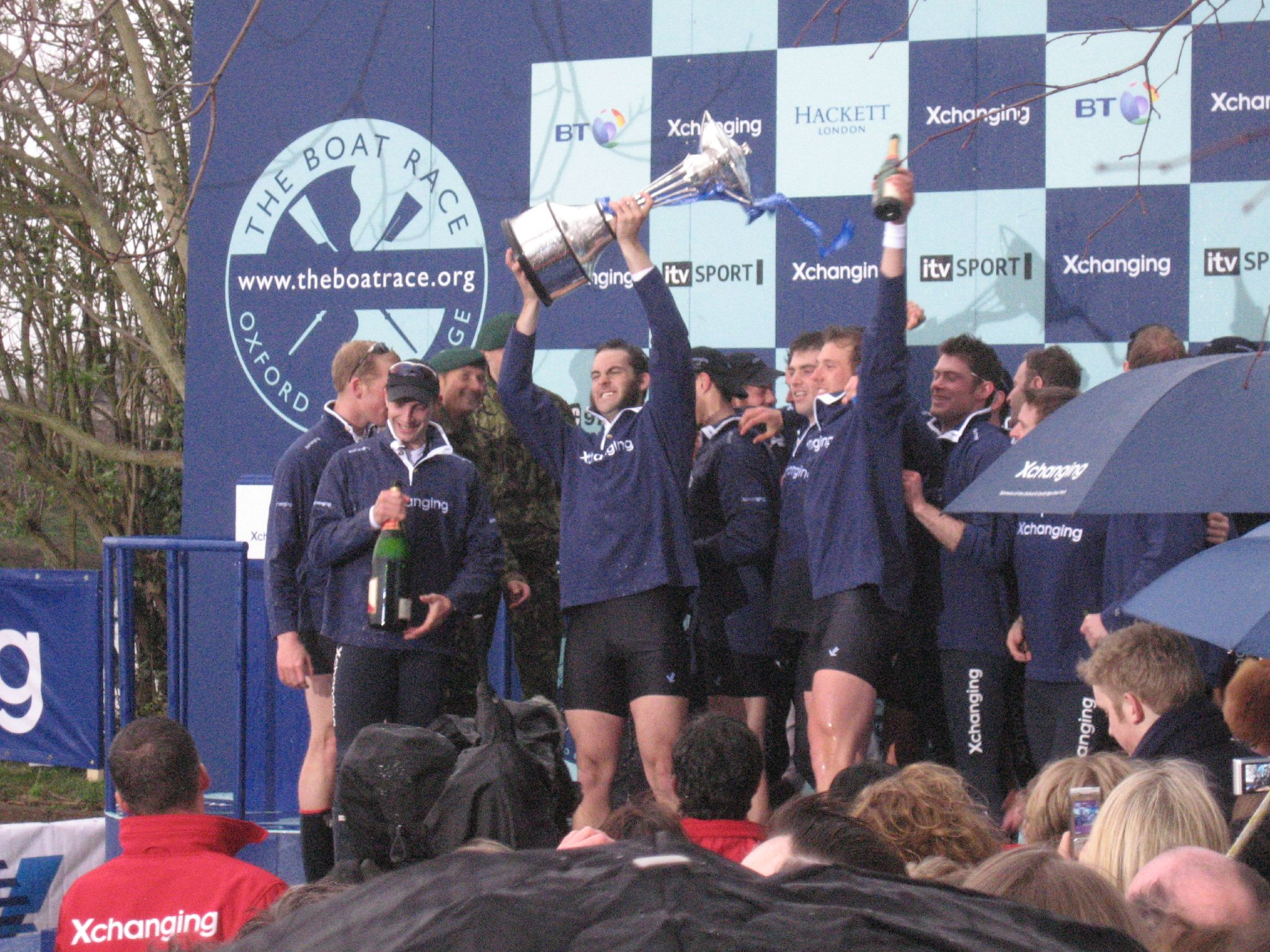
- Oxford celebrate winning the 154th Boat Race
- Date: 29 March 2008
- Winner: Oxford
- Margin of victory: 6 lengths
- Winning time: 20 minutes 53 seconds
- Overall record (Cambridge–Oxford): 79–74
- Umpire: John Garrett

Other races
- Reserve winner: Isis
- Women's winner: Oxford

The 154th Boat Race took place on 29 March 2008. Held annually, the event is a side-by-side rowing race between crews from the Universities of Oxford and Cambridge along the River Thames. Oxford won the race. Oxford's crew featured the oldest competitor in Boat Race history. The race took place in very difficult weather conditions – strong winds and heavy rain – resulting in the slowest winning time in over sixty years. Oxford won by six lengths, the largest margin of victory since the 2004 race.

Oxford's Isis beat Cambridge's Goldie in the reserve race, while Oxford won the Women's Boat Race.

== Background ==
The Boat Race is a side-by-side rowing competition between the University of Oxford (sometimes referred to as the "Dark Blues") and the University of Cambridge (sometimes referred to as the "Light Blues"). First held in 1829, the race takes place on the 4.2-mile (6.8 km) Championship Course on the River Thames in southwest London. The rivalry is a major point of honour between the two universities and followed throughout the United Kingdom and broadcast worldwide. Cambridge went into the race as reigning champions, having beaten Oxford by over a length in the previous year's race and the overall lead, with 79 victories to Oxford's 73 (excluding the "dead heat" of 1877). The race was sponsored by Xchanging for the fourth time.

The first Women's Boat Race took place in 1927, but did not become an annual fixture until the 1960s. Until 2014, the contest was conducted as part of the Henley Boat Races, but as of the 2015 race, it is held on the River Thames, on the same day as the men's main and reserve races. The reserve race, contested between Oxford's Isis boat and Cambridge's Goldie boat has been held since 1965. It usually takes place on the Tideway, prior to the main Boat Race.

== Crews ==
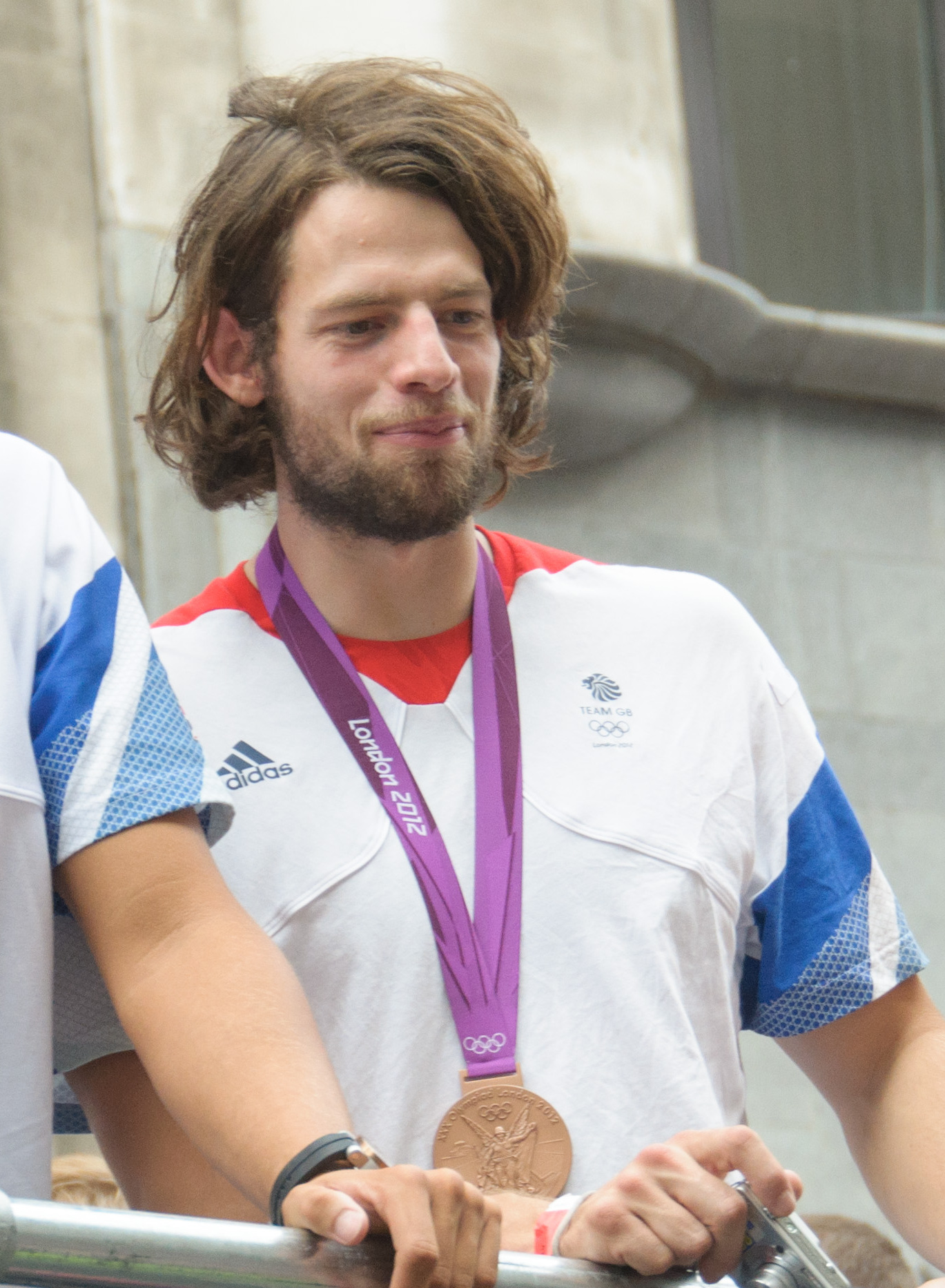
Tom Ransley (pictured in 2012) rowed at number 6 for Cambridge.

Oxford's crew weighed an average of 12 pounds (5.4 kg) more per rower than their opponents, and featured the oldest competitor in Boat Race history in 36-year-old American Mike Wherley. Cambridge crew consisted of six Britons, two Australians and an American, while Oxford's comprised four Americans, three Britons, an Australian and a German. Both coxes, Nick Brodie and Rebecca Dowbiggin, were former Blues, while Cambridge also saw 30-year-old Tom Edwards return, having rowed in 2006. Cambridge's boat club president Dan O'Shaughnessy was the seventh Light Blue president not to row in his own Blue Boat.

Seat	Oxford					Cambridge				
Seat	Name	College	Nationality	Age	Weight	Name	College	Nationality	Age	Weight
Bow	Jan Herzog	St Catherine's	German	33	14 st 4 lb	Colin Scott	Trinity Hall	British	22	13 st 8 lb
2	Toby Medaris	Kellogg	Australian	23	16 st 2 lb	Tim Perkins	Jesus	Australian	29	15 st 0 lb
3	Ben Smith	Christ Church	British	21	15 st 6 lb	Henry Pelly	St Edmund's	British	24	13 st 13 lb
4	Aaron Marcovy	St Edmund Hall	American	24	16 st 1 lb	Tobias Garnett	Trinity	British	24	14 st 10 lb
5	Mike Wherley	Oriel	American	36	15 st 8 lb	Peter Marsland	Clare Hall	British	23	16 st 0 lb
6	Oliver Moore	Oriel	British	22	15 st 14 lb	Tom Ransley	Hughes Hall	British	22	15 st 11 lb
7	Charles Cole	Kellogg	American	21	15 st 2 lb	Tom Edwards	Gonville and Caius	Australian	30	13 st 12 lb
Stroke	Will England	Christ Church	American	22	15 st 5 lb	Ryan Monaghan ‡	Hughes Hall	American	23	15 st 3 lb
Cox	Nick Brodie (P)	St Catherine's	British	21	8 st 6 lb	Rebecca Dowbiggin	Emmanuel	British	24	7 st 10 lb
Source: (P) – boat club president ‡ – Monaghan replaced Shane O' Mara due to illness, three days before the race.

== Race ==
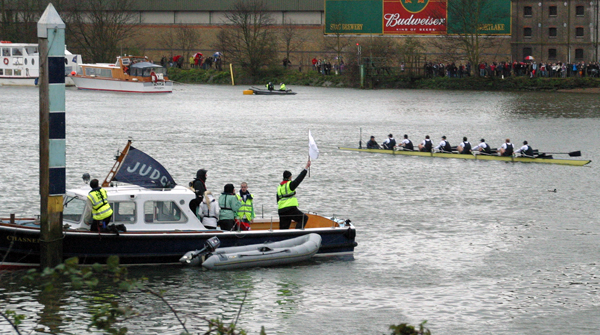
The Oxford boat passing the finishing post

Oxford were pre-race favourites, but Cambridge won the toss and elected to start from the Surrey station. Oxford took an early lead, but the boats closed on each other, and the umpire John Garrett was forced to issue a number of warnings to both coxes in an attempt to prevent a collision. By Craven Cottage, Oxford were nearly a length ahead and Cambridge responded; by the time the crews passed under Hammersmith Bridge they were level. Along Chiswick Eyot Oxford moved ahead once again, and were clear of Cambridge after 30 strokes. Oxford extended their lead to pass the finishing post in 20 minutes 53 seconds, six lengths and 22 seconds ahead of their opponents. Driving rain, strong winds and choppy water resulted in the slowest winning time for over sixty years, but the largest margin of victory since the 2004 race.

Oxford's Isis beat Cambridge's Goldie by 3 1/4 lengths in the reserve race. Oxford won the 44th running of the Women's Boat Race by half a length.

== Reaction ==
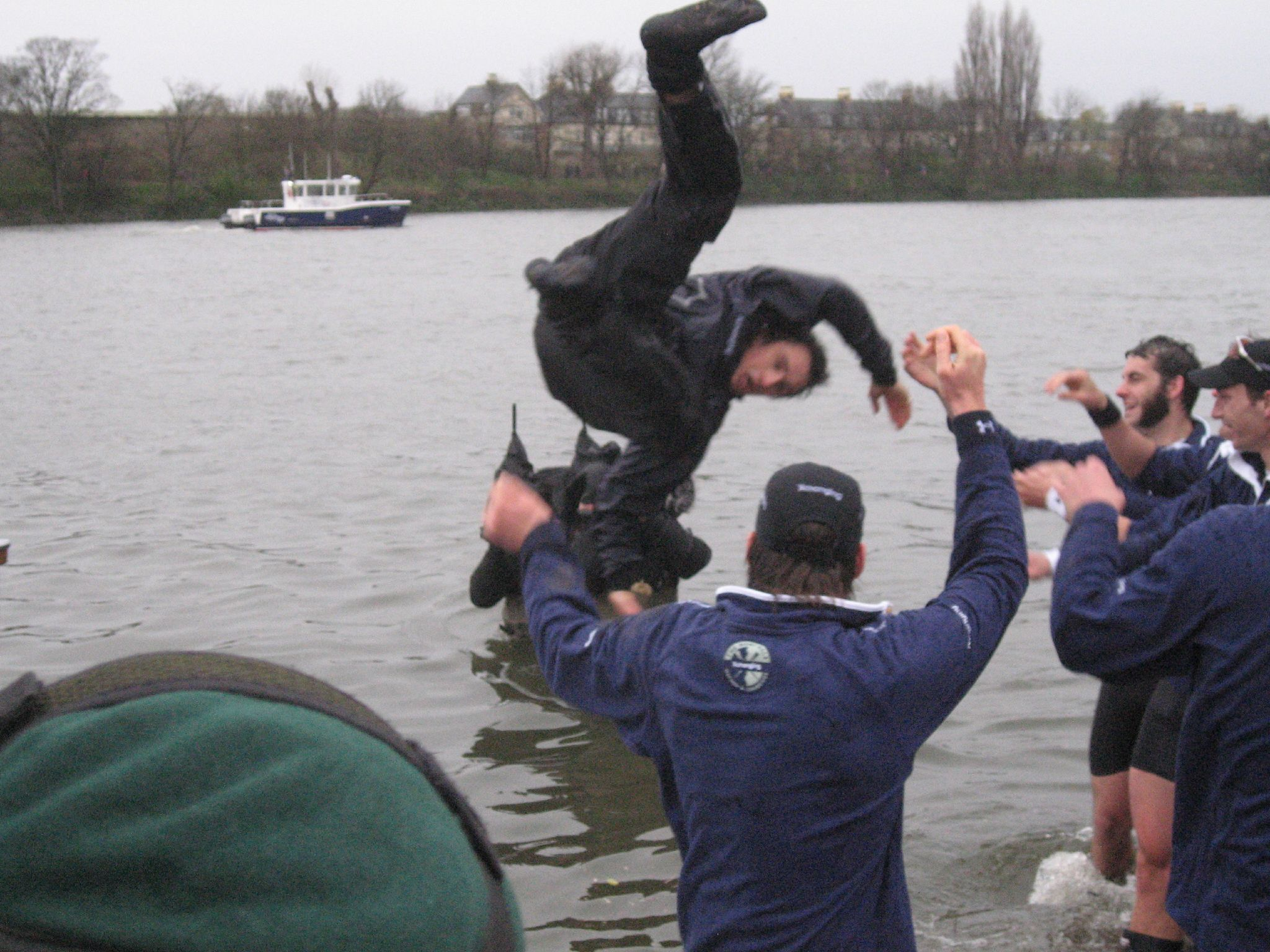
Oxford cox, Nick Brodie, is thrown into the River Thames as part of the celebrations.

Oxford's Oliver Moore said "we got the rage going in the crew, and we started to kill it, we hit an awesome rhythm". Cambridge coach Duncan Holland congratulated his opponents: "Well done to Oxford, they were much faster on the day". Following tradition, the victorious Oxford crew tossed their cox Brodie into the Thames.
