= Clemens Wenzel =

German rower (born 1988)

Personal information
- Nationality: German
- Born: 23 August 1988 (age 38) Prenzlau, Bezirk Neubrandenburg, East Germany

Sport
- Sport: Rowing

Clemens Wenzel (born 23 August 1988) is a German rower. He competed in the men's double sculls event at the 2008 Summer Olympics.
