= Aleksandr Kornilov (rower) =

Russian rower

Personal information
- Born: Aleksandr Sergeyevich Kornilov; 12 April 1985 (age 41) Dushanbe, Tajikistan
- Height: 192 cm (6 ft 4 in)
- Weight: 95 kg (209 lb)

Sport
- Sport: Rowing
- Club: Russian Army Sports Club; Trud Kolomna
Medal record
Men's rowing
Representing Russia
European Championships
Gold medal – first place	2007 Poznań	Coxed four
Silver medal – second place	2016 Brandenburg	Eight

Aleksandr Sergeyevich Kornilov (Russian: Александр Сергеевич Корнилов, also transliterated Alexander, born 12 April 1985) is a Russian rower. He won a gold medal in coxed fours at the 2007 European Championships and a silver in eights in 2016. He placed 11th in the double sculls at the 2008 Summer Olympics. In May 2016, he became one of 14 Russian athletes implicated in doping following the retesting of urine from the 2008 Olympics. His sample A failed the retest, but these results were not confirmed on his sample B.
