= Christophe Raes =

Belgian rower

Personal information
- Nationality: Belgian
- Born: 21 February 1982 (age 43); Ghent, Belgium

Sport
- Sport: Rowing

Christophe Raes (born 21 February 1982) is a Belgian rower. He competed in the men's double sculls event at the 2008 Summer Olympics.
