= Wes Piermarini =

American rower

Personal information
- Born: November 19, 1982 (age 43) Northampton, Massachusetts, United States

Sport
- Sport: Rowing

Wes Piermarini (born November 19, 1982) is an American rower. He competed at the 2008 Summer Olympics and the 2012 Summer Olympics.
