= Elliot Hovey =

American rower (born 1983)

Elliot Meyer Hovey (born 17 February 1983 in Boston, Massachusetts) is an American rower who participated in the 2008 Summer Olympics and 2012 Summer Olympics.

During his youth in New England, Hovey's athletic focus was primarily on downhill ski racing. By high school he lost interest and began his rowing career at Salisbury School in Salisbury, Connecticut (1999). He quickly rose through the ranks on Salisbury's Crew with hopes of following his grandfather's footsteps and row on an Ivy League college team.

In the process, Hovey posted nationally ranked Concept2 ergometer scores for 2000 meter tests at the Junior level. He was invited to the US Junior National Rowing Team selection camps in 2000 and 2001 which both took place on the Schuylkill River in Philadelphia, Pennsylvania. Hovey failed to be selected and was cut from both teams. He was then recruited by coaches Booth Kyle and Ed Kloman (2000) as well as Evans Liolin and Colin Campbell (2001) to row with the Boston Rowing Center's (BRC) junior men's development teams. Both years at BRC were enormously successful.

In the fall of 2001, Hovey applied early decision to Brown University with hopes to fulfill his dream to row on an Ivy League team. He was immediately deferred and then wait listed. Shortly after he was approached by the University of California, Berkeley's Freshman coach Geoff Bond and offered a promising opportunity to row for the California Golden Bears. Turning his back on the Ivy League dream, Hovey applied to the University of California, Berkeley and enrolled in classes the next fall.

Elliot Hovey resigned his membership at the California Rowing Club (CRC) in Oakland, CA in early December, 2009 and affiliated with the US Rowing Training Center located at the U.S. Olympic Training Center in Chula Vista, California. He is currently a member of Union Boat Club in Boston, Massachusetts and an Ordinary Member of Leander Club in Henley-on-Thames, England.

He currently resides in Minturn, Colorado.

== Achievements ==
=== Olympics ===
2012 Summer Olympics- London 2012 - Men's Quadruple Sculls (M4x) with teammates Peter Graves, Alex Osborne, and Wes Piermarini - 13th place.

2008 Summer Olympics - Beijing 2008 - Men's Double Sculls (M2x) with partner Wes Piermarini - 13th place.

=== World Championships ===
2009 World Rowing Championships - Poznań, Poland - Men's Quadruple Sculls (M4x) - 12th place.

=== World Cups ===
2010 Rowing World Cup III - Rotsee, Lucerne, Switzerland - Men's Quadruple Sculls (M4X) - 8th place.

2010 Rowing World Cup II - Munich, Germany - Men's Quadruple Sculls (M4X) - 7th place.

2009 Rowing World Cup III - Rotsee, Lucerne, Switzerland - Men's Quadruple Sculls (M4X) - 4th place.

=== Henley Royal Regatta ===
2008 Henley Royal Regatta - Henley-on-Thames, England - Winner of Double Sculls Challenge Cup with partner Wes Piermarini.

=== U.S. Rowing Selection Regattas ===
2010 US National Selection Regatta (NSR 3) Men's Double Sculls with Wes Piermarini - 2nd place.

2009 US National Selection Regatta (NSR 2) Men's Double Sculls with Warren Anderson - 2nd place.

2009 US National Selection Regatta (NSR 1) Men's Single Sculls - 5th place.

2008 US Rowing Olympic Trials - West Windsor, New Jersey - Men's Double Sculls with Wes Piermarini - 1st place.

=== Intercollegiate ===
2006 Intercollegiate Rowing Association (IRA) national champion, University of California, Berkeley Men's Varsity Eight (8+) (2 seat).

2006 Pac-10 Conference Champion, University of California, Berkeley Men's Varsity Eight (8+) (2 seat).

2006 All-Conference winner and selected for the All-Pac-10 Team.

=== Club ===
Winner of the 2007 Royal Canadian Henley Regatta in the Sr. Men's Double Scull with partner Michael Holbrook.
