= Bart Poelvoorde =

Belgian rower

Personal information
- Nationality: Belgian
- Born: 18 May 1981 (age 43); Ostend, Belgium

Sport
- Sport: Rowing

Bart Poelvoorde (born 18 May 1981) is a Belgian rower. He competed in the men's double sculls event at the 2008 Summer Olympics.
