= Cédric de Greve =

Belgian field hockey player

Personal information
- Nationality: Belgian
- Born: 27 February 1979 (age 47) Uccle, Belgium

Sport
- Sport: Field hockey

Cédric de Greve (born 27 February 1979) is a Belgian field hockey player. He competed in the men's tournament at the 2008 Summer Olympics.
