= The Boat Race 1946 =

92nd Boat Race
- Date: 30 March 1946
- Winner: Oxford
- Margin of victory: 3 lengths
- Winning time: 19 minutes 54 seconds
- Overall record (Cambridge–Oxford): 48–43
- Umpire: Kenneth Payne (Cambridge)

Other races
- Women's winner: Cambridge

The 92nd Boat Race took place on 30 March 1946. Held annually, the Boat Race is a side-by-side rowing race between crews from the Universities of Oxford and Cambridge along the River Thames in London. In a race umpired by former Cambridge rower Kenneth Payne, Oxford won by three lengths in a time of 19 minutes 54 seconds. The victory took the overall record in the event to 48–43 in Cambridge's favour.

== Background ==
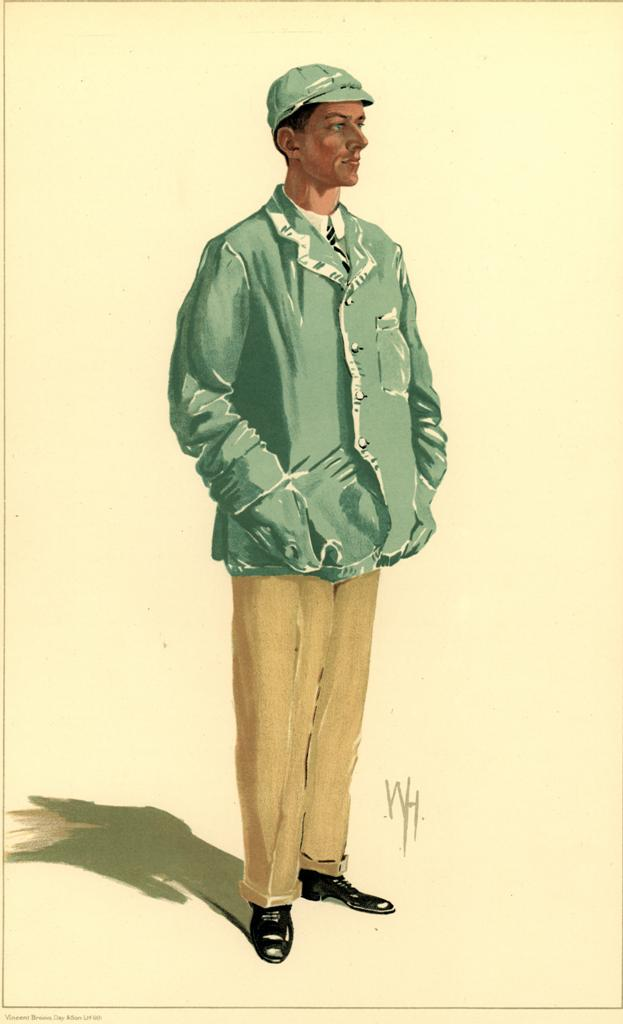
Sidney Swann (caricature featured in Vanity Fair in 1912) coached the Cambridge crew.

The Boat Race is a side-by-side rowing competition between the University of Oxford (sometimes referred to as the "Dark Blues") and the University of Cambridge (sometimes referred to as the "Light Blues"). The race was first held in 1829, and since 1845 has taken place on the 4.2-mile (6.8 km) Championship Course on the River Thames in southwest London. The rivalry is a major point of honour between the two universities; it is followed throughout the United Kingdom and, as of 2014, broadcast worldwide. Cambridge went into the race as reigning champions, having won the 1939 race by four lengths, and led overall with 48 victories to Oxford's 42 (excluding the "dead heat" of 1877). No official races were conducted between 1940 and 1945 as a result of the Second World War.

Oxford were coached by R. E. Eason (who rowed for the Dark Blues in the 1924 race), D. T. Raikes (who represented Oxford in the 1920, 1921 and 1922 races), Peter Haig Thomas (a four-time Light Blue between 1902 and 1905, who had also coached Cambridge nine times between 1924 and 1934) and G. L. Thomson. Cambridge's coaches were B. C. Johnstone, Sidney Swann (who had rowed for the Light Blues in the four races from 1911 to 1914, and coached them in the 1920, 1921 and 1922 races) and Claude Waterhouse Hearn Taylor (who rowed for Cambridge three times between 1901 and 1903, and coached them in the 1904 race). The race was umpired by the former British Olympian Kenneth Payne, who had rowed for Cambridge in the 1932 and 1934 races.

During the build-up to the race, Cambridge suffered misfortune in particular with regard to their number four. M. A. Nicholson, the first choice, was taken ill and was replaced by P. A. G. Dewar. Just two days later Dewar was forced to leave the boat suffering with blood poisoning from a septic boil. D. J. D. Perrins was Cambridge's third and final choice. With a week to go, the Light Blue coach Thomson stated "we took a day off yesterday because some of the crew were feeling off-colour ... they appear to be suffering from some internal trouble". The rowing correspondent for The Manchester Guardian noted that the Light Blues were "not quite fast enough and are not particularly well together" yet showed promise. He also noted that while Oxford had improved considerably, Cambridge would most likely start as favourites.

== Crews ==
The Cambridge crew weighed an average of 12 st 7 lb (79.2 kg), 8.75 pounds (4.0 kg) per rower more than their opponents. As the event was forced to take a hiatus between 1940 and 1945 as a result of the Second World War, none of the rowers had participated in the Boat Race prior this year. Three of the Cambridge crew were registered as non-British: J. G. Gosse was Australian, P. L. P. Mcdonnell was Canadian and stroke J. H. Neame was American.

Seat	Oxford			Cambridge		
Seat	Name	College	Weight	Name	College	Weight
Bow	R. M. T. Raikes	Trinity	11 st 2 lb	J. S. Paton-Philip (P)	Lady Margaret Boat Club	12 st 0 lb
2	R. T. Turner (P)	Oriel	11 st 0 lb	T. J. Sullivan	Clare	12 st 0 lb
3	J. M. Barrie	Queen's	12 st 7 lb	P. L. P. Macdonnell	Trinity Hall	13 st 2.5 lb
4	R. M. A. Bourne	New College	11 st 13 lb	D. J. D. Perrins	Jesus	12 st 2 lb
5	J. R. L. Carstairs	Christ Church	12 st 9 lb	G. E. C. Thomas	Jesus	13 st 9 lb
6	J. R. W. Gleave	Magdalen	12 st 4 lb	J. G. Gosse	Trinity Hall	12 st 3 lb
7	P. N. Brodie	Oriel	11 st 7 lb	M. S. Allman-Ward	Christ's	13 st 4 lb
Stroke	A. J. R. Purssell	Oriel	11 st 13 lb	J. H. Neame	Trinity Hall	11 st 7 lb
Cox	R. Ebsworth Snow	Magdalen	9 st 1 lb	G. H. C. Fisher	1st & 3rd Trinity	9 st 1 lb
Source: (P) – boat club president

== Race ==
The Championship Course along which the Boat Race is contested

Cambridge won the toss and elected to start from the Surrey station, handing the Middlesex side of the river to Oxford. Umpire Payne started the race "in perfect conditions of a south-easterly breeze and with sun shining through a light mist" at 11 a.m in front of "a vast crowd, fully up to pre-war standards". Followed by six launches and a helicopter overhead, Oxford led from the start, and were half a length clear of the Light Blues by the time they passed Craven Steps. Marginally out-rating Cambridge, Oxford passed the Mile Post two and a half lengths ahead and allowed their stroke rate to drop, still maintaining their lead at Hammersmith Bridge. Cambridge spurted at The Doves pub and reduced the deficit marginally but by HMS Stork, the Light Blues were visibly tired and allowed Oxford to draw away once more.

Leading by three lengths at Chiswick Steps, Oxford reduced their stroke rate to "little more than a paddle", yet still passed below Barnes Bridge with the same advantage. The Dark Blues passed the finishing post three lengths ahead in a time of 19 minutes 54 seconds. The victory, Oxford's third in the last four races, took the overall record in the event to 48–43 in Cambridge's favour. The special correspondent writing in The Times stated that Oxford won "in faultless style and without ever looking anything but an assured winning crew." It was reported in the Dundee Evening Telegraph that Oxford's win was "a triumph of team-work over individualism". Hugh Dalton, the Chancellor of the Exchequer, announced that the race had made £700 from Purchase Tax.
