= Stephen Rowbotham =

British rower

Medal record

Representing Great Britain

Men's rowing

Olympic Games
Bronze medal – third place	2008 Beijing	Double sculls

World Rowing Championships
Bronze medal – third place	2006 Eton	Double sculls

Stephen Christopher Rowbotham (born 11 November 1981, in Swindon) is a British rower. He competed at the 2008 Summer Olympics, where he won a bronze medal in double sculls. In 2012, the quadruple sculls boat he was in finished in 5th place.

Rowbotham was educated at Clifton College and Durham University where he switched from tennis to rowing. He graduated from Durham in 2003 with a Bachelor of Arts degree in Business Economics.
