= The Boat Race 2007 =

153rd Boat Race
- Date: 7 April 2007
- Winner: Cambridge
- Margin of victory: 1 1/4 lengths
- Winning time: 17 minutes 49 seconds
- Overall record (Cambridge–Oxford): 79–73
- Umpire: Peter Bridge (Oxford)

Other races
- Reserve winner: Goldie
- Women's winner: Cambridge

The 153rd The Boat Race took place on 7 April 2007, and featured the most non-British rowers in the history of the event. Held annually, the Boat Race is a side-by-side rowing race between crews from the Universities of Oxford and Cambridge along the River Thames. The Cambridge crew were considerably heavier than their opponents. Oxford won the toss but Cambridge won the race by 1 1/4 lengths in a time of 17 minutes 49 seconds.

In the reserve race Goldie beat Isis and Cambridge won the Women's Boat Race.

== Background ==
The Championship Course along which the Boat Race is competed

The Boat Race is a side-by-side rowing competition between the University of Oxford (sometimes referred to as the "Dark Blues") and the University of Cambridge (sometimes referred to as the "Light Blues"). First held in 1829, the race takes place on the 4.2 miles (6.8 km) Championship Course on the River Thames in southwest London. The rivalry is a major point of honour between the two universities and followed throughout the United Kingdom and broadcast worldwide. Oxford went into the race as reigning champions, having won the 2006 race by five lengths, although Cambridge led overall with 78 victories to Oxford's 73 (excluding the "dead heat" of 1877). The race was sponsored by Xchanging for the third time.

The first Women's Boat Race took place in 1927, but did not become an annual fixture until the 1960s. Until 2014, the contest was conducted as part of the Henley Boat Races, but as of the 2015 race, it is held on the River Thames, on the same day as the men's main and reserve races. The reserve race, contested between Oxford's Isis boat and Cambridge's Goldie boat has been held since 1965. It usually takes place on the Tideway, prior to the main Boat Race.

== Crews ==
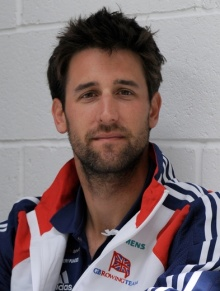
Tom James rowed at number 5 for Cambridge.

The Cambridge crew (sometimes referred to as the "Light Blues") was 9 pounds (4.1 kg) per man heavier than their Oxford rivals (sometimes referred to as the "Dark Blues"). The Oxford crew featured four Americans, two Britons, a Canadian, a Croatian and a Pole, while the Cambridge crew consisted of four Britons, two Canadians, two Germans and an American. The race featured the most non-British rowers in the history of the event, and in German Thorsten Engelmann, the heaviest rower ever. Rebecca Dowbiggin became the thirteenth female cox in the race's history and the seventh female cox for Cambridge. Cambridge's head coach was Duncan Holland, his Oxford counterpart was Sean Bowden.

Seat	Cambridge				Oxford			
Seat	Name	College	Nationality	Age	Name	College	Nationality	Age
Bow	Kristopher McDaniel	St. Edmund's	Canadian	25	Michal Plotkowiak	Brasenose	Polish	25
2	Dan O'Shaughnessy	St. Edmund's	Canadian	24	Adam Kosmicki	Oriel	American	22
3	Peter Champion	St. Edmund's	British	24	Andrew Wright	St. Edmund Hall	American	26
4	Jacob Cornelius	Emmanuel	American	22	Magnus Fleming	Worcester	American	26
5	Tom James (P)	Trinity Hall	British	23	Robin Ejsmond-Frey (P)	Oriel	British	21
6	Kieran West	Pembroke	British	29	William Buckland	Jesus	Canadian	23
7	Sebastian Schulte	Gonville & C	German	28	Terence Kookyer	Keble	American	23
Stroke	Thorsten Engelmann	St. Edmund's	German	25	Ante Kušurin	St. Catherine's	Croatian	23
Cox	Rebecca Dowbiggin ‡	Emmanuel	British	23	Nick Brodie	St. Catherine's	British	20
(P) – Boat club president ‡ – Dowbiggin replaced Cambridge's first-choice cox Russ Glenn ten days before the race.

== Race description ==
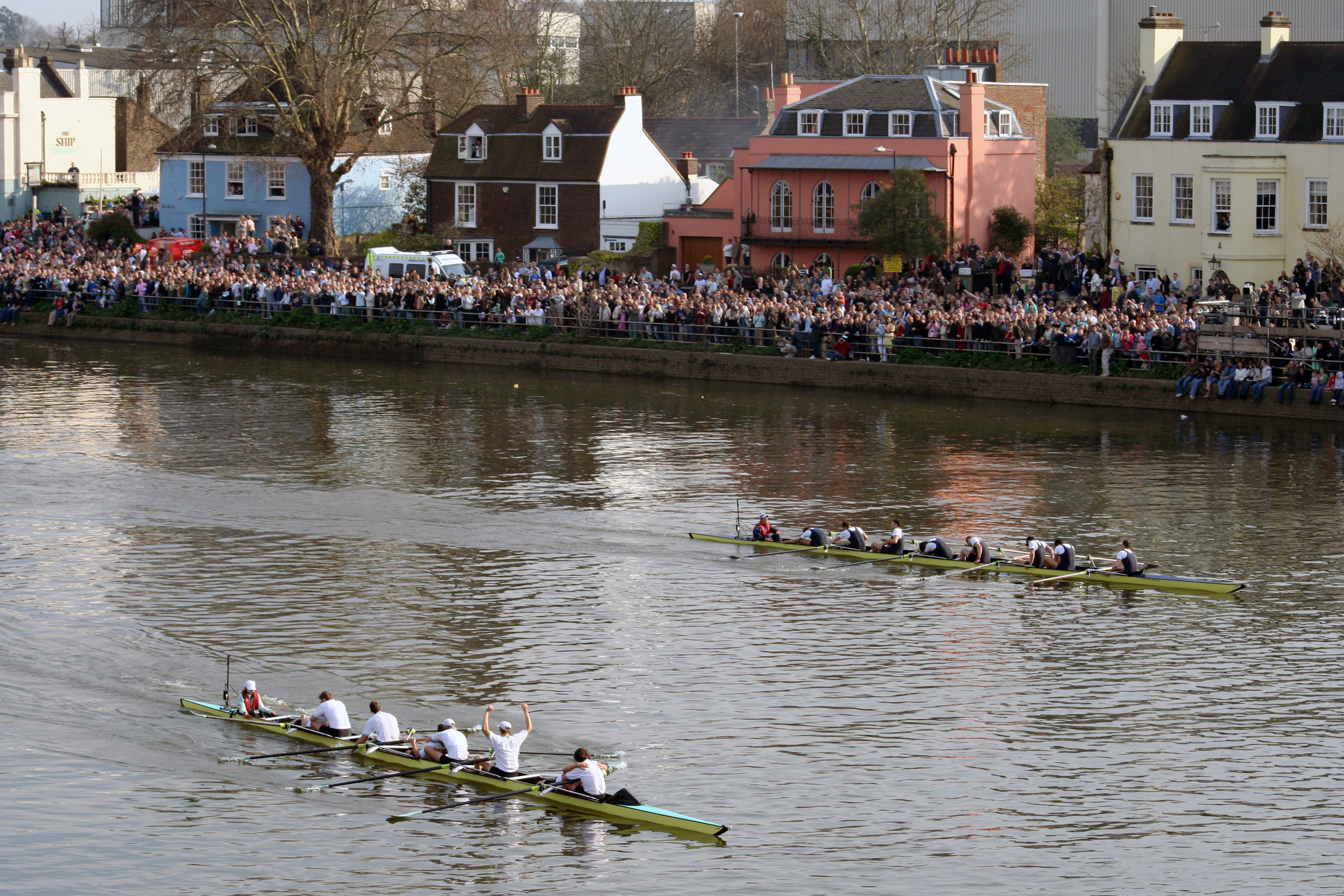
Both crews at the end of the 2007 race (Cambridge, left, celebrating)

Oxford won the toss and elected to start from the Surrey station. The race was umpired by former Oxford Blue Peter Bridge. Oxford took an early lead, and were just ahead at Hammersmith Bridge. Cambridge edged back into contention by the Chiswick Steps and heading under Barnes Bridge were a length clear. They passed the finishing post first, in a time of 17 minutes 49 seconds, a length-and-a-quarter ahead of Oxford. It was Cambridge's first victory since 2004 and took their overall lead in the contest to 79–73. At the finish, following tradition, the Cambridge crew threw their cox, Dowbiggin, into the water in celebration. She later said "They flung me a really long way in there, and the water was freezing, but it was worth it."

In the reserve race, Cambridge's Goldie beat Oxford's Isis. Earlier, Cambridge won the 62nd Women's Boat Race by half a length.

== Reaction ==
Oxford coach Sean Bowden said "We had a good race and made all the right moves to Hammersmith, but we couldn't quite shake them off and didn't quite have enough lead to defend", while Cambridge's number six Kieran West said "Credit to Oxford. They threw everything they had at us, but we absorbed it all." Cambridge head coach Duncan Holland praised his cox: "Rebecca was magnificent. She steered a superb course. She steered exactly where we thought she should steer and she stayed calm, it was great." Dowbiggin herself recounted: "The guys asked me to be very calm, very relaxed, not to panic, even if Oxford were pushing and moving, I was just like 'okay, they're pushing, they're moving, but we're going to do this'." Bowden criticised the umpire who he claimed "pushed us too tight round the bend. From Hammersmith Bridge on that took away our advantage." Cambridge's Tom James was finally successful, winning the Boat Race at his fourth attempt: "I really couldn't think about losing this race. Oxford really hounded us. The line was getting closer but never quickly enough."
