= Mario Vekić =

Croatian rower

Personal information
- Born: 27 December 1982 (age 43) Osijek, SR Croatia, SFR Yugoslavia
- Height: 190 cm (6 ft 3 in)
- Weight: 94 kg (207 lb)

Sport
- Country: Croatia
- Sport: Rowing
- Event: Sculls
Medal record
Men's rowing
Representing Croatia
European Rowing Championships
Silver medal – second place	2007 Poznań	M2x
Bronze medal – third place	2009 Brest	M1x
Bronze medal – third place	2011 Plovdiv	M1x
Mediterranean Games
Silver medal – second place	2009 Pescara	M1x

Mario Vekić (born 27 December 1982) is a Croatian rower who competes in the sculls events.
