= Martin Yanakiev =

Bulgarian rower

Personal information
- Nationality: Bulgarian
- Born: 8 March 1983 (age 42); Burgas, Bulgaria

Sport
- Sport: Rowing

Martin Yanakiev (Bulgarian: Мартин Янакиев; born 8 March 1983) is a Bulgarian rower. He competed in the men's double sculls event at the 2008 Summer Olympics.
