= Robert Weitemeyer =

Canadian rower

Medal record

Men's rowing

Representing Canada

World Rowing Championships
Silver medal – second place	2004 Banyoles	M4+
Bronze medal – third place	2005 Gifu	M4-

World Rowing Cup
Gold medal – first place	2007 Linz	M8+

Robert Weitemeyer (born 5 August 1982 in New Westminster) is a Canadian rower.
