= Xchanging =

UK DXC Technology owned company

Xchanging - DXC Technology Company
- Type: Public (LSE: XCH)
- Industry: Technology
- Founded: 1999
- Headquarters: London, United Kingdom
- Key people: Geoff Unwin; (Chairman); Craig Wilson; (CEO); David Bauernfeind; (CFO)
- Revenue: £440.2 million (2015)
- Number of employees: 7,000 (2015)
- Parent: DXC Technology
- Website: xchanging.com

Xchanging is a business process and technology services provider and integrator, owned by DXC Technology, providing business services to the commercial insurance industry. In outsourcing, Xchanging will typically take over a customer's business process, or back office function, and incorporate them into an existing platform.

Xchanging employs over 7,000 people worldwide. Xchanging offers IT outsourcing, infrastructure including network managed services, software products and application management. It also sells procurement services.

It was listed on the London Stock Exchange until it was acquired by CSC in May 2016. On 3 April 2017, DXC Technology announced that Xchanging was now part of the new company formed by the merger of CSC and HPE Enterprise Services.

== History ==
Xchanging was founded in 1999, by David Andrews, a former partner in Andersen Consulting. Andrews came up with the idea at Andersen Consulting, to create joint ventures with multinational companies to outsource the processing of back-office transactions.

In 2000, Xchanging and BAE Systems created the first of these 'Enterprise Partnerships', for HR services (see also). A second followed soon after, again with BAE Systems, for indirect procurement. In 2012, Xchanging entered the US Indirect Procurement market through an agreement with U.S. based BAE Systems representing $800 million in spend to be addressed over 7 years.

Two years later, Xchanging and Lloyd's of London created two more 'Enterprise Partnerships', one for claims processing, and one for the London Insurance market's back office system; the latter including the IUA as a partner too. Further partnerships were signed with Deutsche Bank in 2004 (introducing Xchanging into the European financial market), Aon in 2006 (in broking services) and Allianz GI in 2007.

In 2007, Xchanging listed on the London Stock Exchange, entering the FTSE250.

In 2009, Xchanging acquired a 75% stake in Cambridge Solutions, another outsourcing business.

In 2010, Xchanging further expanded in the European financial sector by developing an eighth 'Enterprise Partnership' with Italian group, SIA-SSB. As part of this deal Xchanging acquired 51% of Kedrios S.p.A. (Kedrios), the Italian subsidiary of SIA-SSB that specialises in securities processing and fund administration services for the Italian market.

In mid 2010, Xchanging acquired security and technology communications company, Data Integration. The company is an IT services business in the United Kingdom. The company specialises in network security, application optimisation, mobility services, high performance networks, IP telephony and open access networks.

Based on a number of long-term Enterprise Partnerships and the acquisition of Cambridge Solutions, Xchanging reported a 35% revenue increase year-on-year to £750.4m, at the end of 2009.

On 8 February 2011, Xchanging issued a profit warning and announced a £100 million write-off on goodwill. David Andrews stepped down with immediate effect and became "senior adviser to the chairman", Ken Lever assumed the role of Acting Chief Executive Officer in addition to his role as CFO.

On 3 July 2014, Xchanging acquired Total Objects Ltd.

In May 2016, CSC acquired Xchanging plc in a deal valued at £480 million, or approximately US$720 million.

=== Notable partners and customers ===
Xchanging's partners include Lloyd's of London, Deutsche Bank, Allianz, Aon SIA-SSB and others.

== Operations ==
Xchanging works with large organisations in processing areas such as HR, accounting, technology, customer administration, and procurement. Also, industry specific processing includes securities processing and insurance claims processing and others.

== Locations ==
Xchanging has offices in ten principal locations - Australia - Insurance and Procurement, France - RTO and Nasdaq, Italy - Monetary Policy and Compensation, Germany, India, Japan, Malaysia, Singapore, the UK and the United States.

=== Low-Carbon Shimoga Project ===
On Prime Minister David Cameron's visit to India in July 2010, CEO David Andrews revealed plans to create a new low-carbon 1,000 person processing centre, with an option to scale to 2,000, in Shimoga, a tier three town, north-west of Bangalore."

== University Boat Race ==
Xchanging was the title sponsor of the Boat Race, an annual rowing competition between the Oxford and Cambridge universities from 2005 until 2012.
