= Rowing at the 2008 Summer Olympics – Men's eight =

Men's eight at the Games of the XXIX Olympiad
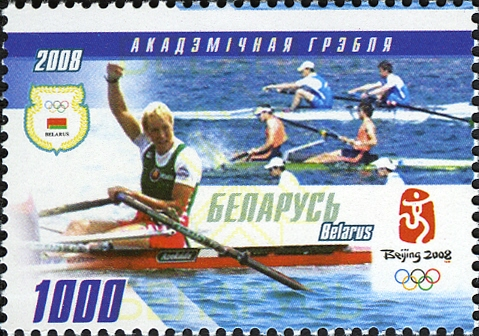
- Belarus stamp commemorating rowing at the 2008 Olympics
- Venue: Shunyi Olympic Rowing-Canoeing Park
- Dates: August 11, 2008 Heats; August 12, 2008 Repechage; August 16, 2008 Final B August 17, 2008 Final A
- Competitors: 75 from 8 nations
- Winning time: 5:23.89

Medalists
1st place, gold medalist(s)		Canada: Kevin Light; Ben Rutledge; Andrew Byrnes; Jake Wetzel; Malcolm Howard; Dominic Seiterle; Adam Kreek; Kyle Hamilton; Brian Price
2nd place, silver medalist(s)		Great Britain: Alex Partridge; Tom Stallard; Tom Lucy; Richard Egington; Josh West; Alastair Heathcote; Matt Langridge; Colin Smith; Acer Nethercott
3rd place, bronze medalist(s)		United States: Beau Hoopman; Matt Schnobrich; Micah Boyd; Wyatt Allen; Dan Walsh; Steven Coppola; Josh Inman; Brian Volpenhein; Marcus McElhenney

The men's eight (M8+) competition at the 2008 Summer Olympics in Beijing was held from August 11 to August 17 at the Shunyi Olympic Rowing-Canoeing Park. Seven of nine national teams returned from the men's eight competition at the 2004 Summer Olympics to compete again, joined by the host nation. A total of 75 competitors took part, with three substitutions made during the competition. The event was won by Canada, the nation's first victory in the men's eight since 1992 and third overall (tying Great Britain for second-most, behind the United States' 12). The British team took silver, with the Americans finishing with the bronze medal.

== Background ==
This was the 25th appearance of the event. Rowing had been on the programme in 1896 but was cancelled due to bad weather. The men's eight has been held every time that rowing has been contested, beginning in 1900.

The field was competitive. The top two teams were both from North America: the United States was the reigning Olympic champion, the 2005 World Champion, and the 2007 Pan American champion; Canada was the reigning (2007) World Champion. Germany was also strong, winning the 2006 World Championship and being the runner-up in 2007.

For the second consecutive Games, no nations made their debut in the event. The United States made its 22nd appearance, most among nations to that point.

== Qualification ==
Nations had been limited to one boat each since 1920. The 8 qualifiers were:

- 7 boats from the 2007 World Championships
- 1 boat from the Final Qualification Regatta

== Competition format ==
The 2008 Summer Olympics M8+ rowing competition consisted of eight teams, split into two four-team heats. Each team fielded a boat crewed by eight rowers and a coxswain. Each rower used a single oar, with four oars on each side of the boat. The winner of each heat qualified for the "Final A" (or medal final). The remaining six teams competed in the repechage round, with the top four from that round qualifying for the "Final A" round. The last two teams in the repechage competed in the "Final B".

The final ranking for rowing at the 2008 Summer Olympics was based on the order of finish in the two finals. The top three of the "Final A" teams earned Olympic medals for placing first, second, and third, while the remaining "Final A" teams placed fourth through sixth, according to their "Final A" finish. The "Final B" competition determined who places seventh and eight in the event's final ranking.

== Schedule ==
All times are China Standard Time (UTC+8)

Date	Time	Round
Monday, August 11, 2008	15:10	Semifinals
Tuesday, August 12, 2008	17:10	Repechage
Saturday, August 16, 2008	15:20	Final B
Sunday, August 17, 2008	17:30	Final A

== Results ==
=== Semifinals ===
==== Semifinal 1 ====
Rank	Rowers	Coxswain	Nation	Time	Notes
1	Kevin Light; Ben Rutledge; Andrew Byrnes; Jake Wetzel; Malcolm Howard; Dominic Seiterle; Adam Kreek; Kyle Hamilton	Brian Price	Canada	5:27.69	QA
2	Sebastian Kosiorek; Michał Stawowski; Patryk Brzeziński; Sławomir Kruszkowski; Rafał Hejmej; Marcin Brzeziński; Wojciech Gutorski; Mikołaj Burda	Daniel Trojanowski	Poland	5:34.95	R
3	Olivier Siegelaar; Rogier Blink; Meindert Klem; Jozef Klaassen; David Kuiper; Mitchel Steenman; Olaf van Andel; Diederik Simon	Peter Wiersum	Netherlands	5:40.43	R
4	David Dennis; Samuel Loch; James Chapman; Tom Laurich; Jeremy Stevenson; James Tomkins; Sam Conrad; Stephen Stewart	Marty Rabjohns	Australia	6:55.59	R

==== Semifinal 2 ====
Rank	Rowers	Coxswain	Nation	Time	Notes
1	Alex Partridge; Tom Stallard; Tom Lucy; Richard Egington; Josh West; Alastair Heathcote; Matt Langridge; Colin Smith	Acer Nethercott	Great Britain	5:25.89	QA
2	Beau Hoopman; Matt Schnobrich; Micah Boyd; Wyatt Allen; Dan Walsh; Steven Coppola; Josh Inman; Bryan Volpenhein	Marcus McElhenney	United States	5:29.60	R
3	Qu Xiaoming; Wang Jingfeng; Liu Zhen; He Yi; Zhang Shunyin; Zhou Yinan; Zhang Yongqiang; Wang Xiangdang	Zhang Dechang	China	5:35.09	R
4	Florian Eichner; Sebastian Schmidt; Matthias Flach; Philipp Naruhn; Jochen Urban; Florian Mennigen; Kristof Wilke; Andreas Penkner	Peter Thiede	Germany	5:37.56	R

=== Repechage ===
Rank	Rowers	Coxswain	Nation	Time	Notes
1	Beau Hoopman; Matt Schnobrich; Micah Boyd; Wyatt Allen; Dan Walsh; Steven Coppola; Josh Inman; Bryan Volpenhein	Marcus McElhenney	United States	5:38.95	QA
2	Reinder Lubbers; Rogier Blink; Meindert Klem; Jozef Klaassen; David Kuiper; Mitchel Steenman; Olaf van Andel; Diederik Simon	Peter Wiersum	Netherlands	5:40.31	QA
3	David Dennis; Samuel Loch; James Chapman; Tom Laurich; Jeremy Stevenson; James Tomkins; Sam Conrad; Stephen Stewart	Marty Rabjohns	Australia	5:42.62	QA
4	Sebastian Kosiorek; Michał Stawowski; Patryk Brzeziński; Sławomir Kruszkowski; Rafał Hejmej; Marcin Brzeziński; Wojciech Gutorski; Mikołaj Burda	Daniel Trojanowski	Poland	5:42.92	QA
5	Qu Xiaoming; Wang Jingfeng; Liu Zhen; He Yi; Zheng Chuanqi; Zhou Yinan; Zhang Yongqiang; Wang Xiangdang	Zhang Dechang	China	5:42.97	QB
6	Florian Eichner; Sebastian Schmidt; Matthias Flach; Philipp Naruhn; Jochen Urban; Florian Mennigen; Kristof Wilke; Andreas Penkner	Peter Thiede	Germany	5:47.05	QB

=== Finals ===
==== Final B ====
Rank	Rowers	Coxswain	Nation	Time
7	Qu Xiaoming; Wang Jingfeng; Liu Zhen; He Yi; Zheng Chuanqi; Zhou Yinan; Zhang Yongqiang; Wang Xiangdang	Zhang Dechang	China	5:34.59
8	Florian Eichner; Sebastian Schmidt; Matthias Flach; Philipp Naruhn; Jochen Urban; Florian Mennigen; Kristof Wilke; Andreas Penkner	Peter Thiede	Germany	5:36.89

==== Final A ====
The winners of the heats, Canada and Great Britain, took the gold and silver medals; the winner of the repechage, United States, took the bronze.

Canada's Olympic M8+ rowing championship followed their 2007 World M8+ Rowing Championship, making the Canadian crew the first world champion in 35 years to follow up with Olympic gold. Canada finished in 5:23.89, about four seconds off the world record time of 5:19.85 set by the U.S. team during the second heat of the Men's eight at the 2004 Summer Olympics in Athens."

Rank	Rowers	Coxswain	Nation	Time
1st place, gold medalist(s)	Kevin Light; Ben Rutledge; Andrew Byrnes; Jake Wetzel; Malcolm Howard; Dominic Seiterle; Adam Kreek; Kyle Hamilton	Brian Price	Canada	5:23.89
2nd place, silver medalist(s)	Alex Partridge; Tom Stallard; Tom Lucy; Richard Egington; Josh West; Alastair Heathcote; Matt Langridge; Colin Smith	Acer Nethercott	Great Britain	5:25.11
3rd place, bronze medalist(s)	Beau Hoopman; Matt Schnobrich; Micah Boyd; Wyatt Allen; Dan Walsh; Steven Coppola; Josh Inman; Bryan Volpenhein	Marcus McElhenney	United States	5:25.34
4	Olivier Siegelaar; Rogier Blink; Meindert Klem; Jozef Klaassen; David Kuiper; Mitchel Steenman; Olaf van Andel; Diederik Simon	Peter Wiersum	Netherlands	5:29.26
5	Sebastian Kosiorek; Michał Stawowski; Patryk Brzeziński; Sławomir Kruszkowski; Rafał Hejmej; Marcin Brzeziński; Wojciech Gutorski; Mikołaj Burda	Daniel Trojanowski	Poland	5:31.42
6	David Dennis; Samuel Loch; James Chapman; Tom Laurich; Jeremy Stevenson; James Tomkins; Sam Conrad; Stephen Stewart	Marty Rabjohns	Australia	5:35.10
