= Rowing at the 2008 Summer Olympics =

Rowing at the Games of the XXIX Olympiad
- Venue: Shunyi Olympic Rowing-Canoeing Park
- Dates: 9–17 August 2008
- Competitors: 555 from 60 nations

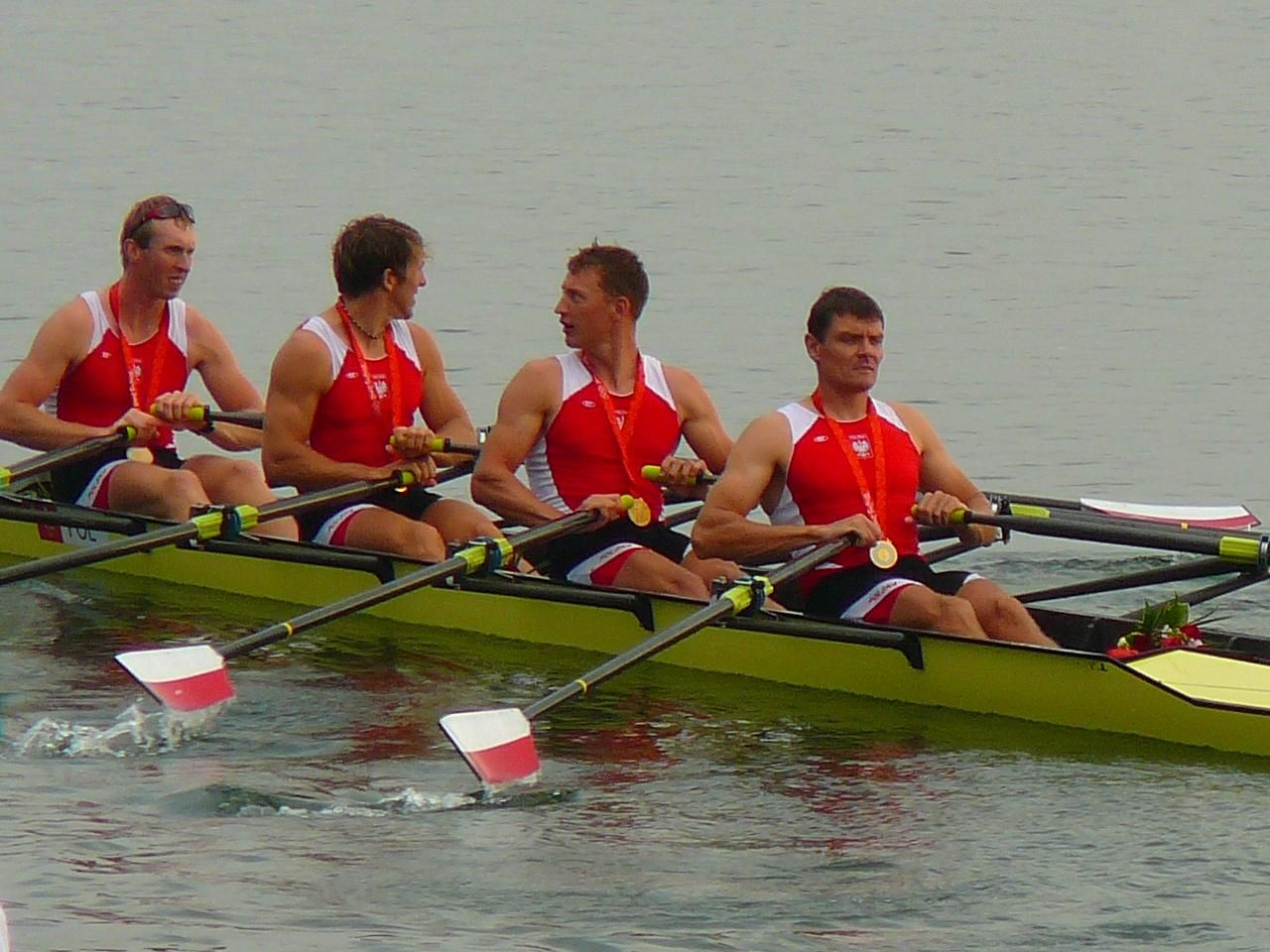
Polish men's quadruple sculls: gold medalists

Rowing competitions at the 2008 Summer Olympics in Beijing were held from August 9 to August 17, at the Shunyi Olympic Rowing-Canoeing Park.

== Medal table ==
* Host nation (China)

Rank	Nation	Gold	Silver	Bronze	Total
1	Great Britain	2	2	2	6
2	Australia	2	1	0	3
3	Canada	1	1	2	4
4	United States	1	1	1	3
5	China*	1	1	0	2
5	Netherlands	1	1	0	2
5	Poland	1	1	0	2
8	New Zealand	1	0	2	3
9	Denmark	1	0	1	2
9	Romania	1	0	1	2
11	Bulgaria	1	0	0	1
11	Norway	1	0	0	1
13	Germany	0	1	1	2
14	Czech Republic	0	1	0	1
14	Estonia	0	1	0	1
14	Finland	0	1	0	1
14	Greece	0	1	0	1
14	Italy	0	1	0	1
19	Belarus	0	0	2	2
19	France	0	0	2	2
Totals (20 entries)		14	14	14	42

== Medal summary ==
=== Men's events ===
Games	Gold	Silver	Bronze
Single sculls	Olaf Tufte; Norway	Ondřej Synek; Czech Republic	Mahé Drysdale; New Zealand
Double sculls	Australia; David Crawshay; Scott Brennan	Estonia; Tõnu Endrekson; Jüri Jaanson	Great Britain; Matthew Wells; Stephen Rowbotham
Quadruple sculls	Poland; Konrad Wasielewski; Marek Kolbowicz; Michał Jeliński; Adam Korol	Italy; Luca Agamennoni; Simone Venier; Rossano Galtarossa; Simone Raineri	France; Jonathan Coeffic; Pierre-Jean Peltier; Julien Bahain; Cédric Berrest
Coxless pair	Australia; Drew Ginn; Duncan Free	Canada; David Calder; Scott Frandsen	New Zealand; Nathan Twaddle; George Bridgewater
Coxless four	Great Britain; Tom James; Steve Williams; Pete Reed; Andrew Triggs Hodge	Australia; Matt Ryan; James Marburg; Cameron McKenzie-McHarg; Francis Hegerty	France; Julien Desprès; Benjamin Rondeau; Germain Chardin; Dorian Mortelette
Coxed eight	Canada; Kevin Light; Ben Rutledge; Andrew Byrnes; Jake Wetzel; Malcolm Howard; Dominic Seiterle; Adam Kreek; Kyle Hamilton; Cox: Brian Price	Great Britain; Alex Partridge; Tom Stallard; Tom Lucy; Richard Egington; Josh West; Alastair Heathcote; Matt Langridge; Colin Smith; Cox: Acer Nethercott	United States; Beau Hoopman; Matt Schnobrich; Micah Boyd; Wyatt Allen; Daniel Walsh; Steven Coppola; Josh Inman; Bryan Volpenhein; Cox: Marcus McElhenney
Lightweight double sculls	Great Britain; Zac Purchase; Mark Hunter	Greece; Dimitrios Mougios; Vasileios Polymeros	Denmark; Mads Rasmussen; Rasmus Quist Hansen
Lightweight coxless four	Denmark; Thomas Ebert; Morten Jørgensen; Mads Andersen; Eskild Ebbesen	Poland; Łukasz Pawłowski; Bartłomiej Pawełczak; Miłosz Bernatajtys; Paweł Rańda	Canada; Iain Brambell; Jon Beare; Mike Lewis; Liam Parsons

=== Women's events ===
Games	Gold	Silver	Bronze
Single sculls	Rumyana Neykova; Bulgaria	Michelle Guerette; United States	Ekaterina Karsten; Belarus
Double sculls	New Zealand; Georgina Evers-Swindell; Caroline Evers-Swindell	Germany; Annekatrin Thiele; Christiane Huth	Great Britain; Elise Laverick; Anna Bebington
Quadruple sculls	China; Tang Bin; Jin Ziwei; Xi Aihua; Zhang Yangyang	Great Britain; Annabel Vernon; Debbie Flood; Frances Houghton; Katherine Grainger	Germany; Britta Oppelt; Manuela Lutze; Kathrin Boron; Stephanie Schiller
Coxless pair	Romania; Georgeta Damian; Viorica Susanu	China; Wu You; Gao Yulan	Belarus; Yuliya Bichyk; Natallia Helakh
Coxed eight	United States; Erin Cafaro; Lindsay Shoop; Anna Goodale; Elle Logan; Anna Cummins; Susan Francia; Caroline Lind; Caryn Davies cox: Mary Whipple	Netherlands; Femke Dekker; Marlies Smulders; Nienke Kingma; Roline Repelaer van Driel; Annemarieke van Rumpt; Helen Tanger; Sarah Siegelaar; Annemiek de Haan cox: Ester Workel	Romania; Constanța Burcică; Viorica Susanu; Rodica Şerban; Enikő Barabás; Simona Muşat; Ioana Papuc; Georgeta Andrunache; Doina Ignat cox: Elena Georgescu
Lightweight double sculls	Netherlands; Kirsten van der Kolk; Marit van Eupen	Finland; Minna Nieminen; Sanna Stén	Canada; Tracy Cameron; Melanie Kok

== See also ==
- Rowing at the 2008 Summer Paralympics
