= Rowing at the 2010 Asian Games – Men's eight =

Men's eight at the 2010 Asian Games
- Venue: Guangzhou International Rowing Centre
- Date: 15–19 November 2010
- Competitors: 36 from 4 nations

Medalists
gold medal	China; Zhu Ziqiang, Zhang Fangbing, Xue Feng, Zheng Xiaolong, Guo Xiaobing, Zhou Yinan, Qu Xiaoming, Wang Xiangdang, Zhang Dechang
silver medal	India; Lokesh Kumar, Satish Joshi, Saji Thomas, Jenil Krishnan, Anil Kumar, Ranjit Singh, Rajesh Kumar Yadav, Manjeet Singh, Girraj Singh
bronze medal	Uzbekistan; Zafar Usmonov, Sergey Tyan, Aleksandr Didrih, Damir Naurzaliev, Efim Kuznetsov, Botir Murodov, Yokub Khamzaev, Abdurasul Muhammadiev, Artyom Kudryashov

The men's eight competition at the 2010 Asian Games in Guangzhou, China was held from 15 November to 19 November at the International Rowing Centre.

== Schedule ==
All times are China Standard Time (UTC+08:00)

Date	Time	Event
Monday, 15 November 2010	11:30	Heat
Friday, 19 November 2010	11:45	Final

== Results ==
=== Heat ===
- Qualification: 1–4 → Final (FA)

Rank	Team	Time	Notes
1	China (CHN); Zhu Ziqiang; Zhang Fangbing; Xue Feng; Zheng Xiaolong; Guo Xiaobing; Zhou Yinan; Qu Xiaoming; Wang Xiangdang; Zhang Dechang	5:31.81	FA
2	India (IND); Lokesh Kumar; Satish Joshi; Saji Thomas; Jenil Krishnan; Anil Kumar; Ranjit Singh; Rajesh Kumar Yadav; Manjeet Singh; Girraj Singh	5:52.56	FA
3	Uzbekistan (UZB); Zafar Usmonov; Sergey Tyan; Aleksandr Didrih; Damir Naurzaliev; Efim Kuznetsov; Botir Murodov; Yokub Khamzaev; Abdurasul Muhammadiev; Artyom Kudryashov	6:04.73	FA
4	Iran (IRI); Meisam Johari; Yaser Johari; Abedin Bagherirad; Farzin Rezaei; Fardin Hassanvand; Masoud Mohammadi; Atabak Pishyar; Afshar Heidari; Keyhan Shamsi	6:10.90	FA

=== Final ===
Rank	Team	Time
1st place, gold medalist(s)	China (CHN); Zhu Ziqiang; Zhang Fangbing; Xue Feng; Zheng Xiaolong; Guo Xiaobing; Zhou Yinan; Qu Xiaoming; Wang Xiangdang; Zhang Dechang	5:37.44
2nd place, silver medalist(s)	India (IND); Lokesh Kumar; Satish Joshi; Saji Thomas; Jenil Krishnan; Anil Kumar; Ranjit Singh; Rajesh Kumar Yadav; Manjeet Singh; Girraj Singh	5:49.50
3rd place, bronze medalist(s)	Uzbekistan (UZB); Zafar Usmonov; Sergey Tyan; Aleksandr Didrih; Damir Naurzaliev; Efim Kuznetsov; Botir Murodov; Yokub Khamzaev; Abdurasul Muhammadiev; Artyom Kudryashov	5:55.96
4	Iran (IRI); Meisam Johari; Yaser Johari; Abedin Bagherirad; Farzin Rezaei; Fardin Hassanvand; Masoud Mohammadi; Atabak Pishyar; Afshar Heidari; Keyhan Shamsi	6:14.28
