= Rowing at the 2006 Asian Games – Men's coxless four =

Men's coxless four at the 2006 Asian Games
- Venue: West Bay Lagoon
- Date: 3–7 December 2006
- Competitors: 44 from 11 nations

Medalists
| gold medal | Japan; Yu Kataoka, Yuya Higashiyama, Rokuroh Okumura, Yoshinori Sato |
| silver medal | India; Dharmesh Sangwan, Jenil Krishnan, Sukhjeet Singh, Satish Joshi |
| bronze medal | Indonesia; Thomas Hallatu, Sumardi, Jamaluddin, Iswandi |

The men's coxless four competition at the 2006 Asian Games in Doha was held from 3 December to 7 December at the West Bay Lagoon.

Since Doha was scarce of water the distance had to be shortened from standard 2000 meters to 1000 meters.

== Schedule ==
All times are Arabia Standard Time (UTC+03:00)

| Date | Time | Event |
|---|---|---|
| Sunday, 3 December 2006 | 16:10 | Heats |
| Monday, 4 December 2006 | 15:20 | Repechages |
| Tuesday, 5 December 2006 | 15:40 | Semifinals |
| Thursday, 7 December 2006 | 10:20 | Finals |

== Results ==
=== Heats ===
- Qualification: 1–2 → Semifinals A/B (SA/B), 3–4 → Repechages (R)

==== Heat 1 ====
| Rank | Team | Time | Notes |
|---|---|---|---|
| 1 | Japan (JPN); Yu Kataoka; Yuya Higashiyama; Rokuroh Okumura; Yoshinori Sato | 3:27.72 | SA/B |
| 2 | South Korea (KOR); Cho Il-keun; Jun Jae-woo; Kwon Hyuk-jung; Han Chang-hun | 3:32.42 | SA/B |
| 3 | North Korea (PRK); Jo Wan-guk; Jong Hyon-chol; Pak Song-min; Ri Sok-bong | 3:35.21 | R |
| 4 | Vietnam (VIE); Vũ Đình Quyền; Nguyễn Đình Huy; Nguyễn Hoàng Anh; Nguyễn Văn Nguyên | 3:45.63 | R |

==== Heat 2 ====
| Rank | Team | Time | Notes |
|---|---|---|---|
| 1 | China (CHN); Cui Yonghui; Su Hui; Zheng Chuanqi; He Yi | 3:20.81 | SA/B |
| 2 | Uzbekistan (UZB); Aleksandr Didrih; Vitaliy Silayev; Roman Astashyov; Sergey Tyan | 3:25.04 | SA/B |
| 3 | Kazakhstan (KAZ); Alexandr Tremassov; Dmitriy Divkov; Ivan Shtanko; Dmitriy Filimonov | 3:27.96 | R |
| 4 | Pakistan (PAK); Sabir Ahmed; Muhammad Asad Khan; Naimat Karim; Muhammad Adeel Sultan | 3:41.30 | R |

==== Heat 3 ====
| Rank | Team | Time | Notes |
|---|---|---|---|
| 1 | India (IND); Dharmesh Sangwan; Jenil Krishnan; Sukhjeet Singh; Satish Joshi | 3:21.03 | SA/B |
| 2 | Indonesia (INA); Thomas Hallatu; Sumardi; Jamaluddin; Iswandi | 3:28.84 | SA/B |
| 3 | Iran (IRI); Amin Gilanpour; Mahmoud Piltan; Arman Mokhtaba; Shahin Zareei | 3:46.19 | R |

=== Repechages ===
- Qualification: 1 → Semifinals A/B (SA/B), 2–3 → Final C (FC)

==== Repechage 1 ====
| Rank | Team | Time | Notes |
|---|---|---|---|
| 1 | North Korea (PRK); Jo Wan-guk; Jong Hyon-chol; Pak Song-min; Ri Sok-bong | 3:02.75 | SA/B |
| 2 | Pakistan (PAK); Sabir Ahmed; Muhammad Asad Khan; Naimat Karim; Muhammad Adeel Sultan | 3:08.50 | FC |
| 3 | Iran (IRI); Amin Gilanpour; Mahmoud Piltan; Arman Mokhtaba; Shahin Zareei | 3:17.10 | FC |

==== Repechage 2 ====
| Rank | Team | Time | Notes |
|---|---|---|---|
| 1 | Kazakhstan (KAZ); Alexandr Tremassov; Dmitriy Divkov; Ivan Shtanko; Dmitriy Filimonov | 3:02.34 | SA/B |
| 2 | Vietnam (VIE); Vũ Đình Quyền; Nguyễn Đình Huy; Nguyễn Hoàng Anh; Nguyễn Văn Nguyên | 3:11.29 | FC |

=== Semifinals ===
- Qualification: 1–2 → Final A (FA), 3–4 → Final B (FB)

==== Semifinal A/B 1 ====
| Rank | Team | Time | Notes |
|---|---|---|---|
| 1 | India (IND); Dharmesh Sangwan; Jenil Krishnan; Sukhjeet Singh; Satish Joshi | 2:50.51 | FA |
| 2 | Japan (JPN); Yu Kataoka; Yuya Higashiyama; Rokuroh Okumura; Yoshinori Sato | 2:52.05 | FA |
| 3 | Uzbekistan (UZB); Aleksandr Didrih; Vitaliy Silayev; Roman Astashyov; Sergey Tyan | 2:57.87 | FB |
| 4 | North Korea (PRK); Jo Wan-guk; Jong Hyon-chol; Pak Song-min; Ri Sok-bong | 2:58.11 | FB |

==== Semifinal A/B 2 ====
| Rank | Team | Time | Notes |
|---|---|---|---|
| 1 | China (CHN); Cui Yonghui; Su Hui; Zheng Chuanqi; He Yi | 2:52.13 | FA |
| 2 | Indonesia (INA); Thomas Hallatu; Sumardi; Jamaluddin; Iswandi | 2:52.56 | FA |
| 3 | Kazakhstan (KAZ); Alexandr Tremassov; Dmitriy Divkov; Ivan Shtanko; Dmitriy Filimonov | 2:58.61 | FB |
| 4 | South Korea (KOR); Cho Il-keun; Jun Jae-woo; Kwon Hyuk-jung; Han Chang-hun | 2:59.79 | FB |

=== Finals ===
==== Final C ====
| Rank | Team | Time |
|---|---|---|
| 1 | Vietnam (VIE); Vũ Đình Quyền; Nguyễn Đình Huy; Nguyễn Hoàng Anh; Nguyễn Văn Nguyên | 3:20.44 |
| 2 | Pakistan (PAK); Sabir Ahmed; Muhammad Asad Khan; Naimat Karim; Muhammad Adeel Sultan | 3:30.01 |
| 3 | Iran (IRI); Amin Gilanpour; Mahmoud Piltan; Arman Mokhtaba; Shahin Zareei | 3:33.80 |

==== Final B ====
| Rank | Team | Time |
|---|---|---|
| 1 | Uzbekistan (UZB); Aleksandr Didrih; Vitaliy Silayev; Roman Astashyov; Sergey Tyan | 3:22.89 |
| 2 | South Korea (KOR); Cho Il-keun; Jun Jae-woo; Kwon Hyuk-jung; Han Chang-hun | 3:24.16 |
| 3 | Kazakhstan (KAZ); Alexandr Tremassov; Dmitriy Divkov; Ivan Shtanko; Dmitriy Filimonov | 3:25.11 |
| 4 | North Korea (PRK); Jo Wan-guk; Jong Hyon-chol; Pak Song-min; Ri Sok-bong | 3:27.72 |

==== Final A ====
| Rank | Team | Time |
|---|---|---|
| 1st place, gold medalist(s) | Japan (JPN); Yu Kataoka; Yuya Higashiyama; Rokuroh Okumura; Yoshinori Sato | 3:04.48 |
| 2nd place, silver medalist(s) | India (IND); Dharmesh Sangwan; Jenil Krishnan; Sukhjeet Singh; Satish Joshi | 3:08.98 |
| 3rd place, bronze medalist(s) | Indonesia (INA); Thomas Hallatu; Sumardi; Jamaluddin; Iswandi | 3:09.83 |
| 4 | China (CHN); Cui Yonghui; Su Hui; Zheng Chuanqi; He Yi | 3:09.98 |
