= Bryan Volpenhein =

American rower

Personal information
- Full name: Bryan Daniel Volpenhein
- Born: August 18, 1976 (age 49) Cincinnati, Ohio, United States
- Education: Ohio State University
- Occupation: Rowing Coach
- Employer: Oklahoma City University Men's and Women's rowing Team
- Height: 6 ft 3 in (1.91 m)
- Weight: 215 lb (98 kg)
Medal record
Men's rowing
Representing the United States
Olympic Games
Gold medal – first place	2004 Athens	Men's eight
Bronze medal – third place	2008 Beijing	Men's eight
World Championships
Gold medal – first place	1998 Cologne	Men's eight
Gold medal – first place	1999 St. Catharine's	Men's eight
Gold medal – first place	2005 Gifu	Men's eight
Silver medal – second place	2003 Milan	Men's eight
Bronze medal – third place	2002 Seville	Men's eight
World Cup
Gold medal – first place	2001 Princeton	Men's eight
Gold medal – first place	2002 Lucerne	Men's eight
Gold medal – first place	2004 Lucerne	Men's four

Bryan Volpenhein (born August 18, 1976), is an American rower. He is a three-time Olympian, having participated in the 2000, 2004 and 2008 Summer Olympics.

Originally from Cincinnati, Volpenhein graduated from Kings High School in Kings Mills, Ohio and attended Ohio State University, where he rowed for The Ohio State University Crew Club alongside coach John Gutrich; former Purdue lightweight rower, and coached by Tim Carrigg and Lou Renzulli. He graduated in 2002. Following the 2005 World Rowing Championships, he studied culinary arts at The Art Institute of Seattle.

== Rowing career ==
Volpenhein is the only two-time winner (in 2002 and 2004) of the USRowing Male Athlete of the Year award. In addition, he and his team were named "USATODAY.com's U.S. Olympic Athlete of the Week" following their Olympic gold medal win in 2004. Volpenhein won bronze in the men's eight at the 2008 Olympics.

Volpenhein became the head coach of the University of Pennsylvania Men's Heavyweight Rowing Team in the 2019–2020 season. Volpenhein was previously the Training and Technical Director at the University of San Diego Men's Rowing team for the 2018–2019 season and the Junior Men's Varsity Head Coach at the San Diego Rowing Club in 2019. In August 2022, Volpenhein resigned his position at the University of Pennsylvania, so that his family could relocate to support his wife Sarah Trowbridge's move to be head coach of The University of Oklahoma Women's Rowing team. As of June 2024 Volpenhein became the head coach of the men's and women's rowing programs at Oklahoma City University, returning to the sport after a brief hiatus of being a full-time father of two.
