= He Yi =

He Yi may refer to:

- He Yi (Yellow Turban rebel)
- He Yi (rower)
- He Jianjun, Chinese film director and screenwriter, occasionally credited under the name He Yi
- Yi He, a Chinese cryptocurrency executive
