= Reinder Lubbers =

Dutch rower

Reinder Lubbers (born 6 November 1984 in Deventer) is a male rower from the Netherlands.

The son of former Dutch cricket team captain Steven Lubbers, Lubbers took part in the World Championships of 2007 in Munich becoming fifth in the coxed four.

In 2008, he claimed a seat in the Dutch eights team, the Holland Acht, competing at multiple World Cup regattas. He joined the Dutch eights team (Olaf van Andel, Rogier Blink, Jozef Klaassen, Meindert Klem, David Kuiper, Diederik Simon, Olivier Siegelaar, Mitchel Steenman and cox Peter Wiersum) to the 2008 Summer Olympics in Beijing as a reserve. Due to an injury of Siegelaar, Lubbers was able to take part in the repechage and helped the team to advance to the final of the tournament.

Lubbers was a member of the Groningen Student Rowing Club (GSR) Aegir as a student, switching to the Koninklijke Amsterdamse Roei & Zeilvereniging "de Hoop" after studies.

== Sports post-rowing ==
Born in a cricketing family, Lubbers became champion of the Dutch Cricket League in 2011 with club VRA Amsterdam, together with his younger brother Victor.

== Professional career ==
After his rowing career, Lubbers became an investor, working at Kempen & Co.
