= Craig Amerkhanian =

American rower

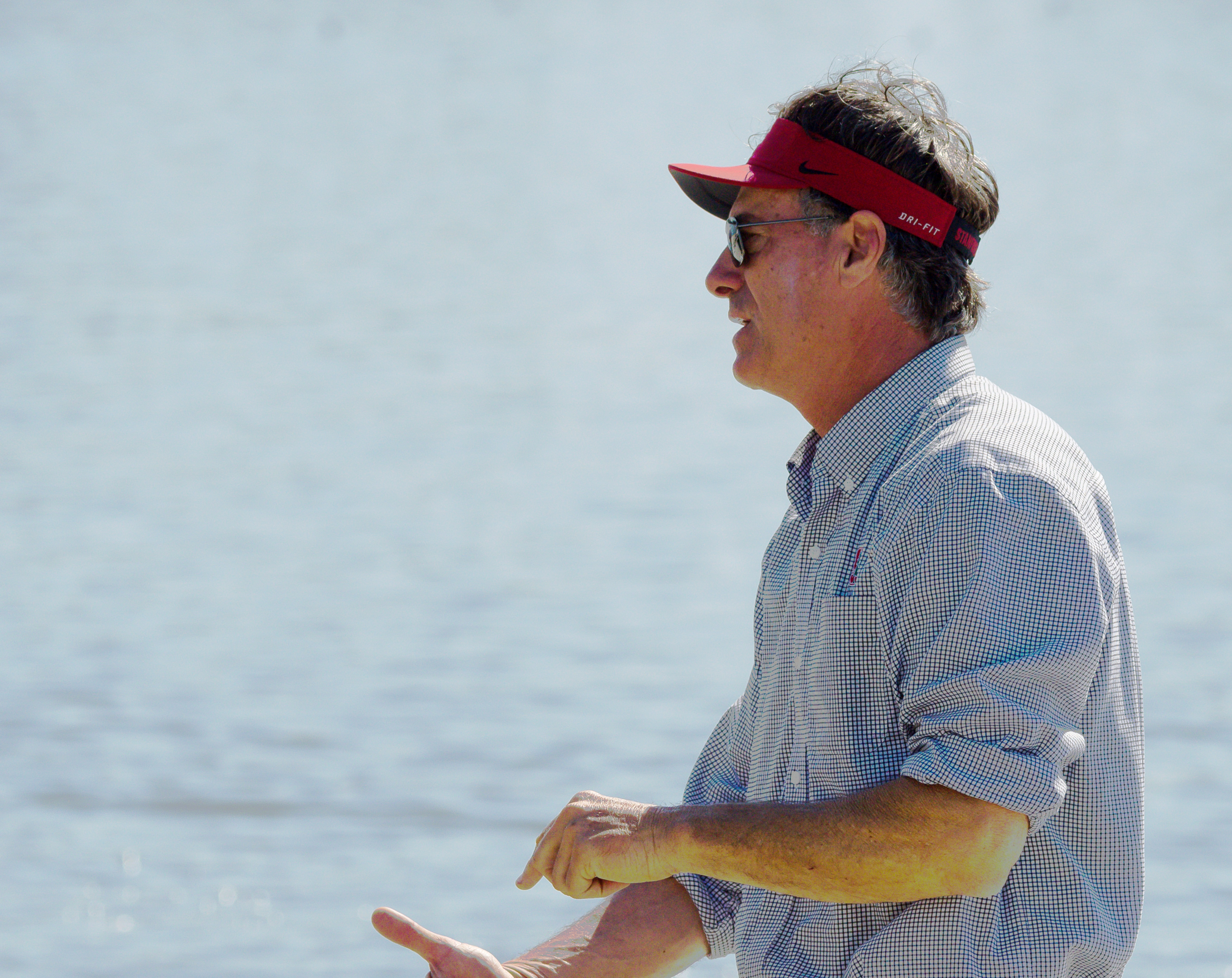
Stanford Men's Rowing head coach, 2000 - 2019

Craig Amerkhanian is a Pac-10 college champion oarsman and rowing coach at Stanford University. Amerkhanian also has placed numerous athletes on National, Olympic and "Boat Race" (Oxford/Cambridge) teams. He was an All-Pac-10 oarsman at University of California Berkeley and graduated in 1980 with a degree in History. He received his master's degree in education in 1993.

Coach Amerkhanian left Stanford in the spring of 2019, coaching the Cardinal for 19 years on the waters of Redwood Creek. Stanford men’s rowing accomplished unprecedented results: 27 Under 23 USA Stanford National men’s rowing team members, 8 USA Olympians, 1 Canadian Olympian, Back to back San Diego Crew Classic Copley Cup Champions, three Head of the Charles Championship four gold medals, three straight IRA Finals in the Varsity 8- fifth in 2008, third in 2009, second in 2007. Amerkhanian continued to inspire until his last day, quoting Springsteen, the Craig Files, and standing strong as the team embraced the working life that is Stanford Crew.

== Career ==
=== Rowing success ===
After rowing for two years at Orange Coast College, Amerkhanian raced in the Cal varsity eight in 1979 and '80. The '79 team won the Pac-10 championship well as the Opening Day Regatta on the Montlake Cut. The crew traveled to Henley (Cal's first trip since the '48 Olympic crew) and raced in the Grand Challenge Cup. In 1980 the crew was undefeated again throughout the dual racing season.

=== Early career ===
In the fall of 1980, Amerkhanian began a five-year stint with the Oakland Athletics Baseball Co., working with Roy Eisenhardt ('80 Cal frosh coach and A's president). He then worked in the mortgage industry while earning his master's degree in education. Amerkhanian has taught social studies and English in the Oakland and San Ramon school districts.

=== At Cal ===
Amerkhanian's coaching career began at University of California, Berkeley in 1992 when he became the coach of the freshman team, working under his former coach at Cal, Steve Gladstone. The classes of athletes that Amerkhanian recruited during the mid- to late-'90s began a rowing dynasty at Cal. Amerkhanian-coached crews had great success at the IRA national championship regatta, winning gold in '98 and 2000, silver in '99 and '96, and a fourth-place finish in 1997. His freshman crews also won Pac-10 titles in 1994, '95, '96, '98, '99, and 2000.

=== At Stanford ===
After his victorious season with the Cal frosh in 2000, Amerkhanian accepted an offer to become the Director of Stanford's Rowing Program. Amerkhanian takes the lion's share of credit for building a successful rowing program at the University. By 2005, the team included two athletes who had rowed in the 2004 Athens Olympics and another who would go on to compete in Beijing in 2008. Amerkhanian coached four members of the team that competed in the London 2012 Olympics. Coach Amerkhanian was named Pac-10 coach of the year in both 2006 and 2010. Stanford's team under Amerkhanian's leadership has won national titles at the IRA championship regatta in the freshman 4+, varsity 4+, and 2- events, earned silver (2007) and bronze (2009) in the varsity 8+ event, and won the Copley Cup at the San Diego Crew Classic in 2006 and 2007.

== Past athletes coached ==
Amerkhanian has coached many Olympic athletes, including:

- David Banks (rower)
- Jacob Cornelius
- Austin Hack
- Scott Frandsen
- Adam Kreek
- Alexander Osborne
- Silas Stafford
- Jamie Schroeder
- Nils-Torolv Simonsen
- Luke Walton (rower)
- Jake Wetzel

== See also ==
- The Boat Race
- World Rowing Championships
- College rowing (United States)
