= Zhang Shunyin =

Chinese rower

Personal information
- Nationality: Chinese
- Born: 14 March 1984 (age 41); Sichuan, China

Sport
- Sport: Rowing

Zhang Shunyin (born 15 March 1984) is a Chinese rower. He competed in the men's eight event at the 2008 Summer Olympics.
