= Olaf van Andel =

Dutch rower

Personal information
- Born: 22 March 1984 (age 42) Tilburg, Netherlands
- Height: 193 cm (6 ft 4 in)
- Weight: 90 kg (198 lb)
Medal record
Men's rowing
Representing Netherlands
World Championships
Bronze medal – third place	2009 Poznań	Eight

Olaf van Andel (born 22 March 1984 in Tilburg) is a rower from the Netherlands.

Van Andel took part in the World Championships of 2007 in Munich becoming fifth in the coxed fours. He qualified for the 2008 Summer Olympics in Beijing with the Dutch eights forming a team with Rogier Blink, Jozef Klaassen, Meindert Klem, David Kuiper, Diederik Simon, Olivier Siegelaar, Mitchel Steenman and cox Peter Wiersum. Due to an injury Siegelaar was replaced by Reinder Lubbers during the tournament.
