= Peter Wiersum =

Dutch rower

Personal information
- Full name: Peter Noel Jan Wiersum
- Nationality: Dutch
- Born: 1 November 1984 (age 41) Sutton Coldfield, England
- Height: 173 cm (5 ft 8 in)
- Weight: 55 kg (121 lb)
Medal record
Men's rowing
Representing the Netherlands
Olympic Games
Bronze medal – third place	2016 Rio de Janeiro	M8+
World Championships
Gold medal – first place	2007 Munich	LM8+
Bronze medal – third place	2009 Poznań	M8+
Bronze medal – third place	2015 Aiguebelette	M8+
European Championships
Silver medal – second place	2013 Sevilla	M8+

Peter Noel Jan Wiersum (born 1 November 1984 in Sutton Coldfield) is a Dutch former rowing coxswain. He is a three-time Olympian and won a world championship title in 2007.

He competed in the 2007 World Rowing Championships in Munich and steered the Dutch lightweight eights to the World title. He qualified for the 2008 Summer Olympics in Beijing with the Dutch eight made up by Olaf van Andel, Rogier Blink, Jozef Klaassen, Meindert Klem, David Kuiper, Diederik Simon, Olivier Siegelaar and Mitchel Steenman. Due to an injury, Siegelaar was replaced by Reinder Lubbers during the tournament.

At the 2016 Summer Olympics in Rio de Janeiro he coxed the Dutch men's eight that won a bronze medal.
