= Olivier Siegelaar =

Dutch rower (born 1986)

Personal information
- Full name: Olivier Floris Johannes Siegelaar
- Nationality: Dutch
- Born: 24 October 1986 in Haarlem, Netherlands
- Height: 197 cm (6 ft 6 in)
- Weight: 100 kg (220 lb)
Medal record
Men's rowing
Representing the Netherlands
Olympic Games
Bronze medal – third place	2016 Rio de Janeiro	M8+
World Championships
Bronze medal – third place	2009 Poznan	M8+
Bronze medal – third place	2015 Aiguebelette	M8+

Olivier Floris Johannes Siegelaar (born 24 October 1986 in Haarlem) is a rower from the Netherlands.

Siegelaar qualified for the 2008 Summer Olympics in Beijing with the Dutch eights forming a team with Olaf van Andel, Jozef Klaassen, Meindert Klem, David Kuiper, Diederik Simon, Rogier Blink, Mitchel Steenman and cox Peter Wiersum. Due to an injury Siegelaar was replaced by Reinder Lubbers during the repechages. He was back in the boat during the final and finished 4th.

Siegelaar rowed in the men's eight during the 2009, 2010 and 2011 World Championships finishing 3rd, 4th and 6th respectively, before competing at the 2012 Summer Olympics in London. In a close race Siegelaar finished 5th, only 0.5 seconds off the bronze medal. At the 2016 Summer Olympics in Rio de Janeiro he was part of the men's eight team that won a bronze medal.

During his rowing career, Siegelaar pursued a degree in Mechanical Engineering between 2009 and 2013 at the University of California, Berkeley, where he competed for the Cal Golden Bears. He rowed three times (2009, 2010, 2011) in the Varsity eight during the IRA National Championships and won silver, gold and bronze respectively.

After the 2016 Summer Olympics in Rio de Janeiro, Siegelaar earned a Master of Business Administration at Saïd Business School in Oxford and in the same year won The Boat Race for OUBC.
