= Wang Jingfeng =

Chinese rower

Personal information
- Nationality: Chinese
- Born: 1 October 1979 (age 45); Liaoning, China

Sport
- Sport: Rowing

Wang Jingfeng (born 1 October 1979) is a Chinese rower. He competed in the men's eight event at the 2008 Summer Olympics.
