= Hardy Cubasch =

Australian rower

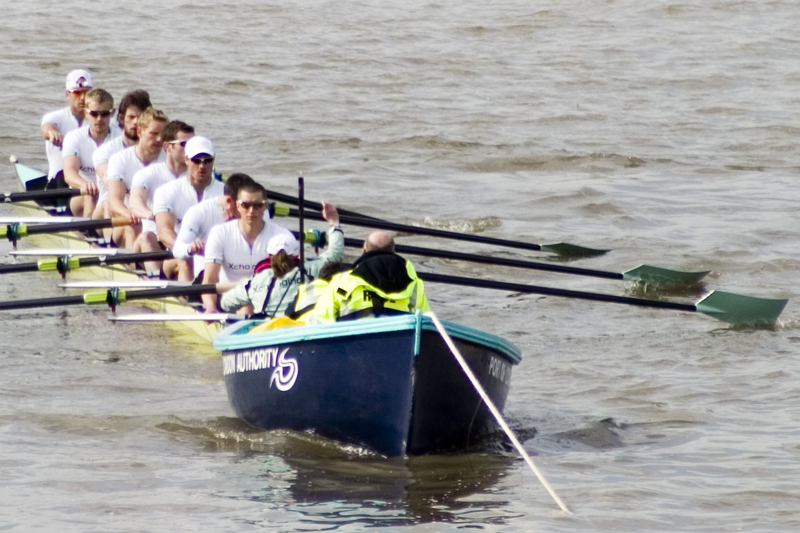
- Cubasch (white hat, six seat) Cambridge crew in the 2009 Boat Race

Personal information
- Born: 27 October 1980 (age 45)

Sport
- Sport: Rowing
- Club: Queensland University Boat Club

Achievements and titles
- National finals: King's Cup 2001-2008
Medal record
Men's rowing
Representing Australia
World Championships
Gold medal – first place	2005 Gifu	M2+
World Rowing U23 Championships
Silver medal – second place	2000 U23 Copenhagen	M8+

Hardy Cubasch (born 27 October 1980) is an Australian former national champion and world champion rower.

== Club and state rowing ==
Cubasch's senior rowing was done from the Queensland University Boat Club. He completed a B.Commerce at the University of Queensland by 2002.

He was first selected to represent Queensland in the men's youth eight who contested the Noel F Wilkinson Trophy in the Interstate Regatta within the 1998 Australian Rowing Championships. He raced again in the Queensland youth eight in 1999. On seven occasions between 2001 and 2008 he rowed in the Queensland senior men's eight contesting the King's Cup at the Australian Interstate Regatta.

In Queensland University colours and racing with his world championship partner Sam Conrad, Cubasch contested national titles at the Australian Rowing Championships. In 2005 they won the Australian men's pair and men's coxless four national titles. They contested those same national titles in 2006 and in a composite selection trial crew with Drew Ginn and David Crawshay from Mercantile they won the Australian men's coxless four championship and were presented with the Bob Aitken Memorial Trophy in the first year it was awarded for that event. In 2008 he contested the Australian national title for a coxed four finishing in second place.

In 2009 Cubasch rowed in the Oxford and Cambridge Boat Race seated at six in the Cambridge eight. The following year he was still rowing at Cambridge but was kept out of the main boat by a tendinitis injury in his wrist. He raced in their reserve boat Goldie for a victory against Isis, the reserve Oxford eight. While at Cambridge he completed a M.Arts by 2011 and again rowed in the Cambridge eight in the 2011 Boat Race.

== International representative rowing ==
Cubasch was first selected to represent Australia in a men's junior coxed four at the 1998 Junior World Rowing Championships in Linz Ottensheim, Austria. That four placed fifth.

In 2000 he was selected in the Australian men's eight who contested the World Rowing U23 Championships in Copenhagen. The Australian eight raced well but found the fancied German boat take a massive three second lead by the 1000m mark and stretched it further by the 1500. The Australians clawed some of that lead back in the last 500m but did well to keep the fast finishing US crew at bay. At the finish the Australian eight held the US crew out by .07seconds to claim the silver medal.

Cubasch next figured in an Australian representative crew in 2005 when he was picked to race a coxed pair at the 2005 World Rowing Championships in Gifu, Japan with Sam Conrad at stroke and Marc Douez up front. The pair led the race from start to finish and claimed Australia's second ever World Championship title in that boat class. It was Cubasch's last representative regatta in Australian green and gold.
