= Matt Schnobrich =

American rower (born 1978)

Personal information
- Born: November 12, 1978 (age 47)
- Height: 6 ft 5 in (196 cm)
- Weight: 205 lb (93 kg)
Medal record
Men's rowing
Representing United States
Olympic Games
Bronze medal – third place	2008 Beijing	Eights

Matt Schnobrich (/ˈʃnoʊbrɪk/ SHNOH-brik; born November 12, 1978) is a competitive rower from Minnesota. He received an Olympic bronze medal a member of the United States Men's Eight in the rowing events of the 2008 Summer Olympics in Beijing.

Schnobrich was raised in Saint Paul, and attended Saint Thomas Academy in Mendota Heights, where he competed in cross-country skiing. After graduation he went on to Saint John's University in Collegeville, Minnesota in 2001. He had never rowed competitively before, but took up the sport on the idyllic Lake Sagatagan in Stearns County on the campus of Saint John's.

Upon graduating from college he went on to earn a master's degree in engineering from the University of Minnesota. He continued to row on the Mississippi River, with the Minneapolis Rowing Club and University of Minnesota Men's Crew.

The 6'5" Schnobrich is a four-time national team member who won the pair at the 2008 U.S. Olympic Trials, won the pair at the third 2007 National Selection Regatta, won the pair at the 2006 USRowing Fall Speed Order, won the eight at the 2006 Head of the Charles, and won the pair at the 2005 National Team Trials.

== See also ==
- "Matt Schnobrich", Athlete Bios from USRowing. June 12, 2008.
- Dan Timm, "Rowing takes Schnobrich to China". New Ulm Journal, July 8, 2008.
