= Jeremy Stevenson (rower) =

Australian rower

Personal information
- Nationality: Australian
- Born: 8 December 1986 (age 38); Karratha, Western Australia

Sport
- Sport: Rowing

Jeremy Stevenson (born 8 December 1986) is an Australian rower. He competed in the men's eight event at the 2008 Summer Olympics.
