= Kevin Light =

Canadian rower (born 1979)

Personal information
- Nationality: Canadian
- Born: May 16, 1979 (age 47) Vancouver, British Columbia, Canada
Medal record
Men's rowing
Representing Canada
Olympic Games
Gold medal – first place	2008 Beijing	Eight
World Championships
Gold medal – first place	2002 Seville	Eight
Gold medal – first place	2003 Milan	Eight
Gold medal – first place	2007 Oberschleißheim	Eight
Bronze medal – third place	2006 Dorney	Coxless pair
Bronze medal – third place	2011 Bled	Coxed pair
Nations Cup
Silver medal – second place	2000 Copenhagen	Coxless pair
World Cup
Gold medal – first place	2003 Lucerne	Eight
Gold medal – first place	2004 Oberschleißheim	Eight
Gold medal – first place	2004 Lucerne	Eight
Gold medal – first place	2007 Ottensheim	Eight
Gold medal – first place	2007 Lucerne	Eight
Gold medal – first place	2008 Lucerne	Eight
Silver medal – second place	2006 Oberschleißheim	Coxless pair
Bronze medal – third place	2002 Lucerne	Eight
Henley Royal Regatta
Gold medal – first place	2002 Grand Challenge Cup	Eight
Gold medal – first place	2003 Grand Challenge Cup	Eight
Gold medal – first place	2007 Grand Challenge Cup	Eight

Kevin Richard Light (born May 16, 1979) is a Canadian rower.

== Early life ==
He was born in Vancouver, British Columbia but has lived in Victoria since 1985.

He began rowing in grade 12 at Stelly's Secondary School, from which he graduated in 1997. He was enrolled at the University of Victoria from 1997 until 2001, where he was part of numerous Canadian University Rowing Championships teams. The highlight of his university rowing career came in 2001 when the University of Victoria beat the University of Washington at the Opening Day Regatta.

Light graduated from the Victoria Motion Picture School in 2004/2005 and then the Western Academy of Photography in 2008/2009, where he studied photojournalism.

== Career ==
Light won the gold medal at both the 2002 and 2003 World Rowing Championships in the eight. He competed in the eight at the 2004 Summer Olympics, where he and his crew finished fifth. At the 2006 World Rowing Championships, Light represented Canada along with fellow Victoria rower Malcolm Howard in the men's coxless pair, where they won the bronze medal. In 2007, Light won the gold medal in the eight.

He was named to the Canadian men's eight for the 2008 Summer Olympics, where he won the gold medal with Andrew Byrnes, Kyle Hamilton, Malcolm Howard, Adam Kreek, Ben Rutledge, Dominic Sieterle, Jake Wetzel and cox Brian Price.

In September 2012, he was brought on at Claremont Secondary School as a coach and manager. For his debut as head coach at the CSSRA in St. Catharines, Ontario, Light led the team to gold medals in three different events: the senior women's quad, the junior men's double and the junior men's quad. He coached throughout the next three years, leaving in June 2015.
