= Liu Zhen (rower) =

Chinese rower

Liu Zhen (Chinese: 刘振; pinyin: Liú Zhèn, born 22 June 1982) is a Chinese rower who represented China at the Men's eight competition at the 2008 Summer Olympics.
