= Mitchel Steenman =

Dutch rower

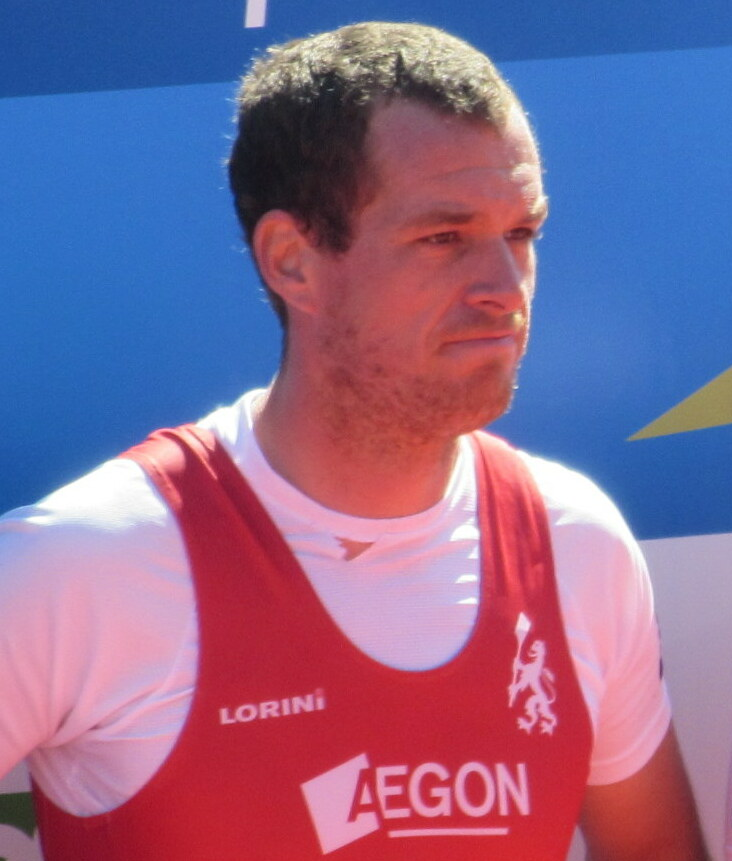
- Steenman at the 2016 European Championships

Personal information
- Born: 17 June 1984 (age 42) Dirksland, Netherlands
- Height: 201 cm (6 ft 7 in)
- Weight: 94 kg (207 lb)
Medal record
Men's rowing
Representing the Netherlands
World Championships
Bronze medal – third place	2009 Poznań	Eight
Bronze medal – third place	2013 Chungjiu	Coxless pair
European Championships
Gold medal – first place	2012 Varese	Coxless pair
Silver medal – second place	2014 Belgrade	Coxless pair
Bronze medal – third place	2013 Seville	Coxless pair
Bronze medal – third place	2016 Brandenburg	Coxless pair

Mitchel Steenman (born 17 June 1984 in Dirksland) is a Dutch rower.

Steenman took part in the World Championships of 2007 in Munich becoming tenth in the eights. He qualified for the 2008 Summer Olympics in Beijing with the Dutch eights forming a team with Olaf van Andel, Jozef Klaassen, Meindert Klem, David Kuiper, Diederik Simon, Olivier Siegelaar, Rogier Blink and cox Peter Wiersum. Due to an injury Siegelaar was replaced by Reinder Lubbers during the tournament.
