= Andreas Penkner =

German rower

Personal information
- Nationality: German
- Born: 29 November 1982 (age 42); Radolfzell, West Germany

Sport
- Sport: Rowing

Andreas Penkner (born 29 November 1982) is a German rower. He competed in the men's eight event at the 2008 Summer Olympics.
