= Jozef Klaassen =

Dutch rower

Personal information
- Full name: Jozef Franciscus Hendrikus Klaassen
- Nationality: Dutch
- Born: 5 March 1983 (age 43) Thames, New Zealand
- Height: 199 cm (6 ft 6 in)
- Weight: 96 kg (212 lb)
Medal record
Men's rowing
Representing Netherlands
World Championships
Bronze medal – third place	2009 Poznań	Eight

Jozef Franciscus Hendrikus Klaassen (born 5 March 1983 in Thames, New Zealand) is a rower from the Netherlands.

Klaassen qualified for the 2008 Summer Olympics in Beijing with the Dutch eights forming a team with Olaf van Andel, Rogier Blink, Meindert Klem, David Kuiper, Diederik Simon, Olivier Siegelaar, Mitchel Steenman and cox Peter Wiersum. Due to an injury Siegelaar was replaced by Reinder Lubbers during the tournament, where the Dutch finished in 4th place. He competed for the Dutch men's eight again at the 2012 Summer Olympics where they finished in 5th place.

Klaassen is 6 ft 6 in (1.98 m) tall. An investment banker, he was a student of Boston University in Finance and Economic, from which he took a sabbatical for a year to train and compete in the Olympics.

His parents are Dutch, which allowed him to row for the Dutch team, although he rankled Dutch fans when he told a New Zealand paper "I'm a Kiwi."
