= David Kuiper =

Dutch rower

Personal information
- Born: 12 December 1980 (age 45) Aduard, Netherlands
- Height: 196 cm (6 ft 5 in)
- Weight: 91 kg (201 lb)
Medal record
Men's rowing
Representing Netherlands
World Championships
Bronze medal – third place	2009 Poznań	Eight
European Championships
Bronze medal – third place	2013 Sevilla	Eight

David Kuiper (born 12 December 1980 in Aduard) is a rower from the Netherlands.

Kuiper took part in the World Championships of 2007 in Munich becoming tenth in the eights. He qualified for the 2008 Summer Olympics in Beijing with the Dutch eights forming a team with Olaf van Andel, Jozef Klaassen, Meindert Klem, Rogier Blink, Diederik Simon, Olivier Siegelaar, Mitchel Steenman and cox Peter Wiersum. Due to an injury, Siegelaar was replaced by Reinder Lubbers during the tournament.

Awards
Preceded by Robert Lathouwers	Rotterdam Sportsman of the Year; 2009	Succeeded by Francisco Elson
