= Zhang Yongqiang =

Chinese rower

Personal information
- Nationality: Chinese
- Born: 19 March 1985 (age 40); Shandong, China

Sport
- Sport: Rowing

Zhang Yongqiang (born 19 March 1985) is a Chinese rower. He competed in the men's eight event at the 2008 Summer Olympics.
