= Rogier Blink =

Dutch rower (born 1982)

Medal record

Men's Rowing

Representing the Netherlands

World Championships
Bronze medal – third place	2013 Chungjiu	Coxless pair

European Championships
Gold medal – first place	2012 Varese	Coxless pair
Silver medal – second place	2014 Belgrade	Coxless pair

Rogier Blink (born 13 January 1982 in Groningen) is a Dutch rower.

Blink took part in the World Championships of 2005 in Munich becoming fifth in the coxed fours. He qualified for the 2008 Summer Olympics in Beijing with the Dutch eights forming a team with Olaf van Andel, Jozef Klaassen, Meindert Klem, David Kuiper, Diederik Simon, Olivier Siegelaar, Mitchel Steenman and cox Peter Wiersum. Due to an injury Siegelaar was replaced by Reinder Lubbers during the tournament.

The Dutch eight he was part of finished in 5th place at London 2012.
