= Sukhjeet Singh (rower) =

Personal information
- Nationality: Indian
- Born: 12 August 1981 (age 45)
- Height: 186 cm (6 ft 1 in)
- Military career
- Allegiance: India
- Branch: Indian Army
- Rank: Havildar

Sport
- Country: India
- Sport: Rowing
Medal record
Representing India
Asian Games
Silver medal – second place	2006 Doha	Men's coxless four
South Asian Games
Gold medal – first place	2006 Colombo	Men's coxless four

Sukhjeet Singh (born 12 August 1981) is an Indian rower and Havildar in Indian Army. He won a gold medal at 10th South Asian Games and a silver medal at 2006 Asian Games in Men's coxless four.
