= Henry Gladstone =

American radio newscaster and actor

Henry Gladstone (c. 1911 — January 22, 1995) was an American radio newscaster and actor. He was a newscaster for WOR (AM) for 32 years; and was notably that station's United Nations correspondent. He also narrated documentaries for The March of Time during World War II.

== Life and career ==
Born in Boston, Gladstone was a graduate of the University of Toronto. He began his career as an actor in Off-Broadway plays in New York during the Great Depression in the early 1930s. He returned to Boston to begin a career in radio on variety shows and news broadcasts; working first with WNAC. In 1935 he became the news announcer for WHDH in Boston, but left there in 1936 to become an announcer for both WNAC and the Yankee Network.

In 1938 Gladstone returned to New York to join the staff of WHN as an announcer. In 1940 he served as the announcer for Jimmy Walker's radio series Jimmy Walker's Opportunity Hour on WHN.

In 1942 Gladstone left WHN to become a news broadcaster for WOR (AM) with whom he remained until his retirement 35 years later in 1977. During World War II he narrated several documentaries for The March of Time, and after the war he worked primarily as WOR's United Nations correspondent.

In 1977 Gladstone moved to San Diego, California where he remained living in retirement until his death in 1995 of heart failure at the age of 83.

Gladstone's son, Steve Gladstone, is the head coach of the men's heavyweight crew at Yale, and is one of the winningest coaches in collegiate rowing history.
