= Micah Boyd =

American rower

Personal information
- Born: April 6, 1982 (age 44)
Medal record
Men's rowing
Representing United States
Olympic Games
Bronze medal – third place	2008 Beijing	Eight
World Rowing Championships
Bronze medal – third place	2005 Gifu	Coxed pairs (M2+)

Micah Boyd (born April 6, 1982) is a male crew rower who qualified for the eight-man rowing competition of the 2008 Summer Olympics in Beijing, competing for the United States.

== Early years ==
Boyd began rowing at the Minnesota Boat Club; where he learned to scull in a double with his identical twin brother, Anders Boyd.

In the summer of 2000, Micah and his brother Anders were invited to the U.S. Junior National Team selection camp, but Micah declined selection to one of the large boats to row the double with his brother, eventually losing at trials. At the 2000 Royal Canadian Henley Regatta, Micah placed second in the Junior (under 19) men's double scull event against future U.S. team teammates Sam Stitt and Giuseppe Lanzone.

Micah graduated from the University of Wisconsin in Natural Resources. With his brother he won the pair at the first 2008 National Selection Regatta. He also won a bronze medal at the 2005 World Rowing Championships as well as the bronze medal in the 2008 Summer Olympics in Beijing.
