= Tom Lucy =

British rower

Medal record

Men's rowing

Representing Great Britain

Olympic Games
Silver medal – second place	2008 Beijing	Eight

Thomas David Lucy (born 1 May 1988 in Bristol) is a British international rower from Llangovan near Monmouth. He won a silver medal at the 2008 Summer Olympics for Great Britain in the Men's eight.

He attended Monmouth School for seven years, starting at age 12, and left the school after completing his A levels at age 18. He left to study in Oxford at Oxford Brookes University.

At 17, he won bronze at the world 2005 junior rowing championships in Brandenburg, Germany, racing in the GB coxless four. A year later, he won gold in the same event at the world juniors in Amsterdam. In 2007, he finished third at the senior British final trials regatta with Colin Smith, earning a place in the GB men's eight that won bronze at the World Cup regatta in Amsterdam and the world championships in Munich, where at 19 he became the second youngest British rower ever to land a senior world championship medal. Called up into the GB flagship four after injury to bowman Tom James, Lucy won gold at the first World Cup regatta of 2008 back on the Munich course, before going on to win World Cup gold in the GB eight in Poznań, Poland, which secured the overall World Cup title for GB, and Olympic silver in Beijing.

On 10 January 2009, Lucy announced he would retire from the sport to fulfil his childhood dream of joining the Royal Marines.

Together with 28 other British Royal Marines officers, Tom became a certified sailor after completing the sailing courses at the American Sailing Academy, Key Largo, Florida in July 2010.

Lucy deployed to Afghanistan in March 2011, leading K company 42 Commando Royal Marines.
