= Ben Rutledge =

Canadian rower (b. 1980)

Personal information
- Born: November 9, 1980 (age 45) Cranbrook, British Columbia
Medal record
Men's rowing
Representing Canada
Olympic Games
Gold medal – first place	2008 Beijing	Eight
World Rowing Championships
Gold medal – first place	2002 Seville	Eight
Gold medal – first place	2003 Milan	Eight
Gold medal – first place	2007 Munich	Eight
World Rowing Cup
Gold medal – first place	2003 Lucerne	Eight
Gold medal – first place	2004 Munich	Eight
Gold medal – first place	2004 Lucerne	Eight
Gold medal – first place	2007 Lucerne	Eight
Gold medal – first place	2008 Lucerne	Eight
Silver medal – second place	2005 Eton	Pair
Bronze medal – third place	2002 Lucerne	Eight
Royal Henley Regatta Grand Challenge Cup
Gold medal – first place	2002	Eight
Gold medal – first place	2003	Eight
Gold medal – first place	2007	Eight
Canadian University Rowing Championships
Gold medal – first place	2005 CURC	Eight
Gold medal – first place	2005 CURC	Pair

Ben Rutledge (born November 9, 1980, in Cranbrook, British Columbia) is a former Canadian Olympic rower and is currently a maths teacher.

In Seville, Spain 2002 he was a member of Canada's inaugural Men's 8+ crew to win a gold medal at a World Championship regatta. He accomplished this task two more times in 2003 and 2007 in Milan, Italy, and Munich, Germany.

His Olympic results include a disappointing fifth-place finish in the men's 8+ at the 2004 Athens Olympics. However, after a hard-fought 4-year comeback, Ben and his teammates Andrew Byrnes, Kyle Hamilton, Malcolm Howard, Adam Kreek, Kevin Light, Dominic Sieterle, Jake Wetzel and cox Brian Price won a gold medal at the 2008 Summer Olympics in Beijing, China.

In 2006 he was the recipient of the Bobby Gaul Memorial Trophy an award presented by the University of British Columbia to the graduating male athlete who best combines the qualities of leadership and sportsmanship.

In 2006 he combined with former Canada National Team rower Robert Weitemeyer as well as varsity athletes Stephane Gervais, Robert Miller and Kevin Johns to capture the overall Men's Championship for Storm the Wall, a relay race held annually at the University of British Columbia, widely considered as the largest intramural event in North America.

== Education ==
Ben attended Mount Baker Secondary School located in Cranbrook, B.C.

Rutledge graduated from the Sauder School of Business in University of British Columbia with a Bachelor of Commerce, specializing in Real Estate and Marketing in 2006.
