= Meindert Klem =

Dutch rower

Personal information
- Full name: Meindert Gerrit Klem
- Born: 16 October 1987 (age 38) Ouderkerk aan de Amstel, Netherlands
- Height: 196 cm (6 ft 5 in)
- Weight: 92 kg (203 lb)
Medal record
Men's rowing
Representing Netherlands
World Championships
Bronze medal – third place	2009 Poznań	Eight

Meindert Gerrit Klem (born 16 October 1987 in Ouderkerk aan de Amstel) is a rower from the Netherlands.

Klem qualified for the 2008 Summer Olympics in Beijing with the Dutch eights forming a team with Olaf van Andel, Jozef Klaassen, Rogier Blink, David Kuiper, Diederik Simon, Olivier Siegelaar, Mitchel Steenman and cox Peter Wiersum. At the 2012 Summer Olympics, he competed in the men's pair with Nanne Sluis.

Klem began rowing in October 2002 at Willem III Rowing Club in Amsterdam, Netherlands. As a junior, he won the Dutch Indoor Rowing Championship in 2002, and the Ergohead in 2003. He was selected for the Junior National Team for the Coupe de la Jeunesse in the double, and won two gold medals with double partner Jacques Huppes.
