= Zhou Yinan =

Chinese rower

Personal information
- Nationality: Chinese
- Born: 6 December 1983 (age 41); Baotou, China

Sport
- Sport: Rowing

Zhou Yinan (Chinese: 周意男; born 6 December 1983) is a Chinese rower. He competed in the men's eight event at the 2008 Summer Olympics.
