= Matthias Flach (rower) =

German rower

Medal record

Men's rowing

Representing Germany

World Rowing Championships
Gold medal – first place	2006 Eton	M4+
Bronze medal – third place	2003 Milan	M4+
Bronze medal – third place	2005 Gifu	M4+
Bronze medal – third place	2007 Munich	M4+

Matthias Flach (born 30 September 1982, in Rostock) is a German rower.
