= Beau Hoopman =

American rower (born 1980)

Personal information
- Born: October 1, 1980 (age 45) Plymouth, Wisconsin, United States
- Education: Wisconsin Badgers
- Height: 6 ft 4 in (1.93 m)
- Weight: 200 lb (91 kg)

Sport
- Position: rower
- Team: USA Rowing
Medal record
Men's rowing
Representing the United States
Olympic Games
Gold medal – first place	2004 Athens	Men's eight
Bronze medal – third place	2008 Beijing	Men's eight
Pan American Games
Gold medal – first place	2003 Santo Domingo	Men's eight

Beau Hoopman (born October 1, 1980) is an American rower.

== Collegiate career ==
A member of his high school's golf team, Hoopman joined the rowing team at the University of Wisconsin as a walk-on in the fall of 1999. He won the Eastern Sprints both as a member of Wisconsin's freshman eight in 2000, and in the varsity eight in 2002, the latter of which brought Wisconsin its first victory in the event since the inaugural Eastern Sprints in 1946. He was named to the University of Wisconsin-Madison Athletic Hall of Fame in 2014.

== International career ==
Hoopman first competed internationally for the United States in 2001, winning a silver medal at the World Under 23 Rowing Championships in Ottensheim, Austria. He was also a member of the gold medal eight at the 2002 Under 23 championships in Genoa, Italy, and placed 12th in the Men's 4- at the 2002 world championships, his first appearance as a member of the senior national team.

In 2004, Hoopman was part of the Olympic gold medal-winning Men's 8+ team at the Athens Olympic Games, which also set the M8+ 2000m World Record during a qualifying heat. He was also a member of the bronze medal-winning Men's 8+ team in the 2008 Olympics in Beijing.

== Coaching career ==
Hoopman rejoined his alma mater the University of Wisconsin as a volunteer coach for the 2010–11 school year, before becoming an assistant coach at beginning of the 2011–12 season. After serving as the men's assistant rowing coach for 12 years, Hoopman took over the Men's Wisconsin Badgers Crew program in the summer of 2023 as just the program's fourth head coach since 1946.

== Personal life ==
- Hometown: Plymouth, Wisconsin
- Current Residence: Madison, WI
- High School: Plymouth High School
- Undergraduate Education: University of Wisconsin, Biological Aspects of Conservation, 2003
- Began Rowing: 2000 - University of Wisconsin
- Club Affiliation: USRowing Training Center
- Training Location: Princeton, New Jersey
- Current Coaches: Mike Teti
- Years on National Team: Seven - 2001–02, Under 23; 2003, Pan American Games; 2002–07, Senior
- Event (s): Sweep
