= Zhang Dechang =

Chinese rower

Personal information
- Nationality: Chinese
- Born: 23 August 1978 (age 47) Shandong, China

Sport
- Sport: Rowing
Medal record
Rowing
Representing China
Olympic Games
Bronze medal – third place	2020 Tokyo	Women's eight

Zhang Dechang (born 23 August 1978) is a Chinese rowing coxswain. He competed in the men's eight event at the 2008 Summer Olympics.
