= Dominic Seiterle =

Canadian rower (born 1975)

Personal information
- Full name: Dominic A. Seiterle
- Born: September 4, 1975 (age 51) Montreal, Quebec, Canada
- Height: 1.93 m (6 ft 4 in)
- Weight: 210 lb (95 kg)

Sport
- Country: Canada
- Sport: Rowing
- Club: Delta Deas Rowing Club
Medal record
Men's rowing
Representing Canada
Olympic Games
Gold medal – first place	2008 Beijing	Men's eight
World Rowing Championships
Gold medal – first place	2007 Munich	Men's eight
World Rowing Cup
Gold medal – first place	2007 Linz	Men's eight
Gold medal – first place	2007 Lucerne	Men's eight
Gold medal – first place	2008 Lucerne	Men's eight
Henley Royal Regatta Grand Challenge Cup
Gold medal – first place	2007	Men's eight

Dominic A. Seiterle (born September 4, 1975) is a Canadian rower born in Montreal, Quebec. He is a gold medallist at the 2008 Summer Olympics and World Rowing Championships as a member of the 8+. He also won three gold medals at the 2007 World Rowing Cup regattas and gold at the 2007 Henley Royal Regatta. Prior to this, he was the 2006 Canadian National Rowing Gold medallist in the single scull and finished 13th at the 2000 Summer Olympics in the double sculls.

He won a gold medal at the 2008 Summer Olympics in the men's eights with Andrew Byrnes, Kyle Hamilton, Malcolm Howard, Adam Kreek, Kevin Light, Ben Rutledge, Jake Wetzel and cox Brian Price.

Dominic graduated from Dartmouth College in 1998 with a BA in Psychology and Environmental Studies. In the summer of 1997, he was diagnosed with thyroid cancer, but he recovered to return to school and captained the heavyweight crew in his senior year. Dominic learned to row at St. Andrew's School in Middletown, Delaware.

In 2005, Dominic completed his MBA in Competitive Business Strategy and Marketing at the William E. Simon Graduate School of Business Administration at the University of Rochester (Rochester, NY). While in New York and after his first year of graduate school, Dominic rowed across Lake Ontario to raise money for cancer research and children diagnosed with cancer. The trip was 130 kilometers from Rochester, New York, to Kingston, Ontario and raised money for the J.P. Wilmot Cancer Center (at the University of Rochester Medical Center) and Camp Trillium (Ontario).
