= Jake Wetzel =

Canadian rower (born 1976)

Medal record

Men's rowing

Representing Canada

Summer Olympics
Gold medal – first place	2008 Beijing	Men's eight
Silver medal – second place	2004 Athens	Coxless four

World Championships

Representing the United States
Gold medal – first place	1999 St. Catharines	Coxed four

Representing Canada
Gold medal – first place	2003 Milan	Coxless four
Gold medal – first place	2007 Munich	Eight

Henley Royal Regatta
Gold medal – first place	2003 Stewards' Challenge Cup	Men's four
Gold medal – first place	2007 Grand Challenge Cup	Men's eight

Jacob Wetzel (born December 26, 1976) is a Canadian rower. He has represented both Canada and the United States at the World Championships and the Olympics. He was born in Saskatoon, Saskatchewan, Canada.

== College years ==
As a teenager, Wetzel was on the Canadian Junior Cycling team; he only began rowing in the fall of 1997 at the University of California, Berkeley. His success was immediate and extraordinary. His collegiate boat was undefeated and won the freshman 8 event at the 1998 Intercollegiate Rowing Association Championship (IRA). That summer Wetzel tried out for and made the Canadian National team in the pair event (2-) and finished seventh at the World Championships in Cologne, Germany.

In 1999, 2001, and 2002 he again competed for Berkeley where he was coached by Steve Gladstone, this time in the varsity 8. All three years his boats won the IRA and were de facto national champions. In 1999 and 2001, his boats were undefeated. In 2002, his boat suffered a single loss to the University of Washington, but beat Washington on several other occasions including the IRA.

== International competitions ==
Internationally, Wetzel competed for the United States team in 1999 (Coxed Four (4+) gold medal at the World Championships in St. Catharines) and in 2000 (7th place with the Quad (4x) at the 2000 Summer Olympics in Sydney). In 1999, Wetzel was one of the principal subjects in the Outside Magazine article "Blood in the Water" on the difficulties and internal competition involved in trying to make a national team boat.

After a two-year pause because of a shoulder injury caused by a mountaineering accident, in 2003 Wetzel returned to the international rowing scene and he joined Team Canada. Wetzel made the coxless four (4-) and he won a gold medal at the 2003 world championships in Milan, Italy. At the 2004 Summer Olympics, Wetzel's boat finished second by inches to Great Britain.

In 2005/2006 Wetzel completed an MSc in Financial Economics at the University of Oxford (Linacre College/Saïd Business School). He was a member of the victorious Oxford crew in the 2006 Oxford-Cambridge Boat Race.

He also won at the 2007 World Championships in Canada's M8+.

He won the gold medal at the 2008 Summer Olympics in the men's eights with Andrew Byrnes, Kyle Hamilton, Malcolm Howard, Adam Kreek, Kevin Light, Ben Rutledge, Dominic Sieterle and cox Brian Price.

Wetzel announced his retirement from international rowing at the Beijing Olympics; Wetzel enrolled in the PhD programme in Finance at the University of British Columbia in autumn 2008.

Wetzel was selected as the most highly decorated rower from the Pac-12 conference when he was selected as its Rower of the Century in 2016. In 2017, he became the first University of California, Berkeley rower alum to be inducted into the Cal Sports Hall of Fame as an individual.
