= Daniel Walsh (rower) =

American rower

Personal information
- Born: May 31, 1979 (age 47) Norwalk, Connecticut, U.S.
Medal record
Men's rowing
Representing United States
Olympic Games
Bronze medal – third place	2008 Beijing	Eights

Daniel Walsh (born May 31, 1979, in Norwalk, Connecticut) is an American rower. He won a bronze medal in the men's eight at the 2008 Summer Olympics.

Walsh attended Brien McMahon High School in Norwalk. Prior to 2008 he had served as an alternate for the men's eight in the 2004 Summer Olympics but did not have a chance to row during those games.
