= Ohio State University Crew Club =

The Ohio State University Crew is the rowing club of Ohio State University, located in Columbus, Ohio, in the United States. It was founded in 1978. Open to both men and women, it is an official university club sport.

== General ==
The team's boathouse, provided by the university, was located on the Olentangy River in the basement of the Drake Performance & Event Center, before its demolition in 2023. Currently, team members practice on the Scioto Mile in downtown Columbus, or the O'Shaugnessy Reservoir, north of Columbus.

== Competition ==
The club competes against crews from around the country, including both club teams and varsity programs. The club is a founding member of the American Collegiate Rowing Association, and competes in the ACRA national championship regatta on a yearly basis.

=== All Competitions ===
Ohio State Crew Club Schedule

Event	Season	Location
Head of the Ohio	Fall	Pittsburgh, OH
Speakmon Regatta	Fall	Columbus, OH (Griggs Reservoir)
Head of the Hooch	Fall	Chattanooga, Tennessee
Wolverbuck Oar (Men Only)	Fall	Alternating; Home or Away (Ann Arbor, MI)
Midwest Championship Erg Sprints	Winter	RPAC - The Ohio State University; Columbus, Ohio
States Cup	Spring	Alternating; Home or Away (East Lansing, MI)
MACRA Championships	Spring	Varies year-to-year
ACRA National Championship Regatta	Spring	Melton Lake Park, Oak Ridge, TN

== Leadership ==
The team is led by an experienced group of coaches in conjunction with a student leadership team. Captains are elected to contribute to the day-to-day operation of the team. On the administrative side of the team, a corps of officers are elected on a yearly basis to lead the team. These officers also nominate directors, to whom they can delegate various responsibilities contributing to the smooth running of the club.

=== Coaches ===
Team	Coach
Head Coach and Director of Rowing	James Malebranche
Varsity Men's Coach	Ben Coffey
Varsity Women's Coach	Tim Binnig
Volunteer Novice Coach	Meagan Van Brocklin
