= Steve Gladstone =

American college athletics administrator

Current position
- Title: Head coach
- Team: USNA

Playing career
- c. 1962: Syracuse

Coaching career (HC unless noted)
- 1966–1969: Princeton (freshmen)
- 1970–1972: Harvard (lightweight)
- 1973–1980: California
- 1982–1994: Brown
- 1997–2008: California
- 2008–2010: California Rowing Club (CRC)
- 2010–2023: Yale
- 2023–2024: Yale (assistant)
- 2024–2025: USNA

Administrative career (AD unless noted)
- 1990: Brown (interim AD)
- 2001–2004: California

Stephen C. Gladstone is an American rowing coach and former college athletics administrator. He was the head coach for the men's heavyweight crew team at Yale University from 2010-2023 and was the team's assistant coach from in 2024. Previously, Gladstone coached at the University of California, Berkeley, where he also served as athletic director.

== Biography ==
=== Early life ===
Gladstone graduated from Kent School in 1960 where he began his rowing career. He then attended Syracuse University where he continued to row and graduated with a bachelor's degree in American literature. He is the son of Henry Gladstone, a renowned radio announcer in the 1950s and 1960s in New York City. He is married to Daria Gladstone, and has three children, Ethan Gladstone, Wendell Gladstone, and Sonya Gladstone.

=== Career at Princeton and Harvard ===
Gladstone began coaching in 1966, directing the Princeton University freshmen to a pair of silver medals at the Intercollegiate Rowing Association regatta, also known as the IRA. Gladstone then took over as varsity lightweight coach at Harvard in 1970. His Harvard crews were undefeated for four straight seasons. They won four straight Eastern Sprints championships and, in 1971, the Thames Challenge Cup and Wyfold Challenge Cup at the Henley Royal Regatta in England.

=== Career at Cal ===
In 1973, he was appointed as head coach of the Cal varsity crew team. He also coached the 1973 U.S. National team. During his tenure at Cal from 1973 to 1980, Gladstone's Bears had three undefeated dual-race seasons, an IRA title in 1976, yet only one Pac-10 championship in 1979.

Gladstone retired after the 1980 season and coached the Cal Alumni for one race in 1981—winning the San Diego Crew Classic. He then decided to coach rowing again and was approached by Brown University.

=== Career at Brown ===
Gladstone coached Brown from 1982 to 1994. At Brown, Gladstone crews amassed four Eastern Sprints championships, five IRA championships and two National Collegiate Rowing Championship titles. In both 1993 and '94, the Brown varsity crew completed the "triple crown" with victories in each of these regattas – a feat that had never before been accomplished. In Gladstone's final season at Brown, the men's crew went undefeated as a program at all levels of competition. Many of Gladstone's athletes at Brown became members of the national teams for the US and for other countries. Following the 1994 season, Gladstone retired from coaching rowing for the second time.

=== Return to Cal ===
Upon retiring, Gladstone helped found Resolute Racing Shells, where he was president and director of marketing. However, Gladstone returned to coaching crew at Cal beginning with the 1997 season.

In his first two years back, his varsity squads finished third at the IRA. In 1999, Gladstone's varsity boat ended Cal's 23-year IRA championship drought. Cal then went on to capture four straight IRA varsity titles from 1999 through 2002 and was undefeated for three straight years. His assistant coach in charge of the freshman squad at this time was rowing coach Craig Amerkhanian (who later went on to a career at Stanford University). The majority of Gladstone and Amerkhanian's oarsmen from those years were members of the national team for either the USA or some other country.

After his return to Cal, Gladstone's varsity boat won seven Pac-10 championships. In addition, they won seven straight San Diego Crew Classics, 1999–2005, and four straight Windemere Collegiate Crew Classics, 2003–2006.

In 2001, Gladstone was named Director of the Intercollegiate Athletic Department at Cal from which he resigned from in 2004 to focus solely on his job as the head coach of Cal men's crew. Gladstone's tenure as athletic director included the hiring football head coach Jeff Tedford.

After the 2008 rowing season, Gladstone retired from collegiate coaching and accepted a job with the California Rowing Club, which is housed on the same property as Cal but in adjacent boathouses.

=== Career at Yale ===
In 2010, Gladstone left the CRC to assume the head coaching position for the Yale University heavyweight men. Since then he has brought the program at Yale back in the national spotlight. His efforts began to bear fruit during the 2014–2015 season, with a first-place finish at Eastern Sprints (the first for Yale since 1982), a win over Harvard in their annual head-to-head race (the first since 2007), and a win over five-time national champion University of Washington at Henley Royal Regatta in the final of the Ladies' Challenge Plate. Yale followed up these results with a first-place finish at the 2015 Head of the Charles Regatta in the regatta's marquee event, the Men's Championship Eights. In 2017, Yale went on to capture its first IRA varsity title by defeating the University of Washington at Lake Natoma by 0.069 seconds. In 2018, Yale captured its second IRA varsity title by defeating the University of Washington at Lake Mercer by 2.689 seconds. In 2019, Yale captured its third IRA varsity title by defeating the University of Washington at Lake Natoma by 3.14 seconds. After missing the 2020 and 2021 seasons due to the COVID-19 pandemic, the Yale heavyweight men returned in 2022 with gold medals at Eastern Sprints in the 1st, 2nd and 3rd Varsity Heavyweight Eight Grand Finals. At the 2022 Intercollegiate Rowing Association national championships, Yale's 1st Varsity Heavyweight men finished 2nd behind University of California, Berkeley, while the 2nd and 3rd Varsity Heavyweight men captured the gold medal in their respective Grand Finals. In 2023, in his last season as a coach, his Varsity Heavyweight Men and Third Varsity Heavyweight eights won their respective Grand Finals at the Eastern Sprints, while the Second Varsity finished fifth in their Grand Final. At the IRA National Championships, the Varsity, Second Varsity, and Third Varsity Eights finished in 4th, 3rd, and 5th in their respective Grand Finals, earning the team a 3rd place finish in the overall Points Trophy.

=== Navy ===
In 2024 Gladstone again came out of retirement to take the head coaching position at the US Naval Academy.

Gladstone has served on the board of directors of the National Association of Amateur Oarsmen and has also been a member of the Men's Olympic Rowing Committee.

== Awards and accomplishments ==
Including his tenure at Cal, Brown and Yale, Gladstone's boats have won 14 IRA titles in the varsity event, tied with Charles E. Courtney of Cornell who coached from 1883 to 1920. His six IRA victories at Cal also ties him with the legendary Carroll M. "Ky" Ebright for most victories by a Cal coach. During his career at Harvard, Cal, Brown and Yale, Gladstone's first boat has officially won the conference championship a remarkable 18 times.

Lightweight Varsity Boat

- Eastern Sprints Champions 1969, 1970, 1971 and 1972

Heavyweight Varsity Boat

- Eastern Sprints Champions 1982, 1984, 1987, 1993, 1994, 2015, 2016, 2017, 2018, 2019, 2022, 2023
- Pac-10 Champions 1979, 1998, 1999, 2000, 2001, 2002, 2005 and 2006
- IRA Champions 1976, 1983, 1986, 1987, 1993, 1994, 1999, 2000, 2001, 2002, 2006, 2017, 2018, 2019
- National Collegiate Rowing Championships 1993, 1994
- San Diego Crew Classic 1999, 2000, 2001, 2002, 2003, 2004, 2005, 2016, 2019
- Head of the Charles Regatta, Men's Championship Eights, first place (2015)
- IRA Ten Eyck Trophy 1994, 2022
