= Alastair Heathcote =

British rower (born 1977)

Medal record

Men's rowing

Representing Great Britain

Olympic Games
Silver medal – second place	2008 Beijing	Eight

World Championships
Bronze medal – third place	2007 Munich	Eight

World Cup
Silver medal – second place	2008 Lucerne	Eight
Bronze medal – third place	2007 Amsterdam	Eight
Bronze medal – third place	2008 Poznan	Eight

Sir Alastair Robert Heathcote, 11th Baronet (born 18 August 1977 in Athens, Greece) is a British rower and Captain in the British Army.

== Biography ==
Heathcote is the eldest son and an heir of Sir Mark Simon Robert Heathcote, 10th Baronet, OBE. He was educated at Eton College, Newcastle University and Oxford Brookes University. His hobbies are free-form contemporary dance, pheasant stroking and coarse fishing. His father was an Old Etonian Gunner officer. His father later served as a diplomat at the British High Commission in Pakistan and later the head of security for an oil company. He was in Mustians house at Eton. He served as Captain of Boats at the school. His younger brother Nicholas is also a distinguished oarsman. He joined the army in 2001 and served in Bosnia (Operation Joint Endeavor in support of UNPROFOR) and Iraq (Operation Telic). He was selected for the Great Britain squad in 2006 and won a bronze medal in the eight at the Rowing World Cup in 2007 at Amsterdam and at the following 2007 Rowing World Championships in Munich. He was in the GB team (Men's 8) in the Beijing Olympics, where he won the silver medal. He coached at Latymer Upper School in West London until 2011.

Baronetage of Great Britain
Preceded by Mark Simon Heathcote	Baronet (of London); 2025–	Succeeded by Incumbent
