= Wang Xiangdang =

Chinese rower

Personal information
- Nationality: Chinese
- Born: 5 April 1983 (age 42); Shandong, China

Sport
- Sport: Rowing

Wang Xiangdang (born 5 April 1983) is a Chinese rower. He competed in the men's eight event at the 2008 Summer Olympics.
