= Kyle Hamilton (rower) =

Canadian rower (born 1978)

Personal information
- Born: February 26, 1978 (age 48) Victoria, British Columbia, Canada
Medal record
Men's rowing
Representing Canada
Olympic Games
Gold medal – first place	2008 Beijing	Eight
World Rowing Championships
Gold medal – first place	2002 Seville	Eight
Gold medal – first place	2003 Milan	Eight
Gold medal – first place	2007 Munich	Eight
World Rowing Cup
Gold medal – first place	2003 Lucerne	Eight
Gold medal – first place	2007 Linz	Eight
Gold medal – first place	2007 Lucerne	Eight
Gold medal – first place	2008 Lucerne	Eight
Silver medal – second place	2005 Eton	Men's pair
Bronze medal – third place	2002 Lucerne	Eight
Bronze medal – third place	2004 Lucerne	Pair
Bronze medal – third place	2004 Munich	Pair
Henley Royal Regatta Grand Challenge Cup
Gold medal – first place	2002	Eight
Gold medal – first place	2003	Eight
Gold medal – first place	2007	Eight
Canadian University Rowing Championships
Gold medal – first place	2005 CURC	Eight
Gold medal – first place	2005 CURC	Pair

Kyle Hamilton (born February 26, 1978) is a Canadian rower from Richmond, British Columbia. He won the gold medal at the 2002, 2003 and 2007 world championships for Canada's men's eight team in Milan, Italy and Seville, Spain and Munich.

He won a gold medal at the 2008 Summer Olympics in the men's eights with Andrew Byrnes, Malcolm Howard, Adam Kreek, Kevin Light, Ben Rutledge, Dominic Seiterle, Jake Wetzel and cox Brian Price.

Hamilton now works as a litigation and employment lawyer with Pearlman Lindholm in Victoria, British Columbia.
