= Sam Conrad =

Australian rower

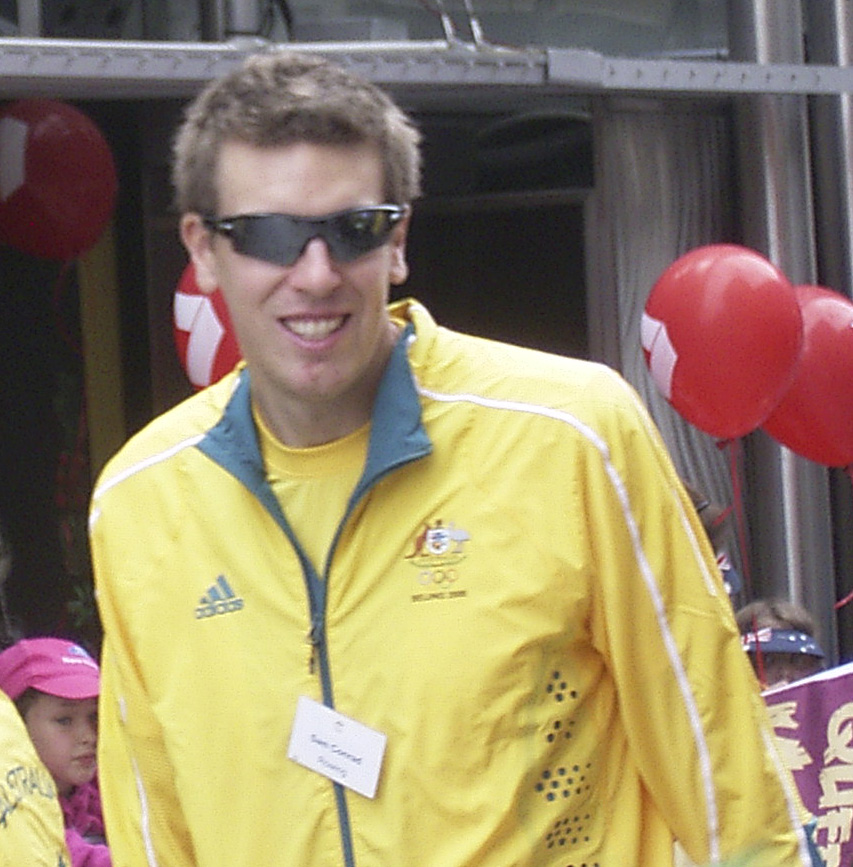

Personal information
- Born: 21 October 1983 (age 42)
- Education: Brisbane Grammar School; University of Queensland
- Years active: 1998-2008

Sport
- Sport: Rowing
- Club: Queensland Uni Boat Club

Achievements and titles
- National finals: King's Cup 2003-2008
Medal record
Men's rowing
Representing Australia
World Championships
Gold medal – first place	2005 Gifu	M2+
World Rowing U23 Championships
Bronze medal – third place	2003 U23 Belgrade	M8+

Sam Conrad (born 27 October 1980 in New South Wales) is an Australian former representative rower. He was a national champion, a world champion and an Olympian like his father and grandfather.

== Rowing pedigree ==
Conrad's grandfather Maurice Grace from the North Shore Rowing Club in Sydney raced the Australian coxless pair at the 1956 Melbourne Olympics and placed fourth. Sam's father Tim Conrad was a New South Wales King's Cup winner from the UNSW Rowing Club and later the Sydney Rowing Club who rowed in the six seat of the Australian men's eight at the 1976 Olympics in Montreal who finished fifth.

== Club and state rowing ==
Conrad was educated at Brisbane Grammar School where he took up rowing. His senior rowing was from the University of Queensland Boat Club.

He was first selected to represent Queensland in the men's youth eight which contested the Noel F Wilkinson Trophy in the Interstate Regatta within the 2001 Australian Rowing Championships. He raced again in the victorious Queensland youth eight of 2002. On six successive occasions between 2003 and 2008 he rowed in the Queensland senior men's eight contesting the King's Cup at the Australian Interstate Regatta. He stroked those eights in 2006, 2007 and 2008.

In Queensland University colours and racing with his world championship partner Hardy Cubasch, Conrad contested national titles at the Australian Rowing Championships. In 2005 they won the Australian men's pair and men's coxless four national titles. They contested those same national titles in 2006 and in a composite selection trial crew with Drew Ginn and David Crawshay from Mercantile they won the Australian men's coxless four championship and were presented with the Bob Aitken Memorial Trophy in its inaugural for that event. In 2007 and 2008 he contested the men's coxless four again in composite selection crews and in 2007 with Ginn, Duncan Free and James Tomkins he won the title a second time.

== International representative rowing ==
Conrad was first selected to represent Australia in an all-Queensland men's junior coxed four at the 2001 Junior World Rowing Championships in Duisburg, Germany. That four, coached by his father Tim, placed seventh.

In 2002 he was selected in the Australian men's eight who contested the World Rowing U23 Championships in Genoa and achieved a fourth placing. The following year at the 2003 World Rowing U23 Championships in Belgrade he was in the six seat of the men's eight who won a bronze U23 World Championship medal.

For the 2004 World Rowing Championships Conrad made his first appearance in a senior Australian representative crew when he stroked a coxless four to the A final, but a sixth-place finish. In 2005 he was picked to stroke a coxed pair at the 2005 World Rowing Championships in Gifu, Japan with Hardy Cubasch at bow and Marc Douez up front. The pair led the race from start to finish and claimed Australia's second ever World Championship title in that boat class.

From 2006 to 2008 Conrad held a seat in the Australian men's senior eight. He contested two World Rowing Cups in Europe in 2006 and was seated at four when the eight raced at the 2006 World Rowing Championships at Eton Dorney to a fourth placing. He competed in the eight at World Rowing Cups II and III in 2007 and was in the five seat when they contested the 2007 World Rowing Championships in Munich and placed eighth. His final Australian representative appearances were in the 2008 Olympic year. He competed in the lead-up World Rowing Cups and then was seated at seven in the men's eight who raced to sixth place in the final at the 2008 Summer Olympics.
