= Sebastian Schmidt (rower) =

German rower (born 1985)

Medal record

Men's rowing

Representing Germany

World Rowing Championships
Silver medal – second place	2007 Poznań	Coxless four
Gold medal – first place	2009 Poznań	Eight
Gold medal – first place	2010 Karapiro	Eight

Sebastian Schmidt (born 6 January 1985 in Wiesbaden, West Germany) is a German rower who competed in the 2008 Summer Olympics in the men's eight and 2012 Summer Olympics in the men's four. He is also a two-times World Champion in the men's eight.
