= Qu Xiaoming =

Chinese rower

Personal information
- Nationality: Chinese
- Born: 8 December 1986 (age 38); Dalian, China

Sport
- Sport: Rowing

Qu Xiaoming (born 8 December 1986) is a Chinese rower. He competed in the men's eight event at the 2008 Summer Olympics.
