= Marcus McElhenney =

American rower (born 1981)

Personal information
- Born: July 27, 1981 (age 44) Drexel Hill, Pennsylvania, U.S.
Medal record
Men's rowing
Representing the United States
Olympic Games
Bronze medal – third place	2008 Beijing	Men's Eight
World Championships
Gold medal – first place	2003 Milano	Men's four
Gold medal – first place	2005 Kaizu	Men's Eight
Gold medal – first place	2009 Poznan	Men's pair
Silver medal – second place	2005 Kaizu	Men's four
Bronze medal – third place	2004 Banyoles	Men's four
Bronze medal – third place	2006 Eton	Men's Eight
Eon Hanse Canal Cup
Silver medal – second place	2003 Rendsburg	Men's Eight
Bronze medal – third place	2004 Rendsburg	Men's Eight
Gold medal – first place	2005 Rendsburg	Men's Eight
Gold medal – first place	2006 Rendsburg	Men's Eight
Head of the Charles Regatta
Gold medal – first place	2003 Boston	Men's Eight
U.S. Rowing Club & Elite National Championships
Gold medal – first place	2007 Cooper River	Men's Eight
Gold medal – first place	2007 Cooper River	Men's Four
Gold medal – first place	2009 Oak Ridge	Men's Eight

Marcus McElhenney (born July 27, 1981) is an American coxswain and attorney. He won a bronze medal in the men's eight at the 2008 Summer Olympics, before a career in law and politics.

== Life and career ==
McElhenney first competed internationally in 2001, representing the United States in Linz, Austria at the Nations' Cup (Under 23 World Championships) where he coxed the men's eight to a silver medal. McElhenney was invited to try out for the 2002 Under 23 World Championship team.

His first major international success at the senior/Olympic level came at the 2003 World Rowing Championships in Milan where he won a gold medal in the coxed four event. A year later at the 2004 World Rowing Championships, he won a bronze medal in the same event. At 2005 World Rowing Championships he coxed both the eights and fours, winning a gold and a silver medal respectively, the first US athlete to have earned two medals at the same World Rowing Championships. In 2007 won both the eights and coxed fours at the 2007 USRowing championships.

McElhenney grew up in Delaware County, Pennsylvania, and graduated from Temple University in Philadelphia, Pennsylvania. He is the cousin of actor Rob McElhenney.

He served as principal architect of the coxswain curriculum at Sparks Rowing, a social business that provides the largest amount of coxswain specific programming in the world. McElhenney graduated from the University of San Francisco School of law, and he currently practices law in California.

== Competitive history ==
=== Senior ===
Year	Event	Women's 8+	Men's 8+	Men's 4+	Men's 2+
2003	World Championships			1st place, gold medalist(s)	
2003	Eon Hanse Canal Cup		2nd place, silver medalist(s)		
2003	Head of the Charles Regatta		1st place, gold medalist(s)		
2004	World Championships			3rd place, bronze medalist(s)	
2004	Eon Hanse Canal Cup		3rd place, bronze medalist(s)		
2005	World Championships		1	3rd place, bronze medalist(s)	
2005	Eon Hanse Canal Cup		3rd place, bronze medalist(s)		
2006	World Championships		3rd place, bronze medalist(s)		
2006	Eon Hanse Canal Cup		1st place, gold medalist(s)		
2007	U.S. Rowing Club & Elite National Championships		1st place, gold medalist(s)	1st place, gold medalist(s)	
2008	Olympic Games		3rd place, bronze medalist(s)		
2009	World Championships				1st place, gold medalist(s)
2009	U.S. Rowing Club & Elite National Championships		1st place, gold medalist(s)		
2011	Pan American Games		1st place, gold medalist(s)		
