= Josh Inman =

American rower

Personal information
- Born: March 13, 1980 (age 46)
Medal record
Men's rowing
Representing United States
Olympic Games
Bronze medal – third place	2008 Beijing	Eight
World Rowing Championships
Gold medal – first place	2005 Gifu	Eight
Bronze medal – third place	2004 Banyoles	Coxed four

Josh Inman (born March 13, 1980) is an American rower. Inman was born and raised in Hillsboro, Oregon, where he graduated from Hillsboro High School and became an Eagle Scout. He lettered with the Oregon State Beavers men's rowing team during the years 2000–2003. After graduation, he joined the US National Team with some success and was selected as the USRowing Male athlete of the year in 2005. In the 2008 Summer Olympics, he won a bronze medal in the men's eight. He won the Stewards' Challenge Cup at the 2010 Henley Royal Regatta.
