= Marty Rabjohns =

Australian rowing cox

Personal information
- Born: 9 April 1978 (age 48) Goulburn, New South Wales
- Years active: 1991-2008

Sport
- Country: Australia
- Sport: Rowing
- Club: Sydney University Boat Club

Achievements and titles
- Olympic finals: 2008 Beijing
- World finals: 2006 and 2007
- National finals: King's Cup 2003-2008

Marty Rabjohns (born 9 April 1978 in Goulburn) is an Australian former rowing coxswain. He was a four-time Australian national champion and a 2008 Olympian.

== Club and state rowing ==
Rabjohns was educated at The King's School in Sydney where he took up rowing. He matriculated in 1996. His senior club rowing was from the Sydney University Boat Club.

He first made state selection for New South Wales in the 2003 senior men's eight which contested the King's Cup at the Interstate Regatta within the Australian Rowing Championships He again coxed New South Wales King's Cup eights in 2004, 2005, 2006, 2007 and 2008, steering those crews to King's Cup victory in 2005 and 2008.

In Sydney University Boat Club colours, Rabjohns coxed crews contesting national titles at the Australian Rowing Championships on a number of occasions. In 2005 and 2007 he steered a composite New South Wales fours competing for the coxed four title. In 2006 he coxed a composite Sydney University Boat Club/University of Queensland/University of Technology Sydney crew to victory as the champion Australian coxed four. That crew contained the American Winklevoss twins who at the time were rowing with the UTS Haberfield Rowing Club. In 2008 he again won an Australian championship coxed four title, this time in an all Sydney University crew.

== International representative rowing ==
Rabjohns made his Australian representative debut in 2006 amongst a boatload of new faces in the Australian men's eight. Stefan Szczurowski was the only continuing crew member from the 2004 Olympic eight and Rowing Australia had not boated a representative eight in 2005. Rabjohns was in the coxswain's seat at two 2006 World Rowing Cups in Europe and then at the 2006 World Rowing Championships at Eton Dorney where he steered the crew to fourth place.

He secured his seat as Australia's senior representative coxswain into 2007 and steered the eight at World Rowing Cups in Amsterdam and Lucerne and then at the 2007 World Rowing Championships in Munich. At those championships he coxed an Australian pair of Fergus Pragnell and Jason Heard to fourth place and also the eight which missed the A final and finished in overall eighth place.

Coming into the 2008 Olympic campaign, Rabjohns beat out his Victorian opponent Marc Douez and held his place in the stern of the eight. At the 2008 Beijing Olympics that crew finished last in their heat, fought through a repechage to make the Olympic final and finished in sixth place. It was Rabjohn's final representative appearance.

== Professional career ==
Rabjohns undertook broad tertiary studies - a B.Applied Science from Canberra University, a Grad Diploma in Education from University of Technology Sydney, an MBA from University of Sydney and a Masters of Philosophy from the University of Queensland.

He has worked in performance related roles for the Australian Sports Commission, the New South Wales Institute of Sport, Rowing Australia and the Canberra office of PricewaterhouseCoopers.
