= Jochen Urban =

German rower (born 1983)

Personal information
- Born: 23 September 1983 (age 42) Krefeld, West Germany
Medal record
Men's Rowing
Representing Germany
World Championships
Bronze medal – third place	2005 Gifu	M8+

Jochen Urban (born 23 September 1983, in Krefeld) is a German rower. He competed at the 2004 and the 2008 Summer Olympics. Urban is married to swimmer Anne Poleska.
