= Tom Stallard =

English rower and race engineer

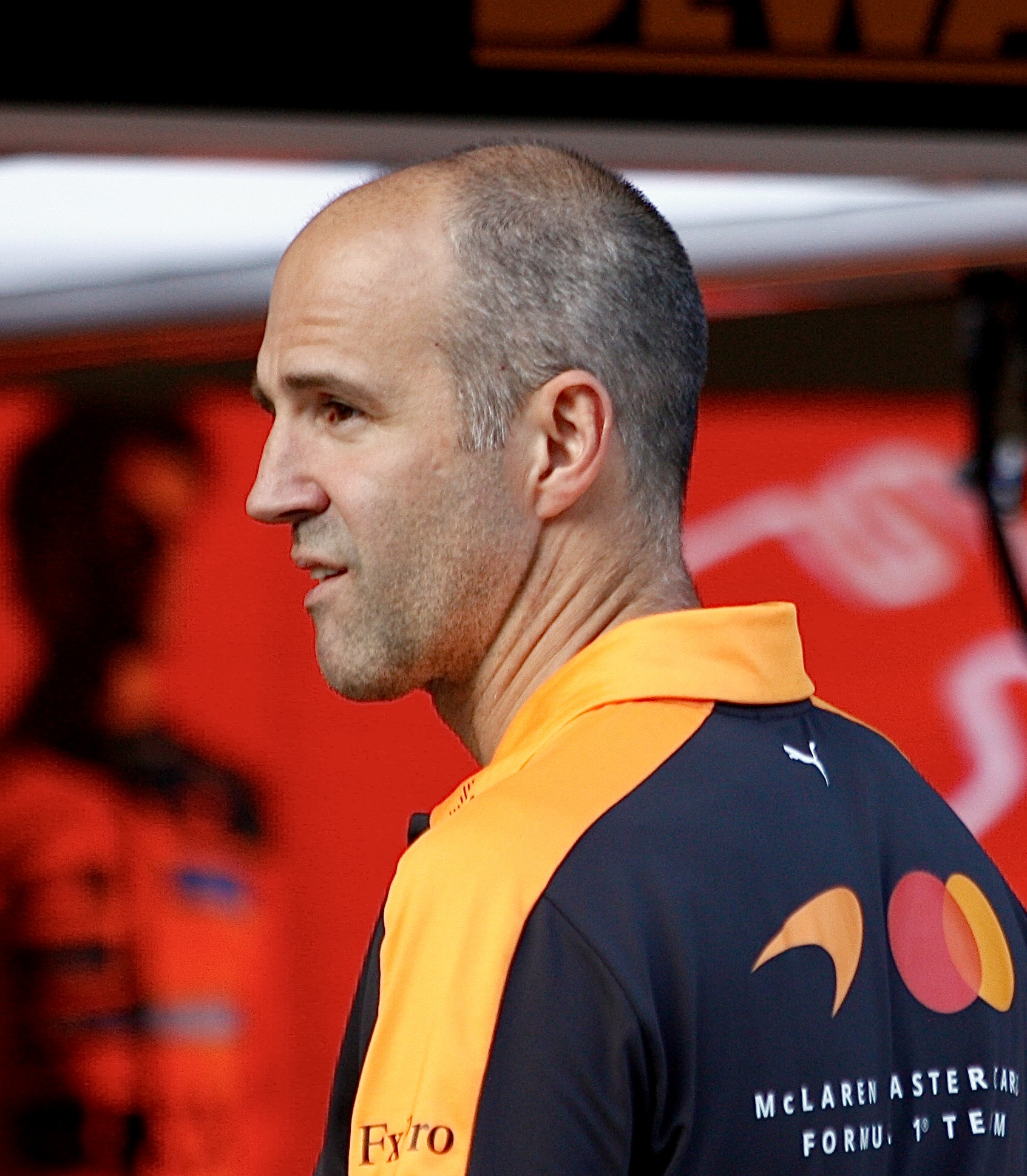
- Stallard during the 2026 Hungarian Grand Prix
- Born: 11 September 1978 (age 48); London, England
- Education: University of Cambridge
- Occupation: Race engineer
- Employer: McLaren Formula One Team
- Sports career
Medal record
Men's rowing
Representing Great Britain
Olympic Games
Silver medal – second place	2008 Beijing	Eight

Thomas Alexander Stallard (born 11 September 1978) is a British former rower and motorsport engineer who currently works for the McLaren F1 Team as the race engineer for Oscar Piastri.

== Early and personal life ==
Thomas Alexander Stallard was born on 11 September 1978 in London, England. His father, Matt, was a rower for the University of London.

== Rowing career ==
Stallard began rowing at the age of 13, eventually participating at the World Rowing U19 Championships in 1996. In university, he attended the University of Cambridge, where he rowed in the Cambridge University Boat Club (CUBC). Stallard competed in the University Boat Races between 1999 and 2002, winning in 1999 and 2001. He was the president of CUBC for the 2002 season.

Stallard's first Olympics was at the 2004 Summer Olympics in Athens. Competing for Team GB, his team finished ninth out of nine boats. Stallard participated at the 2008 Summer Olympics in Beijing, winning a silver medal for Great Britain in the men's eight.

== Formula One ==
After retiring from rowing, Stallard joined the McLaren Formula One team as a simulator test engineer. He later became the performance engineer for Jenson Button, and was eventually promoted to race engineer in 2014. In addition to Button, he has also served as the race engineer for Stoffel Vandoorne, Carlos Sainz Jr., Daniel Ricciardo and Oscar Piastri.
