= David Dennis (rower) =

Australian rower

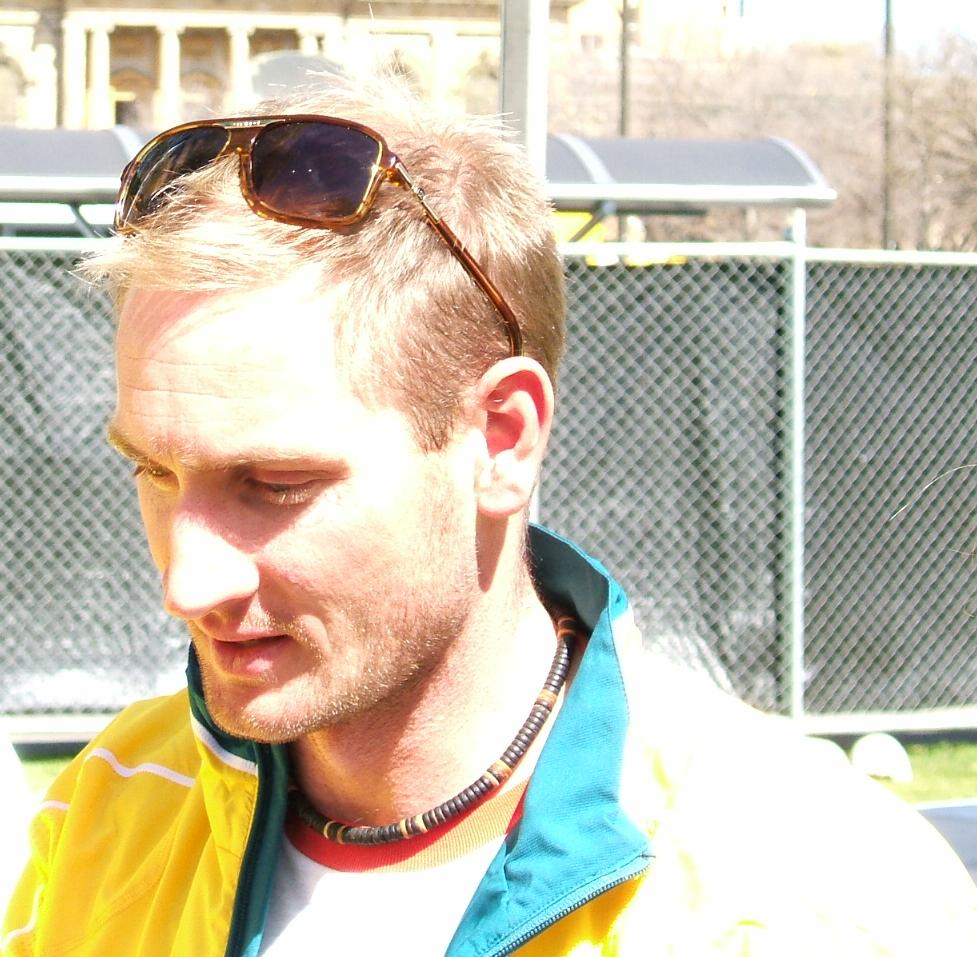
David Dennis

David Dennis (born 1980) is an Australian rower who represented Australia at the 2004 Summer Olympics in the men's coxless four and Australia at the 2008 Summer Olympics in the men's eight.
