= Wyatt Allen =

American rower (born 1979)

Personal information
- Born: January 11, 1979 (age 47) Baltimore, Maryland, U.S.
Medal record
Men's rowing
Representing the United States
Gold medal – first place	2004 Athens	Eight
Bronze medal – third place	2008 Beijing	Eight

Wyatt Allen (born January 11, 1979, in Baltimore, Maryland) is an American rower and head coach of Dartmouth Heavyweight Rowing

== Career ==
Allen is a graduate of Portland High School and the University of Virginia, where he rowed on the men's club team from 1998 to 2001.

In 2004, he won the Diamond Challenge Sculls (the premier event for single sculls) at the Henley Royal Regatta. Later that year he won a gold medal at the 2004 Summer Olympics.

Four years later he won bronze medal at the 2008 Summer Olympics.

He is currently the head coach of men's heavyweight rowing at Dartmouth College.

After leading his varsity 8+ to a silver medal at the Eastern Sprints and a bronze medal at the Intercollegiate Rowing Association national championship in the spring of 2025, Wyatt was awarded the IRCA coach of the year award; marking the best performance for the Dartmouth heavies in over 30 years.
