= Steven Coppola =

American rower (born 1984)

Personal information
- Born: Douglas Steven Coppola Jr. May 22, 1984 (age 42) Buffalo, New York, U.S.
- Education: Canisius High School; Princeton University
- Spouse: Katharine Hagler (m. 2013)
Medal record
Men's rowing
Representing United States
Olympic Games
Bronze medal – third place	2008 Beijing	Eight

Douglas Steven Coppola Jr. (born May 22, 1984, in Buffalo, New York) is an American rower. He won a bronze medal in the men's eight at the 2008 Summer Olympics. He is currently the Head Women's coach at Cornell University in Ithaca, NY.

== Biography ==
Steven Coppola was born on May 22, 1984, in Buffalo, New York, a son of Mimi Barnes-Coppola and Douglas Steven Coppola Sr. He attended Canisius High School, where he started rowing in 1998 at West Side Rowing Club's "Learn-to-Row" camp. He won multiple Scholastic National Rowing Championships. He graduated from Canisius High School in 2002. He then went on to get his undergraduate degree from Princeton University in Psychology, from which he graduated in 2006. He also won numerous National and International titles while rowing for Princeton and in 2005 and 2006. He was a member of the Princeton varsity eight that finished second in the Intercollegiate Rowing Association Championships. He made his Olympic debut at the 2008 Olympic Games, rowing for the United States, where he and his team won a bronze medal in the 2000-meter race with a final time of 5:25.34, which was less than 2 seconds behind first place Canada. Coppola is the first ever athlete from Western New York's West Side Rowing Club to receive an Olympic Medal.

== Race results ==
=== International Results ===
Year	Race	Event	Place/Award	Reference
2011	FISA World Championships	Men's Eight	8th place	
2011	World Rowing Cup 3, Lucerne	Men's Eight	3rd Place	
2009	FISA World Championships	Men's Four	13th place	
2009	World Rowing Cup 3, Lucerne	Men's Four	3rd place	
2008	Olympic Games	Men's Eight	3rd place (Bronze Medal)	
2007	FISA World Championships	Men's Eight	4th place	
2006	FISA World Championships	Men's Eight	3rd place (Bronze Medal)	
2005	FISA World Championships	Men's Eight	1st place (Gold Medal)	
2004	FISA World Championships	Men's Four with Coxswain	3rd place (Bronze Medal)	
2003	Henley Royal Regatta	Temple Challenge Cup	1st place (Temple Challenge Cup)	

=== National Results ===
Year	Race	Event	Place/Award	Reference
2007	U.S. National Rowing Championships	Men's Four with Coxswain	1st place (Gold Medal)	
2007	U.S. National Rowing Championships	Men's Eight	2nd place (Silver Medal)	
2006	Intercollegiate Rowing Association Men's Championships	Men's Varsity Eight	2nd place (Silver Medal)	
2006	Eastern Men's Sprints	Men's Varsity Eight	1st place (Gold Medal)	
2005	Intercollegiate Rowing Association Men's Championships	Men's Varsity Eight	2nd place (Silver Medal)	
2005	Eastern Men's Sprints	Men's Varsity Eight	3rd place (Bronze Medal)	

== See also ==
- List of Princeton University Olympians
