= Adam Kreek =

Canadian author, world champion rower (b. 1980)

Adam Kreek OLY
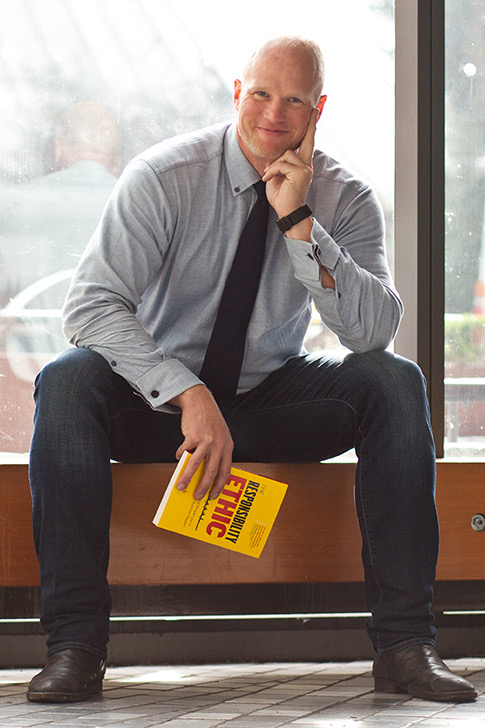
- Kreek in 2019

Personal information
- Born: December 2, 1980 (age 45) London, Ontario, Canada
- Height: 1.93 m (6 ft 4 in)
- Weight: 91 kg (201 lb)
Medal record
Men's rowing
Representing Canada
Olympic Games
| Gold medal – first place | 2008 Beijing | Eight |
World Rowing Championships
| Gold medal – first place | 2002 Seville | Eight |
| Gold medal – first place | 2003 Milan | Eight |
| Gold medal – first place | 2007 Munich | Eight |
World Rowing Cup
| Gold medal – first place | 2003 Lucerne | Eight |
| Gold medal – first place | 2004 Munich | Eight |
| Gold medal – first place | 2004 Lucerne | Eight |
| Gold medal – first place | 2007 Linz | Eight |
| Gold medal – first place | 2007 Lucerne | Eight |
| Gold medal – first place | 2008 Lucerne | Eight |
| Bronze medal – third place | 2002 Lucerne | Eight |
Henley Royal Regatta Grand Challenge Cup
| Gold medal – first place | 2002 | Eight |
| Gold medal – first place | 2003 | Eight |
| Gold medal – first place | 2007 | Eight |

Adam Kreek (born December 2, 1980) is an author, executive business coach and Canadian rower. He is a member of the BC Sports Hall of Fame and the Ontario Sports Hall of Fame.

After his athletic career, Kreek's work has focused upon executive leadership and performance, and in 2019 he published his first book The Responsibility Ethic: 12 Strategies Exceptional People Use to Do the Work and Make Success Happen. As Kreek says, “The grit that’s required for success in athletics is the same grit that’s required for success in business.” After publishing, this book became a bestseller and appeared regularly on British Columbia's business book bestseller list.

Kreek is an advocate for men's health where he works to promote the adoption of healthy behaviour changes in working-aged individuals.

== Early life ==
Born in London, Ontario, he was a student at the University of Victoria where he met his wife Rebecca. After the Athens Olympics, he moved to Stanford University to complete a degree in geotechnical engineering and hydrology and continue his rowing career there under coach Craig Amerkhanian. In 2005 Kreek took the summer off to get married and spend time with his wife. Kreek coached at Stanford Rowing Center in 2006 and 2007 for the Junior Crew.

== Athletic career ==
He won the gold medal at the 2002, 2003 and 2007 world championships for Canada's men's eight team in Seville, Spain, Milan, Italy and Munich, Germany respectively. At the 2004 Summer Olympics, Kreek competed with the Canadian men's eight, who were widely expected to win a medal but ultimately finished in fifth place.

He won a gold medal at the 2008 Summer Olympics in the men's eights with Andrew Byrnes, Kyle Hamilton, Malcolm Howard, Kevin Light, Ben Rutledge, Dominic Seiterle, Jake Wetzel and cox Brian Price. Kreek's singing of O Canada at the medal ceremony was cited as an inspiration by Simon Whitfield, who won a silver medal in the triathlon. Whitfield wrote "Sing like Adam Kreek" on the handlebars of his bicycle and repeated "Sing like Kreek" to himself near the end of the race.

On 23 January 2013, Kreek set off with three other rowers, Markus Pukonen, Jordan Hanssen and Pat Fleming to attempt the first-ever row from mainland Africa to North America, recording it for classroom lessons in schools across the United States and Canada. On 6 April 2013, 73 days into the 6,700-kilometre transatlantic rowing expedition, the boat capsized in the Bermuda Triangle. The crew called for help through a personal locator beacon attached to a lifejacket and were successfully located and rescued. The expedition was sponsored by the Canadian Wildlife Federation and Ocean Adventure, Rowing and Education (OAR Northwest). A computer program developed at the University of Victoria monitored the crew's activities and ensured they followed a strict schedule that maximized their energy and mental sharpness. There was also scientific equipment on board to monitor the ocean conditions and marine life.

== Athletic heritage ==
His grandfather Aleksander Kreek was an Estonian shot putter and the 1938 European champion in the event before he emigrated to Canada in the 1950s.
