= He Yi (rower) =

Chinese rower

Personal information
- Nationality: Chinese
- Born: 17 December 1982 (age 42); Shanghai, China

Sport
- Sport: Rowing

He Yi (born 17 December 1982) is a Chinese rower. He competed in the men's eight event at the 2008 Summer Olympics.
