= Colin Smith (British rower) =

Zimbabwean-born British rower

Colin M. Smith (born 23 September 1983 in Harare, Zimbabwe) is a Zimbabwean-born British rower, Olympic silver medallist and three times an Oxford Blue. He also possesses a degree in law.

== Education ==
Colin Smith was educated at the Prince Edward School, Zimbabwe and St Catherine's College, Oxford (M.'03) where he read geography. He subsequently read for an MBA at the University of Oxford Saïd Business School in 2009 and finished a Graduate Diploma in Law in 2010.

== The Boat Race ==
Whilst at Oxford University, Smith was a member of Oxford University Boat Club and took part in The Boat Race in 2004 and 2006. He returned in 2009, as president and won a second Boat Race. In 2009, Colin along with George Bridgewater, Alex Hearne and Ante Kusurin graduated with an MBA from the Said Business School.

- 2009 OUBC – Won (two seat)
- 2006 OUBC – Won (two seat)
- 2005 Isis – Lost (stroke seat)
- 2004 OUBC – Lost (stroke seat)

== International Rowing Career ==
=== Olympic Games ===
- 2008 Beijing – Silver, Men's Eight (stroke seat)

=== World Championships ===
- 2007 Munich – Bronze, Coxless Pair (stroke seat)
- 2006 Eton – 6th, Coxless Pair (bow seat)
- 2005 Gifu – 12th, Single Scull

=== World Cups ===
- 2008 Lucerne – 8th, Coxless Four (stroke seat)
- 2008 Munich – Silver, Eight (stroke seat)
- 2007 Amsterdam – Gold, Eight (two seat)
- 2007 Linz – Gold, Coxless Pair (bow seat)
- 2006 Lucerne – Silver, Coxless Pair (bow seat)
- 2005 Munich – 11th, Double Scull (stroke seat)
- 2005 Eton – 13th, Single Scull

=== World Under 23 Regatta ===
- 2005 Amsterdam – 4th, Double Scull (bow seat)
- 2004 Poznań – 2nd, Single Scull
