= Diederik Simon =

Dutch rower

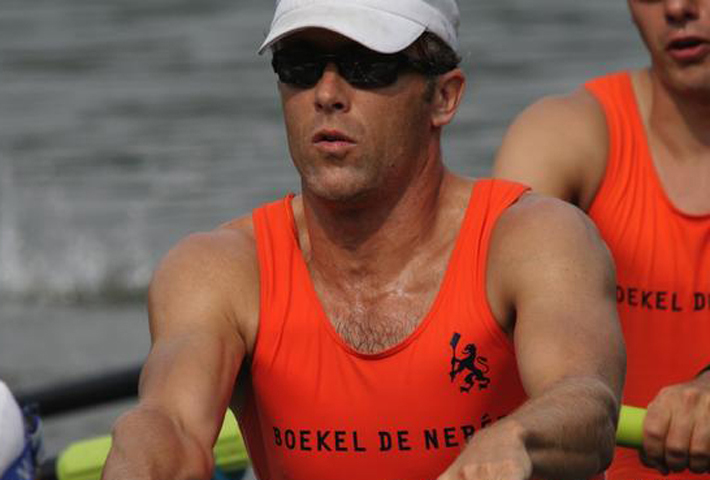
- Simon in 2011

Personal information
- Full name: Diederik Rudolf Simon
- Nationality: Dutch
- Born: 10 April 1970 (age 56) Bloemendaal, North Holland, Netherlands
- Height: 190 cm (6 ft 3 in)
- Weight: 90 kg (198 lb)

Sport
- Sport: Rowing
- Club: Nereus Rowing Club
Medal record
Men's rowing
Representing the Netherlands
Olympic Games
Gold medal – first place	1996 Atlanta	Eight
Silver medal – second place	2000 Sydney	Quadruple sculls
Silver medal – second place	2004 Athens	Eight
World Championships
Silver medal – second place	2001 Luzerne	Quadruple sculls
Bronze medal – third place	2009 Poznań	Eight

Diederik Rudolf Simon (born 10 April 1970 in Bloemendaal, North Holland) is a rower from the Netherlands, who competed for his native country in five consecutive Summer Olympics.

He won the gold medal with the Holland Acht (Holland Eight) at the 1996 Summer Olympics in Atlanta, Georgia, United States. He earned silver medals in the Men's Quadruple Sculls (Sydney 2000) and in the Men's Eights (Athens 2004). After becoming a coach, he rejoined the national team in 2007, placing fourth at the Beijing Olympics (2008) and fifth at the London Olympics (2012), both in the Dutch Men's Eights. He trained for his sixth Olympics in Rio de Janeiro 2016, but was not selected for the Dutch team.

Simon auctioned off his Olympic gold medal to raise money for Nereus Rowing Club in Amsterdam. He left his second silver medal in an Athens taxi but it was returned to him after he reported the loss to the police.

Awards
Preceded by Johan Kenkhuis	Amsterdam Sportsman of the Year; 2004	Succeeded by Guillaume Elmont
