= 2019 World Rowing Championships – Women's lightweight double sculls =

Women's lightweight double sculls at the 2019 World Rowing Championships
- Venue: Linz-Ottensheim
- Location: Ottensheim, Austria
- Dates: 25–31 August
- Competitors: 54 from 27 nations
- Winning time: 7:15.32

Medalists
gold medal	Zoe McBride; Jackie Kiddle	New Zealand
silver medal	Marieke Keijser; Ilse Paulis	Netherlands
bronze medal	Emily Craig; Imogen Grant	Great Britain

The women's lightweight double sculls competition at the 2019 World Rowing Championships took place at the Linz-Ottensheim regatta venue. A top-seven finish ensured qualification for the Tokyo Olympics.

== Schedule ==
The schedule was as follows:

Date	Time	Round
Sunday 25 August 2019	11:31	Heats
Monday 26 August 2019	12:32	Repechages
Wednesday 28 August 2019	12:01	Quarterfinals
Thursday 29 August 2019	11:42	Semifinals A/B
Thursday 29 August 2019	16:40	Semifinals C/D
Thursday 29 August 2019	17:30	Final E
Friday 30 August 2019	09:40	Final D
Saturday 31 August 2019	10:08	Final C
Saturday 31 August 2019	11:36	Final B
Saturday 31 August 2019	14:09	Final A

All times are Central European Summer Time (UTC+2)

== Results ==
=== Heats ===
The four fastest boats in each heat advanced directly to the quarterfinals. The remaining boats were sent to the repechages.

==== Heat 1 ====
Rank	Rowers	Country	Time	Notes
1	Valentina Rodini; Federica Cesarini	Italy	7:07.06	Q
2	Jill Moffatt; Jennifer Casson	Canada	7:07.75	Q
3	Christine Cavallo; Michelle Sechser	United States	7:09.89	Q
4	Sarah Pound; Georgia Nesbitt	Australia	7:12.82	Q
5	Lee Kuan-yi; Hsieh I-ching	Chinese Taipei	7:45.82	R
6	Mariya Chernets; Alina Klimentyeva	Kazakhstan	7:49.52	R

==== Heat 2 ====
Rank	Rowers	Country	Time	Notes
1	Zoe McBride; Jackie Kiddle	New Zealand	7:03.07	Q
2	Emily Craig; Imogen Grant	Great Britain	7:08.27	Q
3	Ayami Oishi; Kanako Ueda	Japan	7:13.14	Q
4	Rocio Lao Sanchez; Natalia de Miguel	Spain	7:24.19	Q
5	Choi Yu-ri; Song Ji-sun	South Korea	7:38.52	R
6	Sara Baraka; Maryam Abdellatif	Egypt	8:01.62	R

==== Heat 3 ====
Rank	Rowers	Country	Time	Notes
1	Marieke Keijser; Ilse Paulis	Netherlands	7:06.72	Q
2	Ionela-Livia Cozmiuc; Gianina Beleagă	Romania	7:10.08	Q
3	Katarzyna Welna; Weronika Deresz	Poland	7:15.47	Q
4	Joanie Delgaco; Melcah Jen Caballero	Philippines	7:38.82	Q
5	Yulisa López; Jennieffer Zúñiga	Guatemala	7:49.72	R

==== Heat 4 ====
Rank	Rowers	Country	Time	Notes
1	Laura Tarantola; Claire Bove	France	7:07.04	Q
2	Kirsten McCann; Ursula Grobler	South Africa	7:08.76	Q
3	Huang Wenyi; Pan Dandan	China	7:13.83	Q
4	Aoife Casey; Denise Walsh	Ireland	7:25.62	Q
5	Phuttharaksa Neegree; Matinee Raruen	Thailand	7:42.74	R

==== Heat 5 ====
Rank	Rowers	Country	Time	Notes
1	Anastasiia Ianina; Alena Furman	Belarus	7:11.34	Q
2	Patricia Merz; Frédérique Rol	Switzerland	7:13.07	Q
3	Katrin Thoma; Sophia Krause	Germany	7:27.68	Q
4	Louisa Altenhuber; Laura Arndorfer	Austria	7:30.41	Q
5	Evita Bole; Olga Svirska	Latvia	7:42.46	R

=== Repechages ===
The two fastest boats in each repechage advanced to the quarterfinals. The remaining boats were sent to the E final.

==== Repechage 1 ====
Rank	Rowers	Country	Time	Notes
1	Evita Bole; Olga Svirska	Latvia	7:33.51	Q
2	Yulisa López; Jennieffer Zúñiga	Guatemala	7:47.34	Q
3	Lee Kuan-yi; Hsieh I-ching	Chinese Taipei	7:53.38	FE
4	Sara Baraka; Maryam Abdellatif	Egypt	8:03.69	FE

==== Repechage 2 ====
Rank	Rowers	Country	Time	Notes
1	Choi Yu-ri; Song Ji-sun	South Korea	7:39.96	Q
2	Phuttharaksa Neegree; Matinee Raruen	Thailand	7:45.75	Q
3	Mariya Chernets; Alina Klimentyeva	Kazakhstan	7:54.93	FE

=== Quarterfinals ===
The three fastest boats in each quarter advanced to the A/B semifinals. The remaining boats were sent to the C/D semifinals.

==== Quarterfinal 1 ====
Rank	Rowers	Country	Time	Notes
1	Emily Craig; Imogen Grant	Great Britain	6:59.09	SA/B
2	Patricia Merz; Frédérique Rol	Switzerland	7:01.30	SA/B
3	Valentina Rodini; Federica Cesarini	Italy	7:03.84	SA/B
4	Aoife Casey; Denise Walsh	Ireland	7:07.17	SC/D
5	Katarzyna Welna; Weronika Deresz	Poland	7:07.33	SC/D
6	Yulisa López; Jennieffer Zúñiga	Guatemala	7:44.48	SC/D

==== Quarterfinal 2 ====
Rank	Rowers	Country	Time	Notes
1	Zoe McBride; Jackie Kiddle	New Zealand	6:52.48	SA/B
2	Kirsten McCann; Ursula Grobler	South Africa	6:56.96	SA/B
3	Jill Moffatt; Jennifer Casson	Canada	6:57.80	SA/B
4	Louisa Altenhuber; Laura Arndorfer	Austria	7:13.41	SC/D
5	Evita Bole; Olga Svirska	Latvia	7:20.55	SC/D
6	Joanie Delgaco; Melcah Jen Caballero	Philippines	7:29.40	SC/D

==== Quarterfinal 3 ====
Rank	Rowers	Country	Time	Notes
1	Marieke Keijser; Ilse Paulis	Netherlands	6:57.64	SA/B
2	Anastasiia Ianina; Alena Furman	Belarus	7:00.77	SA/B
3	Sarah Pound; Georgia Nesbitt	Australia	7:02.33	SA/B
4	Huang Wenyi; Pan Dandan	China	7:05.82	SC/D
5	Kanako Ueda; Ayami Oishi	Japan	7:09.49	SC/D
6	Phuttharaksa Neegree; Matinee Raruen	Thailand	7:28.45	SC/D

==== Quarterfinal 4 ====
Rank	Rowers	Country	Time	Notes
1	Laura Tarantola; Claire Bove	France	7:00.80	SA/B
2	Christine Cavallo; Michelle Sechser	United States	7:03.72	SA/B
3	Ionela-Livia Cozmiuc; Gianina Beleagă	Romania	7:05.05	SA/B
4	Rocio Lao Sanchez; Natalia de Miguel	Spain	7:16.78	SC/D
5	Katrin Thoma; Sophia Krause	Germany	7:17.78	SC/D
6	Choi Yu-ri; Song Ji-sun	South Korea	7:34.13	SC/D

=== Semifinals C/D ===
The three fastest boats in each semi were sent to the C final. The remaining boats were sent to the D final.

==== Semifinal 1 ====
Rank	Rowers	Country	Time	Notes
1	Huang Wenyi; Pan Dandan	China	6:55.87	FC
2	Katrin Thoma; Sophia Krause	Germany	7:01.50	FC
3	Aoife Casey; Denise Walsh	Ireland	7:01.68	FC
4	Evita Bole; Olga Svirska	Latvia	7:13.46	FD
5	Choi Yu-ri; Song Ji-sun	South Korea	7:15.61	FD
6	Yulisa López; Jennieffer Zúñiga	Guatemala	7:31.59	FD

==== Semifinal 2 ====
Rank	Rowers	Country	Time	Notes
1	Katarzyna Welna; Weronika Deresz	Poland	6:59.26	FC
2	Ayami Oishi; Kanako Ueda	Japan	7:03.24	FC
3	Rocio Lao Sanchez; Natalia de Miguel	Spain	7:04.83	FC
4	Louisa Altenhuber; Laura Arndorfer	Austria	7:05.29	FD
5	Phuttharaksa Neegree; Matinee Raruen	Thailand	7:18.07	FD
6	Joanie Delgaco; Melcah Jen Caballero	Philippines	7:22.27	FD

=== Semifinals A/B ===
The three fastest boats in each semi advanced to the A final. The remaining boats were sent to the B final.

==== Semifinal 1 ====
Rank	Rowers	Country	Time	Notes
1	Marieke Keijser; Ilse Paulis	Netherlands	6:50.91	FA
2	Emily Craig; Imogen Grant	Great Britain	6:52.37	FA
3	Ionela-Livia Cozmiuc; Gianina Beleagă	Romania	6:54.01	FA
4	Valentina Rodini; Federica Cesarini	Italy	6:55.69	FB
5	Christine Cavallo; Michelle Sechser	United States	6:57.07	FB
6	Kirsten McCann; Ursula Grobler	South Africa	6:57.97	FB

==== Semifinal 2 ====
Rank	Rowers	Country	Time	Notes
1	Zoe McBride; Jackie Kiddle	New Zealand	6:48.49	FA
2	Anastasiia Ianina; Alena Furman	Belarus	6:51.31	FA
3	Laura Tarantola; Claire Bove	France	6:52.17	FA
4	Patricia Merz; Frédérique Rol	Switzerland	6:53.60	FB
5	Jill Moffatt; Jennifer Casson	Canada	6:56.24	FB
6	Sarah Pound; Georgia Nesbitt	Australia	6:59.92	FB

=== Finals ===
The A final determined the rankings for places 1 to 6. Additional rankings were determined in the other finals.

==== Final E ====
Rank	Rowers	Country	Time
1	Mariya Chernets; Alina Klimentyeva	Kazakhstan	7:24.37
2	Lee Kuan-yi; Hsieh I-ching	Chinese Taipei	7:27.58
3	Sara Baraka; Maryam Abdellatif	Egypt	7:37.83

==== Final D ====
Rank	Rowers	Country	Time
1	Louisa Altenhuber; Laura Arndorfer	Austria	7:19.95
2	Evita Bole; Olga Svirska	Latvia	7:24.13
3	Choi Yu-ri; Song Ji-sun	South Korea	7:27.43
4	Phuttharaksa Neegree; Matinee Raruen	Thailand	7:32.11
5	Joanie Delgaco; Melcah Jen Caballero	Philippines	7:35.53
6	Yulisa López; Jennieffer Zúñiga	Guatemala	7:38.92

==== Final C ====
Rank	Rowers	Country	Time
1	Huang Wenyi; Pan Dandan	China	7:00.82
2	Ayami Oishi; Kanako Ueda	Japan	7:04.34
3	Katarzyna Welna; Weronika Deresz	Poland	7:05.73
4	Katrin Thoma; Sophia Krause	Germany	7:09.84
5	Aoife Casey; Denise Walsh	Ireland	7:10.52
6	Rocio Lao Sanchez; Natalia de Miguel	Spain	7:20.18

==== Final B ====
Rank	Rowers	Country	Time
1	Valentina Rodini; Federica Cesarini	Italy	7:11.18
2	Jill Moffatt; Jennifer Casson	Canada	7:13.65
3	Sarah Pound; Georgia Nesbitt	Australia	7:13.84
4	Christine Cavallo; Michelle Sechser	United States	7:13.96
5	Patricia Merz; Frédérique Rol	Switzerland	7:16.90
6	Kirsten McCann; Ursula Grobler	South Africa	7:17.92

==== Final A ====
Rank	Rowers	Country	Time
1st place, gold medalist(s)	Zoe McBride; Jackie Kiddle	New Zealand	7:15.32
2nd place, silver medalist(s)	Marieke Keijser; Ilse Paulis	Netherlands	7:19.51
3rd place, bronze medalist(s)	Emily Craig; Imogen Grant	Great Britain	7:21.38
4	Ionela-Livia Cozmiuc; Gianina Beleagă	Romania	7:21.73
5	Laura Tarantola; Claire Bove	France	7:23.20
6	Anastasiia Ianina; Alena Furman	Belarus	7:31.53
