= 2023 World Rowing Championships – Women's lightweight double sculls =

Women's lightweight double sculls at the 2023 World Rowing Championships
- Venue: Lake Sava
- Location: Belgrade, Serbia
- Dates: 4 September – 9 September
- Competitors: 40 from 20 nations
- Winning time: 7:19.23

Medalists
gold medal	Emily Craig; Imogen Grant	Great Britain
silver medal	Michelle Sechser; Mary Jones	United States
bronze medal	Mariana-Laura Dumitru; Ionela Cozmiuc	Romania

The women's lightweight double sculls competition at the 2023 World Rowing Championships took place at Lake Sava, in Belgrade.

== Schedule ==
The schedule was as follows:

Date	Time	Round
Monday 4 September 2023	10:02	Heats
Tuesday 5 September 2023	11:54	Repechages
Thursday 7 September 2023	10:15	Semifinals A/B
Thursday 7 September 2023	16:05	Semifinals C/D
Saturday 9 September 2023	09:44	Final D
Saturday 9 September 2023	10:12	Final C
Saturday 9 September 2023	11:30	Final B
Saturday 9 September 2023	14:07	Final A

All times are Central European Summer Time (UTC+2)

== Results ==
=== Heats ===
The two fastest boats in each heat advanced directly to the AB semifinals. The remaining boats were sent to the repechages.

==== Heat 1 ====
Rank	Rower	Country	Time	Notes
1	Mariana-Laura Dumitru; Ionela Cozmiuc	Romania	7:07.16	SA/B
2	Aoife Casey; Margaret Cremen	Ireland	7:07.54	SA/B
3	Patricia Merz; Frédérique Rol	Switzerland	7:18.73	R
4	Natalia Miguel Gómez; Rocio Lao Sanchez	Spain	7:29.97	R
5	Selma Dhaouadi; Khadija Krimi	Tunisia	7:31.89	R

==== Heat 2 ====
Rank	Rower	Country	Time	Notes
1	Emily Craig; Imogen Grant	Great Britain	6:59.28	SA/B
2	Shannon Cox; Jackie Kiddle	New Zealand	7:05.21	SA/B
3	Louisa Altenhuber; Laura Tiefenthaler	Austria	7:17.02	R
4	Alessia Palacios; Valeria Palacios	Peru	7:29.52	R
5	Nourelhoda Arafa; Maryam Abdellatif	Egypt	7:36.46	R

==== Heat 3 ====
Rank	Rower	Country	Time	Notes
1	Michelle Sechser; Mary Jones	United States	7:08.58	SA/B
2	Zou Jiaqi; Qiu Xiuping	China	7:09.31	SA/B
3	Anneka Reardon; Lucy Coleman	Australia	7:20.61	R
4	Marion Reichardt; Johanna Reichardt	Germany	7:22.21	R
5	Mathilde Persson; Marie Morch-Pedersen	Denmark	7:24.60	R

==== Heat 4 ====
Rank	Rower	Country	Time	Notes
1	Jill Moffatt; Jennifer Casson	Canada	7:01.81	SA/B
2	Martyna Radosz; Katarzyna Welna	Poland	7:04.67	SA/B
3	Laura Tarantola; Claire Bové	France	7:05.74	R
4	Dimitra Kontou; Zoi Fitsiou	Greece	7:06.27	R
5	Valentina Rodini; Federica Cesarini	Italy	7:12.32	R

=== Repechages ===
The two fastest boats in each repechage advanced to the AB semifinals. The remaining boats were sent to the CD semifinals.

==== Repechage 1 ====
Rank	Rower	Country	Time	Notes
1	Dimitra Kontou; Zoi Fitsiou	Greece	6:58.89	SA/B
2	Patricia Merz; Frédérique Rol	Switzerland	7:00.83	SA/B
3	Louisa Altenhuber; Laura Tiefenthaler	Austria	7:03.77	SC/D
4	Mathilde Persson; Marie Morch-Pedersen	Denmark	7:08.12	SC/D
5	Marion Reichardt; Johanna Reichardt	Germany	7:11.19	SC/D
6	Selma Dhaouadi; Khadija Krimi	Tunisia	7:17.18	SC/D

==== Repechage 2 ====
Rank	Rower	Country	Time	Notes
1	Laura Tarantola; Claire Bové	France	6:57.78	SA/B
2	Valentina Rodini; Federica Cesarini	Italy	6:59.69	SA/B
3	Anneka Reardon; Lucy Coleman	Australia	7:01.68	SC/D
4	Natalia Miguel Gómez; Rocio Lao Sanchez	Spain	7:14.26	SC/D
5	Alessia Palacios; Valeria Palacios	Peru	7:16.68	SC/D
6	Nourelhoda Arafa; Maryam Abdellatif	Egypt	7:25.21	SC/D

=== Semifinals C/D ===
The three fastest boats in each semifinal advanced to the C final. The remaining boats were sent to the D final.

==== Semifinal 1 ====
Rank	Rower	Country	Time	Notes
1	Louisa Altenhuber; Laura Tiefenthaler	Austria	7:46.84	FC
2	Marion Reichardt; Johanna Reichardt	Germany	7:52.95	FC
3	Natalia Miguel Gómez; Rocio Lao Sanchez	Spain	8:05.60	FC
4	Nourelhoda Arafa; Maryam Abdellatif	Egypt	8:11.31	FD

==== Semifinal 2 ====
Rank	Rower	Country	Time	Notes
1	Anneka Reardon; Lucy Coleman	Australia	7:40.09	FC
2	Mathilde Persson; Marie Morch-Pedersen	Denmark	7:43.60	FC
3	Selma Dhaouadi; Khadija Krimi	Tunisia	8:00.56	FC
4	Alessia Palacios; Valeria Palacios	Peru	8:12.50	FD

=== Semifinals A/B ===
The three fastest boats in each semifinal advanced to the A final. The remaining boats were sent to the B final.

==== Semifinal 1 ====
Rank	Rower	Country	Time	Notes
1	Emily Craig; Imogen Grant	Great Britain	7:23.83	FA
2	Mariana-Laura Dumitru; Ionela Cozmiuc	Romania	7:28.24	FA
3	Zou Jiaqi; Qiu Xiuping	China	7:31.35	FA
4	Martyna Radosz; Katarzyna Welna	Poland	7:32.82	FB
5	Dimitra Kontou; Zoi Fitsiou	Greece	7:41.04	FB
6	Valentina Rodini; Federica Cesarini	Italy	7:41.33	FB

==== Semifinal 2 ====
Rank	Rower	Country	Time	Notes
1	Jill Moffatt; Jennifer Casson	Canada	7:23.12	FA
2	Shannon Cox; Jackie Kiddle	New Zealand	7:23.78	FA
3	Michelle Sechser; Mary Jones	United States	7:24.32	FA
4	Aoife Casey; Margaret Cremen	Ireland	7:24.67	FB
5	Laura Tarantola; Claire Bové	France	7:32.73	FB
6	Patricia Merz; Frédérique Rol	Switzerland	7:36.96	FB

=== Finals ===
The A final determined the rankings for places 1 to 6. Additional rankings were determined in the other finals.

==== Final D ====
Rank	Rower	Country	Time	Total rank
1	Alessia Palacios; Valeria Palacios	Peru	7:13.77	19
2	Nourelhoda Arafa; Maryam Abdellatif	Egypt	7:16.90	20

==== Final C ====
Rank	Rower	Country	Time	Total rank
1	Anneka Reardon; Lucy Coleman	Australia	6:57.16	13
2	Louisa Altenhuber; Lara Tiefenthaler	Austria	7:00.49	14
3	Mathilde Persson; Marie Morch-Pedersen	Denmark	7:01.96	15
4	Marion Reichardt; Johanna Reichardt	Germany	7:04.85	16
5	Natalia Miguel Gómez; Rocio Lao Sanchez	Spain	7:06.80	17
6	Selma Dhaouadi; Khadija Krimi	Tunisia	7:11.27	18

==== Final B ====
Rank	Rower	Country	Time	Total rank
1	Aoife Casey; Margaret Cremen	Ireland	7:03.39	7
2	Martyna Radosz; Katarzyna Welna	Poland	7:04.44	8
3	Valentina Rodini; Federica Cesarini	Italy	7:10.21	9
4	Patricia Merz; Frédérique Rol	Switzerland	7:11.14	10
5	Laura Tarantola; Claire Bové	France	7:12.22	11
6	Dimitra Kontou; Zoi Fitsiou	Greece	7:13.12	12

==== Final A ====
Rank	Rower	Country	Time
1st place, gold medalist(s)	Emily Craig; Imogen Grant	Great Britain	7:19.23
2nd place, silver medalist(s)	Michelle Sechser; Mary Jones	United States	7:22.89
3rd place, bronze medalist(s)	Mariana-Laura Dumitru; Ionela Cozmiuc	Romania	7:23.70
4	Jill Moffatt; Jennifer Casson	Canada	7:25.77
5	Shannon Cox; Jackie Kiddle	New Zealand	7:27.81
6	Zou Jiaqi; Qiu Xiuping	China	7:31.78
