= 2018 World Rowing Championships – Women's lightweight double sculls =

Women's lightweight double sculls at the 2018 World Rowing Championships
- Venue: Plovdiv Regatta Venue
- Location: Plovdiv, Bulgaria
- Dates: 9–15 September
- Competitors: 38 from 19 nations
- Winning time: 6:50.71

Medalists
gold medal	Ionela-Livia Cozmiuc; Gianina Beleagă	Romania
silver medal	Emily Schmieg; Mary Jones	United States
bronze medal	Marieke Keijser; Ilse Paulis	Netherlands

The women's lightweight double sculls competition at the 2018 World Rowing Championships in Plovdiv took place at the Plovdiv Regatta Venue.

== Schedule ==
The schedule was as follows:

Date	Time	Round
Sunday 9 September 2018	15:00	Heats
Tuesday 11 September 2018	10:57	Repechages
Thursday 13 September 2018	11:36	Semifinals A/B
Thursday 13 September 2018	15:01	Semifinals C/D
Saturday 15 September 2018	09:54	Final B
Saturday 15 September 2018	12:01	Final A
Saturday 15 September 2018	15:01	Final C
Saturday 15 September 2018	15:49	Final D

All times are Eastern European Summer Time (UTC+3)

== Results ==
=== Heats ===
The two fastest boats in each heat advanced directly to the A/B semifinals. The remaining boats were sent to the repechages.

==== Heat 1 ====
Rank	Rowers	Country	Time	Notes
1	Kirsten McCann; Nicole van Wyk	South Africa	6:54.31	SA/B
2	Valentina Rodini; Federica Cesarini	Italy	6:54.91	SA/B
3	Patricia Merz; Frédérique Rol	Switzerland	6:55.39	R
4	Eleanor Piggott; Emily Craig	Great Britain	6:58.59	R
5	Natsumi Yamaryo; Ayami Oishi	Japan	6:59.24	R

==== Heat 2 ====
Rank	Rowers	Country	Time	Notes
1	Emily Schmieg; Mary Jones	United States	6:58.59	SA/B
2	Weronika Deresz; Joanna Dorociak	Poland	7:07.52	SA/B
3	Louisa Altenhuber; Laura Arndorfer	Austria	7:09.38	R
4	Nawel Chiali; Zoubida Lachoub	Algeria	7:21.52	R
5	Matinee Raruen; Phuttharaksa Neegree	Thailand	7:27.07	R

==== Heat 3 ====
Rank	Rowers	Country	Time	Notes
1	Zoe McBride; Jackie Kiddle	New Zealand	6:50.04	SA/B
2	Amy James; Sarah Pound	Australia	6:51.11	SA/B
3	Katherine Haber; Jennifer Casson	Canada	6:51.45	R
4	Aoife Casey; Denise Walsh	Ireland	7:02.25	R
5	Emma Benany; Asmaa Alzohairy	Egypt	8:10.82	R

==== Heat 4 ====
Rank	Rowers	Country	Time	Notes
1	Marieke Keijser; Ilse Paulis	Netherlands	6:59.43	SA/B
2	Ionela-Livia Cozmiuc; Gianina Beleagă	Romania	7:02.83	SA/B
3	Katrin Thoma; Leonie Pless	Germany	7:10.41	R
4	Rocio Lao Sanchez; Natalia de Miguel	Spain	7:23.43	R

=== Repechages ===
The two fastest boats in each repechage advanced to the A/B semifinals. The remaining boats were sent to the C/D semifinals.

==== Repechage 1 ====
Rank	Rowers	Country	Time	Notes
1	Patricia Merz; Frédérique Rol	Switzerland	6:57.90	SA/B
2	Natsumi Yamaryo; Ayami Oishi	Japan	7:00.67	SA/B
3	Aoife Casey; Denise Walsh	Ireland	7:03.88	SC/D
4	Louisa Altenhuber; Laura Arndorfer	Austria	7:06.78	SC/D
5	Rocio Lao Sanchez; Natalia de Miguel	Spain	7:16.14	SC/D
6	Emma Benany; Asmaa Alzohairy	Egypt	7:50.07	SC/D

==== Repechage 2 ====
Rank	Rowers	Country	Time	Notes
1	Eleanor Piggott; Emily Craig	Great Britain	6:57.14	SA/B
2	Katherine Haber; Jennifer Casson	Canada	7:00.60	SA/B
3	Katrin Thoma; Leonie Pless	Germany	7:12.65	SC/D
4	Matinee Raruen; Phuttharaksa Neegree	Thailand	7:16.95	SC/D
5	Nawel Chiali; Zoubida Lachoub	Algeria	7:23.96	SC/D

=== Semifinals C/D ===
All but the slowest boat in each semi were sent to the C final. The slowest boats were sent to the D final.

==== Semifinal 1 ====
Rank	Rowers	Country	Time	Notes
1	Aoife Casey; Denise Walsh	Ireland	7:20.51	FC
2	Rocio Lao Sanchez; Natalia de Miguel	Spain	7:24.08	FC
3	Matinee Raruen; Phuttharaksa Neegree	Thailand	7:31.21	FD

==== Semifinal 2 ====
Rank	Rowers	Country	Time	Notes
1	Louisa Altenhuber; Laura Arndorfer	Austria	7:15.65	FC
2	Katrin Thoma; Leonie Pless	Germany	7:25.53	FC
3	Nawel Chiali; Zoubida Lachoub	Algeria	7:28.06	FC
4	Emma Benany; Asmaa Alzohairy	Egypt	7:56.02	FD

=== Semifinals A/B ===
The three fastest boats in each semi advanced to the A final. The remaining boats were sent to the B final.

==== Semifinal 1 ====
Rank	Rowers	Country	Time	Notes
1	Ionela-Livia Cozmiuc; Gianina Beleagă	Romania	6:59.23	FA
2	Emily Schmieg; Mary Jones	United States	6:59.95	FA
3	Patricia Merz; Frédérique Rol	Switzerland	7:01.11	FA
4	Katherine Haber; Jennifer Casson	Canada	7:01.50	FB
5	Kirsten McCann; Nicole van Wyk	South Africa	7:02.48	FB
6	Amy James; Sarah Pound	Australia	7:09.18	FB

==== Semifinal 2 ====
Rank	Rowers	Country	Time	Notes
1	Marieke Keijser; Ilse Paulis	Netherlands	7:05.62	FA
2	Zoe McBride; Jackie Kiddle	New Zealand	7:06.75	FA
3	Eleanor Piggott; Emily Craig	Great Britain	7:07.09	FA
4	Weronika Deresz; Joanna Dorociak	Poland	7:12.72	FB
5	Valentina Rodini; Federica Cesarini	Italy	7:12.90	FB
6	Natsumi Yamaryo; Ayami Oishi	Japan	7:14.41	FB

=== Finals ===
The A final determined the rankings for places 1 to 6. Additional rankings were determined in the other finals.

==== Final D ====
Rank	Rowers	Country	Time
1	Matinee Raruen; Phuttharaksa Neegree	Thailand	7:19.19
2	Emma Benany; Asmaa Alzohairy	Egypt	7:52.69

==== Final C ====
Rank	Rowers	Country	Time
1	Aoife Casey; Denise Walsh	Ireland	7:05.77
2	Louisa Altenhuber; Laura Arndorfer	Austria	7:08.29
3	Katrin Thoma; Leonie Pless	Germany	7:09.12
4	Rocio Lao Sanchez; Natalia de Miguel	Spain	7:13.31
5	Nawel Chiali; Zoubida Lachoub	Algeria	7:20.59

==== Final B ====
Rank	Rowers	Country	Time
1	Valentina Rodini; Federica Cesarini	Italy	7:04.91
2	Kirsten McCann; Nicole van Wyk	South Africa	7:06.40
3	Katherine Haber; Jennifer Casson	Canada	7:07.07
4	Natsumi Yamaryo; Ayami Oishi	Japan	7:07.96
5	Weronika Deresz; Joanna Dorociak	Poland	7:08.77
6	Amy James; Sarah Pound	Australia	7:09.28

==== Final A ====
Rank	Rowers	Country	Time
1st place, gold medalist(s)	Ionela-Livia Cozmiuc; Gianina Beleagă	Romania	6:50.71
2nd place, silver medalist(s)	Emily Schmieg; Mary Jones	United States	6:52.30
3rd place, bronze medalist(s)	Marieke Keijser; Ilse Paulis	Netherlands	6:52.56
4	Patricia Merz; Frédérique Rol	Switzerland	6:54.80
5	Eleanor Piggott; Emily Craig	Great Britain	6:55.81
6	Zoe McBride; Jackie Kiddle	New Zealand	6:57.79
