= Rowing at the 2024 Summer Olympics – Women's lightweight double sculls =

Women's lightweight double sculls at the Games of the XXXIII Olympiad
- Olympic rowing
- Venue: Stade nautique de Vaires-sur-Marne, National Olympic Nautical Stadium of Île-de-France, Vaires-sur-Marne
- Dates: 28 July – 2 August 2024

Medalists
1st place, gold medalist(s)		Emily Craig; Imogen Grant	Great Britain
2nd place, silver medalist(s)		Gianina Beleagă; Ionela Cozmiuc	Romania
3rd place, bronze medalist(s)		Dimitra Kontou; Zoi Fitsiou	Greece

The women's lightweight double sculls event at the 2024 Summer Olympics took place from 28 July to 2 August 2024 at the Stade nautique de Vaires-sur-Marne, National Olympic Nautical Stadium of Île-de-France in Vaires-sur-Marne. 32 rowers from 16 nations competed. This event is not planned to return at the 2028 Summer Olympics, where it will instead be replaced by coastal rowing, in the form of the beach sprint rowing events.

== Records ==
Prior to this competition, the existing world and Olympic records were as follows:

World Best
World record	Great Britain	6:40.47	Varese, Italy	2023
Olympic record	Italy	6:41.36	Tokyo, Japan	2021

== Results ==
=== Heats ===
The first two of each heat qualified for the semifinals, while the remainder went to the repechage.

==== Heat 1 ====
Rank	Lane	Rower	Nation	Time	Notes
1	5	Emily Craig; Imogen Grant	Great Britain	7:04.20	Q
2	6	Dimitra Kontou; Zoi Fitsiou	Greece	7:08.51	Q
3	1	Aoife Casey; Margaret Cremen	Ireland	7:12.89	R
4	3	Louisa Altenhuber; Lara Tiefenthaler	Austria	7:24.14	R
5	2	Khadija Krimi; Selma Dhaouadi	Tunisia	7:31.19	R
6	4	Sonia Baluzzo Chiaruzzo; Evelyn Silvestro	Argentina	7:36.43	R

==== Heat 2 ====
Rank	Lane	Rower	Nation	Time	Notes
1	4	Gianina Beleagă; Ionela Cozmiuc	Romania	7:03.83	Q
2	5	Molly Reckford; Michelle Sechser	United States	7:12.65	Q
3	2	Alessia Palacios; Valeria Palacios	Peru	7:32.68	R
4	3	Mahsa Javer; Zeinab Norouzi	Iran	7:35.97	R
5	1	Emi Hirouchi; Ayami Oishi	Japan	7:39.17	R

==== Heat 3 ====
Rank	Lane	Rower	Nation	Time	Notes
1	4	Shannon Cox; Jackie Kiddle	New Zealand	7:02.25	Q
2	3	Claire Bové; Laura Tarantola	France	7:03.22	Q
3	2	Jennifer Casson; Jill Moffatt	Canada	7:09.45	R
4	5	Martyna Radosz; Katarzyna Wełna	Poland	7:11.14	R
5	1	Zou Jiaqi; Qiu Xiuping	China	7:39.17	R

=== Repechages ===
The first three of each heat qualified for the semifinals, while the remainder went to Final C.

==== Repechage 1 ====
Rank	Lane	Rower	Nation	Time	Notes
1	4	Aoife Casey; Margaret Cremen	Ireland	7:11.38	Q
2	3	Jennifer Casson; Jill Moffatt	Canada	7:16.81	Q
3	1	Sonia Baluzzo Chiaruzzo; Evelyn Silvestro	Argentina	7:29.76	Q
4	2	Mahsa Javer; Zeinab Norouzi	Iran	7:35.56	FC
5	5	Zou Jiaqi; Qiu Xiuping	China	7:42.66	FC

==== Repechage 2 ====
Rank	Lane	Rower	Nation	Time	Notes
1	2	Martyna Radosz; Katarzyna Wełna	Poland	7:16.26	Q
2	4	Louisa Altenhuber; Lara Tiefenthaler	Austria	7:17.77	Q
3	1	Khadija Krimi; Selma Dhaouadi	Tunisia	7:25.21	Q
4	3	Alessia Palacios; Valeria Palacios	Peru	7:28.58	FC
5	5	Emi Hirouchi; Ayami Oishi	Japan	7:31.14	FC

=== Semifinals ===
==== Semifinal A/B 1 ====
Rank	Lane	Rower	Nation	Time	Notes
1	3	Emily Craig; Imogen Grant	Great Britain	6:59.79	FA
2	4	Shannon Cox; Jackie Kiddle	New Zealand	7:02.86	FA
3	2	Molly Reckford; Michelle Sechser	United States	7:05.03	FA
4	5	Martyna Radosz; Katarzyna Wełna	Poland	7:06.69	FB
5	1	Jennifer Casson; Jill Moffatt	Canada	7:13.36	FB
6	6	Sonia Baluzzo Chiaruzzo; Evelyn Silvestro	Argentina	7:33.41	FB

==== Semifinal A/B 2 ====
Rank	Lane	Rower	Nation	Time	Notes
1	3	Gianina Beleagă; Ionela Cozmiuc	Romania	6:56.65	FA
2	2	Dimitra Kontou; Zoi Fitsiou	Greece	6:57.90	FA
3	5	Aoife Casey; Margaret Cremen	Ireland	6:59.72	FA
4	4	Claire Bové; Laura Tarantola	France	7:03.22	FB
5	1	Louisa Altenhuber; Lara Tiefenthaler	Austria	7:19.70	FB
6	6	Khadija Krimi; Selma Dhaouadi	Tunisia	7:26.39	FB

=== Finals ===
==== Final C ====
Rank	Lane	Rower	Nation	Time	Notes
13	1	Zou Jiaqi; Qiu Xiuping	China	7:07.55	
14	2	Alessia Palacios; Valeria Palacios	Peru	7:12.27	
15	4	Emi Hirouchi; Ayami Oishi	Japan	7:14.00	
16	3	Mahsa Javer; Zeinab Norouzi	Iran	7:14.32	

==== Final B ====
Rank	Lane	Rower	Nation	Time	Notes
7	3	Claire Bové; Laura Tarantola	France	7:03.24	
8	2	Jennifer Casson; Jill Moffatt	Canada	7:04.82	
9	4	Martyna Radosz; Katarzyna Wełna	Poland	7:08.47	
10	5	Louisa Altenhuber; Lara Tiefenthaler	Austria	7:10.02	
11	1	Khadija Krimi; Selma Dhaouadi	Tunisia	7:21.65	
12	6	Sonia Baluzzo Chiaruzzo; Evelyn Silvestro	Argentina	7:25.86	

==== Final A ====
Rank	Lane	Rower	Nation	Time	Notes
1st place, gold medalist(s)	3	Emily Craig; Imogen Grant	Great Britain	6:47.06	
2nd place, silver medalist(s)	4	Gianina Beleagă; Ionela Cozmiuc	Romania	6:48.78	
3rd place, bronze medalist(s)	2	Dimitra Kontou; Zoi Fitsiou	Greece	6:49.28	
4	5	Shannon Cox; Jackie Kiddle	New Zealand	6:51.65	
5	1	Aoife Casey; Margaret Cremen	Ireland	6:54.57	
6	6	Molly Reckford; Michelle Sechser	United States	6:55.60	
