= 2022 World Rowing Championships – Women's lightweight double sculls =

Women's lightweight double sculls at the 2022 World Rowing Championships
- Venue: Labe aréna
- Location: Račice, Czech Republic
- Dates: 19 September – 24 September
- Competitors: 48 from 24 nations
- Winning time: 6:54.78

Medalists
gold medal	Emily Craig; Imogen Grant	Great Britain
silver medal	Mary Reckford; Michelle Sechser	United States
bronze medal	Aoife Casey; Margaret Cremen	Ireland

The women's lightweight double sculls competition at the 2022 World Rowing Championships took place at the Račice regatta venue.

== Schedule ==
The schedule was as follows:

Date	Time	Round
Monday 19 September 2022	10:26	Heats
Tuesday 20 September 2022	12:19	Repechages
Thursday 22 September 2022	11:05	Semifinals A/B
Thursday 22 September 2022	15:50	Semifinals C/D
Saturday 24 September 2022	10:06	Final D
Saturday 24 September 2022	10:40	Final C
Saturday 24 September 2022	12:04	Final B
Saturday 24 September 2022	14:07	Final A

All times are Central European Summer Time (UTC+2)

== Results ==
=== Heats ===
The first boats in each heat advanced directly to the semifinals A/B. The remaining boats were sent to the repechages.

==== Heat 1 ====
Rank	Rower	Country	Time	Notes
1	Emily Craig; Imogen Grant	Great Britain	6:55.47	SA/B
2	Patricia Merz; Frédérique Rol	Switzerland	7:02.25	R
3	Rachael Kennedy; Jackie Kiddle	New Zealand	7:09.42	R
4	Veronika Činková; Kristýna Neuhortová	Czech Republic	7:16.51	R
5	Wong Sheung Yee; Winne Hung	Hong Kong	7:27.72	R
6	Salma Abdelrahman; Huda Fahmy Mansour	Egypt	7:36.74	R

==== Heat 2 ====
Rank	Rower	Country	Time	Notes
1	Mary Reckford; Michelle Sechser	United States	6:57.60	SA/B
2	Dimitra Kontou; Evangelia Anastasiadou	Greece	7:06.91	R
3	Anneka Reardon; Lucy Coleman	Australia	7:09.91	R
4	Rocio Lao Sanchez; Ana Navarro	Spain	7:12.12	R
5	Maia Lund; Oda Aagesen	Norway	7:12.48	R
6	Sahoko Kinota; Chiaki Tomita	Japan	7:25.52	R

==== Heat 3 ====
Rank	Rower	Country	Time	Notes
1	Aoife Casey; Margaret Cremen	Ireland	7:02.77	SA/B
2	Marion Reichardt; Johanna Reichardt	Germany	7:07.10	R
3	Valentina Rodini; Federica Cesarini	Italy	7:08.35	R
4	Samantha Ojeda; Melissa Marquez	Mexico	7:28.97	R
5	Chelsea Corputty; Mutiara Rahma Putri	Indonesia	7:35.55	R
6	Hsieh I-ching; Lee Kuan-yi	Chinese Taipei	8:02.10	R

==== Heat 4 ====
Rank	Rower	Country	Time	Notes
1	Laura Tarantola; Claire Bové	France	6:58.23	SA/B
2	Jennifer Casson; Jill Moffatt	Canada	7:00.38	R
3	Zou Jiaqi; Qiu Xiuping	China	7:03.54	R
4	Wiktoria Kalinowska; Katarzyna Welna	Poland	7:08.90	R
5	Mathilde Persson; Marie Morch-Pedersen	Denmark	7:15.16	R
6	Lara Tiefenthaler; Valentina Cavallar	Austria	7:23.34	R

=== Repechages ===
The two fastest boats in repechage advanced to the semifinals A/B. The remaining boats were sent to the C/D semifinals.

==== Repechages 1 ====
Rank	Rower	Country	Time	Notes
1	Patricia Merz; Frédérique Rol	Switzerland	7:06.46	SA/B
2	Anneka Reardon; Lucy Coleman	Australia	7:09.25	SA/B
3	Mathilde Persson; Marie Morch-Pedersen	Denmark	7:13.39	SC/D
4	Salma Abdelrahman; Huda Fahmy Mansour	Egypt	7:28.95	SC/D
5	Samantha Ojeda; Melissa Marquez	Mexico	7:30.54	SC/D

==== Repechages 2 ====
Rank	Rower	Country	Time	Notes
1	Dimitra Kontou; Evangelia Anastasiadou	Greece	7:02.40	SA/B
2	Valentina Rodini; Federica Cesarini	Italy	7:04.67	SA/B
3	Wiktoria Kalinowska; Katarzyna Welna	Poland	7:04.70	SC/D
4	Sahoko Kinota; Chiaki Tomita	Japan	7:18.54	SC/D
5	Wong Sheung Yee; Winne Hung	Hong Kong	7:27.96	SC/D

==== Repechages 3 ====
Rank	Rower	Country	Time	Notes
1	Zou Jiaqi; Qiu Xiuping	China	7:09.57	SA/B
2	Marion Reichardt; Johanna Reichardt	Germany	7:11.75	SA/B
3	Veronika Činková; Kristýna Neuhortová	Czech Republic	7:12.11	SC/D
4	Maia Lund; Oda Aagesen	Norway	7:14.56	SC/D
5	Hsieh I-ching; Lee Kuan-yi	Chinese Taipei	7:51.25	SC/D

==== Repechages 4 ====
Rank	Rower	Country	Time	Notes
1	Jennifer Casson; Jill Moffatt	Canada	7:15.75	SA/B
2	Rachael Kennedy; Jackie Kiddle	New Zealand	7:17.65	SA/B
3	Rocio Lao Sanchez; Ana Navarro	Spain	7:24.69	SC/D
4	Lara Tiefenthaler; Valentina Cavallar	Austria	7:36.22	SC/D
5	Chelsea Corputty; Mutiara Rahma Putri	Indonesia	7:40.99	SC/D

=== Semifinals C/D ===
The three fastest boats in each semi advanced to the C final. The remaining boats were sent to the D final.

==== Semifinal 1 ====
Rank	Rower	Country	Time	Notes
1	Mathilde Persson; Marie Morch-Pedersen	Denmark	7:22.02	FC
2	Veronika Činková; Kristýna Neuhortová	Czech Republic	7:24.61	FC
3	Sahoko Kinota; Chiaki Tomita	Japan	7:25.09	FC
4	Lara Tiefenthaler; Valentina Cavallar	Austria	7:25.55	FD
5	Samantha Ojeda; Melissa Marquez	Mexico	7:47.67	FD
6	Hsieh I-ching; Lee Kuan-yi	Chinese Taipei	8:07.51	FD

==== Semifinal 2 ====
Rank	Rower	Country	Time	Notes
1	Wiktoria Kalinowska; Katarzyna Welna	Poland	7:22.39	FC
2	Rocio Lao Sanchez; Ana Navarro	Spain	7:22.40	FC
3	Maia Lund; Oda Aagesen	Norway	7:27.77	FC
4	Wong Sheung Yee; Winne Hung	Hong Kong	7:42.67	FD
5	Chelsea Corputty; Mutiara Rahma Putri	Indonesia	7:43.56	FD
6	Salma Abdelrahman; Huda Fahmy Mansour	Egypt	7:56.28	FD

=== Semifinals A/B ===
The three fastest boats in each semi advanced to the A final. The remaining boats were sent to the B final.

==== Semifinal 1 ====
Rank	Rower	Country	Time	Notes
1	Emily Craig; Imogen Grant	Great Britain	6:58.67	FA
2	Aoife Casey; Margaret Cremen	Ireland	7:02.15	FA
3	Dimitra Kontou; Evangelia Anastasiadou	Greece	7:04.43	FA
4	Anneka Reardon; Lucy Coleman	Australia	7:07.51	FB
5	Jennifer Casson; Jill Moffatt	Canada	7:07.73	FB
6	Marion Reichardt; Johanna Reichardt	Germany	7:17.62	FB

==== Semifinal 2 ====
Rank	Rower	Country	Time	Notes
1	Mary Reckford; Michelle Sechser	United States	7:01.03	FA
2	Laura Tarantola; Claire Bové	France	7:04.23	FA
3	Patricia Merz; Frédérique Rol	Switzerland	7:05.28	FA
4	Valentina Rodini; Federica Cesarini	Italy	7:05.50	FB
5	Zou Jiaqi; Qiu Xiuping	China	7:09.64	FB
6	Rachael Kennedy; Jackie Kiddle	New Zealand	7:16.96	FB

=== Finals ===
The A final determined the rankings for places 1 to 6. Additional rankings were determined in the other finals.

==== Final D ====
Rank	Rower	Country	Time	Total rank
1	Lara Tiefenthaler; Valentina Cavallar	Austria	7:24.36	19
2	Chelsea Corputty; Mutiara Rahma Putri	Indonesia	7:30.99	20
3	Samantha Ojeda; Melissa Marquez	Mexico	7:32.20	21
4	Wong Sheung Yee; Winne Hung	Hong Kong	7:34.91	22
5	Salma Abdelrahman; Huda Fahmy Mansour	Egypt	7:42.75	23
6	Hsieh I-ching; Lee Kuan-yi	Chinese Taipei	8:00.43	24

==== Final C ====
Rank	Rower	Country	Time	Total rank
1	Wiktoria Kalinowska; Katarzyna Welna	Poland	7:14.43	13
2	Rocio Lao Sanchez; Ana Navarro	Spain	7:19.72	14
3	Maia Lund; Oda Aagesen	Norway	7:20.64	15
4	Mathilde Persson; Marie Morch-Pedersen	Denmark	7:21.43	16
5	Veronika Činková; Kristýna Neuhortová	Czech Republic	7:22.81	17
6	Sahoko Kinota; Chiaki Tomita	Japan	7:23.44	18

==== Final B ====
Rank	Rower	Country	Time	Total rank
1	Jennifer Casson; Jill Moffatt	Canada	7:07.29	7
2	Zou Jiaqi; Qiu Xiuping	China	7:08.05	8
3	Rachael Kennedy; Jackie Kiddle	New Zealand	7:08.39	9
4	Anneka Reardon; Lucy Coleman	Australia	7:09.17	10
5	Valentina Rodini; Federica Cesarini	Italy	7:11.33	11
6	Marion Reichardt; Johanna Reichardt	Germany	7:18.47	12

==== Final A ====
Rank	Rower	Country	Time	Notes
1st place, gold medalist(s)	Emily Craig; Imogen Grant	Great Britain	6:54.78	
2nd place, silver medalist(s)	Mary Reckford; Michelle Sechser	United States	6:57.92	
3rd place, bronze medalist(s)	Aoife Casey; Margaret Cremen	Ireland	7:00.62	
4	Laura Tarantola; Claire Bové	France	7:02.98	
5	Patricia Merz; Frédérique Rol	Switzerland	7:04.96	
6	Dimitra Kontou; Evangelia Anastasiadou	Greece	7:07.53	
