= Rowing at the 2020 Summer Olympics – Women's lightweight double sculls =

Olympic rowing event

Women's lightweight double sculls at the Games of the XXXII Olympiad
- Olympic rowing
- Venue: Sea Forest Waterway
- Dates: 24–29 July 2021
- Competitors: 36 from 18 nations
- Winning time: 6:47.54

Medalists
1st place, gold medalist(s)		Valentina Rodini; Federica Cesarini	Italy
2nd place, silver medalist(s)		Laura Tarantola; Claire Bové	France
3rd place, bronze medalist(s)		Marieke Keijser; Ilse Paulis	Netherlands

The women's lightweight double sculls event at the 2020 Summer Olympics took place from 24 to 29 July 2021 at the Sea Forest Waterway. 36 rowers from 18 nations competed.

== Schedule ==
The competition was held over six days.

All times are Japan Standard Time (UTC+9)

Date	Time	Round
Saturday, 24 July 2021	10:20	Heats
Sunday, 25 July 2021	10:20	Repechage
Wednesday, 28 July 2021	11:40	Semifinals A/B*
Thursday, 29 July 2021	9:00	Final B*
Thursday, 29 July 2021	10:10	Final A
Thursday, 29 July 2021	11:30	Final C*

^{* Event has been rescheduled.}

== Results ==
=== Heats ===
The first two of each heat qualified for the semifinals, while the remainder went to the repechage.

==== Heat 1 ====
Rank	Lane	Rower	Nation	Time	Notes
1	2	Laura Tarantola; Claire Bové	France	7:03.47	Q
2	1	Valentina Rodini; Federica Cesarini	Italy	7:04.66	Q
3	6	Mary Reckford; Michelle Sechser	United States	7:05.30	R
4	3	Patricia Merz; Frédérique Rol	Switzerland	7:08.66	R
5	4	Aoife Casey; Margaret Cremen	Ireland	7:17.67	R
6	5	Mutiara Rahma Putri; Melani Putri	Indonesia	7:52.57	R

==== Heat 2 ====
Rank	Lane	Rower	Nation	Time	Notes
1	4	Marieke Keijser; Ilse Paulis	Netherlands	7:07.73	Q
2	1	Jill Moffatt; Jennifer Casson	Canada	7:11.30	Q
3	6	Chiaki Tomita; Ayami Oishi	Japan	7:22.47	R
4	5	Lường Thị Thảo; Đinh Thị Hảo	Vietnam	7:36.21	R
5	3	Nour El-Houda Ettaieb; Khadija Krimi	Tunisia	7:39.61	R
6	2	Yulisa López; Jennieffer Zúñiga	Guatemala	7:53.35	R

==== Heat 3 ====
Rank	Lane	Rower	Nation	Time	Notes
1	1	Ionela-Livia Cozmiuc; Gianina Beleagă	Romania	7:01.74	Q
2	5	Emily Craig; Imogen Grant	Great Britain	7:03.29	Q
3	4	Anastasia Lebedeva; Maria Botalova	ROC	7:07.67	R
4	3	Ina Nikulina; Alena Furman	Belarus	7:10.15	R
5	2	Valentina Cavallar; Louisa Altenhuber	Austria	7:26.22	R
6	6	Milka Kraljev; Evelyn Silvestro	Argentina	7:29.27	R

=== Repechage ===
The first three pairs in the repechage qualified for the semifinals, while remaining crew to Final C.

==== Repechage heat 1 ====
Rank	Lane	Rower	Nation	Time	Notes
1	4	Mary Reckford; Michelle Sechser	United States	7:21.25	Q
2	2	Ina Nikulina; Alena Furman	Belarus	7:26.99	Q
3	3	Chiaki Tomita; Ayami Oishi	Japan	7:34.45	Q
4	1	Milka Kraljev; Evelyn Silvestro	Argentina	7:39.53	FC
5	5	Nour El-Houda Ettaieb; Khadija Krimi	Tunisia	7:54.95	FC
6	6	Mutiara Rahma Putri; Melani Putri	Indonesia	8:03.19	FC

==== Repechage heat 2 ====
Rank	Lane	Rower	Nation	Time	Notes
1	4	Patricia Merz; Frédérique Rol	Switzerland	7:22.02	Q
2	3	Anastasia Lebedeva; Maria Botalova	ROC	7:22.72	Q
3	5	Aoife Casey; Margaret Cremen	Ireland	7:23.46	Q
4	1	Valentina Cavallar; Louisa Altenhuber	Austria	7:42.31	FC
5	2	Lường Thị Thảo; Đinh Thị Hảo	Vietnam	7:53.69	FC
6	6	Yulisa López; Jennieffer Zúñiga	Guatemala	8:13.27	FC

=== Semifinals ===
==== Semifinal A/B 1 ====
Rank	Lane	Rower	Nation	Time	Notes
1	5	Emily Craig; Imogen Grant	Great Britain	6:41.99	FA
2	3	Laura Tarantola; Claire Bové	France	6:42.92	FA
3	4	Marieke Keijser; Ilse Paulis	Netherlands	6:43.85	FA
4	2	Patricia Merz; Frédérique Rol	Switzerland	6:48.92	FB
5	1	Aoife Casey; Margaret Cremen	Ireland	6:49.24	FB
6	6	Ina Nikulina; Alena Furman	Belarus	6:54.78	FB

==== Semifinal A/B 2 ====
Rank	Lane	Rower	Nation	Time	Notes
1	4	Valentina Rodini; Federica Cesarini	Italy	6:41.36 WB	FA
2	5	Mary Reckford; Michelle Sechser	United States	6:41.54	FA
3	3	Ionela-Livia Cozmiuc; Gianina Beleagă	Romania	6:42.08	FA
4	1	Anastasia Lebedeva; Maria Botalova	ROC	6:45.23	FB
5	6	Chiaki Tomita; Ayami Oishi	Japan	6:56.52	FB
6	2	Jill Moffatt; Jennifer Casson	Canada	7:00.82	FB

=== Finals ===
==== Final C ====
Rank	Lane	Rower	Nation	Time	Notes
13	3	Milka Kraljev; Evelyn Silvestro	Argentina	7:05.82	
14	4	Valentina Cavallar; Louisa Altenhuber	Austria	7:15.25	
15	2	Lường Thị Thảo; Đinh Thị Hảo	Vietnam	7:19.05	
16	5	Nour El-Houda Ettaieb; Khadija Krimi	Tunisia	7:22.25	
17	1	Mutiara Rahma Putri; Melani Putri	Indonesia	7:25.06	
18	6	Yulisa López; Jennieffer Zúñiga	Guatemala	7:27.51	

==== Final B ====
Rank	Lane	Rower	Nation	Time	Notes
7	3	Patricia Merz; Frédérique Rol	Switzerland	6:49.16	
8	5	Aoife Casey; Margaret Cremen	Ireland	6:49.90	
9	4	Anastasia Lebedeva; Maria Botalova	ROC	6:51.65	
10	2	Chiaki Tomita; Ayami Oishi	Japan	6:54.94	
11	6	Ina Nikulina; Alena Furman	Belarus	6:57.84	
12	1	Jill Moffatt; Jennifer Casson	Canada	6:59.72	

==== Final A ====
Rank	Lane	Rower	Nation	Time	Notes
1st place, gold medalist(s)	4	Valentina Rodini; Federica Cesarini	Italy	6:47.54	
2nd place, silver medalist(s)	2	Laura Tarantola; Claire Bové	France	6:47.68	
3rd place, bronze medalist(s)	1	Marieke Keijser; Ilse Paulis	Netherlands	6:48.03	
4	3	Emily Craig; Imogen Grant	Great Britain	6:48.04	
5	5	Mary Reckford; Michelle Sechser	United States	6:48.54	
6	6	Ionela-Livia Cozmiuc; Gianina Beleagă	Romania	6:49.40	
