= Stonor Challenge Trophy =

Annual rowing event

- Venue: Henley Royal Regatta, River Thames
- Location: Henley-on-Thames, Oxfordshire
- Dates: 2017–present

Stonor Challenge Trophy is a rowing event for women's double sculls at the annual Henley Royal Regatta on the River Thames at Henley-on-Thames in England.

The event is open to members of any club but the crew must be of British Rowing Senior status in sculling. It was inaugurated in 2017.

== Past winners ==
Year	Winner	Club	Runner-Up	Club	ref
2017	Brooke Donoghue; Olivia Loe	Waiariki RC, NZL	Marloes Oldenburg; Roos de Jong	Hollandia Roeiclub, NED	
2018	Charlotte Hodgkins-Byrne; Anna Thornton	University of London Boat Club; Nottingham Rowing Club	Susannah Duncan; Danielle Semple	Exeter University	
2019	Brooke Donoghue; Olivia Loe	Waiariki RC, NZL	Shiyu Lu; Wang Yuwei	Chinese National Rowing Team	
2020	No competition due to COVID-19 pandemic				
2021	Imogen Grant; Emily Craig	University of London BC; Cambridge University	Georgie Brayshaw; Jess Leyden	Leander Club	
2022	Molly Reckford; Michelle Sechser	United States National Team	Anneka Reardon; Lucy Coleman	Rowing Australia	
2023	Jill Moffatt; Jennifer Casson	Shawnigan Lake School RC, CAN	Vwairé Obukohwo; Katherine S. A. George	Twickenham; Leander	
2024	Sarah Wibberenz; Lisa Gutfleisch	RC Havel Brandenburg; Heidelberger RC 1872	Jenny Bates; Freya Keto	Oxford Brookes; Thames RC	
2025	Evangelia Anastasiadou; Zoi Fitsiou	NC of Kastoria; NC of Mavrochori, Greece	Roos de Jong; Benthe Boonstra	Hollandia Roeiclub	
