= 2017 World Rowing Championships – Women's lightweight double sculls =

Women's lightweight double sculls at the 2017 World Rowing Championships
- Venue: Nathan Benderson Park
- Location: Sarasota, United States
- Dates: 24–30 September
- Competitors: 36 from 18 nations
- Winning time: 6:55.88

Medalists
| gold medal | Ionela-Livia Lehaci; Gianina Beleagă | Romania |
| silver medal | Zoe McBride; Jackie Kiddle | New Zealand |
| bronze medal | Emily Schmieg; Michelle Sechser | United States |

The women's lightweight double sculls competition at the 2017 World Rowing Championships in Sarasota took place in Nathan Benderson Park.

== Schedule ==
The schedule was as follows:

| Date | Time | Round |
|---|---|---|
| Sunday 24 September 2017 | 11:50 | Heats |
| Tuesday 26 September 2017 | 13:00 | Repechages |
| Thursday 28 September 2017 | 12:11 | Semifinals A/B |
| Friday 29 September 2017 | 14:00 | Final C |
| Saturday 30 September 2017 | 09:15 | Final B |
| Saturday 30 September 2017 | 11:08 | Final A |

All times are Eastern Daylight Time (UTC-4)

== Results ==
=== Heats ===
The two fastest boats in each heat advanced directly to the A/B semifinals. The remaining boats were sent to the repechages.

==== Heat 1 ====
| Rank | Rowers | Country | Time | Notes |
|---|---|---|---|---|
| 1 | Zoe McBride; Jackie Kiddle | New Zealand | 7:05.97 | SA/B |
| 2 | Ionela-Livia Lehaci; Gianina Beleagă | Romania | 7:07.28 | SA/B |
| 3 | Aja Runge Holmegaard; Juliane Rasmussen | Denmark | 7:10.82 | R |
| 4 | Allegra Francalacci; Valentina Rodini | Italy | 7:13.01 | R |
| 5 | Katherine Copeland; Emily Craig | Great Britain | 7:13.69 | R |
| 6 | Fabiola Nunez; Melissa Marquez | Mexico | 7:53.41 | R |

==== Heat 2 ====
| Rank | Rowers | Country | Time | Notes |
|---|---|---|---|---|
| 1 | Claire Bove; Laura Tarantola | France | 7:08.47 | SA/B |
| 2 | Chen Fang; Pan Dandan | China | 7:12.93 | SA/B |
| 3 | Fini Sturm; Leonie Pless | Germany | 7:17.36 | R |
| 4 | Pauline Delacroix; Frédérique Rol | Switzerland | 7:18.27 | R |
| 5 | Thomais Emmanouilidou; Maria Pergouli | Greece | 7:23.06 | R |
| – | Glory Semidara; Favour Bewei | Nigeria | EXC | – |

==== Heat 3 ====
| Rank | Rowers | Country | Time | Notes |
|---|---|---|---|---|
| 1 | Weronika Deresz; Joanna Dorociak | Poland | 7:05.43 | SA/B |
| 2 | Emily Schmieg; Michelle Sechser | United States | 7:05.59 | SA/B |
| 3 | Anastasiia Ianina; Anastasia Lebedeva | Russia | 7:08.64 | R |
| 4 | Alice Erkos; Annie Svensson | Sweden | 7:19.31 | R |
| 5 | Yulisa Lopez Guerra; Jenniffer Zuniga | Guatemala | 7:40.12 | R |
| 6 | Camila Valle; Pamela Noya | Peru | 7:47.60 | R |

=== Repechages ===
The three fastest boats in each repechage advanced to the A/B semifinals. The remaining boats were sent to the C final.

==== Repechage 1 ====
| Rank | Rowers | Country | Time | Notes |
|---|---|---|---|---|
| 1 | Aja Runge Holmegaard; Juliane Rasmussen | Denmark | 7:00.83 | SA/B |
| 2 | Fini Sturm; Leonie Pless | Germany | 7:06.32 | SA/B |
| 3 | Thomais Emmanouilidou; Maria Pergouli | Greece | 7:06.75 | SA/B |
| 4 | Alice Erkos; Annie Svensson | Sweden | 7:08.18 | FC |
| 5 | Fabiola Nunez; Melissa Marquez | Mexico | 7:38.32 | FC |
| 6 | Camila Valle; Pamela Noya | Peru | 7:41.94 | FC |

==== Repechage 2 ====
| Rank | Rowers | Country | Time | Notes |
|---|---|---|---|---|
| 1 | Katherine Copeland; Emily Craig | Great Britain | 7:00.00 | SA/B |
| 2 | Allegra Francalacci; Valentina Rodini | Italy | 7:01.65 | SA/B |
| 3 | Anastasiia Ianina; Anastasia Lebedeva | Russia | 7:03.61 | SA/B |
| 4 | Pauline Delacroix; Frédérique Rol | Switzerland | 7:08.42 | FC |
| 5 | Yulisa Lopez Guerra; Jenniffer Zuniga | Guatemala | 7:35.71 | FC |

=== Semifinals ===
The three fastest boats in each semi advanced to the A final. The remaining boats were sent to the B final.

==== Semifinal 1 ====
| Rank | Rowers | Country | Time | Notes |
|---|---|---|---|---|
| 1 | Zoe McBride; Jackie Kiddle | New Zealand | 7:00.83 | FA |
| 2 | Weronika Deresz; Joanna Dorociak | Poland | 7:03.08 | FA |
| 3 | Aja Runge Holmegaard; Juliane Rasmussen | Denmark | 7:04.92 | FA |
| 4 | Chen Fang; Pan Dandan | China | 7:09.03 | FB |
| 5 | Allegra Francalacci; Valentina Rodini | Italy | 7:11.08 | FB |
| 6 | Thomais Emmanouilidou; Maria Pergouli | Greece | 7:16.21 | FB |

==== Semifinal 2 ====
| Rank | Rowers | Country | Time | Notes |
|---|---|---|---|---|
| 1 | Emily Schmieg; Michelle Sechser | United States | 7:00.72 | FA |
| 2 | Ionela-Livia Lehaci; Gianina Beleagă | Romania | 7:02.05 | FA |
| 3 | Katherine Copeland; Emily Craig | Great Britain | 7:02.52 | FA |
| 4 | Claire Bove; Laura Tarantola | France | 7:04.29 | FB |
| 5 | Anastasiia Ianina; Anastasia Lebedeva | Russia | 7:12.05 | FB |
| 6 | Fini Sturm; Leonie Pless | Germany | 7:23.24 | FB |

=== Finals ===
The A final determined the rankings for places 1 to 6. Additional rankings were determined in the other finals.

==== Final C ====
| Rank | Rowers | Country | Time |
|---|---|---|---|
| 1 | Alice Erkos; Annie Svensson | Sweden | 7:06.53 |
| 2 | Pauline Delacroix; Frédérique Rol | Switzerland | 7:06.66 |
| 3 | Yulisa Lopez Guerra; Jenniffer Zuniga | Guatemala | 7:28.61 |
| 4 | Camila Valle; Pamela Noya | Peru | 7:31.21 |
| 5 | Fabiola Nunez; Melissa Marquez | Mexico | 7:36.76 |

==== Final B ====
| Rank | Rowers | Country | Time |
|---|---|---|---|
| 1 | Claire Bove; Laura Tarantola | France | 6:57.63 |
| 2 | Allegra Francalacci; Valentina Rodini | Italy | 6:57.93 |
| 3 | Fini Sturm; Leonie Pless | Germany | 7:04.06 |
| 4 | Chen Fang; Pan Dandan | China | 7:05.56 |
| 5 | Thomais Emmanouilidou; Maria Pergouli | Greece | 7:05.98 |
| 6 | Anastasiia Ianina; Anastasia Lebedeva | Russia | 7:10.80 |

==== Final A ====
| Rank | Rowers | Country | Time |
|---|---|---|---|
| 1st place, gold medalist(s) | Ionela-Livia Lehaci; Gianina Beleagă | Romania | 6:55.88 |
| 2nd place, silver medalist(s) | Zoe McBride; Jackie Kiddle | New Zealand | 6:56.09 |
| 3rd place, bronze medalist(s) | Emily Schmieg; Michelle Sechser | United States | 6:56.38 |
| 4 | Weronika Deresz; Joanna Dorociak | Poland | 7:01.07 |
| 5 | Katherine Copeland; Emily Craig | Great Britain | 7:03.27 |
| 6 | Aja Runge Holmegaard; Juliane Rasmussen | Denmark | 7:05.53 |
