= Rowing at the 2013 Summer Universiade – Women's lightweight double sculls =

The women's lightweight double sculls competition at the 2013 Summer Universiade in Kazan took place the Kazan Rowing Centre.

== Results ==
=== Heats ===
==== Heat 1 ====
Rank	Rower	Country	Time	Notes
1	Iryna Liaskova; Alena Kryvasheyenka	Belarus	7:32.53	Q
2	Anna Yazykova; Natalia Varfolomeeva	Russia	7:35.19	Q
3	Kim Sol-ji; Park Yeon-hee	South Korea	7:37.69	R
4	Charlotte Culty; Camille Leclerc	France	7:44.44	R
5	Stine Hammer; Kari Ælveborn	Norway	8:11.11	R

==== Heat 2 ====
Rank	Rower	Country	Time	Notes
1	Katrin Thoma; Nora Wessel	Germany	7:32.39	Q
2	Sara Vichova; Monika Novakova	Czech Republic	7:38.08	Q
3	Hikari Nakagawa; Ayami Oishi	Japan	7:40.99	R
4	Yuliia Danylkina; Hanna Slesarevska	Ukraine	8:03.85	R
5	Guadalupe Garcia; Analicia Ramirez	Mexico	BUW	R

=== Repechage ===
Rank	Rower	Country	Time	Notes
1	Kim Sol-ji; Park Yeon-hee	South Korea	8:27.77	Q
2	Hikari Nakagawa; Ayami Oishi	Japan	8:28.25	Q
3	Charlotte Culty; Camille Leclerc	France	8:28.95	FB
4	Stine Hammer; Kari Ælveborn	Norway	8:39.24	FB
5	Guadalupe Garcia; Analicia Ramirez	Mexico	8:48.44	FB
6	Yuliia Danylkina; Hanna Slesarevska	Ukraine	9:08.55	FB
