= 2024 World Rowing Championships – Women's lightweight single sculls =

Women's lightweight single sculls at the 2024 World Rowing Championships
- Venue: Royal Canadian Henley Rowing Course
- Location: St. Catharines, Canada
- Dates: 19–24 August
- Competitors: 22 from 22 nations

Medalists
gold medal	Ionela Livia Cozmiuc	Romania
silver medal	Zoi Fitsiou	Greece
bronze medal	Siobhan McCrohan	Ireland

The women's lightweight single sculls competition at the 2024 World Rowing Championships took place in St. Catharines between 19 and 24 August 2024.

== Schedule ==
The schedule was as follows:

Date	Time	Round
Monday 19 August 2024	10:37	Heats
Tuesday 20 August 2024	10:14	Repechages
Thursday 22 August 2024	11:39	Semifinals C/D
Friday 23 August 2024	10:59	Semifinals A/B
Saturday 24 August 2024	09:52	Final D
Saturday 24 August 2024	11:02	Final C
Saturday 24 August 2024	11:12	Final B
Saturday 24 August 2024	14:43	Final A

All times are Eastern Daylight Time (UTC-4)

== Results ==
=== Heats ===
The fastest boat in each heat advanced directly to the semifinals. The remaining boats were sent to the repechages.

==== Heat 1 ====
Rank	Rower	Country	Time	Notes
1	Lara Tiefenthaler	Austria	8:28.72	SAB
2	Aurélie Morizot	France	8:32.45	R
3	Olivia Bates	Great Britain	8:34.05	R
4	Nadia Gaspari	South Africa	8:54.45	R
5	Nuntida Krajangjam	Thailand	8:56.31	R
6	Dorottya Bene	Hungary	9:18.57	R

==== Heat 2 ====
Rank	Rower	Country	Time	Notes
1	Zoi Fitsiou	Greece	8:26.33	SAB
2	Eline Rol	Switzerland	8:31.67	R
3	Audrianna Boersen	United States	8:43.63	R
4	Ines Oliveira	Portugal	8:51.18	R
5	Marion Reichardt	Germany	8:56.54	R
6	Chika Yonezawa	Japan	8:57.77	R

==== Heat 3 ====
Rank	Rower	Country	Time	Notes
1	Siobhán McCrohan	Ireland	8:23.03	SAB
2	Kenia Lechuga	Mexico	8:28.74	R
3	Martyna Radosz	Poland	8:32.33	R
4	Khadija Krimi	Tunisia	8:34.92	R
5	Karissa Riley	Canada	8:36.83	R

==== Heat 4 ====
Rank	Rower	Country	Time	Notes
1	Ionela-Livia Lehaci	Romania	8:26.80	SAB
2	Maia Emilie Lund	Norway	8:37.14	R
3	Silvia Crosio	Italy	8:38.75	R
4	Leung Wing Wun	Hong Kong	8:48.48	R

=== Repechages ===
The two fastest boats in repechage advanced to Semifinal A/B. The remaining boats were sent to Semifinal C/D.

==== Repechage 1 ====
Rank	Rower	Country	Time	Notes
1	Aurélie Morizot	France	8:20.33	SAB
2	Audrianna Boersen	United States	8:21.50	SAB
3	Khadija Krimi	Tunisia	8:22.37	SCD
4	Dorottya Bene	Hungary	8:59.79	SCD

==== Repechage 2 ====
Rank	Rower	Country	Time	Notes
1	Eline Rol	Switzerland	8:25.14	SAB
2	Martyna Radosz	Poland	8:31.15	SAB
3	Chika Yonezawa	Japan	8:36.34	SCD
4	Leung Wing Wun	Hong Kong	8:44.09	SCD
5	Nuntida Krajangjam	Thailand	8:51.33	SCD

==== Repechage 3 ====
Rank	Rower	Country	Time	Notes
1	Kenia Lechuga	Mexico	8:24.02	SAB
2	Marion Reichardt	Germany	8:27.39	SAB
3	Nadia Gaspari	South Africa	8:29.54	SCD
4	Silvia Crosio	Italy	8:45.19	

==== Repechage 4 ====
Rank	Rower	Country	Time	Notes
1	Olivia Bates	Great Britain	8:22.34	SAB
2	Maia Emilie Lund	Norway	8:23.12	SAB
3	Karissa Riley	Canada	8:24.84	SCD
4	Ines Oliveira	Portugal	8:42.11	SCD

=== Semifinals C/D ===
The three fastest boats in each semifinal advanced to the C final. The remaining boats were sent to the D final.

==== Semifinal 1 ====
Rank	Rower	Country	Time	Notes
1	Karissa Riley	Canada	7:56.99	FC
2	Khadija Krimi	Tunisia	8:02.19	FC
3	Leung Wing Wun	Hong Kong	8:08.11	FC
4	Dorottya Bene	Hungary	8:15.50	FD

==== Semifinal 2 ====
Rank	Rower	Country	Time	Notes
1	Nadia Gaspari	South Africa	7:55.62	FC
2	Chika Yonezawa	Japan	8:02.88	FC
3	Ines Oliveira	Portugal	8:08.74	FC
4	Nuntida Krajangjam	Thailand	8:14.82	FD

=== Semifinals A/B ===
The three fastest boats in each semifinal advanced to the A final. The remaining boats were sent to the B final.

==== Semifinal 1 ====
Rank	Rower	Country	Time	Notes
1	Zoi Fitsiou	Greece	7:25.37	FA
2	Kenia Lechuga	Mexico	7:30.66	FA
3	Lara Tiefenthaler	Austria	7:33.27	FA
4	Martyna Radosz	Poland	7:33.97	FB
5	Olivia Bates	Great Britain	7:38.83	FB
6	Audrianna Boersen	United States	7:40.53	FB

==== Semifinal 2 ====
Rank	Rower	Country	Time	Notes
1	Ionela-Livia Lehaci	Romania	7:25.56	FA
2	Siobhán McCrohan	Ireland	7:34.04	FA
3	Aurélie Morizot	France	7:38.08	FA
4	Maia Emilie Lund	Norway	7:43.57	FB
5	Marion Reichardt	Germany	7:45.21	FB
6	Eline Rol	Switzerland	7:50.37	FB

=== Finals ===
==== Final D ====
Final D took place at 09:52 on 24 August.

Rank	Rower	Country	Time	Notes
1	Dorottya Bene	Hungary	7:52.88	
2	Nuntida Krajangjam	Thailand	7:54.53	

==== Final C ====
Final C took place at 11:02 on 24 August.

Rank	Rower	Country	Time	Notes
1	Karissa Riley	Canada	7:37.73	
2	Nadia Gaspari	South Africa	7:40.04	
3	Khadija Krimi	Tunisia	7:42.13	
4	Chika Yonezawa	Japan	7:45.44	
5	Wing Wun Leung	Hong Kong	7:52.18	
6	Ines Oliveira	Portugal	8:00.89	

==== Final B ====
Final B took place at 11:12 on 24 August.

Rank	Rower	Country	Time	Notes
1	Martyna Radosz	Poland	7:33.48	
2	Audrianna Boersen	United States	7:33.75	
3	Olivia Bates	United Kingdom	7:36.11	
4	Maia Emilie Lund	Norway	7:37.84	
5	Marion Reichardt	Germany	7:38.75	
6	Eline Rol	Switzerland	7:40.48	

==== Final A ====
Final A took place at 14:43 on 24 August.

Rank	Rower	Country	Time	Notes
1st place, gold medalist(s)	Ionela Livia Cozmiuc	Romania	7:29.92	
2nd place, silver medalist(s)	Zoi Fitsiou	Greece	7:31.65	
3rd place, bronze medalist(s)	Siobhan McCrohan	Ireland	7:32.94	
4	Kenia Lechuga	Mexico	7:41.40	
5	Aurelie Morizot	France	7:41.86	
6	Lara Tiefenthaler	Austria	7:51.54	
