= Indonesia at the 2022 World Rowing Championships =

- Flag of Indonesia
- FINA code: INA
- National federation: Indonesia Rowing Federation

in Račice, Czech Republic
- Competitors: 10 (8 men and 2 women)
- Medals: Gold 0 Silver 0 Bronze 0 Total 0

World Rowing Championships appearances
- 2022

Indonesia competed at the 2022 World Rowing Championships in Račice, Czech Republic from 18 to 25 September.

== Results ==
=== Men ===
Athlete	Event	Heat		Repechage		Semifinal		Final		
Athlete	Event	Time	Rank	Time	Rank	Time	Rank	Time	Rank	Total Rank
Ihram; Sulpianto; Rendi Setia Maulana; La Memo	Quadruple sculls	6:14.94	6 R	6:00.94	6 FC	—		5:58.63	5	17 (from 17 team)
Ali Buton; Ferdiansyah; Denri Maulidzar Al Ghifari; Ardi Isadi	Coxless four	6:29.55	5 R	6:05.28	5 SC/D	6:21.16	3 FD	BUW	2	19 (from 19 team)

=== Women ===
Athlete	Event	Heat		Repechage		Semifinal		Final		
Athlete	Event	Time	Rank	Time	Rank	Time	Rank	Time	Rank	Total Rank
Chelsea Corputty; Mutiara Rahma Putri	Lightweight double sculls	7:35.55	5 R	7:40.99	5 SC/D	7:43.56	5 FD	7:30.99	2	20 (from 24 team)
