= Kontou =

Kontou is a surname. Notable people with the surname include:

- Dimitra Kontou (born 2005), Greek rower
- Marianthi Kontou (1934–2026), Greek actress and politician
