= Indoor rowing at the 2017 World Games – Women's Lightweight 2000 metres =

Women's Lightweight 2000 metres at the 2017 World Games
- Venue: Multifunctional Hall
- Location: Jelcz-Laskowice, Poland
- Dates: 26 July
- Competitors: 10 from 10 nations

Medalists
| gold medal | Anna Berger | Austria |
| silver medal | Justine Reston | Great Britain |
| bronze medal | Phuttharaksa Neegree | Thailand |

The women's lightweight 2000 metres event in indoor rowing at the 2017 World Games took place on the 26 July 2017 at the Multifunctional Hall in Jelcz-Laskowice.

== Results ==
GR = Games Record

| Rank | Athlete | NOC | Time | Notes |
|---|---|---|---|---|
| 1st place, gold medalist(s) | Anna Berger | Austria | 7:12.7 | GR |
| 2nd place, silver medalist(s) | Justine Reston | Great Britain | 7:15.3 | |
| 3rd place, bronze medalist(s) | Phuttharaksa Neegree | Thailand | 7:19.5 | |
| 4 | Christina Gandia | Spain | 7:30.8 | |
| 5 | Hyewon Jung | South Korea | 7:32.7 | |
| 6 | Ludmila Ivanova | Latvia | 7:58.7 | |
| 7 | Kristina Bjorknas | Finland | 8:10.3 | |
| 8 | Michelle Vella Wood | Malta | 8:12.4 | |
| 9 | Naoko Fujita | Japan | 8:21.9 | |
| - | Betty Nabifo Belinda | Uganda | DNS | |
