= Shannon Cox (rower) =

New Zealand rower (born 1998)

Personal information
- Born: 4 June 1998 (age 28) Whangārei, New Zealand
- Height: 168 cm (5 ft 6 in)

Sport
- Country: New Zealand
- Sport: Rowing
- Event: Lightweight double sculls

Shannon Cox (born 4 June 1998) is a rower from New Zealand. She competed at the 2024 Paris Olympics.

== Early life ==
She started rowing at Whangārei Girls' High School in 2012.

== Career ==
A member of Avon Rowing Club in Christchurch, she made her debut in a New Zealand vest when she won three gold medals at the Trans Tasman Under 21 regatta in Sydney in 2018, winning the lightweight sculls, the quad and the eight.

She was selected to represent New Zealand at the World Rowing U23 Championships in Sarasota, Florida in 2019, to compete in the women's under-23 lightweight single scull. She won the New Zealand Women's Single Sculls title in 2022.

She competed at the 2023 World Rowing Championships in the Women's lightweight double sculls alongside Jackie Kiddle where their performance qualified their boat class for the 2024 Olympics. She won the World Cup III in Poznań in June 2024, in the lightweight double sculls with Kiddle.

She competed in the lightweight double sculls alongside Kiddle at the 2024 Paris Olympics.
