= Maria Botalova =

Russian rower

Personal information
- Nationality: Russian
- Born: 8 October 1990 (age 34)

Sport
- Sport: Rowing

Maria Botalova (born 8 October 1990) is a Russian rower. She competed in the women's lightweight double sculls event at the 2020 Summer Olympics.
