= Marieke Keijser =

Dutch rower (born 1997)

Personal information
- Nationality: Dutch
- Born: 21 January 1997 (age 29) Rotterdam, Netherlands

Sport
- Country: Netherlands
- Sport: Rowing
- Events: Lightweight single sculls, Lightweight double sculls
- Club: A.R.S.R. Skadi
Medal record
Women's rowing
Representing the Netherlands
Olympic Games
Bronze medal – third place	2020 Tokyo	Lwt double sculls
World Championships
Gold medal – first place	2026 Amsterdam	Quadruple sculls
Silver medal – second place	2017 Sarasota	Lwt single sculls
Silver medal – second place	2019 Ottensheim	Lwt double sculls
Bronze medal – third place	2018 Plovdiv	Lwt double sculls
European Championships
Gold medal – first place	2018 Glasgow	Lwt double sculls
Silver medal – second place	2017 Račice	Lwt double sculls
Bronze medal – third place	2019 Lucerne	Lwt single sculls

Marieke Keijser (born 21 January 1997) is a Dutch representative rower. She is an Olympian and won the silver medal in the lightweight single sculls at the 2017 World Rowing Championships and the gold medal at the 2018 European Rowing Championships. She is racing the Dutch lightweight women's double scull with Ilse Paulis at Tokyo 2021.

== Junior career ==
When she was young she was a ballerina and was accepted for a year at the Royal Dutch Conservatorium. She played field hockey for a while. She started rowing at aged 11, following after her brother. By age 19, Keijser had competed at three World Rowing Junior Championships. In the women's single scull she won a bronze medal in 2014 and then a gold medal a Junior World Championship title in 2015.
