= Ilse Paulis =

Dutch rower (born 1993)

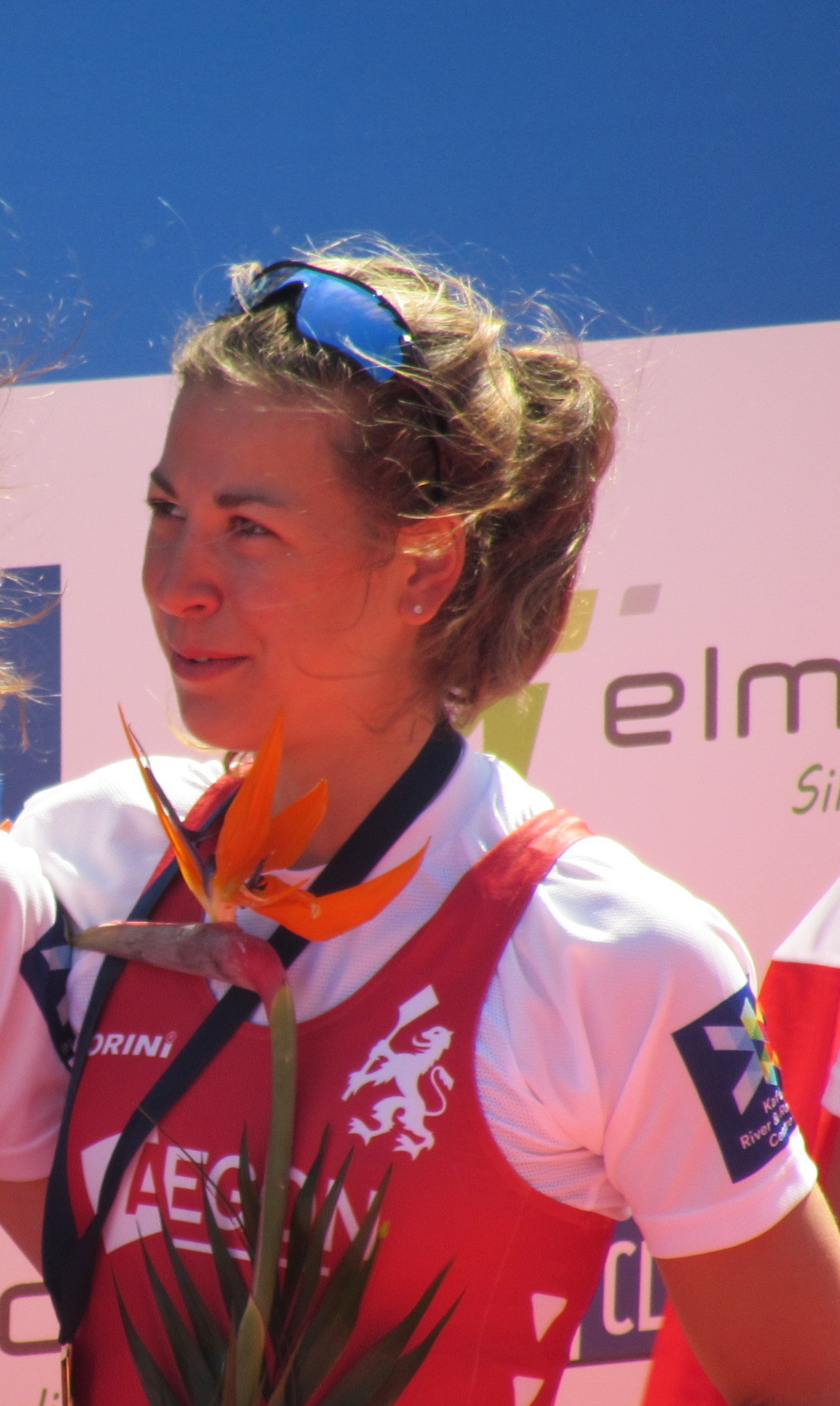
- Paulis in 2016

Personal information
- Nationality: Dutch
- Born: 30 July 1993 (age 32) Leiderdorp, Netherlands
- Height: 1.73 m (5 ft 8 in)
- Weight: 62 kg (137 lb)

Sport
- Country: Netherlands
- Sport: Rowing
- Event(s): Lightweight double sculls, Lightweight quadruple sculls
Medal record
Women's rowing
Representing the Netherlands
Olympic Games
Gold medal – first place	2016 Rio de Janeiro	Lwt double sculls
Bronze medal – third place	2020 Tokyo	Lwt double sculls
World Championships
Gold medal – first place	2014 Amsterdam	Lwt quad sculls
Silver medal – second place	2019 Ottensheim	Lwt double sculls
Bronze medal – third place	2018 Plovdiv	Lwt double sculls
European Championships
Gold medal – first place	2016 Brandenburg	Lwt double sculls
Gold medal – first place	2018 Glasgow	Lwt double sculls
Silver medal – second place	2017 Račice	Lwt double sculls

Ilse Paulis (born 30 July 1993) is a Dutch representative rower. She is a world champion, a dual Olympian, an Olympic gold medallist and has set three world's best times, one of which is a standing world record as of 2026. She raced the lightweight women's double scull with Marieke Keijser at Tokyo 2021.

== Club and education ==
Paulis rowed collegiately for the Ohio State Buckeyes.

Together with Maaike Head, Paulis won the gold medal in the lightweight double sculls at the 2016 Summer Olympics.

For the 2026 World Rowing Championships in Amsterdam, Paulis was appointed Regatta Director in a joint role together with former Olympic champion Nico Rienks.

== World record holder ==
At the 2014 World Rowing Championships in Amsterdam, in the final of women's lightweight quad scull Paulis, Mirte Kraaijkamp, Elisabeth Woerner and Maaike Head rowed a world's best time of 6:15.95 a mark which has not been beaten as of 2021.

In 2016 at the World Rowing Cup III in Poznan, Paulis and Head set a new world's best time of 6:47.69 in a lightweight double scull. This record stood until June 2021 when Paulis, now rowing with Marieke Keijser clocked 6:43.79 in the final at WRC III in Sabaudia, Italy.

== Personal life ==
Both her younger sisters are rowers too. Bente Paulis was the silver medallist at the 2024 Summer Olympics in the quadruple sculls. Their youngest sister Femke has competed in three junior world championships.
