= Gianina van Groningen =

Romanian rower (born 1995)

Gianina Elena van Groningen
Personal information
- Full name: Gianina Elena van Groningen
- Nationality: Romanian
- Born: Gianina Elena Beleagă; 21 May 1995 (age 31) Gura Humorului, Romania
- Height: 177 cm (5 ft 10 in)
- Weight: 62 kg (137 lb)

Sport
- Country: Romania
- Sport: Rowing
Medal record
Women's rowing
Representing Romania
Olympic Games
Silver medal – second place	2024 Paris	Lwt double sculls
World Championships
Gold medal – first place	2018 Plovdiv	Lwt double sculls
Gold medal – first place	2017 Sarasota	Lwt double sculls
European Championships
Gold medal – first place	2024 Szeged	Lwt double sculls
Silver medal – second place	2021 Varese	Lwt single sculls
Bronze medal – third place	2020 Poznań	Lwt double sculls

Gianina Elena van Groningen (née Beleagă; born 21 May 1995) is a Romanian rower. She is twice world champion in the women's lightweight double sculls event winning back-to-back titles in 2017 and 2018 for Romania. She competed in the women's lightweight double sculls event at the 2016, 2020, and 2024 Summer Olympics, where she won a silver medal paired with Ionela Cozmiuc.

In 2023, she married Jan-Wessel van Groningen, son of former Olympic rowers Steven van Groningen and Valeria Răcilă.
