= Jennieffer Zúñiga =

Guatemalan rower (born 1987)

Personal information
- Born: 13 March 1987 (age 38) Amatitlán, Guatemala

Sport
- Sport: Rowing

Jennieffer Zúñiga (born 13 March 1987) is a Guatemalan rower. She competed in the women's lightweight double sculls event at the 2020 Summer Olympics.
