= Evelyn Silvestro =

Argentine rower (born 1999)

Personal information
- Full name: Evelyn Maricel Silvestro
- Born: 1 March 1999 (age 27) Zárate, Argentina

Sport
- Country: Argentina
- Sport: Rowing
- Club: Club Nautico Zarate
Medal record
Pan American Games
Bronze medal – third place	2023 Santiago	Lightweight double sculls

Evelyn Maricel Silvestro (born 1 March 1999) is an Argentine rower. She competed in the women's lightweight double sculls event at the 2020 Summer Olympics.
