= Zoe McBride =

New Zealand rower

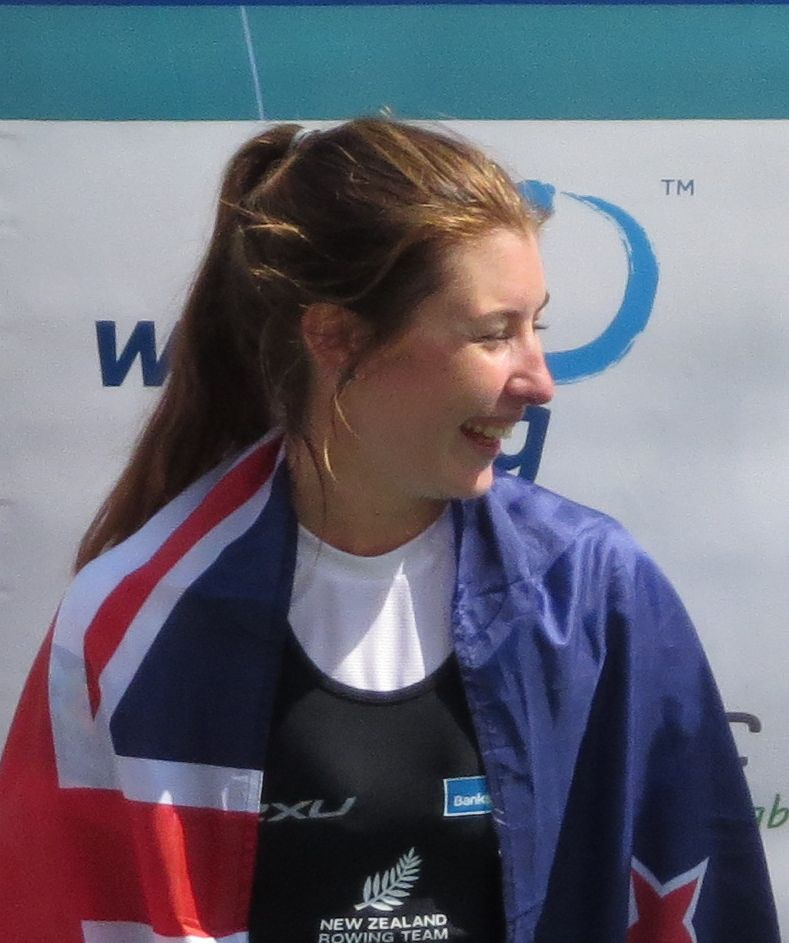
- McBride in 2015

Personal information
- Nationality: New Zealand
- Born: 27 September 1995 (age 31) Nelson, New Zealand
- Height: 1.70 m (5 ft 7 in)
- Weight: 61 kg (134 lb)

Sport
- Country: New Zealand
- Sport: Rowing
- Events: Lightweight single sculls, Lightweight double sculls
- Club: Nelson
Medal record
Women's rowing
Representing New Zealand
World Championships
Gold medal – first place	2015 Aiguebelette	Lwt single sculls
Gold medal – first place	2016 Rotterdam	Lwt single sculls
Gold medal – first place	2019 Ottensheim	Lwt double sculls
Silver medal – second place	2017 Sarasota	Lwt double sculls
World Championships (U23)
Gold medal – first place	2014 Varese	Lwt double sculls
Gold medal – first place	2015 Plovdiv	Lwt double sculls
World Championships (junior)
Bronze medal – third place	2012 Plovdiv	Quadruple sculls

Zoe McBride (born 27 September 1995) is a former New Zealand rower. She is a double world champion in the women's lightweight single scull. She is only the second New Zealand rower to win a double national championship in both the lightweight and premier single sculls.

== Early life and education ==
McBride was born in 1995 in Nelson, where she attended St Joseph's School. She and her family moved to Dunedin when she was 13, where her father Dene McBride works at Port Otago Ltd. She attended Kavanagh College from where she graduated in 2013, and spent two months attending St Peter's School in Cambridge in order to train at Lake Karapiro. She lives in Cambridge and is a part-time student at Massey University.

== Rowing ==
McBride took up rowing in 2009. She was an outstanding competitor in the Maadi Cup, the annual New Zealand secondary schools rowing regatta, where she won three gold medals each in 2011 and 2012, and four gold medals in 2013. McBride first represented New Zealand at the World Rowing Junior Championships in 2012 in Plovdiv, Bulgaria, where she gained a bronze medal with the quadruple sculls (with Nathalie Hill, Ruby Tew, and Hannah Osborne). She trained at Lake Karapiro and then represented New Zealand at the World Rowing Junior Championships in 2013 in Trakai, Lithuania. She competed in the junior women's quad scull and the team came fifth in the final. She represented New Zealand at the World Rowing U23 Championships in 2014 in Varese, Italy, in the lightweight double sculls with Sophie MacKenzie, where they won gold.

For the 2014 year, McBride was a finalist in the Halberg Awards in the 'Emerging Talent Award' category.

At the second regatta of the 2015 World Rowing Cup held in Varese, McBride broke Constanța Burcică's 1994 world best time by over 3.5 seconds in the semi-final of the lightweight single scull. McBride won the final, beating Brazil's Fabiana Beltrame. At the World Rowing U23 Championships in 2015 in Plovdiv, Bulgaria, she won the U23 lightweight double scull with Jackie Kiddle, setting a new world best time. McBride won a gold medal at the 2015 World Rowing Championships in the lightweight single scull and repeated the feat at the 2016 World Rowing Championships. She is a member of the Nelson Rowing Club.

At the 2017 New Zealand rowing nationals at Lake Ruataniwha, she became national champion in both the lightweight and premier open single sculls. She is the second New Zealand rower to achieve this feat, with the previous double taken by Philippa Baker in the 1987–88 season. At the 2017 World Rowing Championships in Sarasota, Florida, she won a silver medal in the lightweight double sculls partnered with Jackie Kiddle. At the 2018 World Rowing Championships in Plovdiv, Bulgaria, McBride and Kiddle came sixth in the lightweight double sculls.

In March 2021, McBride announced her retirement. McBride later revealed she had been struggling with relative energy deficiency in sport (RED-S) while trying to keep under the 57 kg (126 lb) lightweight standard.
