= Anastasia Lebedeva =

Russian rower

Personal information
- Nationality: Russian
- Born: 20 May 1993 (age 31); Moscow, Russia

Sport
- Sport: Rowing

Anastasia Lebedeva (born 20 May 1993) is a Russian rower. She competed in the women's lightweight double sculls event at the 2020 Summer Olympics.
