= Martyna Radosz =

Polish rower (born 1991)

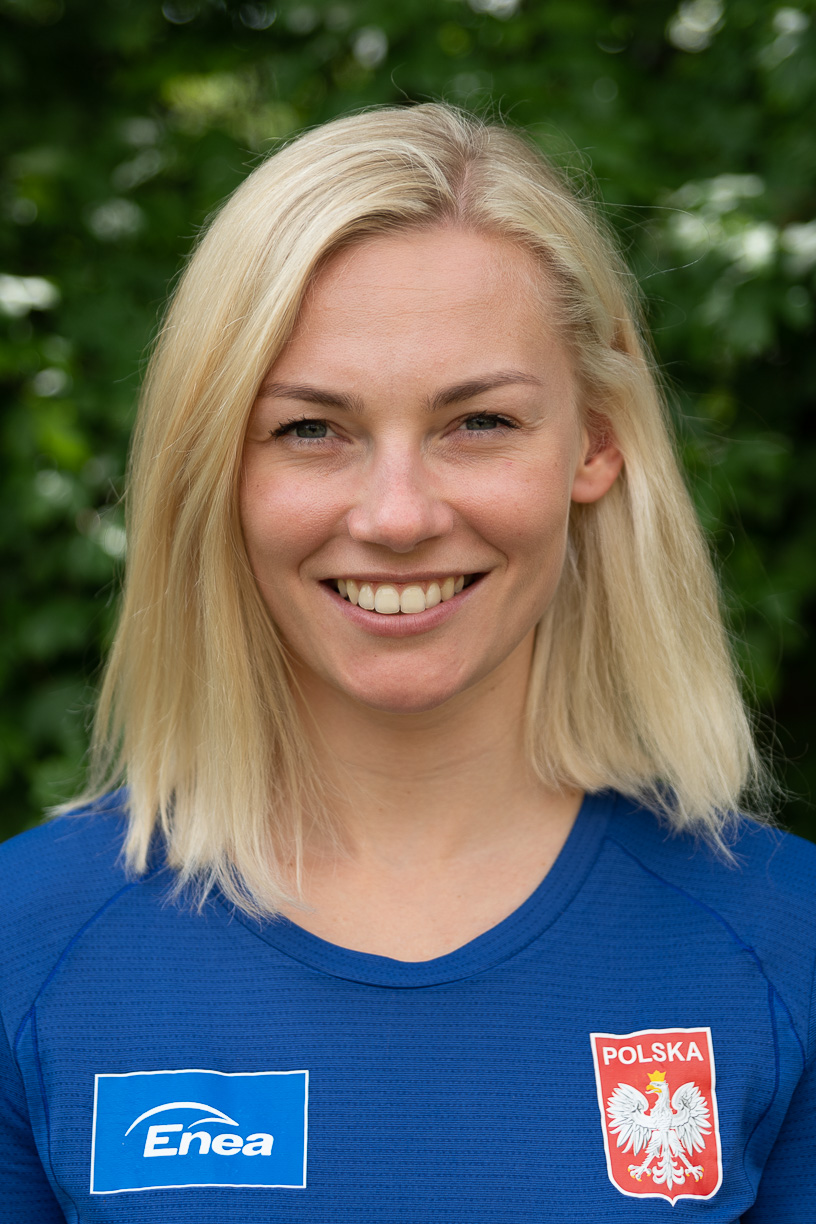

Personal information
- Born: 12 May 1991 (age 35) Bydgoszcz

Sport
- Club: LOTTO-Bydgostia
Medal record
Women's rowing
Representing Poland
European Championships
Gold medal – first place	2017 Račice	LW2x

Martyna Radosz née Mikołajczak (born 12 May 1991 in Bydgoszcz) is a Polish rower, European champion in 2017 in lightweight double sculls, silver medalist at the 2015 Summer Universiade, and world university champion (2014). At the 2016 Summer Olympics in Rio de Janeiro, she finished 7th in lightweight double sculls.

== Sports career ==
She is a member of LOTTO-Bydgostia Bydgoszcz. From 2007 to 2010, she attended the VIII High School in Bydgoszcz, in a sports class with a rowing profile.

Her greatest career successes include winning the world university championship in 2014 in lightweight double sculls (with Monika Kowalska) and the silver medal at the 2015 Summer Universiade in the same event (also with Monika Kowalska). She represented Poland at the 2015 World Championships, finishing 3rd in the C final in lightweight single sculls, and at the 2016 European Championships, finishing 5th in the same event, as well as at the 2016 Summer Olympics, finishing 7th (1st in the B final) in lightweight double sculls (with Weronika Deresz).

At the 2014 Polish Championships, she won gold medals in lightweight single sculls and lightweight quadruple sculls and a bronze medal in lightweight double sculls, and in 2015, she won a silver medal in lightweight double sculls and a bronze medal in lightweight quadruple sculls.

On 19 December 2016, she, along with Miłosz Jankowski, set a world record in the 100 km rowing ergometer mixed pair age group 20–29, with a time of 6 hours 15 minutes 6.5 seconds.

== World Cup ==
- 1st place (Belgrade 2017)
- 2nd place (Bled 2015, Poznań 2017, Lucerne 2017)

== Results ==
Year	Event	Venue	Competition	Time	Position
2015	World Championships	FRA Lac d’Aiguebelette	Lightweight single sculls	C Final: 8:09.48	15th place
2016	European Championships	DEU Brandenburg	Lightweight single sculls	A Final: 8:49.70	5th place
2016	Olympic Games	BRA Rio de Janeiro	Lightweight double sculls	B Final: 7:24.34	7th place
2017	European Championships	CZE Račice	Lightweight double sculls	A Final: 6:58.55	1st place
2017	World Championships	USA Sarasota	Lightweight double sculls	B Final: 8:00.30	9th place
2018	European Championships	GBR Glasgow	Double sculls	A Final: 7:05.42	6th place
2018	World Championships	BGR Plovdiv	Double sculls	B Final: 6:51.97	8th place
2019	European Championships	CHE Lucerne	Double sculls	B Final: 7:10.50	12th place
2019	World Championships	AUT Ottensheim	Double sculls	C Final: 7:00.05	13th place
