= Anneka Reardon =

Australian rower

Personal information
- Nationality: Australian
- Born: 4 September 1997 (age 28)
- Home town: New Norfolk, Tasmania, Australia
- Height: 168 cm (5 ft 6 in)

Sport
- Country: Australia
- Sport: Rowing
- Club: Australian National University Boat Club
- Coached by: Ellen Randell
Medal record
Women's rowing
Representing Australia
World Cup 2
| Silver medal – second place | 2022 Poznań | Lwt W2x |

Anneka Reardon (born 4 September 1997) is an Australian representative lightweight rower. She is a five time Australian national champion and has represented at senior World Championships.

== Club and state rowing ==
Reardon was raised in Tasmania and first coached in sculling by her father Mick. Her senior club rowing was from the Lindisfarne Rowing Club and the Sandy Bay Rowing Club in Hobart. After making Australian representative squads she has rowed from the Australian National University Boat Club.

She first made state selection for Tasmania in the 2017 women's youth eight which contested the Bicentennial Cup at the Interstate Regatta within the Australian Rowing Championships. In 2019 she moved into the Tasmanian women's lightweight quad scull which contested and won the Victoria Cup at the Interstate Regatta. She represented again in successful Tasmanian Victoria Cup quads in 2021 and 2022 and then in 2023 for a second placing.

In 2021 in ANU colours she won the open lightweight women's quad scull title at the Australian Rowing Championships and placed third in the open lightweight single scull. At the 2023 Australian Rowing Championships she won the open lightweight quad scull national title in a composite crew.

== International representative rowing ==
Reardon was selected in the Australian senior training team to prepare for the 2022 international season and the 2022 World Rowing Championships. She rowed Australia's lightweight double scull with Lucy Coleman at the World Rowing Cup II in June 2022 to a silver medal. At the 2022 World Rowing Championships at Racize, she again raced the lightweight double with Coleman. They finished fourth in the B final for an overall tenth-place finish at the regatta.

In March 2023 Reardon was again selected as a sculler in the Australian women's lightweight squad for the 2023 international season. At the Rowing World Cup II in Varese, Italy Reardon raced as Australia's WLW2X entrant with Lucy Coleman. They made the B final and finished in overall ninth place. At 2023's RWC III in Lucerne, Reardon and Coleman again raced the WLW2X finishing in overall tenth place. Reardon and Coleman were selected to race Australia's lightweight coxless pair at 2023 World Rowing Championships in Belgrade, Serbia. They placed third in their heat and ultimately won the C final for an overall 13th place at the regatta.
