= Imogen Grant =

British rower

Doctor Imogen Grant MBE
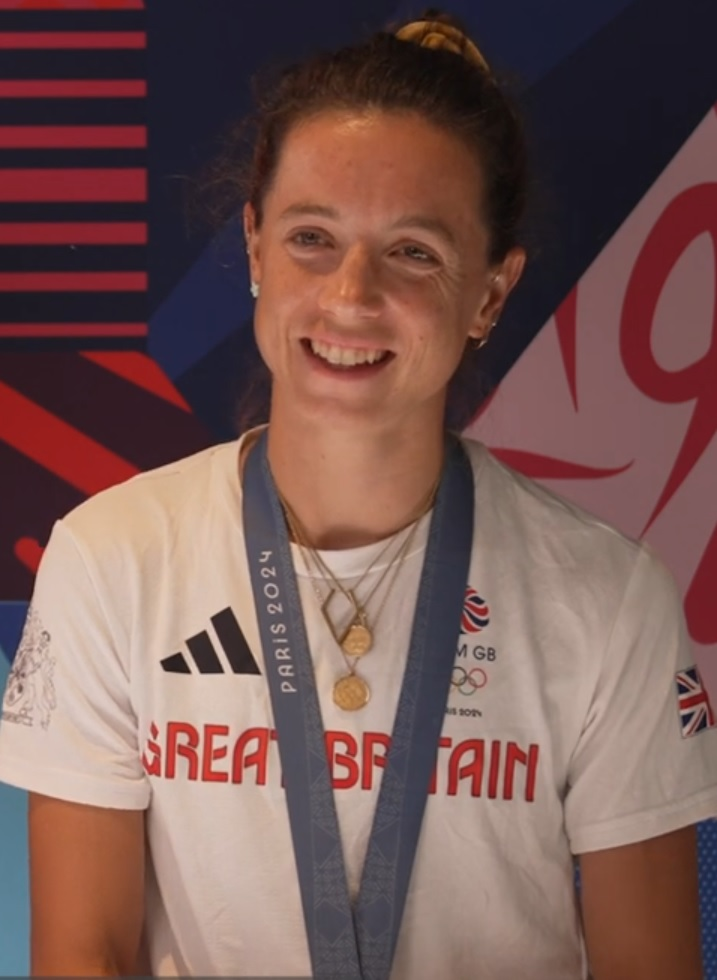
- Grant at the 2024 Summer Olympics

Personal information
- Full name: Imogen Daisy Grant
- Nationality: English
- Born: 26 February 1996 (age 30) Cambridge, England
- Education: Trinity College, Cambridge
- Height: 1.68 m (5 ft 6 in)

Sport
- Country: Great Britain
- Sport: Rowing
- Event: Lightweight double sculls
Medal record
Women's rowing
Representing Great Britain
Olympic Games
Gold medal – first place	2024 Paris	Lwt double sculls
World Championships
Gold medal – first place	2023 Belgrade	Lwt double sculls
Gold medal – first place	2022 Račice	Lwt double sculls
Silver medal – second place	2026 Amsterdam	Quadruple sculls
Bronze medal – third place	2019 Ottensheim	Lwt double sculls
Bronze medal – third place	2018 Plovdiv	Lwt single sculls
European Championships
Gold medal – first place	2023 Bled	Lwt double sculls
Gold medal – first place	2022 Oberschleißheim	Lwt double sculls
Silver medal – second place	2021 Varese	Lwt double sculls
U23 World Championships
Gold medal – first place	2018 Poznań	Lwt single sculls
World Cups
Gold medal – first place	2024 World Cup II	Lwt double sculls
Gold medal – first place	2024 World Cup I	Lwt double sculls
Gold medal – first place	2023 World Cup III	Lwt double sculls
Gold medal – first place	2023 World Cup II	Lwt double sculls
Gold medal – first place	2022 World Cup III	Lwt double sculls
Gold medal – first place	2021 World Cup II	Lwt double sculls
Gold medal – first place	2018 World Cup III	Lwt single sculls

Imogen Daisy Grant (born 26 February 1996) is a British lightweight Olympic, World, and European rower.

== Early life ==
Grant was brought up in Bar Hill, Cambridge, where she attended The Perse School for Girls before studying medicine at Trinity College, Cambridge.

== Rowing ==
Grant won a bronze medal at the 2018 World Rowing Championships in Plovdiv, Bulgaria, in the lightweight single sculls and the following year she won another bronze medal at the 2019 World Rowing Championships in Ottensheim, Austria but this time as part of the lightweight double sculls with Emily Craig.

In 2021, she won a European silver medal in the lightweight double sculls in Varese, Italy.

With the Cambridge squad, she won the 2022 Oxford–Cambridge University Boat Race.

At the 2022 World Cup III regatta in Lucerne, Switzerland, she won gold and set a new world's best time in women's lightweight singles of 7:23.36.

She won a gold medal in the Lightweight Double Sculls at the 2022 European Rowing Championships and the 2022 World Rowing Championships.

At the 2023 World Rowing Championships in Belgrade, she won the World Championship gold medal in the women's lightweight double sculls with Emily Craig.

=== Olympic gold medal ===
At the 2024 Summer Olympics Grant and Emily Craig won the gold medal in the women's lightweight double sculls, the final time that the event was held at the Olympic Games.

=== MBE ===
She was awarded an MBE in the 2025 New Year Honours for services to rowing.

== Other career ==
Grant has a degree in Physiology, Development and Neuroscience and Medicine, and master's degree in Obstetrics and Gynaecology from the University of Cambridge. She started a career as a medical doctor in August 2024.

== Personal life ==
Grant became a vegan in 2022.
