= Margaret Cremen =

Irish rower (born 1999)

Personal information
- Born: 5 January 1999 (age 27) Cork, Ireland

Sport
- Sport: Rowing
Medal record
Women's rowing
Representing Ireland
World Championships
Gold medal – first place	2025 Shanghai	Mixed double sculls
Gold medal – first place	2026 Amsterdam	Double sculls
Silver medal – second place	2026 Amsterdam	Mixed double sculls
Bronze medal – third place	2022 Račice	Lwt double sculls
European Championships
Silver medal – second place	2024 Szeged	Lwt single sculls

Margaret Cremen (born 5 January 1999) is an Irish rower. She competed in the women's lightweight double sculls event at the 2020 Summer Olympics.
