= Chiaki Tomita =

Japanese rower (born 1993)

Personal information
- Nationality: Japanese
- Born: 18 October 1993 (age 33) Yonago, Japan
- Height: 1.65 m (5 ft 5 in)
- Weight: 55 kg (121 lb)

Sport
- Country: Japan
- Sport: Rowing
Medal record
Women's rowing
Representing Japan
World Championships
Silver medal – second place	2019 Ottensheim	Lwt single sculls
Asian Games
Silver medal – second place	2022 Hangzhou	Eight

Chiaki Tomita (冨田 千愛, Tomita Chiaki, born 18 October 1993) is a Japanese rower. She competed in the women's lightweight double sculls event at the 2016 Summer Olympics.
