= Michelle Sechser =

American rower (born 1986)

Personal information
- Nationality: American
- Born: November 1, 1986 (age 39) San Luis Obispo, California, U.S.
- Height: 1.66 m (5 ft 5 in)
- Weight: 57 kg (126 lb)

Sport
- Sport: Rowing
- College team: Tulsa Golden Hurricane

Achievements and titles
- Olympic finals: 2020 Summer Olympics LW2x 2024 Summer Olympics LW2x
Medal record
Women's rowing
Representing the United States
World Championships
Gold medal – first place	2025 Shanghai	Lwt single sculls
Silver medal – second place	2017 Sarasota	Lwt double sculls
Silver medal – second place	2022 Račice	Lwt double sculls
Silver medal – second place	2023 Belgrade	Lwt double sculls

Michelle Sechser (/ˈsɛksər/ SEK-sər; born November 1, 1986) is an American rower. She competed in the women's lightweight double sculls event at the 2020 Summer Olympics. She competed at the 2024 Summer Olympics in the women's lightweight double sculls event.

She won the bronze medal in both the women's lightweight double sculls and women's quadruple sculls events at the 2011 Pan American Games held in Guadalajara, Mexico. She competed in the LW4x at the 2012 World Rowing Championships, the LW1x at the 2013 World Rowing Championships, and the LW2x at the 2014 and 2015 World Rowing Championships. In 2015, Sechser won a bronze medal at World Cup II in the LW2x in Lucerne, Switzerland before competing in the World Rowing Champions in Aiguebelette, France.

Sechser went on to win a bronze medal at the 2017 World Rowing Championships in the LW2x in Sarasota, Florida. She competed in the LW1x in the 2018 World Rowing Championships, and the LW2x at the 2019 World Cup Poznan and World Rowing Championships. In 2021 Sechser raced and won the Final Olympic Qualification Regatta in the LW2x, earning her berth to the Olympics. She placed 5th in at the Summer Olympic Games in Tokyo, Japan in the LW2x with a time of 6:41.54.

In 2022 Sechser won a gold medal at World Cup in Poznan, Poland in the LW2x and a silver medal at the World Rowing Championships in Račice, Czech Republic. She also won the Stonor Cup W2x at the Henley Royal Regatta.

In the LW2x in 2023 Sechser won a silver medal at World Cup Varese and a silver medal at the World Rowing Championships in Belgrade, Serbia. She also won the Women's Championship 1x event at the Head of the Charles Regatta in Boston, MA and the US Rowing Fall Speed Order in 2023.

In 2024 Sechser won a bronze medal at World Cup Lucerne in the LW2x. Sechser currently holds the American record for the Concept2 Indoor lightweight women's 2000m erg (6:55.2), 6000m erg (21:47.1), and LW2x 2000m race on a World Rowing course (6:41.54)

Sechser began rowing at age 13 for Capital Crew in Gold River, CA. She attended the University of Tulsa and graduated Magna Cum Laude with a B.S. in Business Administration and a minor in Marketing. She also earned her MBA from the University of Tulsa. In 2022 she was inducted into the University of Tulsa Athletic Hall of Fame. Sechser was the US Rowing Female Athlete of the Year in 2022.
