= Zoi Fitsiou =

Greek rower (born 1995)

Personal information
- Born: 14 September 1995 (age 31) Kozani, Greece

Sport
- Country: Greece
- Sport: Rowing
- Event: Women's lightweight single sculls
Medal record
Women's rowing
Representing Greece
Olympic Games
Bronze medal – third place	2024 Paris	Lwt double sculls
World Championships
Silver medal – second place	2024 St. Catharines	Lwt single sculls
European Championships
Silver medal – second place	2025 Plovdiv	Double sculls
Silver medal – second place	2024 Szeged	LW2x
Silver medal – second place	2023 Bled	LW2x
Silver medal – second place	2022 Munich	LW1x
Mediterranean Games
Gold medal – first place	2026 Taranto	LW1x
Gold medal – first place	2026 Taranto	LMix2x

Zoi Fitsiou (born 14 September 1995) is a Greek rower. She competed at the 2024 Summer Olympics in the lightweight double sculls.

== Career ==
She won silver medal in the lightweight single sculls at the 2022 European Rowing Championships in Munich.

She was a silver medalist alongside Dimitra Kontou at the 2023 European Rowing Championships in Bled, Slovenia, in the lightweight double sculls.

The duo won a second silver lightweight double sculls medal together at the 2024 European Rowing Championships in Szeged, Hungary in April 2024.

They secured qualification to the Olympic Games at the final qualifying event in Lucerne in May 2024.

Comparing at the 2024 Summer Olympics in Paris, the duo qualified through the preliminary rounds to reach the final, and subsequently won the bronze medal.

She won the silver medal in the lightweight single sculls at the 2024 World Rowing Championships.

She won silver in the women's double sculls alongside Dimitra Kontou at the 2025 European Rowing Championships in Plovdiv.
