= Mary Reckford =

American rower (born 1992)

Molly Reckford
Personal information
- Full name: Mary Margaret Reckford
- Nationality: American
- Born: October 9, 1992 (age 33)

Sport
- Sport: Rowing
Medal record
Women's rowing
Representing the United States
World Championships
Silver medal – second place	2022 Račice	Lwt double sculls

Mary "Molly" Reckford (born October 9, 1992) is an American rower. She competed in the women's lightweight double sculls event at both the 2020 Summer Olympics in Tokyo and the 2024 Summer Olympics in Paris.

Reckford was raised in the Short Hills section of Millburn, New Jersey. She attended The Hudson School, Phillips Exeter Academy, and Dartmouth College.

She is the granddaughter of Olympian Bill Spencer, niece of Jonathan Reckford, and great-granddaughter of U.S. Representative Millicent Fenwick. She is an Episcopalian.
