= Leonie Pless =

German rower (born 1988)

Personal information
- Nationality: German
- Born: 31 December 1988 (age 37) Kassel, West Germany
- Height: 1.66 m (5 ft 5 in)
- Weight: 57 kg (126 lb)

Sport
- Country: Germany
- Sport: Rowing
- Event: Lightweight quadruple sculls
- Club: Frankfurter Rudergesellschaft 'Germania' 1869 e.V.
Medal record
World Championships
Bronze medal – third place	2019 Ottensheim	Lwt quadruple sculls

Leonie Pless (born 31 December 1988) is a German rower.

She won a medal at the 2019 World Rowing Championships.
