= Denise Walsh =

American political scientist

- Education: Bennington College; Columbia University; New School for Social Research
- Scientific career
- Fields: Political science; Gender and sexuality studies
- Workplaces: University of Virginia

Denise Walsh is an American political scientist, currently a professor of political science and women, gender and sexuality at the University of Virginia. She studies the relationship between women's rights and political inclusion and level of democracy, as well as women's advancement during periods of democratization.

== Education and early career ==
Walsh studied politics and economics at Bennington College, earning a BA in 1985. She completed an MA in political science at Columbia University in 1986, and a PhD in political science from the New School for Social Research in 2006. In 2005, she became a professor at the University of Virginia, where she was also a co-founder of the Power, Violence and Inequality Collective, which she co-directed from 2016 to 2019.

== Career ==
Walsh wrote the book Women's Rights in Democratizing States: Just Debate and Gender Justice in the Public Sphere, published in 2010. The book confirms and advances findings that democratization does not generally increase women's participation in politics, as political institutions and parties often block women's advancement during these transitions. However, by introducing a new variable regarding debate conditions, and by means of paired comparisons of particular periods of democratization in Poland, Chile, and South Africa, Walsh shows that open and inclusive conditions for debate during democratization periods can increase the state's support for advancements in women's rights and inclusion.

Walsh has published on women's representation and rights in democracies in journals like Politics & Gender, PS: Political Science & Politics, and Comparative Political Studies. She has also published articles on research ethics, and on the status of women in the discipline of political science.

Walsh is a member of the 2020-2024 editorial leadership of the American Political Science Review, which is the most selective political science journal. She was also the 2016-2017 president of the Women's Caucus for Political Science in the American Political Science Association.

She is a Faculty Fellow at the University of Notre Dame Institute of Advance Studies for 2020–2021.

== Selected works ==
- Women's Rights in Democratizing States: Just Debate and Gender Justice in the Public Sphere. 2010
- "Does the quality of democracy matter for women's rights? Just debate and democratic transition in Chile and South Africa", Comparative Political Studies 2012

== Selected awards ==
- 2006 Hannah Arendt Award in Politics, New School for Social Research
- 2007 Best Dissertation Prize, Women in Politics Research Section of the American Political Science Association
- 2014 University of Virginia All-University Teaching Award
