= Katrin Thoma =

German rower

Personal information
- Born: 7 August 1990 (age 35) Frankfurt, Germany
- Height: 1.69 m (5 ft 7 in)
- Weight: 57 kg (126 lb)

Sport
- Country: Germany
- Sport: Rowing
- Coached by: Ralf Hollmann
Medal record
Rowing
Representing Germany
World Championships
Gold medal – first place	2015 Aiguebelette	Quadruple sculls
Silver medal – second place	2016 Rotterdam	Quadruple sculls
Bronze medal – third place	2014 Amsterdam	Quadruple sculls
World U23 Championships
Bronze medal – third place	2011 Amsterdam	Quadruple sculls

Katrin Thoma (born 7 August 1990) is a German rower. She is a World champion in the quadruple sculls and a World U23 bronze medalist.
