= Dimitra Kontou =

Greek rower (born 2005)

Personal information
- Born: 23 September 2005 (age 21) Mytilene, Greece

Sport
- Country: Greece
- Sport: Rowing
- Event: Women's lightweight single sculls
Medal record
Women's rowing
Representing Greece
Olympic Games
Bronze medal – third place	2024 Paris	Lwt double sculls
European Championships
Silver medal – second place	2025 Plovdiv	Double sculls
Silver medal – second place	2024 Szeged	LW2x
Silver medal – second place	2023 Bled	LW2x
Silver medal – second place	2026 Varese	Double sculls
World U23 Championships
Gold medal – first place	2023 Plovdiv	LW2x
Gold medal – first place	2024 St. Catharines	LW2x
Gold medal – first place	2025 Poznan	W2x
Gold medal – first place	2025 Duisburg	W2x
Gold medal – first place	2025 Duisburg	Mix2x
European U23 Championships
Gold medal – first place	2022 Hazewinkel	W2x
Gold medal – first place	2024 Edirne	BLW2x

Dimitra Eleni "Milena" Kontou (Greek: Δήμητρα Ελένη (Μιλένα) Κοντού; born 23 September 2005) is a Greek rower. She competed at the 2024 Summer Olympics in the lightweight double sculls.

== Career ==
She was a gold medalist at the 2022 European Rowing U23 Championships in Belgium in the double sculls alongside Styliani Natsioula. She was also later a gold medalist at the 2023 World Rowing U23 Championships, setting a new World Best Time in the process, at the age of 18 years-old.

She was a silver medalist alongside Zoi Fitsiou at the 2023 European Rowing Championships in Bled, Slovenia, in the lightweight double sculls.

The pair secured a second silver lightweight double sculls silver medal at the 2024 European Rowing Championships in Szeged, Hungary in April 2024.

They gained qualification to the Olympic Games at the qualifying event in Lucerne in May 2024. They subsequently reached the final of the lightweight double sculls at the 2024 Summer Olympics in Paris, and won the bronze medal.

She won silver in the women's double sculls alongside Zoi Fitsiou at the 2025 European Rowing Championships in Plovdiv.
