= Ionela Cozmiuc =

Romanian rower (born 1995)

Personal information
- Full name: Ionela Livia Cozmiuc
- Nationality: Romanian
- Born: Ionela Livia Lehaci; 3 January 1995 (age 31) Câmpulung Moldovenesc, Romania
- Height: 179 cm (5 ft 10 in)
- Weight: 60 kg (132 lb)
- Spouse: Marius Cozmiuc

Sport
- Country: Romania
- Sport: Rowing
Medal record
Women's rowing
Representing Romania
Olympic Games
Silver medal – second place	2024 Paris	Lwt double sculls
World Championships
Gold medal – first place	2017 Sarasota	Lwt double sculls
Gold medal – first place	2018 Plovdiv	Lwt double sculls
Gold medal – first place	2022 Račice	Lwt single sculls
Gold medal – first place	2024 St. Catharines	Lwt single sculls
Bronze medal – third place	2023 Belgrade	Lwt double sculls
European Championships
Gold medal – first place	2022 Oberschleißheim	Lwt single sculls
Gold medal – first place	2023 Bled	Lwt single sculls
Gold medal – first place	2024 Szeged	Lwt double sculls
Bronze medal – third place	2020 Poznań	Lwt double sculls

Ionela Livia Cozmiuc (née Lehaci; born 3 January 1995) is a Romanian rower. She is a two-times world champion in the women's lightweight double sculls for Romania winning back to back world titles in 2017 and 2018, and taking another title in the lightweight single sculls in 2022. She competed in the women's lightweight double sculls event at the 2016 Summer Olympics.

In 2017, she married fellow Olympic rower Marius Cozmiuc.
