= Emily Craig =

British rower (born 1992)

Emily Craig MBE
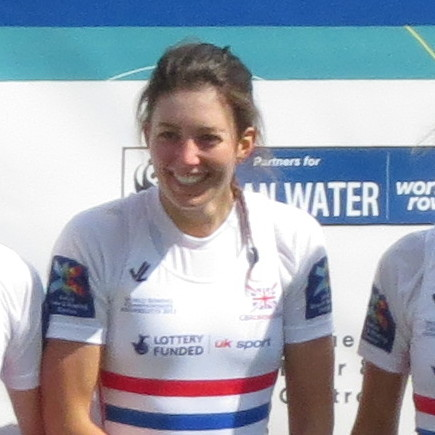
- Craig at the World Championships in 2015

Personal information
- Full name: Emily Elizabeth Craig
- Nationality: British
- Born: 30 November 1992 (age 33) Pembury, England
- Height: 1.73 m (5 ft 8 in)

Sport
- Country: Great Britain
- Sport: Rowing
- Events: Lightweight double sculls, Lightweight quadruple sculls
Medal record
Women's rowing
Representing Great Britain
Olympic Games
Gold medal – first place	2024 Paris	Lwt double sculls
World Championships
Gold medal – first place	2023 Belgrade	Lwt double sculls
Gold medal – first place	2022 Račice	Lwt double sculls
Bronze medal – third place	2019 Ottensheim	Lwt double sculls
Gold medal – first place	2016 Rotterdam	Lwt quad sculls
Silver medal – second place	2015 Aiguebelette-le-Lac	Lwt quad sculls
European Championships
Gold medal – first place	2023 Bled	Lwt double sculls
Gold medal – first place	2022 Oberschleißheim	Lwt double sculls
Silver medal – second place	2021 Varese	Lwt double sculls
Bronze medal – third place	2017 Račice	Lwt double sculls
U23 World Championships
Bronze medal – third place	2013 Ottensheim	Lwt quad sculls
World Cups
Gold medal – first place	2024 World Cup II	Lwt double sculls
Gold medal – first place	2024 World Cup I	Lwt double sculls
Gold medal – first place	2023 World Cup III	Lwt double sculls
Gold medal – first place	2023 World Cup II	Lwt double sculls
Gold medal – first place	2022 World Cup III	Lwt double sculls
Gold medal – first place	2022 World Cup I	Lwt double sculls
Gold medal – first place	2021 World Cup II	Lwt double sculls
Bronze medal – third place	2018 World Cup I	Lwt double sculls
Bronze medal – third place	2017 World Cup I	Lwt double sculls

Emily Elizabeth Craig (born 30 November 1992) is a British lightweight Olympic champion and three-time world champion rower.

== Education ==
Craig has a BA in History of Art from the Courtauld Institute of Art and a MA in East Asian art from the Sotheby's Institute of Art.

== Rowing career ==
Craig was part of the British team that topped the medal table at the 2015 World Rowing Championships at Lac d'Aiguebelette in France, where she won a silver medal as part of the lightweight quadruple sculls with Brianna Stubbs, Ruth Walczak and Eleanor Piggott.

At the 2016 World Rowing Championships in Rotterdam, Craig was part of the gold medal-winning team in the women's lightweight quadruple sculls, along with Brianna Stubbs, Eleanor Piggott and Imogen Walsh. She won a bronze medal at the 2019 World Rowing Championships in Ottensheim, Austria as part of the lightweight double sculls with Imogen Grant.

In 2021, she won a European silver medal in the lightweight double sculls in Varese, Italy.

She won a gold medal in the Lightweight Double Sculls at the 2022 European Rowing Championships and the 2022 World Rowing Championships. Craig then retained her titles at the 2023 European Rowing Championships in Bled and the 2023 World Rowing Championships in Belgrade.

Alongside rowing partner Imogen Grant, Craig suffered disappointment at the 2021 Tokyo Olympics, finishing half a second behind the gold medal crew and missing out on a medal by 0.01 seconds.

=== Olympic gold medal ===
At the 2024 Paris Olympics, again rowing with partner Imogen Grant, Craig won the gold medal in the same lightweight double sculls category.
