= Khadija Krimi =

Tunisian rower (born 1995)

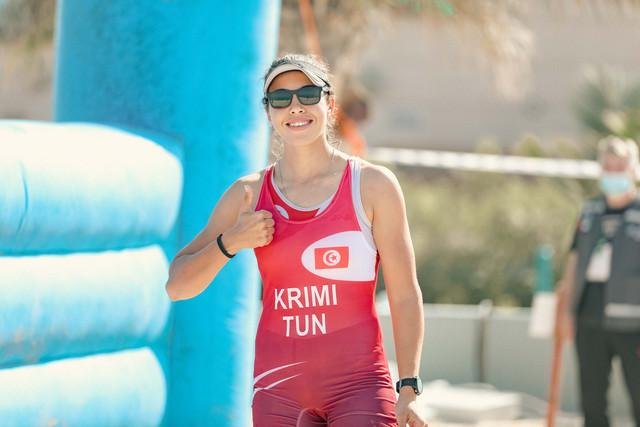

Medal record

Women's rowing

Representing Tunisia

World Championships
Silver medal – second place	2025 Shanghai	Lwt double sculls
Bronze medal – third place	2026 Amsterdam	Lwt double sculls

Mediterranean Games
Bronze medal – third place	2026 Taranto	LW2x
Bronze medal – third place	2026 Taranto	LMix2x

Khadija Krimi (born August 18, 1995) is a Tunisian rower. She and Nour El-Houda Ettaieb placed 20th in the women's lightweight double sculls event at the 2016 Summer Olympics.

She and her partner Ettaieb qualified to represent Tunisia at the 2020 Summer Olympics, placing 16^{th}.

Olympic Games
Preceded by Mehdi Ben Cheikh; Inès Boubakri	Flag bearer for Tunisia; Paris 2024 with Samil Jemai	Succeeded by Incumbent
