= Louisa Altenhuber =

Austrian rower

Personal information
- Nationality: Austrian
- Born: 24 July 1995 (age 30)

Sport
- Sport: Rowing

Louisa Altenhuber (born 24 July 1995) is an Austrian rower. She competed in the women's lightweight double sculls event at the 2020 Summer Olympics.
