= Federica Cesarini =

Italian rower (born 1996)

Personal information
- National team: Italy
- Born: 2 August 1996 (age 29) Cittiglio, Italy

Sport
- Sport: Rowing
- Club: G.S. Fiamme Oro
Medal record
| Event | 1st | 2nd | 3rd |
|---|---|---|---|
| Olympic Games | 1 | 0 | 0 |
| World Championships | 1 | 0 | 0 |
| European Championships | 1 | 5 | 0 |
| Total | 3 | 5 | 0 |
Olympic Games
| Gold medal – first place | 2020 Tokyo | Lwt double sculls |

Federica Cesarini (born 2 August 1996) is an Italian lightweight rower. She won the gold medal in the lightweight double sculls at 2020 Summer Olympics and in the lightweight quadruple sculls at the 2017 World Rowing Championships.

== Biography ==
Cesarini started the activity in 2009, having her senior debut in 2017. In addition to the international medals won at a senior level, at the youth level she won six more medals. She also won 16 National Championships, 5 of them in the lightweight single scull.

== Achievements ==
| Year | Competition | Venue | Rank | Event | Time |
|---|---|---|---|---|---|
| 2017 | World Championships | (United States) Sarasota | 1st | Lightweight quadruple sculls | 6:33.97 |

== See also ==
- Italian sportswomen multiple medalists at Olympics and World Championships
