= Weronika Deresz =

Polish rower (born 1985)

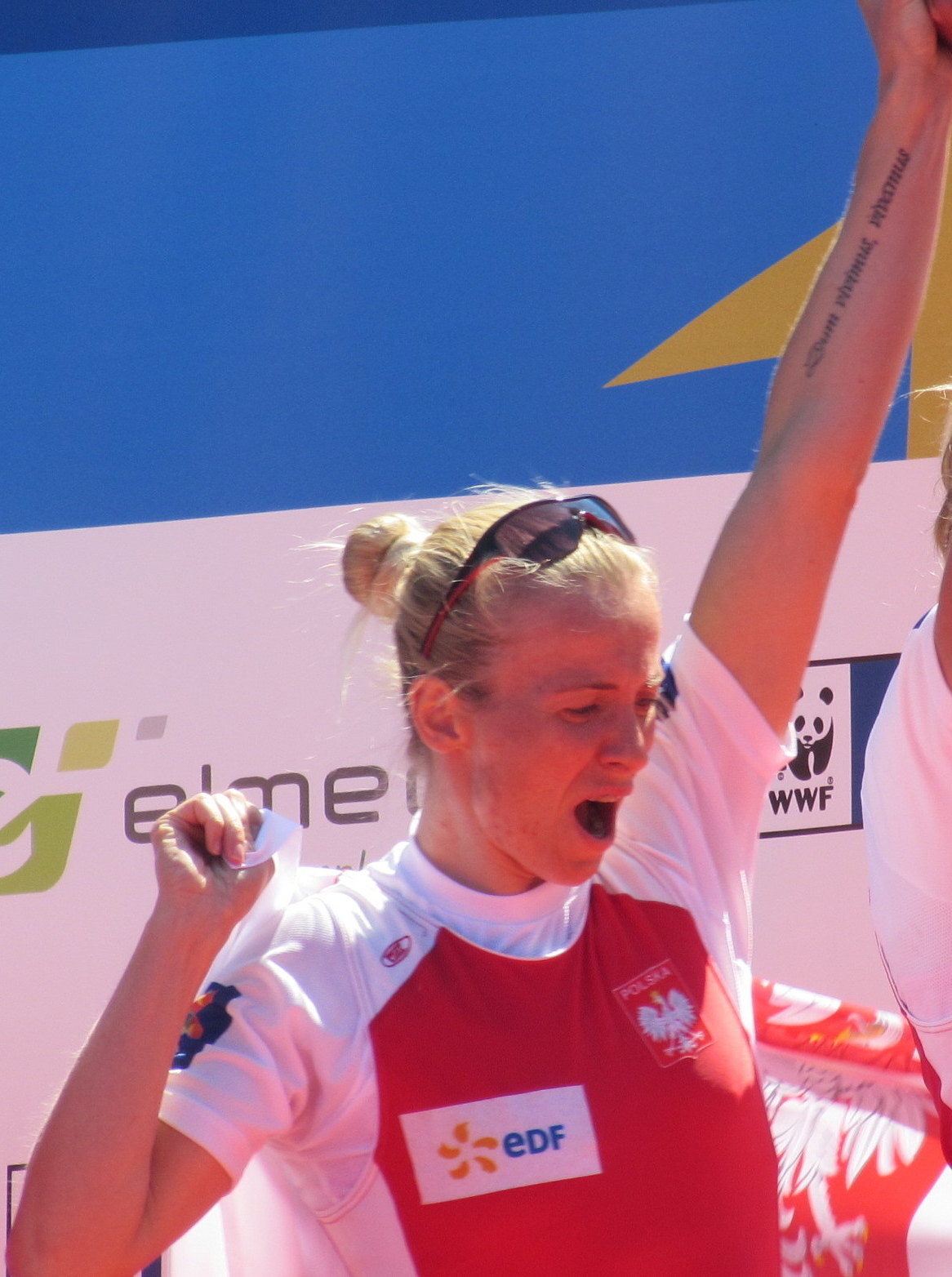
- Deresz in 2016

Personal information
- Born: 5 September 1985 (age 40) Warsaw, Poland

Sport
- Sport: Rowing
Medal record
Women's rowing
Representing Poland
World Championships
Gold medal – first place	2012 Plovdiv	LW4x
Silver medal – second place	2008 Linz	LW4x
European Championships
Gold medal – first place	2017 Račice	LW2x
Silver medal – second place	2008 Athens	LW2x
Bronze medal – third place	2013 Sevilla	LW2x
Bronze medal – third place	2015 Poznan	LW2x
Bronze medal – third place	2016 Brandenburg	LW2x

Weronika Deresz (born 5 September 1985) is a Polish rower. She competed in the women's lightweight double sculls event at the 2016 Summer Olympics.
