= Aoife Casey =

Irish rower (born 1999)

Personal information
- Nationality: Irish
- Born: 1 June 1999 (age 27)

Sport
- Sport: Rowing
Medal record
Women's rowing
Representing Ireland
World Championships
Bronze medal – third place	2022 Račice	Lwt double sculls

Aoife Casey (born 1 June 1999) is an Irish rower. She competed in the women's lightweight double sculls event at the 2020 Summer Olympics.
