= Patricia Merz =

Swiss rower

Personal information
- Nationality: Swiss
- Born: 2 June 1993 (age 31)

Sport
- Sport: Rowing

Patricia Merz (born 2 June 1993) is a Swiss rower. She competed in the women's lightweight double sculls event at the 2020 Summer Olympics.
