= Claire Bové =

French rower (born 1998)

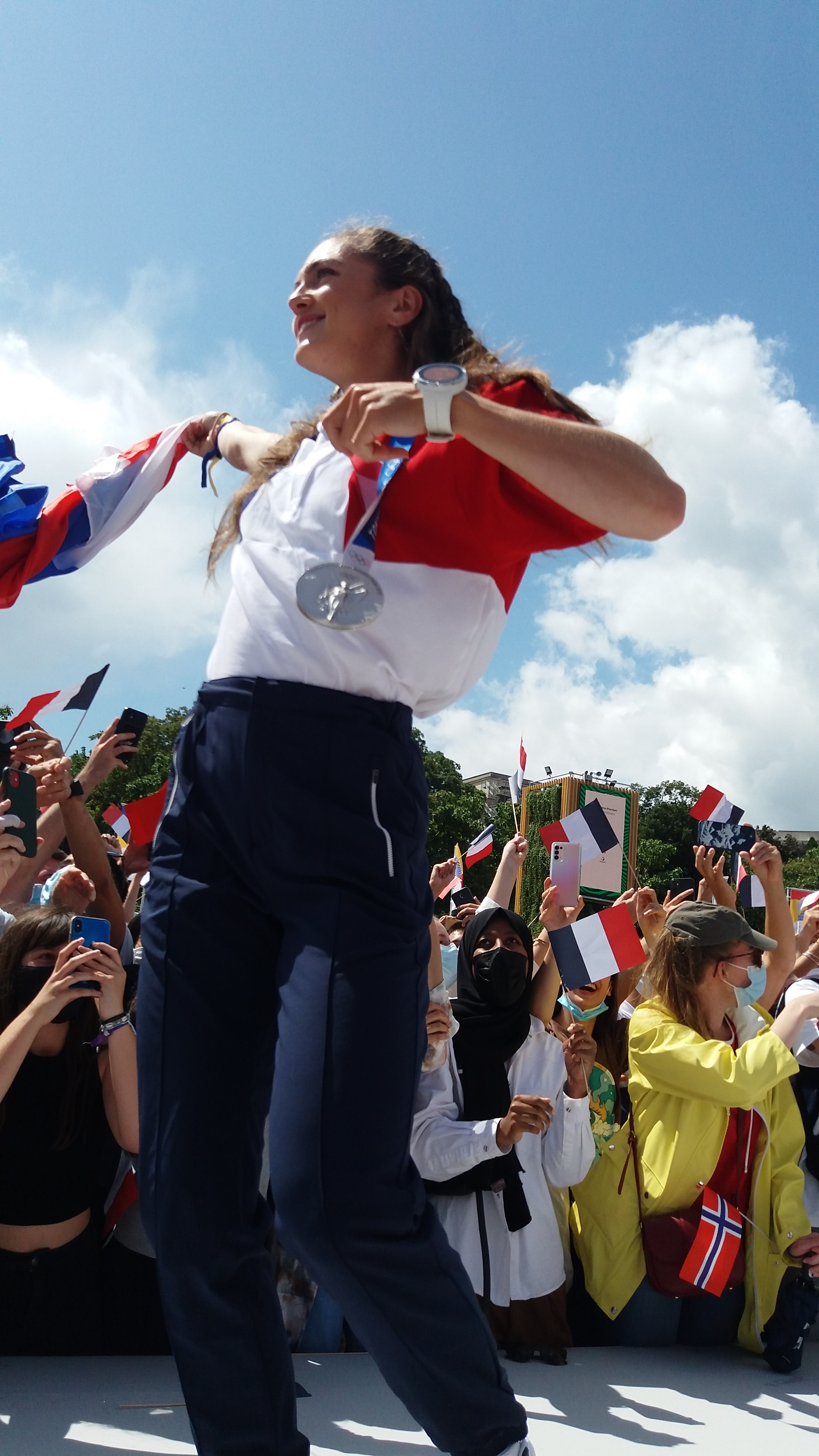
- Bové in 2021

Personal information
- Born: 3 June 1998 (age 28) Aubergenville, France
- Height: 1.68 m (5 ft 6 in)
- Weight: 58 kg (128 lb)

Sport
- Country: France
- Sport: Rowing
- Club: Association Sportive Mantaise
Medal record
Women's rowing
Representing France
Olympic Games
Silver medal – second place	2020 Tokyo	Lwt double sculls
European Championships
Bronze medal – third place	2023 Bled	Lwt double sculls

Claire Bové (born 3 June 1998) is a French rower. She competed in the women's lightweight double sculls event at the 2020 Summer Olympics.
