= Valentina Rodini =

Italian rower (born 1995)

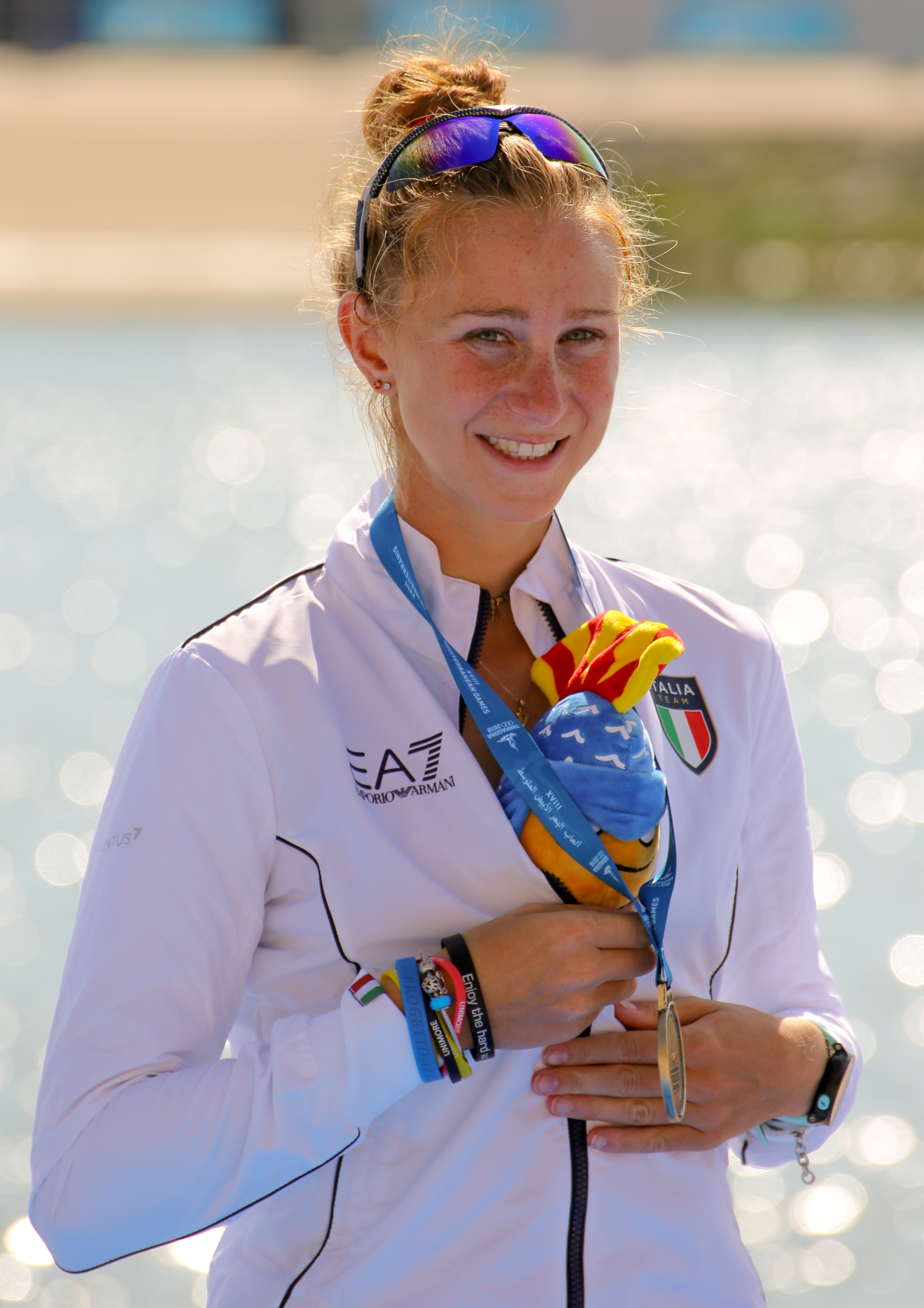
- Rodini in 2018

Personal information
- National team: Italy
- Born: 28 January 1995 (age 31) Cremona, Italy

Sport
- Sport: Rowing
- Club: Fiamme Gialle
- Coached by: Ugo Lamberini
Medal record
Women's rowing
Representing Italy
Event	1st	2nd	3rd
Olympic Games	1	0	0
European Championships	0	1	0
Universiade	0	0	1
Mediterranean Games	1	0	0
World U23 Championships	2	1	1
World Junior Championships	1	0	0
European Junior Championships	0	1	1
Total	5	3	3
Olympic Games
Gold medal – first place	2020 Tokyo	Lwt double sculls
European Championships
Bronze medal – third place	2024 Szeged	Lwt double sculls
Summer Universiade
Bronze medal – third place	2015 Chungju	Lightweight double sculls
Mediterranean Games
Gold medal – first place	2018 Tarragona	Lightweight single sculls

Valentina Rodini (born 28 January 1995) is an Italian rower. She competed in the women's lightweight double sculls event at the 2016 Summer Olympics, and won gold medal in the same event at 2020 Summer Olympics.

== Career ==
She competed at the 2013 World Rowing Junior Championships winning a gold medal, and 2015 Summer Universiade, winning a bronze medal.
