= Ayami Oishi =

Japanese rower (born 1991)

Personal information
- Born: 9 April 1991 (age 35)

Sport
- Sport: Rowing

Ayami Oishi (大石 綾美, Ōishi Ayami; born 9 April 1991) is a Japanese rower. She competed in the women's lightweight double sculls event at the 2016 Summer Olympics.

On 8 October 2024, she announced her retirement as a player.
