= Jackie Kiddle =

New Zealand rower (born 1994)

Personal information
- Born: 16 July 1994 (age 32) New Plymouth, New Zealand
- Height: 165 cm (5 ft 5 in)

Sport
- Country: New Zealand
- Sport: Rowing
- Event: Lightweight double sculls
- Club: Star Boating Club
Medal record
Women's rowing
Representing New Zealand
World Championships
Gold medal – first place	2019 Ottensheim	Lwt double sculls
Silver medal – second place	2017 Sarasota	Lwt double sculls
Bronze medal – third place	2022 Račice	Lwt single sculls
World Championships (U23)
Gold medal – first place	2015 Plovdiv	Lwt double sculls
Silver medal – second place	2016 Rotterdam	Lwt double sculls

Jackie Kiddle (born 16 July 1994) is a rower from New Zealand. She participated in Woman's rowing sport and represented New Zealand in several International Championships(including U23).

== Life ==
Kiddle received her education at Wellington Girls' College, and she took up rowing in 2008 in her final year. She represented New Zealand at the 2013 Australian Youth Olympic Festival. Kiddle's first appearance at a FISA event was at the 2014 World Rowing U23 Championships in Varese, Italy, where she came fourth in the lightweight single sculls. At the 2015 World Rowing U23 Championships in Plovdiv, Bulgaria, she won gold in the lightweight double sculls with Zoe McBride, setting a new world best time. At the 2016 World Rowing U23 Championships at the Willem-Alexander Baan in Rotterdam, Netherlands, she won a silver medal lightweight double sculls with Lucy Jonas. At the 2017 World Rowing Championships in Sarasota, Florida, she won a silver medal in the lightweight double sculls partnered with Zoe McBride. At the 2018 World Rowing Championships in Plovdiv, Bulgaria, McBride and Kiddle came sixth in the lightweight double sculls.

Kiddle completed an MSc in animal behaviour at the University of Waikato in 2021.
