= Laura Tarantola =

French rower (born 1994)

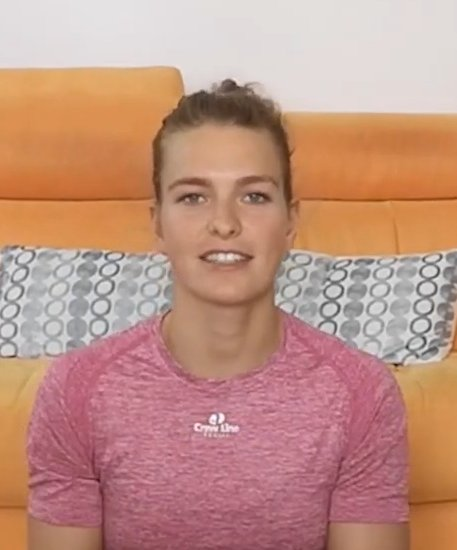
- 2020

Personal information
- Full name: Laura Cécile Tarantola
- Born: 8 June 1994 (age 32) Grenoble, France
- Height: 1.73 m (5 ft 8 in)
- Weight: 69 kg (152 lb)

Sport
- Country: France
- Sport: Rowing
- Club: Aviron Grenoblois
Medal record
Women's rowing
Representing France
Olympic Games
Silver medal – second place	2020 Tokyo	Lwt double sculls
World Championships
Gold medal – first place	2018 Plovdiv	Lwt single sculls
European Championships
Silver medal – second place	2018 Glasgow	Lwt single sculls
Silver medal – second place	2019 Lucerne	Lwt double sculls
Bronze medal – third place	2023 Bled	Lwt double sculls

Laura Cécile Tarantola (born 8 June 1994) is a French rower. At the 2018 European Rowing Championships in Glasgow, Scotland, she won the silver medal in light weight skiffs. In the 2018 World Rowing Championships in Plovdiv, Bulgaria, she won a gold medal in the women's lightweight single sculls event.
