= Frédérique Rol =

Swiss rower

Personal information
- Nationality: Swiss
- Born: 26 May 1993 (age 31); Lausanne, Switzerland

Sport
- Sport: Rowing

Frédérique Rol (born 26 May 1993) is a Swiss rower. She competed in the women's lightweight double sculls event at the 2020 Summer Olympics.
