= Jill Moffatt =

Canadian rower (born 1993)

Jill Moffatt OLY
Personal information
- Born: February 9, 1993 (age 33) Newcastle, Ontario, Canada
- Height: 168 cm (5 ft 6 in)
- Weight: 57 kg (126 lb)

Sport
- Country: Canada
- Sport: Rowing

Jill Moffatt (born February 9, 1993) is a Canadian rower.

== Career ==
At the 2019 World Rowing Championships, Moffatt, along with partner Jennifer Casson finished eighth in the women's lightweight double sculls, finishing one spot out of qualifying the boat for the 2020 Olympics. However, in 2021, New Zealand declined its quota place, allowing the pair to qualify for the games.

In June 2021, Moffatt was named to Canada's 2020 Olympic team in the women's lightweight double sculls with partner Jennifer Casson.
