= Jennifer Casson =

Canadian rower (born 1995)

Personal information
- Full name: Jennifer Joan Casson
- Nickname: Jenny
- Born: August 30, 1995 (age 31) Kingston, Ontario, Canada
- Height: 175 cm (5 ft 9 in)
- Weight: 61 kg (134 lb)

Sport
- Country: Canada
- Sport: Rowing
- College team: Tulsa Golden Hurricane

Jennifer Casson (born August 30, 1995) is a Canadian rower.

== Career ==
At the 2019 World Rowing Championships, Casson along with partner Jill Moffatt finished eighth in the women's lightweight double sculls, finishing one spot out of qualifying the boat for the 2020 Olympics. However, in 2021, New Zealand declined its quota place, allowing Casson and Moffatt to qualify for the games.

In 2019, Casson broke the world indoor rowing record for 2,000 m – 6:53.8.

In June 2021, Casson was named to Canada's 2020 Olympic team in the women's lightweight double sculls with partner Jill Moffatt.
