= Rowing at the 2004 Summer Olympics – Women's lightweight double sculls =

Women's lightweight double sculls at the Games of the XXVIII Olympiad

Medalists
1st place, gold medalist(s)		Constanța Burcică; Angela Alupei	Romania
2nd place, silver medalist(s)		Daniela Reimer; Claudia Blasberg	Germany
3rd place, bronze medalist(s)		Kirsten van der Kolk; Marit van Eupen	Netherlands

These are the results of the Women's lightweight double sculls competition, one of six events for female competitors in Rowing at the 2004 Summer Olympics in Athens. The Rowing events were held at the Schinias Olympic Rowing and Canoeing Centre.

== Medalists ==
Gold	Constanța Burcică & Angela Alupei; Romania
Silver	Daniela Reimer & Claudia Blasberg; Germany
Bronze	Kirsten van der Kolk & Marit van Eupen; Netherlands

== Heats - 15 August ==
=== Heat 1 ===
Rank	Rowers	Country	Time	Notes
1	Constanța Burcică, Angela Alupei	Romania	6:50.64	SA/B
2	Magdalena Kemnitz, Ilona Mokronowska	Poland	6:51.46	R
3	Teresa Mas, Eva Mirones	Spain	7:02.33	R
4	Maria Sakellaridou, Chrysi Biskitzi	Greece	7:05.52	R
5	Kahori Uchiyama, Akiko Iwamoto	Japan	7:14.04	R
6	Hiền Phạm Thị, Nguyễn Thị Thị	Vietnam	7:42.43	R

=== Heat 2 ===
Rank	Rowers	Country	Time	Notes
1	Daniela Reimer, Claudia Blasberg	Germany	6:52.47	SA/B
2	Xu Dongxiang, Li Qian	China	6:54.66	R
3	Kirsten van der Kolk, Marit van Eupen	Netherlands	7:00.46	R
4	Lisa Schlenker, Stacey Borgman	United States	7:04.01	R
5	Edit Stift, Monika Remsei	Hungary	7:12.79	R
6	Gabriela Huerta, Aline Olvera	Mexico	7:18.16	R

=== Heat 3 ===
Rank	Rowers	Country	Time	Notes
1	Sally Newmarch, Amber Halliday	Australia	6:49.90	SA/B, OB, WB
2	Mara Jones, Fiona Milne	Canada	6:53.47	R
3	Juliane Rasmussen, Johanne Thomsen	Denmark	6:56.62	R
4	Helen Casey, Tracy Langlands	Great Britain	6:59.19	R
5	Dailin Aguilar, Ismaray Marrero	Cuba	7:18.35	R
6	Milka Kraljev, Lucia Palermo	Argentina	7:25.11	R

== Repechage - 17 August ==
=== Repechage 1 ===
Rank	Rowers	Country	Time	Notes
1	Xu Dongxiang, Li Qian	China	6:54.48	SA/B
2	Helen Casey, Tracy Langlands	Great Britain	6:59.63	SA/B
3	Maria Mas de Xaxars Rivero, Eva Mirones Sola	Spain	7:02.91	SA/B
4	Edit Stift, Monika Remsei	Hungary	7:07.69	FC
5	Hiền Phạm Thị, Nguyễn Thị Thị	Vietnam	7:35.29	FC

=== Repechage 2 ===
Rank	Rowers	Country	Time	Notes
1	Magdalena Kemnitz, Ilona Mokronowska	Poland	6:53.74	SA/B
2	Lisa Schlenker, Stacey Borgman	United States	6:54.12	SA/B
3	Juliane Rasmussen, Johanne Thomsen	Denmark	6:57.84	SA/B
4	Kahori Uchiyama, Akiko Iwamoto	Japan	7:07.07	FC
5	Milka Kraljev, Lucia Palermo	Argentina	7:23.22	FC

=== Repechage 3 ===
Rank	Rowers	Country	Time	Notes
1	Kirsten van der Kolk, Marit van Eupen	Netherlands	6:52.53	SA/B
2	Mara Jones, Fiona Milne	Canada	6:54.04	SA/B
3	Maria Sakellaridou, Chrysi Biskitzi	Greece	7:04.98	SA/B
4	Dailin Taset Aguilar, Ismaray Marrero Aria	Cuba	7:14.01	FC
5	Gabriela Huerta Trillo, Aline Olvera Clauzier	Mexico	7:23.07	FC

== Semifinal A/B - 19 August ==
=== Semifinal 1 ===
Rank	Rowers	Country	Time	Notes
1	Constanța Burcică, Angela Alupei	Romania	6:51.84	FA
2	Kirsten van der Kolk, Marit van Eupen	Netherlands	6:53.10	FA
3	Daniela Reimer, Claudia Blasberg	Germany	6:53.43	FA
4	Lisa Schlenker, Stacey Borgman	United States	6:54.16	FB
5	Helen Casey, Tracy Langlands	Great Britain	6:59.23	FB
6	Maria Sakellaridou, Chrysi Biskitzi	Greece	7:15.45	FB

=== Semifinal 2 ===
Rank	Rowers	Country	Time	Notes
1	Sally Newmarch, Amber Halliday	Australia	6:54.01	FA
2	Magdalena Kemnitz, Ilona Mokronowska	Poland	6:54.49	FA
3	Xu Dongxiang, Li Qian	China	6:55.66	FA
4	Mara Jones, Fiona Milne	Canada	6:56.64	FB
5	Juliane Rasmussen, Johanne Thomsen	Denmark	7:01.98	FB
6	Maria Mas de Xaxars Rivero, Eva Mirones Sola	Spain	7:09.21	FB

== Final - 21 August ==
=== Final C ===
Rank	Rowers	Country	Time
1	Kahori Uchiyama, Akiko Iwamoto	Japan	7:37.46
2	Dailin Taset Aguilar, Ismaray Marrero Aria	Cuba	7:42.20
3	Edit Stift, Monika Remsei	Hungary	7:45.05
4	Gabriela Huerta Trillo, Aline Olvera Clauzier	Mexico	7:48.02
5	Milka Kraljev, Lucia Palermo	Argentina	7:54.32
6	Pham Thi Hien, Eva Mirones Sola	Vietnam	8:14.80

=== Final B ===
Rank	Rowers	Country	Time
1	Lisa Schlenker, Stacey Borgman	United States	7:23.40
2	Mara Jones, Fiona Milne	Canada	7:26.07
3	Helen Casey, Tracy Langlands	Great Britain	7:29.12
4	Juliane Rasmussen, Johanne Thomsen	Denmark	7:32.58
5	Maria Mas de Xaxars Rivero, Eva Mirones Sola	Spain	7:41.23
6	Maria Sakellaridou, Chrysi Biskitzi	Greece	7:48.42

=== Final A ===
Rank	Rowers	Country	Time
Gold medal	Constanța Burcică, Angela Alupei	Romania	6:56.05
Silver medal	Daniela Reimer, Claudia Blasberg	Germany	6:57.33
Bronze medal	Kirsten van der Kolk, Marit van Eupen	Netherlands	6:58.54
4	Sally Newmarch, Amber Halliday	Australia	6:59.91
5	Xu Dongxiang, Li Qian	China	7:02.05
6	Magdalena Kemnitz, Ilona Mokronowska	Poland	7:04.48
