= Rowing at the 2000 Summer Olympics – Women's lightweight double sculls =

Women's lightweight double sculls at the Games of the XXVII Olympiad
- Venue: Sydney International Regatta Centre
- Date: 18–24 September 2000
- Competitors: 36 from 18 nations
- Winning time: 7:02.64

Medalists
| 1st place, gold medalist(s) | | Angela Alupei; Constanța Burcică | Romania |
| 2nd place, silver medalist(s) | | Claudia Blasberg; Valerie Viehoff | Germany |
| 3rd place, bronze medalist(s) | | Christine Collins; Sarah Garner | United States |

The women's lightweight double sculls competition at the 2000 Summer Olympics in Sydney, Australia took place at the Sydney International Regatta Centre.

== Competition format ==
This rowing event is a double scull event, meaning that each boat is propelled by a pair of rowers. The "scull" portion means that the rower uses two oars, one on each side of the boat; this contrasts with sweep rowing in which each rower has one oar and rows on only one side. As a lightweight rowing competition, the body mass of the rowers was limited to a maximum of 72.5 kilograms each and 70 kilograms on average.

The competition consisted of multiple rounds. Finals were held to determine the placing of each boat; these finals were given letters with those nearer to the beginning of the alphabet meaning a better ranking. Semifinals were named based on which finals they fed, with each semifinal having two possible finals.

With 18 boats in heats, the best boats qualify directly for the semi-finals. All other boats progress to the repechage round, which offers a second chance to qualify for the semi-finals. Unsuccessful boats from the repechage must proceed to final C, which determines places 13–18. The best three boats in each of the two semi-finals qualify for final A, which determines places 1–6 (including the medals). Meanwhile, unsuccessful boats from semi-finals A/B must proceed to final B, which determines places 7–12.

== Schedule ==
All times are Australian Time (UTC+10)

| Date | Time | Round |
|---|---|---|
| Monday, 18 September 2000 | 08:30 | Heats |
| Wednesday, 20 September 2000 | 08:30 | Repechages |
| Friday, 22 September 2000 | 08:30 | Semifinals |
| Saturday, 23 September 2000 | 11:10 | Final B |
| Saturday, 23 September 2000 | 12:10 | Final C |
| Sunday, 24 September 2000 | 08:30 | Final |

== Results ==
=== Heats ===
The winner of each heat advanced to the semifinals, remainder goes to the repechage.

==== Heat 1 ====
| Rank | Rower | Country | Time | Notes |
|---|---|---|---|---|
| 1 | Claudia Blasberg; Valerie Viehoff | Germany | 7:11.27 | Q |
| 2 | Christelle Fernandez-Schulte; Bénédicte Luzuy | France | 7:16.53 | R |
| 3 | Ou Shaoyan; Yu Hua | China | 7:21.55 | R |
| 4 | Akiko Iwamoto; Ayako Yoshida | Japan | 7:27.12 | R |
| 5 | María Montoya; Ana Sofía Soberanes | Mexico | 7:36.51 | R |
| 6 | Im Jin-myeong; Mun Hae-yeong | South Korea | 8:00.45 | R |

==== Heat 2 ====
| Rank | Rower | Country | Time | Notes |
|---|---|---|---|---|
| 1 | Christine Collins; Sarah Garner | United States | 7:09.99 | Q |
| 2 | Virginia Lee; Sally Newmarch | Australia | 7:11.11 | R |
| 3 | Marit van Eupen; Kirsten van der Kolk | Netherlands | 7:18.04 | R |
| 4 | Tracy Duncan; Fiona Milne | Canada | 7:20.60 | R |
| 5 | Viktoriya Dimitrova; Margarita Petrova | Bulgaria | 7:22.51 | R |
| 6 | Marlenis Mesa; Dailin Taset | Cuba | 7:38.26 | R |

==== Heat 3 ====
| Rank | Rower | Country | Time | Notes |
|---|---|---|---|---|
| 1 | Angela Alupei; Constanța Burcică | Romania | 7:16.65 | Q |
| 2 | Kim Plugge; Pia Vogel | Switzerland | 7:21.43 | R |
| 3 | Chrysi Biskitzi; Angeliki Gremou | Greece | 7:23.89 | R |
| 4 | Elżbieta Kuncewicz; Ilona Mokronowska | Poland | 7:28.99 | R |
| 5 | María Garisoain; Marisa Peguri | Argentina | 7:30.74 | R |
| 6 | Anna Alliquander; Mónika Remsei | Hungary | 7:31.05 | R |

=== Repechage ===
First three qualify to semifinals A/B, the remainder to final C.

==== Repechage 1 ====
| Rank | Rower | Country | Time | Notes |
|---|---|---|---|---|
| 1 | Marit van Eupen; Kirsten van der Kolk | Netherlands | 7:10.46 | A/B |
| 2 | Christelle Fernandez-Schulte; Benedicte Luzuy | France | 7:11.46 | A/B |
| 3 | Elżbieta Kuncewicz; Ilona Mokronowska | Poland | 7:20.87 | A/B |
| 4 | Marlenis Mesa; Dailin Taset | Cuba | 7:29.10 | C |
| 5 | María Montoya; Ana Sofía Soberanes | Mexico | 7:33.58 | C |

==== Repechage 2 ====
| Rank | Rower | Country | Time | Notes |
|---|---|---|---|---|
| 1 | Virginia Lee; Sally Newmarch | Australia | 7:14.08 | A/B |
| 2 | Chrysi Biskitzi; Angeliki Gremou | Greece | 7:17.38 | A/B |
| 3 | Viktoriya Dimitrova; Margarita Petrova | Bulgaria | 7:18.90 | A/B |
| 4 | Anna Alliquander; Mónika Remsei | Hungary | 7:20.21 | C |
| 5 | Akiko Iwamoto; Ayako Yoshida | Japan | 7:23.36 | C |

==== Repechage 3 ====
| Rank | Rower | Country | Time | Notes |
|---|---|---|---|---|
| 1 | Kim Plugge; Pia Vogel | Switzerland | 7:12.99 | A/B |
| 2 | Tracy Duncan; Fiona Milne | Canada | 7:18.83 | A/B |
| 3 | Ou Shaoyan; Yu Hua | China | 7:21.00 | A/B |
| 4 | María Garisoain; Marisa Peguri | Argentina | 7:28.19 | C |
| 5 | Im Jin-myeong; Mun Hae-yeong | South Korea | 7:55.74 | C |

=== Semifinals ===
First three places advance to Final A, the remainder to Final B.

==== Semifinal 1 ====
| Rank | Rower | Country | Time | Notes |
|---|---|---|---|---|
| 1 | Angela Alupei; Constanța Burcică | Romania | 6:59.85 | A |
| 2 | Claudia Blasberg; Valerie Viehoff | Germany | 7:02.46 | A |
| 3 | Virginia Lee; Sally Newmarch | Australia | 7:06.58 | A |
| 4 | Christelle Fernandez-Schulte; Benedicte Luzuy | France | 7:09.32 | B |
| 5 | Tracy Duncan; Fiona Milne | Canada | 7:14.58 | B |
| 6 | Viktoriya Dimitrova; Margarita Petrova | Bulgaria | 7:22.47 | B |

==== Semifinal 2 ====
| Rank | Rower | Country | Time | Notes |
|---|---|---|---|---|
| 1 | Christine Collins; Sarah Garner | United States | 7:04.86 | A |
| 2 | Marit van Eupen; Kirsten van der Kolk | Netherlands | 7:07.16 | A |
| 3 | Kim Plugge; Pia Vogel | Switzerland | 7:07.22 | A |
| 4 | Elżbieta Kuncewicz; Ilona Mokronowska | Poland | 7:08.73 | B |
| 5 | Ou Shaoyan; Yu Hua | China | 7:18.60 | B |
| 6 | Chrysi Biskitzi; Angeliki Gremou | Greece | 7:21.88 | B |

==== Final C ====
| Rank | Rower | Country | Time | Notes |
|---|---|---|---|---|
| 1 | Anna Alliquander; Mónika Remsei | Hungary | 7:13.22 | |
| 2 | Akiko Iwamoto; Ayako Yoshida | Japan | 7:15.01 | |
| 3 | Marlenis Mesa; Dailin Taset | Cuba | 7:19.63 | |
| 4 | María Montoya; Ana Sofía Soberanes | Mexico | 7:25.00 | |
| 5 | Im Jin-myeong; Mun Hae-yeong | South Korea | 7:42.07 | |
| — | María Garisoain; Marisa Peguri | Argentina | | DNS |

==== Final B ====
| Rank | Rower | Country | Time | Notes |
|---|---|---|---|---|
| 1 | Christelle Fernandez-Schulte; Benedicte Luzuy | France | 7:10.70 | |
| 2 | Elżbieta Kuncewicz; Ilona Mokronowska | Poland | 7:12.76 | |
| 3 | Tracy Duncan; Fiona Milne | Canada | 7:13.76 | |
| 4 | Ou Shaoyan; Yu Hua | China | 7:15.31 | |
| 5 | Chrysi Biskitzi; Angeliki Gremou | Greece | 7:17.11 | |
| 6 | Viktoriya Dimitrova; Margarita Petrova | Bulgaria | 7:17.64 | |

==== Final A ====
| Rank | Rower | Country | Time | Notes |
|---|---|---|---|---|
| 1st place, gold medalist(s) | Angela Alupei; Constanța Burcică | Romania | 7:02.64 | |
| 2nd place, silver medalist(s) | Claudia Blasberg; Valerie Viehoff | Germany | 7:02.95 | |
| 3rd place, bronze medalist(s) | Christine Collins; Sarah Garner | United States | 7:06.37 | |
| 4 | Virginia Lee; Sally Newmarch | Australia | 7:12.04 | |
| 5 | Kim Plugge; Pia Vogel | Switzerland | 7:15.57 | |
| 6 | Marit van Eupen; Kirsten van der Kolk | Netherlands | 7:17.89 | |
