= Rowing at the 2008 Summer Olympics – Women's lightweight double sculls =

Women's lightweight double sculls at the Games of the XXIX Olympiad

Medalists
1st place, gold medalist(s)		Kirsten van der Kolk and Marit van Eupen	Netherlands
2nd place, silver medalist(s)		Minna Nieminen and Sanna Stén	Finland
3rd place, bronze medalist(s)		Tracy Cameron and Melanie Kok	Canada

Women's lightweight double sculls competition at the 2008 Summer Olympics in Beijing was held between August 10 and 17 at the Shunyi Olympic Rowing-Canoeing Park.

This rowing event is a double sculls event, meaning that each boat is propelled by a pair of rowers. The "scull" portion means that the rower uses two oars, one on each side of the boat; this contrasts with sweep rowing in which each rower has one oar and rows on only one side. As a lightweight rowing competition, the body mass of the rowers was limited to a maximum of 59 kilograms each and 57 kilograms on average.

The competition consisted of multiple rounds. Finals were held to determine the placing of each boat; these finals were given letters with those nearer to the beginning of the alphabet meaning a better ranking. Semifinals were named based on which finals they fed, with each semifinal having two possible finals.

During the first round three heats were held. The top two boats in each heat advanced to the A/B semifinals, with the rest going to the repechage. The repechage heats gave rowers another chance at the top semifinals, as the best three boats in each of the two repechage heats also moved on to the A/B semifinals. The remaining boats went from the repechage to the C final.

Only A/B semifinals were held. For each of the two semifinal races, the top three boats moved on to the better of the two finals (the A final), while the bottom three boats went to the lesser of the two finals (the B final).

The third and final round was the Finals. Each final determined a set of rankings. The A final determined the medals, along with the rest of the places through 6th. The B final gave rankings from 7th to 12th. The C final gave the rest of the rankings, down to 17th place of the 17 boats competing.

== Schedule ==
All times are China Standard Time (UTC+8)

Date	Time	Round
Sunday, August 10, 2008	14:50-15:20	Heats
Tuesday, August 12, 2008	16:00-16:20	Repechages
Friday, August 15, 2008	15:30-15:50	Semifinals A/B
Saturday, August 16, 2008	14:10-14:20	Final C
Saturday, August 16, 2008	14:30-14:40	Final B
Sunday, August 17, 2008	15:30-15:40	Final A

== Results ==
=== Heats ===
Qualification Rules: 1-2->SA/B, 3..->R

==== Heat 1 ====
Rank	Rowers	Country	Time	Notes
1	Kirsten van der Kolk, Marit van Eupen	Netherlands	6:50.90	SA/B
2	Amber Halliday, Marguerite Houston	Australia	6:53.23	SA/B
3	Renee Hykel, Jennifer Goldsack	United States	6:53.32	R
4	Gabriela Huerta, Lila Pérez-Rul	Mexico	7:11.71	R
5	Camila Carvalho, Luciana Granato	Brazil	7:25.90	R
6	Nataliya Voronova, Alexandra Opachanova	Kazakhstan	7:29.07	R

==== Heat 2 ====
Rank	Rowers	Country	Time	Notes
1	Berit Carow, Marie-Louise Dräger	Germany	6:51.96	SA/B
2	Melanie Kok, Tracy Cameron	Canada	6:54.07	SA/B
3	Hester Goodsell, Helen Casey	Great Britain	6:55.23	R
4	Sanna Stén, Minna Nieminen	Finland	6:56.61	R
5	Chrysi Biskitzi, Alexandra Tsiavou	Greece	7:05.95	R
6	Alex White, Kirsten McCann	South Africa	7:20.51	R

==== Heat 3 ====
Rank	Rowers	Country	Time	Notes
1	Xu Dongxiang, Yu Hua	China	6:57.58	SA/B
2	Katrin Olsen, Juliane Rasmussen	Denmark	6:58.63	SA/B
3	Misaki Kumakura, Akiko Iwamoto	Japan	7:05.67	R
4	Yaima Velázquez, Ismaray Marrero	Cuba	7:13.35	R
5	Ko Young-eun, Ji Yoo-jin	South Korea	7:39.70	R

=== Repechages ===
Qualification Rules: 1-3->SA/B, 4..->FC

==== Repechage 1 ====
Rank	Rowers	Country	Time	Notes
1	Renee Hykel, Jennifer Goldsack	United States	7:22.22	SA/B
2	Sanna Stén, Minna Nieminen	Finland	7:23.80	SA/B
3	Misaki Kumakura, Akiko Iwamoto	Japan	7:30.92	SA/B
4	Alex White, Kirsten McCann	South Africa	7:48.04	FC
5	Natalya Voronova, Alexandra Opachanova	Kazakhstan	7:54.12	FC
6	Ko Young-Eun, Ji Yoo-Jin	South Korea	8:03.51	FC

==== Repechage 2 ====
Rank	Rowers	Country	Time	Notes
1	Hester Goodsell, Helen Casey	Great Britain	7:24.27	SA/B
2	Chrysi Biskitzi, Alexandra Tsiavou	Greece	7:24.55	SA/B
3	Yaima Velazquez, Ismaray Marrero	Cuba	7:32.14	SA/B
4	Gabriela Huerta, Lila Perez Rul	Mexico	7:41.97	FC
5	Camila Carvalho, Luciana Granato	Brazil	7:47.53	FC

=== Semifinals A/B ===
Qualification Rules: 1-3->FA, 4..->FB

==== Semifinal A/B 1 ====
Rank	Rowers	Country	Time	Notes
1	Kirsten van der Kolk, Marit van Eupen	Netherlands	7:03.87	FA
2	Sanna Stén, Minna Nieminen	Finland	7:03.91	FA
3	Berit Carow, Marie-Louise Dräger	Germany	7:04.95	FA
4	Katrin Olsen, Juliane Rasmussen	Denmark	7:06.31	FB
5	Hester Goodsell, Helen Casey	Great Britain	7:17.67	FB
6	Yaima Velazquez, Ismaray Marrero	Cuba	7:30.15	FB

==== Semifinal A/B 2 ====
Rank	Rowers	Country	Time	Notes
1	Melanie Kok, Tracy Cameron	Canada	7:10.70	FA
2	Xu Dongxiang, Yu Hua	China	7:11.59	FA
3	Chrysi Biskitzi, Alexandra Tsiavou	Greece	7:11.99	FA
4	Renee Hykel, Jennifer Goldsack	United States	7:12.15	FB
5	Amber Halliday, Marguerite Houston	Australia	7:13.80	FB
6	Misaki Kumakura, Akiko Iwamoto	Japan	7:16.13	FB

=== Finals ===
==== Final C ====
Rank	Rowers	Country	Time	Notes
1	Gabriela Huerta, Lila Perez Rul	Mexico	7:17.21	
2	Alex White, Kirsten McCann	South Africa	7:20.49	
3	Camila Carvalho, Luciana Granato	Brazil	7:22.40	
4	Natalya Voronova, Alexandra Opachanova	Kazakhstan	7:32.36	
5	Ko Young-Eun, Ji Yoo-Jin	South Korea	7:39.46	

==== Final B ====
Rank	Rowers	Country	Time	Notes
1	Katrin Olsen, Juliane Rasmussen	Denmark	7:06.94	
2	Amber Halliday, Marguerite Houston	Australia	7:07.17	
3	Misaki Kumakura, Akiko Iwamoto	Japan	7:08.49	
4	Renee Hykel, Jennifer Goldsack	United States	7:09.02	
5	Hester Goodsell, Helen Casey	Great Britain	7:11.24	
6	Yaima Velazquez, Ismaray Marrero	Cuba	7:20.07	

==== Final A ====
Rank	Rowers	Country	Time	Notes
Gold medal	Kirsten van der Kolk, Marit van Eupen	Netherlands	6:54.74	
Silver medal	Sanna Stén, Minna Nieminen	Finland	6:56.03	
Bronze medal	Melanie Kok, Tracy Cameron	Canada	6:56.68	
4	Berit Carow, Marie-Louise Dräger	Germany	6:56.72	
5	Xu Dongxiang, Yu Hua	China	7:01.90	
6	Chrysi Biskitzi, Alexandra Tsiavou	Greece	7:04.61	
