= Rowing at the 2011 Pan American Games – Women's lightweight double sculls =

Rowing – Men's l.wght double sculls at the 2011 Pan American Games
- Venue: Canoe & Rowing Course
- Dates: October 15 - October 18
- Competitors: 12 from 6 nations

Medalists
Gold medal	Analicia Ramirez; Lila Perez Rul	Mexico
Silver medal	Yaima Velazquez; Yoslaine Dominguez	Cuba
Bronze medal	Michelle Sechser; Chelsea Smith	United States

The women's lightweight double sculls rowing event at the 2011 Pan American Games was held October 15–18 at the Canoe & Rowing Course in Ciudad Guzman. The defending Pan American Games champion was Yaima Velázquez & Ismaray Marerro of Cuba.

== Schedule ==
All times are Central Standard Time (UTC-6).

Date	Time	Round
October 15, 2011	10:30	Heat
October 18, 2011	9:49	Final

== Results ==
=== Heat 1 ===
Rank	Rowers	Country	Time	Notes
1	Michelle Sechser, Chelsea Smith	United States	7:23.67	FA
2	Yaima Velazquez, Yoslaine Dominguez	Cuba	7:26.26	FA
3	Analicia Ramirez, Lila Perez Rul	Mexico	7:27.92	FA
4	Sofia Esteras, Carolina Schiffmacher	Argentina	7:33.90	FA
5	Luciana Granato, Camila Carvalho	Brazil	7:36.2	FA
6	Jennieffer Zuñiga, Maria Samayoa	Guatemala	7:55.98	FA

=== Final A ===
Rank	Rowers	Country	Time	Notes
1st place, gold medalist(s)	Analicia Ramirez, Lila Perez Rul	Mexico	7:16.04	
2nd place, silver medalist(s)	Yaima Velazquez, Yoslaine Dominguez	Cuba	7:17.77	
3rd place, bronze medalist(s)	Michelle Sechser, Chelsea Smith	United States	7:18.88	
4	Sofia Esteras, Carolina Schiffmacher	Argentina	7:24.05	
5	Luciana Granato, Camila Carvalho	Brazil	7:32.49	
6	Jennieffer Zuñiga, Maria Samayoa	Guatemala	7:59.52	
