= Rowing at the 2002 Asian Games – Women's lightweight double sculls =

Women's lightweight double sculls at the 2002 Asian Games
- Venue: Nakdong River
- Date: 30 September – 3 October 2002
- Competitors: 20 from 10 nations

Medalists
gold medal	Xu Dongxiang; Wang Yanni	China
silver medal	Phuttharaksa Neegree; Bussayamas Phaengkathok	Thailand
bronze medal	Kahori Uchiyama; Yumi Uoshita	Japan

The women's lightweight double sculls competition at the 2002 Asian Games in Busan was held from 30 September to 3 October at the Nakdong River.

== Schedule ==
All times are Korea Standard Time (UTC+09:00)

Date	Time	Event
Monday, 30 September 2002	14:10	Heats
Tuesday, 1 October 2002	12:10	Repechages
Thursday, 3 October 2002	10:15	Finals

== Results ==
=== Heats ===
- Qualification: 1 → Final A (FA), 2–5 → Repechages (R)

==== Heat 1 ====
Rank	Team	Time	Notes
1	Japan (JPN); Kahori Uchiyama; Yumi Uoshita	7:41.48	FA
2	Thailand (THA); Phuttharaksa Neegree; Bussayamas Phaengkathok	7:46.34	R
3	Chinese Taipei (TPE); Lin Pei-yin; Lai Hung-wen	8:00.90	R
4	Hong Kong (HKG); Lee Ka Man; Fung Kwai Yuk	8:24.69	R
5	Sri Lanka (SRI); Minoli Gunawardena; Mithila Gunawardena	9:40.89	R

==== Heat 2 ====
Rank	Team	Time	Notes
1	China (CHN); Xu Dongxiang; Wang Yanni	7:57.74	FA
2	North Korea (PRK); Rim Kum-suk; Kwon Yu-ran	8:22.52	R
3	Indonesia (INA); Weni; Enggelina Ohello	8:33.65	R
4	South Korea (KOR); Choi Nam-soon; Kim Soon-duk	8:46.55	R
5	India (IND); Jincymol Verghese; Monalisa Mohanty	8:53.89	R

=== Repechages ===
- Qualification: 1–2 → Final A (FA), 3–5 → Final B (FB)

==== Repechage A ====
Rank	Team	Time	Notes
1	North Korea (PRK); Rim Kum-suk; Kwon Yu-ran	7:31.91	FA
2	Chinese Taipei (TPE); Lin Pei-yin; Lai Hung-wen	7:42.58	FA
3	South Korea (KOR); Choi Nam-soon; Kim Soon-duk	7:59.86	FB
4	Sri Lanka (SRI); Minoli Gunawardena; Mithila Gunawardena	9:04.68	FB

==== Repechage B ====
Rank	Team	Time	Notes
1	Thailand (THA); Phuttharaksa Neegree; Bussayamas Phaengkathok	7:34.10	FA
2	Indonesia (INA); Weni; Enggelina Ohello	7:47.05	FA
3	Hong Kong (HKG); Lee Ka Man; Fung Kwai Yuk	7:52.52	FB
4	India (IND); Jincymol Verghese; Monalisa Mohanty	8:10.81	FB

=== Finals ===
==== Final B ====
Rank	Team	Time
1	Hong Kong (HKG); Lee Ka Man; Fung Kwai Yuk	7:49.13
2	South Korea (KOR); Choi Nam-soon; Kim Soon-duk	8:01.54
3	India (IND); Jincymol Verghese; Monalisa Mohanty	8:05.07
4	Sri Lanka (SRI); Minoli Gunawardena; Mithila Gunawardena	8:46.82

==== Final A ====
Rank	Team	Time
1st place, gold medalist(s)	China (CHN); Xu Dongxiang; Wang Yanni	7:18.02
2nd place, silver medalist(s)	Thailand (THA); Phuttharaksa Neegree; Bussayamas Phaengkathok	7:22.76
3rd place, bronze medalist(s)	Japan (JPN); Kahori Uchiyama; Yumi Uoshita	7:25.67
4	North Korea (PRK); Rim Kum-suk; Kwon Yu-ran	7:34.02
5	Chinese Taipei (TPE); Lin Pei-yin; Lai Hung-wen	7:36.10
6	Indonesia (INA); Weni; Enggelina Ohello	7:39.69
