= Rowing at the 2010 Asian Games – Women's lightweight single sculls =

Women's lightweight single sculls at the 2010 Asian Games
- Venue: Guangzhou International Rowing Centre
- Date: 15–19 November 2010
- Competitors: 7 from 7 nations

Medalists
gold medal	Eri Wakai	Japan
silver medal	Ji Yoo-jin	South Korea
bronze medal	Bussayamas Phaengkathok	Thailand

The women's lightweight single sculls competition at the 2010 Asian Games in Guangzhou, China was held from 15 November to 19 November at the International Rowing Centre.

== Schedule ==
All times are China Standard Time (UTC+08:00)

Date	Time	Event
Monday, 15 November 2010	10:30	Heats
Wednesday, 17 November 2010	10:10	Repechage
Friday, 19 November 2010	10:35	Final

== Results ==
=== Heats ===
- Qualification: 1 → Final (FA), 2–4 → Repechage (R)

==== Heat 1 ====
Rank	Athlete	Time	Notes
1	Lee Ka Man (HKG)	7:55.19	FA
2	Ji Yoo-jin (KOR)	7:58.45	R
3	Alexandra Opachanova (KAZ)	8:03.68	R
4	Bussayamas Phaengkathok (THA)	8:33.72	R

==== Heat 2 ====
Rank	Athlete	Time	Notes
1	Eri Wakai (JPN)	7:52.13	FA
2	Nataliya Bogitova (UZB)	7:53.97	R
3	Kim Kyong-a (PRK)	7:57.36	R

=== Repechage ===
- Qualification: 1–4 → Final (FA)

Rank	Athlete	Time	Notes
1	Ji Yoo-jin (KOR)	7:55.43	FA
2	Alexandra Opachanova (KAZ)	7:56.47	FA
3	Bussayamas Phaengkathok (THA)	7:56.51	FA
4	Nataliya Bogitova (UZB)	7:57.02	FA
5	Kim Kyong-a (PRK)	7:58.78	

=== Final ===
Rank	Athlete	Time
1st place, gold medalist(s)	Eri Wakai (JPN)	7:51.37
2nd place, silver medalist(s)	Ji Yoo-jin (KOR)	7:56.15
3rd place, bronze medalist(s)	Bussayamas Phaengkathok (THA)	7:56.75
4	Alexandra Opachanova (KAZ)	7:58.56
5	Lee Ka Man (HKG)	7:58.65
6	Nataliya Bogitova (UZB)	8:05.05
