= Rowing at the 2006 Asian Games – Women's lightweight single sculls =

Women's lightweight single sculls at the 2006 Asian Games
- Venue: West Bay Lagoon
- Date: 3–7 December 2006
- Competitors: 10 from 10 nations

Medalists
gold medal	Xu Dongxiang	China
silver medal	Lee Ka Man	Hong Kong
bronze medal	Phuttharaksa Neegree	Thailand

The women's lightweight single sculls competition at the 2006 Asian Games in Doha was held from 3 December to 7 December at the West Bay Lagoon.

Since Doha was scarce of water the distance had to be shortened from standard 2000 meters to 1000 meters.

== Schedule ==
All times are Arabia Standard Time (UTC+03:00)

Date	Time	Event
Sunday, 3 December 2006	14:00	Heats
Monday, 4 December 2006	14:00	Repechage
Tuesday, 5 December 2006	14:20	Semifinals
Thursday, 7 December 2006	09:40	Finals

== Results ==
=== Heats ===
- Qualification: 1–2 → Semifinals A/B (SA/B), 3–4 → Repechage (R)

==== Heat 1 ====
Rank	Athlete	Time	Notes
1	Yuki Tamagawa (JPN)	5:07.43	SA/B
2	Lee Ka Man (HKG)	5:11.43	SA/B
3	Phuttharaksa Neegree (THA)	5:20.69	R
4	Ji Yoo-jin (KOR)	5:24.28	R

==== Heat 2 ====
Rank	Athlete	Time	Notes
1	Xu Dongxiang (CHN)	4:48.80	SA/B
2	Ro Kum-suk (PRK)	5:06.59	SA/B
3	Alexandra Opachanova (KAZ)	5:10.40	R

==== Heat 3 ====
Rank	Athlete	Time	Notes
1	Zarrina Ganieva (UZB)	5:27.48	SA/B
2	Elsie Lim (SIN)	6:11.92	SA/B
3	Alia Qali (KUW)	8:06.38	R

=== Repechage ===
- Qualification: 1–2 → Semifinals A/B (SA/B), 3–4 → Final C (FC)

Rank	Athlete	Time	Notes
1	Phuttharaksa Neegree (THA)	3:43.29	SA/B
2	Ji Yoo-jin (KOR)	3:45.42	SA/B
3	Alexandra Opachanova (KAZ)	3:45.67	FC
4	Alia Qali (KUW)	4:16.65	FC

=== Semifinals ===
- Qualification: 1–2 → Final A (FA), 3–4 → Final B (FB)

==== Semifinal A/B 1 ====
Rank	Athlete	Time	Notes
1	Xu Dongxiang (CHN)	3:30.80	FA
2	Phuttharaksa Neegree (THA)	3:35.42	FA
3	Yuki Tamagawa (JPN)	3:38.07	FB
4	Elsie Lim (SIN)	3:38.22	FB

==== Semifinal A/B 2 ====
Rank	Athlete	Time	Notes
1	Ro Kum-suk (PRK)	3:33.39	FA
2	Lee Ka Man (HKG)	3:35.48	FA
3	Zarrina Ganieva (UZB)	3:38.17	FB
4	Ji Yoo-jin (KOR)	3:44.96	FB

=== Finals ===
==== Final C ====
Rank	Athlete	Time
1	Alexandra Opachanova (KAZ)	4:26.67
2	Alia Qali (KUW)	4:58.68

==== Final B ====
Rank	Athlete	Time
1	Ji Yoo-jin (KOR)	4:21.80
2	Yuki Tamagawa (JPN)	4:26.53
3	Zarrina Ganieva (UZB)	4:35.65
4	Elsie Lim (SIN)	4:38.62

==== Final A ====
Rank	Athlete	Time
1st place, gold medalist(s)	Xu Dongxiang (CHN)	4:10.28
2nd place, silver medalist(s)	Lee Ka Man (HKG)	4:12.90
3rd place, bronze medalist(s)	Phuttharaksa Neegree (THA)	4:18.96
4	Ro Kum-suk (PRK)	4:59.03
