= Rowing at the 2010 South American Games – Women's lightweight single sculls =

The Women's lightweight single sculls event at the 2010 South American Games was held over March 21 at 10:00.

== Medalists ==
Gold	Silver	Bronze
Milka Kraljev; Argentina	Gabriela Mosqueira Benitez; Paraguay	Luciana Granato; Brazil

== Records ==
World Best Time
World best time	Constanța Burcică (ROU)	7:28.15	Paris, France	1994

== Results ==
Rank	Rowers	Country	Time
1st place, gold medalist(s)	Milka Kraljev	Argentina	8:15.00
2nd place, silver medalist(s)	Gabriela Mosqueira Benitez	Paraguay	8:17.53
3rd place, bronze medalist(s)	Luciana Granato	Brazil	8:30.31
4	Ivonne Renne Atero	Chile	8:41.58
5	Kimberlin Meneses	Venezuela	8:45.32
