= Róðrarfelagið Knørrur =

Faroese rowing club

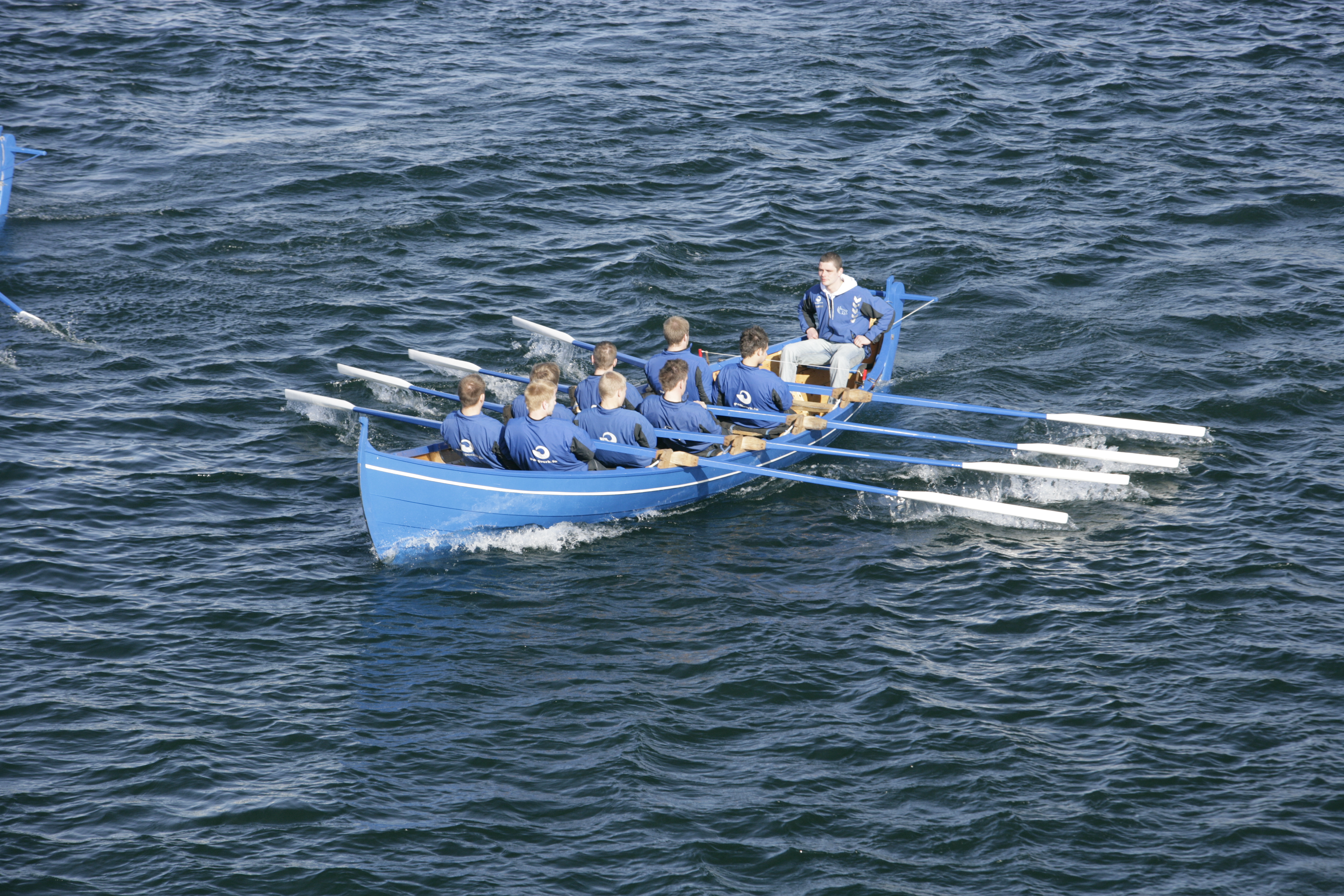
Knørrur, one of the boats of Róðrarfelagið Knørrur.

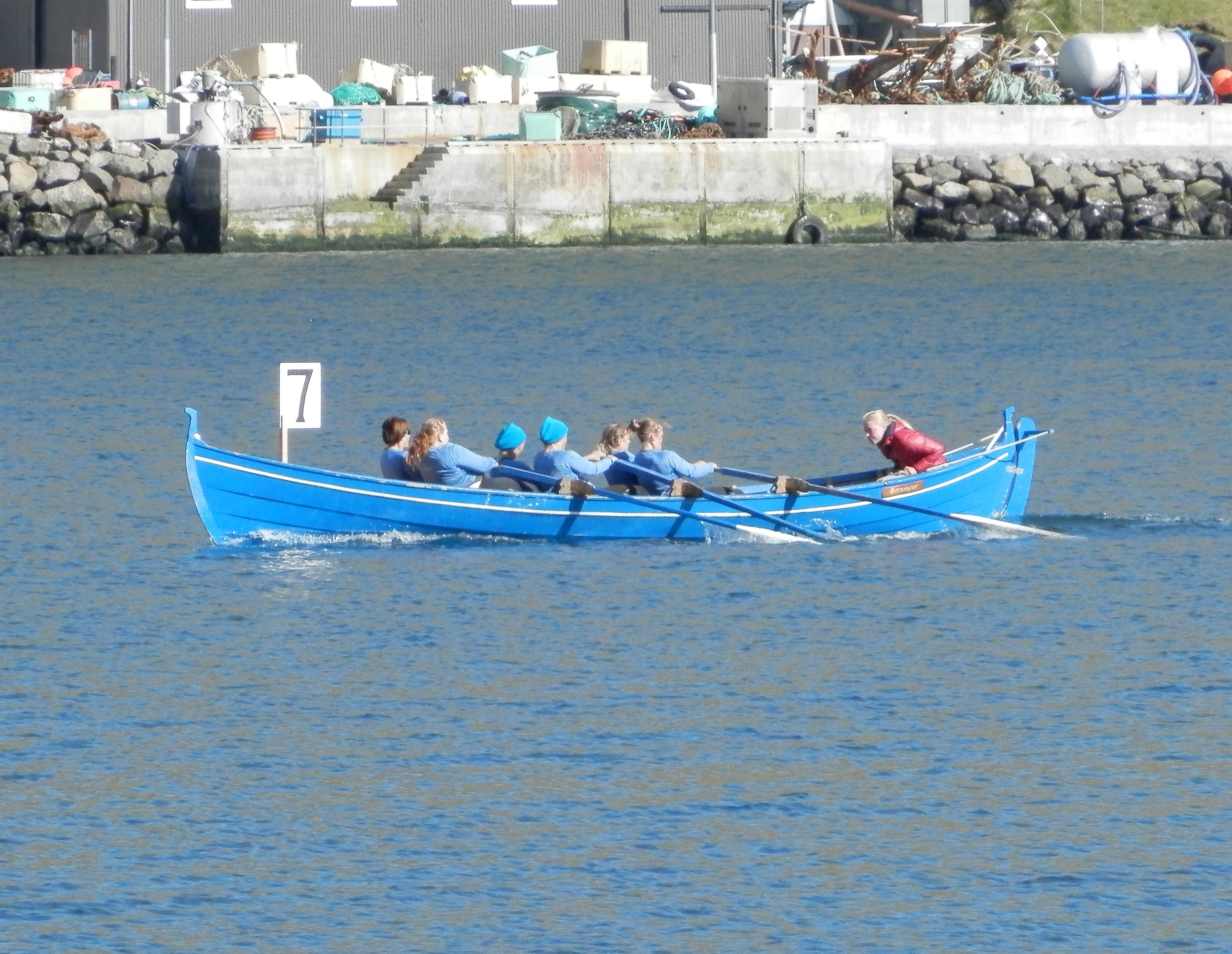
Herningur in 2012. One of the rowers was the Olympic rower Katrin Olsen.

Róðrarfelagið Knørrur is a Faroese rowing club in Tórshavn, which was founded on 28 February 1985. The club has its boat houses on Skálatrøð and Evensens pakkhús in Tórshavn. The boats compete in the rowing competitions which are held every summer around the islands. The row boats are blue with a white line around the top of the boat. All of the boats have names from the Faroese ballad Ormurin Langi. The boats of the row club has won several Faroese Championships. One of the former rowers of the club is Olympic rower Katrin Olsen, who became Faroese Champion with Róðrarfelagið Knørrur in 1997 and 1999, before she moved to Denmark. Later she became Danish champion in a different kind of rowing; in Denmark she was rowing in a lightweight double sculler. In 2008 she participated in the 2008 Summer Olympics together with Juliane Rasmussen, they ended up as number seven in the Women's lightweight double sculls. The Faroese word for boat race or rowing competition is Kappróður.

== Winner of the Faroese Championships in Rowing ==
The row club Knørrur has won several Faroese Championships since the club was founded in 1985.

Jallurin, a 5-mannafar boat, has won 2 Faroese Championships. One in 2011 in the category for boys under 18, and one in 2017 in the category for women over 18. Tambar, also a 5-mannafar boat, has won 1 Faroese Championship. They won in the category for women over 18 in 2018. The boat Jarnbardur has won 16 Faroese Championships in the category for women in 6-mannafar boats, they won in 1991, 1992, 1993, 1997, 1999, 2000, 2002, 2004, 2005, 2007, 2008, 2013, 2014, 2015, 2020 and 2021. Jarnbardur (women 6-mannafar) is the most winning boat in the category "Women 6-mannafør" in the Faroese rowing competitions. Jarnbardur has also won 1 Faroese Championship in the category '6-mannafør men'. They won in 2013. Knørrur won already the first year in 1985. Knørrur has won the Faroese Championship in the category 8-mannafør men four times, in 1985, 1989, 1990 and 2006. Ormurin Langi has won 3 Faroese Championships in the category 10-mannafør men, they won in 2018, 2019 and 2020.

There are rowing competitions held around the islands every summer in village festivals. The boats who win most points after the final boat race, which is held on 28 July in Tórshavn at the Ólavsøka boat race, win the Faroese championship (FM).

== The Row Boats of Knørrur ==
Knørrur Row Club owns ten boats:

- Jallurin, 5-mannafar, built in 2011 by Sámal Hansen, boat builder. The former boat was built in 2006, also by Hansen, and is now called Pílur.
- Tambar, 5-mannafar, built in 2018 by Terji Reinert Jakobsen, boat builder. The former boat, built in 2008 by Kaj Hammer, boat builder, was sold in 2014.
- Pílur, 5-mannafar, previous Jallurin, built in 2006 by Sámal Hansen, boat builder.
- Jarnbardur, 6-mannafar, built in 2002 by Sámal Hansen, boat builder. The former Jarnbardur was built in 1990 by Hanus Jensen, boat builder, and is now called Silkisegl (Silk Sails).
- Herningur, 6-mannafar, the boat was built in 2009 by Sámal Hansen.
- Knørrur, 8-mannafar, built in 2000 by Sámal Hansen, boat builder. The former boat was built in 1974 by Niclas í Koltri, boat builder.
- Ormurin Langi, 10-mannafar, built in 2018 by Sámal Hansen, boat builder.
- Kongurin, 10-mannafar, previous Ormurin Langi, built in 2008 by Sámal Hansen, boat builder.

In addition, the club has two boats, which are not used for competition:

- Úlvur, a small boat called 'tristur', used by young children to practice rowing, built in 2009 by Kaj Hammer, boat builder.
- Silkisegl, 6-mannafar, the first Jarnbardur, built in 1990 by Hanus Jensen, boat builder.

== The Board of Róðrarfelagið Knørrur ==
- Jógvan Elias Jakobsen, Chairman
- Eivy Olsen, Vice chairman
- Rógvi Andrias Fossádal, Chief financial officer
- Ernst Olsen, Secretary

== Photo gallery ==
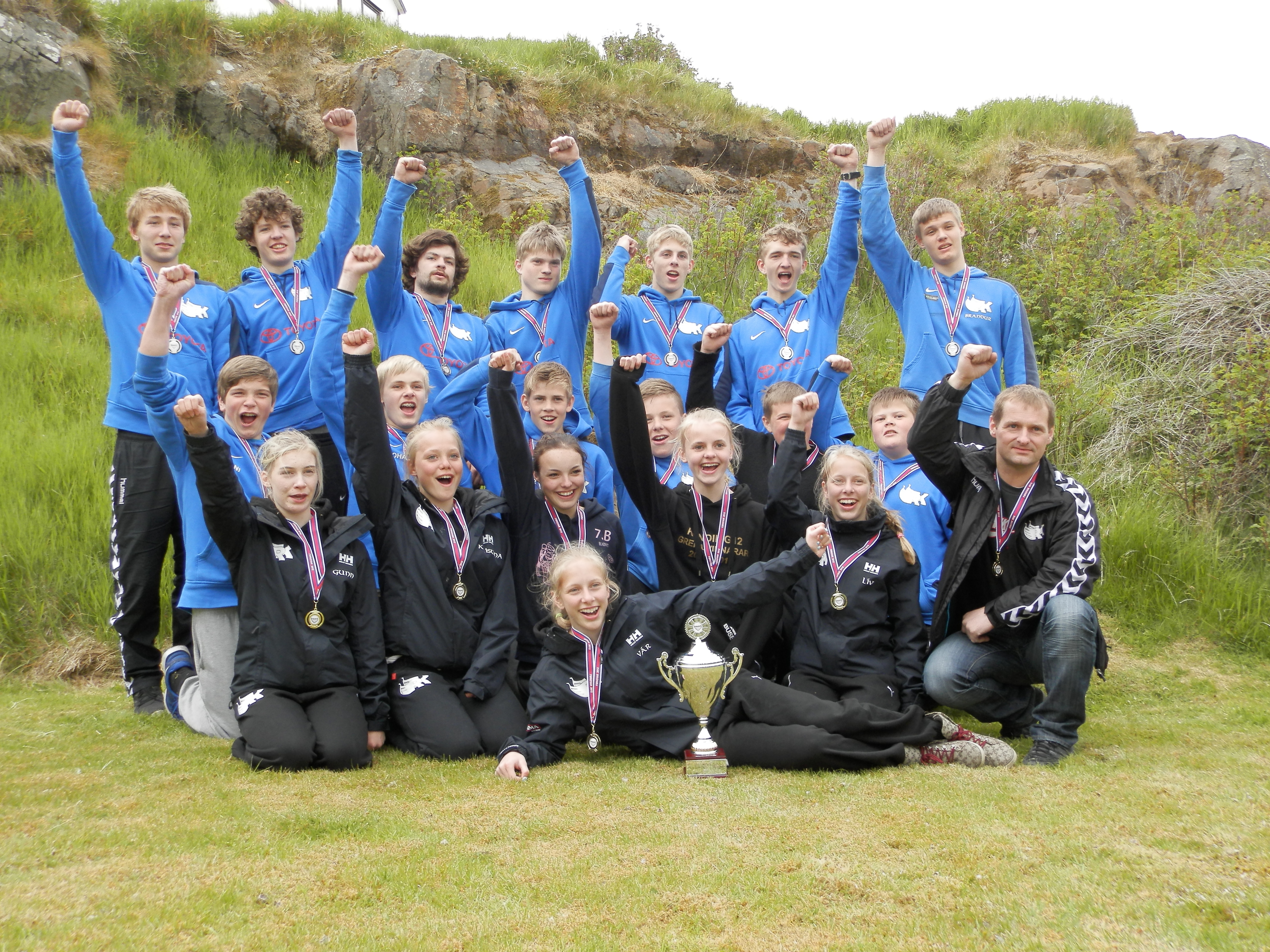
Three crews from Róðrarfelagið Knørrur on Jóansøka 2012. Jallurin, boys under 18, Pílur, boys under 15 and Jallurin, girls under 15.

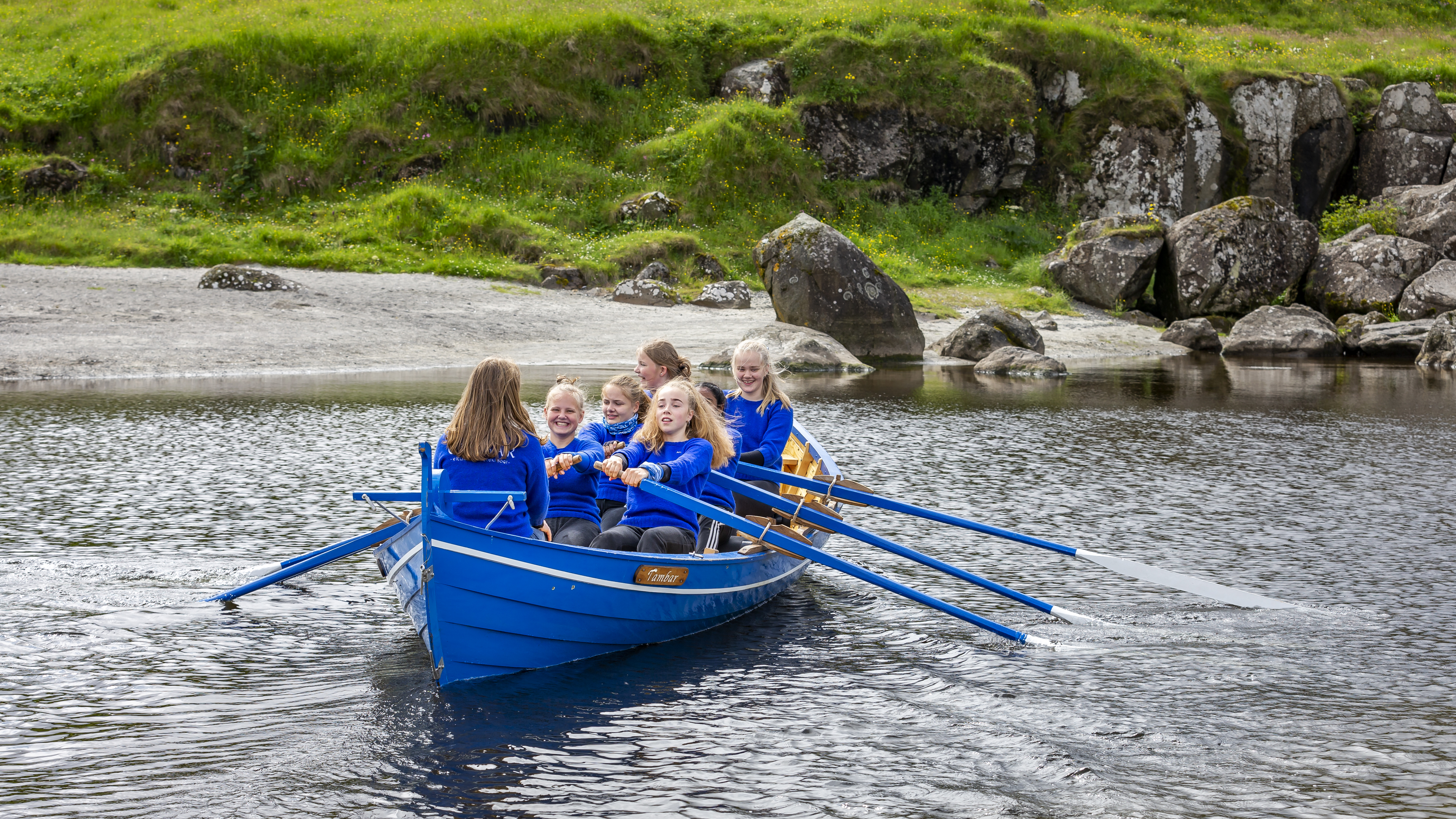
Tambar, girls under 15 (children's rowing). Photo by Ólavur Frederiksen, July 21, 2019.

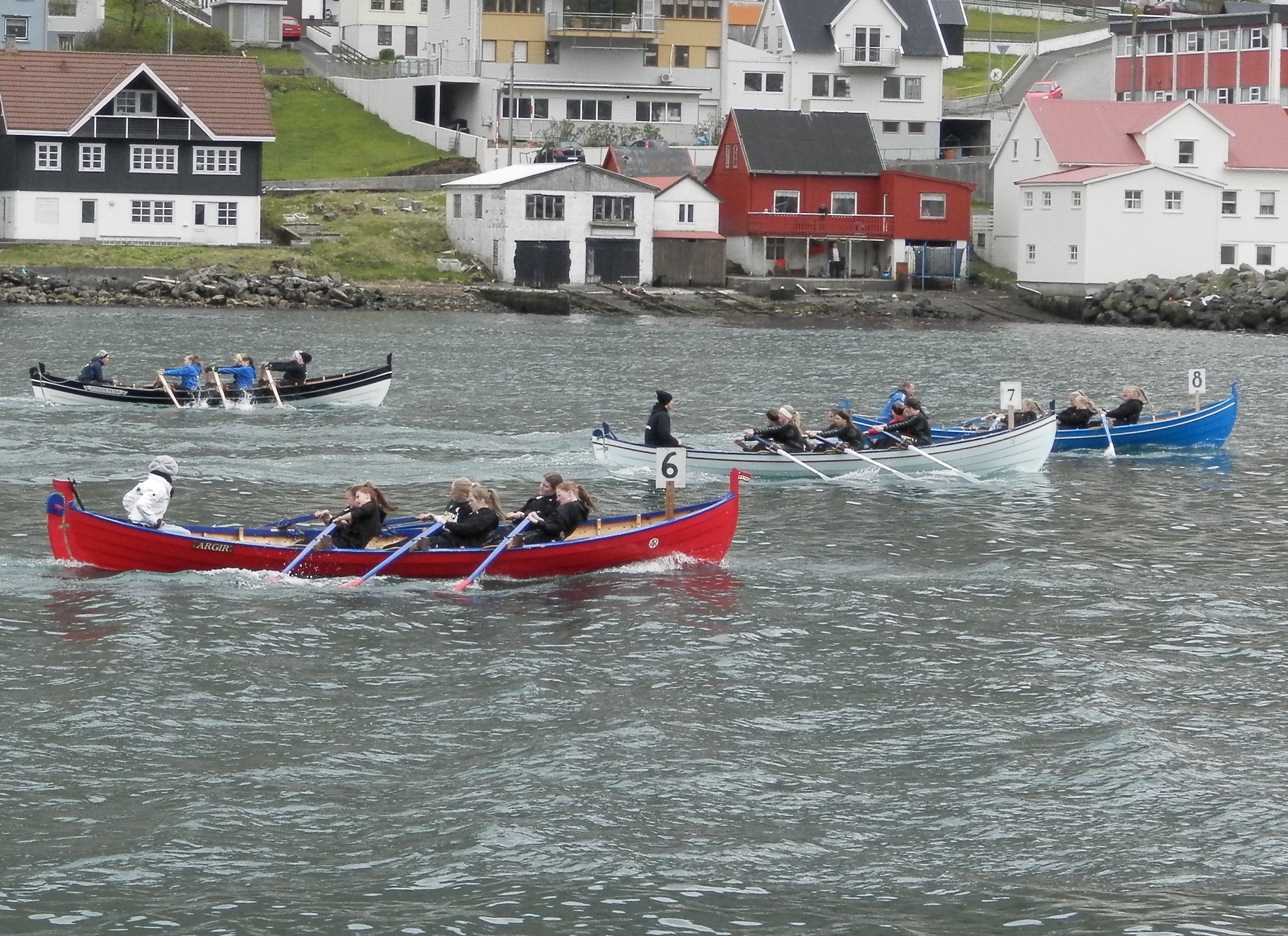
Children's rowing race for girls under 15, Norðoyastevna 2012. Jallurin won the race.

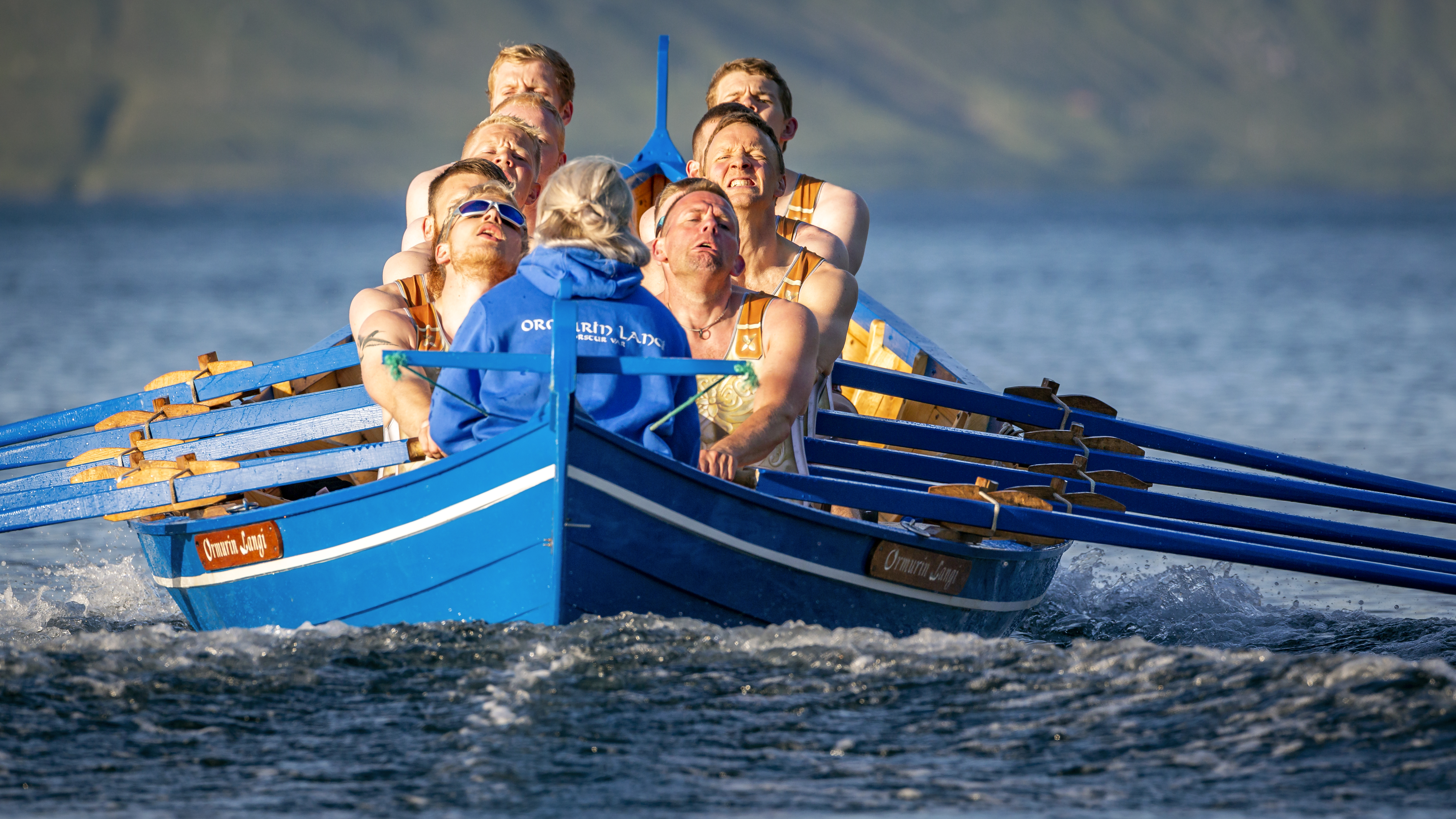
Ormurin Langi, practicing for the next leg of competition in the fjord of Kollafjørður. Photo by Ólavur Frederiksen, June 26, 2019.

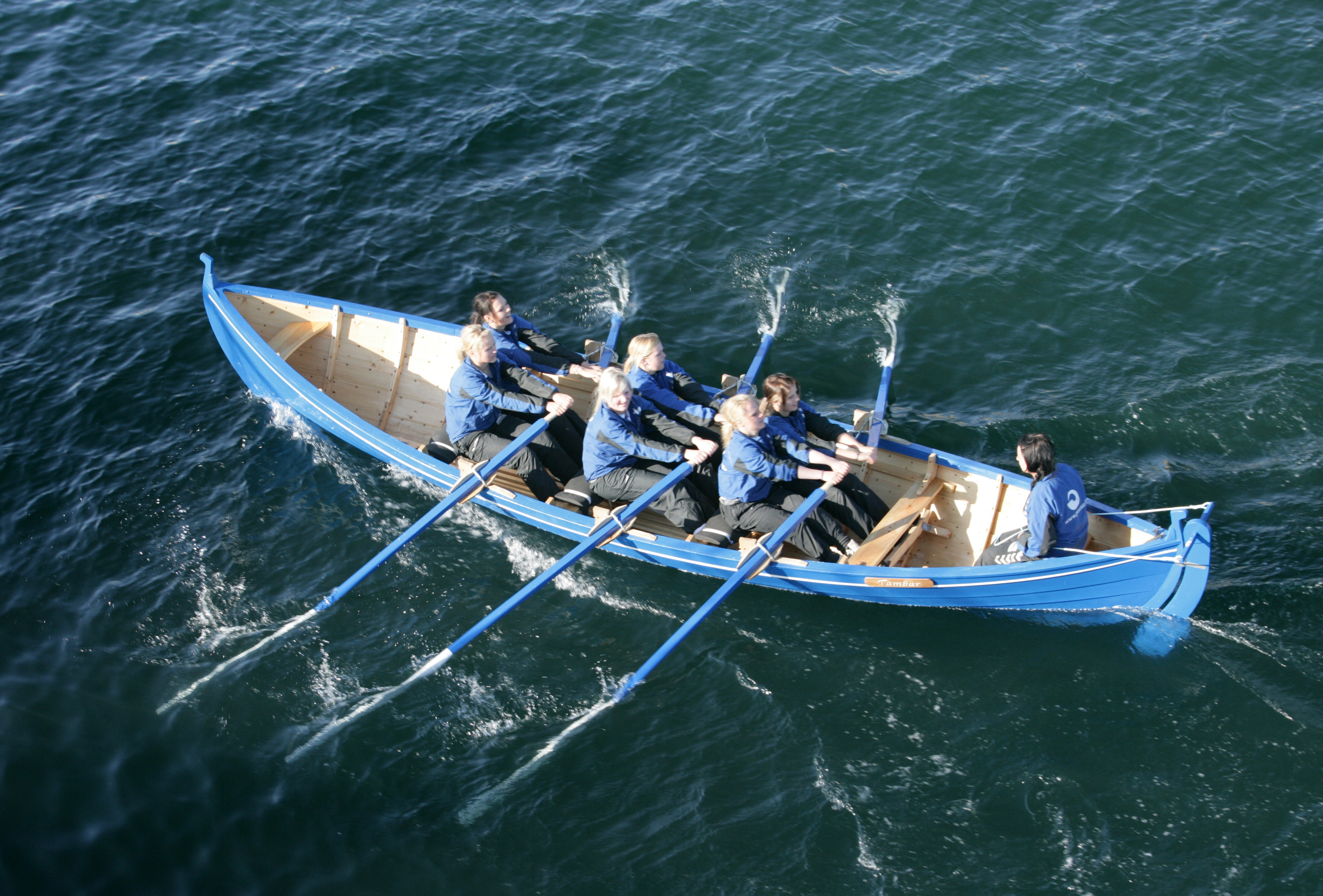
Tambar
