= Rowing at the 2010 South American Games – Women's lightweight double sculls =

The Women's lightweight double sculls event at the 2010 South American Games was held over March 22 at 10:20.

== Medalists ==
Gold	Silver	Bronze
Milka Kraljev; Clara Rohner; Argentina	Camila Carvalho; Luciana Granato; Brazil	Joselin Izaze; Kimberlin Meneses; Venezuela

== Records ==
World Best Time
World best time	China	6:49.77	Poznań, Poland	2006

== Results ==
Rank	Rowers	Country	Time
1st place, gold medalist(s)	Milka Kraljev, Clara Rohner	Argentina	7:29.33
2nd place, silver medalist(s)	Camila Carvalho, Luciana Granato	Brazil	7:30.22
3rd place, bronze medalist(s)	Joselin Izaze, Kimberlin Meneses	Venezuela	7:38.65
4	Daniela Johanna Hernandez, Ivonne Renne Atero	Chile	7:43.87
5	Geovanna Guerrero, Katherine Suarez	Ecuador	8:39.34
