= Finland at the 2008 Summer Olympics =

- IOC code: FIN
- NOC: Finnish Olympic Committee
- Website: sport.fi/olympiakomitea (in Finnish and Swedish)

in Beijing
- Competitors: 58 in 13 sports
- Flag bearers: Juha Hirvi (opening); Tero Pitkämäki (closing)
- Medals Ranked 44th: Gold 1 Silver 1 Bronze 2 Total 4

Summer Olympics appearances (overview)
- 1908; 1912; 1920; 1924; 1928; 1932; 1936; 1948; 1952; 1956; 1960; 1964; 1968; 1972; 1976; 1980; 1984; 1988; 1992; 1996; 2000; 2004; 2008; 2012; 2016; 2020; 2024

Other related appearances
- 1906 Intercalated Games

Finland competed at the 2008 Summer Olympics in Beijing, People's Republic of China. The athletes were named in four selections: first took place on December 19, 2007, 2nd on April 16, 3rd on May 20 and 4th on July 21, 2008.

The goal of the Finnish Olympic team in the Beijing 2008 Olympic Games was three medals with at least one gold medal.

Shooter Juha Hirvi and dressage rider Kyra Kyrklund made Finnish olympic history by participating in their sixth Olympic Games. They shared the record with three winter Olympians: cross-country skiers Marja-Liisa Kirvesniemi and Harri Kirvesniemi and ice hockey player Raimo Helminen.

== Medalists ==
Medal	Name	Sport	Event	Date
Gold	Satu Mäkelä-Nummela	Shooting	Women's trap	August 11
Silver	Minna Nieminen; Sanna Stén	Rowing	Women's lightweight double sculls	August 17
Bronze	Henri Häkkinen	Shooting	Men's 10 m air rifle	August 11
Bronze	Tero Pitkämäki	Athletics	Men's javelin throw	August 23

Notes

- Satu Mäkelä-Nummela's victory in women's trap was Finland's first ever gold medal in shotgun events at the Olympic Games. She became the third Finnish female athlete to win gold at the Summer Olympics, after Sylvi Saimo and Heli Rantanen.
- Minna Nieminen's and Sanna Stén's silver medal in lightweight double sculls is Finland's first Olympic medal in rowing since 1984, when Pertti Karppinen won the last of his three consecutive Olympic gold medals.

== Archery ==
Athlete	Event	Ranking round		Round of 64	Round of 32	Round of 16	Quarterfinals	Semifinals	Final / BM	
Athlete	Event	Score	Seed	Opposition Score	Opposition Score	Opposition Score	Opposition Score	Opposition Score	Opposition Score	Rank
Matti Hatava	Men's individual	619	58	Terry (GBR); W 105–104	Cheng C S (MAS); L 103–110	Did not advance				

== Athletics ==
Key

- Note–Ranks given for track events are within the athlete's heat only
- Q = Qualified for the next round
- q = Qualified for the next round as a fastest loser or, in field events, by position without achieving the qualifying target
- NR = National record
- N/A = Round not applicable for the event
- Bye = Athlete not required to compete in round

Men
Track & road events

Athlete	Event	Heat		Quarterfinal		Semifinal		Final	
Athlete	Event	Result	Rank	Result	Rank	Result	Rank	Result	Rank
Janne Holmén	Marathon	—						2:14:44	19
Visa Hongisto	200 m	20.62	4 q	20.76	6	Did not advance			
Antti Kempas	50 km walk	—						3:55:19	20
Jarkko Kinnunen	50 km walk	—						3:52:25	15
Francis Kirwa	Marathon	—						2:14:22	17
Mikko Lahtio	800 m	1:47.20	8	—		Did not advance			

Field events

Athlete	Event	Qualification		Final	
Athlete	Event	Distance	Position	Distance	Position
Tommi Evilä	Long jump	7.88	=17	Did not advance	
Robert Häggblom	Shot put	NM	—	Did not advance	
Tero Järvenpää	Javelin throw	82.34	4 q	83.95	4
Olli-Pekka Karjalainen	Hammer throw	77.07	8 q	79.59	6
Frantz Kruger	Discus throw	62.48	12 q	61.98	11
Mikko Latvala	Pole vault	5.45	=22	Did not advance	
Tero Pitkämäki	Javelin throw	82.61	3 Q	86.16	3rd place, bronze medalist(s)
Teemu Wirkkala	Javelin throw	79.79	10 q	83.46	5

Combined events – Decathlon

Athlete	Event	100 m	LJ	SP	HJ	400 m	110H	DT	PV	JT	1500 m	Final	Rank
Mikko Halvari	Result	11.18	6.88	13.72	1.93	50.60	16.25	47.71	NM	55.11	5:20.26	6486	25
Mikko Halvari	Points	821	785	711	740	787	705	823	0	665	449	6486	25

Women
Field events

Athlete	Event	Qualification		Final	
Athlete	Event	Distance	Position	Distance	Position
Mikaela Ingberg	Javelin throw	58.82	17	Did not advance	
Merja Korpela	Hammer throw	66.29	30	Did not advance	
Vanessa Vandy	Pole vault	4.00	=32	Did not advance	

Combined events – Heptathlon

Athlete	Event	100H	HJ	SP	200 m	LJ	JT	800 m	Final	Rank
Niina Kelo	Result	13.95	1.65	14.82	25.90	5.76	51.48	2:20.97	5911	23*
Niina Kelo	Points	985	795	849	806	777	889	810	5911	23*

* The athlete who finished in second place, Lyudmila Blonska of Ukraine, tested positive for a banned substance. Both the A and the B tests were positive, therefore Blonska was stripped of her silver medal, and Kelo moved up a position.

== Badminton ==
Athlete	Event	Round of 64	Round of 32	Round of 16	Quarterfinal	Semifinal	Final / BM	
Athlete	Event	Opposition Score	Opposition Score	Opposition Score	Opposition Score	Opposition Score	Opposition Score	Rank
Ville Lång	Men's singles	Druzchenko (UKR); W 21–12, 21–19	Rai (USA); W 21–9, 21–16	Kuncoro (INA); L 13–21, 18–21	Did not advance			
Anu Nieminen	Women's singles	Bye	Xu Hw (GER); L 17–21, 8–21	Did not advance				

== Canoeing ==
=== Sprint ===
Athlete	Event	Heats		Semifinals		Final	
Athlete	Event	Time	Rank	Time	Rank	Time	Rank
Mika Hokajärvi; Kalle Mikkonen	Men's K-2 500 m	1:33.785	7 QS	1:34.994	8	Did not advance	
Mika Hokajärvi; Kalle Mikkonen	Men's K-2 1000 m	3:23.475	6 QS	3:27.018	6	Did not advance	
Anne Rikala	Women's K-1 500 m	1:54.294	7 QS	1:54.025	4	Did not advance	
Jenni Mikkonen; Anne Rikala	Women's K-2 500 m	1:45.735	4 QS	1:44.624	2 Q	1:44.176	7

Qualification Legend: QS = Qualify to semi-final; QF = Qualify directly to final

== Diving ==
Athlete	Events	Preliminaries		Semifinal		Final	
Athlete	Events	Points	Rank	Points	Rank	Points	Rank
Joona Puhakka	3 m springboard	469.45	5 Q	451.95	13	Did not advance	

== Equestrian ==
=== Dressage ===
Athlete	Horse	Event	Grand Prix		Grand Prix Special		Grand Prix Freestyle		Overall	
Athlete	Horse	Event	Score	Rank	Score	Rank	Score	Rank	Score	Rank
Kyra Kyrklund	Max	Individual	70.583	6 Q	69.720	10 Q	74.250	6	71.985	8

== Judo ==
Athlete	Event	Round of 32	Round of 16	Quarterfinals	Semifinals	Repechage 1	Repechage 2	Repechage 3	Final / BM	
Athlete	Event	Opposition Result	Opposition Result	Opposition Result	Opposition Result	Opposition Result	Opposition Result	Opposition Result	Opposition Result	Rank
Nina Koivumäki	Women's −57 kg	Bye	Xu Y (CHN); L 0000–0020	Did not advance		Latrous (ALG); W 0001–0000	Sato (JPN); L 0000–1011	Did not advance		
Johanna Ylinen	Women's −63 kg	Wang C-F (TPE); L 0000–1011	Did not advance							

== Rowing ==
Women

Athlete	Event	Heats		Repechage		Semifinals		Final	
Athlete	Event	Time	Rank	Time	Rank	Time	Rank	Time	Rank
Minna Nieminen; Sanna Stén	Lightweight double sculls	6:56.61	4 R	7:23.80	2 SA/B	7:03.91	2 FA	6:56.03	2nd place, silver medalist(s)

Qualification Legend: FA=Final A (medal); FB=Final B (non-medal); FC=Final C (non-medal); FD=Final D (non-medal); FE=Final E (non-medal); FF=Final F (non-medal); SA/B=Semifinals A/B; SC/D=Semifinals C/D; SE/F=Semifinals E/F; QF=Quarterfinals; R=Repechage

== Sailing ==
Men

Athlete	Event	Race											Net points	Final rank
Athlete	Event	1	2	3	4	5	6	7	8	9	10	M*	Net points	Final rank
Pierre Collura	Laser	25	10	18	~~41~~	23	25	20	33	DNF	CAN	EL	198	30
Heikki Elomaa; Niklas Lindgren	470	28	22	27	~~DSQ~~	25	19	14	23	17	21	EL	196	27

Women

Athlete	Event	Race											Net points	Final rank
Athlete	Event	1	2	3	4	5	6	7	8	9	10	M*	Net points	Final rank
Tuuli Petäjä	RS:X	14	11	7	~~16~~	16	16	12	16	11	14	EL	117	16
Tuula Tenkanen	Laser Radial	10	16	~~25~~	21	17	20	20	9	15	CAN	EL	128	22
Silja Lehtinen; Maria Klemetz; Livia Väresmaa	Yngling	6	6	3	8	10	~~OCS~~	15	12	CAN	CAN	EL	60	11

Open

Athlete	Event	Race											Net points	Final rank
Athlete	Event	1	2	3	4	5	6	7	8	9	10	M*	Net points	Final rank
Tapio Nirkko	Finn	18	9	9	9	19	~~22~~	16	22	CAN	CAN	EL	102	18

M = Medal race; EL = Eliminated – did not advance into the medal race; CAN = Race cancelled;

== Shooting ==
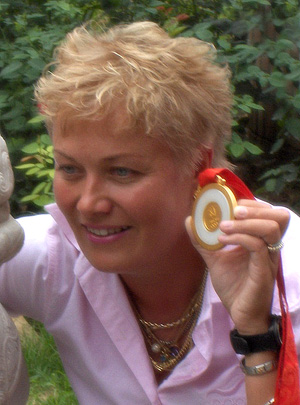
Satu Mäkelä-Nummela with olympic gold medal

Men

Athlete	Event	Qualification		Final	
Athlete	Event	Points	Rank	Points	Rank
Henri Häkkinen	10 m air rifle	598	1 Q	699.4	3rd place, bronze medalist(s)
Henri Häkkinen	50 m rifle prone	586	47	Did not advance	
Henri Häkkinen	50 m rifle 3 positions	1161	28	Did not advance	
Juha Hirvi	50 m rifle prone	595	5 Q	698.5	7
Juha Hirvi	50 m rifle 3 positions	1168	12	Did not advance	
Kai Jahnsson	10 m air pistol	574	30	Did not advance	
Kai Jahnsson	50 m pistol	553	22	Did not advance	

Women

Athlete	Event	Qualification		Final	
Athlete	Event	Points	Rank	Points	Rank
Hanna Etula	50 m rifle 3 positions	577	24	Did not advance	
Hanna Etula	10 m air rifle	394	21	Did not advance	
Marjut Heinonen	Skeet	61	17	Did not advance	
Mira Nevansuu	10 m air pistol	384	8 Q	480.5	7
Satu Mäkelä-Nummela	Trap	70	2 Q	91 OR	1st place, gold medalist(s)
Marjo Yli-Kiikka	50 m rifle 3 positions	579	14	Did not advance	
Marjo Yli-Kiikka	10 m air rifle	389	38	Did not advance	

== Swimming ==
Men

Athlete	Event	Heat		Semifinal		Final	
Athlete	Event	Time	Rank	Time	Rank	Time	Rank
Matti Rajakylä	50 m freestyle	22.48 NR	29	Did not advance			
Matti Rajakylä	100 m freestyle	49.91	41	Did not advance			

Women

Athlete	Event	Heat		Semifinal		Final	
Athlete	Event	Time	Rank	Time	Rank	Time	Rank
Noora Laukkanen	200 m breaststroke	2:38.97	39	Did not advance			
Eva Lehtonen	400 m freestyle	4:20.07	35	—		Did not advance	
Eva Lehtonen	800 m freestyle	8:53.50	33	—		Did not advance	
Emilia Pikkarainen	100 m butterfly	1:02.31	46	Did not advance			
Hanna-Maria Seppälä	50 m freestyle	25.06	15 Q	25.19	16	Did not advance	
Hanna-Maria Seppälä	100 m freestyle	53.60 NR	1 Q	53.84	=3 Q	53.97	4
Hanna-Maria Seppälä	100 m backstroke	1:02.39	30	Did not advance			

== Tennis ==
Men

Athlete	Event	Round of 64	Round of 32	Round of 16	Quarterfinals	Semifinals	Final / BM	
Athlete	Event	Opposition Score	Opposition Score	Opposition Score	Opposition Score	Opposition Score	Opposition Score	Rank
Jarkko Nieminen	Men's singles	Johansson (SWE); L 6–4, 4–6, 4–6	Did not advance					

== Weightlifting ==
Athlete	Event	Snatch		Clean & Jerk		Total	Rank
Athlete	Event	Result	Rank	Result	Rank	Total	Rank
Antti Everi	Men's +105 kg	171	10	195	11	366	11

== Wrestling ==
Key:

- VT - Victory by Fall.
- PP - Decision by Points - the loser with technical points.
- PO - Decision by Points - the loser without technical points.

Men's Greco-Roman

Athlete	Event	Qualification	Round of 16	Quarterfinal	Semifinal	Repechage 1	Repechage 2	Final / BM	
Athlete	Event	Opposition Result	Opposition Result	Opposition Result	Opposition Result	Opposition Result	Opposition Result	Opposition Result	Rank
Jarkko Ala-Huikku	−60 kg	Bye	Tyumenbayev (KGZ); L 1–3 ^{PP}	Did not advance					18

== See also ==
- Finland at the 2008 Summer Paralympics
