= Huayu (disambiguation) =

Huayu (华语) is an alternative name for the Chinese language, sometimes specifically referring to Standard Chinese, and is used in parts of Southeast Asia.

Huayu may also refer to:

- Huayu, Shanxi (化峪), a town in Jishan County, Shanxi, China
- Huayu, Shandong (化雨), a town in Jinxiang County, Shandong, China
- Singaporean Mandarin (新加坡华语), a variety of Mandarin Chinese widely spoken in Singapore

== See also ==
- Hua Yu (disambiguation)
