= Li Qian =

Li Qian may refer to:

- Li Qian (politician) (born 1960), Chinese politician
- Li Qian (actress) (born 1984), Chinese actress
- Li Qian (rower) (born 1985), Chinese Olympic rower
- Li Qian (Polish table tennis player) (born 1986), Chinese-Polish table tennis player
- Li Qian (Paralympian), Chinese para table tennis player
- Li Qian (boxer) (born 1990), Chinese boxer

== See also ==
- Liqian, village in Gansu, China
- Li Qiang (disambiguation)
