= Hua Yu =

Hua Yu may refer to:

- Standard Chinese, known as "Hua Yu" in parts of Southeast Asia
- Yu Hua (born 1960), Chinese writer
- Yu Hua (rower) (born 1981), Chinese rower

== See also ==
- Huayu (disambiguation)
