= Viehoff =

Viehoff is a relatively uncommon surname of German origin. It derives as vieh (German: cattle, livestock) + hof (German: enclosed courtyard), compare the Viehhof former cattle market square in Munich, but it could also refer to a farm with an enclosed yard. It occurs as the name of a chain of dispensing opticians centred on the North Rhine-Westphalia region of Germany, which Dutch genealogies suggest is the originating region of the family. The name occurs with some frequency in the Netherlands, having been established there since the late 18th or early 19th century. Notable people with the surname include:

- Phili Viehoff (1924–2015), Dutch politician
- Valerie Viehoff (born 1976), German rower
