= Sarah Garner =

American rower (born 1971)

Medal record

Women's rowing

Representing United States

Olympic Games
| Bronze medal – third place | 2000 Sydney | Lightweight double sculls |

World Rowing Championships
| Gold medal – first place | 1997 Aiguebelette | Lightweight single sculls |
| Gold medal – first place | 1998 Cologne | Lightweight double sculls |
| Silver medal – second place | 1999 St. Catharines | Lightweight double sculls |

Sarah Garner (born May 21, 1971) is an American rower and Olympic bronze medalist.

== Life and education ==
Garner hails from Madison, Wisconsin. She graduated from the University of Pennsylvania in 1994.

== Achievements ==
In 1997, Garner won the gold medal in women's single lightweight sculls at World Rowing Championships and was awarded USRowing's female Athlete of the Year.

She won a bronze medal at the 2000 Olympics in woman's lightweight double sculls with teammate Christine Collins with a time of 7:06.37.
