= Tracy Langlands =

British rower

Medal record

Women's rowing

Representing United Kingdom

World Rowing Championships
Bronze medal – third place	2002 Seville	LW2x

Tracy Langlands (born 26 April 1970 in Lincoln, England) is a British rower. Langlands won the bronze medal in the Lightweight Women's Double Sculls at the 2002 World Championships. She competed in the same event with Helen Casey at the 2004 Olympics.
