= Natalya Voronova =

Natalya Voronova may refer to:

- Natalya Pomoshchnikova-Voronova (born 1965), Russian sprinter
- Natalya Voronova (rower) (born 1986), Kazakhstani rower
