= Blasberg =

Blasberg is a German surname. Notable people with the surname include:

- Claudia Blasberg (born 1975), German rower
- Derek Blasberg (born 1982), American journalist
- Erica Blasberg (1984–2010), American golfer
- Kurt Blasberg (1902–1967), German soldier
