= Hester Goodsell =

British rower

Personal information
- Full name: Hester Sophia Goodsell
- Nationality: United Kingdom
- Born: 27 June 1984 (age 42) Camden, England
- Education: Music at University of York
- Occupation: Student
- Height: 5 ft 9 in (175 cm)
- Weight: 59 kg (130 lb)

Sport
- Country: Great Britain
- Sport: Rowing
- Event: Double sculls
- Club: Imperial College Boat Club
- Turned pro: 2005
- Partner: Sophie Hosking
- Former partner: Helen Casey
- Coached by: Paul Reedy
Medal record
Representing Great Britain
Women's rowing
World Championships
Bronze medal – third place	2005 Gifu	LW4x
Bronze medal – third place	2006 Eton	LW4x
Bronze medal – third place	2009 Poznan	LW2x
Bronze medal – third place	2011 Bled	LW2x

Hester Goodsell (born 27 June 1984) is a British rower and music teacher.

== Rowing career ==
Goodsell rowed in the Women's Lightweight Double Sculls at the 2008 Summer Olympics.

She was part of the British squad that topped the medal table at the 2011 World Rowing Championships in Bled, where she won a bronze medal as part of the lightweight double sculls with Sophie Hosking.

== Personal life ==
She graduated in music from the University of York. Until 2010, she was Director of Music at the Elvian School in Reading, Berkshire. She is now Director of Music at Notting Hill and Ealing High School in West London.
