= The Amsterdam Sports Award =

The Amsterdam Sports Award is an award designed by Jos Wong Lun Hing who was born in Roermond, Netherlands. The award which has been around since 1992 is issued by the municipality to the winner or the most valuable member of a leading international professional sport event in Amsterdam.

The award are handed out up to a maximum of five times a year. Among the award winners are World and Olympic Champions. The Amsterdam Sports Award was previously presented to great athletes like Alina Kozich (2004), Haile Gebrselassie (2005), Anky van Grunsven, Edwin van der Sar (2006), IJsbrand Chardon and Kamiel Maase (2007).

== See also ==
- Amsterdam Sportsman of the year
