= Alex White (rower) =

South African rower (born 1983)

Personal information
- Nationality: South African
- Born: 7 October 1983 (age 41)

Sport
- Sport: Rowing

Alex White (born 7 October 1983) is a South African rower. She competed in the women's lightweight double sculls event at the 2008 Summer Olympics.
