= Misaki Kumakura =

Japanese rower (born 1983)

Personal information
- Nationality: Japanese
- Born: 29 March 1983 (age 42); Okegawa, Japan

Sport
- Sport: Rowing

Misaki Kumakura (熊倉 美咲, Kumakura Misaki, born 29 March 1983) is a Japanese rower. She competed in the women's lightweight double sculls event at the 2008 Summer Olympics.
