= Ko Young-eun =

South Korean rower (born 1987)

Personal information
- Nationality: South Korean
- Born: 1 March 1987 (age 38)

Sport
- Sport: Rowing

Ko Young-eun (born 1 March 1987) is a South Korean rower. She competed in the women's lightweight double sculls event at the 2008 Summer Olympics.
