= Im Jin-myeong =

South Korean rower

Personal information
- Nationality: South Korean
- Born: 2 August 1980 (age 44)

Sport
- Sport: Rowing

Im Jin-myeong (born 2 August 1980) is a South Korean rower. She competed in the women's lightweight double sculls event at the 2000 Summer Olympics.
