= Li Qiang (disambiguation) =

Li Qiang (born 1959) is the premier of the People's Republic of China, former Communist party secretary of Shanghai and a member of the Politburo.

Li Qiang may also refer to:

== Officeholders ==
- Li Qiang (revolutionary) (1905–1996), former Chinese Minister of Foreign Trade, revolutionary, military engineer, secret agent, radio scientist, and politician
- Li Qiang (Lianyungang) (born 1955), former party secretary of Lianyungang City in Jiangsu, dismissed for corruption in 2014

== Sportspeople ==
- Li Qiang (athlete) (born 1975), Chinese Paralympic athlete
- Li Qiang (canoeist) (born 1989), Chinese flatwater canoeist
- Li Qiang (footballer) (born 1998), Chinese footballer

== Others ==
- Li Qiang (screenwriter) (born 1968), Chinese screenwriter
- Li Qiang (activist) (born 1972), Chinese labor activist
- Li Yixiang (born 1973), also known as Li Qiang, Chinese actor

== See also ==
- Li Qian (disambiguation)
