= Daniela Reimer =

German rower

Medal record

Women's rowing

Representing Germany

Olympic Games
Silver medal – second place	2004 Athens	LW2x

World Championships
Gold medal – first place	2005 Kaizu	LW2x
Gold medal – first place	2010 Karapiro	LW4x
Silver medal – second place	2010 Karapiro	LW2x

Daniela Reimer (born 26 September 1982 in Potsdam) is a German rower.
