= Anna Alliquander =

Hungarian rower

Personal information
- Nationality: Hungarian
- Born: 23 May 1977 (age 47); Budapest, Hungary

Sport
- Sport: Rowing

Anna Alliquander (born 23 May 1977) is a Hungarian rower. She competed in the women's lightweight double sculls event at the 2000 Summer Olympics.
