= Edit Stift =

Hungarian rower

Personal information
- Nationality: Hungarian
- Born: 9 April 1980 (age 44); Budapest, Hungary

Sport
- Sport: Rowing

Edit Stift (born 9 April 1980) is a Hungarian rower. She competed in the women's lightweight double sculls event at the 2004 Summer Olympics.
