= Renee Hykel =

American rower

Personal information
- Nationality: American
- Born: May 31, 1979 (age 45); Darby, Pennsylvania, United States

Sport
- Sport: Rowing

Renee Hykel (born May 31, 1979) is an American rower. She competed in the women's lightweight double sculls event at the 2008 Summer Olympics.
