= Eva Mirones =

Spanish rower

Personal information
- Nationality: Spanish
- Born: 8 February 1976 (age 49); San Sebastián, Spain

Sport
- Sport: Rowing

Eva Mirones (born 8 February 1976) is a Spanish rower. She competed in the women's lightweight double sculls event at the 2004 Summer Olympics.
