= Stacey Borgman =

American rower

Personal information
- Born: April 23, 1975 (age 51) Homer, Alaska, U.S.

Sport
- Country: United States
- Sport: Rowing

Stacey Borgman (born April 23, 1975) is an American rower. She competed at the 2004 Summer Olympics in Athens, in the women's lightweight double sculls. Borgman was born in Homer, Alaska.

She graduated from Barnard College in 1998 and was inducted into Columbia University's hall of fame in 2008.
