= Aline Olvera =

Mexican rower (born 1982)

Personal information
- Full name: Aline Charlotte Olvera Clauzier
- Born: 2 November 1982 (age 43) Mexico City, Mexico

Sport
- Sport: Rowing
Medal record
Representing Mexico
Pan American Games
Bronze medal – third place	2003 Santo Domingo	Lightweight quadruple sculls

Aline Charlotte Olvera Clauzier (Note: In this Spanish name, the first or paternal surname is Olvera and the second or maternal family name is Clauzier.) (born 2 November 1982) is a Mexican rower. She competed in the women's lightweight double sculls event at the 2004 Summer Olympics.
