= Lisa Schlenker =

American rower

Personal information
- Born: October 7, 1964 (age 61) Lake Oswego, Oregon, U.S.

Sport
- Country: United States
- Sport: Rowing

Lisa Schlenker (born October 7, 1964) is an American rower. She competed at the 2004 Summer Olympics in Athens, in the women's lightweight double sculls. Schlenker was born in Lake Oswego, Oregon.
