= Elżbieta Kuncewicz =

Polish rower

Personal information
- Nationality: Polish
- Born: 14 March 1973 (age 52); Łomża, Poland

Sport
- Sport: Rowing

Elżbieta Kuncewicz (born 14 March 1973) is a Polish rower. She competed in the women's lightweight double sculls event at the 2000 Summer Olympics.
