= Katrin Olsen =

Danish-Faroese rower (born 1978)

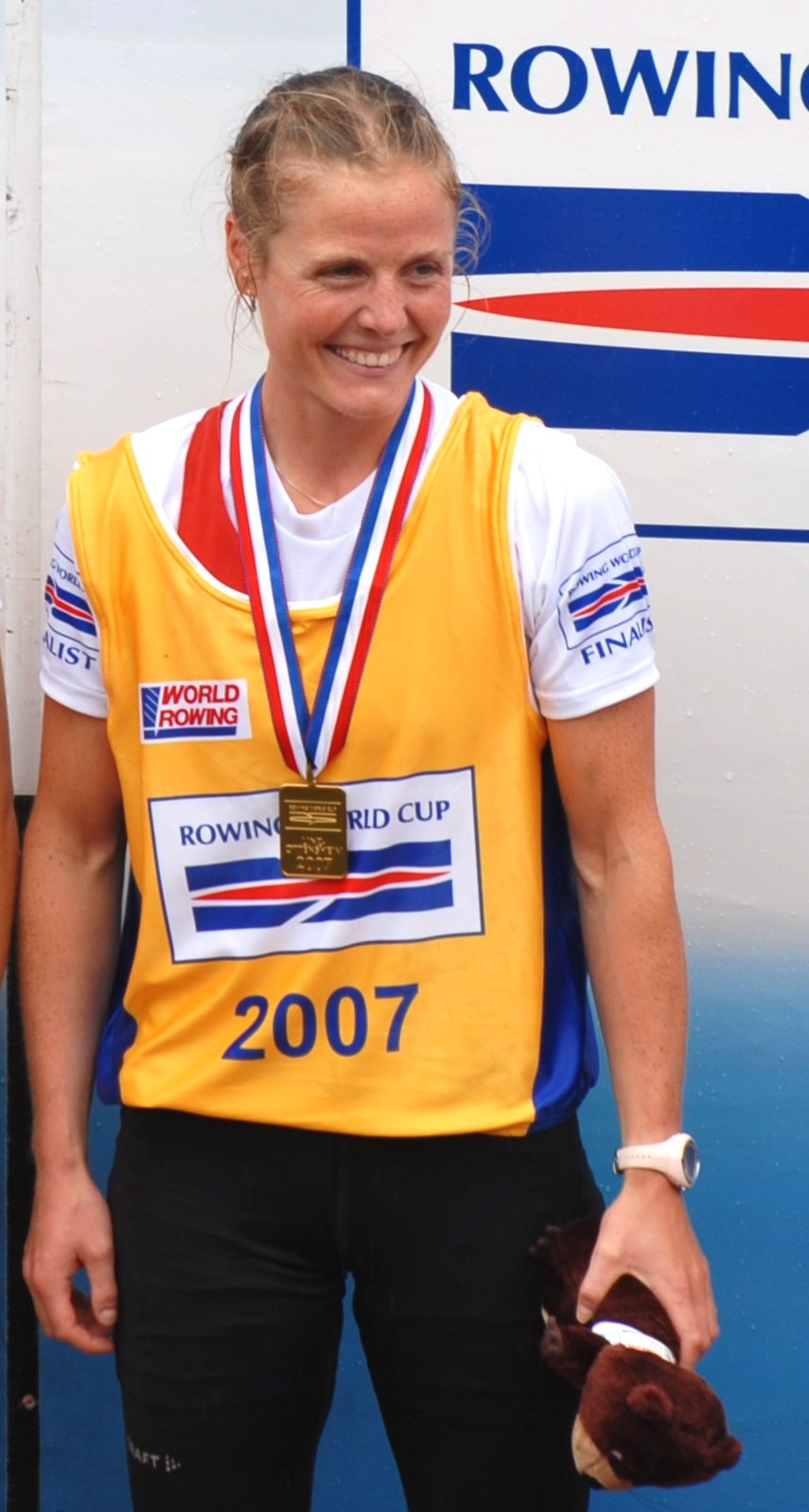
Katrin Olsen

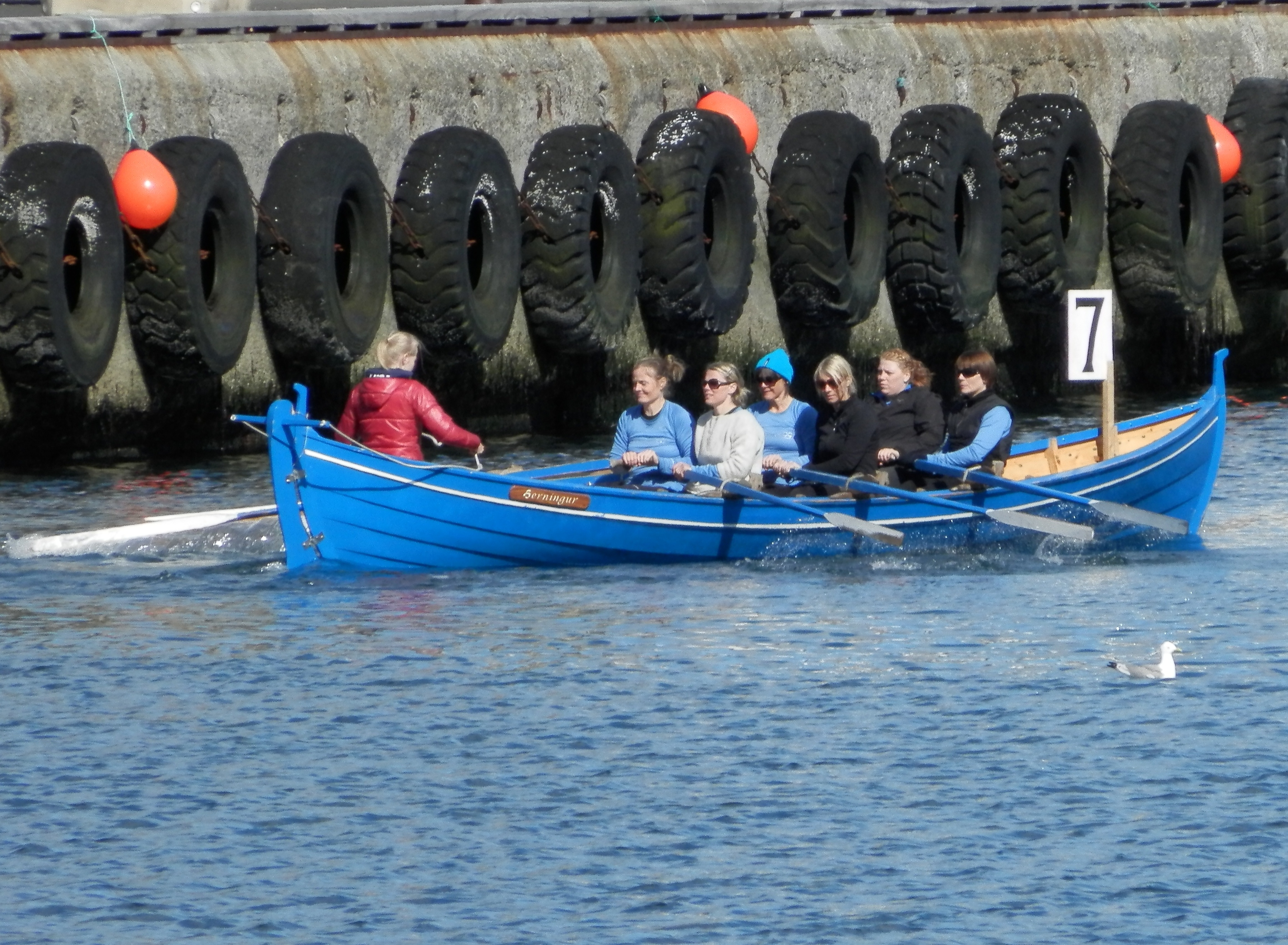
Katrin Olsen in the boat Herningur, which earlier was called Jarnbardur. This photo is from July 2012

Katrin Olsen (born 5 January 1978 in Tórshavn, Faroe Islands) is a Danish–Faroese rower, and represents Denmark. She weights 61 kilograms (134 lb), and is therefore in the lightweight class. Before she went to live in Denmark she was rowing in Faroese rowing competitions and became Faroese Rowing Champion two times with the boat Jarnbardur of Róðrarfelagið Knørrur.

== 2008 Summer Olympics ==
In rowing at the 2008 Summer Olympics (lightweight double sculls) in Beijing, Olsen and Juliane Rasmussen seemed for a long time to get the third place after Japan, but ended at second place, and was qualified for the semifinale. However, they also got the fourth place in the semifinal (only the three best qualifies for the final), and lost. Their class was later won by rowers from the Netherlands.
