= Teresa Mas =

Spanish rower

Personal information
- Nationality: Spanish
- Born: 13 September 1982 (age 42); Barcelona, Spain

Sport
- Sport: Rowing

Teresa Mas (born 13 September 1982) is a Spanish rower. She competed in the women's lightweight double sculls event at the 2004 Summer Olympics.
