= Margarita Petrova =

Bulgarian rower

Personal information
- Nationality: Bulgarian
- Born: 4 April 1977 (age 47); Varna, Bulgaria

Sport
- Sport: Rowing

Margarita Petrova (Bulgarian: Маргарита Петрова) (born 4 April 1977) is a Bulgarian rower. She competed in the women's lightweight double sculls event at the 2000 Summer Olympics.
