= Christelle Fernandez-Schulte =

French rower

Personal information
- Nationality: French
- Born: 2 February 1974 (age 51); Besançon, France

Sport
- Sport: Rowing

Christelle Fernandez-Schulte (born 2 February 1974) is a French rower. She competed in the women's lightweight double sculls event at the 2000 Summer Olympics.
