= Marlenis Mesa =

Cuban rower (born 1974)

Personal information
- Born: 20 April 1974 (age 52) Cifuentes, Cuba

Sport
- Sport: Rowing
Medal record
Representing Cuba
Pan American Games
Gold medal – first place	2003 Santo Domingo	Lightweight double sculls
Silver medal – second place	2003 Santo Domingo	Lightweight double sculls

Marlenis Mesa Hernández (born 20 April 1974) is a Cuban rower. She competed in the women's lightweight double sculls event at the 2000 Summer Olympics.
