= Lila Pérez-Rul =

Mexican rower (born 1977)

Personal information
- Born: 17 August 1977 (age 48) Torreón, Mexico

Sport
- Sport: Rowing
Medal record
Representing Mexico
Pan American Games
| Gold medal – first place | 2011 Guadalajara | Lightweight double sculls |
| Silver medal – second place | 2007 Rio de Janeiro | Lightweight double sculls |
Central American and Caribbean Games
| Gold medal – first place | 2010 Mayaguez | Single sculls |
| Gold medal – first place | 2010 Mayaguez | Lightweight double sculls |
| Gold medal – first place | 2010 Mayaguez | Quadruple sculls |
| Silver medal – second place | 2006 Cartagena | Lightweight double sculls |
| Bronze medal – third place | 2014 Veracruz | Single sculls |

Lila Pérez-Rul Rivero (born 17 August 1977) is a Mexican rower. She competed in the women's lightweight double sculls event at the 2008 Summer Olympics.
