= Angela Alupei =

Romanian rower (born 1972)

Personal information
- Born: Angela Tamaș; 1 May 1972 (age 54) Bacău, Romania
Medal record
Women's rowing
Representing Romania
Olympic Games
| Gold medal – first place | 2000 Sydney | Lightweight double sculls |
| Gold medal – first place | 2004 Athens | Lightweight double sculls |

Angela Alupei (née Tamaș, born 1 May 1972) is a Romanian Olympic rower, born in Bacău, Romania. She has been rowing since she was 17 years of age. When not competing, she is a police officer.

She, and her partner Constanța Burcică took the gold medal, at the 2000 and 2004 Olympic Games in the women's lightweight double sculls event. They also took first place at the Rowing World Cup twice in 2000, in Vienna, Austria and in Lucerne, Switzerland, and second place at the 2004 World Cup in Lucerne.

Her daughter Francesca Alupei became a volleyball player.

== Achievements ==
- 2000 Summer Olympics – Gold medal, Women's Lwt Double Sculls
- 2004 Summer Olympics – Gold medal, Women's Lwt Double Sculls
