= Maria Sakellaridou =

Greek rower (born 1981)

Personal information
- Nationality: Greek
- Born: 29 April 1981 (age 43); Thessaloniki, Greece

Sport
- Sport: Rowing

Maria Sakellaridou (born 29 April 1981) is a Greek rower. She competed in the women's lightweight double sculls event at the 2004 Summer Olympics.
