= Rowing at the 2014 Asian Games – Women's single sculls =

Women's single sculls at the 2014 Asian Games
- Venue: Tangeum Lake
- Date: 20–24 September 2014
- Competitors: 4 from 4 nations

Medalists
gold medal	Kim Ye-ji	South Korea
silver medal	Lee Ka Man	Hong Kong
bronze medal	Tạ Thanh Huyền	Vietnam

The women's single sculls competition at the 2014 Asian Games in Chungju, South Korea was held from 20 September to 24 September at the Tangeum Lake International Rowing Center.

== Schedule ==
All times are Korea Standard Time (UTC+09:00)

Date	Time	Event
Saturday, 20 September 2014	11:40	Heat
Wednesday, 24 September 2014	12:10	Final

== Results ==
=== Heat ===
- Qualification: 1–4 → Final (FA)

Rank	Athlete	Time	Notes
1	Lee Ka Man (HKG)	8:06.31	FA
2	Kim Ye-ji (KOR)	8:07.83	FA
3	Tạ Thanh Huyền (VIE)	8:28.53	FA
4	Nazanin Rahmani (IRI)	8:32.69	FA

=== Final ===
Rank	Athlete	Time
1st place, gold medalist(s)	Kim Ye-ji (KOR)	8:46.52
2nd place, silver medalist(s)	Lee Ka Man (HKG)	8:59.91
3rd place, bronze medalist(s)	Tạ Thanh Huyền (VIE)	9:16.36
4	Nazanin Rahmani (IRI)	9:34.00
