= Johanne Thomsen =

Danish rower

Personal information
- Nationality: Danish
- Born: 17 August 1982 (age 42); Skive, Denmark

Sport
- Sport: Rowing

Johanne Thomsen (born 17 August 1982) is a Danish rower. She competed in the women's lightweight double sculls event at the 2004 Summer Olympics.
