= Mun Hae-yeong =

South Korean rower

Personal information
- Nationality: South Korean
- Born: 24 July 1980 (age 44)

Sport
- Sport: Rowing

Mun Hae-yeong (born 24 July 1980) is a South Korean rower. She competed in the women's lightweight double sculls event at the 2000 Summer Olympics.
