= Viktoriya Dimitrova =

Bulgarian rower

Personal information
- Nationality: Bulgarian
- Born: 12 October 1979 (age 45); Varna, Bulgaria

Sport
- Sport: Rowing

Viktoriya Dimitrova (Bulgarian: Виктория Димитрова; born 12 October 1979) is a Bulgarian rower. She competed in the women's lightweight double sculls event at the 2000 Summer Olympics.
