= Mara Jones =

Canadian rower

Mara Jones (born August 9, 1974) is a Canadian rower. She was a student at the University of Toronto. She won a gold medal on the world cup circuit in 2004, in the lightweight double sculls event in Lucerne, Switzerland and competed in the same event at the 2004 Athens Olympics, finishing in eight position. Jones was born in Richmond Hill, Ontario.
