= Kim Plugge =

Swiss Olympic rower

Kim Plugge (born 6 June 1975 in Alkmaar, Netherlands) is a Swiss rower. Along with Pia Vogel she finished fifth in the women's lightweight double sculls at the Sydney 2000 Summer Olympics.
