= Marit van Eupen =

Dutch rower (born 1969)

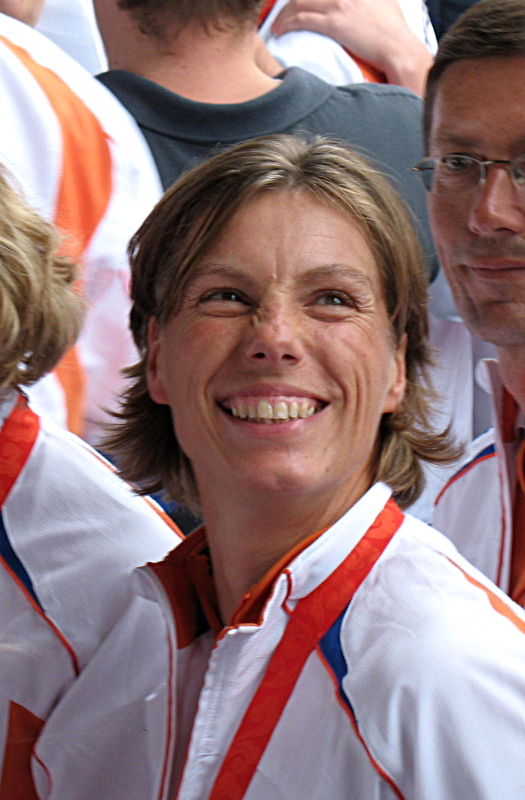

Medal record

Women's rowing

Representing the Netherlands

Olympic Games
Gold medal – first place	2008 Beijing	LW2x
Bronze medal – third place	2004 Athens	LW2x

World Rowing Championships
Gold medal – first place	2005 Kaizu	LW1x
Gold medal – first place	2006 Eton	LW1x
Gold medal – first place	2007 Munich	LW1x

Marit van Eupen (born 26 September 1969 in Arnhem) is a rower from the Netherlands.

Together with Kirsten van der Kolk she participated at the 2000 Summer Olympics in Sydney where they finished in sixth position in the lightweight double sculls. Four years later they took part in the 2004 Summer Olympics in Athens where they won the bronze medal. After those Olympics she was World Champion in 2005 (Gifu), 2006 (Eton) and 2007 (Munich). in the Lightweight Single Sculls. In 2008 she and Kirsten van der Kolk reunited and came second in the Rowing World Cup meeting in Luzern and they qualified for the 2008 Summer Olympics where they won Gold.

In 2006 van Eupen received the "Golden Oar", first awarded to Janus Ooms in 1892. For three years in a row, between 2005 and 2008, she was given the Amsterdam Sportswoman of the year award.

She retired from rowing in 2011.
