= Bénédicte Dorfman-Luzuy =

French rower

Personal information
- Born: 2 December 1970 (age 55) Bordeaux, France

Sport
- Sport: Rowing
Medal record
Representing France
World Rowing Championships
Silver medal – second place	1996 Strathclyde	LW1x
Silver medal – second place	1997 Aiguebelette	LW1x
Silver medal – second place	1998 Cologne	LW1x
Silver medal – second place	2005 Gifu	LW1x
Summer Universiade
Bronze medal – third place	1993 Buffalo	W4+

Bénédicte Dorfman-Luzuy (born 2 December 1970) is a French rower. She is married to fellow rower Xavier Dorfman.
