= Kirsten van der Kolk =

Dutch rower (born 1975)

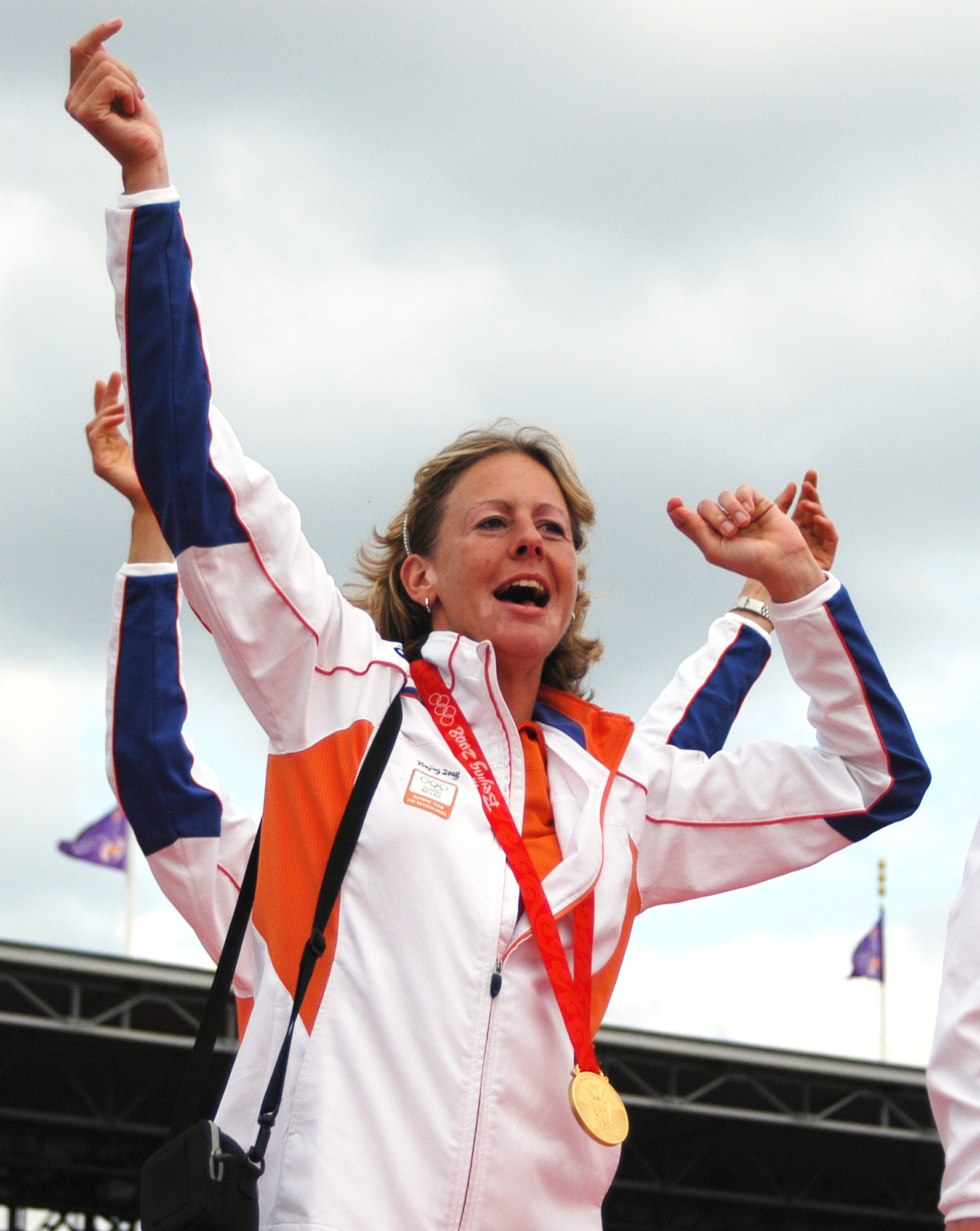

Medal record

Women's rowing

Representing the Netherlands

Olympic Games
Gold medal – first place	2008 Beijing	LW2x
Bronze medal – third place	2004 Athens	LW2x

Kirsten Irene Merian van der Kolk (born 18 December 1975, in Haarlem) is a rower from the Netherlands.

Together with Marit van Eupen she participated at the 2000 Summer Olympics in Sydney where they finished in sixth position in the lightweight double sculls. Four years later, they took part in Athens at the 2004 Summer Olympics, where they won the bronze medal. After those Olympics she retired from rowing and gave birth to a child. Less than one year before the 2008 Summer Olympics, she decided to return and became a team again with Marit van Eupen, who had become three times world champion in the non-Olympic lightweight single sculls (LW1x) during the absence of van der Kolk. In 2008, they came second in the Rowing World Cup meeting in Luzern and they qualified themselves for their third Olympics. On 17 August 2008, they won Olympic gold.
