= Constanța Burcică =

Romanian rower

Personal information
- Born: 15 March 1971 (age 55) Sohatu, Călărași, Romania
Medal record
Women's rowing
Representing Romania
Olympic Games
| Gold medal – first place | 1996 Atlanta | Lwt double sculls |
| Gold medal – first place | 2000 Sydney | Lwt double sculls |
| Gold medal – first place | 2004 Athens | Lwt double sculls |
| Silver medal – second place | 1992 Barcelona | Quadruple sculls |
| Bronze medal – third place | 2008 Beijing | Eight |
World Championships
| Gold medal – first place | 1990 Tasmania | Eight |
European Championships
| Gold medal – first place | 2008 Marathon | Eight |
Summer Universiade
| Gold medal – first place | 1993 Buffalo | Coxless four |
| Silver medal – second place | 1993 Buffalo | Quadruple sculls |

Constanța Burcică (née Pipotă; born 15 March 1971) is a Romanian Olympic rower. She won the first three instances of the women's lightweight double scull at the Olympic regatta, in 1996, 2000 and 2004.

At the 1996 Olympics, Burcică and her partner Camelia Macoviciuc took the inaugural lightweight double scull event.

Burcică and her new partner Angela Alupei took the gold medal at the 2000 and 2004 Olympic Games in the women's lightweight double scull event. They also took first place at the Rowing World Cup twice in 2000, in Vienna, Austria and in Lucerne, Switzerland, and second place at the 2004 World Cup in Lucerne.

== Achievements ==
=== Olympics ===
- 1992 Summer Olympics – Silver medal, Women's Quadruple sculls
- 1996 Summer Olympics – Gold medal, Women's Lwt Double sculls
- 2000 Summer Olympics – Gold medal, Women's Lwt Double sculls
- 2004 Summer Olympics – Gold medal, Women's Lwt Double sculls
- 2008 Summer Olympics - Bronze medal, Women's Eights

=== World Rowing Championships ===
- 1995 – 11th Place, Women's Open Single scull
- 1999 – 1st Place, Women's Lwt Double sculls
- 2001 – 2nd Place, Women's Lwt Single scull
- 2003 – 3rd Place, Women's Lwt Double sculls
