= Rowing at the 2006 Central American and Caribbean Games =

- Venue: Virgilio Uribe Rowing and Canoeing Course
- Location: Mexico City

The Rowing competition at the 2006 Central American and Caribbean Games was held in the Virgilio Uribe Rowing and Canoeing Course in Mexico City. The tournament was scheduled to be held from 15–30 July 2006.

== Medal summary ==
=== Men's events ===
Event	Gold		Silver		Bronze	
Single Sculls	Yoennis Hernández (CUB)	7:23.5	Patrick Loliger (MEX)	7:27.5	Pedro Berganza (ESA)	7:40.6
Lightweight Single Sculls	Eyder Batista (CUB)	7:21.8	Horacio Rangel (MEX)	7:27.6	Edgar Nanne Jr. (GUA)	7:34.0
Double Sculls	Cuba; Yoennis Hernández; Yuleisys Cascaret	6:43.8	Mexico; Raymundo Estanol; Leopoldo Tejada	6:49.3	Venezuela; Dhison Hernandez; Emilio Torres	6:53.1
Lightweight Coxless Pairs	Guatemala; Juan Guevara; Oscar Maeda	6:53.7	Cuba; Gleis Velazquez; Junior Perez	6:59.4	Mexico; Arturo Bastida; Pablo Caballero	7:08.0

=== Women's events ===
Event	Gold		Silver		Bronze	
Lightweight Single Sculls	Ismaray Marrero (CUB)	8:30.0	Gabriela Huerta (MEX)	8:36.6	Aida Turcios (ESA)	8:44.4
Lightweight Double Sculls	Cuba; Ismaray Marrero; Daylin Taset	7:40.7	Mexico; Lila Perez; Analicia Ramirez	7:44.8	Venezuela; Angelica Saavedra; Ana Santoyo	7:59.2

== Medal table ==
Rank	Nation	Gold	Silver	Bronze	Total
1	Cuba	5	1	0	6
2	Guatemala	1	0	1	2
3	Mexico	0	5	1	6
4	El Salvador	0	0	2	2
4	Venezuela	0	0	2	2
Totals (5 entries)		6	6	6	18
