= Pia Vogel =

Swiss rower

Medal record

Women's rowing

Representing Switzerland

World Rowing Championships
Gold medal – first place	1998 Cologne	LW1x
Gold medal – first place	1999 St. Catharines	LW1x
Bronze medal – third place	1994 Indianapolis	LW1x
Bronze medal – third place	2001 Lucerne	LW1x

Pia Vogel (born 8 January 1969) is a Swiss rower. Along with Kim Plugge she finished 5th in the women's lightweight double sculls at the 2000 Summer Olympics.
