= Amsterdam Sportsman of the year =

Amsterdam Sportsman and Sportswoman of the Year
- Description: Honouring the best athletes associated with the city of Amsterdam
- Location: Amsterdam
- Country: Netherlands
- Presented by: Topsport Amsterdam / City of Amsterdam
- Website: topsport.amsterdam/sportgala/

The Amsterdam Sportsman and Sportswoman of the Year is an annual award given to sportspeople associated with Amsterdam (through birth or otherwise), organised since 1999 by the city's division for elite sport named Topsport Amsterdam in cooperation with the city council. Awards are also given for the "Coach of the Year" and the "Talent of the Year".

== Amsterdam sporter of the year ==
Year	Men's winner	Sport	Women's winner	Sport
1999	Raymond Joval	Boxing	Carole Thate	Field hockey
2000	Marten Eikelboom	Field hockey	Lieja Koeman	Athletics
2001	Rafael van der Vaart	Football (soccer)	Mieke de Boer	Darts
2002	Edwin de Nijs	Canoeing	Marjolein de Jong	Athletics
2003	Johan Kenkhuis	Swimming	Marrit Leenstra	Beach volleyball
2004	Michiel Bartman; Diederik Simon	Rowing	Marleen Veldhuis	Swimming
2005	Guillaume Elmont	Judo	Marit van Eupen	Rowing
2006	Gregory Sedoc	Athletics	Marit van Eupen	Rowing
2007	Gregory Sedoc	Athletics	Marit van Eupen	Rowing
2008	Marcel van der Westen	Athletics	Femke Heemskerk	Swimming
2009				
2010				
2011	Rob Cordemans	Baseball	Jiske Griffioen	Wheelchair tennis
2012	Floris Evers	Field hockey	Marlou van Rhijn	Athletics (paralympic)
2013	Robert Lücken	Rowing	Ellen van Dijk	Cycling

== Amsterdam Coach and Talent of the Year ==
Year	Coach	sport	talent	Sport
1999	Ton Boot	Basketball	Mark de Reuver	Motocross
2000	Charles van Commenée	Athletics	Rafael van der Vaart	Football (soccer)
2001	Ton Boot	Basketball	Vanesca Nortan	Karate
2002	Ronald Koeman	Football (soccer)	Nigel de Jong	Football (soccer)
2003	Jim Irvine	Field hockey	Wesley Sneijder	Football (soccer)
2004	Mark Emke	Rowing	Igor Sijsling	Tennis
2005	Josy Verdonkschot	Rowing	Hedwiges Maduro	Football (soccer)
2006	Giles Bonnet	Field hockey	Urby Emanuelson	Football (soccer)
2007	Martin Truijens	Swimming	Nick Driebergen	Swimming
2008	Josy Verdonkschot	Rowing	Tessa Brouwer	Swimming
2009				
2010				
2011				
2012				
2013	Mark Emke	Rowing	Jules de Bont	Athletics

== See also ==
- Dutch Sportsman of the year
- Rotterdam Sportsman of the year
