= Berit Carow =

German rower

Medal record

Women's rowing

Representing Germany

World Rowing Championships
Silver medal – second place	2006 Eton	LW1x
Bronze medal – third place	2007 Munich	LW2x

Berit Carow (born 12 January 1981 in West Berlin, Germany daughter of Klaus Carow) is a German rower. In 2006, she won second place the World Rowing Championships at the Dorney Lake, Eton, UK, and in 2007 the World Rowing Championships in Munich, Germany. She represented her native country at the 2008 Summer Olympics in Beijing, China.

== Club ==
In 2008, Carow rowed for RG Hansa Hamburg in her hometown, Hamburg.
