= Li Qian (politician) =

Chinese politician

- 李谦

Vice-Governor of Hebei
- In office March 2017 – August 2019
- Governor: Xu Qin

Communist Party Secretary of Hengshui
- In office December 2012 – April 2017
- Preceded by: Liu Kewei
- Succeeded by: Wang Jingwu

Mayor of Baoding
- In office January 2010 – December 2012
- Preceded by: Yu Qun
- Succeeded by: Ma Yufeng

Personal details
- Born: March 1960 (age 66) Jinzhou, Hebei, China
- Party: Chinese Communist Party (1983–2020; expelled)
- Education: PLA Nanjing Political College; Central Party School of the Chinese Communist Party

Chinese name
- Traditional Chinese: 李謙
- Simplified Chinese: 李谦
Transcriptions
Standard Mandarin
- Hanyu Pinyin: Lǐ Qiān

Li Qian (Chinese: 李谦; born March 1960) is a former Chinese politician who spent his whole career in north China's Hebei province. He entered the workforce in March 1976, and joined the Chinese Communist Party in May 1983. As of August 2019 he was under investigation by the top anti-graft body, the Chinese Communist Party Central Commission for Discipline Inspection and the National Supervisory Commission. Previously he served as vice-governor of Hebei.

== Biography ==
Li was born in Jinzhou, Hebei, in March 1960. In March 1976, he was a sent-down youth in the village of Wanzhuang.

In December 1978 he worked in Hebei Military District. He served in various posts in Shenze County before serving as its Deputy Communist Party Secretary in November 1988. From March 1989 he worked in CPC Shijiazhuang Prefectural Committee. In January 1997 he became the Deputy Communist Party Secretary of Jiaoqu District (later renamed as Yuhua District), rising to Communist Party Secretary in November 2010. He was later appointed Standing Committee member of CPC Baoding Municipal Committee and director of Publicity Department. In July 2006 he became vice-mayor of Baoding, and four years later promoted to the Mayor position. In December 2012 he was promoted to become Communist Party Secretary of Hengshui, a position he held until April 2017, when he was promoted again to become vice-governor of Hebei.

== Investigation ==
On August 27, 2019, he was placed under investigation by the Central Commission for Discipline Inspection (CCDI), the party's internal disciplinary body, and the National Supervisory Commission, the highest anti-corruption agency of China. On September 28, his qualification for delegates to the 13th Hebei People's Congress was terminated.

On January 21, 2020, he was expelled from the Communist Party and removed from his post for involvement in corruption. On February 14, Li was arrested and Li's case had been transferred to the procuratorate for further investigation and prosecution. On November 17, he stood trial Tuesday at the First Intermediate People's Court of Beijing Municipality on charges of taking bribes. Prosecutors accused Li of taking advantage of his former positions in Hebei between 2006 and 2013 to seek profits for various companies and individuals in key construction project application, real estate development and construction, and project contracting. In return, he received money and gifts worth over 50 million yuan (about 7.6 million U.S. dollars).

On August 31, 2021, he was sentenced to 14 years in prison for taking 50 million yuan ($7.74 million).

Government offices
Preceded by Yu Qun (于群)	Mayor of Baoding; 2009–2013	Succeeded by Ma Yufeng (马誉峰)
Party political offices
Preceded by Liu Kewei (刘可为)	Communist Party Secretary of Hengshui; 2013–2017	Succeeded by Wang Jingwu (王景武)
