= Li Qian (rower) =

Chinese rower (born 1985)

Personal information
- Nationality: Chinese
- Born: 19 October 1985 (age 39); Pulandian, China

Sport
- Sport: Rowing

Li Qian (born 19 October 1985) is a Chinese rower. She competed in the women's lightweight double sculls event at the 2004 Summer Olympics.
