= Christine Collins (rower) =

American rower

Personal information
- Born: September 9, 1969 (age 56) Darien, Connecticut, U.S.
Medal record
Women's rowing
Representing United States
Olympic Games
Bronze medal – third place	2000 Sydney	Lightweight double sculls
World Rowing Championships
Gold medal – first place	1994 Indianapolis	LW4-
Gold medal – first place	1995 Tampere	LW2-
Gold medal – first place	1996 Strathclyde	LW2-
Gold medal – first place	1998 Cologne	LW2x
Silver medal – second place	1999 St. Catharines	LW2x
Bronze medal – third place	1991 Vienna	LW4-

Christine Smith-Collins (born September 9, 1969) is an American rower. Prior to her rowing for team USA, Collins rowed for the Trinity College women's crew team.

She competed for the United States at the 2000 Summer Olympics, winning a bronze medal in the women's lightweight double sculls event.
