= Sanna Stén =

Finnish rower

Medal record

Women's rowing

Representing Finland

Olympic Games
Silver medal – second place	2008 Beijing	Lwt double scull

World Rowing Championships
Silver medal – second place	2007 Munich	Lwt double scull
Bronze medal – third place	2005 Gifu	Lwt double scull

European Rowing Championships
Silver medal – second place	2007 Poznan	Double scull

Sanna Stén (born 20 May 1977 in Lohja) is a Finnish rower. She won a silver medal in the women's lightweight double sculls at the 2008 Summer Olympics.
