= Valerie Viehoff =

German rower

Medal record

Women's rowing

Representing Germany

Olympic Games
Silver medal – second place	2000 Sydney	Lightweight double sculls

World Rowing Championships
Gold medal – first place	1998 Cologne	LW4x

Valerie Viehoff (born 16 February 1976 in Bonn) is a German rower.
