= Kahori Uchiyama =

Japanese rower (born 1975)

Personal information
- Nationality: Japanese
- Born: 22 September 1975 (age 51) Shizuoka, Japan

Sport
- Sport: Rowing

Kahori Uchiyama (内山 佳保里, Uchiyama Kahori; born 22 September 1975) is a Japanese rower. She competed in the women's lightweight double sculls event at the 2004 Summer Olympics.
