= Huayu, Shanxi =

Huayu 化峪镇
- Town
- Location in Shanxi
- Coordinates: 35°38′10″N 110°52′40″E
- Country: People's Republic of China
- Province: Shanxi
- Prefecture-level city: Yuncheng
- County: Jishan County
- Time zone: UTC+8 (China Standard)

Huayu (Chinese: 化峪) is a town of Jishan County, Shanxi, China. As of 2018, it has 28 villages under its administration.
