= Minna Nieminen =

Finnish rower (born 1976)

Medal record

Women's rowing

Representing Finland

Olympic Games
Silver medal – second place	2008 Beijing	Lwt double scull

World Rowing Championships
Silver medal – second place	2007 Munich	Lwt double scull
Bronze medal – third place	2005 Gifu	Lwt double scull

European Rowing Championships
Silver medal – second place	2007 Poznan	Double scull

Minna Nieminen (born 31 August 1976 in Lappeenranta) is a Finnish rower. She won a silver medal in the women's lightweight double sculls at the 2008 Summer Olympics.
