= Huayu, Shandong =

Huayu 化雨镇
- Town
- Location in Shandong
- Coordinates: 34°58′36″N 116°21′43″E
- Country: People's Republic of China
- Province: Shandong
- Prefecture-level city: Jining
- County: Jinxiang County
- Time zone: UTC+8 (China Standard)

Huayu (Chinese: 化雨) is a town of Jinxiang County, Shandong, China. As of 2018, it has 46 villages under its administration.
