= Ji Yoo-jin =

South Korean rower (born 1988)

Personal information
- Nationality: South Korean
- Born: 6 July 1988 (age 36)

Sport
- Sport: Rowing

Ji Yoo-jin (born 6 July 1988) is a South Korean rower. She competed in the women's lightweight double sculls event at the 2008 Summer Olympics.
