= Dailin Taset =

Cuban rower (born 1978)

Personal information
- Born: 19 July 1978 (age 47) Bartolomé Masó, Cuba

Sport
- Sport: Rowing
Medal record
Representing Cuba
Pan American Games
Gold medal – first place	2003 Santo Domingo	Lightweight quadruple sculls
Silver medal – second place	2003 Santo Domingo	Lightweight double sculls

Dailin Taset Aguilar (born 19 July 1978) is a Cuban rower. She competed at the 2000 Summer Olympics and the 2004 Summer Olympics.
