= Yaima Velázquez =

Cuban rower (born 1987)

Personal information
- Born: 7 April 1987 (age 39) Camagüey, Cuba

Sport
- Sport: Rowing
Medal record
Representing Cuba
Pan American Games
Gold medal – first place	2007 Rio de Janeiro	Lightweight double sculls
Silver medal – second place	2011 Guadalajara	Lightweight double sculls
Bronze medal – third place	2011 Guadalajara	Single sculls

Yaima Velázquez Falcón (born 7 April 1987) is a Cuban rower. She competed at the 2008 Summer Olympics and the 2012 Summer Olympics.
