= Fiona Milne =

Canadian rower (born 1971)

Personal information
- Nationality: Canadian
- Born: September 6, 1971 (age 54) Buenos Aires, Argentina
- Education: University of Toronto

Sport
- Sport: rowing
Medal record
Representing Canada
World Championships
Gold medal – first place	2003 Milan	Lightweight single sculls
Pan American Games
Gold medal – first place	2003 Santo Domingo	Lightweight double sculls
Silver medal – second place	2003 Santo Domingo	Single sculls

Fiona Milne (born September 6, 1971) is a Canadian rower. She attended the University of Toronto. She won a gold medal at the 2003 World Championships in Milan, Italy in the lightweight women's single sculls event.
