= Ilona Mokronowska =

Polish rower

Medal record

Women's rowing

Representing Poland

World Rowing Championships
Silver medal – second place	2001 Lucerne	Lwt double scull
Silver medal – second place	2008 Linz	Lwt quad scull
Silver medal – second place	2009 Poznań	Lwt double scull

European Championships
Silver medal – second place	2007 Poznań	Lwt double scull
Silver medal – second place	2008 Athens	Lwt double scull

Ilona Mokronowska (born 11 June 1972 in Poznań) is a Polish lightweight rower.
