= Alexandra Opachanova =

Kazakh rower (born 1989)

Aleksandra Opachanova
Personal information
- Born: 7 March 1989 (age 37)
- Height: 1.67 m (5 ft 6 in)
- Weight: 55 kg (121 lb)

Sport
- Country: Kazakhstan
- Sport: Rowing
Medal record
Asian Games
Representing Kazakhstan
Bronze medal – third place	2018 Asian Games	women's single sculls

Aleksandra Opachanova (Александра Александровна Опачанова, born 7 March 1989) is a Kazakh rower. She competed in the women's lightweight double skulls at the 2008 Summer Olympics. She also won a bronze medal at the 2018 Asian Games, competing in the women's single sculls.
