= Mónika Remsei =

Hungarian rower

Personal information
- Nationality: Hungarian
- Born: 2 October 1972 (age 52); Székesfehérvár, Hungary

Sport
- Sport: Rowing

Mónika Remsei (born 2 October 1972) is a Hungarian rower. She competed at the 2000 Summer Olympics and the 2004 Summer Olympics.
