= Yu Hua (rower) =

Chinese rower

Yu Hua (Chinese: 余华, born 19 January 1981 in Beijing, China) is a female Chinese rower, who competed for Team China at the 2008 Summer Olympics in the women's lightweight double sculls.

== Major performances ==
- 1999/2005 Asian Championships – 1st LW2X;
- 2005 National Games – 3rd LW2X;
- 2006 World Cup Munich/Poznan – 1st LW2X/lightweight single sculls;
- 2007 World Cup Amsterdam – 1st LW2X
