= Camila Carvalho =

Brazilian rower

Personal information
- Born: 30 May 1981 (age 44) Brasília, Brazil

Sport
- Sport: Rowing

Camila Carvalho (born 30 May 1981) is a Brazilian rower. She competed in the women's lightweight double sculls event at the 2008 Summer Olympics.
