= Lee Ka Man =

Hong Kong rower (born 1986)

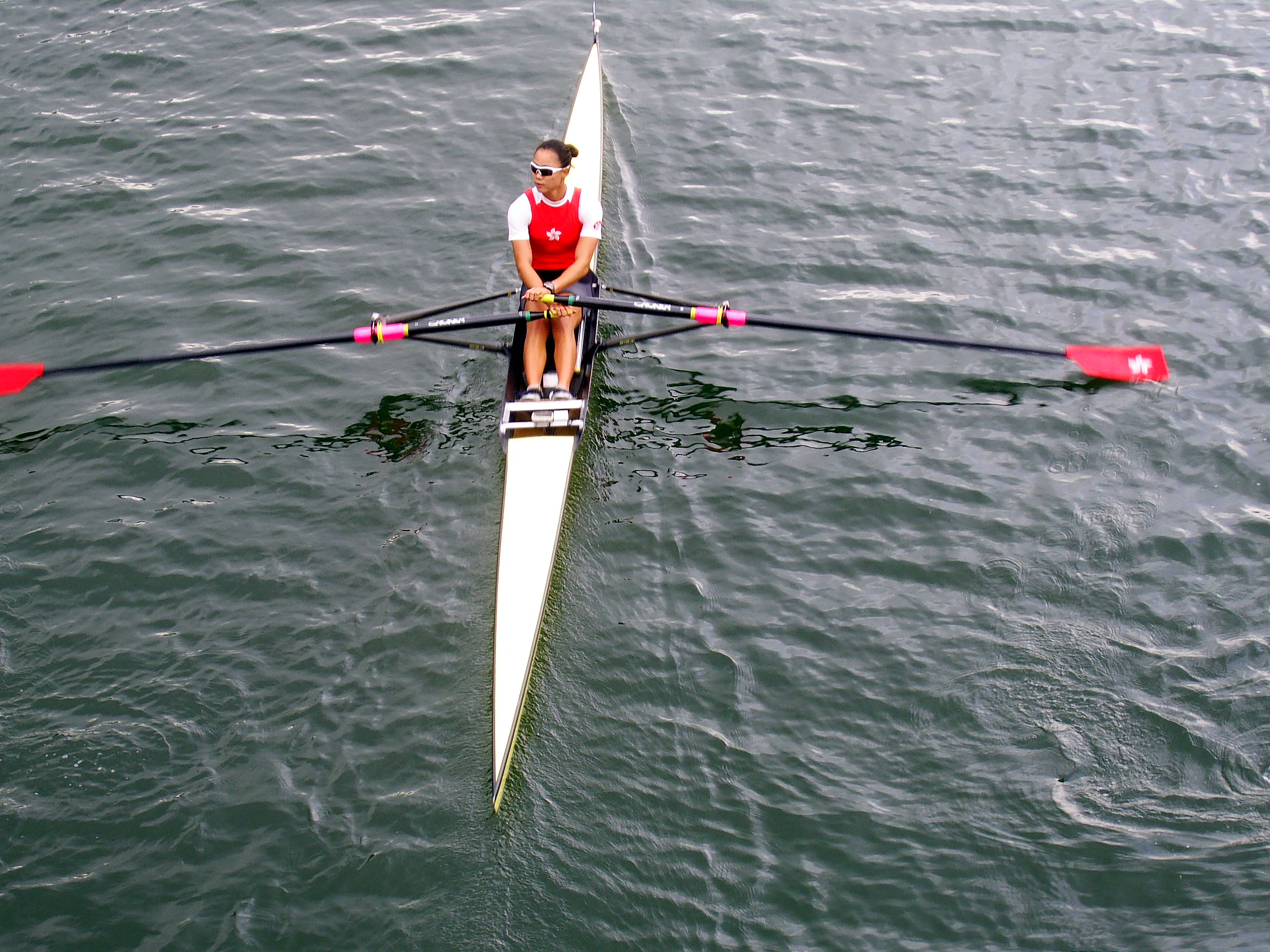
- Lee in 2009

Medal record

Representing Hong Kong

Women's Rowing

Asian Games
Silver medal – second place	2006 Doha	Ltw single sculls
Silver medal – second place	2014 Incheon	Single sculls

Lee Ka Man (Chinese: 李嘉文; Jyutping: lei^{5} gaa^{1} man^{4}; born 28 November 1986) is a rower born in British Hong Kong, who won the silver medal at the 2006 Asian Games in the lightweight single sculls class. She also competed at the 2008 Beijing Olympic Games in the Women's Single Sculls.
