= Gabriela Huerta =

Mexican rower (born 1983)

Personal information
- Born: 28 April 1983 (age 43) Mexico City, Mexico

Sport
- Sport: Rowing
Medal record
Representing Mexico
Pan American Games
Bronze medal – third place	2003 Santo Domingo	Quadruple sculls
Central American and Caribbean Games
Gold medal – first place	2002 San Salvador	Quadruple sculls
Gold medal – first place	2002 San Salvador	Lightweight quadruple sculls
Gold medal – first place	2010 Mayaguez	Double sculls
Gold medal – first place	2010 Mayaguez	Quadruple sculls
Silver medal – second place	2006 Cartagena	Single sculls

Gabriela Huerta (born 28 April 1983) is a Mexican rower. She competed at the 2004 Summer Olympics and the 2008 Summer Olympics.
