= Claudia Blasberg =

German rower (born 1975)

Medal record

Women's rowing

Representing Germany

Olympic Games
Silver medal – second place	2000 Sydney	LW2x
Silver medal – second place	2004 Athens	LW2x

World Rowing Championships
Gold medal – first place	2001 Lucerne	LW2x
Gold medal – first place	2003 Milan	LW2x
Silver medal – second place	1998 Cologne	LW2x
Silver medal – second place	2002 Seville	LW2x

Claudia Blasberg (born 14 February 1975 in Dresden) is a German rower.
