= Juliane Rasmussen =

Danish rower (born 1979)

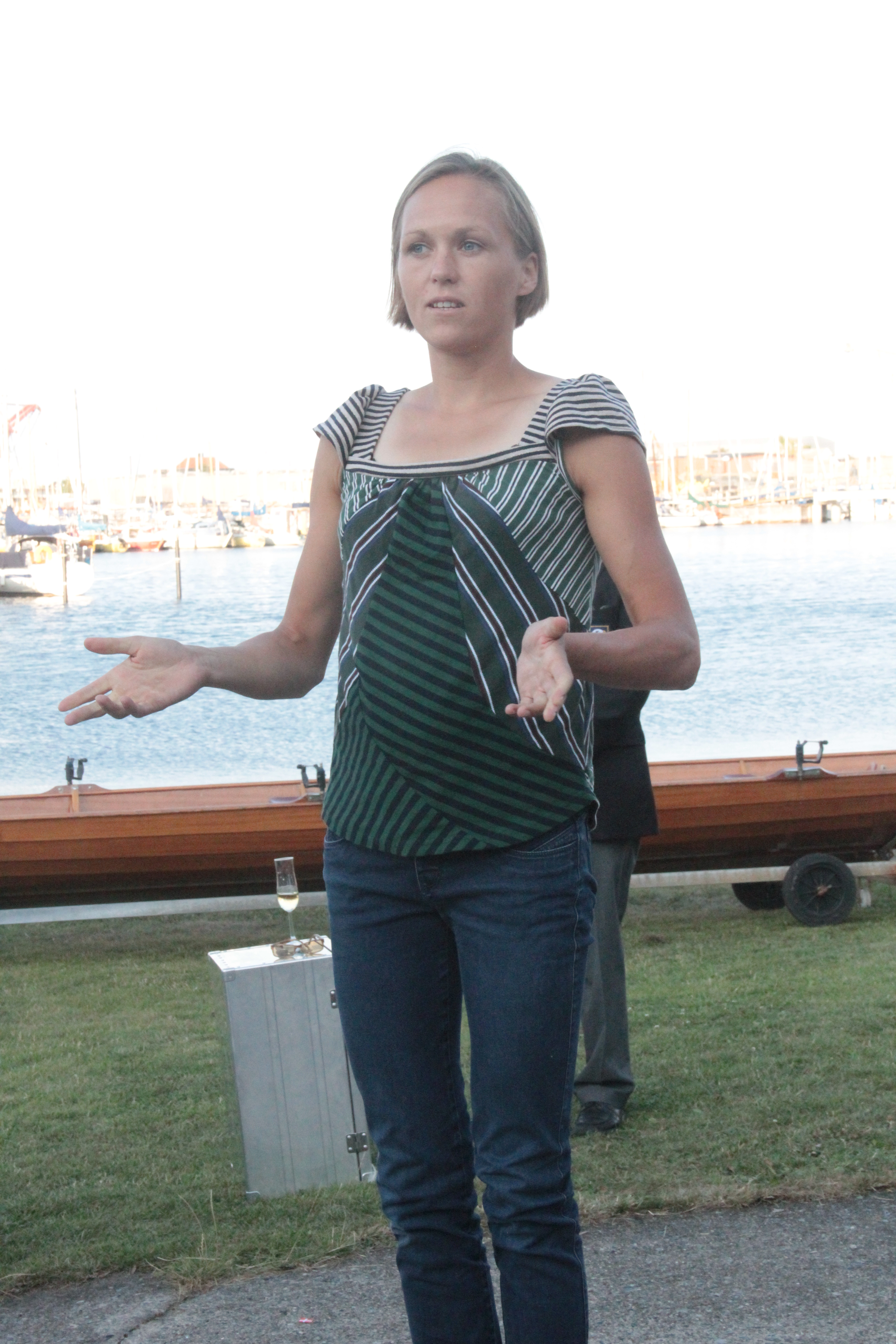
- Rasmussen in 2012

Personal information
- Nationality: Danish
- Born: 17 February 1979 (age 46); Odder

Sport
- Sport: Rowing
- Partner: Katrin Olsen
- Updated on 7 September 2012

Juliane Elander Rasmussen (born 17 February 1979, in Odder) is a Danish rower. She weighs 61 kilograms, and is therefore in the lightweight class. She lives in Copenhagen.

== 2008 Summer Olympics ==
In the first race at the lightweight double sculls at Beijing, Rasmussen and team-mate Katrin Olsen were in third place behind Japan, but finished in second place, and qualified for the semi-final. In the semi-final they came fourth (only the three best qualify for the final), and were eliminated. Their class was later won by The Netherlands.

== 2012 Summer Olympics ==
At the 2012 Summer Olympics, Rasmussen and team-mate Anne Lolk Thomsen reached the final, which they finished in fourth place.
