= Chrysi Biskitzi =

Greek rower (born 1974)

Personal information
- Nationality: Greek
- Born: 18 November 1974 (age 50); Athens, Greece

Sport
- Sport: Rowing

Chrysi Biskitzi, also Khrysa Biskitzi, (born 18 November 1974), is a Greek rower. She competed at the 1996, 2000, 2004 and the 2008 Summer Olympics.
