= Ismaray Marrero =

Cuban rower (born 1982)

Personal information
- Born: 13 August 1982 (age 43) Havana, Cuba

Sport
- Sport: Rowing
Medal record
Representing Cuba
Pan American Games
Gold medal – first place	2003 Santo Domingo	Lightweight single sculls
Gold medal – first place	2003 Santo Domingo	Lightweight quadruple sculls
Gold medal – first place	2007 Rio de Janeiro	Lightweight double sculls
Central American and Caribbean Games
Gold medal – first place	2006 Cartagena	Lightweight single sculls
Gold medal – first place	2006 Cartagena	Lightweight double sculls

Ismaray Marrero Aria (born 13 August 1982) is a Cuban rower. She competed at the 2004 Summer Olympics and the 2008 Summer Olympics.
