= Luciana Granato =

Brazilian rower

Personal information
- Born: 19 October 1977 (age 48) São Paulo, Brazil

Sport
- Sport: Rowing

Luciana Granato (born 19 October 1977) is a Brazilian rower. She competed in the women's lightweight double sculls event at the 2008 Summer Olympics.
