= Helen Casey =

British rower (born 1974)

Medal record

Women's rowing

Representing Great Britain

World Rowing Championships
Bronze medal – third place	2002 Seville	LW2x

Helen Casey (born 6 February 1974 in Stockport) is a British rower. She rowed in the Women's Lightweight Double Sculls at the 2004 and 2008 Summer Olympics and studied at Worcester College, Oxford. She first started to row in her final year as an undergraduate at St Catharine's College, Cambridge.
