= Xu Dongxiang =

Chinese rower (born 1983)

Medal record

Women's rowing

Representing China

Olympic Games
Silver medal – second place	2012 London	LW2x

World Rowing Championships
Gold medal – first place	2006 Eton	LW2x

Xu Dongxiang (Chinese: 徐东香; pinyin: Xú Dōngxiāng; born 15 January 1983 in Hangzhou) is a female Chinese rower, who competed for Team China at the 2008 Summer Olympics and 2012 Summer Olympics, where she and team-mate Huang Wenyi won the silver medal in the women's lightweight double sculls.

== Major performances ==
- 2002 Asian Games – 1st LW2X;
- 2004 Olympic Games – 5th LW2X;
- 2005 National Games – 1st LW2X/LW4X;
- 2006 World Championships – 1st LW2X;
- 2006 Asian Games – 1st lightweight single sculls;
- 2006 World Cup Leg 1/2 – 1st LW2X;
- 2007 World Cup Leg 2 – 2nd LW2X

== Records ==
- 2006 World Cup Poznan – 6:49.77 (World Best)
