= 2017 World Rowing Championships – Women's lightweight quadruple sculls =

Women's lightweight quadruple sculls at the 2017 World Rowing Championships
- Venue: Nathan Benderson Park
- Location: Sarasota, United States
- Dates: 25–29 September
- Competitors: 36 from 9 nations
- Winning time: 6:33.97

Medalists
gold medal	Asja Maregotto; Paola Piazzolla; Federica Cesarini; Giovanna Schettino	Italy
silver medal	Amy James; Alice Arch; Georgia Miansarow; Georgia Nesbitt	Australia
bronze medal	Xuan Xulian; Shen Ling; Pan Dandan; Chen Fang	China

The women's lightweight quadruple sculls competition at the 2017 World Rowing Championships in Sarasota took place in Nathan Benderson Park.

== Schedule ==
The schedule was as follows:

Date	Time	Round
Monday 25 September 2017	10:21	Heats
Tuesday 26 September 2017	11:38	Repechage
Friday 29 September 2017	09:20	Final B
Friday 29 September 2017	13:00	Final A

All times are Eastern Daylight Time (UTC-4)

== Results ==
=== Heats ===
The two fastest boats in each heat advanced directly to the A final. The remaining boats were sent to the repechage.

==== Heat 1 ====
Rank	Rowers	Country	Time	Notes
1	Patricia Mara; Jennifer Casson; Jill Moffatt; Ellen Gleadow	Canada	6:43.94	FA
2	Gemma Hall; Robyn Hart-Winks; Madeleine Arlett; Eleanor Piggott	Great Britain	6:44.16	FA
3	Atsumi Fukumoto; Ai Kawamoto; Natsumi Yamaryo; Ai Tsuchiya	Japan	6:48.65	R
4	Jennifer Sager; Jillian Zieff; Cara Stawicki; Kathryn Schiro	United States	6:57.63	R
5	Dinh Thi Hao; Tạ Thanh Huyền; Nguyễn Thị Giang; Hồ Thị Lý	Vietnam	7:10.00	R

==== Heat 2 ====
Rank	Rowers	Country	Time	Notes
1	Asja Maregotto; Paola Piazzolla; Federica Cesarini; Giovanna Schettino	Italy	6:39.60	FA
2	Amy James; Alice Arch; Georgia Miansarow; Georgia Nesbitt	Australia	6:40.96	FA
3	Xuan Xulian; Shen Ling; Pan Dandan; Chen Fang	China	6:44.31	R
4	Phuttharaksa Neegree; Matinee Raruen; Rojjana Raklao; Tippaporn Pitukpaothai	Thailand	7:15.59	R

=== Repechage ===
The two fastest boats advanced to the A final. The remaining boats were sent to the B final.

Rank	Rowers	Country	Time	Notes
1	Xuan Xulian; Shen Ling; Pan Dandan; Chen Fang	China	6:40.75	FA
2	Atsumi Fukumoto; Ai Kawamoto; Natsumi Yamaryo; Ai Tsuchiya	Japan	6:44.82	FA
3	Jennifer Sager; Jillian Zieff; Cara Stawicki; Kathryn Schiro	United States	6:51.24	FB
4	Dinh Thi Hao; Tạ Thanh Huyền; Nguyễn Thị Giang; Hồ Thị Lý	Vietnam	7:00.94	FB
5	Phuttharaksa Neegree; Matinee Raruen; Rojjana Raklao; Tippaporn Pitukpaothai	Thailand	7:10.34	FB

=== Finals ===
The A final determined the rankings for places 1 to 6. Additional rankings were determined in the B final.

==== Final B ====
Rank	Rowers	Country	Time
1	Jennifer Sager; Jillian Zieff; Cara Stawicki; Kathryn Schiro	United States	6:54.71
2	Dinh Thi Hao; Tạ Thanh Huyền; Nguyễn Thị Giang; Hồ Thị Lý	Vietnam	7:12.21
3	Phuttharaksa Neegree; Matinee Raruen; Rojjana Raklao; Tippaporn Pitukpaothai	Thailand	7:16.65

==== Final A ====
Rank	Rowers	Country	Time
1st place, gold medalist(s)	Asja Maregotto; Paola Piazzolla; Federica Cesarini; Giovanna Schettino	Italy	6:33.97
2nd place, silver medalist(s)	Amy James; Alice Arch; Georgia Miansarow; Georgia Nesbitt	Australia	6:35.47
3rd place, bronze medalist(s)	Xuan Xulian; Shen Ling; Pan Dandan; Chen Fang	China	6:36.33
4	Patricia Mara; Jennifer Casson; Jill Moffatt; Ellen Gleadow	Canada	6:36.46
5	Gemma Hall; Robyn Hart-Winks; Madeleine Arlett; Eleanor Piggott	Great Britain	6:47.94
6	Atsumi Fukumoto; Ai Kawamoto; Natsumi Yamaryo; Ai Tsuchiya	Japan	6:49.62
