= 2016 World Rowing Championships – Women's lightweight single sculls =

Women's lightweight single sculls at the 2016 World Rowing Championships
- Venue: Willem-Alexander Baan
- Location: Rotterdam, Netherlands
- Dates: 22–27 August
- Competitors: 22 from 22 nations
- Winning time: 8:28:45

Medalists
gold medal	Zoe McBride	New Zealand
silver medal	Emma Fredh	Sweden
bronze medal	Katherine Sauks	Canada

The women's lightweight single seagulls competition at the 2016 World Rowing Championships in Rotterdam took place at the Willem-Alexander Baan.

== Schedule ==
The schedule was as follows:

Date	Time	Round
Monday 22 August 2016	16:35	Heats
Tuesday 23 August 2016	11:00	Repechages
Wednesday 24 August 2016	17:10	Semifinals C/D
Thursday 25 August 2016	15:25	Semifinals A/B
Saturday 27 August 2016	10:40	Final D
Saturday 27 August 2016	10:55	Final C
Saturday 27 August 2016	11:15	Final B
Saturday 27 August 2016	12:25	Final A

All times are Central European Summer Time (UTC+2)

== Results ==
=== Heats ===
Heat winners advanced directly to the A/B semifinals. The remaining boats were sent to the repechages.

==== Heat 1 ====
Rank	Rower	Country	Time	Notes
1	Aja Runge Holmegaard	Denmark	7:46.69	SA/B
2	Georgia Dimakou	Greece	7:48.11	R
3	Olga Svirska	Latvia	8:08.80	R
4	Georgia Nesbitt	Australia	8:14.27	R
5	Shoko Ueno	Japan	8:17.94	R
6	Adriana Escobar	El Salvador	8:29.06	R

==== Heat 2 ====
Rank	Rower	Country	Time	Notes
1	Patricia Merz	Switzerland	7:49.94	SA/B
2	Mary Jones	United States	7:53.63	R
3	Anja Noske	Germany	7:53.67	R
4	Leonie Pless	Austria	8:01.89	R
5	Phuttharaksa Neegree	Thailand	8:17.92	R
6	Giulia Pollini	Italy	8:18.43	R

==== Heat 3 ====
Rank	Rower	Country	Time	Notes
1	Emma Fredh	Sweden	7:43.55	SA/B
2	Katherine Sauks	Canada	7:43.92	R
3	Gemma Hall	Great Britain	7:52.33	R
4	Anastasiia Ianina	Russia	7:52.37	R
5	Guo Shuai	China	7:57.08	R

==== Heat 4 ====
Rank	Rower	Country	Time	Notes
1	Zoe McBride	New Zealand	7:44.97	SA/B
2	Eveline Peleman	Belgium	7:53.42	R
3	Elisabeth Woerner	Netherlands	7:53.68	R
4	Tereza Kocianová	Czech Republic	8:04.35	R
5	Syham Abid	Hungary	8:16.55	R

=== Repechages ===
The two fastest boats in each repechage advanced to the A/B semifinals. The remaining boats were sent to the C/D semifinals.

==== Repechage 1 ====
Rank	Rower	Country	Time	Notes
1	Anastasiia Ianina	Russia	7:37.11	SA/B
2	Georgia Dimakou	Greece	7:37.87	SA/B
3	Anja Noske	Germany	7:54.23	SC/D
4	Syham Abid	Hungary	8:08.74	SC/D
5	Adriana Escobar	El Salvador	8:13.89	SC/D

==== Repechage 2 ====
Rank	Rower	Country	Time	Notes
1	Mary Jones	United States	7:45.54	SA/B
2	Gemma Hall	Great Britain	7:51.97	SA/B
3	Tereza Kocianová	Czech Republic	7:55.19	SC/D
4	Giulia Pollini	Italy	7:56.21	SC/D
5	Shoko Ueno	Japan	8:01.52	SC/D

==== Repechage 3 ====
Rank	Rower	Country	Time	Notes
1	Katherine Sauks	Canada	7:43.02	SA/B
2	Georgia Nesbitt	Australia	7:45.59	SA/B
3	Elisabeth Woerner	Netherlands	7:48.88	SC/D
4	Phuttharaksa Neegree	Thailand	8:01.88	SC/D

==== Repechage 4 ====
Rank	Rower	Country	Time	Notes
1	Leonie Pless	Austria	7:44.43	SA/B
2	Eveline Peleman	Belgium	7:45.09	SA/B
3	Guo Shuai	China	7:53.63	SC/D
4	Olga Svirska	Latvia	7:59.09	SC/D

=== Semifinals C/D ===
The three fastest boats in each semi were sent to the C final. The remaining boats were sent to the D final.

==== Semifinal 1 ====
Rank	Rower	Country	Time	Notes
1	Anja Noske	Germany	7:46.45	FC
2	Elisabeth Woerner	Netherlands	7:49.49	FC
3	Giulia Pollini	Italy	7:52.76	FC
4	Olga Svirska	Latvia	7:53.98	FD
5	Adriana Escobar	El Salvador	8:09.04	FD

==== Semifinal 2 ====
Rank	Rower	Country	Time	Notes
1	Guo Shuai	China	7:48.65	FC
2	Tereza Kocianová	Czech Republic	7:51.92	FC
3	Shoko Ueno	Japan	7:59.01	FC
4	Phuttharaksa Neegree	Thailand	8:04.32	FD
5	Syham Abid	Hungary	8:13.88	FD

=== Semifinals A/B ===
The three fastest boats in each semi advanced to the A final. The remaining boats were sent to the B final.

==== Semifinal 1 ====
Rank	Rower	Country	Time	Notes
1	Emma Fredh	Sweden	7:36.99	FA
2	Mary Jones	United States	7:39.29	FA
3	Georgia Dimakou	Greece	7:39.62	FA
4	Aja Runge Holmegaard	Denmark	7:40.05	FB
5	Georgia Nesbitt	Australia	7:48.91	FB
6	Leonie Pless	Austria	7:52.17	FB

==== Semifinal 2 ====
Rank	Rower	Country	Time	Notes
1	Zoe McBride	New Zealand	7:31.45	FA
2	Anastasiia Ianina	Russia	7:34.35	FA
3	Katherine Sauks	Canada	7:34.96	FA
4	Patricia Merz	Switzerland	7:37.15	FB
5	Eveline Peleman	Belgium	7:48.47	FB
6	Gemma Hall	Great Britain	7:50.54	FB

=== Finals ===
The A final determined the rankings for places 1 to 6. Additional rankings were determined in the other finals.

==== Final D ====
Rank	Rower	Country	Time
1	Olga Svirska	Latvia	8:52.91
2	Phuttharaksa Neegree	Thailand	9:09.58
3	Syham Abid	Hungary	9:12.45
4	Adriana Escobar	El Salvador	9:30.71

==== Final C ====
Rank	Rower	Country	Time
1	Anja Noske	Germany	8:40.91
2	Guo Shuai	China	8:48.48
3	Tereza Kocianová	Czech Republic	8:52.00
4	Elisabeth Woerner	Netherlands	8:58.07
5	Shoko Ueno	Japan	8:59.31
6	Giulia Pollini	Italy	9:14.43

==== Final B ====
Rank	Rower	Country	Time
1	Patricia Merz	Switzerland	8:44.92
2	Aja Runge Holmegaard	Denmark	8:49.39
3	Georgia Nesbitt	Australia	8:49.65
4	Leonie Pless	Austria	8:56.94
5	Eveline Peleman	Belgium	8:59.31
6	Gemma Hall	Great Britain	9:01.11

==== Final A ====
Rank	Rower	Country	Time
1st place, gold medalist(s)	Zoe McBride	New Zealand	8:28.45
2nd place, silver medalist(s)	Emma Fredh	Sweden	8:29.12
3rd place, bronze medalist(s)	Katherine Sauks	Canada	8:37.96
4	Mary Jones	United States	8:38.73
5	Georgia Dimakou	Greece	8:41.12
6	Anastasiia Ianina	Russia	8:46.34
