= 2018 World Rowing Championships – Women's lightweight single sculls =

Women's lightweight single sculls at the 2018 World Rowing Championships
- Venue: Plovdiv Regatta Venue
- Location: Plovdiv, Bulgaria
- Dates: 9–14 September
- Competitors: 20 from 20 nations
- Winning time: 7:51.79

Medalists
gold medal	Laura Tarantola	France
silver medal	Clara Guerra	Italy
bronze medal	Imogen Grant	Great Britain

The women's lightweight single sculls competition at the 2018 World Rowing Championships in Plovdiv took place at the Plovdiv Regatta Venue.

== Schedule ==
The schedule was as follows:

Date	Time	Round
Sunday 9 September 2018	10:02	Heats
Tuesday 11 September 2018	10:26	Repechages
Thursday 13 September 2018	11:00	Semifinals A/B
Thursday 13 September 2018	14:45	Semifinals C/D
Friday 14 September 2018	13:16	Final A
Friday 14 September 2018	15:19	Final B
Friday 14 September 2018	15:35	Final C
Friday 14 September 2018	15:51	Final D

All times are Eastern European Summer Time (UTC+3)

== Results ==
=== Heats ===
The two fastest boats in each heat advanced directly to the A/B semifinals. The remaining boats were sent to the repechages.

==== Heat 1 ====
Rank	Rowers	Country	Time	Notes
1	Jill Moffatt	Canada	7:42.14	SA/B
2	Alice Arch	Australia	7:43.34	SA/B
3	Anja Manoutschehri	Austria	7:49.94	R
4	Dorottya Bene	Hungary	7:59.88	R
5	Emma Fredh	Sweden	8:05.82	R

==== Heat 2 ====
Rank	Rowers	Country	Time	Notes
1	Imogen Grant	Great Britain	7:29.39	SA/B
2	Alena Furman	Belarus	7:38.22	SA/B
3	Anastasia Lebedeva	Russia	7:49.61	R
4	Ai Tsuchiya	Japan	7:53.17	R
5	Iben Østergaard	Denmark	8:08.59	R

==== Heat 3 ====
Rank	Rowers	Country	Time	Notes
1	Clara Guerra	Italy	7:39.77	SA/B
2	Katarzyna Welna	Poland	7:44.55	SA/B
3	Olga Svirska	Latvia	7:47.99	R
4	Amina Rouba	Algeria	7:53.24	R
5	Lee Ka Man	Hong Kong	8:03.94	R

==== Heat 4 ====
Rank	Rowers	Country	Time	Notes
1	Laura Tarantola	France	7:35.03	SA/B
2	Michelle Sechser	United States	7:36.38	SA/B
3	Martine Veldhuis	Netherlands	7:42.59	R
4	Khadija Krimi	Tunisia	7:44.54	R
5	Marie-Louise Dräger	Germany	7:47.73	R

=== Repechages ===
The two fastest boats in each repechage advanced to the A/B semifinals. The remaining boats were sent to the C/D semifinals.

==== Repechage 1 ====
Rank	Rowers	Country	Time	Notes
1	Anastasia Lebedeva	Russia	7:46.01	SA/B
2	Khadija Krimi	Tunisia	7:46.98	SA/B
3	Anja Manoutschehri	Austria	7:48.86	SC/D
4	Amina Rouba	Algeria	7:55.60	SC/D
5	Lee Ka Man	Hong Kong	8:05.19	SC/D
–	Emma Fredh	Sweden	DNS	–

==== Repechage 2 ====
Rank	Rowers	Country	Time	Notes
1	Marie-Louise Dräger	Germany	7:39.84	SA/B
2	Martine Veldhuis	Netherlands	7:43.68	SA/B
3	Olga Svirska	Latvia	7:47.88	SC/D
4	Iben Østergaard	Denmark	7:49.90	SC/D
5	Dorottya Bene	Hungary	7:55.25	SC/D
6	Ai Tsuchiya	Japan	7:55.58	SC/D

=== Semifinals C/D ===
All but the slowest boat in each semi were sent to the C final. The slowest boats were sent to the D final.

==== Semifinal 1 ====
Rank	Rowers	Country	Time	Notes
1	Anja Manoutschehri	Austria	7:59.20	FC
2	Iben Østergaard	Denmark	8:06.57	FC
3	Ai Tsuchiya	Japan	8:12.11	FC
4	Lee Ka Man	Hong Kong	8:17.55	FD

==== Semifinal 2 ====
Rank	Rowers	Country	Time	Notes
1	Olga Svirska	Latvia	8:04.52	FC
2	Dorottya Bene	Hungary	8:05.26	FC
3	Amina Rouba	Algeria	8:10.36	FD

=== Semifinals A/B ===
The three fastest boats in each semi advanced to the A final. The remaining boats were sent to the B final.

==== Semifinal 1 ====
Rank	Rowers	Country	Time	Notes
1	Imogen Grant	Great Britain	7:43.01	FA
2	Michelle Sechser	United States	7:44.84	FA
3	Jill Moffatt	Canada	7:45.85	FA
4	Katarzyna Welna	Poland	7:52.07	FB
5	Martine Veldhuis	Netherlands	8:00.82	FB
6	Anastasia Lebedeva	Russia	8:05.20	FB

==== Semifinal 2 ====
Rank	Rowers	Country	Time	Notes
1	Alena Furman	Belarus	7:43.34	FA
2	Laura Tarantola	France	7:43.41	FA
3	Clara Guerra	Italy	7:44.02	FA
4	Marie-Louise Dräger	Germany	7:50.13	FB
5	Alice Arch	Australia	7:50.99	FB
6	Khadija Krimi	Tunisia	8:00.07	FB

=== Finals ===
The A final determined the rankings for places 1 to 6. Additional rankings were determined in the other finals.

==== Final D ====
Rank	Rowers	Country	Time
1	Amina Rouba	Algeria	8:12.53
2	Lee Ka Man	Hong Kong	8:19.61

==== Final C ====
Rank	Rowers	Country	Time
1	Anja Manoutschehri	Austria	7:55.39
2	Olga Svirska	Latvia	8:00.70
3	Iben Østergaard	Denmark	8:05.17
4	Dorottya Bene	Hungary	8:08.28
5	Ai Tsuchiya	Japan	8:09.45

==== Final B ====
Rank	Rowers	Country	Time
1	Martine Veldhuis	Netherlands	7:52.27
2	Katarzyna Welna	Poland	7:52.37
3	Marie-Louise Dräger	Germany	7:56.11
4	Alice Arch	Australia	7:56.25
5	Khadija Krimi	Tunisia	7:57.66
6	Anastasia Lebedeva	Russia	8:03.93

==== Final A ====
Rank	Rowers	Country	Time
1st place, gold medalist(s)	Laura Tarantola	France	7:51.79
2nd place, silver medalist(s)	Clara Guerra	Italy	7:51.96
3rd place, bronze medalist(s)	Imogen Grant	Great Britain	7:52.61
4	Michelle Sechser	United States	7:53.70
5	Jill Moffatt	Canada	8:02.39
6	Alena Furman	Belarus	13:30.77
