= 2019 World Rowing Championships – Women's lightweight single sculls =

Women's lightweight single sculls at the 2019 World Rowing Championships
- Venue: Linz-Ottensheim
- Location: Ottensheim, Austria
- Dates: 25–30 August
- Competitors: 17 from 17 nations
- Winning time: 7:43.98

Medalists
gold medal	Marie-Louise Dräger	Germany
silver medal	Chiaki Tomita	Japan
bronze medal	Madeleine Arlett	Great Britain

The women's lightweight single sculls competition at the 2019 World Rowing Championships took place at the Linz-Ottensheim regatta venue.

== Schedule ==
The schedule was as follows:

Date	Time	Round
Sunday 25 August 2019	13:21	Heats
Tuesday 27 August 2019	10:56	Repechages
Thursday 29 August 2019	13:12	Semifinals A/B
Friday 30 August 2019	10:00	Final C
Friday 30 August 2019	10:27	Final B
Friday 30 August 2019	13:38	Final A

All times are Central European Summer Time (UTC+2)

== Results ==
=== Heats ===
The two fastest boats in each heat advanced directly to the A/B semifinals. The remaining boats were sent to the repechages.

==== Heat 1 ====
Rank	Rower	Country	Time	Notes
1	Nicole van Wyk	South Africa	8:02.14	SA/B
2	Emily Schmieg	United States	8:05.23	SA/B
3	Maia Lund	Norway	8:05.39	R
4	Emma Fredh	Sweden	8:10.71	R
5	Paola Piazzolla	Italy	8:12.03	R
6	Winne Hung	Hong Kong	8:19.87	R

==== Heat 2 ====
Rank	Rower	Country	Time	Notes
1	Marie-Louise Dräger	Germany	7:57.79	SA/B
2	Martine Veldhuis	Netherlands	8:01.49	SA/B
3	Lydia Heaphy	Ireland	8:01.79	R
4	Mathilde Persson	Denmark	8:06.24	R
5	Fu Xiaoyue	China	8:26.13	R
6	Gabriela Mosqueira	Paraguay	8:31.12	R

==== Heat 3 ====
Rank	Rower	Country	Time	Notes
1	Chiaki Tomita	Japan	7:54.04	SA/B
2	Madeleine Arlett	Great Britain	7:55.27	SA/B
3	Ellen Gleadow	Canada	7:55.69	R
4	Alice Arch	Australia	8:00.42	R
5	Alina Mochula	Kazakhstan	8:34.97	R

=== Repechages ===
The three fastest boats in each repechage advanced to the A/B semifinals. The remaining boats were sent to the C final.

==== Repechage 1 ====
Rank	Rower	Country	Time	Notes
1	Ellen Gleadow	Canada	7:49.77	SA/B
2	Mathilde Persson	Denmark	7:52.91	SA/B
3	Maia Lund	Norway	7:57.20	SA/B
4	Winne Hung	Hong Kong	8:02.07	FC
5	Gabriela Mosqueira	Paraguay	8:05.55	FC
6	Alina Mochula	Kazakhstan	8:07.74	FC

==== Repechage 2 ====
Rank	Rower	Country	Time	Notes
1	Alice Arch	Australia	7:47.82	SA/B
2	Paola Piazzolla	Italy	7:48.13	SA/B
3	Lydia Heaphy	Ireland	7:48.40	SA/B
4	Emma Fredh	Sweden	7:51.59	FC
5	Fu Xiaoyue	China	7:58.30	FC

=== Semifinals ===
The three fastest boats in each semi advanced to the A final. The remaining boats were sent to the B final.

==== Semifinal 1 ====
Rank	Rower	Country	Time	Notes
1	Marie-Louise Dräger	Germany	7:32.77	FA
2	Madeleine Arlett	Great Britain	7:35.20	FA
3	Nicole van Wyk	South Africa	7:36.36	FA
4	Alice Arch	Australia	7:39.99	FB
5	Mathilde Persson	Denmark	7:40.11	FB
6	Lydia Heaphy	Ireland	7:42.23	FB

==== Semifinal 2 ====
Rank	Rower	Country	Time	Notes
1	Ellen Gleadow	Canada	7:36.91	FA
2	Chiaki Tomita	Japan	7:39.31	FA
3	Martine Veldhuis	Netherlands	7:41.20	FA
4	Maia Lund	Norway	7:43.87	FB
5	Paola Piazzolla	Italy	7:44.54	FB
6	Emily Schmieg	United States	7:47.94	FB

=== Finals ===
The A final determined the rankings for places 1 to 6. Additional rankings were determined in the other finals.

==== Final C ====
Rank	Rower	Country	Time
1	Emma Fredh	Sweden	7:58.82
2	Fu Xiaoyue	China	8:06.67
3	Gabriela Mosqueira	Paraguay	8:09.34
4	Alina Mochula	Kazakhstan	8:10.89
5	Winne Hung	Hong Kong	8:12.18

==== Final B ====
Rank	Rower	Country	Time
1	Alice Arch	Australia	7:52.59
2	Mathilde Persson	Denmark	7:52.98
3	Emily Schmieg	United States	7:54.55
4	Maia Lund	Norway	7:55.01
5	Lydia Heaphy	Ireland	7:55.40
6	Paola Piazzolla	Italy	7:55.70

==== Final A ====
Rank	Rower	Country	Time
1st place, gold medalist(s)	Marie-Louise Dräger	Germany	7:43.98
2nd place, silver medalist(s)	Chiaki Tomita	Japan	7:47.28
3rd place, bronze medalist(s)	Madeleine Arlett	Great Britain	7:49.82
4	Nicole van Wyk	South Africa	7:53.19
5	Ellen Gleadow	Canada	7:53.83
6	Martine Veldhuis	Netherlands	7:57.74
