= 2022 World Rowing Championships – Women's lightweight single sculls =

Women's lightweight single sculls at the 2022 World Rowing Championships
- Venue: Labe aréna
- Location: Račice, Czech Republic
- Dates: 18 September – 23 September
- Competitors: 24 from 24 nations
- Winning time: 7:42.59

Medalists
gold medal	Ionela-Livia Cozmiuc	Romania
silver medal	Martine Veldhuis	Netherlands
bronze medal	Jackie Kiddle	New Zealand

The women's lightweight single sculls competition at the 2022 World Rowing Championships took place at the Račice regatta venue in the Czech Republic.

== Schedule ==
The schedule was as follows:

Date	Time	Round
Sunday 18 September 2022	11:15	Heats
Tuesday 20 September 2022	10:54	Repechages
Thursday 22 September 2022	09:40	Semifinals A/B
Thursday 22 September 2022	15:10	Semifinals C/D
Sunday 23 September 2022	10:20	Final D
Sunday 23 September 2022	10:30	Final C
Sunday 23 September 2022	10:41	Final B
Sunday 23 September 2022	15:19	Final A

All times are Central European Summer Time (UTC+2)

== Results ==
=== Heats ===
The fastest boats in each heat advanced directly to the AB semifinals. The remaining boats were sent to the repechages.

==== Heat 1 ====
Rank	Rower	Country	Time	Notes
1	Kenia Lechuga	Mexico	7:35.58	SA/B
2	Lydia Heaphy	Ireland	7:36.32	R
3	Nazanin Malaei	Iran	7:43.05	R
4	Martine Veldhuis	Netherlands	7:49.08	R
5	Emi Hirouchi	Japan	7:53.97	R
6	Aura Forsberg	Finland	8:12.38	R

==== Heat 2 ====
Rank	Rower	Country	Time	Notes
1	Ionela-Livia Cozmiuc	Romania	7:31.54	SA/B
2	Eline Rol	Switzerland	7:48.42	R
3	Georgia Nesbitt	Australia	7:51.75	R
4	Marie-Louise Drager	Germany	7:53.34	R
5	Wing Wun Leung	Hong Kong	8:00.85	R
6	Mariya Chernets	Kazakhstan	8:38.19	R

==== Heat 3 ====
Rank	Rower	Country	Time	Notes
1	Jackie Kiddle	New Zealand	7:34.14	SA/B
2	Susannah Duncan	France	7:42.56	R
3	Kirsten McCann	South Africa	7:45.71	R
4	Zoi Fitsiou	Greece	7:46.31	R
5	Khadija Krimi	Tunisia	7:52.97	R
6	Karissa Riley	Canada	7:59.43	R

==== Heat 4 ====
Rank	Rower	Country	Time	Notes
1	Stefania Buttignon	Italy	7:38.99	SA/B
2	Madeleine Arlett	Great Britain	7:46.09	R
3	Natalia Miguel Gómez	Spain	7:48.17	R
4	Mary Jones	United States	7:49.20	R
5	Nihed Benchadli	Algeria	7:54.86	R
6	Maheshi Haupe	Sri Lanka	8:45.01	R

=== Repechages ===
The two fastest boats in each repechage advanced to the AB semifinals. The remaining boats were sent to the CD semifinals.

==== Repechage 1 ====
Rank	Rower	Country	Time	Notes
1	Zoi Fitsiou	Greece	7:40.03	SA/B
2	Lydia Heaphy	Ireland	7:43.48	SA/B
3	Nihed Benchadli	Algeria	7:50.99	SC/D
4	Georgia Nesbitt	Australia	7:53.56	SC/D
5	Aura Forsberg	Finland	8:18.58	SC/D

==== Repechage 2 ====
Rank	Rower	Country	Time	Notes
1	Mary Jones	United States	7:42.82	SA/B
2	Kirsten McCann	South Africa	7:43.23	SA/B
3	Eline Rol	Switzerland	7:46.25	SC/D
4	Emi Hirouchi	Japan	7:55.17	SC/D
5	Mariya Chernets	Kazakhstan	8:04.20	SC/D

==== Repechage 3 ====
Rank	Rower	Country	Time	Notes
1	Martine Veldhuis	Netherlands	7:42.91	SA/B
2	Natalia Miguel Gómez	Spain	7:50.84	SA/B
3	Susannah Duncan	France	7:53.44	SC/D
4	Karissa Riley	Canada	7:59.37	SC/D
5	Wing Wun Leung	Hong Kong	8:12.01	SC/D

==== Repechage 4 ====
Rank	Rower	Country	Time	Notes
1	Nazanin Malaei	Iran	7:40.91	SA/B
2	Khadija Krimi	Tunisia	7:48.53	SA/B
3	Madeleine Arlett	Great Britain	7:52.98	SC/D
4	Maheshi Haupe	Sri Lanka	8:37.46	SC/D
	Marie-Louise Drager	Germany	DNS	

=== Semifinals C/D ===
The three fastest boats in each semi advanced to the C final. The remaining boats were sent to the D final.

==== Semifinal 1 ====
Rank	Rower	Country	Time	Notes
1	Nihed Benchadli	Algeria	8:14.46	FC
2	Emi Hirouchi	Japan	8:16.23	FC
3	Karissa Riley	Canada	8:16.63	FC
4	Madeleine Arlett	Great Britain	8:18.62	FD
5	Aura Forsberg	Finland	8:45.99	FD

==== Semifinal 2 ====
Rank	Rower	Country	Time	Notes
1	Eline Rol	Switzerland	8:12.47	FC
2	Susannah Duncan	France	8:14.69	FC
3	Georgia Nesbitt	Australia	8:17.65	FC
4	Mariya Chernets	Kazakhstan	8:30.19	FD
5	Wing Wun Leung	Hong Kong	8:34.09	FD
6	Maheshi Haupe	Sri Lanka	9:10.51	FD

=== Semifinals A/B ===
The three fastest boats in each semi advanced to the A final. The remaining boats were sent to the B final.

==== Semifinal 1 ====
Rank	Rower	Country	Time	Notes
1	Ionela-Livia Cozmiuc	Romania	7:42.07	FA
2	Martine Veldhuis	Netherlands	7:44.86	FA
3	Kirsten McCann	South Africa	7:49.34	FA
4	Kenia Lechuga	Mexico	7:51.40	FB
5	Nazanin Malaei	Iran	7:56.27	FB
6	Lydia Heaphy	Ireland	7:56.88	FB

==== Semifinal 2 ====
Rank	Rower	Country	Time	Notes
1	Jackie Kiddle	New Zealand	7:45.29	FA
2	Zoi Fitsiou	Greece	7:47.07	FA
3	Stefania Buttignon	Italy	7:49.98	FA
4	Mary Jones	United States	7:55.89	FB
5	Natalia Miguel Gómez	Spain	8:05.33	FB
6	Khadija Krimi	Tunisia	8:07.44	FB

=== Finals ===
The A final determined the rankings for places 1 to 6. Additional rankings were determined in the other finals.

==== Final D ====
Rank	Rower	Country	Time	Total rank
1	Mariya Chernets	Kazakhstan	8:11.67	19
2	Wing Wun Leung	Hong Kong	8:17.20	20
3	Aura Forsberg	Finland	8:19.42	21
4	Maheshi Haupe	Sri Lanka	8:42.44	22
	Madeleine Arlett	Great Britain	DNS	23

==== Final C ====
Rank	Rower	Country	Time	Total rank
1	Eline Rol	Switzerland	7:48.14	13
2	Nihed Benchadli	Algeria	7:50.37	14
3	Susannah Duncan	France	7:52.81	15
4	Karissa Riley	Canada	7:54.75	16
5	Georgia Nesbitt	Australia	7:56.13	17
6	Emi Hirouchi	Japan	8:00.13	18

==== Final B ====
Rank	Rower	Country	Time	Total rank
1	Kenia Lechuga	Mexico	7:39.58	7
2	Nazanin Malaei	Iran	7:41.95	8
3	Lydia Heaphy	Ireland	7:44.13	9
4	Mary Jones	United States	7:45.89	10
5	Natalia Miguel Gómez	Spain	7:48.62	11
6	Khadija Krimi	Tunisia	7:52.23	12

==== Final A ====
Rank	Rower	Country	Time	Notes
1st place, gold medalist(s)	Ionela-Livia Cozmiuc	Romania	7:42.59	
2nd place, silver medalist(s)	Martine Veldhuis	Netherlands	7:44.48	
3rd place, bronze medalist(s)	Jackie Kiddle	New Zealand	7:44.98	
4	Kirsten McCann	South Africa	7:48.59	
5	Zoi Fitsiou	Greece	7:54.21	
6	Stefania Buttignon	Italy	8:04.26	
