= Italian military sports bodies =

Sports sections of the Italian Armed Forces and Polizia

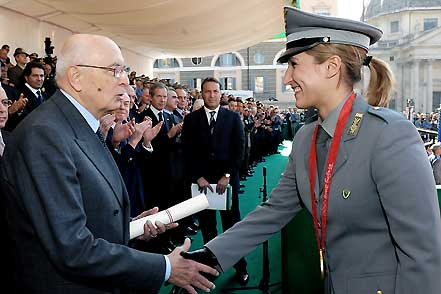
Chiara Cainero (Gruppo Sportivo Forestale), awarded by the Italian president Giorgio Napolitano.

The Italian military sports corps (Italian: Corpi Sportivi Militari Italiani, abbreviated C.S.), are the sports sections of the Italian Armed Forces and Polizia.

== Athletes ==
Athletes affiliated with one of the military sports bodies receive a rank and salary equivalent to servicemen. They also receive basic military training, although the majority of their training is sport-specific and usually takes place in one of the military sports centers. 194 of the 290 athletes that represented Italy at the 2012 Summer Olympics belonged to a military sports body.

== Corpi Sportivi ==
The Corpi Sportivi (military sports bodies), in Italy are affiliated with Italian National Olympic Committee (CONI).

Sport body	Force	Founded	Notes
Armed forces
C.S. Esercito	Italian Army	1960	
G.S. Marina Militare	Italian Navy	1952	
C.S. Aeronautica Militare	Italian Air Force	1964	
C.S. Carabinieri	Carabinieri	1964	
Police forces
G.S. Fiamme Oro	Polizia di Stato	1954	
G.S. Fiamme Gialle	Guardia di Finanza	1881	
G.S. Fiamme Azzurre	Polizia Penitenziaria	1983	
Firefighters
G.S. Fiamme Rosse	Vigili del Fuoco	2013	
Old bodies
G.S. Forestale	State Forestry Corps	1955	In 2017 it joined the C.S. Carabinieri.

== See also ==
- Italian Armed Forces
- Italian National Olympic Committee
