= Martine Veldhuis =

Dutch rower (born 1996)

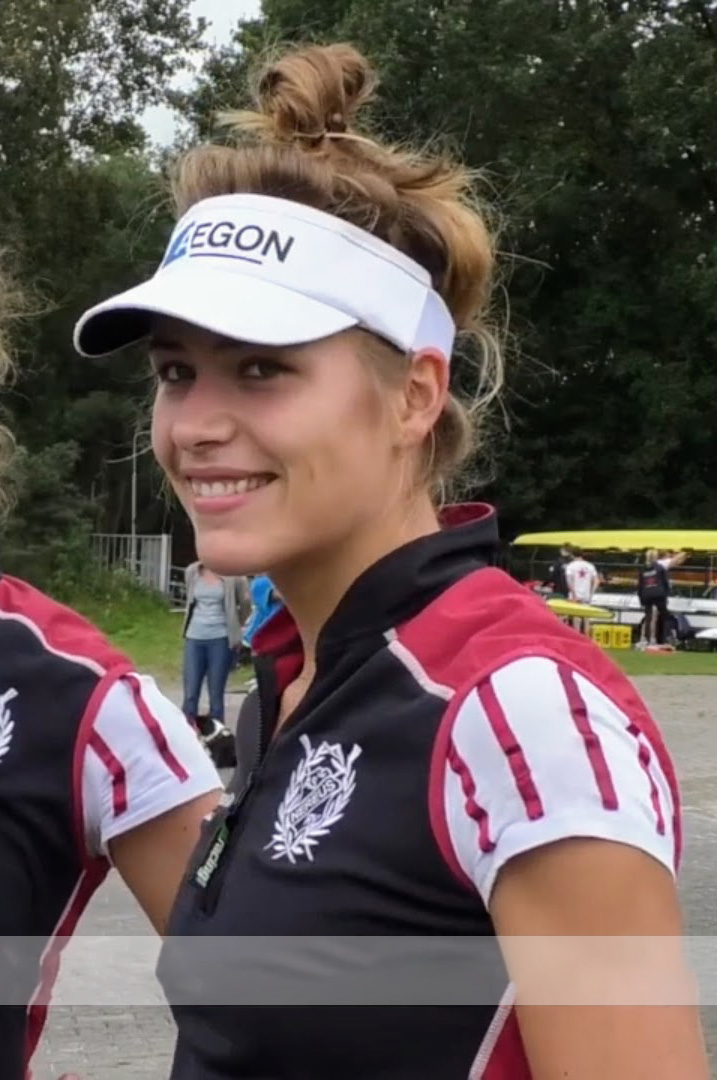

Personal information
- Born: 12 December 1996 (age 29)

Sport
- Country: Netherlands
- Sport: Rowing
Medal record
Women's rowing
Representing the Netherlands
World Championships
Silver medal – second place	2022 Račice	LW1x
European Championships
Gold medal – first place	2020 Poznań	LW1x
Silver medal – second place	2023 Bled	Quadruple sculls
Bronze medal – third place	2022 Munich	LW1x

Martine Veldhuis (born 12 December 1996) is a Dutch rower. In 2017, she and her dizygotic twin sister Marike won silver at the World Rowing Championships for under-23 rowers in the lightweight quadruple sculls. She won the gold medal in the women's lightweight single sculls event at the 2020 European Rowing Championships held in Poznań, Poland. This was the first time the Netherlands won this event at the European Rowing Championships.

In 2018, she competed in the women's lightweight single sculls event at the World Rowing Championships held in Plovdiv, Bulgaria. The following year, she competed in the same event at the 2019 World Rowing Championships held in Ottensheim, Austria.

Veldhuis and Lisa Scheenaard competed in the women's double sculls event at the 2024 Summer Olympics in Paris, France.
