= Giovanna Schettino =

Italian rower

Personal information
- National team: Italy
- Born: 26 February 1998 (age 28) Castellammare di Stabia, Italy

Sport
- Sport: Rowing
- Club: Circolo Canottieri Aniene
Medal record
Event	1st	2nd	3rd
World Championships	1	0	0

Giovanna Schettino (born 26 February 1998) is an Italian lightweight rower world champion at senior level at the World Rowing Championships.

== Biography ==
Schettino started the activity in 2012, having her senior debut in 2017. In addition to the international medal won at a senior level, at the youth level she won four more medals between world and European championships.

== Achievements ==
Year	Competition	Venue	Rank	Event	Time	Notes
2017	World Championships	(United States) Sarasota	1st	Lightweight quadruple sculls	6:33.97	
