= Sarah Pound =

Australian rower

Personal information
- Born: 13 October 1991 (age 35)
- Height: 167 cm (5 ft 6 in)
- Weight: 57 kg (126 lb)

Sport
- Country: Australia
- Sport: Rowing
- Club: UTS Haberfield Rowing Club

Achievements and titles
- National finals: Victoria Cup 2010-18
Medal record
Women's rowing
Representing Australia
World Rowing Championships
Silver medal – second place	2014 Amsterdam	LW4X
World Rowing U23 Championships
Silver medal – second place	2013 Linz	LW4X

Sarah Pound (born 13 October 1991) is an Australian former representative lightweight rower. She is a three-time national champion and won a silver medal at the 2014 World Rowing Championships.

== Club and state rowing ==
Pound rows from the UTS Haberfield Rowing Club in Sydney.

Pound made her first state representative appearance for New South Wales, at stroke in the 2011 women's lightweight quad scull which contested the Victoria Cup at the Interstate Regatta within the Australian Rowing Championships. She made a total of seven Victoria Cup appearances for New South Wales between 2010 and 2018. She stroked those quads in 2011, 2015 and 2018 and to victory in 2018.

In 2014 in UTS Haberfield colours she contested the final of the lightweight single sculls title at the Australian Rowing Championships finishing seventh. In 2015 with Laura Dunn and racing for UTS Haberfield Rowing Club she won the national title in a lightweight coxless pair at the Australian Rowing Championships. At those same championships she also won the lightweight quad scull national title. In 2021 she stroked the New South Wales women's lightweight quad to a 3rd placing in the Victoria Cup at the Australian Interstate regatta and she placed second in chasing the open lightweight women's single scull national title.

== International representative rowing ==
Pound made her Australian representative debut as a lightweight single sculler at the World Rowing Cup I in Sydney in 2013. She rowed to a third place. That year she was selected in the Australian U23 quad scull which raced at the 2013 World Rowing U23 Championships in Linz, Austria. That crew won a silver medal.

In 2014 she again raced in a single scull at the World Rowing Cup I in Sydney, she finished fifth. She was elevated to the Australian senior lightweight quad scull to contest the 2014 World Rowing Championships in Amsterdam. She rowed in that crew stroked by the veteran lightweight Hannah Every-Hall to a silver medal with Maia Simmonds and Laura Dunn.

In 2015 Simmonds took over the stroke seat in the lightweight quad scull from Every-Hall, Dunn and Pound held their seats and Georgia Miansarow joined the crew. They rowed to a fourth placing at the 2015 World Rowing Championships in Aiguebelette.

In 2016 she raced a lightweight single scull at the World Rowing Cup II in Lucerne but did not make the squad for the 2016 World Championships. In 2018 she was back in senior representative contention and rowed in the Australian lightweight quad to a fifth place at the World Rowing Cup II in Lucerne. She was selected with Amy James to race Australia's lightweight double scull at the 2018 World Rowing Championships in Plodiv. Pound and James placed second in their heat, progressing through to the semi-final.

In 2019 Pound was selected to row Australia's lightweight double scull for the 2019 international season. With Alice Arch she placed 14th at the World Rowing Cup II in Poznan and 8th at WRC III in Rotterdam and was then selected with Georgia Nesbitt to race at the 2019 World Rowing Championships in Linz, Austria. The double were looking for a top seven finish at the 2019 World Championships to qualify for the Tokyo Olympics. They placed third in the B-final for an overall ninth-place finish and failed to qualify the boat for Tokyo 2020. Before those delayed Tokyo Olympics at the final Olympic qualification regatta in Lucerne, Switzerland in May 2021 and again paired with Nesbitt, she raced an Australian representative lightweight double, again attempting to qualify that boat. They made their final, finished in 6th place and missed the Olympic cut-off.
