= Maia Simmonds =

Australian rower

Personal information
- Born: 8 June 1986 (age 40)

Sport
- Country: Australia
- Sport: Rowing

Achievements and titles
- National finals: Victoria Cup 2011-16; King's Cup 2015-16
Medal record
Women's rowing
Representing Australia
World Rowing Championships
Silver medal – second place	2014 Amsterdam	LW4X

Maia Simmonds (born 8 June 1986 in Perth) is an Australian former representative rower. She is a three-time national champion, rowed for her home state of Western Australia in both lightweight and heavyweight crews, in sculling and sweep-oared boats and won a silver medal at the 2014 World Rowing Championships.

== Club and state rowing ==
Raised in Perth, Simmond's senior rowing club rowing was from the University of Western Australia. In 2010 she rowed in the Uni of WA women's eight which won the Intervarsity Championship at the 2010 Australian Universities Championships.

Simmonds made her first state representative appearance for Western Australia, in the 2011 women's lightweight quad scull which contested the Victoria Cup and placed second at the Interstate Regatta within the Australian Rowing Championships. In 2012 and 2013 she rowed in victorious West Australian quads which won the Victoria Cup national title at the Interstate Regatta. She stroked the winning 2013 crew and stroked further West Australian Victoria Cup quads in 2014, 2015 and 2016. In 2015 and 2016 she rowed in Western Australia's heavyweight women's eights contesting the Queen's Cup at the Interstate Regatta.

In 2014 in Uni of WA colours she contested the open lightweight single sculls national title at the Australian Rowing Championships and placed fourth. In 2015 she won the national title in a coxless pair with Megan Bagworth at the Australian Rowing Championships. She also contested the lightweight double scull at those championships and placed second with Janelle Austin.

== International representative rowing ==
Simmonds made her Australian representative debut in the lightweight quad scull contesting the 2011 World Rowing Championships in Bled. They rowed to a sixth placing. She held her seat in that crew into 2012 when they contested the World Championships in Plovdiv and finished in fifth place.

In 2013 Simmonds moved into the Australian lightweight double scull with Alice McNamara. They raced at the World Rowing Cup I in Sydney and then at the 2013 World Rowing Championships in Chungju, they missed the A final and placed overall seventh. In 2014 Simmonds was in contention for various lightweight sculling crews. She rowed in the double with the veteran lightweight Hannah Every-Hall to gold at the World Rowing Cup I in Sydney and then at two further WRCs in Europe she raced as a single sculler to the B finals time. Simmonds and Every-Hall made the Australian quad scull for the 2014 World Rowing Championships in Amsterdam and rowed that boat to a silver medal with Sarah Pound and Laura Dunn.

In 2015 Simmonds took over the stroke seat in the lightweight quad scull from Every-Hall and Georgia Miansarow joined the crew. Simmonds stroked the quad to a fourth placing at the 2015 World Rowing Championships in Aiguebelette. It was Simmonds' last Australian representative appearance.
