= Georgia Miansarow =

Australian rower

Personal information
- Born: 31 August 1992 (age 33) England
- Home town: Sydney, New South Wales, Australia
- Height: 172 cm (5 ft 8 in)
- Weight: 59 kg (130 lb)

Sport
- Country: Australia
- Sport: Rowing
- Club: Mosman Rowing Club; Sydney University Boat Club
- Coached by: John Keogh, Tom Westgarth, Ellen Randell

Achievements and titles
- National finals: Bicentennial Cup 2012; Victoria Cup 2014-18
Medal record
Women's rowing
Representing Australia
World Rowing Championships
| Silver medal – second place | 2017 Sarasota | LW4X |
World Rowing U23 Championships
| Bronze medal – third place | 2014 Varese | BLW2X |

Georgia Miansarow (born 31 August 1992) is an English born, Australian representative lightweight rower. She is a three-time national champion and won medals at both World Rowing U23 Championships and senior World Rowing Championships in crewed sculling boats.

== Club and state rowing ==
Raised in England, Miansarow rowed at school and then relocated to Sydney with her Australian mother and British father in 2011 aged 19. Her senior rowing in Australia was initially from the Mosman Rowing Club and later the Sydney University Boat Club.

She made her first state representative appearance for New South Wales, in the 2012 women's youth eight which contested and won the Bicentennial Cup at the Interstate Regatta within the Australian Rowing Championships. In 2014 she moved into the New South Wales lightweight quad contesting the Victoria Cup, and she rowed in that event on four occasions between 2014 and 2018 and then again in 2023. Those New South Wales' winning quads were victorious in 2018 and 2023.

In 2014 with Laura Dunn and racing for Mosman Rowing Club she won the national title in a lightweight double scull at the Australian Rowing Championships. At those same championships she won the lightweight quad scull national title in an Australian selection composite crew. At the Australian Championships in 2015 she placed second behind Georgia Nesbitt racing for the national lightweight single sculls title.

== International representative rowing ==
Miansarow made her Australian representative debut in 2013 in an U23 lightweight double scull. She rowed with Georgia Nesbitt to a fifth place at the World Rowing U23 Championships in Linz. That same year with Nesbitt, Hannah Clarke and Alex Hayes she was selected in the Australian senior lightweight quad scull which raced at 2013 World Rowing Championships in Chungju to fifth place.

In 2014 still paired with Nesbitt she raced in the lightweight double scull at the World Rowing Cup III in Lucerne to fifth place. Then at the 2014 World Rowing U23 Championships in Varese the two Georgias rowed the double to a bronze medal.

In 2015 Miansarow joined the senior Australian lightweight quad of Maia Simmonds, Sarah Pound and Laura Dunn which had won a silver medal the year before. Miansarow replaced the veteran Hannah Every-Hall and they rowed to a fourth placing at the 2015 World Rowing Championships in Aiguebelette.

Miansarow was back in Australian representative contention in 2017. She rowed in the lightweight double at the World Rowing Cup II in Poznan to sixth place and then at the WRC III in Lucerne with Amy James, Alice Arch and Nesbitt they raced in both the lightweight and the heavyweight quad events, winning the lightweight. They were in ready form for the 2017 World Rowing Championships in Sarasota where they rowed to a second placing and a silver medal.

That crew stayed together into 2018. They raced as doubles at the WRC II in Linz where the two Georgias finished 14th and then at the WRC III in Lucerne with Arch changed out for Sarah Pound, the quad placed fifth.

In March 2023 Miansarow was selected as a sculling reserve in the Australian women's lightweight squad for the 2023 international season. She raced as Australia's lightweight single scull entrant at the World Rowing Cup III in Lucerne making the A final and finishing in fourth place.
