= Rowing at the 2015 Pan American Games – Women's lightweight single sculls =

Rowing – Women's lightweight single sculls at the 2015 Pan American Games
- Venue: Royal Canadian Henley Rowing Course
- Dates: July 12 - July 15
- Competitors: 9 from 9 nations
- Winning time Final A: 8:49.19

Medalists
Gold medal	Mary Jones	United States
Silver medal	Fabiana Beltrame	Brazil
Bronze medal	Lucia Palermo	Argentina

The women's lightweight single sculls rowing event at the 2015 Pan American Games was held from July 12–15 at the Royal Canadian Henley Rowing Course in St. Catharines.

== Schedule ==
All times are Eastern Standard Time (UTC-3).

Date	Time	Round
July 12, 2015	10:15	Heat 1
July 12, 2015	10:25	Heat 2
July 12, 2015	14:35	Repechage
July 15, 2015	9:05	Final B
July 15, 2015	9:55	Final A

== Results ==
=== Heats ===
==== Heat 1 ====
Rank	Rowers	Country	Time	Notes
1	Fabiana Beltrame	Brazil	7:36.28	FA
2	Lucia Palermo	Argentina	7:53.81	FA
3	Liz Fenje	Canada	7:55.59	R
4	Jenesis Perez Pastran	Venezuela	8:20.23	R
5	Jennieffer Mazariegos	Guatemala	8:20.75	R

==== Heat 2 ====
Rank	Rowers	Country	Time	Notes
1	Mary Jones	United States	7:43.34	FA
2	Kenia Lechuga	Mexico	7:53.53	FA
3	Yislena Hernandez	Cuba	8:17.78	R
4	Gabriela Mosqueira	Paraguay	8:20.42	R

=== Repechage ===
Rank	Rowers	Country	Time	Notes
1	Liz Fenje	Canada	8:28.82	FA
2	Yislena Hernandez	Cuba	8:42.19	FA
3	Gabriela Mosqueira	Paraguay	8:50.50	FB
4	Jennieffer Mazariegos	Guatemala	8:57.12	FB
5	Jenesis Perez Pastran	Venezuela	9:06.50	FB

=== Finals ===
==== Final B ====
Rank	Rowers	Country	Time	Notes
7	Gabriela Mosqueira	Paraguay	9:57.20	
8	Jenesis Perez Pastran	Venezuela	10:24.78	
9	Jennieffer Mazariegos	Guatemala	10:25.95	

==== Final A ====
Rank	Rowers	Country	Time	Notes
1st place, gold medalist(s)	Mary Jones	United States	8:49.19	
2nd place, silver medalist(s)	Fabiana Beltrame	Brazil	8:54.36	
3rd place, bronze medalist(s)	Lucia Palermo	Argentina	9:01.16	
4	Kenia Lechuga	Mexico	9:01.42	
5	Liz Fenje	Canada	9:11.22	
6	Yislena Hernandez	Cuba	9:20.97	
