= Gruppo Sportivo Fiamme Rosse =

- Sport: 8 disciplines
- Jurisdiction: Italy
- Abbreviation: G.S. Fiamme Rosse
- Founded: 2013
- Affiliation: CONI
- Location: Rome, Italy
- President: Fabrizio Santamgelo

Official website
- vigilfuoco.it

The Gruppo Sportivo Fiamme Rosse is the sport section of the Italian firefighter force Vigili del Fuoco.

== History ==
The vigili del fuoco (in english firefighters) have been engaged in sports since 1919 when they still called themselves Civici pompieri.

== Sports ==
- Rowing
- Wrestling
- Swimming
- Weightlifting
- Fencing
- Taekwondo
- Skeet shooting
- Diving

== Main active athletes ==
Athlete	Sport	Best result
Simona Quadarella	Swimming	Gold medal at world and European championships at senior level
Paola Piazzolla	Rowing	Gold medal at world championships at senior level
Arianna Noseda	Rowing	Gold medal at world championships at senior level
Eleonora Trivella	Rowing	Bronze medal at world championships at senior level
Alessandra Pagliaro	Weightlifting	Bronze medal at European championships at senior level
Simone Alessio	Taekwondo	Gold medal at the world championships at senior level

== See also ==
- Vigili del Fuoco
- Italian military sports bodies
