= Asja Maregotto =

Italian female rower

Personal information
- National team: Italy
- Born: 9 January 1997 (age 29) Camposampiero, Italy

Sport
- Sport: Rowing
- Club: Padova SC
Medal record
Event	1st	2nd	3rd
World Championships	1	0	0

Asja Maregotto (born 9 January 1997) is an Italian lightweight rower world champion at senior level at the World Rowing Championships.

== Biography ==
Maregotto started the activity in 2009, having her senior debut in 2017. In addition to the international medal won at a senior level, at the youth level she won two more medals.

== Achievements ==
Year	Competition	Venue	Rank	Event	Time
2017	World Championships	(United States) Sarasota	1st	Lightweight quadruple sculls	6:33.97
