= Centro Sportivo Carabinieri =

Sports section of the Italian armed force Carabinieri

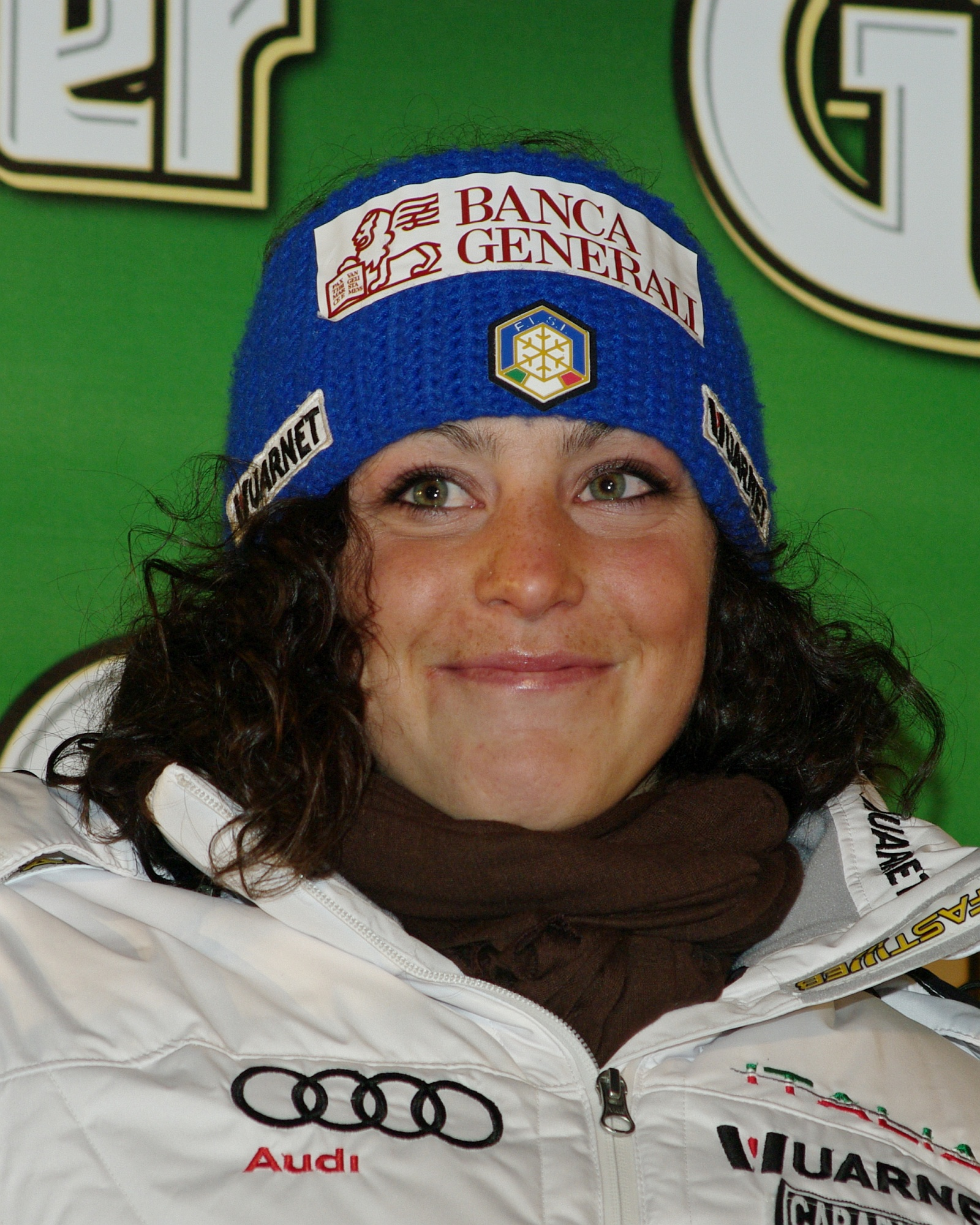
- Sport: 21 disciplines
- Jurisdiction: Italy
- Abbreviation: C.S. Carabinieri
- Founded: 1964
- Affiliation: CONI
- Headquarters: Bologna
- President: Col. Paolo Galvaligi.

Official website
- www.carabinieri.it
- (Italy)

The Centro Sportivo Carabinieri (also known as Carabinieri Bologna), is the sport section of the Italian armed force Carabinieri.

== Sports ==
The disciplines of C.S. Carabinieri include:

- Athletics
- Fencing
- Alpine skiing
- Cross-country skiing
- Biathlon
- Luge
- Bobsleigh
- Shooting
- Swimming
- Diving
- Surf lifesaving
- Finswimming
- Open water swimming
- Rowing
- Equestrianism
- Triathlon
- Modern pentathlon
- Judo
- Karate
- Parachuting

== Medal table ==
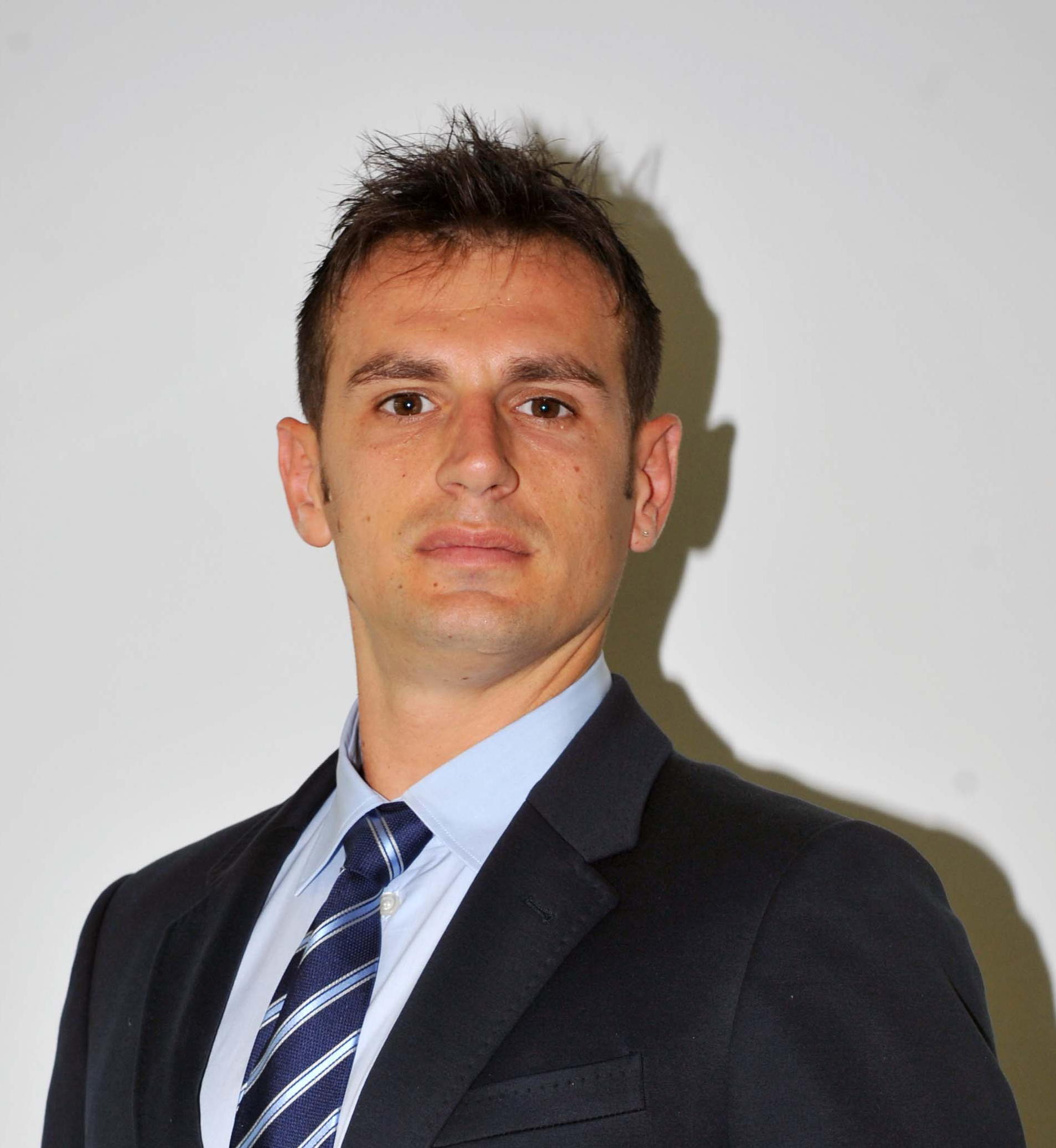
Carlo Molfetta Olympic champion in Taekwondo at the 2012 Summer Olympics.

Update at the 4 May 2020.

Event	1st place, gold medalist(s)	2nd place, silver medalist(s)	3rd place, bronze medalist(s)
Olympic Games	31	28	38
World championships	90	100	110
European championships	98	103	161
Military World Games	185	138	172
Mediterranean Games	32	29	24
Universiade	21	24	29
Italian championships	2,147	2,123	1,783
Total	2,604	2,544	2,315

== All-time notable athletes ==
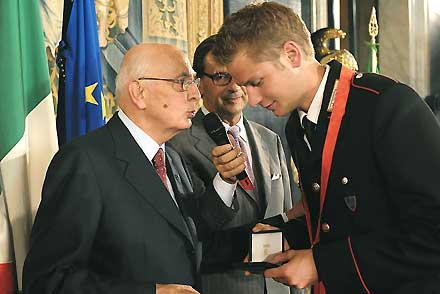
Alex Schwazer awarded by the Italian president Giorgio Napolitano.

Alpine skiing

- Federica Brignone
- Giorgio Rocca
- Alberto Tomba

Athletics

- Michele Didoni
- Alex Schwazer

Biathlon

- Lukas Hofer

Bobsleigh

- Günther Huber
- Antonio Tartaglia

Cross-country skiing

- Pietro Piller Cottrer
- Giorgio Di Centa
- Silvio Fauner

Equestrianism

- Raimondo D'Inzeo

Fencing

- Michele Maffei
- Mauro Numa
- Salvatore Sanzo
- Arianna Errigo

Luge

- Armin Zöggeler

Swimming

- Marcello Guarducci

Taekwondo

- Vito Dell'Aquila

== See also ==
- Italian military sports bodies
