= Laura Dunn (rower) =

Australian former lightweight rower

Personal information
- Born: 10 November 1987 (age 38)

Sport
- Country: Australia
- Sport: Rowing
- Club: UTS Haberfield Rowing Club

Achievements and titles
- National finals: Victoria Cup 2010 - 16
Medal record
Women's rowing
Representing Australia
World Rowing Championships
Silver medal – second place	2014 Amsterdam	LW4X

Laura Dunn (born 10 November 1987 in Belmont, New South Wales) is an Australian former lightweight rower. She is a three-time national champion and won a silver medal at the 2014 World Rowing Championships.

== Club and state rowing ==
Raised in Belmont in the Hunter Region of New South Wales, Dunn attended Warners Bay High School and the Hunter School of Performing Arts before studying at the University of Technology Sydney and taking up rowing at the UTS Haberfield Rowing Club.

Dunn made her first state representative appearance for New South Wales, at stroke in the 2010 women's lightweight quad scull which contested the Victoria Cup at the Interstate Regatta within the Australian Rowing Championships. She made a total of six Victoria Cup appearances for New South Wales between 2010 and 2016. She stroked those quads in 2010, 2013 and 2016.

In 2013 in UTS Haberfield colours at the Australian Rowing Championships she placed second in her lightweight double sculls title attempt behind a Chinese national crew and she won the lightweight quad sculls national title. In 2014 in UTS Haberfield colours she contested the open lightweight single sculls national title at the Australian Rowing Championships and placed eighth in the A final. At those same 2014 championships she placed second in the lightweight double sculls title behind a Czech national crew and she won the lightweight quad sculls national title. In 2015 with Sarah Pound and racing for UTS Haberfield Rowing Club she won the national title in a lightweight coxless pair at the Australian Rowing Championships. At those same championships she also won the lightweight quad scull national title.

== International representative rowing ==
Dunn made her Australian representative debut in the lightweight quad scull contesting the 2014 World Rowing Championships in Amsterdam. She rowed in that crew stroked by the veteran lightweight Hannah Every-Hall to a silver medal with Maia Simmonds and Sarah Pound.

In 2015 Simmonds took over the stroke seat in the lightweight quad scull from Every-Hall, Dunn and Pound held their seats and Georgia Miansarow joined the crew. They rowed to a fourth placing at the 2015 World Rowing Championships in Aiguebelette. It was Dunn's last Australian representative appearance.
