= Jaclyn Stelmaszyk =

Polish Canadian rower

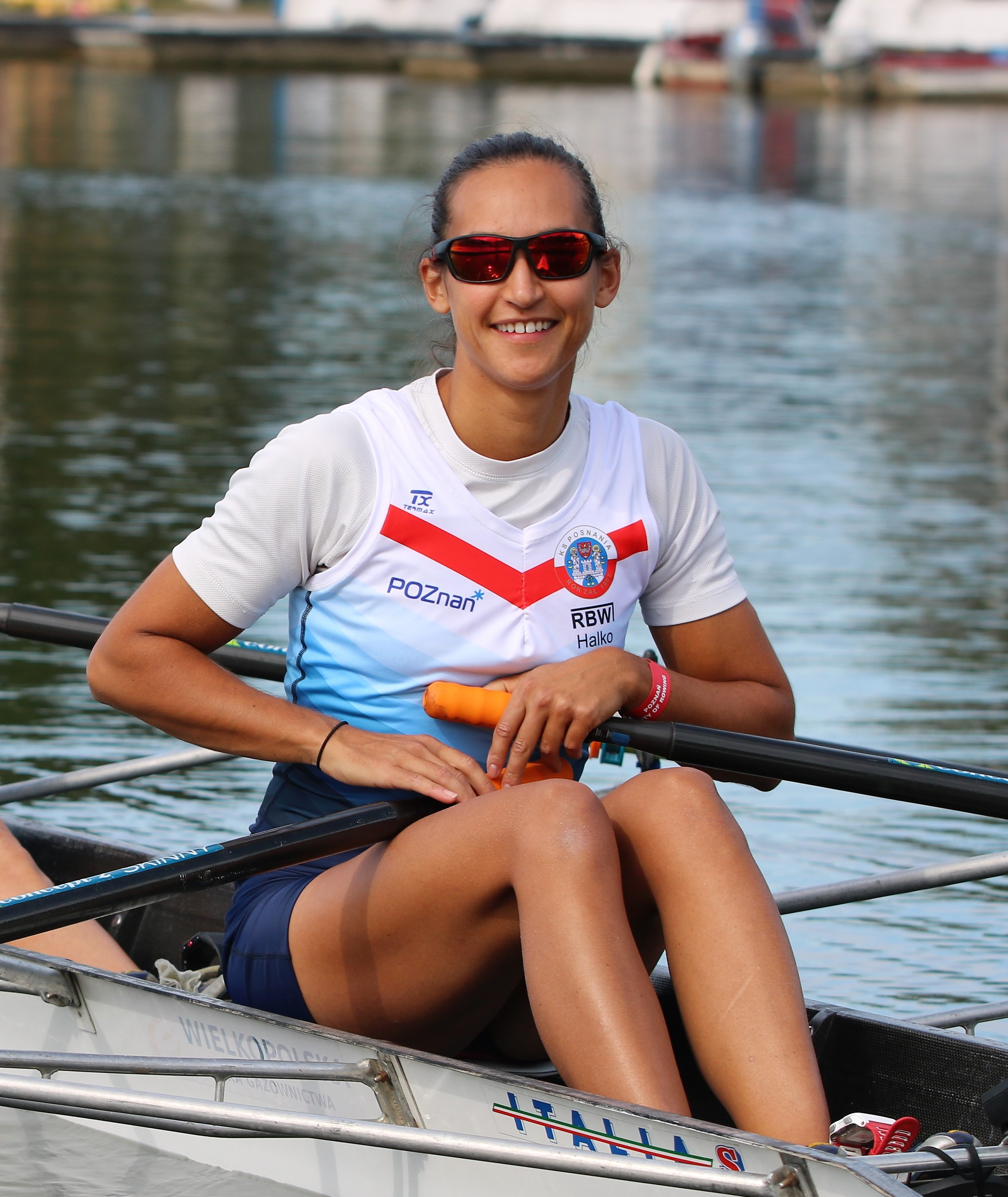
- Stelmaszyk in 2020

Personal information
- Born: December 16, 1986 (age 39) Toronto, Ontario
- Height: 171 cm (5 ft 7 in)
- Weight: 59 kg (130 lb)

Sport
- College team: University of Western Ontario
Medal record
Women's rowing
Representing Poland
World Rowing Championships
Gold medal – first place	2012 Plovdiv	LW4x
Representing Canada
Pan American Games
Gold medal – first place	2019 Lima	LW2x

Jaclyn Halko (born December 16, 1986) is a Polish Canadian world champion rower. She won gold in the lightweight women's quad sculls at the 2012 World Rowing Championships as a competitor for Poland. Halko returned to the Canadian team and is the reigning Pan American Games Champion, winning gold in the lightweight women's double sculls with Kate Haber at the 2019 Pan American Games in Lima. In December 2019, Jaclyn was granted an exemption to the three year rule by the Olympic executive board to change nationalities from Canada to Poland. She immediately began training with the Polish Rowing Federation (PZTW) in hopes of qualifying a lightweight double boat for the 2020 Tokyo Olympic games.
