= Giulia Pollini =

Italian female rower

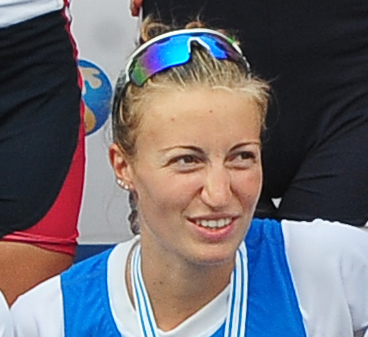
- Pollini in 2013.

Personal information
- National team: Italy
- Born: 8 March 1988 (age 38) Como, Italy
- Height: 1.68 m (5 ft 6 in)
- Weight: 58 kg (128 lb)

Sport
- Sport: Rowing
- Club: Cernobbio S.C.; Canottieri Moltrasio
- Coached by: Gianbattista Della Porta
Medal record
Event	1st	2nd	3rd
World Championships	0	0	2
World U23 Championships	1	0	0
Total	1	0	2

Giulia Pollini (born 8 March 1988) is an Italian lightweight rower twice bronze medal winner at senior level at the World Rowing Championships.

== Achievements ==
Year	Competition	Venue	Rank	Event	Time
2012	World Championships	(Bulgaria) Plovdiv	3rd	Lightweight quadruple sculls	6:39.13
2013	World Championships	(South Korea) Chungju	3rd	Lightweight quadruple sculls	6:57.06
