= Kate Haber =

Canadian rower (born 1984)

Personal information
- Nationality: Canada
- Born: Kate Sauks; August 31, 1984 (age 41) Toronto, Ontario
- Height: 168 cm (5 ft 6 in)
- Weight: 59 kg (130 lb)

Sport
- College team: Toronto
Medal record
Women's rowing
Representing Canada
World Rowing Championships
Bronze medal – third place	2016 Rotterdam	LW1x
Pan American Games
Gold medal – first place	2015 Toronto	LW2x
Gold medal – first place	2019 Lima	LW2x

Kate Haber (née Sauks; born August 31, 1984) is a Canadian national rower. She won bronze at the 2016 World Rowing Championships in Rotterdam while competing in the lightweight women's sculls. Haber is the reigning two-time Pan American Games Champion when she won gold in lightweight women's double sculls with gold with Liz Fenje at the 2015 Pan American Games in Toronto, and Jaclyn Stelmaszyk at the 2019 Pan Am Games in Lima. She started rowing at the University of Toronto after injuries from her track and field days in the pole vault and pentathlon events forced her to move to a new sport. Haber has her PhD in Rehabilitation Sciences and Anatomy from the University of Toronto.
