= Amy James =

Australian rower

Personal information
- Born: 29 July 1993 (age 32)

Sport
- Country: Australia
- Sport: Rowing
- Club: Toowong Rowing Club
Medal record
Women's rowing
Representing Australia
World Rowing Championships
Silver medal – second place	2017 Sarasota	LW4X

Amy James (born 29 July 1993) is an Australian representative lightweight rower. She is a two-time national champion and won a silver medal at the 2017 World Rowing Championships.

== Club and state rowing ==
James' senior club rowing has been from the Toowong Rowing Club.

James first made state selection for Queensland in 2011 in the women's lightweight quad scull which contested and won the Victoria Cup at the Interstate Regatta within the Australian Rowing Championships. She rowed again in 2012 in the Victoria Cup for Queensland. In 2016 she regained her seat in the Queensland lightweight quad contesting the Victoria Cup and stroked that crew to a second place. She was seated at two in the victorious 2017 crew and held that same seat in 2018.

At the Australian Championships in 2016 in Toowong colours she contested the national open quad scull title and placed second behind a Chinese selection crew.

== International representative rowing ==
James made her Australian representative debut in 2011 at age eighteen in the U23 lightweight quad scull which raced at the World Rowing U23 Championships in Amsterdam. They missed the A final and finished in overall eighth place. In 2015 she was back in the U23 representative squad in a lightweight double scull. She rowed with Holly Lawrence to a seventh place at the World Rowing U23 Championships in Plovdiv.

In 2017 James stepped up to the Australian senior squad. She rowed in a lightweight double at the World Rowing Cup II in Poznan to sixth place with Georgia Miansarow and then at the WRC III in Lucerne with Miansarow, Georgia Nesbitt and Alice Arch they raced in both the lightweight and the heavyweight quad events, winning the lightweight. They were in ready form for the 2017 World Rowing Championships in Sarasota where they rowed to a second placing and a silver medal.

That crew stayed together into 2018. They raced as two doubles at the WRC II in Linz where James and Arch finished 11th. Then at the WRC III in Lucerne with Arch changed out for Sarah Pound they placed fifth as a quad. She was selected with Sarah Pound to race Australia's lightweight double scull at the 2018 World Rowing Championships in Plodiv. Pound and James placed second in their heat, progressing through to the semi-final.
