= Paola Piazzolla =

Italian female rower

Personal information
- National team: Italy
- Born: 21 October 1996 (age 29) Canosa di Puglia, Italy

Sport
- Sport: Rowing
- Club: Fiamme Rosse
Medal record
Event	1st	2nd	3rd
World Championships	1	0	0

Paola Piazzolla (born 21 October 1996) is an Italian lightweight rower world champion at senior level at the World Rowing Championships.

== Biography ==
Maregotto started the activity in 2008, having her senior debut in 2017. In addition to the international medal won at a senior level, at the youth level she won three more medals.

== Achievements ==
Year	Competition	Venue	Rank	Event	Time
2017	World Championships	(United States) Sarasota	1st	Lightweight quadruple sculls	6:33.97
