= Lisa Wörner =

Dutch rower

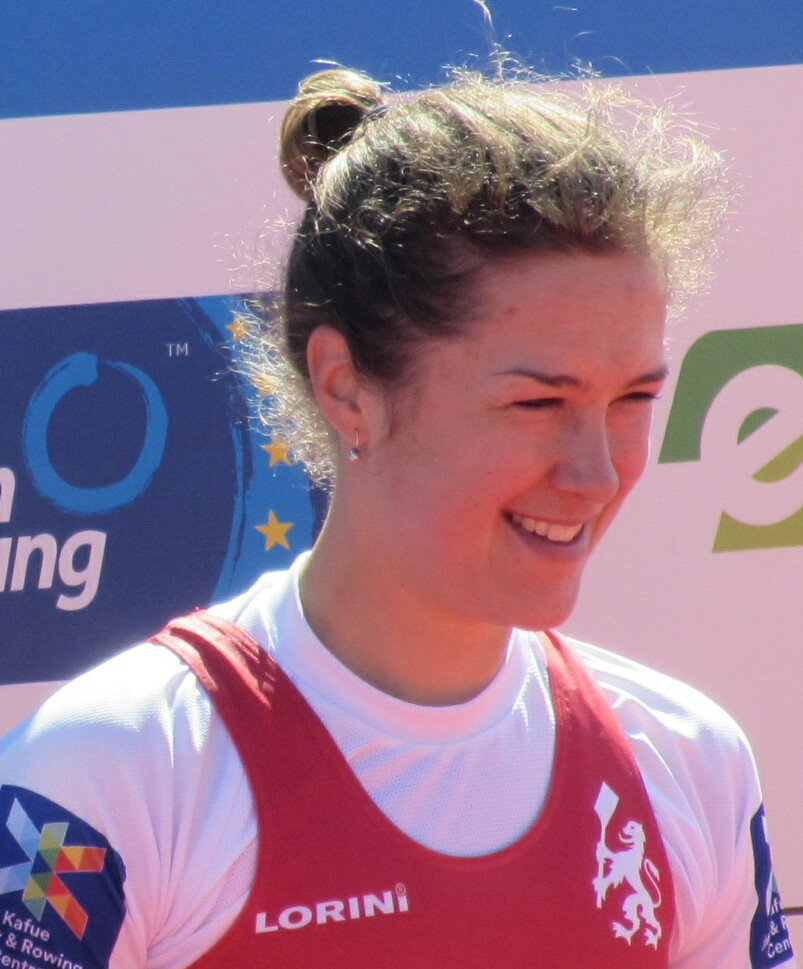

Personal information
- Born: 8 March 1990 (age 36) Amsterdam, Netherlands
- Height: 170 cm (5 ft 7 in)
- Weight: 57 kg (126 lb)
Medal record
Women's rowing
Representing the Netherlands
World Championships
Gold medal – first place	2014 Amsterdam	LW4x
Bronze medal – third place	2015 Aiguebelette	LW4x
European Championships
Bronze medal – third place	2016 Brandenburg	Lwt single sculls

Elisabeth Wörner (born 8 March 1990) is a Dutch rower and cyclist.

Wörner was part of Netherlands' team which set a world record in lightweight women's quadruple sculls (6 minutes 15.95 seconds) at the 2014 World Rowing Championships in Amsterdam on 29 August 2014.

She finished third in the LW4x event at the 2015 World Rowing Championships in Aiguebelette-le-Lac on 4 September 2015.
