= Vigili del Fuoco =

Italian fire and rescue service

- Logo of the Corps

- Coat of Arms of the Corps

Operational area
- Country: Italy

Agency overview
- Established: 27 February 1939
- Employees: 35,000
- Commissioner: Attilio Visconti
- Fire chief: Eros Mannino
- Motto: Flammas Domamus Donamus Corda (We tame the flame, we give our hearts)

Facilities and equipment
- Divisions: 20 regional
- Stations: 500 on the territory

Website
- www.vigilifuoco.it

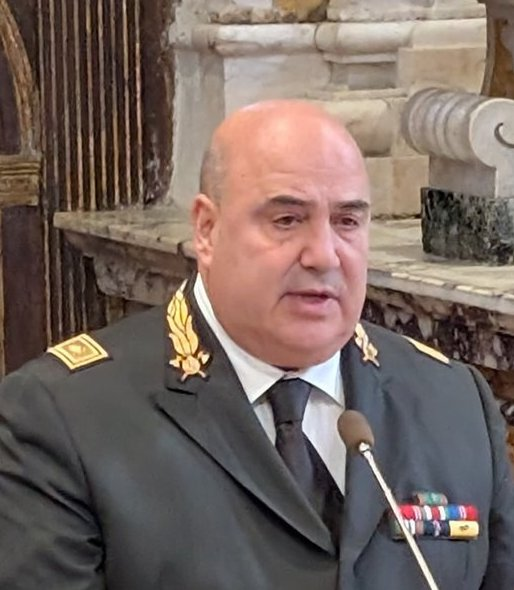
Dirigente generale Capo del Corpo Eros Mannino in uniform

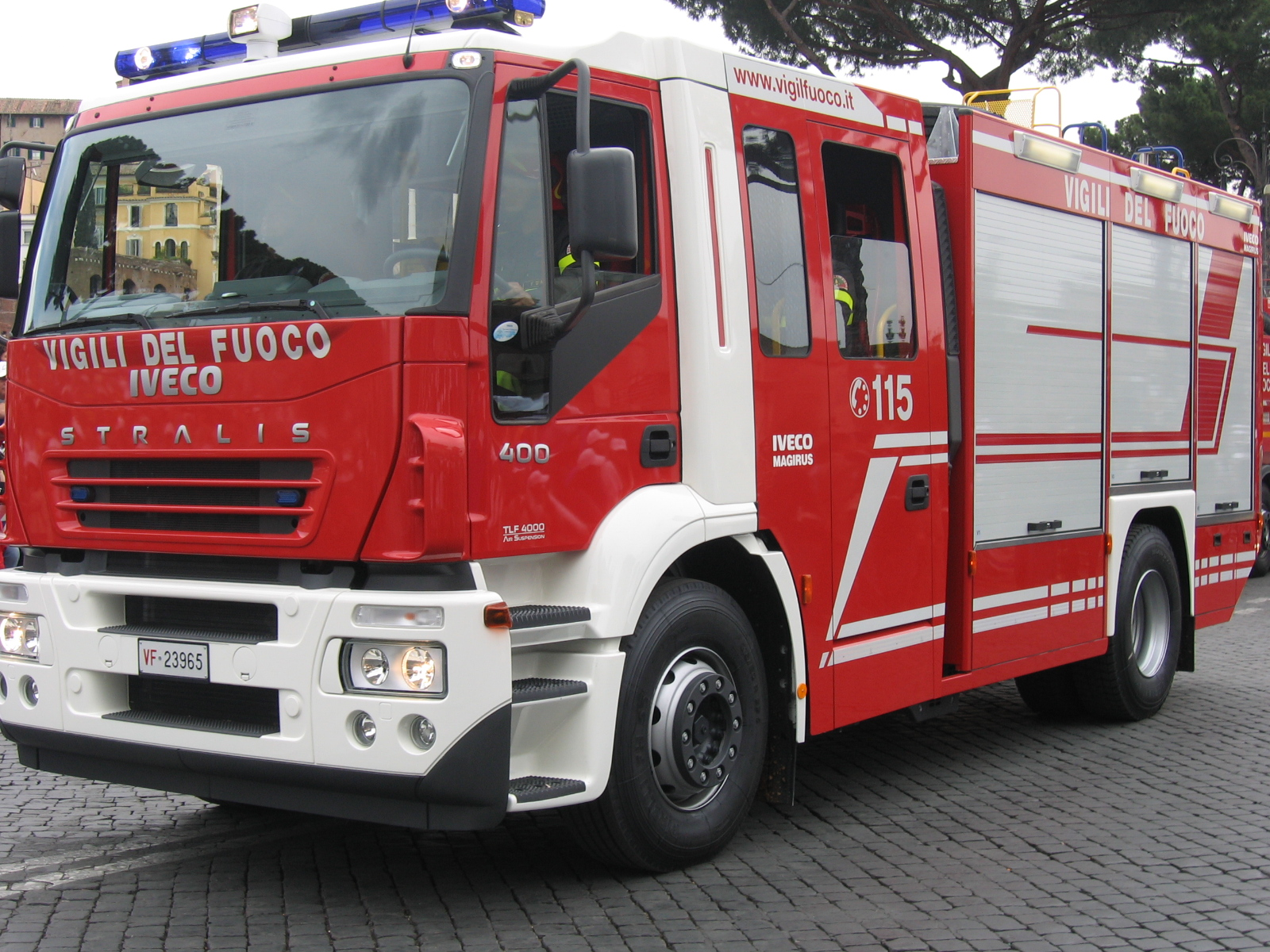
Italian Fire Service Iveco Magirus Eurofire Stralis AT400

The Vigili del Fuoco (Italian: [viˈd͡ʒi.li del ˈfwɔ.ko]) is Italy's institutional agency for fire and rescue service. It is part of the Ministry of Interior's Dipartimento dei Vigili del Fuoco, del Soccorso Pubblico e della Difesa Civile (Department of Firefighters, Public Rescue and Civil(ian) Protection). The Corps' task is to provide safety for people, animals, and property, and to give technical assistance to industries, as well as providing fire prevention advice. It also ensures public safety in terrorist emergencies such as chemical, bacteriological, radiological, and nuclear attacks.

Extreme weather events, such as droughts and floods, are also increasing in Italy due to global warming. The frequency of wildfires is also increasing. Tectonically, Italy is frequently affected by earthquakes. The Corpo nazionale dei vigili del fuoco is a central force in the disaster management and civil protection of the country.

The word Vigili comes from the Latin word Vigiles, which means "who is part of certain guards". The complete official name is Corpo Nazionale dei Vigili del Fuoco (CNVVF, National Firefighters Corps).

== History ==
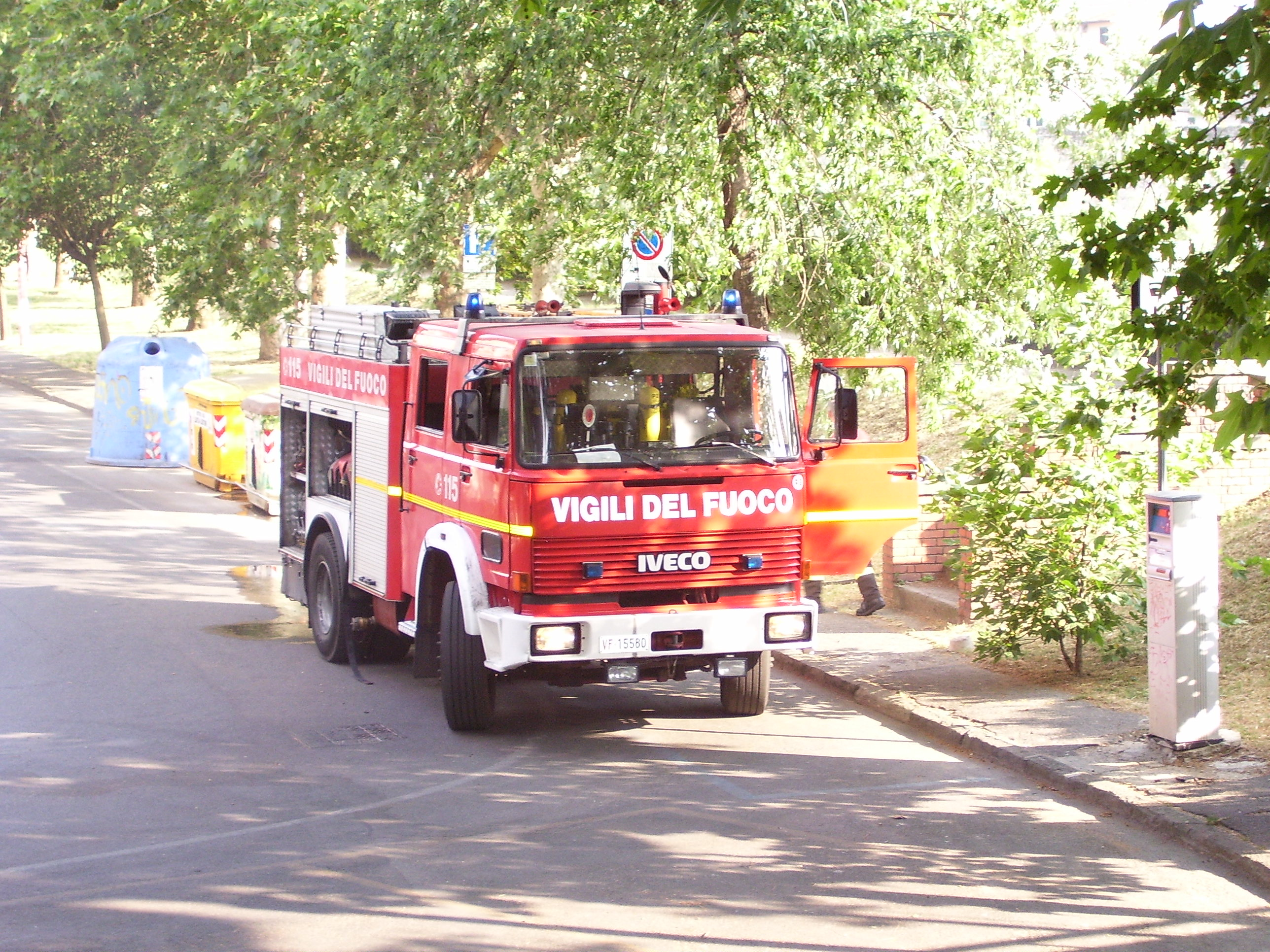
Autopompa Iveco Baribbi 190-26 of the Vigili del Fuoco

The first public firefighting organization in the western world was probably the "Vigiles", a military structured body with fire control and rescue duties that protected the city of Rome in the early centuries A.C. Two stations can be still visited in Rome (The "VII Coorte" and the "Ostia Antica" barracks). Their name has been adopted some 19 century later for the new Italian national firefighters organisation.

During the Calabrian-Sicilian earthquake in 1908, fire brigades from different Italian towns had faced many problems caused by lack of coordination in equipment and operative instructions.

The Fascist government, via the Ministry of the Interior, commissioned the design and creation of a unified fire protection body to Albert Giombini (born in Jesi on 18 July 1898). The Vigili del Fuoco, established in 1941, merged all the fire protection bodies previously existing in various towns and countries. The body played an important role in relieving the civilian population affected by bombing.

In 1942 the "Santa Barbara Battalion" was created after the Italians' retreat from Russia, and the defeat in the Battle of El Alamein. In this phase of the war, the German-Italian Allies planned to invade the island of Malta, then a British possession, using the ladders of the fire brigade, to be mounted on mine-layers. The soldiers (in this plan) could walk the ladders up to the island's territory. Giombini secretly asked all the 94 corps for a list of volunteers; it was necessary a strict selection for the manpower recruiting since the answers were numerous .

The operation, called "C3" by Italians and "Herkules" by Germans, however, was abruptly cancelled in October 1942, and the Battalion was disbanded. In early November, under increasing Anglo-American bombing raids on Italian towns, the men were divided into five groups, each with 100 men, and sent in the cities hardest hit by enemy bombs (Turin, Genoa, Rome, Naples, Milan) to aid the local Fire Commands. The ladders were returned to the Commands and the men who had been part of the Battalion were authorized to wear on the uniform the special badge of the "Santa Barbara".

In 1989 the National Fire Corps was awarded the appointment of "goodwill ambassador" by the Italian Committee for 'UNICEF'. "Yes for Children", a manifesto for children's rights, is one of the campaigns it took part in.

In 2016 the Corp was awarded by the "Conrad Dietrich Magirus Award", the most important international firefighters contest in the world. The Italy's fire department were honoured as "International Firefighting Team of the Year" with this motivation: "Earthquake helpers are distinguished for extraordinary performance and teamwork".

== Organisation ==
Firefighters in Italy are officers of the state. The National Fire and Rescue Service is part of the Department that depends on the Ministry of the Interior. The Department of firefighters, public rescue and civil defense (Dipartimento dei Vigili del Fuoco, del Soccorso Pubblico e della Difesa Civile) is composed by eight central directorates, eighteen regional offices and 103 provincial commands. There are around eight hundred stations throughout the country.

The fire department operates its own nationwide radio network that is fail-safe. From 2021, the fire department's radio network was converted to TETRA digital trunked radio. Digital UHF-Base stations and servers were set up nationwide and in the autonomous regions. A fail-safe nationwide analog radio network was already in operation a few decades ago.

== Operational staff ==
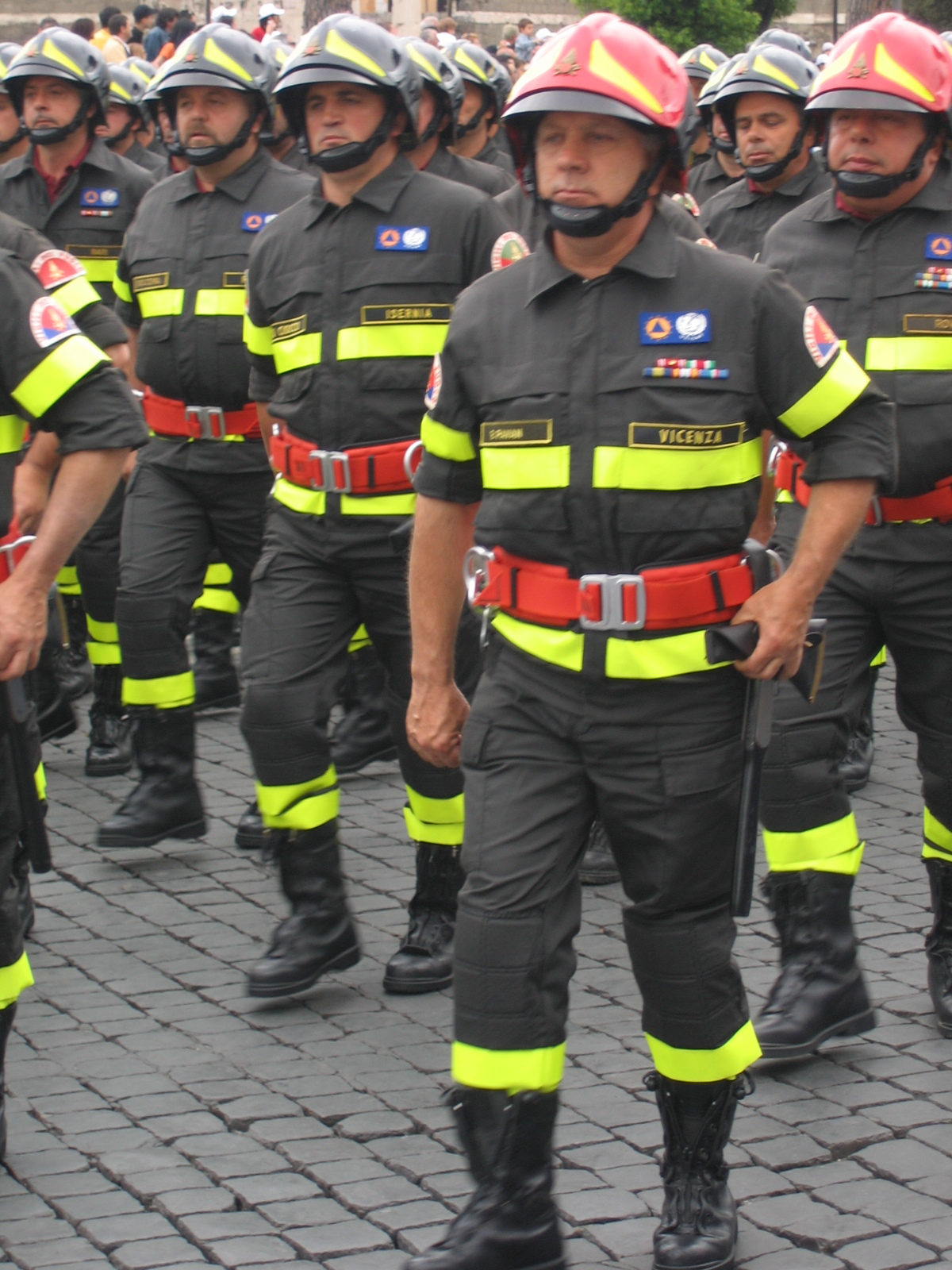
Vigili del fuoco in a parade on 2 June in Rome.

Emergency teams work throughout the country. Detachments of Vigili del Fuoco in each province are controlled by a coordinating command authority. In response to emergency calls, local operations rooms make decisions about the level of response and type of equipment needed and liaise with local police and other emergency services.
Operating personnel may be permanent or volunteer. The latter is distinguished by the presence of a white frieze on the badge of status.

Each team consists of 5 or 6 people and is coordinated by a team leader or by the fireman with the longest field experience. He is distinguished from other firefighters by the red frieze and the red helmet. The rest of the team consists of Vigili Permanenti or of volunteers with several years of "seniority".

Since 5 December 2005 the firefighters are no longer conscripts; citizens can subscribe to the civil service for a year. They are appointed to logistical and clerical services.

The head of the Department of Firefighters, Public Rescue and Public Protection is a prefect, appointed by the Minister of the Interior, who does not belong to the corps; the head of the CNVVF is a general manager from the corps and wears a uniform.

Staff become operational after six months of physical and professional training in Rome. A special course entitles selected firefighters to run emergency vehicles.

Operative staff have functions of criminal police, public safety, and fire prevention. The brigade's main task is to identify the causes of fires in collaboration with other police forces.

"Discontinuous" volunteer fighters are former conscripts who have subscribed to the body, or citizens who have taken a specific course at the local Commands. Discontinuous volunteer brigades serve either at the Provincial Commands and local detachments, or at specific volunteer detachments.

== Support staff ==
The Servizio Amministrativo Tecnico Informatico (Computer Technician Administrative Service), or SATI, supports the operational staff in all administrative and accounting tasks. It employs professionals with skills in computer science, electrical engineering, and telecommunications.

SATI's personnel can be used in support of operational structures in places affected by major disasters or emergencies, where they assist operative staff. Each Command has IT specialists as administrators of the internal networks of the various Provincial, Regional and/or central offices, or as system analysts and programmers to develop the software used by the corps.

== Volunteers ==
In Italy the 60% of the firefighters are volunteers. The volunteers firefighters are organised in local stations (Distaccamento Volontari) under the provincial command. The provincial command is responsible for the recruitment and the training of the volunteers. To become a volunteer you must be 18, Italian citizen and have a good background, and submit the request to the provincial command. The volunteers stations are led by a capo distaccamento volontario nominated by the Ministry of Interior after a public exam, and structured in sections and teams (the team is the smallest unit). Turnations are decided by the capo distaccamento. The volunteers have a pay correspondent tò 8 euros for hour of mission. A different matter is for the firefighting service in the Trentino-Alto Adige Region and Aosta Valley, where the system is independent from the national one and is composed uniquely of volunteers. Only in the autonomous province of Trento there are more than 5000 active volunteers distributed among more than 200 departments

== Specializations ==
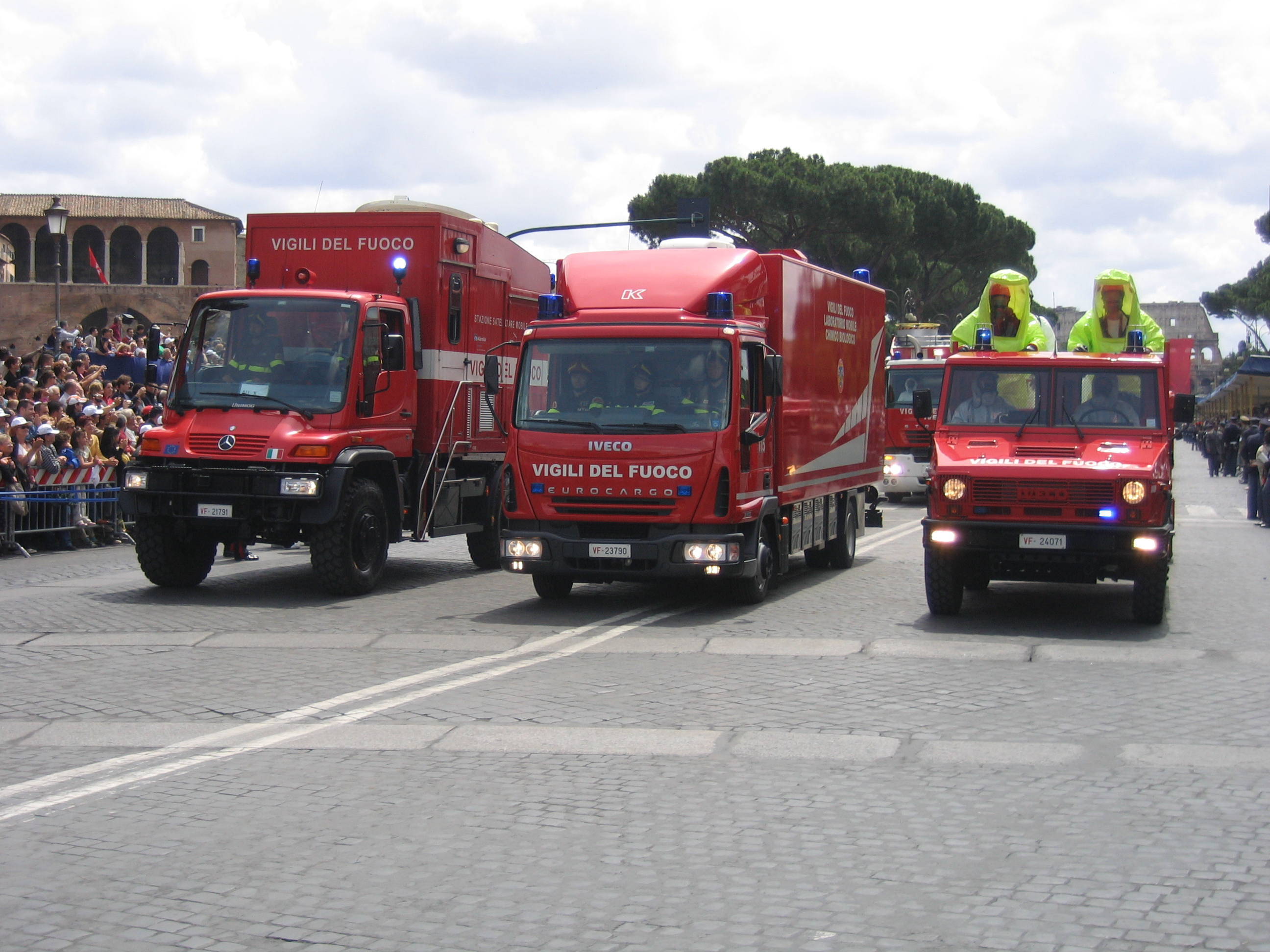
Unimog, Iveco Eurocargo, Iveco VM 90 fire apparatus.

=== NIA ===
Nucleo Investigativo Antincendio (Fire Investigation Unit): it studies, researches and analyzes the causes of fires, often upon specific request by judicial authorities.

=== NSSA ===
Nuclei di Soccorso Subacqueo e Acquatico (Underwater and Water Rescue Units): they have 32 bases on the national territory, and help in risky situations related to water: fire aboard a ship carrying biological, chemical or nuclear weapons; search of persons at sea; flood emergencies. The divers can operate in unconventional places such as aqueducts, wells, sewers and waste water.

=== NH ===
Nucleo Elicotteri (Helicopter units): 12 helicopters grant air support to the groups on the ground for all types of interventions.

=== SAF ===
Speleo-Alpino-Fluviale (cave-alpine river). These rescuers are able to climb rock walls, descend into pits and caves, or tackle the currents of rivers. The same techniques are also used to reach steeples, roofs and top floors of skyscrapers where the normal ladders cannot be used. After earthquakes, they are employed to remove dangerous debris.

=== NCf ===
Nucleo Cinofili (Canine Units): they carry out search and rescue of all kinds, with the help of trained dogs.

=== Airport groups ===
This personnel presides over the safety at domestic airports. They are equipped with heavy duty vehicles equipped with cannons that shoot foam and powder.

=== Harbour groups ===
These units are equipped for rescue operations in sea, for fire on ships and in ports. The staff training is updated to keep pace with new technologies used in the marine field.

=== NBCR ===
Nuclear-Biological-Chemical-Radiological Units: they are prepared to work in the presence of dangerous substances (contamination by nuclear radiation, attacks with unconventional weapons, releases of hazardous substances such as gas or fuel as a result of accidents).

=== Radio repair group ===
They ensure the proper working of the communication system.

=== EMS ===
The group is composed of doctors and Fire Brigade personnel with TPSS (first aid techniques).

== Equipment ==
=== Individual equipment ===
The basic fire-rescue kit of each firefighter consist of: protective helmet, fireproof balaclava, fireproof garments. For large quantities of smoke the fireman wears a breathing aid: a cylinder of compressed air with a facial mask that covers the entire face of the operator. It lasts an average of 20–25 minutes (200 bar), or higher, if at 300 atmospheres.

=== Technical equipment ===
==== Primary vehicles ====
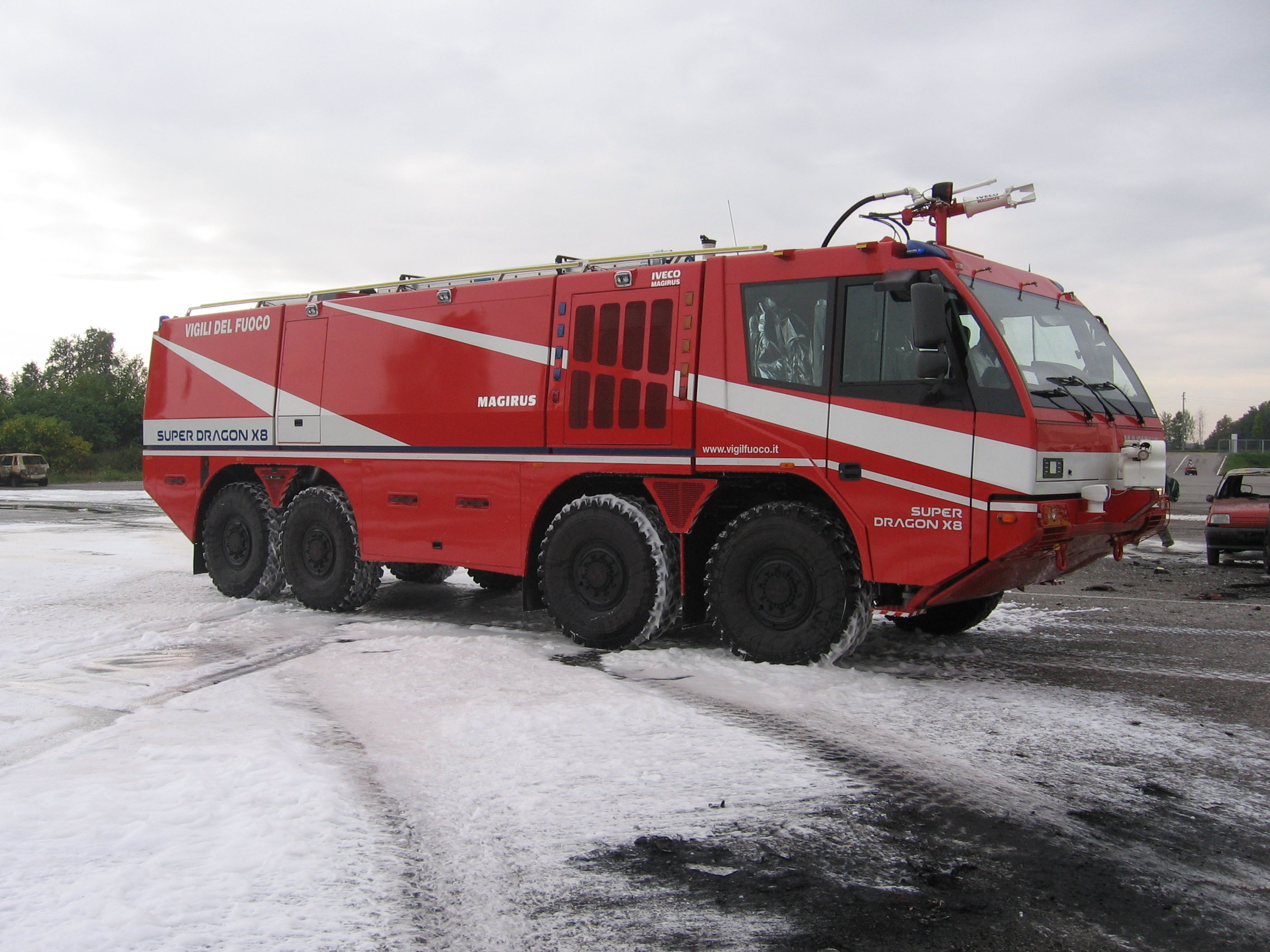
Iveco Magirus Super Dragon X8

- The most common is the APS, which stands for "autopompa serbatoio" (pump tank), used for fires, traffic accidents, etc. These means have specific equipment (hoses, hook ladder, retractor, saw, cutter, etc..) and a fair flow of water.
- The "autoscala" is a ladder vehicle used to reach high floors, trees, etc. It can reach heights of 20 mt up to 50 mt in larger vehicles.
- L'"autobotte pompa" (ABP) (pump) allows a big flow of water (about 8000lt.).

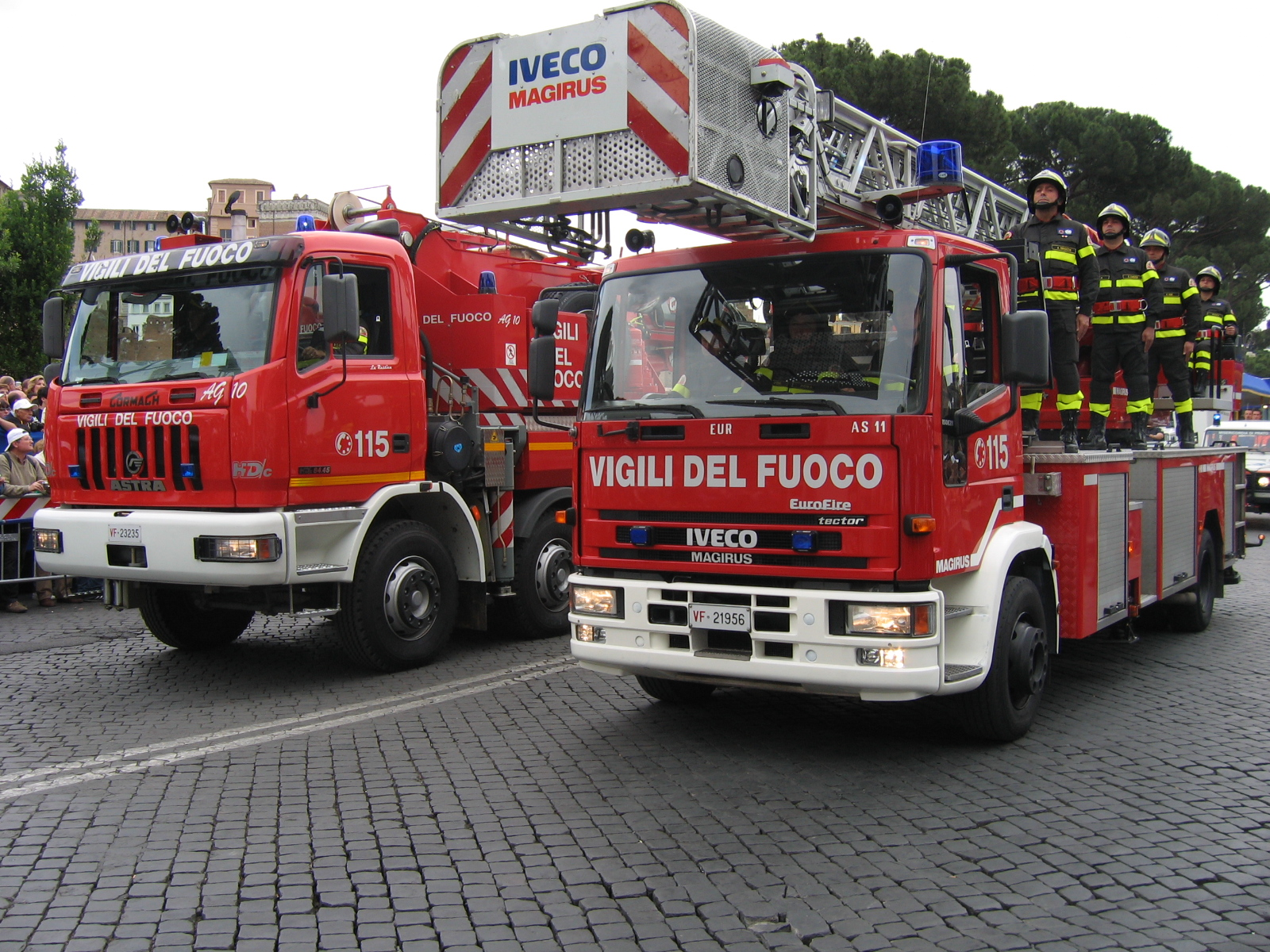
Italian Fire Service vehicles with an Astra crane on the left and a Magirus turntable ladder on the right, Army Parade in Rome, 2 June 2006.

==== Nautical and port rescue ====
MBPs (pump motorboats) differ in speed, length, water flow: faster boats have a lower water flow, and vice versa. Speed varies from 12 to 50 knots.

Locations of the "Nuclei Portuali" (Harbour groups):

- Class I (ports of international importance): Ancona, Augusta, Cagliari, Genoa, Gioia Tauro, La Spezia, Livorno, Naples, Ravenna, Savona, Taranto, Trieste, Venice.
- Class II (ports of national importance): Bari, Brindisi, Catania, Civitavecchia, Messina, Palermo, Porto Torres;
- Class III (ports of regional and interregional importance): Gaeta, Trapani, Vibo Valentia.

==== Aviation ====
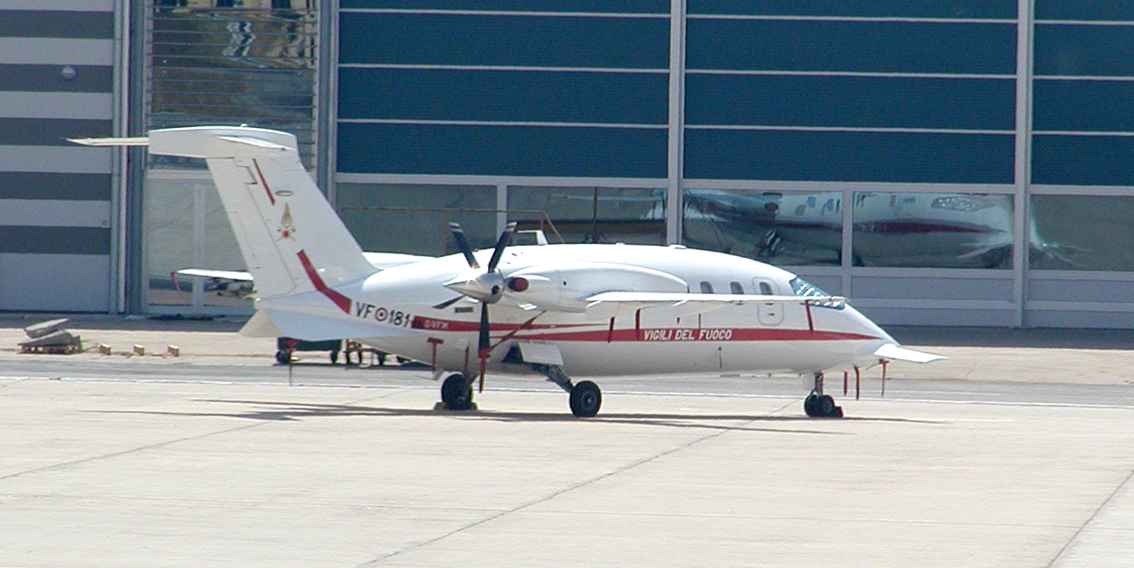
Piaggio P-180 of the Vigili del Fuoco

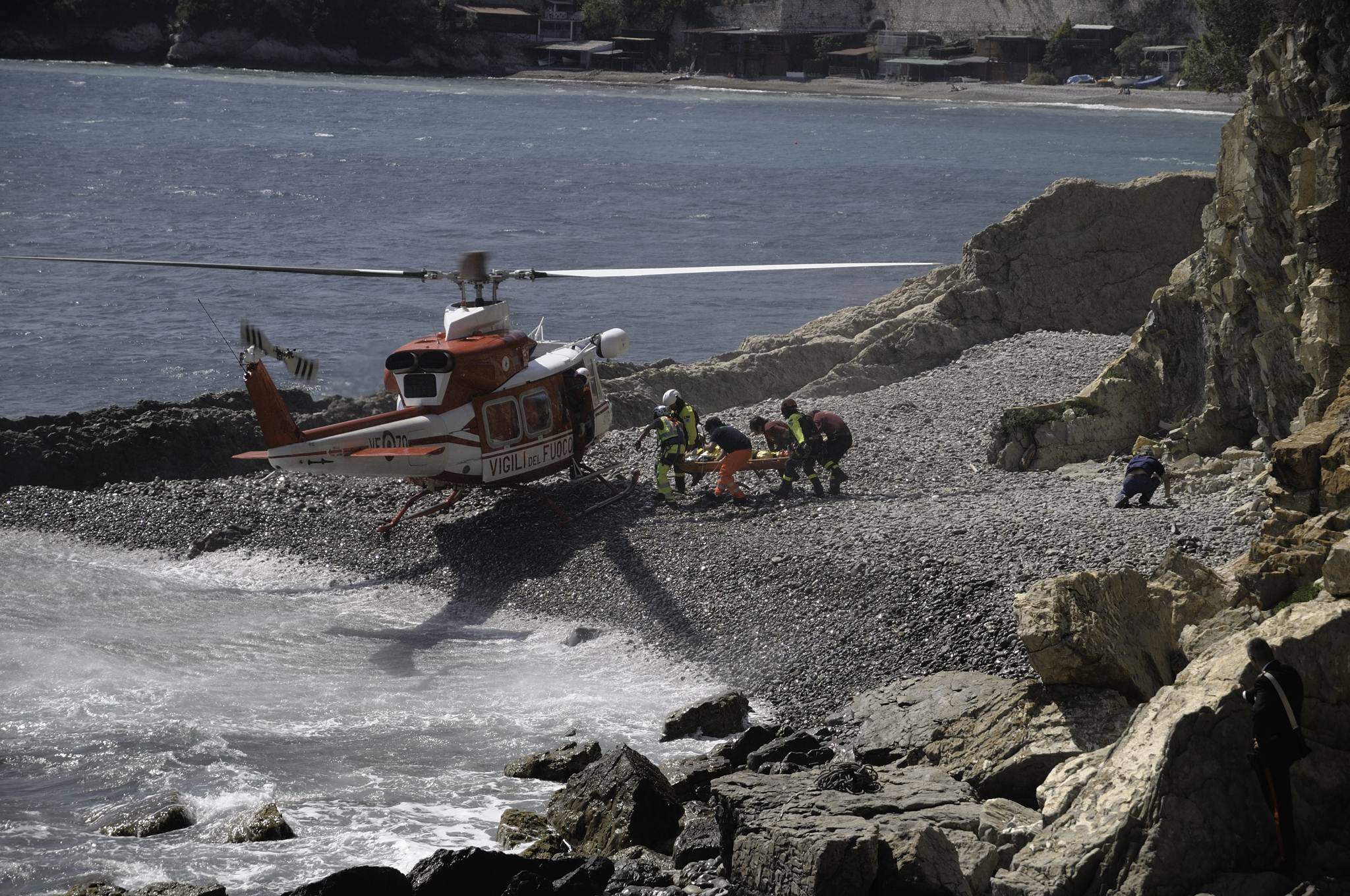
Vigili del Fuoco helicopter

Twelve helicopter units are located at Alghero, Arezzo, Bari, Bologna, Catania, Genoa, Pescara, Salerno, Turin, Varese, Venice and at the Aviation Center of Rome Ciampino.

The helicopters now in use are:

- Agusta-Bell AB 412, used for transportation, rescue, fire extinguishing, etc.
- Agusta-Bell AB 206, used for reconnaissance services (monitoring and control).
- AgustaWestland AW109, gradually replacing the older AB 206.
- AgustaWestland AW139, gradually replacing the older AB 412.

Two twin-engine turboprop airplanes, Piaggio P180 Avanti II are located at Rome Ciampino.

=== Other equipment ===
The craft have visual signaling devices (flashing blue lights) and siren (electromechanic wail, also known as whistle or Hi-Lo).

== Band ==
The Fire Service band was formed in the late 1930s, it consists of more than 60 members from various Provincial Commands of Italy. They perform at both official and unofficial ceremonies: parades, festivals, concerts, etc. All the performers have a diploma from a national Music School and are employed in regular service.

== Rank system ==
The current rank system dates from 2007, while the matching military styled insignia are from 2012.

Rank	English	Epaulette	Chest badge for operational uniform	Wrist badge	Fregio for cap	NATO Code equivalent
Managers
Dirigente generale Capo del Corpo	Chief general manager of the corps					OF-8
Dirigente generale	General manager					OF-7
Dirigente superiore di livello C	Superior manager C-level					OF-6
Dirigente superiore di livello D dirigente superiore medico dirigente superiore ginnico-sportivo	Superior manager D-level; Medical superior manager Gymnastic-sport superior manager					OF-6
Primo dirigente di livello E	First manager E-Level					OF-5
Primo dirigente di livello F Primo dirigente medico Primo dirigente ginnico-sportivo	First manager F-Level; Medical first manager Gymnastic-sport first manager					OF-5
Directors
Direttore vice dirigente con funzioni del dirigente di livello E	Director vice-manager with functions of the E-level manager					OF-4
Direttore vice dirigente Direttore medico vice dirigente Direttore ginnico-sportivo vice dirigente	Director vice-manager Medical director vice-manager Gymnastic-sport director vice-manager					OF-4
Direttore; Direttore medico Direttore ginnico-sportivo	Director; Medical director Gymnastic-sport director					OF-3
Vice direttore Vice direttore medico Vice direttore ginnico-sportivo	Vice director Medical vice director Gymnastic-sport vice director					OF-1
Inspectors and deputy fire directors
Sostituto direttore antincendi capo esperto	Deputy director fire chief expert					OR-9
Sostituto direttore antincendi capo	Deputy director fire chief					OR-9
Sostituto direttore antincendi	Deputy fire director					OR-9
Ispettore antincendi esperto	Fire inspector expert					OR-9
Ispettore antincendi	Fire inspector					OR-8
Vice ispettore antincendi	Vice fire inspector					OR-8
Team and Department Heads
Caporeparto esperto	Department head expert (Note: Rank no longer awarded since 2018)					OR-7
Caporeparto	Department head					OR-7
Caposquadra esperto	Foreman expert					OR-6
Caposquadra	Foreman					OR-5
Firefighters
Vigile del fuoco coordinatore	Firefighter coordinator					OR-4
Vigile del fuoco esperto	Firefighter expert					OR-4
Vigile del fuoco qualificato	Qualified firefighter (Note: Rank no longer awarded since 2018)					OR-4
Vigile del fuoco	Firefighter					OR-4
Volunteers
Tecnico antincendi volontario	Voluntary fire technician					
Caporeparto volontario	Voluntary department head					
Caposquadra volontario	Voluntary foreman					
Vigile del fuoco volontario	Voluntary firefighter					

== Museums ==
- Villa Bellavista (Borgo a Buggiano)
- Carate Brianza
- Chiavenna
- Milan

== See also ==
- Vigiles, the firefighters and police of Ancient Rome.
- Corps of Firefighters of the Vatican City State
- Gruppo Sportivo Fiamme Rosse
