= Mary Jones (rower) =

American rower (born 1986)

Personal information
- Born: August 25, 1986 (age 39) Huntsville, Alabama, United States

Sport
- Country: United States
- Sport: Rowing
Medal record
Representing the United States
Pan American Games
Gold medal – first place	2015 Toronto	LW1x
World Rowing Championships
Silver medal – second place	2018 Plovdiv	LW2x
Silver medal – second place	2023 Belgrade	LW2x
Bronze medal – third place	2017 Sarasota	LW1x

Mary Jones (born August 25, 1986) is an American rower. She competed in the women's lightweight single sculls events at the 2015 Pan American Games and the 2016 and 2017 World Rowing Championships, and the women's lightweight double sculls at the 2018 World Rowing Championships.
