= Marie-Louise Dräger =

German rower

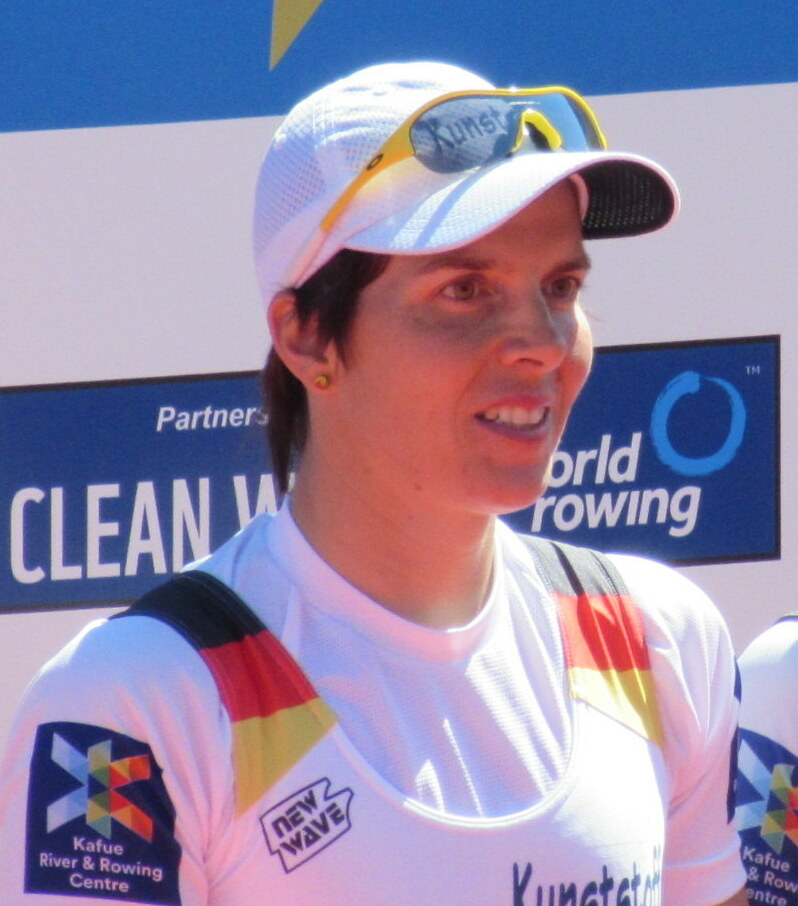
- Marie-Louise Dräger in 2016

Personal information
- Nationality: German
- Born: 11 April 1981 (age 45) Lübeck, West Germany
- Height: 1.70 m (5 ft 7 in)
- Weight: 59 kg (130 lb)

Sport
- Country: Germany
- Sport: Rowing
- Event(s): Lightweight single sculls, Lightweight double sculls
- Club: Rostock ORC
Medal record
Women's rowing
Representing Germany
World Championships
Gold medal – first place	2003 Milan	Lwt double sculls
Gold medal – first place	2005 Kaizu	Lwt double sculls
Gold medal – first place	2010 Karapiro	Lwt single sculls
Gold medal – first place	2010 Karapiro	Lwt quad sculls
Gold medal – first place	2019 Ottensheim	Lwt single sculls
Bronze medal – third place	2007 Munich	Lwt double sculls
European Championships
Gold medal – first place	2010 Montemor-o-Velho	Lwt single sculls
Silver medal – second place	2015 Poznań	Lwt double sculls
Silver medal – second place	2016 Brandenburg	Lwt double sculls

Marie-Louise Dräger (born 11 April 1981) is a German national representative rower who has represented over a twenty-year period from 1999 to 2019. She is a five-time world champion lightweight sculler who has won world championships titles in all sculling boat classes. She is a three-time Olympian who competed for Germany in both the lightweight double sculls and the women's single sculls at the Olympics.
