= Madeleine Arlett =

British rower (born 1994)

Personal information
- Full name: Madeleine Fiona Arlett
- Nickname: Maddie
- Nationality: British
- Born: 7 June 1994 (age 32)
- Home town: Selkirk, Scotland
- Education: Edinburgh University
- Height: 172 cm (5 ft 8 in)
- Weight: 58 kg (128 lb)

Sport
- Country: Great Britain
- Sport: Rowing
- Event: Lightweight single sculls
- Club: Edinburgh University Boat Club
Medal record
World Championships
| Bronze medal – third place | 2019 Ottensheim | Lwt single sculls |

Madeleine Fiona Arlett (born 7 June 1994) is a British rower. She won the British Championship U23 lightweight single scull three years in a row.

Arlett was named Senior rower of the year in November 2015 at the annual Scottish Rowing Awards.

In 2019, Arlett won a bronze medal at the World Rowing Championships in Ottensheim, Austria in the lightweight single sculls.
