= Georgia Nesbitt =

Australian rower (born 1992)

Personal information
- Born: 8 May 1992 (age 34)
- Years active: 2004–2022

Sport
- Country: Australia
- Sport: Rowing
- Club: Huon Rowing Club

Achievements and titles
- National finals: Victoria Cup 2011-19,22
Medal record
Women's rowing
Representing Australia
World Rowing Championships
Silver medal – second place	2017 Sarasota	LW4X
World Rowing U23 Championships
Bronze medal – third place	2014 Varese	BLW2X

Georgia Nesbitt (born 8 May 1992, in Tasmania) is an Australian former representative lightweight rower who made 10 representative appearances for Australia between 2013 and 2022. She was a seven-time national champion (winning three titles at the 2019 Australian Championships) and she won a silver medal at the 2017 World Rowing Championships. In 2022, prior to a serious cycling accident, she competed in Australian Road National championships and had qualified to participate in her age group at the 2023 Ironman World Championships in Helsinki.

== Club and state rowing ==
Nesbitt's senior rowing has been from the Huon Rowing Club in southern Tasmania.

Nesbitt first made state selection for Tasmania in 2011 in the women's lightweight quad scull contesting the Victoria Cup at the Interstate Regatta within the Australian Rowing Championships. She made five consecutive Victoria Cup appearances for Tasmania from 2011 to 2015, was in victorious Tasmanian quads in 2014 and 2015 and she stroked the 2014 crew. Tasmania did not enter a Victoria Cup quad in 2017 but in 2018 Nesbitt was back in the stroke seat for their third placing at the Interstate Regatta. In 2022, she again stroked the Tasmania women's lightweight quad to a Victoria Cup victory.

At the Australian Championships in 2015 she won the national lightweight single sculls title. At the 2019 Australian Championships she won three national titles - the women's lightweight single scull, the lightweight double scull (with her Huon clubmate Eve Mure) and she stroked the Tasmanian lightweight women's quad to victory for the Interstate Championship. In 2021 she again stroked the Tasmanian women's lightweight quad to a Victoria Cup victory and also won an Australian Championship title in the open lightweight women's single scull.

== International representative rowing ==
Nesbitt made her Australian representative debut in 2013 in an U23 lightweight double scull. She rowed with Georgia Miansarow to a fifth place at the World Rowing U23 Championships in Linz. That same year with Miansarow, Hannah Clarke and Alex Hayes she was selected in the Australian senior lightweight quad scull which raced at 2013 World Rowing Championships in Chungju to fifth place.

In 2014, still paired with Miansarow she raced in the lightweight double scull at the World Rowing Cup III in Lucerne to fifth place. Then at the 2014 World Rowing U23 Championships in Varese the two Georgias rowed the double to a bronze medal.

In 2015, she competed at the World Championships in Aiguebelette in a single scull where she finished in eight place.

Nesbitt was back in Australian representative contention in 2017. She rowed in the lightweight double at the World Rowing Cup II in Poznan to sixth place and then at the WRC III in Lucerne with Amy James, Alice Arch and Miansarow they raced in both the lightweight and the heavyweight quad events, winning the lightweight. They were in ready form for the 2017 World Rowing Championships in Sarasota where they rowed to a second placing and a silver medal.

That crew stayed together into 2018. They raced as two doubles at the WRC II in Linz where the Georgias finished 14th and then at the WRC III in Lucerne with Arch changed out for Sarah Pound, they placed fifth. In 2019, Nesbitt was again selected in Australia's lightweight sculling squad for the 2019 international season. She rowed to success in the single scull at the two World Rowing Cups in Europe, winning a bronze medal at the World Rowing Cup II in Poznan and then silver at WRC III in Rotterdam. Nesbitt was then selected to race Australia's lightweight double scull with Sarah Pound at the 2019 World Rowing Championships in Linz, Austria. The double were looking for a top seven finish at the 2019 World Championships to qualify for the Tokyo Olympics. They placed third in the B-final for an overall ninth-place finish and failed to qualify the boat for Tokyo 2020. Before those delayed Tokyo Olympics at the final Olympic qualification regatta in Lucerne, Switzerland in May 2021 and again paired with Pound, she raced an Australian representative lightweight double, again attempting to qualify that boat. They made their final, finished in 6th place and missed the Olympic cut-off.

In March 2022, Nesbitt was selected in the Australian training team to prepare for the 2022 international season and the 2022 World Rowing Championships. She rowed the lightweight women's single scull at both of the World Rowing Cups in June and July 2022, winning a silver medal at WRC III. At the 2022 World Rowing Championships at Racize, Nesbitt represented as Australia's lightweight women's single sculler, made the C final and finished the regatta in overall seventeenth place.

== Cycling/Ironwoman ==
After leaving the Australian national rowing squad in December 2022, Nesbitt focussed on cycling and ironwoman events. She competed in cycling Road National Championships in 2023 and was in training for the 2023 Oceania Road Cycling Championships when she suffered a serious cycling accident during a criterium race in Tolosa Park Hobart. She required surgery for a broken jaw and extensive rehabilitation for a serious brain injury.

== Professional ==
A qualified solicitor who practises in Hobart, in 2023 Nesbitt was appointed to the board of Rowing Tasmania.
