= Emma Fredh =

Swedish rower

Medal record

Women's rowing

Representing Sweden

World Championships
Silver medal – second place	2016 Rotterdam	Lwt single sculls

European Championships
Gold medal – first place	2017 Račice	Lwt single sculls
Silver medal – second place	2015 Poznań	Lwt single sculls

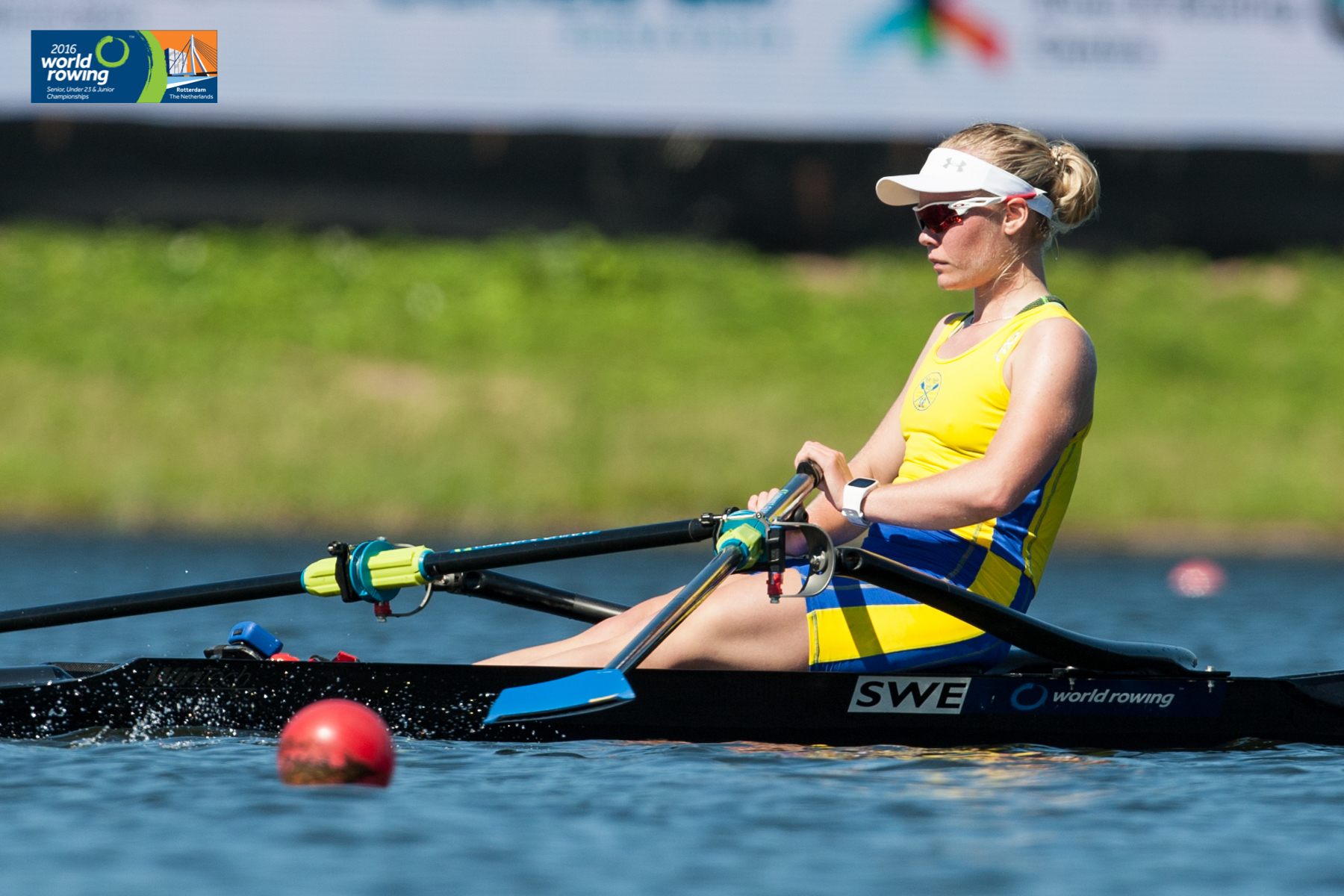
Emma Fredh

Emma Fredh (born 14 April 1990 in Borås) is a Swedish rower. She won the silver medal in the lightweight women's single sculls at the 2016 World Rowing Championships.
