= Alice Arch =

Australian rower (born 1994)

Personal information
- Born: 5 January 1994 (age 32)
- Home town: Melbourne, Victoria, Australia
- Education: Wesley College; Melbourne University
- Height: 171 cm (5 ft 7 in)
- Weight: 58 kg (128 lb)

Sport
- Country: Australia
- Sport: Rowing
- Club: Melbourne University Boat Club
- Coached by: John Keogh, Tom Westgarth, Ellen Randell
Medal record
Women's rowing
Representing Australia
World Championships
Silver medal – second place	2017 Sarasota	LW4X

Alice Arch (born 5 January 1994) is an Australian former representative lightweight rower. She was a national champion and won a silver medal at the 2017 World Rowing Championships.

== Club and state rowing ==
Arch was educated at Wesley College, Melbourne where she took up rowing. Her senior club rowing has been from the Melbourne University Boat Club.

Arch first made state selection for Victoria in 2015 in the women's lightweight quad scull contesting the Victoria Cup at the Interstate Regatta within the Australian Rowing Championships. She made four consecutive Victoria Cup appearances for Victoria from 2015 to 2018 and was in the winning Victorian quad of 2016.

At the Australian Championships in 2015 in MUBC colours she contested all three national U23 lightweight sculling titles and placed second in the double and the quad. In 2016 she won the national U23 quad scull title.

== International representative rowing ==
Arch made her Australian representative debut in 2016 in an U23 lightweight double scull. She rowed with India McKenzie to a fifth place at the World Rowing U23 Championships in Rotterdam.

In 2017 Arch stepped up to the Australian senior squad . She rowed in a lightweight double at the World Rowing Cup II in Poznan to sixth place with Georgia Miansarow and then at the WRC III in Lucerne with Miansarow, Georgia Nesbitt and Amy James they raced in both the lightweight and the heavyweight quad events, winning the lightweight. They were in ready form for the 2017 World Rowing Championships in Sarasota where they rowed to a second placing and a silver medal.

That crew stayed together into 2018. They raced as two doubles at the WRC II in Linz where Arch and James finished 11th. Then at the WRC III in Lucerne Arch was changed out of the quad for Sarah Pound. Arch rowed Australia's lightweight single scull and took a silver medal. She was selected to race Australia's lightweight single scull at the 2018 World Rowing Championships in Plodiv. She placed second in her heat, progressing to the semi-final and the B-final, finishing in overall tenth place.

In 2019 Arch was selected with Sarah Pound to row Australia's lightweight double scull for the 2019 international season. They placed 14th at the World Rowing Cup II in Poznan and 8th at WRC III in Rotterdam. Arch was then selected to race Australia's lightweight single scull at the 2019 World Rowing Championships in Linz, Austria. She progressed through three preliminary races and won the B final for an overall world seventh place.

== Business career ==
Arch graduated from Melbourne University with a Bachelor of Science. In 2020 she was a consultant with the Australian operation of the international management consultancy Nous. In 2020 she served a term on the Athletes Commission of Rowing Australia.
