= Rowing at the 2012 Summer Olympics – Women's lightweight double sculls =

Women's lightweight double sculls at the Games of the XXX Olympiad
- Venue: Eton Dorney
- Date: 29 July – 4 August 2012
- Competitors: 34 from 17 nations
- Winning time: 7:09.30

Medalists
| 1st place, gold medalist(s) | | Katherine Copeland; Sophie Hosking | Great Britain |
| 2nd place, silver medalist(s) | | Xu Dongxiang; Wenyi Huang | China |
| 3rd place, bronze medalist(s) | | Christina Giazitzidou; Alexandra Tsiavou | Greece |

The Women's lightweight double sculls competition at the 2012 Summer Olympics in London took place are at Dorney Lake which, for the purposes of the Games venue, is officially termed Eton Dorney.

== Schedule ==
All times are British Summer Time (UTC+1)

| Date | Time | Round |
|---|---|---|
| Sunday, 29 July 2012 | 10:40 | Heats |
| Tuesday, 31 July 2012 | 10:10 | Repechages |
| Thursday, 2 August 2012 | 10:30 | Semifinals |
| Saturday, 4 August 2012 | 10:00 | Final C |
| Saturday, 4 August 2012 | 10:40 | Final B |
| Saturday, 4 August 2012 | 11:50 | Final |

== Results ==
=== Heats ===
First two of each heat qualify to the semifinals, remainder goes to the repechage.

==== Heat 1 ====
| Rank | Rowers | Country | Time | Notes |
|---|---|---|---|---|
| 1 | Sophie Hosking; Katherine Copeland | Great Britain | 6:56.96 | Q |
| 2 | Anne Lolk Thomsen; Juliane Rasmussen | Denmark | 6:59.94 | Q |
| 3 | Louise Ayling; Julia Edward | New Zealand | 7:02.78 | R |
| 4 | Yaima Velázquez; Yoslaine Domínguez | Cuba | 7:12.99 | R |
| 5 | María Clara Rohner; Milka Kraljev | Argentina | 7:33.37 | R |
| 6 | Sara Mohamed Baraka; Fatma Rashed | Egypt | 7:45.23 | R |

==== Heat 2 ====
| Rank | Rowers | Country | Time | Notes |
|---|---|---|---|---|
| 1 | Christina Giazitzidou; Alexandra Tsiavou | Greece | 7:03.66 | Q |
| 2 | Bronwen Watson; Hannah Every-Hall | Australia | 7:05.30 | Q |
| 3 | Kristin Hedstrom; Julie Nichols | United States | 7:08.46 | R |
| 4 | Rianne Sigmond; Maaike Head | Netherlands | 7:10.49 | R |
| 5 | Lindsay Jennerich; Patricia Obee | Canada | 7:10.89 | R |
| 6 | Luana de Assis; Fabiana Beltrame | Brazil | 7:34.37 | R |

==== Heat 3 ====
| Rank | Rowers | Country | Time | Notes |
|---|---|---|---|---|
| 1 | Xu Dongxiang; Huang Wenyi | China | 7:15.57 | Q |
| 2 | Lena Müller; Anja Noske | Germany | 7:19.24 | Q |
| 3 | Atsumi Fukumoto; Akiko Iwamoto | Japan | 7:30.29 | R |
| 4 | Kim Myeong-sin; Kim Sol-ji | South Korea | 7:31.98 | R |
| 5 | Pham Thi Hai; Pham Thi Thao | Vietnam | 7:40.06 | R |

=== Repechage ===
First three qualify to the semifinal.

==== Repechage 1 ====
| Rank | Rower | Country | Time | Notes |
|---|---|---|---|---|
| 1 | Rianne Sigmond; Maaike Head | Netherlands | 7:19.26 | Q |
| 2 | Louise Ayling; Julia Edward | New Zealand | 7:19.26 | Q |
| 3 | Atsumi Fukumoto; Akiko Iwamoto | Japan | 7:23.79 | Q |
| 4 | Luana de Assis; Fabiana Beltrame | Brazil | 7:27.46 | |
| 5 | Pham Thi Hai; Pham Thi Thao | Vietnam | 7:37.64 | |
| 6 | Sara Mohamed Baraka; Fatma Rashed | Egypt | 7:54.01 | |

==== Repechage 2 ====
| Rank | Rower | Country | Time | Notes |
|---|---|---|---|---|
| 1 | Kristin Hedstrom; Julie Nichols | United States | 7:13.82 | Q |
| 2 | Lindsay Jennerich; Patricia Obee | Canada | 7:15.37 | Q |
| 3 | Yaima Velázquez; Yoslaine Dominguez | Cuba | 7:19.33 | Q |
| 4 | Kim Myung-shin; Kim Sol-ji | South Korea | 7:27.95 | |
| 5 | Maria Rohner; Milka Kraljev | Argentina | 7:40.72 | |

=== Semifinals A/B ===
==== Semifinal 1 ====
| Rank | Rowers | Country | Time | Notes |
|---|---|---|---|---|
| 1 | Katherine Copeland; Sophie Hosking | Great Britain | 7:05.90 | Q |
| 2 | Christina Giazitzidou; Alexandra Tsiavou | Greece | 7:09.01 | Q |
| 3 | Lena Müller; Anja Noske | Germany | 7:10.16 | Q |
| 4 | Kristin Hedstrom; Julie Nichols | United States | 7:12.61 | |
| 5 | Louise Ayling; Julia Edward | New Zealand | 7:15.06 | |
| 6 | Yaima Velasquez; Yoslaine Dominguez | Cuba | 7:21.86 | |

==== Semifinal 2 ====
| Rank | Rowers | Country | Time | Notes |
|---|---|---|---|---|
| 1 | Xu Dongxiang; Wenyi Huang | China | 7:10.39 | Q |
| 2 | Anne Lolk Thomsen; Juliane Rasmussen | Denmark | 7:10.93 | Q |
| 3 | Bronwen Watson; Hannah Every-Hall | Australia | 7:12.35 | Q |
| 4 | Lindsay Jennerich; Patricia Obee | Canada | 7:14.83 | |
| 5 | Rianne Sigmond; Maaike Head | Netherlands | 7:19.31 | |
| 6 | Atsumi Fukumoto; Akiko Iwamoto | Japan | 7:34.23 | |

=== Finals ===
==== Final C ====
| Rank | Rowers | Country | Time | Notes |
|---|---|---|---|---|
| 1 | Luana de Assis; Fabiana Beltrame | Brazil | 7:41.43 | |
| 2 | Kim Myung-shin; Kim Sol-ji | South Korea | 7:44.03 | |
| 3 | Maria Rohner; Milka Kraljev | Argentina | 7:44.62 | |
| 4 | Pham Thi Hai; Pham Thi Thao | Vietnam | 7:51.82 | |
| 5 | Sara Mohamed Baraka; Fatma Rashed | Egypt | 8:14.17 | |

==== Final B ====
| Rank | Rowers | Country | Time | Notes |
|---|---|---|---|---|
| 1 | Lindsay Jennerich; Patricia Obee | Canada | 7:17.24 | |
| 2 | Rianne Sigmond; Maaike Head | Netherlands | 7:20.36 | |
| 3 | Louise Ayling; Julia Edward | New Zealand | 7:22.78 | |
| 4 | Yaima Velasquez; Yoslaine Dominguez | Cuba | 7:23.25 | |
| 5 | Kristin Hedstrom; Julie Nichols | United States | 7:23.31 | |
| 6 | Atsumi Fukumoto; Akiko Iwamoto | Japan | 7:32.12 | |

==== Final A ====
| Rank | Rowers | Country | Time | Notes |
|---|---|---|---|---|
| 1st place, gold medalist(s) | Katherine Copeland; Sophie Hosking | Great Britain | 7:09.30 | |
| 2nd place, silver medalist(s) | Xu Dongxiang; Huang Wenyi | China | 7:11.93 | |
| 3rd place, bronze medalist(s) | Christina Giazitzidou; Alexandra Tsiavou | Greece | 7:12.09 | |
| 4 | Anne Lolk Thomsen; Juliane Rasmussen | Denmark | 7:15.53 | |
| 5 | Bronwen Watson; Hannah Every-Hall | Australia | 7:20.68 | |
| 6 | Lena Müller; Anja Noske | Germany | 7:22.18 | |
