= Rowing at the 2010 Asian Games – Women's lightweight double sculls =

Women's lightweight double sculls at the 2010 Asian Games
- Venue: Guangzhou International Rowing Centre
- Date: 14–18 November 2010
- Competitors: 14 from 7 nations

Medalists
gold medal	Huang Wenyi; Pan Feihong	China
silver medal	Akiko Iwamoto; Atsumi Fukumoto	Japan
bronze medal	Kim Myung-shin; Kim Sol-ji	South Korea

The women's lightweight double sculls competition at the 2010 Asian Games in Guangzhou, China was held from 14 November to 18 November at the International Rowing Centre.

== Schedule ==
All times are China Standard Time (UTC+08:00)

Date	Time	Event
Sunday, 14 November 2010	10:20	Heats
Tuesday, 16 November 2010	10:00	Repechage
Thursday, 18 November 2010	10:25	Final

== Results ==
Legend

- DNS — Did not start

=== Heats ===
- Qualification: 1 → Final (FA), 2–4 → Repechage (R)

==== Heat 1 ====
Rank	Team	Time	Notes
1	Uzbekistan (UZB); Nataliya Bogitova; Zarrina Mihaylova	7:19.88	FA
2	South Korea (KOR); Kim Myung-shin; Kim Sol-ji	7:23.28	R
3	Vietnam (VIE); Phạm Thị Hài; Đặng Thị Thắm	7:31.16	R
4	North Korea (PRK); Ri Sol-gyong; Kim Un-sil	7:32.19	R

==== Heat 2 ====
Rank	Team	Time	Notes
1	China (CHN); Huang Wenyi; Pan Feihong	7:10.25	FA
2	Japan (JPN); Akiko Iwamoto; Atsumi Fukumoto	7:19.09	R
3	Iran (IRI); Fatemeh Khalaj Hedayati; Nazanin Malaei	7:27.14	R

=== Repechage ===
- Qualification: 1–4 → Final (FA)

Rank	Team	Time	Notes
1	Japan (JPN); Akiko Iwamoto; Atsumi Fukumoto	7:14.59	FA
2	South Korea (KOR); Kim Myung-shin; Kim Sol-ji	7:18.56	FA
3	Iran (IRI); Fatemeh Khalaj Hedayati; Nazanin Malaei	7:19.93	FA
4	Vietnam (VIE); Phạm Thị Hài; Đặng Thị Thắm	8:09.66	FA
—	North Korea (PRK); Ri Sol-gyong; Kim Un-sil	DNS	

=== Final ===
Rank	Team	Time
1st place, gold medalist(s)	China (CHN); Huang Wenyi; Pan Feihong	7:13.02
2nd place, silver medalist(s)	Japan (JPN); Akiko Iwamoto; Atsumi Fukumoto	7:18.13
3rd place, bronze medalist(s)	South Korea (KOR); Kim Myung-shin; Kim Sol-ji	7:22.51
4	Uzbekistan (UZB); Nataliya Bogitova; Zarrina Mihaylova	7:26.73
5	Iran (IRI); Fatemeh Khalaj Hedayati; Nazanin Malaei	7:30.15
6	Vietnam (VIE); Phạm Thị Hài; Đặng Thị Thắm	8:11.67
