= Rowing at the 2015 Pan American Games – Women's lightweight double sculls =

Rowing – Women's lightweight double sculls at the 2015 Pan American Games
- Venue: Royal Canadian Henley Rowing Course
- Dates: July 11 - July 14
- Competitors: 16 from 8 nations
- Winning time Final A: 6:57.23

Medalists
Gold medal	Liz Fenje; Katherine Sauks	Canada
Silver medal	Yislena Hernandez; Licet Hernandez	Cuba
Bronze medal	Sara Giancola; Victoria Burke	United States

The women's lightweight double sculls rowing event at the 2015 Pan American Games was held from July 11–14 at the Royal Canadian Henley Rowing Course in St. Catharines.

== Schedule ==
All times are Eastern Standard Time (UTC-3).

Date	Time	Round
July 11, 2015	10:15	Heat 1
July 11, 2015	10:25	Heat 2
July 11, 2015	14:35	Repechage
July 14, 2015	9:15	Final B
July 14, 2015	9:45	Final A

== Results ==
=== Heats ===
==== Heat 1 ====
Rank	Rowers	Country	Time	Notes
1	Yislena Hernandez; Licet Hernandez	Cuba	7:33.70	FA
2	Fabiola Nunez; Itzama Medina	Mexico	7:53.54	R
3	Adriana Escobar; Karla Calvo	El Salvador	7:57.81	R
4	Keyla Garcia Marcucci; Jenesis Perez Pastran	Venezuela	8:06.66	R

==== Heat 2 ====
Rank	Rowers	Country	Time	Notes
1	Liz Fenje; Katherine Sauks	Canada	7:21.43	FA
2	Sarah Giancola; Victoria Burke	United States	7:28.79	R
3	Milka Kraljev; Maria Rohner	Argentina	7:31.50	R
4	Caroline De Caevalho Corado; Sophia Valente Camara Py	Brazil	7:47.41	R

=== Repechage ===
Rank	Rowers	Country	Time	Notes
1	Milka Kraljev; Maria Rohner	Argentina	7:37.11	FA
2	Sarah Giancola; Victoria Burke	United States	7:39.88	FA
3	Fabiola Nunez; Itzama Medina	Mexico	7:43.56	FA
4	Caroline De Caevalho Corado; Sophia Valente Camara Py	Brazil	7:46.68	FA
5	Adriana Escobar; Karla Calvo	El Salvador	8:00.97	FB
6	Keyla Garcia Marcucci; Jenesis Perez Pastran	Venezuela	8:12.14	FB

=== Finals ===
==== Final B ====
Rank	Rowers	Country	Time	Notes
7	Keyla Garcia Marcucci; Jenesis Perez Pastran	Venezuela	7:22.37	
8	Adriana Escobar; Karla Calvo	El Salvador	7:23.83	

==== Final A ====
Rank	Rowers	Country	Time	Notes
1st place, gold medalist(s)	Liz Fenje; Katherine Sauks	Canada	6:57.23	
2nd place, silver medalist(s)	Yislena Hernandez; Licet Hernandez	Cuba	7:00.36	
3rd place, bronze medalist(s)	Sarah Giancola; Victoria Burke	United States	7:03.86	
4	Milka Kraljev; Maria Rohner	Argentina	7:07.47	
5	Caroline De Caevalho Corado; Sophia Valente Camara Py	Brazil	7:10.01	
6	Fabiola Nunez; Itzama Medina	Mexico	7:12.86	
