= Rowing at the 2011 Pan American Games – Women's quadruple sculls =

Rowing – Women's quadruple sculls at the 2011 Pan American Games
- Venue: Canoe & Rowing Course
- Dates: October 16 - October 19
- Competitors: 24 from 6 nations

Medalists
Gold medal	Maria Abalo; Maria Best; Milka Kraljev; Maria Rohner	Argentina
Silver medal	Melanie Kok; Barbara McCord; Audra Vair; Isolda Penney	Canada
Bronze medal	Megan Walsh; Michelle Sechser; Catherine Reddick; Chelsea Smith	United States

The women's quadruple sculls rowing event at the 2011 Pan American Games will be held from October 16–19 at the Canoe & Rowing Course in Ciudad Guzman. The defending Pan American Games champion is Cristin McCarty, Peggy Hyslop, Zoe Hoskins and Nathalie Maurer of Canada.

== Schedule ==
All times are Central Standard Time (UTC-6).

Date	Time	Round
October 15, 2011	10:40	Heat
October 19, 2011	10:20	Final

== Results ==
=== Heat 1 ===
Rank	Rowers	Country	Time	Notes
1	Gabriela Huerta, Montserrat Garcia, Debora Oakley, Edith Rodriguez	Mexico	6:57.90	FA
2	Maria Abalo, Maria Best, Milka Kraljev, Maria Rohner	Argentina	7:00.86	FA
3	Megan Walsh, Michelle Sechser, Catherine Reddick, Chelsea Smith	United States	7:02.71	FA
4	Melanie Kok, Barbara McCord, Audra Vair, Isolda Penney	Canada	7:03.71	FA
5	Carolina Rocha, Bianca Miarka, Kissya Costa, Carolina Rocha	Brazil	7:12.14	FA
6	Yanisleidi Orama, Yariulvis Cobas, Aimee Hernandez, Yoslaine Dominguez	Cuba	7:27.33	FA

=== Final A ===
Rank	Rowers	Country	Time	Notes
1st place, gold medalist(s)	Maria Abalo, Maria Best, Milka Kraljev, Maria Rohner	Argentina	6:34.46	
2nd place, silver medalist(s)	Melanie Kok, Barbara McCord, Audra Vair, Isolda Penney	Canada	6:37.68	
3rd place, bronze medalist(s)	Megan Walsh, Michelle Sechser, Catherine Reddick, Chelsea Smith	United States	6:39.36	
4	Yanisleidi Orama, Yariulvis Cobas, Aimee Hernandez, Yoslaine Dominguez	Cuba	6:40.05	
5	Gabriela Huerta, Montserrat Garcia, Debora Oakley, Edith Rodriguez	Mexico	6:42.26	
6	Carolina Rocha, Bianca Miarka, Kissya Costa, Carolina Rocha	Brazil	6:45.57	
