= Rowing at the 2016 Summer Olympics – Women's lightweight double sculls =

Women's lightweight double sculls at the Games of the XXXI Olympiad
- Venue: Rodrigo de Freitas Lagoon
- Date: 8–12 August 2016
- Competitors: 40 from 20 nations
- Winning time: 7:04.73

Medalists
1st place, gold medalist(s)		Ilse Paulis; Maaike Head	Netherlands
2nd place, silver medalist(s)		Lindsay Jennerich; Patricia Obee	Canada
3rd place, bronze medalist(s)		Huang Wenyi; Pan Feihong	China

The women's lightweight double sculls competition at the 2016 Summer Olympics in Rio de Janeiro was held on 8–12 August at the Lagoon Rodrigo de Freitas.

The medals for the competition were presented by Poul-Erik Høyer, Denmark, a member of the International Olympic Committee, and the gifts were presented by Tricia Smith, Canada, Vice President of the International Rowing Federation.

== Results ==
=== Heats ===
First two of each heat qualify to the semifinals, remainder goes to the repechage.

==== Heat 1 ====
Rank	Rower	Country	Time	Notes
1	Huang Wenyi; Pan Feihong	China	7:00.13	SA/B
2	Anne Lolk Thomsen; Juliane Rasmussen	Denmark	7:01.84	SA/B
3	Devery Karz; Kathleen Bertko	United States	7:07.37	R
4	Laura Milani; Valentina Rodini	Italy	7:09.12	R
5	Charlotte Taylor; Katherine Copeland	Great Britain	7:10.25	R

==== Heat 2 ====
Rank	Rower	Country	Time	Notes
1	Ilse Paulis; Maaike Head	Netherlands	6:57.28	SA/B
2	Sophie MacKenzie; Julia Edward	New Zealand	7:02.01	SA/B
3	Ionela-Livia Lehaci; Gianina Beleagă	Romania	7:07.29	R
4	Ayami Oishi; Chiaki Tomita	Japan	7:15.75	R
5	Tạ Thanh Huyền; Hồ Thị Lý	Vietnam	7:29.91	R

==== Heat 3 ====
Rank	Rower	Country	Time	Notes
1	Kirsten McCann; Ursula Grobler	South Africa	7:07.37	SA/B
2	Claire Lambe; Sinéad Lynch	Ireland	7:10.91	SA/B
3	Vanessa Cozzi; Fernanda Ferreira	Brazil	7:20.79	R
4	Yislena Hernández; Licet Hernández	Cuba	7:26.43	R
5	Khadija Krimi; Nour El-Houda Ettaieb	Tunisia	7:43.33	R

==== Heat 4 ====
Rank	Rower	Country	Time	Notes
1	Lindsay Jennerich; Patricia Obee	Canada	7:03.51	SA/B
2	Weronika Deresz; Martyna Mikołajczak	Poland	7:05.02	SA/B
3	Fini Sturm; Marie-Louise Dräger	Germany	7:11.08	R
4	Josefa Vila; Melita Abraham	Chile	7:20.63	R
5	Lee Yuen Yin; Lee Ka Man	Hong Kong	7:29.87	R

=== Repechage ===
First two of each heat qualify to the semifinals A/B, remainder goes to the semifinals C/D.

==== Repechage 1 ====
Rank	Rower	Country	Time	Notes
1	Devery Karz; Kathleen Bertko	United States	7:58.90	SA/B
2	Ayami Oishi; Chiaki Tomita	Japan	8:00.50	SA/B
3	Charlotte Taylor; Katherine Copeland	Great Britain	8:05.70	SC/D
4	Josefa Vila; Melita Abraham	Chile	8:11.97	SC/D
5	Vanessa Cozzi; Fernanda Ferreira	Brazil	8:15.53	SC/D
6	Lee Yuen Yin; Lee Ka Man	Hong Kong	8:20.96	SC/D

==== Repechage 2 ====
Rank	Rower	Country	Time	Notes
1	Ionela-Livia Lehaci; Gianina Beleagă	Romania	8:00.47	SA/B
2	Fini Sturm; Marie-Louise Dräger	Germany	8:02.28	SA/B
3	Laura Milani; Valentina Rodini	Italy	8:03.03	SC/D
4	Tạ Thanh Huyền; Hồ Thị Lý	Vietnam	8:19.79	SC/D
5	Yislena Hernández; Licet Hernández	Cuba	8:22.05	SC/D
6	Khadija Krimi; Nour El-Houda Ettaieb	Tunisia	8:33.49	SC/D

=== Semifinals C/D ===
First three of each heat qualify to the Final C, remainder goes to the Final D.

==== Semifinal C/D 1 ====
Rank	Rower	Country	Time	Notes
1	Charlotte Taylor; Katherine Copeland	Great Britain	7:59.11	FC
2	Lee Yuen Yin; Lee Ka Man	Hong Kong	8:14.17	FC
3	Tạ Thanh Huyền; Hồ Thị Lý	Vietnam	8:18.47	FC
4	Yislena Hernández; Licet Hernández	Cuba	8:27.44	FD

==== Semifinal C/D 2 ====
Rank	Rower	Country	Time	Notes
1	Laura Milani; Valentina Rodini	Italy	8:11.21	FC
2	Vanessa Cozzi; Fernanda Ferreira	Brazil	8:14.06	FC
3	Josefa Vila; Melita Abraham	Chile	8:20.26	FC
4	Khadija Krimi; Nour El-Houda Ettaieb	Tunisia	8:29.45	FD

=== Semifinals A/B ===
==== Semifinals A/B 1 ====
First three of each heat qualify to the Final A, remainder goes to the Final B.

Rank	Rower	Country	Time	Notes
1	Kirsten McCann; Ursula Grobler	South Africa	7:19.09	FA
2	Sophie MacKenzie; Julia Edward	New Zealand	7:19.27	FA
3	Huang Wenyi; Pan Feihong	China	7:20.94	FA
4	Ionela-Livia Lehaci; Gianina Beleagă	Romania	7:21.38	FB
5	Weronika Deresz; Martyna Mikołajczak	Poland	7:22.06	FB
6	Ayami Oishi; Chiaki Tomita	Japan	7:46.41	FB

==== Semifinals A/B 2 ====
First three of each heat qualify to the Final A, remainder goes to the Final B.

Rank	Rower	Country	Time	Notes
1	Ilse Paulis; Maaike Head	Netherlands	7:13.93	FA
2	Lindsay Jennerich; Patricia Obee	Canada	7:16.35	FA
3	Claire Lambe; Sinéad Lynch	Ireland	7:18.24	FA
4	Anne Lolk Thomsen; Juliane Rasmussen	Denmark	7:20.29	FB
5	Devery Karz; Kathleen Bertko	United States	7:22.78	FB
6	Fini Sturm; Marie-Louise Dräger	Germany	7:33.21	FB

=== Finals ===
==== Final D ====
Rank	Rower	Country	Time	Notes
1	Yislena Hernández; Licet Hernández	Cuba	7:50.21	
2	Khadija Krimi; Nour El-Houda Ettaieb	Tunisia	7:56.26	

==== Final C ====
Rank	Rower	Country	Time	Notes
1	Laura Milani; Valentina Rodini	Italy	7:36.64	
2	Charlotte Taylor; Katherine Copeland	Great Britain	7:37.89	
3	Vanessa Cozzi; Fernanda Ferreira	Brazil	7:44.78	
4	Lee Yuen Yin; Lee Ka Man	Hong Kong	7:46.85	
5	Josefa Vila; Melita Abraham	Chile	7:46.99	
6	Tạ Thanh Huyền; Hồ Thị Lý	Vietnam	DNS	

==== Final B ====
Rank	Rower	Country	Time	Notes
1	Weronika Deresz; Martyna Mikołajczak	Poland	7:24.34	
2	Ionela-Livia Lehaci; Gianina Beleagă	Romania	7:24.61	
3	Anne Lolk Thomsen; Juliane Rasmussen	Denmark	7:27.36	
4	Devery Karz; Kathleen Bertko	United States	7:29.96	
5	Fini Sturm; Marie-Louise Dräger	Germany	7:32.73	
6	Ayami Oishi; Chiaki Tomita	Japan	7:42.87	

==== Final A ====
Rank	Rower	Country	Time	Notes
1st place, gold medalist(s)	Ilse Paulis; Maaike Head	Netherlands	7:04.73	
2nd place, silver medalist(s)	Lindsay Jennerich; Patricia Obee	Canada	7:05.88	
3rd place, bronze medalist(s)	Huang Wenyi; Pan Feihong	China	7:06.49	
4	Sophie MacKenzie; Julia Edward	New Zealand	7:10.61	
5	Kirsten McCann; Ursula Grobler	South Africa	7:11.26	
6	Claire Lambe; Sinéad Lynch	Ireland	7:13.09	
