= 2017 World Rowing Championships – Women's lightweight single sculls =

Women's lightweight single sculls at the 2017 World Rowing Championships
- Venue: Nathan Benderson Park
- Location: Sarasota, United States
- Dates: 24–29 September
- Competitors: 15 from 15 nations
- Winning time: 7:38.78

Medalists
gold medal	Kirsten McCann	South Africa
silver medal	Marieke Keijser	Netherlands
bronze medal	Mary Jones	United States

The women's lightweight single sculls competition at the 2017 World Rowing Championships in Sarasota took place in Nathan Benderson Park.

== Schedule ==
The schedule was as follows:

Date	Time	Round
Sunday 24 September 2017	10:51	Heats
Tuesday 26 September 2017	12:03	Repechage
Thursday 28 September 2017	10:31	Semifinals A/B
Thursday 28 September 2017	13:36	Final C
Friday 29 September 2017	09:10	Final B
Friday 29 September 2017	12:30	Final A

All times are Eastern Daylight Time (UTC-4)

== Results ==
=== Heats ===
The three fastest boats in each heat advanced directly to the A/B semifinals. The remaining boats were sent to the repechage.

==== Heat 1 ====
Rank	Rowers	Country	Time	Notes
1	Marieke Keijser	Netherlands	7:45.39	SA/B
2	Emma Fredh	Sweden	7:46.22	SA/B
3	Licet Hernández	Cuba	7:58.09	SA/B
4	Lee Ka Man	Hong Kong	8:02.47	R
5	Choi Yu-ri	South Korea	8:12.11	R

==== Heat 2 ====
Rank	Rowers	Country	Time	Notes
1	Patricia Merz	Switzerland	7:41.63	SA/B
2	Mary Jones	United States	7:42.49	SA/B
3	Martyna Mikołajczak	Poland	7:47.74	SA/B
4	Kenia Lechuga	Mexico	8:11.87	R
5	Gabriela Mosqueira	Paraguay	8:29.40	R

==== Heat 3 ====
Rank	Rowers	Country	Time	Notes
1	Denise Walsh	Ireland	7:43.87	SA/B
2	Kirsten McCann	South Africa	7:44.38	SA/B
3	Clara Guerra	Italy	7:50.89	SA/B
4	Leonie Pieper	Germany	8:03.34	R
5	Nour El-Houda Ettaieb	Tunisia	8:37.95	R

=== Repechage ===
The three fastest boats advanced to the A/B semifinals. The remaining boats were sent to the C final.

Rank	Rowers	Country	Time	Notes
1	Leonie Pieper	Germany	7:56.52	SA/B
2	Kenia Lechuga	Mexico	7:59.12	SA/B
3	Lee Ka Man	Hong Kong	8:02.22	SA/B
4	Choi Yu-ri	South Korea	8:13.54	FC
5	Gabriela Mosqueira	Paraguay	8:21.77	FC
6	Nour El-Houda Ettaieb	Tunisia	8:24.31	FC

=== Semifinals ===
The three fastest boats in each semi advanced to the A final. The remaining boats were sent to the B final.

==== Semifinal 1 ====
Rank	Rowers	Country	Time	Notes
1	Kirsten McCann	South Africa	7:39.55	FA
2	Patricia Merz	Switzerland	7:39.63	FA
3	Marieke Keijser	Netherlands	7:49.17	FA
4	Martyna Mikołajczak	Poland	7:56.88	FB
5	Leonie Pieper	Germany	8:00.87	FB
6	Lee Ka Man	Hong Kong	8:12.59	FB

==== Semifinal 2 ====
Rank	Rowers	Country	Time	Notes
1	Denise Walsh	Ireland	7:45.89	FA
2	Mary Jones	United States	7:46.54	FA
3	Emma Fredh	Sweden	7:46.78	FA
4	Kenia Lechuga	Mexico	7:55.48	FB
5	Clara Guerra	Italy	7:58.60	FB
–	Licet Hernández	Cuba	DNS	–

=== Finals ===
The A final determined the rankings for places 1 to 6. Additional rankings were determined in the other finals.

==== Final C ====
Rank	Rowers	Country	Time
1	Choi Yu-ri	South Korea	8:15.88
2	Gabriela Mosqueira	Paraguay	8:21.38
3	Nour El-Houda Ettaieb	Tunisia	8:25.74

==== Final B ====
Rank	Rowers	Country	Time
1	Kenia Lechuga	Mexico	7:50.78
2	Clara Guerra	Italy	7:53.73
3	Martyna Mikołajczak	Poland	8:00.30
4	Leonie Pieper	Germany	8:06.14
5	Lee Ka Man	Hong Kong	8:16.22

==== Final A ====
Rank	Rowers	Country	Time
1st place, gold medalist(s)	Kirsten McCann	South Africa	7:38.78
2nd place, silver medalist(s)	Marieke Keijser	Netherlands	7:41.00
3rd place, bronze medalist(s)	Mary Jones	United States	7:42.45
4	Patricia Merz	Switzerland	7:43.38
5	Emma Fredh	Sweden	7:44.93
6	Denise Walsh	Ireland	7:49.27
