= Rowing at the 2011 Pan American Games – Women's double sculls =

Rowing – Women's double sculls at the 2011 Pan American Games
- Venue: Canoe & Rowing Course
- Dates: October 15 - October 17
- Competitors: 14 from 7 nations

Medalists
Gold medal	Yariulvis Cobas; Aimee Hernandez	Cuba
Silver medal	Megan Walsh; Catherine Reddick	United States
Bronze medal	Barbara McCord; Audra Vair	Canada

The women's double sculls rowing event at the 2011 Pan American Games was held from October 15–17 at the Canoe & Rowing Course in Ciudad Guzman. The defending Pan American Games champion is Sarah Trowbridge & Margaret Matia of the United States.

== Schedule ==
All times are Central Standard Time (UTC-6).

Date	Time	Round
October 15, 2011	9:00	Heats
October 15, 2011	16:30	Repechage
October 17, 2011	9:24	Final

== Results ==
=== Heat 1 ===
Rank	Rowers	Country	Time	Notes
1	Yariulvis Cobas, Aimee Hernandez	Cuba	7:30.02	FA
2	Milka Kraljev, Maria Rohner	Argentina	7:33.23	R
3	Bianca Miarka, Carolina Rocha	Brazil	7:59.38	R
4	Ana Vanegas, Maria Vanegas	Nicaragua	8:52.91	R

=== Heat 2 ===
Rank	Rowers	Country	Time	Notes
1	Barbara McCord, Audra Vair	Canada	7:23.95	FA
2	Megan Walsh, Catherine Reddick	United States	7:24.97	R
3	Gabriela Huerta, Fabiola Nuñez	Mexico	7:33.24	R

=== Repechage ===
Rank	Rowers	Country	Time	Notes
1	Megan Walsh, Catherine Reddick	United States	7:23.52	FA
2	Bianca Miarka, Carolina Rocha	Brazil	7:23.90	FA
3	Gabriela Huerta, Fabiola Nuñez	Mexico	7:32.02	FA
4	Milka Kraljev, Maria Rohner	Argentina	8:20.65	FA
5	Ana Vanegas, Maria Vanegas	Nicaragua	8:56.17	

=== Final A ===
Rank	Rowers	Country	Time	Notes
1st place, gold medalist(s)	Yariulvis Cobas, Aimee Hernandez	Cuba	7:13.76	
2nd place, silver medalist(s)	Megan Walsh, Catherine Reddick	United States	7:14.34	
3rd place, bronze medalist(s)	Barbara McCord, Audra Vair	Canada	7:16.29	
4	Gabriela Huerta, Fabiola Nuñez	Mexico	7:20.48	
5	Bianca Miarka, Carolina Rocha	Brazil	7:21.32	
6	Milka Kraljev, Maria Rohner	Argentina	7:22.10	
