= Ursula Grobler =

South African rower (born 1980)

Personal information
- Nationality: South African
- Born: 6 February 1980 (age 46)
- Height: 173 cm (5 ft 8 in)
- Weight: 60 kg (132 lb)

Sport
- Sport: Rowing
Medal record
Women's rowing
World Championships
Representing South Africa
Bronze medal – third place	2015 Aiguebelette	LW2x
Representing United States
Silver medal – second place	2010 Karapiro	LW4x

Ursula Grobler (born 6 February 1980) is a South African competitive rower who resides in Pretoria, South Africa.

== Biography ==
Grobler was born in 1980 in Pretoria, South Africa. Until the end of the 2012 rowing season, she competed for the United States and lived in Seattle. Since the 2013 rowing season, she has competed for South Africa.

== Rowing for the USA ==
In 2009, she won the open women's event in Head of the Charles. She won a gold medal at the 2010 World Rowing Cup I at Bled in Slovenia in the lightweight women's double sculls with Abelyn Broughton. She won a silver medal at the 2010 World Rowing Championships at Lake Karapiro in New Zealand with the lightweight women's quadruple sculls of the United States, alongside Victoria Burke, Kristin Hedstrom, and Abelyn Broughton.

== Rowing for South Africa ==
Since coming back to South Africa, she won a bronze medal in the Lightweight Women's Single scull in Luzern, Switzerland in 2013. With teammate Kirsten McCann, she finished 4th in the World Rowing Championships in Amsterdam in 2014 and won the bronze medal in the World Rowing Championships in 2015 in Aiguebelette, France. This made them the first women's crew to medal for South Africa in a World Rowing Championships. This position also qualified them for the Rio Olympic Games.

Grobler competed at the 2016 Summer Olympics in Rio de Janeiro, in the women's lightweight double sculls, where she was the oldest member of the South African rowing team. She and teammate Kirsten McCann finished in fifth place.
