= Rowing at the 2014 Asian Games – Women's lightweight double sculls =

Women's lightweight double sculls at the 2014 Asian Games
- Venue: Tangeum Lake
- Date: 21–25 September 2014
- Competitors: 10 from 5 nations

Medalists
gold medal	Zhang Huan; Chen Le	China
silver medal	Eri Wakai; Asumi Suehiro	Japan
bronze medal	Rojjana Raklao; Phuttharaksa Neegree	Thailand

The women's lightweight double sculls competition at the 2014 Asian Games in Chungju, South Korea was held from 21 September to 25 September at the Tangeum Lake International Rowing Center.

== Schedule ==
All times are Korea Standard Time (UTC+09:00)

Date	Time	Event
Sunday, 21 September 2014	10:20	Heat
Thursday, 25 September 2014	11:00	Final

== Results ==
=== Heat ===
- Qualification: 1–5 → Final (FA)

Rank	Team	Time	Notes
1	China (CHN); Zhang Huan; Chen Le	7:23.78	FA
2	Thailand (THA); Rojjana Raklao; Phuttharaksa Neegree	7:29.62	FA
3	Japan (JPN); Eri Wakai; Asumi Suehiro	7:31.55	FA
4	Indonesia (INA); Yuniarti; Maryam Magdalena Daimoi	7:43.42	FA
5	Hong Kong (HKG); Lee Yuen Yin; Shiu Ho Yan	7:54.55	FA

=== Final ===
Rank	Team	Time
1st place, gold medalist(s)	China (CHN); Zhang Huan; Chen Le	7:18.95
2nd place, silver medalist(s)	Japan (JPN); Eri Wakai; Asumi Suehiro	7:26.15
3rd place, bronze medalist(s)	Thailand (THA); Rojjana Raklao; Phuttharaksa Neegree	7:26.22
4	Indonesia (INA); Yuniarti; Maryam Magdalena Daimoi	7:33.43
5	Hong Kong (HKG); Lee Yuen Yin; Shiu Ho Yan	7:45.49
