= Rowing at the 2002 Asian Games – Women's double sculls =

2002 double sculls competition in South Korea

Women's double sculls at the 2002 Asian Games
- Venue: Nakdong River
- Date: 30 September – 3 October 2002
- Competitors: 16 from 8 nations

Medalists
gold medal	Dang Junling; Li Qin	China
silver medal	Akiko Iwamoto; Atsuko Yamauchi	Japan
bronze medal	Ri Ryon-hwa; Kim Mi-sun	North Korea

The women's double sculls competition at the 2002 Asian Games in Busan was held from 30 September to 3 October at the Nakdong River.

== Schedule ==
All times are Korea Standard Time (UTC+09:00)

Date	Time	Event
Monday, 30 September 2002	13:10	Heats
Tuesday, 1 October 2002	13:40	Repechage
Thursday, 3 October 2002	12:15	Finals

== Results ==
=== Heats ===
- Qualification: 1 → Final A (FA), 2–4 → Repechage (R)

==== Heat 1 ====
Rank	Team	Time	Notes
1	China (CHN); Dang Junling; Li Qin	7:21.02	FA
2	North Korea (PRK); Ri Ryon-hwa; Kim Mi-sun	7:35.70	R
3	Kazakhstan (KAZ); Vera Filimonova; Vera Nabiyeva	7:47.27	R
4	Uzbekistan (UZB); Sevara Ganieva; Zarrina Ganieva	8:01.83	R

==== Heat 2 ====
Rank	Team	Time	Notes
1	Japan (JPN); Akiko Iwamoto; Atsuko Yamauchi	7:29.24	FA
2	Chinese Taipei (TPE); Lai Hung-wen; Lin Pei-yin	7:38.44	R
3	South Korea (KOR); Oh Su-jung; Kim Ok-kyung	7:40.46	R
4	Indonesia (INA); Pere Karoba; Enggelina Ohello	7:41.24	R

=== Repechage ===
- Qualification: 1–4 → Final A (FA), 5–6 → Final B (FB)

Rank	Team	Time	Notes
1	North Korea (PRK); Ri Ryon-hwa; Kim Mi-sun	7:33.83	FA
2	South Korea (KOR); Oh Su-jung; Kim Ok-kyung	7:37.96	FA
3	Chinese Taipei (TPE); Lai Hung-wen; Lin Pei-yin	7:40.62	FA
4	Indonesia (INA); Pere Karoba; Enggelina Ohello	7:43.18	FA
5	Kazakhstan (KAZ); Vera Filimonova; Vera Nabiyeva	7:47.74	FB
6	Uzbekistan (UZB); Sevara Ganieva; Zarrina Ganieva	8:01.54	FB

=== Finals ===
==== Final B ====
Rank	Team	Time
1	Kazakhstan (KAZ); Vera Filimonova; Vera Nabiyeva	8:55.01
2	Uzbekistan (UZB); Sevara Ganieva; Zarrina Ganieva	9:36.68

==== Final A ====
Rank	Team	Time
1st place, gold medalist(s)	China (CHN); Dang Junling; Li Qin	8:16.95
2nd place, silver medalist(s)	Japan (JPN); Akiko Iwamoto; Atsuko Yamauchi	8:30.26
3rd place, bronze medalist(s)	North Korea (PRK); Ri Ryon-hwa; Kim Mi-sun	8:38.42
4	South Korea (KOR); Oh Su-jung; Kim Ok-kyung	8:40.46
5	Chinese Taipei (TPE); Lai Hung-wen; Lin Pei-yin	8:46.28
6	Indonesia (INA); Pere Karoba; Enggelina Ohello	8:46.49
