= Rowing at the 2002 Asian Games – Women's coxless four =

Women's coxless four at the 2002 Asian Games
- Venue: Nakdong River
- Date: 2 October 2002
- Competitors: 24 from 6 nations

Medalists
| gold medal | China; Cong Huanling, Yu Jing, Han Jing, Yan Na |
| silver medal | Chinese Taipei; Chiang Chien-ju, Chi Yao-hsuan, Yu Chen-chun, Su Hui-ching |
| bronze medal | Uzbekistan; Sevara Ganieva, Albina Ahmerova, Zarrina Ganieva, Anna Kuznetsova |

The women's coxless four competition at the 2002 Asian Games in Busan was held on 2 October 2002 at the Nakdong River Rowing and Canoeing Courses.

== Schedule ==
All times are Korea Standard Time (UTC+09:00)

| Date | Time | Event |
|---|---|---|
| Wednesday, 2 October 2002 | 11:30 | Final |

== Results ==
| Rank | Team | Time |
|---|---|---|
| 1st place, gold medalist(s) | China (CHN); Cong Huanling; Yu Jing; Han Jing; Yan Na | 7:44.57 |
| 2nd place, silver medalist(s) | Chinese Taipei (TPE); Chiang Chien-ju; Chi Yao-hsuan; Yu Chen-chun; Su Hui-ching | 8:05.41 |
| 3rd place, bronze medalist(s) | Uzbekistan (UZB); Sevara Ganieva; Albina Ahmerova; Zarrina Ganieva; Anna Kuznetsova | 8:13.66 |
| 4 | South Korea (KOR); Im Jin-sun; Kim Mi-jung; Sim Young-ok; Lee Hee-sun | 8:23.45 |
| 5 | Myanmar (MYA); Soe Yu Maw; Myint Myint Win; Yin Yin Htwe; Chaw Su | 8:29.50 |
| 6 | India (IND); Jincymol Verghese; Julee Varghese; Monalisa Mohanty; Sobini Rajan | 8:36.66 |
