= Rowing at the 2018 Central American and Caribbean Games =

Sports event

- Venue: Calima Lake
- Dates: 20–23 July

The rowing competition at the 2018 Central American and Caribbean Games was held from 20 to 23 July at Calima Lake.

== Medal summary ==
=== Men's events ===
Event	Gold		Silver		Bronze	
M1x	Ángel Fournier (CUB)	6:57.87	Juan Cabrera (MEX)	6:59.01	Joseph Purman (PUR)	7:18.22
LM1x	Alexis López (MEX)	7:53.96	Yhoan Uribarri (CUB)	8:00.66	José Guipe (VEN)	8:03.44
M2x	Cuba (CUB); Adrián Oquendo; Ángel Fournier	6:56.56	Mexico (MEX); Diego Sánchez; Juan Flores	7:00.07	Venezuela (VEN); Jackson Vicent; Ali Leiva	7:02.18
M2-	Cuba (CUB); Adrián Oquendo; Ángel Fournier	7:27.34	Mexico (MEX); Diego Sánchez; Juan Flores	7:31.26	Venezuela (VEN); Jackson Vicent; Ali Leiva	7:49.09
LM2x	Mexico (MEX); Alan Armenta; Alexis López	6:58.90	Cuba (CUB); Alexei Carballosa; Yhoan Uribarri	7:04.44	Guatemala (GUA); Gerardo Campa; Gunther Slowing	7:05.37
LM2-	Mexico (MEX); Francisco González; Adolfo Peralta	7:09.15	Venezuela (VEN); Agustín Betancourt; Luis Ollarves	7:15.26	Cuba (CUB); Maximo Arango; Ismel Barcelo	7:15.83

=== Women's events ===
Event	Gold		Silver		Bronze	
W1x	Yariulvis Cobas (CUB)	9:13.05	Felice Chow (TTO)	9:26.24	Naiara Arrillaga (MEX)	9:41.22
LW1x	Kenia Lechuga (MEX)	8:40.74	Ilianny Román (CUB)	8:53.75	Adriana Escobar (ESA)	9:12.30
W2x	Cuba (CUB); Aimée Hernández; Yariulvis Cobas	7:20.29	Mexico (MEX); Kenia Lechuga; Maite Arrillaga	7:23.57	El Salvador (ESA); Adriana Escobar; Jessica Hernández	7:42.19
W2-	Mexico (MEX); Fernanda Ceballos; Maite Arrillaga	8:00.94	Cuba (CUB); Aimée Hernández; Yariulvis Cobas	8:11.01	Nicaragua (NCA); Ana Vanegas; Evidelia González	8:29.96
LW2x	Mexico (MEX); Kenia Lechuga; Fabiola Núñez	7:53.73	Cuba (CUB); Yislena Hernández; Ilianny Román	8:00.36	Guatemala (GUA); Yulisa López; Jennieffer Zúñiga	8:07.05

== Medal table ==
Rank	Nation	Gold	Silver	Bronze	Total
1	Mexico (MEX)	6	4	1	11
2	Cuba (CUB)	5	5	1	11
3	Venezuela (VEN)	0	1	3	4
4	Guatemala (GUA)	0	0	2	2
5	Nicaragua (NCA)	0	0	1	1
Totals (5 entries)		11	10	8	29
