= Patricia Obee =

Canadian rower

Personal information
- Nationality: Canadian
- Born: October 31, 1991 (age 34) Victoria, British Columbia
- Height: 1.76 m (5 ft 9 in)
- Weight: 57 kg (126 lb)

Sport
- Club: Victoria City Rowing Club
Medal record
Women's rowing
Representing Canada
Olympic Games
Silver medal – second place	2016 Rio de Janeiro	LW2x
World Championships
Silver medal – second place	2011 Lake Bled	LW2x
Silver medal – second place	2014 Amsterdam	LW2x
Under 23 World Rowing Championships
Bronze medal – third place	2011 Bosbaan	BLW1x

Patricia Obee (born October 31, 1991) is a Canadian rower from Victoria, British Columbia. Obee won a silver at the 2016 Olympics, 2011 World Rowing Championships and 2014 World Rowing Championships in the lightweight women's double sculls.

== Career ==
Obee teamed up with Lindsay Jennerich in the women's lightweight double sculls in 2011, after Jennerich's previous teammate, Tracy Cameron, was injured. Before this, Obee had won a medal in the single lightweight scull event at the 2011 under 23 World Championship, having made her international debut in 2010 after starting to row in high school.

Together Obee and Jennerich won silver at the 2011 World Rowing Championships. The team competed in the lightweight double sculls at the 2012 Summer Olympics, finishing in 7th place. After the Olympics, she started a degree in anthropology at the University of Washington.

Obee briefly returned to the lightweight single scull in 2013, before reteaming with Jennerich in the lightweight double scull. The team went on to win silver at the 2014 World Championships. At the Rio 2016 Summer Olympics, Obee won a silver medal in the lightweight doubles, also with Lindsay Jennerich.
