= Akiko Iwamoto =

Japanese rower (born 1978)

Personal information
- Nationality: Japanese
- Born: September 25, 1978 (age 47) Nagano Prefecture, Japan

Sport
- Sport: Rowing

Akiko Iwamoto (岩本 亜希子, Iwamoto Akiko; born September 25, 1978) is a Japanese rower. She was born in Nagano Prefecture. She competed in the Women's lightweight double sculls at the 2012 Summer Olympics, reaching the semi-finals with her teammate Atsumi Fukumoto and ranking 12th overall. She competed in the same event at the 2000, 2004 and 2008 Summer Olympics, finishing 9th, 14th and 13th respectively. She won a silver medal in the Women's double sculls at the 2002 Asian Games. She also won a silver medal in the Women's lightweight double sculls at the 2006 Asian Games, and another silver medal in the Women's lightweight double sculls at the 2010 Asian Games.
