= Rowing at the 2023 Central American and Caribbean Games =

- Venue: Club Salvadoreño of Lago Ilopango
- Location: (El Salvador) San Salvador
- Dates: 24–28 June

The rowing competition at the 2023 Central American and Caribbean Games will held from 24 to 28 July at the Club Salvadoreño of Lago Ilopango in San Salvador, El Salvador.

== Medal table ==
* Host nation (El Salvador)

Rank	Nation	Gold	Silver	Bronze	Total
1	Mexico (MEX)	9	3	0	12
2	Cuba (CUB)	3	7	0	10
3	Venezuela (VEN)	0	2	5	7
4	Dominican Republic (DOM)	0	0	2	2
4	El Salvador (ESA)*	0	0	2	2
4	Nicaragua (NCA)	0	0	2	2
7	Centro Caribe Sports (CCS)	0	0	1	1
Totals (7 entries)		12	12	12	36

== Medal summary ==
=== Men's events ===
Event	Gold		Silver		Bronze	
M1x	Juan Flores (MEX)	6:56.22	Leduar Suárez (CUB)	6:57.55	Jaime Machado (VEN)	7:13.96
LM1x	Alexis Lopez (MEX)	6:45.06	Andre Mora (VEN)	6:53.38	Ignacio Vasquez (DOM)	6:57.77
M2-	Cuba (CUB); Luis Leon; Andrey Barnet	6:28.19	Mexico (MEX); Hugo Reyes; Jordy Gutierrez	6:34.85	Venezuela (VEN); Jose Guipe; Cesar Amaris	6:54.52
LM2x	Mexico (MEX); Ricardo de la Rosa; Rafael Mejía	6:29.10	Venezuela (VEN); Luis Ollarves; José Güipe	6:35.08	Dominican Republic (DOM); Carlos Rodríguez; Ignacio Vásquez	6:42.98
M4x	Cuba (CUB); Reidy Cardona; Carlos Ajete; Roberto Paz; Leduar Suarez	5:45.47	Mexico (MEX); Ricardo De La Rosa; Miguel Carballo; Alexis Lopez; Juan Flores	5:47.95	Venezuela (VEN); Luis Ollarves; Cesar Amaris; Dixon Patino; Jakson Vicent	6:14.47

=== Women's events ===
Event	Gold		Silver		Bronze	
W1x	Maite Arrillaga (MEX)	7:54.24	Milena Venega (CUB)	7:55.03	Evidelia González (NCA)	8:18.19
LW1x	Melissa Márquez (MEX)	7:46.99	Ana Jiménez (CUB)	7:54.11	Adriana Escobar (ESA)	8:00.49
W2x	Mexico (MEX); Devanih Plata; Mildred Mercado	5:52.23	Cuba (CUB); Yariulvis Cobas; Milena Venega	5:53.26	Centro Caribe Sports (CCS); Yulisa Lopez; Lesli Gonzalez	7:13.37
W2-	Mexico (MEX); Lilian Armenta; Maite Arrillaga	7:27.93	Cuba (CUB); Natalie Morales; Yariulvis Cobas	7:37.99	Nicaragua (NCA); Evidelia González; Maria Vanegas	7:53.35
LW2x	Mexico (MEX); Melissa Marquez; Daniela Altamirano	7:14.49	Cuba (CUB); Milena Venega; Ana Jimenez	7:19.80	Venezuela (VEN); Francis Chacin; Keila Garcia	7:20.54
W4x	Cuba (CUB); Claudia Tolon; Yariulvis Cobas; Milena Venega; Ana Jimenez	6:34.77	Mexico (MEX); Mildred Mercado; Maite Arrillaga; Valeria Villanueva; Melissa Marquez	6:38.09	El Salvador (ESA); Adriana Escobar; Ariana Townsend; Anne Sirois; Karla Calvo	6:57.88

=== Mixed events ===
Event	Gold		Silver		Bronze	
MIX 4-	Mexico (MEX); Lilan Armenta; Hugo Reyes; Jordy Gutierrez; Mildred Mercado	6:24.45	Cuba (CUB); Reidy Cardona; Yariulvis Cobas; Natalie Morales; Andrey Barnet	6:27.53	Venezuela (VEN); Keila Garcia; Kimberlin Meneses; Andre Mora; Jaime Machado	6:31.46
