= Kirsten McCann =

South African rower

Personal information
- Nationality: South African
- Born: 25 August 1988 (age 37)
- Height: 170 cm (5 ft 7 in)
- Weight: 57 kg (126 lb)

Sport
- Country: South Africa
- Sport: Rowing
Medal record
Women's rowing
Representing South Africa
World Championships
Gold medal – first place	2017 Sarasota	Lwt single sculls
Bronze medal – third place	2015 Aiguebelette	Lwt double sculls

Kirsten McCann (born 25 August 1988) is a South African competitive rower.

She competed at the 2016 Summer Olympics in Rio de Janeiro, in the women's lightweight double sculls. She and teammate Ursula Grobler finished in 5th place. At the 2017 World Rowing Championships, she won gold in the women's lightweight single sculls.
