= Charlotte Booth (rower) =

British rower

Personal information
- Nationality: British
- Born: Charlotte Louise Taylor; 14 August 1985 (age 40) Huntingdon, Cambridgeshire
Medal record
Women's rowing
Representing Great Britain
World Championships
Silver medal – second place	2015 Aiguebelette	LW2x
European Championships
Gold medal – first place	2015 Poznan	Lwt double sculls

Charlotte Booth (née Taylor born 14 August 1985) is an English rower who competed in the 2016 Summer Olympics.

== Rowing career ==
She was part of the British team that topped the medal table at the 2015 World Rowing Championships at Lac d'Aiguebelette in France, where she won a silver medal as part of the lightweight double sculls with Katherine Copeland.

Booth and Copeland took part in the lightweight women's double scull in the 2016 Olympic Games, coming 14th.
