= Sophie MacKenzie =

New Zealand rower

Personal information
- Nationality: New Zealand
- Born: 31 March 1992 (age 34)
- Education: Marlborough Girls' College
- Height: 172 cm (5 ft 8 in)
- Weight: 57 kg (126 lb)

Sport
- Club: Wairau
Medal record
Women's rowing
Representing New Zealand
World Championships
| Gold medal – first place | 2014 Amsterdam | LW2x |
| Gold medal – first place | 2015 Aiguebelette | LW2x |
World U23 Championships
| Bronze medal – third place | 2012 Trakai | BLW2x |
| Bronze medal – third place | 2013 Linz | BLW2x |
| Gold medal – first place | 2014 Varese | BLW2x |

Sophie MacKenzie (born 31 March 1992) is a retired New Zealand Olympic rower and, together with Julia Edward, double world champion in the lightweight double sculls.

== Personal life ==
MacKenzie was born in 1992 and grew up in the Waihopai Valley. Her parents are Aiden and Alison MacKenzie, and she has a brother and a sister. She attended Marlborough Girls' College in Blenheim and being from a remote farm, she hasn't lived at home since age 13, but has either lived in flats or for board. She is and continues to be a member of the Wairau Rowing Club, despite having moved to Cambridge in 2012 to train at the national rowing centre. MacKenzie is gluten-intolerant and for that reason, much of her food is homemade rather than bought. She promotes healthy food recipes through a website that she runs with her friend from school, Megan Craig, a squash champion.

== Rowing career ==
At the 2012 World Rowing U23 Championships in Trakai, Lithuania, she won a bronze medal in the U23 lightweight women's double sculls with Georgia Hammond. At the 2013 World Rowing U23 Championships in Linz, Austria, she won another bronze medal in the same boat class, this time partnered with Lisa Owen. At the 2014 World Rowing U23 Championships in Varese, Italy, she became U23 world champion in this boat class with Zoe McBride. A week before the U23 world championships, she was told that she would row at elite level at the 2014 World Rowing Championships in Amsterdam, Netherlands, with Julia Edward. Lucy Strack, Edward's previous partner, had missed selection in 2014. MacKenzie and Edward had five weeks of training together before the world championships, and they became world champions in the lightweight women's double sculls in August 2014. Edward and MacKenzie repeated this feat at the 2015 World Rowing Championships.

The 2016 rowing year did not start out that successful for Edward and MacKenzie, and at both World Rowing Cups that New Zealand attended that year, they came third, beaten by different nations at those regattas. When they competed at the 2016 Summer Olympics in Rio de Janeiro later that year, they came fourth in the lightweight double sculls, which was disappointing to them. The following month, MacKenzie announced that she "needed a break" for 12 months. She would keep herself fit, but do some other activities that she had been interested in for some time, including commencing her yoga teacher training with her friend Megan Craig. Her rowing partner for the last few years, Edward, would also take a year off. Both also took the 2018 rowing season off, but neither has announced their retirement. Mackenzie announced her retirement from elite Rowing on the 17th July 2020.

== Awards ==
In 2013, she was voted Marlborough Sportswoman of the Year. In 2014 and 2015, she won the supreme award Marlborough Sportsperson of the Year. In 2016, she was again vote Marlborough Sportswoman of the Year, beaten to the supreme award by rally co-driver John Kennard. MacKenzie and Edward were team nominees in the Halberg Awards in both 2014 and 2015, but on neither occasion did they become finalists.
