= Rowing at the 2010 Asian Games – Women's single sculls =

Women's single sculls at the 2010 Asian Games
- Venue: Guangzhou International Rowing Centre
- Date: 15–19 November 2010
- Competitors: 5 from 5 nations

Medalists
gold medal	Tang Bin	China
silver medal	Shin Yeong-eun	South Korea
bronze medal	Zarrina Mihaylova	Uzbekistan

The women's single sculls competition at the 2010 Asian Games in Guangzhou, China was held from 15 November to 19 November at the International Rowing Centre.

== Schedule ==
All times are China Standard Time (UTC+08:00)

Date	Time	Event
Monday, 15 November 2010	10:00	Heat
Friday, 19 November 2010	10:00	Final

== Results ==
=== Heat ===
- Qualification: 1–5 → Final (FA)

Rank	Athlete	Time	Notes
1	Tang Bin (CHN)	7:43.58	FA
2	Shin Yeong-eun (KOR)	7:49.83	FA
3	Zarrina Mihaylova (UZB)	8:00.00	FA
4	Mariya Filimonova (KAZ)	8:02.02	FA
5	Nasim Benyaghoub (IRI)	8:46.07	FA

=== Final ===
Rank	Athlete	Time
1st place, gold medalist(s)	Tang Bin (CHN)	7:41.63
2nd place, silver medalist(s)	Shin Yeong-eun (KOR)	7:46.50
3rd place, bronze medalist(s)	Zarrina Mihaylova (UZB)	8:07.19
4	Mariya Filimonova (KAZ)	8:12.00
5	Nasim Benyaghoub (IRI)	9:08.60
