= Rianne Sigmond =

Dutch rower (born 1984)

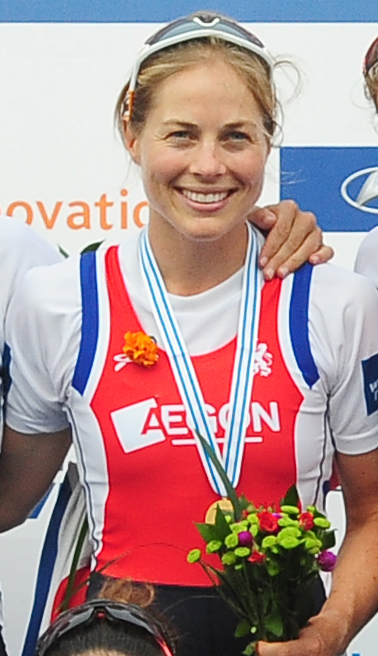
- Rianne Sigmond in 2013

Personal information
- Nationality: Dutch
- Born: 2 May 1984 (age 40); Schiedam, Netherlands

Sport
- Sport: Rowing

Rianne Sigmond (born 2 May 1984) is a Dutch rower. She competed in the women's lightweight double sculls event at the 2012 Summer Olympics.
