= Claire Lambe =

Irish rower (born 1990)

Claire Lambe (born 16 May 1990 in Dublin) is an Irish rower, who began rowing in 2005. In August 2015 she was a member of the lightweight women's double scull which qualified Lambe and her rowing partner Sinead Jennings for the Rio Olympics. They reached the finals at the Women's lightweight double sculls, coming 6th in the final.

Lambe began rowing when she was 15, on the river Liffey at Islandbridge. After initial experience at a summer camp in the Municipal Rowing Club, she began training all year round at the nearby Commercial Rowing Club. She studied mechanical engineering at University College Dublin, and received intensive rowing training from the college's Ad Astra Academy. In 2016, Lambe was reported to be studying for a master's degree in engineering at Homerton College University of Cambridge, and was a member of the winning Cambridge crew in The Boat Races 2017.

Lambe announced her retirement from international competition in February 2018.
