= Lindsay Jennerich =

Canadian rower (born 1982)

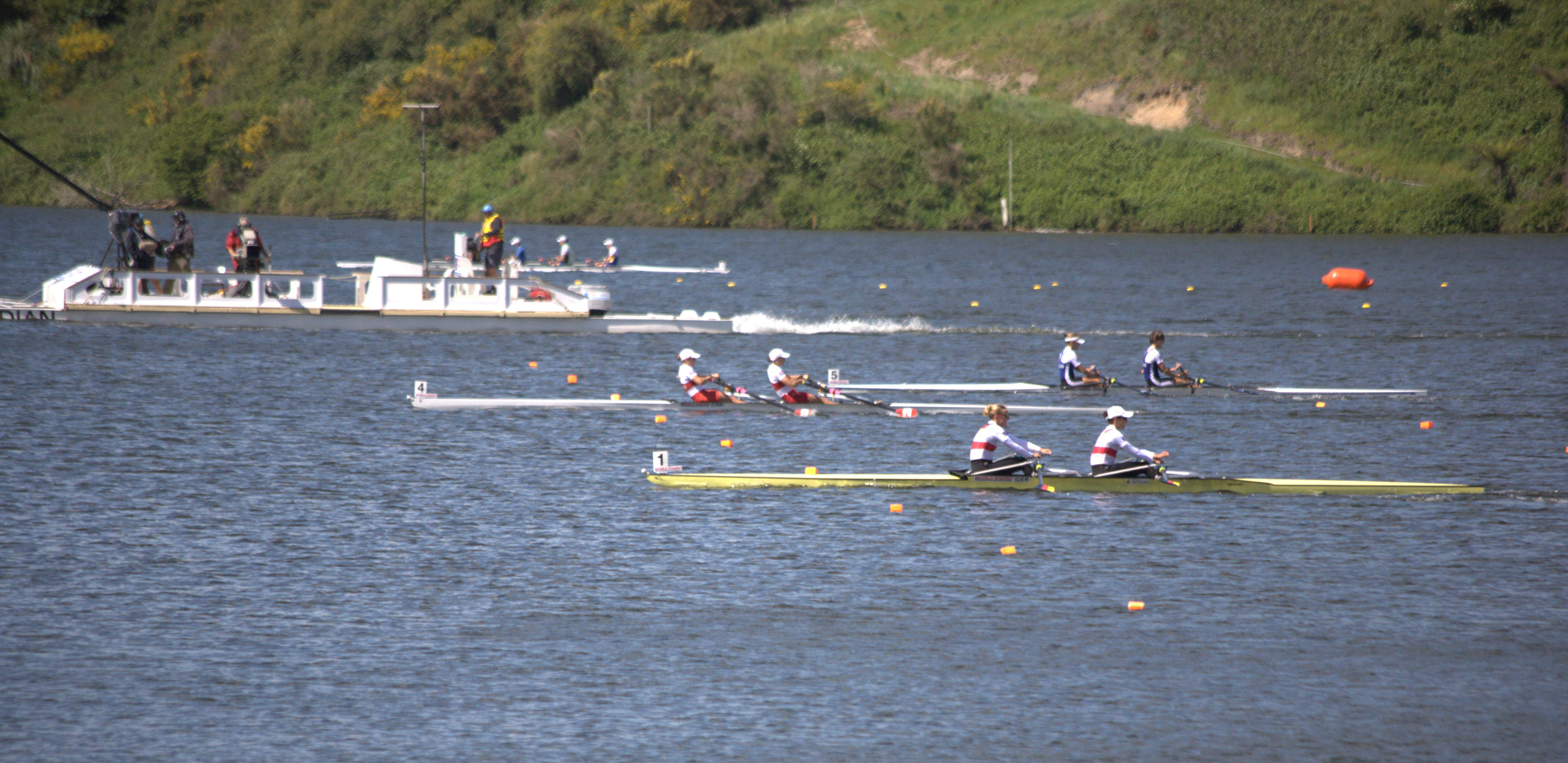
- Jennerich and Cameron (lane 4) on their way to win gold at the 2010 World Rowing Championships

Personal information
- Nationality: Canadian
- Born: July 30, 1982 (age 44) Victoria, British Columbia
- Height: 1.65 m (5 ft 5 in)
- Weight: 58 kg (128 lb)

Sport
- Club: Victoria City Rowing Club
Medal record
Women's rowing
Representing Canada
Olympic Games
| Silver medal – second place | 2016 Rio de Janeiro | LW2x |
World Championships
| Gold medal – first place | 2010 Karapiro | LW2x |
| Silver medal – second place | 2011 Bled | LW2x |
| Silver medal – second place | 2014 Amsterdam | LW2x |

Lindsay Jennerich (born 30 July 1982) is a Canadian rower. A world champion in the lightweight double sculls with Tracy Cameron, she competed in the lightweight double sculls at both the 2012 Summer Olympics and 2016 Summer Olympics, winning a silver medal in 2016 with Patricia Obee.

== Career ==
In 2010, Jennerich and Tracy Cameron won gold in the women's lightweight double sculls at the 2010 World Championships. Jennerich had previously competed in the women's lightweight single sculls and had won World Championship medals at under 23 level in the lightweight double sculls with Lysanne Lavigne, and in the women's eights at junior level. Jennerich switched to the lightweight rowing category while at the University of Victoria, after realising her frame was not suitable for "heavyweight" rowing at national and international level. She had rowed since high school. At the university, she studied kinesiology.

Jennerich teamed up with Patricia Obee in the women's lightweight double sculls in 2011, after Jennerich's previous teammate, Tracy Cameron, was injured.

Together Obee and Jennerich won silver at the 2011 World Rowing Championships. The team competed in the lightweight double sculls at the 2012 Summer Olympics finishing in 7th place.

In 2013, Jennerich briefly dropped out of rowing, before returning to compete with Obee the lightweight double scull. The team went on to win silver at the 2014 World Championships. At the Rio 2016 Summer Olympics, Obee won a silver medal in the lightweight doubles, also with Lindsay Jennerich.

In June 2016, she was officially named to Canada's 2016 Olympic team, and she won a silver medal in lightweight double sculls at the 2016 Summer Olympics. After the Olympics, she became a university rowing coach.
