= Maaike Head =

Dutch rower (born 1983)

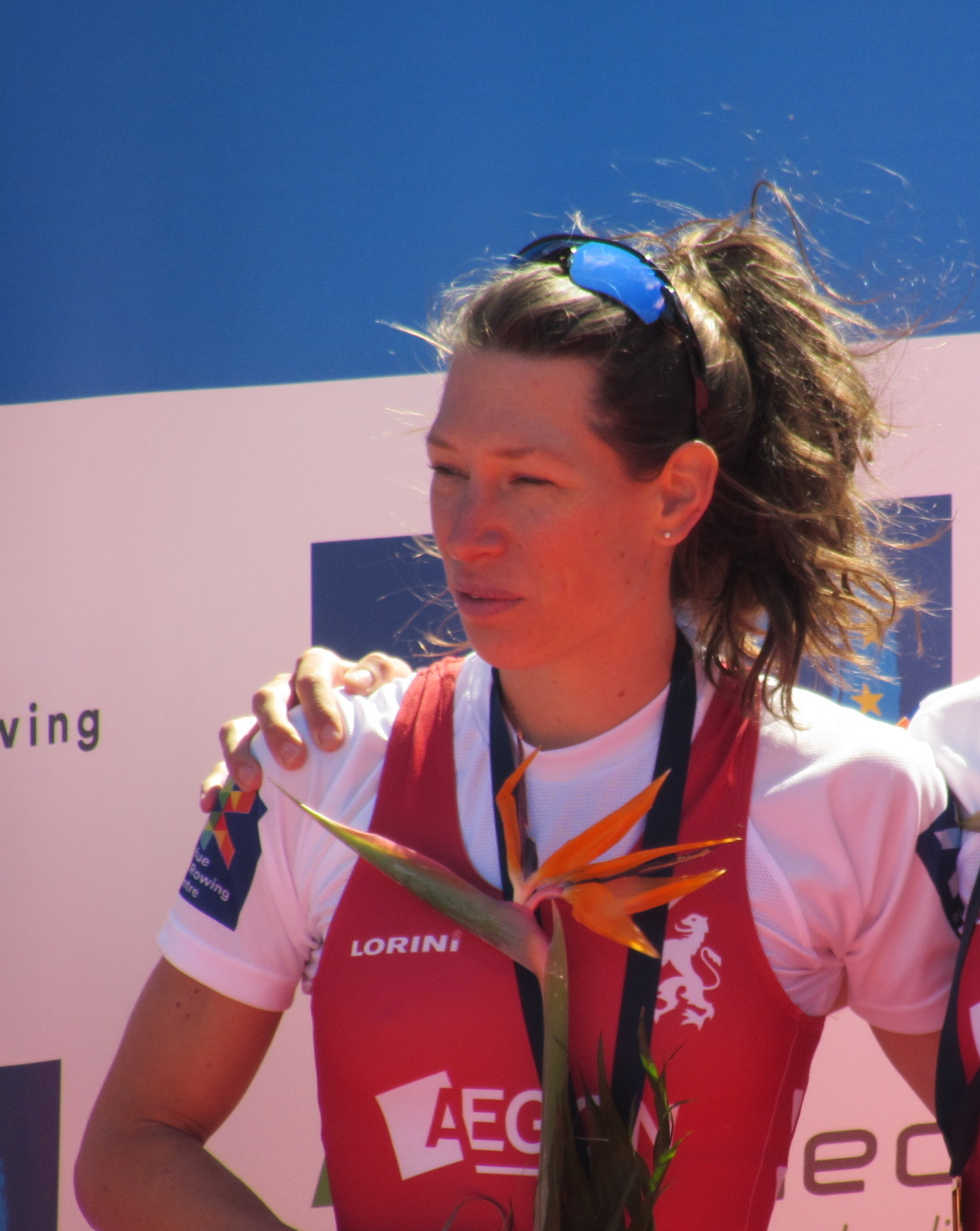
- Head in 2016

Personal information
- Full name: Maaike Christiane Head
- Nationality: Dutch
- Born: 11 September 1983 (age 42) Amsterdam, Netherlands
- Height: 173 cm (5 ft 8 in)
- Weight: 59 kg (130 lb)
Medal record
Women's rowing
Representing the Netherlands
Olympic Games
Gold medal – first place	2016 Rio de Janeiro	LW2x
World Championships
Gold medal – first place	2013 Chungjiu	LW4x
Gold medal – first place	2014 Amsterdam	LW4x
European Championships
Gold medal – first place	2016 Brandenburg	LW2x

Maaike Christiane Head (born 11 September 1983 in Amsterdam) is a Dutch rower. She competed in the lightweight double sculls at the 2012 Summer Olympics and the 2016 Summer Olympics. In the latter, she won the gold medal together with Ilse Paulis.

== Career ==
In 2016, Head and Paulis broke the world record in the lightweight double sculls.

Before rowing, she participated in speed skating, winning a gold medal in the team pursuit at the 2003 World Junior Championships in Kushiro, Japan, and participating in Dutch Allround Championships.
