= Devery Karz =

American rower

Personal information
- Born: February 18, 1988 (age 38) Park City, Utah
- Height: 5 ft 8 in (1.73 m)

Sport
- Sport: Rowing

Devery Karz (born February 18, 1988) is an American rower. She competed in the women's lightweight double sculls event at the 2016 Summer Olympics.
