= Katherine Copeland =

British rower (born 1990)

Katherine Copeland MBE
Personal information
- Nationality: English
- Born: 1 December 1990 (age 35) Ashington, Northumberland, England
- Height: 1.72 m (5 ft 7 1/2 in)
- Weight: 59 kg (130 lb)

Sport
- Country: Great Britain
- Sport: Rowing
- Club: Leander Club
Medal record
Women's Rowing
Representing Great Britain
Olympic Games
Gold medal – first place	2012 London	Lwt double sculls
World Championships
Silver medal – second place	2015 Aiguebelette	Lwt double sculls
European Championships
Gold medal – first place	2015 Poznan	Lwt double sculls
Bronze medal – third place	2014 Belgrade	Lwt double sculls
Bronze medal – third place	2017 Račice	Lwt double sculls

Katherine Sarah Copeland MBE (born 1 December 1990) is a retired British Olympic Gold Medal winning rower.

== Personal life ==
Copeland was born in Ashington, to veterinarian parents Derek and Penny. She was 14 when she first learnt to row at Yarm School. She is a member of Tees Rowing Club, Stockton-on-Tees. As a teacher, she also runs an after school art club for autistic children in conjunction with the Three Wings Trust.

She was appointed Member of the Order of the British Empire (MBE) in the 2013 New Year Honours for services to rowing.

In July 2017 she received an Honorary Degree from Teesside University.

== Career ==
An U23 World Champion in the women's lightweight single sculls, in 2012, she was selected to represent Great Britain in the 2012 London Olympics in the Women's lightweight double sculls with Sophie Hosking, winning the gold medal, during the so-called "Super Saturday".

Katherine, being brought up in Ingleby Barwick and as a part of the 2012 Summer Olympics and Paralympics gold post boxes commemoration, had a red post box in The Rings village of Ingleby Barwick painted gold in her name, with a plaque about the gold medal win.

Following her Olympic partner Hosking's retirement in 2012, Copeland partnered with Imogen Walsh in the lightweight double sculls, winning European bronze in 2014. Copeland went on to partner Charlotte Taylor, winning silver at the 2015 World Rowing Championships and gold at the 2015 European Rowing Championships.

Copeland and Taylor finished 14th in Women's lightweight double sculls at the 2016 Rio Olympics.

Copeland won another European bronze medal in the lightweight double sculls in 2017, this time with Emily Craig.

Copeland announced her retirement from competitive rowing in January 2019.
