= Fernanda Ferreira (rower) =

Brazilian rower

Personal information
- Born: 25 January 1985 (age 41) Rio de Janeiro, Brazil

Sport
- Sport: Rowing

Fernanda Nunes Leal Ferreira (born 25 January 1985) is a Brazilian rower. She competed in the women's lightweight double sculls event at the 2016 Summer Olympics.

== Recognition ==
She was recognized as one of the BBC's 100 women of 2017.
