= Melanie Kok =

Canadian rower and neuroscientist

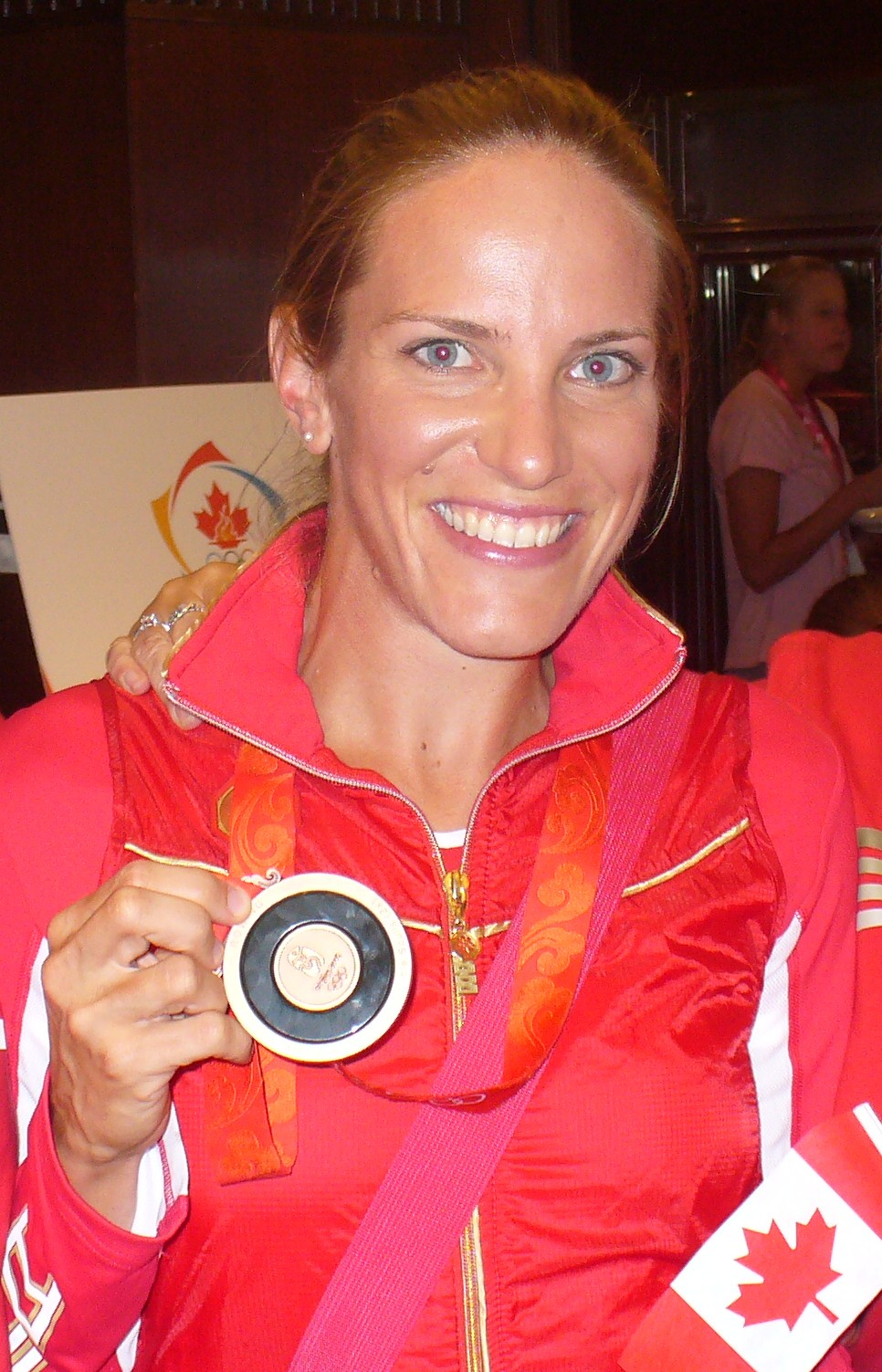
- Kok holding her bronze medal for lightweight double sculls at the 2008 Summer Olympics in Beijing

Personal information
- Full name: Melanie Kok
- Nationality: Canada
- Born: November 4, 1983 (age 42) Thunder Bay, Ontario, Canada
- Home town: St. Catharines, Ontario
- Height: 5 ft 6 in (168 cm)
- Weight: 59 kg/130 lb

Sport
- College team: University of Virginia
- Club: Ridley Graduate Boat Club
Medal record
Olympic Games
Bronze medal – third place	2008 Beijing	Lwt double sculls
World Rowing Championships
Gold medal – first place	2005 Kaizu	Lwt quadruple sculls
Bronze medal – third place	2007 Munich	Lwt single sculls
Pan American Games
Silver medal – second place	2011 Guadalajara	Quadruple sculls

Melanie Kok [pronounced "Cook"] (born November 4, 1983) is a Canadian rower and neuroscientist. Kok won a bronze team medal in the Women's Lightweight Double Sculls at the 2008 Summer Olympics with Tracy Cameron.

== Biography ==
Kok earned a B.A. at the University of Virginia in Charlottesville, Virginia, where she rowed as a varsity athlete for each of her four years as an undergraduate. Kok, a two-time team captain at UVa, earned All-American honours twice (2006, 2007). She was also named to the All-South Region and All-ACC teams. She went on to complete her master's degree in 2010 at McMaster University in Hamilton, Ontario in the MiNDS Graduate Neuroscience Program. Kok went on to complete her PhD in neuroscience at the Schulich School of Medicine and Dentistry at the University of Western Ontario in London, Ontario.

== International career ==
Kok is a five-time member of the Canadian National Rowing team. She has won two World Rowing Championships medals: a gold in Gifu, JAP (2005) in the Lightweight Quadruple Sculls with Tracy Cameron, Mara Jones and Elizabeth Urbach, and a bronze in Munich, GER (2007) in the Lightweight Single Sculls.

She has also won two World Cup medals: a gold in Poznan, POL, and a bronze in Lucerne, SUI, both in 2008.

Kok competed at the Beijing 2008 Summer Olympics in the Women's Lightweight Doubles with Tracy Cameron and won a bronze team medal.

Kok was named the City of St. Catharines Athlete of the Year in 2005, and in 2008, as a co-winner with Olympic wrestler Tonya Verbeek.

At the 2011 Pan American Games, Kok won a silver team medal in the women's quadruple sculls.
