= Yulisa López =

Guatemalan rower (born 1993)

Personal information
- Born: 10 September 1993 (age 32) Puerto Barrios, Guatemala

Sport
- Sport: Rowing
Medal record
Women's rowing
Representing Guatemala
Central American and Caribbean Games
Bronze medal – third place	2018 Barranquilla	Lwt double sculls
Central American Games
Gold medal – first place	2017 Managua	Lwt single sculls
Gold medal – first place	2017 Managua	Lwt double sculls
Silver medal – second place	2017 Managua	Single sculls
Silver medal – second place	2017 Managua	Coxless pair
Representing Centro Caribe Sports
Central American and Caribbean Games
Bronze medal – third place	2023 San Salvador	W2x double sculls

Yulisa López (born 10 September 1993) is a Guatemalan rower. She competed in the women's lightweight double sculls event at the 2020 Summer Olympics. She also won four medals, including two golds, at the 2017 Central American Games.
