= Rowing at the 2006 Asian Games – Women's lightweight double sculls =

Women's lightweight double sculls at the 2006 Asian Games
- Venue: West Bay Lagoon
- Date: 3–6 December 2006
- Competitors: 12 from 6 nations

Medalists
| gold medal | Sevara Ganieva; Zarrina Ganieva | Uzbekistan |
| silver medal | Akiko Iwamoto; Eri Wakai | Japan |
| bronze medal | Phuttharaksa Neegree; Bussayamas Phaengkathok | Thailand |

The women's lightweight double sculls competition at the 2006 Asian Games in Doha was held from 3 December to 6 December at the West Bay Lagoon.

Since Doha was scarce of water, the distance had to be shortened from the standard 2000 to 1000 meters.

== Schedule ==
All times are Arabia Standard Time (UTC+03:00)

| Date | Time | Event |
|---|---|---|
| Sunday, 3 December 2006 | 10:20 | Heats |
| Monday, 4 December 2006 | 10:00 | Repechage |
| Wednesday, 6 December 2006 | 10:50 | Finals |

== Results ==
=== Heats ===
- Qualification: 1 → Final A (FA), 2–3 → Repechage (R)

==== Heat 1 ====
| Rank | Team | Time | Notes |
|---|---|---|---|
| 1 | China (CHN); Yu Hua; Yan Shimin | 4:34.55 | FA |
| 2 | North Korea (PRK); Kim Ok-bong; Pak Ok-ju | 5:01.86 | R |
| 3 | Chinese Taipei (TPE); Lu Ming-chen; Liu Yu-hsin | 5:10.01 | R |

==== Heat 2 ====
| Rank | Team | Time | Notes |
|---|---|---|---|
| 1 | Japan (JPN); Akiko Iwamoto; Eri Wakai | 4:30.45 | FA |
| 2 | Uzbekistan (UZB); Sevara Ganieva; Zarrina Ganieva | 4:57.93 | R |
| 3 | Thailand (THA); Phuttharaksa Neegree; Bussayamas Phaengkathok | 5:23.25 | R |

=== Repechage ===
- Qualification: 1–2 → Final A (FA), 3–4 → Final B (FB)

| Rank | Team | Time | Notes |
|---|---|---|---|
| 1 | Thailand (THA); Phuttharaksa Neegree; Bussayamas Phaengkathok | 4:20.20 | FA |
| 2 | Uzbekistan (UZB); Sevara Ganieva; Zarrina Ganieva | 4:24.46 | FA |
| 3 | Chinese Taipei (TPE); Lu Ming-chen; Liu Yu-hsin | 4:31.84 | FB |
| 4 | North Korea (PRK); Kim Ok-bong; Pak Ok-ju | 4:32.80 | FB |

=== Finals ===
==== Final B ====
| Rank | Team | Time |
|---|---|---|
| 1 | Chinese Taipei (TPE); Lu Ming-chen; Liu Yu-hsin | 4:04.49 |
| 2 | North Korea (PRK); Kim Ok-bong; Pak Ok-ju | 4:15.03 |

==== Final A ====
| Rank | Team | Time |
|---|---|---|
| 1st place, gold medalist(s) | Uzbekistan (UZB); Sevara Ganieva; Zarrina Ganieva | 3:44.54 |
| 2nd place, silver medalist(s) | Japan (JPN); Akiko Iwamoto; Eri Wakai | 3:46.03 |
| 3rd place, bronze medalist(s) | Thailand (THA); Phuttharaksa Neegree; Bussayamas Phaengkathok | 3:47.00 |
| 4 | China (CHN); Yu Hua; Yan Shimin | 3:48.14 |
