= Kristin Hedstrom =

American rower

Medal record

Women's rowing

Representing United States

World Championships
Silver medal – second place	2010 Karapiro	Lightweight Quadruple Sculls
Silver medal – second place	2013 Chungjiu	Lightweight Double Sculls

World Cup
Gold medal – first place	2011 Hamburg	Lightweight Double Sculls
Bronze medal – third place	2011 Munich	Lightweight Double Sculls
Bronze medal – third place	2011 Lucerne	Lightweight Double Sculls

Kristin Hedstrom (born May 14, 1986 in Boston, Massachusetts) is an American rower. Growing up in Concord, Massachusetts, she attended Concord-Carlisle High School until her graduation in 2004. She then attended the University of Wisconsin, where she graduated in 2008 with a degree in Business Management. She currently resides in Oakland, California where she was affiliated with the California Rowing Club. She is now a personal trainer who works one-on-one with rowers around the country.

== Rowing career ==
Hedstrom began rowing during her first year of high school on a club team called Community Rowing, Inc. She continued her rowing career at the University of Wisconsin, where she was a member of the lightweight eight that won gold in the 2006 and 2008 Intercollegiate Rowing Association Championship as well as gold in the 2006, 2007, and 2008 Eastern Sprints. She is a six-time USRowing national team member (2007–08, Under 23; 2009–12, Senior). After college, Hedstrom won gold in the lightweight double sculls and lightweight quadruple sculls at the 2009 USRowing National Championships, won the lightweight single sculls at the 2009 Head of the Charles Regatta, and won gold in the lightweight single sculls and lightweight double sculls at the 2010 USRowing National Championships. She competed in the lightweight double sculls at the 2012 Summer Olympics with team-mate Julie Nichols.
