= Yislena Hernández =

Cuban rower

Personal information
- Born: 13 March 1990 (age 36) Pinar del Río, Cuba

Sport
- Sport: Rowing
Medal record
Representing Cuba
Pan American Games
Silver medal – second place	2015 Toronto	Lightweight double sculls
Central American and Caribbean Games
Gold medal – first place	2014 Veracruz	Lightweight double sculls
Silver medal – second place	2018 Barranquilla	Lightweight double sculls

Yislena Hernández (born 13 March 1990) is a Cuban rower. She competed in the women's lightweight double sculls at the 2016 Summer Olympics.
