= Yoslaine Domínguez =

Cuban rower (born 1986)

Personal information
- Born: 11 April 1986 (age 40) Holguín, Cuba

Sport
- Sport: Rowing
Medal record
Representing Cuba
Pan American Games
Silver medal – second place	2011 Guadalajara	Lightweight double sculls

Yoslaine Domínguez (born 11 April 1986) is a Cuban rower. She competed in the women's lightweight double sculls event at the 2012 Summer Olympics.
