= Louise Ayling =

New Zealand rower

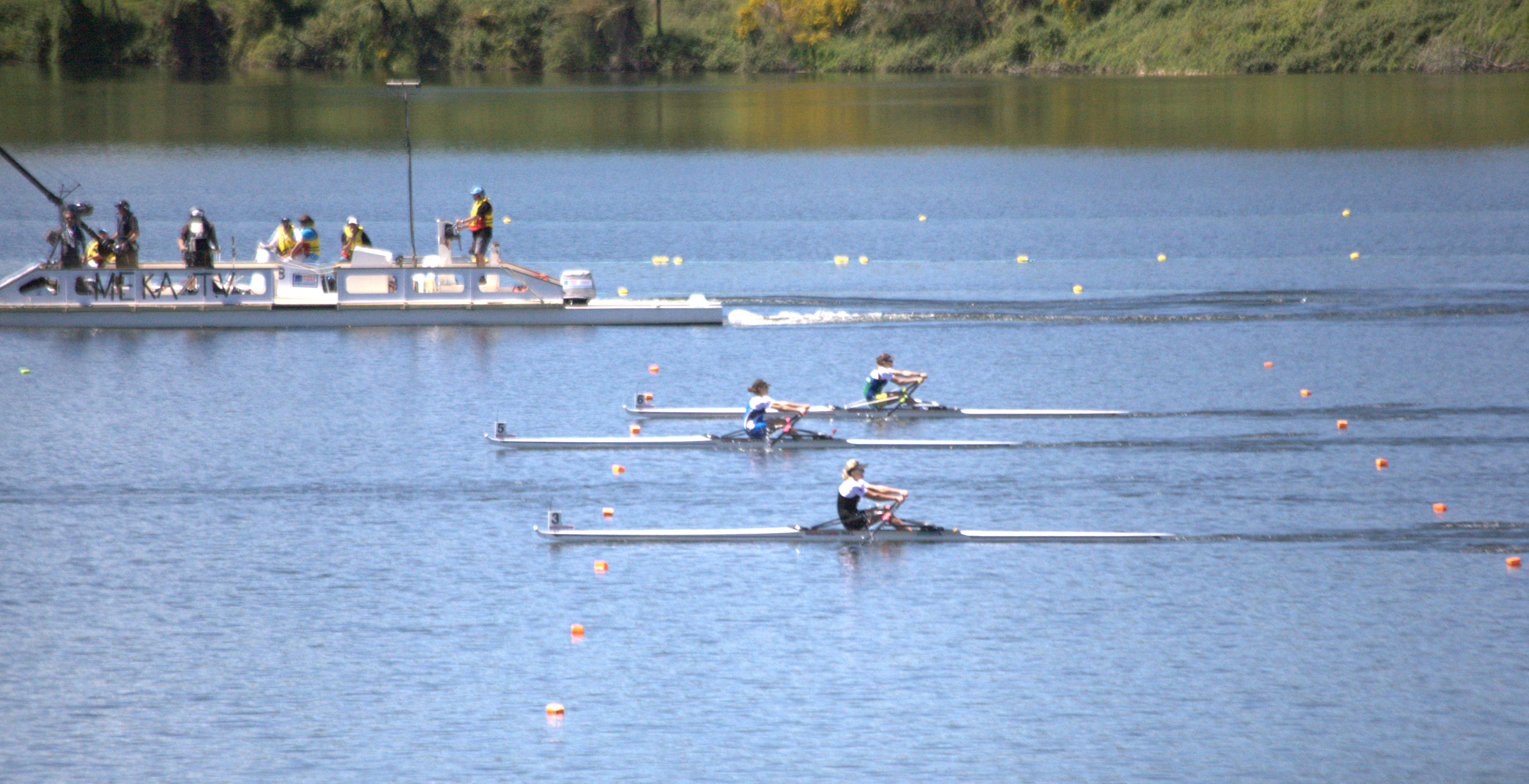
- Ayling (foreground) on her way to silver in 2010

Personal information
- Born: 23 October 1987 (age 38) Invercargill, New Zealand
Medal record
Women's rowing
Representing New Zealand
World Championships
Silver medal – second place	2010 Karapiro	LW1x

Louise Ayling (born 23 October 1987 in Invercargill) is a New Zealand rower. At the 2012 Summer Olympics, she competed in the women's lightweight double sculls with Julia Edward. She won the silver medal in the lightweight single sculls on home water at Karapiro at the 2010 World Championships and now teaches at Meadowbank School in Auckland Remuera.
