= Pan Feihong =

Chinese rower

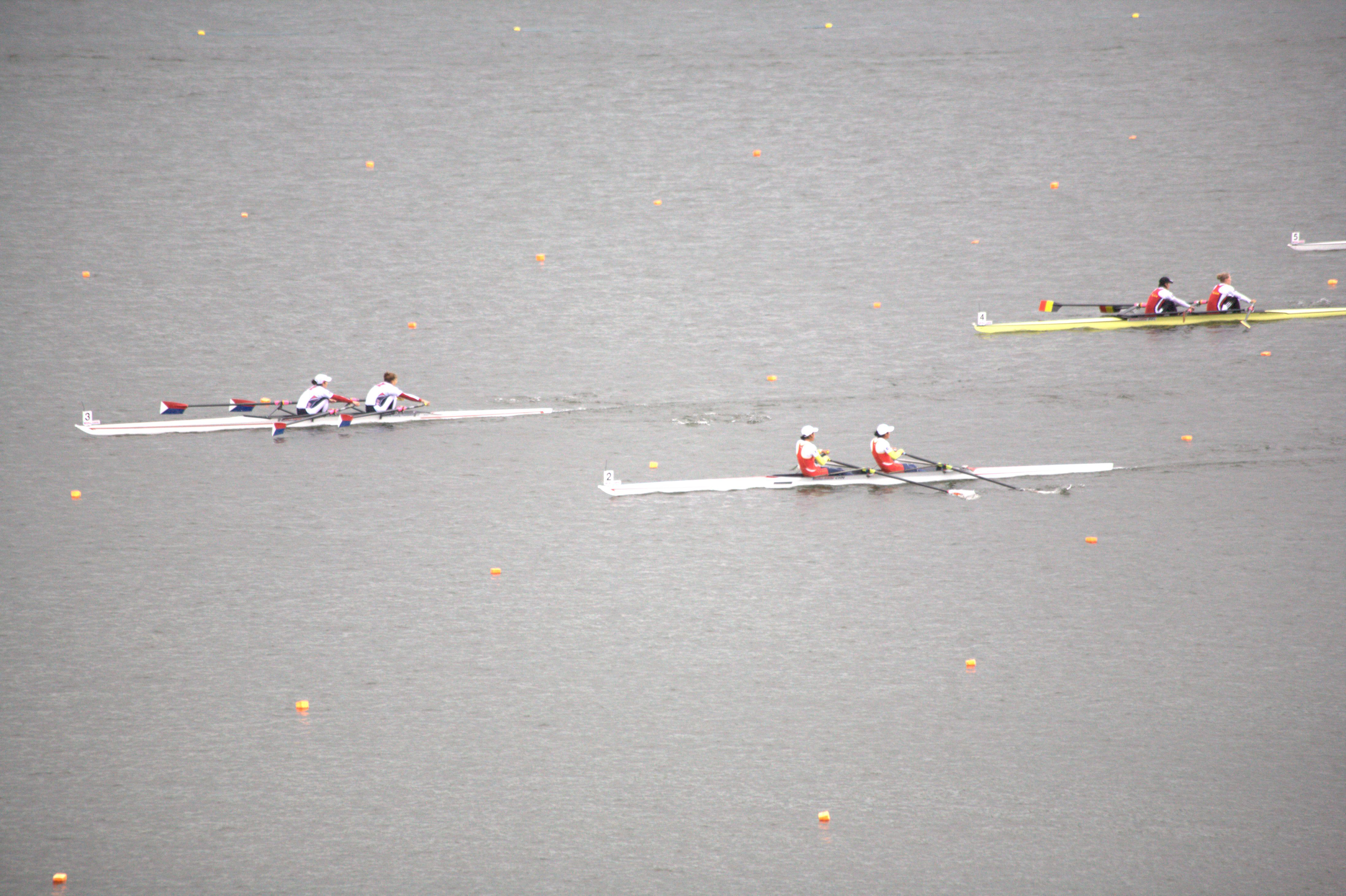
- Huang and Pan (foreground) on their way to winning the LW2x B final at the 2010 World Rowing Championships

Personal information
- Nationality: Chinese
- Born: 17 July 1989 (age 36)
- Height: 1.73 m (5 ft 8 in)
- Weight: 57 kg (126 lb)

Sport
- Country: China
- Sport: Rowing
Medal record
Women's rowing
Representing China
Olympic Games
Bronze medal – third place	2016 Rio de Janeiro	LW2x

Pan Feihong (Simplified Chinese:潘 飞鸿, born 17 July 1989) is a Chinese rower from Rui'an. She represented her country at the 2016 Summer Olympics, where she won the bronze medal in the lightweight double sculls event.
