= Laura Milani =

Italian rower

Personal information
- National team: Italy
- Born: 10 March 1984 (age 42) Milan, Italy

Sport
- Sport: Rowing
- Club: Fiamme Gialle
- Coached by: Ugo Lamberini
Medal record
Event	1st	2nd	3rd
World Championships	1	1	2
World U23 Championships	0	1	0
World Junior Championships	0	0	1
European Championships	3	0	3
Total	4	2	6
World Championships
Gold medal – first place	2013 Chungjiu	Lwt double scull
Silver medal – second place	2009 Poznań	Lwt single scull
Bronze medal – third place	2010 Karapiro	Lwt single scull
European Championships
Gold medal – first place	2014 Belgrade	Lwt double scull
Bronze medal – third place	2007 Poznań	Lwt double scull

Laura Milani (born 30 September 1984 in Milan) is an Italian rower.
