= Luana Bartholo =

Brazilian rower

Medal record

Women's rowing

Representing Brazil

Luana Bartholo de Assis (born 26 February 1985, in Rio de Janeiro) is a Brazilian rower. With Fabiana Beltrame, she competed in the women's lightweight double sculls at the 2012 Summer Olympics.
