= Lena Müller =

German rower

Medal record

Women's rowing

Representing Germany

World Championships
Gold medal – first place	2009 Poznań	LW4x
Gold medal – first place	2010 Karapiro	LW4x
Gold medal – first place	2015 Aiguebelette	LW4x
Bronze medal – third place	2011 Lake Bled	LW1x
Bronze medal – third place	2013 Chungjiu	LW2x

European Championships
Silver medal – second place	2014 Belgrade	LW2x

Lena Müller (born 16 June 1987 in Duisburg) is a German rower. At the 2012 Summer Olympics, she competed in the women's lightweight double sculls with Anja Noske.
