= Julia Edward =

New Zealand rower

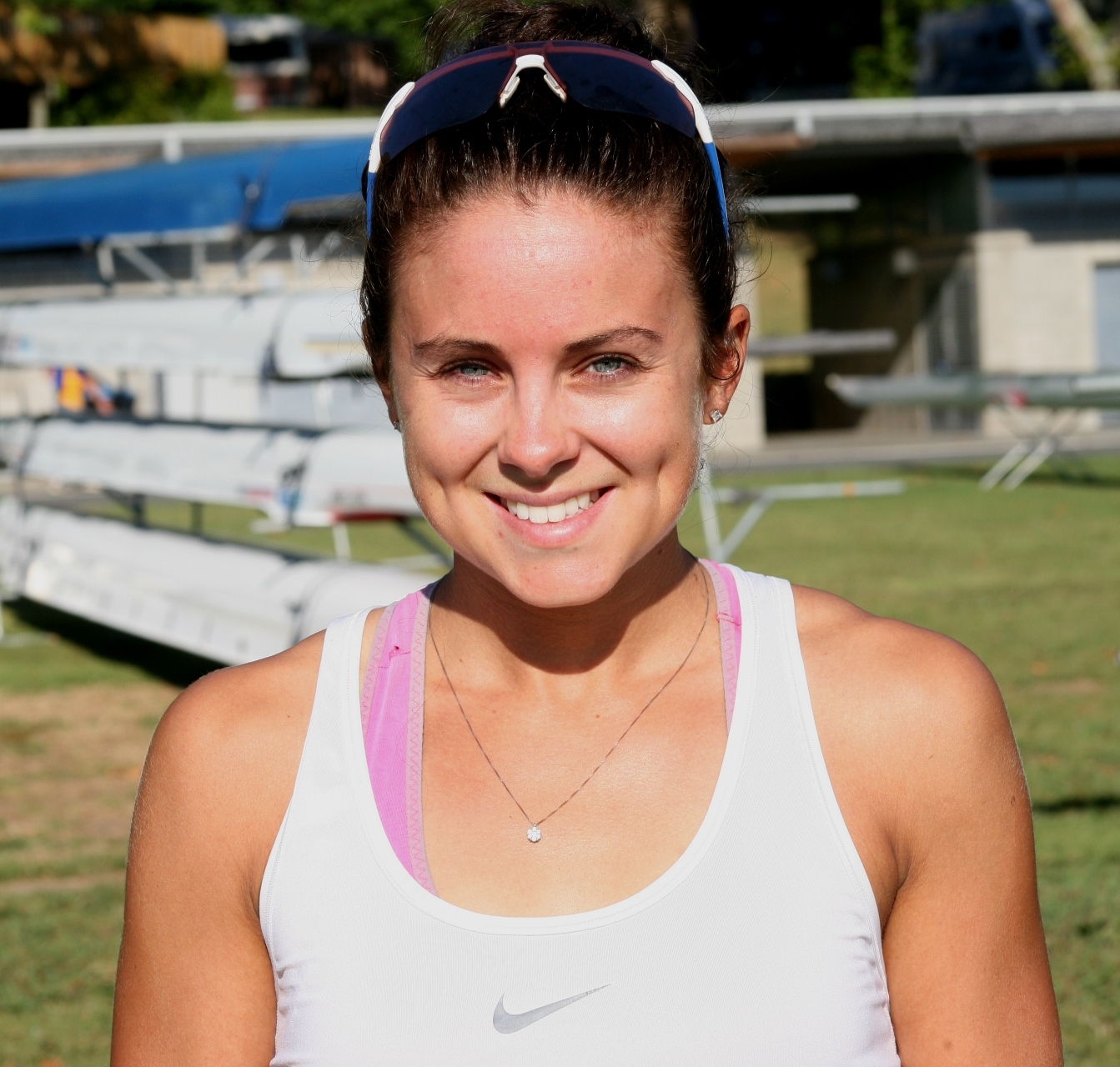
- Edward in 2013

Personal information
- Nationality: New Zealand
- Born: 20 February 1991 (age 35)
- Education: Rotorua Girls' High School
- Weight: 57 kg (126 lb)

Sport
- Club: Rotorua
Medal record
Women's rowing
Representing New Zealand
World Championships
Gold medal – first place	2014 Amsterdam	Lwt double scull
Gold medal – first place	2015 Aiguebelette	Lwt double scull
World U23 Championships
Silver medal – second place	2010 Brest	U23 lwt double scull
Bronze medal – third place	2011 Amsterdam	U23 lwt double scull

Julia Edward (born 20 February 1991) is a New Zealand rower, a two time world champion in the women's lightweight double sculls.

== Career ==
In 2010, she won silver in the lightweight double sculls at the U23 world championships with Lucy Strack. A year later, she won bronze in the same event with Alyce Pulford. She competed with Louise Ayling at the 2012 Summer Olympics.

Together with Sophie MacKenzie, she was world champion in the lightweight double scull for two years in a row; first at the 2014 World Rowing Championships in Amsterdam, and then at the 2015 World Rowing Championships in Aiguebelette.

The 2016 rowing year did not start out that successful for Edward and MacKenzie, and at both World Rowing Cups that New Zealand attended that year, they came third, beaten by different nations at those regattas. When they competed at the 2016 Summer Olympics in Rio de Janeiro later that year, they came fourth in the lightweight double sculls, which was disappointing to them. Some time after the Olympics, they both announced that they would take a year off rowing. Both will also take the 2018 rowing season off, but neither has announced their retirement.
