= Anja Noske =

German rower

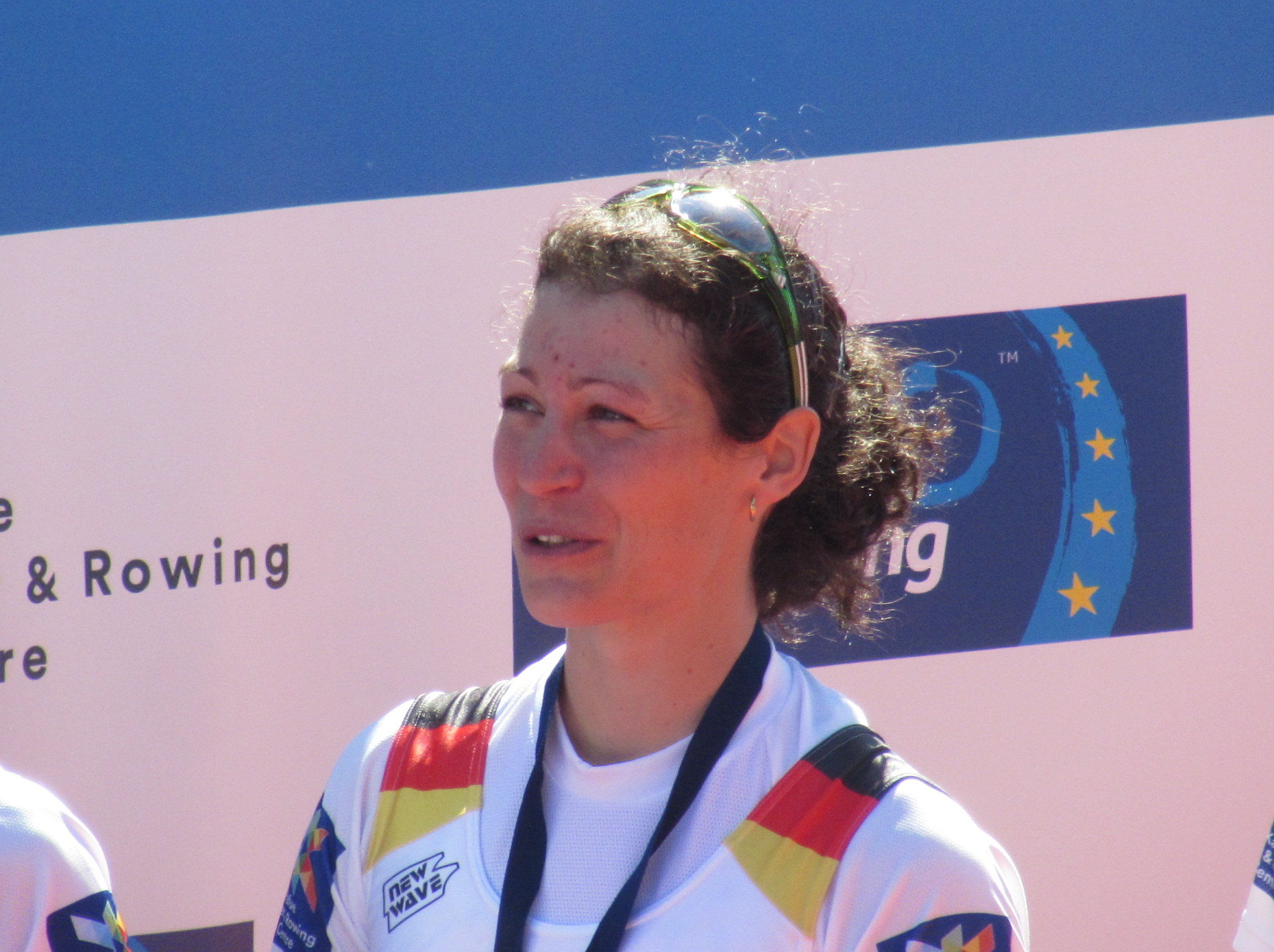

Personal information
- Born: 19 June 1986 (age 40) Lüneburg, West Germany

Sport
- Sport: Rowing
Medal record
Women's rowing
Representing Germany
World Championships
Gold medal – first place	2010 Karapiro	LW4x
Gold medal – first place	2015 Aiguebelette	LW4x
Silver medal – second place	2010 Karapiro	LW2x
Bronze medal – third place	2013 Chungjiu	LW2x
European Championships
Silver medal – second place	2014 Belgrade	LW2x

Anja Noske (born 10 June 1986) is a German rower. Twice world champion in the women's lightweight quadruple sculls, she competed in the women's lightweight double sculls at the 2012 Summer Olympics with Lena Müller.
