= Kathleen Bertko =

American rower

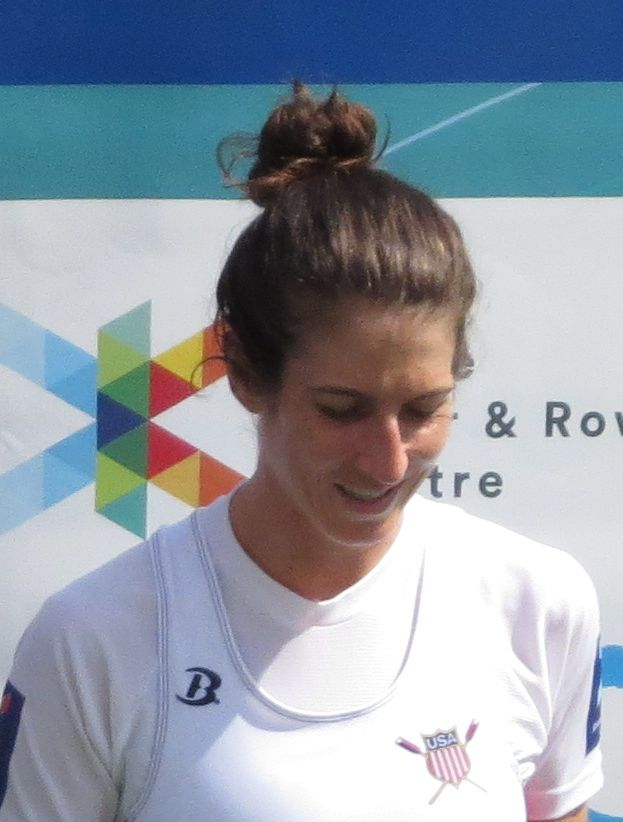
- Bertko in September 2015

Personal information
- Born: November 8, 1983 (age 42) Oakland, California, U.S.
Medal record
Women's rowing
Representing the United States
World Rowing Championships
Silver medal – second place	2009 Poznań	W4x
Silver medal – second place	2013 Chungjiu	LW2x
Bronze medal – third place	2014 Amsterdam	LW1x
Bronze medal – third place	2015 Aiguebelette	LW1x

Kathleen Bertko (born November 8, 1983) is an American Olympic rower. She won a total of four medals at the World Rowing Championships between 2009 and 2015.
