= Vanessa Cozzi =

Brazilian rower

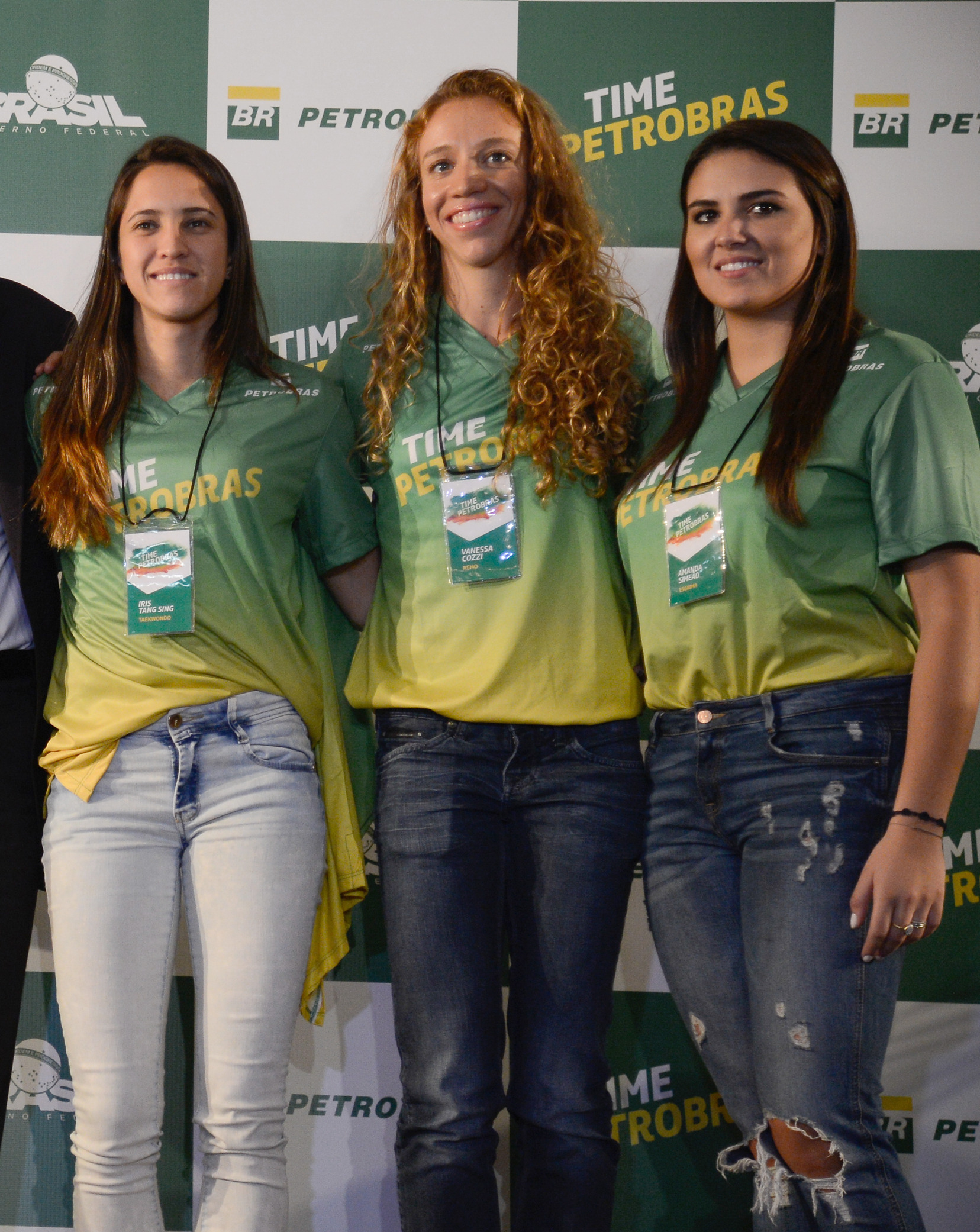
- Cozzi (center) in 2016

Personal information
- Born: 25 March 1984 (age 40); São Paulo, Brazil
- Height: 170 cm (5 ft 7 in)
- Weight: 57 kg (126 lb)

Sport
- Sport: Rowing
- Club: Pinheiros
- Coached by: Alexandre Nunes; Julio Soares

Vanessa Cozzi (born 25 March 1984) is a Brazilian rower. She competes in the lightweight double sculls at the 2016 Summer Olympics.
