= Cong Huanling =

Chinese rower

Personal information
- Nationality: Chinese
- Born: 12 May 1978 (age 47); Dalian, China

Sport
- Sport: Rowing

Cong Huanling (born 12 May 1978) is a Chinese rower. She competed in the women's coxless pair event at the 2004 Summer Olympics.
