= Lee Yuen Yin =

Hong Kong rower

Personal information
- Nationality: Hong Konger
- Born: 16 July 1989 (age 36)

Sport
- Sport: Rowing

Lee Yuen Yin (born 16 July 1989) is a Hong Kong female competitive rower.

She qualified to the 2016 Summer Olympics in Rio de Janeiro, and was selected to represent Hong Kong in the women's lightweight double sculls, together with Lee Ka Man.
