= Kim Sol-ji =

South Korean rower (born 1989)

Personal information
- Nationality: South Korean
- Born: 2 September 1989 (age 36) Seoul, South Korea

Sport
- Sport: Rowing

Kim Sol-ji (born 2 September 1989) is a South Korean rower. She competed in the women's lightweight double sculls event at the 2012 Summer Olympics.
