= Julie Nichols =

American rower

Personal information
- Nationality: American
- Born: April 21, 1978 (age 48) Walnut Creek, California

Sport
- Country: United States
- Sport: Rowing
- College team: California Golden Bears
Medal record
Women's rowing
Representing United States
World Rowing Championships
Silver medal – second place	2005 Gifu	LW2x
Bronze medal – third place	2004 Banyoles	LW4x
Pan American Games
Silver medal – second place	2007 Rio de Janeiro	Quadruple sculls

Julia Kathryn Nichols (born April 21, 1978) is an American rower. She competed in the lightweight double sculls at the 2012 Summer Olympics.
