= Kim Myung-shin (rower) =

South Korean rower (born 1984)

Personal information
- Nationality: South Korean
- Born: 10 August 1984 (age 40); Seoul, South Korea

Sport
- Sport: Rowing

Kim Myung-shin (born 10 August 1984) is a South Korean rower. She competed in the women's lightweight double sculls event at the 2012 Summer Olympics.
