= Sara Baraka =

Egyptian rower

Personal information
- Native name: سارة بركة
- Birth name: سارة أشرف محمد محمد بركة
- Full name: Sara Ashraf Mohamed Mohamed Baraka
- National team: Egypt
- Born: August 17, 1991 (age 33); Giza, Giza Governorate, Egypt

Sport
- Country: Egypt
- Sport: Rowing
- Updated on 27 July 2017

Sara Ashraf Mohamed Mohamed Baraka (Arabic: سارة أشرف محمد محمد بركة; born August 17, 1991, in Giza, Giza Governorate, Egypt) is an Egyptian Olympic rower. She represented Egypt in the 2012 Summer Olympics in London. She and teammate Ingy Hassamel Din qualified to compete in the women's lightweight double sculls by winning the event at the African Olympic Qualifier.

== Olympic participation ==
=== London 2012 ===
Rowing – Women's lightweight double sculls

Egypt Sara Baraka & Fatma Rashed
Round		Time	Rank	Result
Heats	Heat 1	7:45.23	6th	Qualify to Repêchage
Repêchages	Repêchage 1	7:54.01	6th	Qualify to Final C
Semifinals	Semifinal 3	DNQ		
Final Round	Final C	8:14.17	5th	
Final Standing: 17th
