= Nour El-Houda Ettaieb =

Tunisian rower (born 1996)

Personal information
- Born: October 15, 1996 (age 29)
- Height: 170 cm (5 ft 7 in)

Sport
- Country: Tunisia
- Sport: Rowing

Nour El-Houda Ettaieb (born 15 October 1996) is a Tunisian rower. She and Khadija Krimi placed 20th in the women's lightweight double sculls event at the 2016 Summer Olympics.

She qualified to represent Tunisia at the 2020 Summer Olympics.
