= Fatma Rashed =

Egyptian rower

Personal information
- Native name: فاطمة راشد
- Birth name: فاطمة محمد أحمد راشد
- Full name: Fatma Mohamed Ahmed Rashed
- National team: Egypt
- Born: July 19, 1984 (age 40); Moscow, Russian SFSR, Soviet Union (now Russia)

Sport
- Country: Egypt
- Sport: Rowing
- Updated on 28 July 2017

Fatma Mohamed Ahmed Rashed (Arabic: فاطمة محمد أحمد راشد; born July 19, 1984) is an Egyptian Olympic rower. She represented Egypt in 2012 Summer Olympics in London.

== Olympic Participation ==
=== London 2012 ===
Rowing – Women's lightweight double sculls

Egypt Sara Baraka & Fatma Rashed
Round		Time	Rank	Result
Heats	Heat 1	7:45.23	6th	Qualify to Repêchage
Repêchages	Repêchage 1	7:54.01	6th	Qualify to Final C
Semifinals	Semifinal 3	DNQ		
Final Round	Final C	8:14.17	5th	
Final Standing: 17th
