= Tracy Cameron =

Canadian rower

Tracy Stuart (nee Cameron)
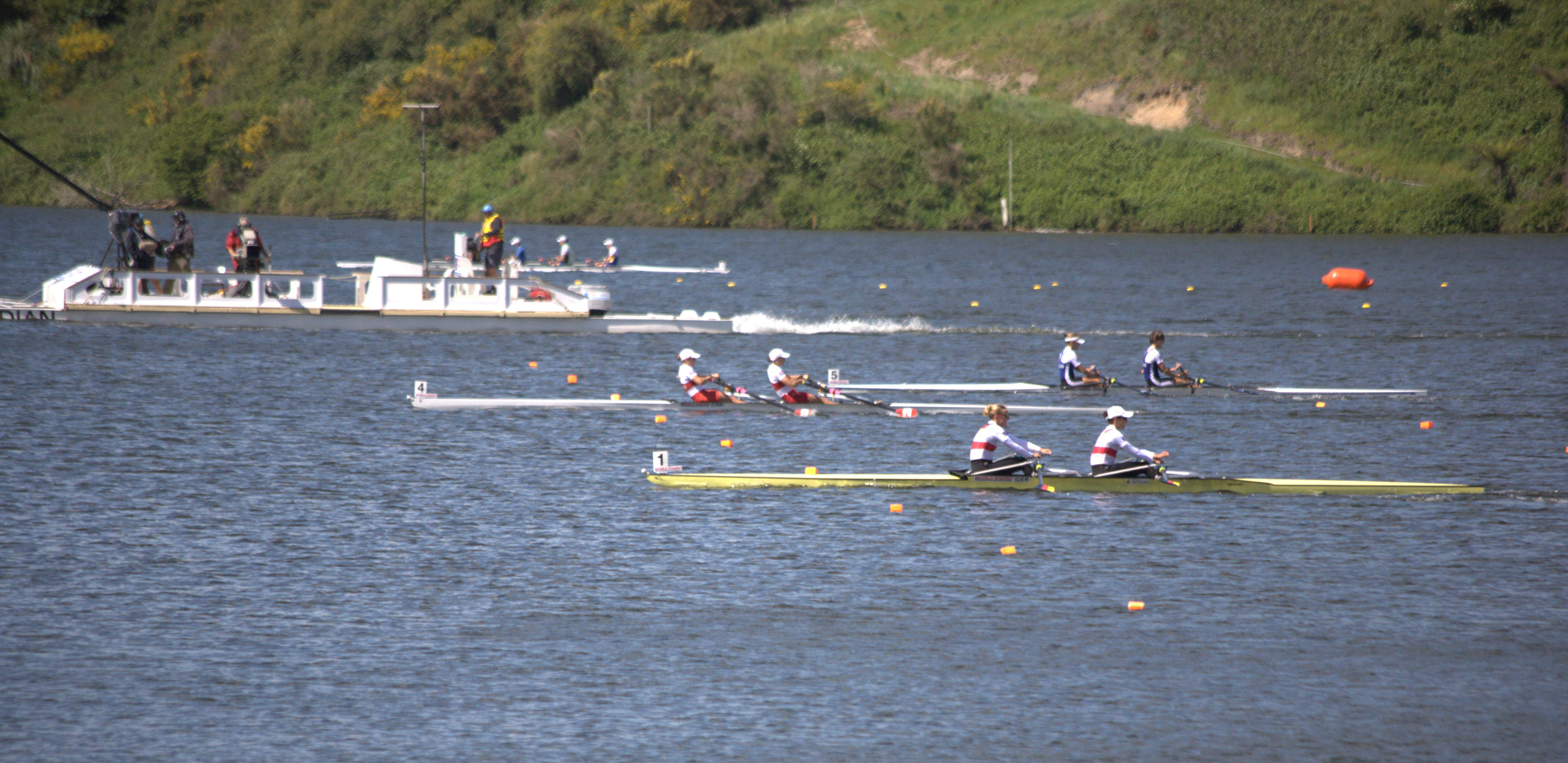
- Cameron and Jennerich (lane 4) on their way to win gold at the 2010 World Rowing Championships

Personal information
- Full name: Tracy Cameron
- Nationality: Canada
- Born: February 1, 1975 (age 51) Shubenacadie, Nova Scotia, Canada
- Height: 173 cm (5 ft 8 in)

Sport
- Club: Calgary Rowing Club
Medal record
Women's rowing
Representing Canada
2008 Summer Olympic Games
Bronze medal – third place	2008 Beijing	Lightweight Double Sculls (LW2x)
World Rowing Championships
Gold medal – first place	2005 Gifu	Lightweight Quadruple Sculls (-LW4x)
Gold medal – first place	2010 Lake Karapiro	Lightweight Double Sculls

Tracy Stuart (née Cameron) (born February 1, 1975) is a Canadian rower. She began rowing in 2000 at the age of 25 by enrolling in the learn to row program, while attending the University of Calgary. Since then, Tracy has been to the starting line 12 times and brought home 9 medals, including a Bronze in the Beijing 2008 Summer Olympics and a gold in the 2010 World Rowing Championships.

== Biography ==
Cameron has won two World Rowing Championships medals, a gold in 2005 in the Lightweight Quadruple Sculls with Melanie Kok, Mara Jones and Elizabeth Urbach and a gold in 2010 in the Lightweight Double Sculls with Lindsay Jennerich. She competed at the Beijing 2008 Summer Olympics in the women's lightweight doubles with partner Melanie Kok and won a bronze medal.

== Accomplishments ==
2010 - 1st in LW2x, World Rowing Championships, Lake Karapiro, New Zealand

2008 - 3rd in LW2x Beijing Olympics, Beijing, China

2008 - 1st in LW2x, World Cup, Poznan, Poland

2008 - 3rd in LW2x, World Cup, Lucerne, Switzerland

2007 - 2nd in LW2x World Cup, Lucerne, Switzerland

2007 - 3rd in LW2x World Cup 1 Linz, Austria

2006 - 1st in LW2x World Cup 3 Lucerne, Switzerland

2006 - 1st in LW1x World Cup 1 Munich, Germany

2005 - 1st in LW4x World Championships Gifu, Japan LW4x

== Education ==
Functional Medicine Coaching Academy '2022

Functional Medicine Certified Health Coach (FMCHC)

Natural Gourmet Institute for Health and Culinary Arts '2009

Chef Training Diploma

University of Calgary '2000

Master of Science (MSc) in Sport Medicine

Acadia University '1998

Bachelor of Physical Education
Honours in Exercise Studies
