= Zarrina Mihaylova =

Uzbekistani rower (born 1982)

Personal information
- Born: 29 November 1982 (age 43)
Medal record
Representing Uzbekistan
Women's rowing
Asian Games
Gold medal – first place	2006 Doha	LW2x
Bronze medal – third place	2002 Busan	W4-
Bronze medal – third place	2010 Guangzhou	W1x

Zarrina Mihaylova (née Ganieva, born 29 November 1982 in Bekabad) is an Uzbekistani rower.
