= Atsumi Fukumoto =

Japanese rower (born 1988)

Personal information
- Nationality: Japanese
- Born: 24 July 1988 (age 37) Karatsu, Japan

Sport
- Sport: Rowing

Atsumi Fukumoto (福本 温子, Fukumoto Atsumi; born 24 July 1988) is a Japanese rower. She competed in the women's lightweight double sculls event at the 2012 Summer Olympics.
