= Huang Wenyi =

Chinese rower (born 1991)

Medal record

Women's rowing

Representing China

Olympic Games
Silver medal – second place	2012 London	LW2x
Bronze medal – third place	2016 Rio de Janeiro	LW2x

World Championships
Bronze medal – third place	2014 Amsterdam	LW2x

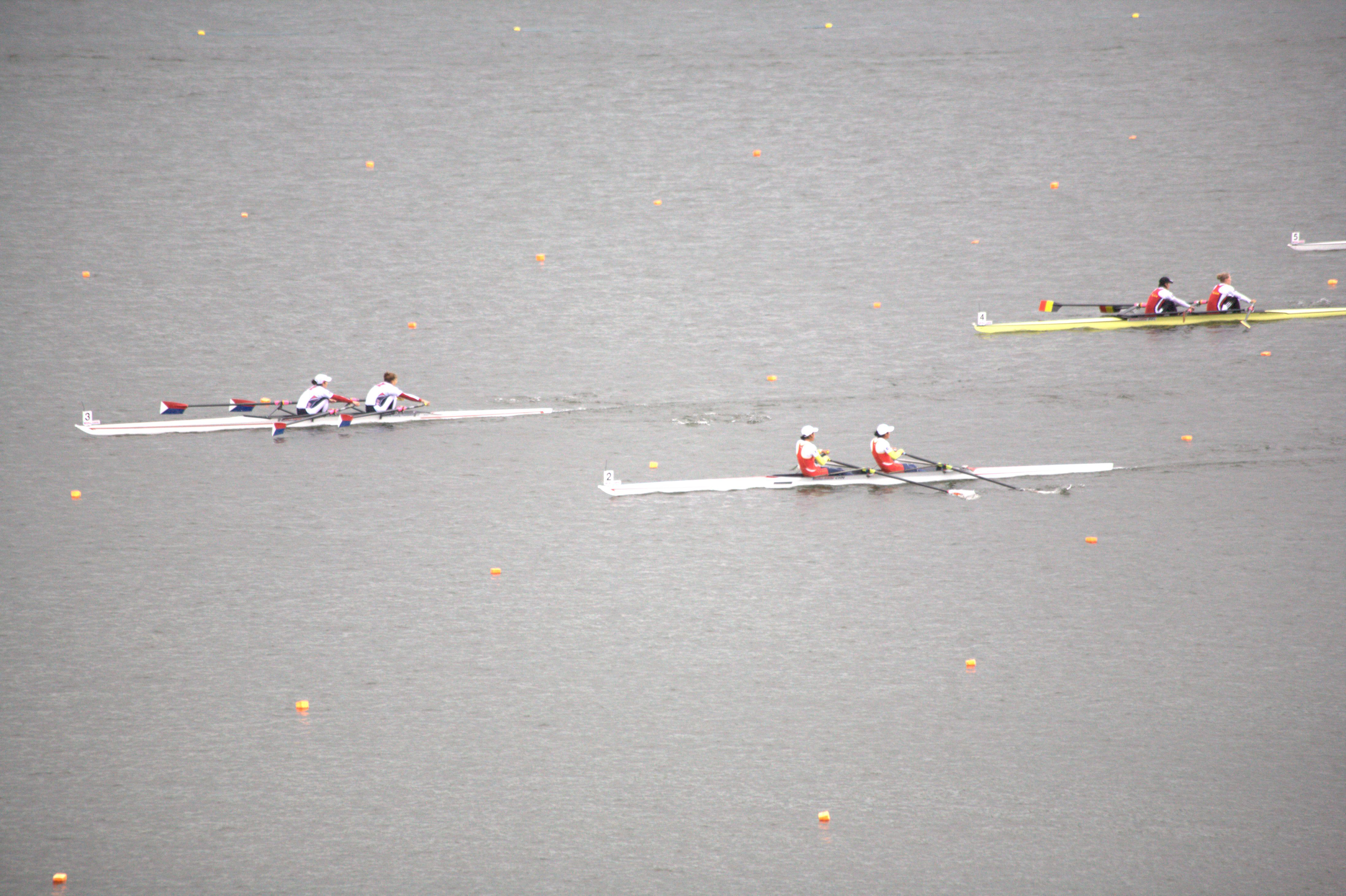
Huang and Pan (foreground) on their way to winning the LW2x B final at the 2010 World Rowing Championships

Huang Wenyi (Chinese: 黄文仪; pinyin: Huáng Wényí; born 6 March 1991) is a female Chinese rower. She is a World and Olympic medallist.

== Career ==
Huang began to row at the age of 12. Her mother had been a basketball player.

At the 2012 Summer Olympics, she and Xu Dongxiang won the silver medal in the women's lightweight double sculls. Two years later, the team of Huang and Pan Dandan won the bronze medal at the 2014 World Championship, again in the women's lightweight double sculls. Huang won her second Olympic medal in 2016, winning women's lightweight double sculls bronze with Pan Feihong.
