= Licet Hernández =

Cuban rower (born 1993)

Personal information
- Born: 14 April 1993 (age 33) Pilón, Cuba
- Height: 5 ft 6 in (168 cm)
- Weight: 126 lb (57 kg)

Sport
- Country: Cuba
- Sport: Rowing
Medal record
Representing Cuba
Pan American Games
Silver medal – second place	2015 Toronto	Lightweight double sculls
Central American and Caribbean Games
Gold medal – first place	2014 Veracruz	Lightweight double sculls

Licet Hernández (born 14 April 1993) is a Cuban rower. She competed in the women's lightweight double sculls event at the 2016 Summer Olympics.

She was also scheduled to compete in the 2017 World Rowing Championships in Sarasota, Florida but never appeared at her scheduled competition. The Sarasota County Sheriff's Office reported her as a missing person since her disappearance.
