= María Clara Rohner =

Argentine rower (born 1985)

Personal information
- Born: 1 April 1985 (age 41) Rosario, Santa Fe, Argentina

Sport
- Sport: Rowing
Medal record
Representing Argentina
Pan American Games
Gold medal – first place	2011 Guadalajara	Quadruple sculls
Bronze medal – third place	2015 Toronto	Quadruple sculls

María Clara Rohner (born 1 April 1985) is an Argentine rower. She competed in the women's lightweight double sculls event at the 2012 Summer Olympics.
