= Yariulvis Cobas =

Cuban rower (born 1990)

Personal information
- Born: 18 August 1990 (age 35) Guantánamo, Cuba

Sport
- Sport: Rowing
Medal record
Women's rowing
Representing Cuba
Pan American Games
Gold medal – first place	2011 Guadalajara	Double sculls
Gold medal – first place	2019 Lima	Double sculls
Silver medal – second place	2019 Lima	Quadruple sculls
Bronze medal – third place	2015 Toronto	Double sculls

Yariulvis Cobas García (born 18 August 1990) is a Cuban female rower who has represented her country in international competitions. She competed in the single sculls race at the 2012 Summer Olympics and placed 3rd in Final C and 15th overall.
