= Milka Kraljev =

Argentine rower (born 1982)

Personal information
- Born: 8 November 1982 (age 43) Tigre, Buenos Aires, Argentina

Sport
- Sport: Rowing
Medal record
Women's rowing
Representing Argentina
Pan American Games
Silver medal – second place	2019 Lima	Lightweight single sculls
Bronze medal – third place	2019 Lima	Double sculls

Milka Kraljev (born 8 November 1982) is an Argentine rower. She competed at the 2004 Summer Olympics and the 2012 Summer Olympics. She also competed at the 2020 Summer Olympics.
