= Rowing at the 2004 Summer Olympics – Men's lightweight coxless four =

Men's lightweight coxless four at the Games of the XXVIII Olympiad
- Competitors: 52 from 13 nations

Medalists
1st place, gold medalist(s)		Thor Kristensen; Thomas Ebert; Stephan Mølvig; Eskild Ebbesen	Denmark
2nd place, silver medalist(s)		Glen Loftus; Anthony Edwards; Ben Cureton; Simon Burgess	Australia
3rd place, bronze medalist(s)		Lorenzo Bertini; Catello Amarante; Salvatore Amitrano; Bruno Mascarenhas	Italy

Men's lightweight coxless four was an event in Rowing at the 2004 Summer Olympics in Athens, Greece. The team from Denmark won the event. Four men were in each boat. The Rowing events were held at the Schinias Olympic Rowing and Canoeing Centre.

== Medalists ==
Gold:	Silver:	Bronze:
Denmark; Thor Kristensen; Thomas Ebert; Stephan Mølvig; Eskild Ebbesen	Australia; Glen Loftus; Anthony Edwards; Ben Cureton; Simon Burgess	Italy; Lorenzo Bertini; Catello Amarante; Salvatore Amitrano; Bruno Mascarenhas

== Heats – 15 August ==
- SF denotes qualification to semifinal
- R denotes qualification to repechage

=== Heat 1 ===
Rank	Country	Athletes	Time	Notes
1	Canada	Iain Brambell, Jonathan Mandick, Gavin Hassett, Jon Beare	5:51.18	SF
2	Netherlands	Gerard van der Linden, Ivo Snijders, Karel Dormans, Joeri de Groot	5:52.52	SF
3	Austria	Juliusz Madecki, Sebastian Sageder, Bernd Wakolbinger, Wolfgang Sigl	5:54.07	SF
4	Serbia and Montenegro	Veljko Urošević, Nenad Babović, Goran Nedeljković, Miloš Tomić	5:56.12	R
5	Spain	Mario Arranz, Jesús González, Carlos Loriente, Alberto Domínguez	6:11.70	R

=== Heat 2 ===
Rank	Country	Athletes	Time	Notes
1	Denmark	Thor Kristensen, Thomas Ebert, Stephan Mølvig, Eskild Ebbesen	5:50.72	SF
2	Italy	Lorenzo Bertini, Catello Amarante, Salvatore Amitrano, Bruno Mascarenhas	5:52.17	SF
3	Germany	Martin Müller-Falcke, Axel Schuster, Stefan Locher, Andreas Bech	5:52.68	SF
4	Great Britain	Mike Hennessy, Tim Male, Nick English, Mark Hunter	6:05.57	R

=== Heat 3 ===
Rank	Country	Athletes	Time	Notes
1	Australia	Glen Loftus, Anthony Edwards, Ben Cureton, Simon Burgess	5:50.24	SF
2	Ireland	Richard Archibald, Eugene Coakley, Niall O'Toole, Paul Griffin	5:52.54	SF
3	United States	Pat Todd, Matt Smith, Paul Teti, Steve Warner	5:54.68	SF
4	Russia	Sergej Burkeev, Valery Sarychev, Aleksandr Savin, Aleksandr Zyuzin	5:55.67	R

== Repechage – 17 August ==
1. Russia: Sergej Burkeev, Valerij Saritchev, Aleksandr Savkin, Aleksandr Zyuzin, 5:52.87 -> Semifinal A/B
2. Serbia and Montenegro: Veljko Urošević, Nenad Babović, Goran Nedeljković, Miloš Tomić, 5:54.27 -> Semifinal A/B
3. Spain: Mario Arranz Puente, Jesus Gonzalez Alvarez, Carlos Loriente Perez, Alberto Dominguez Lorenzo, 5:56.15 -> Semifinal A/B
4. Great Britain: Mike Hennessy, Tim Male, Nick English, Mark Hunter, 5:58.80

== Semifinals – 19 August ==
=== Semifinal A ===
1. Italy: Lorenzo Bertini, Catello Amarante, Salvatore Amitrano, Bruno Mascarenhas, 5:55.02 -> Final A
2. Australia: Glen Loftus, Anthony Edwards, Ben Cureton, Simon Burgess, 5:55.22 -> Final A
3. Canada: Iain Brambell, Jonathan Mandick, Gavin Hassett, Jon Beare, 5:57.44 -> Final A
4. Austria: Juliusz Madecki, Sebastian Sageder, Bernd Wakolbinger, Wolfgang Sigl, 5:58.73 -> Final B
5. Serbia and Montenegro: Veljko Urošević, Nenad Babović, Goran Nedeljković, Miloš Tomić, 6:00.07 -> Final B
6. United States: Pat Todd, Matt Smith, Paul Teti, Steve Warner, 6:01.84 -> Final B

=== Semifinal B ===
1. Denmark: Thor Kristensen, Thomas Ebert, Stephan Mølvig, Eskild Ebbesen, 5:55.85 -> Final A
2. Netherlands: Gerard van der Linden, Ivo Snijders, Karel Dormans, Joeri de Groot, 5:57.47 -> Final A
3. Ireland: Richard Archibald, Eugene Coakley, Niall O'Toole, Paul Griffin, 5:58.89 -> Final A
4. Russia: Sergej Burkeev, Valerij Saritchev, Aleksandr Savkin, Aleksandr Zyuzin, 5:59.75 -> Final B
5. Germany: Martin Müller-Falcke, Axel Schuster, Stefan Locher, Andreas Bech, 6:03.08 -> Final B
6. Spain: Mario Arranz Puente, Jesus Gonzalez Alvarez, Carlos Loriente Perez, Alberto Dominguez Lorenzo, 6:07.01 -> Final B

== Finals ==
=== Final A – 22 August ===
1. Denmark: Thor Kristensen, Thomas Ebert, Stephan Mølvig, Eskild Ebbesen, 5:56.85
2. Australia: Glen Loftus, Anthony Edwards, Ben Cureton, Simon Burgess, 5:57.43
3. Italy: Lorenzo Bertini, Catello Amarante, Salvatore Amitrano, Bruno Mascarenhas, 5:58.87
4. Netherlands: Gerard van der Linden, Ivo Snijders, Karel Dormans, Joeri de Groot, 5:58.94
5. Canada: Iain Brambell, Jonathan Mandick, Gavin Hassett, Jon Beare, 6:07.04
6. Ireland: Richard Archibald, Eugene Coakley, Niall O'Toole, Paul Griffin, 6:09.33

=== Final B – 21 August ===
1. Serbia and Montenegro: Veljko Urošević, Nenad Babović, Goran Nedeljković, Miloš Tomić, 6:19.00
2. Russia: Sergej Burkeev, Valerij Saritchev, Aleksandr Savkin, Aleksandr Zyuzin, 6:20.64
3. United States: Pat Todd, Matt Smith, Paul Teti, Steve Warner, 6:22.24
4. Austria: Juliusz Madecki, Sebastian Sageder, Bernd Wakolbinger, Wolfgang Sigl, 6:22.85
5. Germany: Martin Mueller-Fackle, Axel Schuster, Stefan Locher, Andreas Bech, 6:23.28
6. Spain: Mario Arranz Puente, Jesus Gonzalez Alvarez, Carlos Loriente Perez, Alberto Dominguez Lorenzo, 6:26.15
