= Spain at the 2004 Summer Olympics =

- IOC code: ESP
- NOC: Spanish Olympic Committee
- Website: www.coe.es (in Spanish)

in Athens
- Competitors: 317 in 26 sports
- Flag bearers: Isabel Fernández (opening); David Cal (closing)
- Medals Ranked 20th: Gold 3 Silver 11 Bronze 6 Total 20

Summer Olympics appearances (overview)
- 1900; 1904–1912; 1920; 1924; 1928; 1932; 1936; 1948; 1952; 1956; 1960; 1964; 1968; 1972; 1976; 1980; 1984; 1988; 1992; 1996; 2000; 2004; 2008; 2012; 2016; 2020; 2024; 2028

Spain competed at the 2004 Summer Olympics in Athens, Greece, from August 13 to 29, 2004. This nation has competed in every Summer Olympic Games since its official debut in 1920. Spain, however, boycotted two editions, the 1936 Summer Olympics in Nazi Germany, and the 1956 Summer Olympics in Melbourne when it joined the Dutch-led boycott, as a protest to the Soviet invasion of Hungary. The Spanish Olympic Committee sent the nation's third largest delegation in history to the Games. A total of 317 athletes, 177 men and 140 women, competed in 26 sports.

== Medalists ==
Medal	Name	Sport	Event	Date
Gold	Gervasio Deferr	Gymnastics	Men's vault	August 23
Gold	Xabier Fernández; Iker Martínez	Sailing	49er class	August 26
Gold	David Cal	Canoeing	Men's C-1 1000 m	August 27
Silver	María Quintanal	Shooting	Women's trap	August 16
Silver	Paquillo Fernández	Athletics	Men's 20 km walk	August 20
Silver	Beatriz Ferrer-Salat; Juan Antonio Jimenez; Ignacio Rambla; Rafael Soto	Equestrian	Team dressage	August 21
Silver	Rafael Trujillo	Sailing	Finn class	August 21
Silver	Sandra Azón; Natalia Vía Dufresne	Sailing	Women's 470 class	August 21
Silver	Conchita Martínez; Virginia Ruano Pascual	Tennis	Women's doubles	August 22
Silver	Joan Llaneras	Cycling	Men's points race	August 24
Silver	José Antonio Escuredo	Cycling	Men's keirin	August 25
Silver	Javier Bosma; Pablo Herrera	Volleyball	Men's beach volleyball	August 25
Silver	David Cal	Canoeing	Men's C-1 500 m	August 28
Silver	José Antonio Hermida	Cycling	Men's cross-country	August 28
Bronze	Manuel Martínez Gutiérrez	Athletics	Men's shot put	August 18
Bronze	Sergi Escobar	Cycling	Men's individual pursuit	August 21
Bronze	Carlos Castaño; Sergi Escobar; Asier Maeztu; Carlos Torrent	Cycling	Men's team pursuit	August 23
Bronze	Patricia Moreno	Gymnastics	Women's floor	August 23
Bronze	Beatriz Ferrer-Salat	Equestrian	Individual dressage	August 25
Bronze	Joan Lino Martínez	Athletics	Men's long jump	August 26

Medals by sport
Sport	1st place, gold medalist(s)	2nd place, silver medalist(s)	3rd place, bronze medalist(s)	Total
Sailing	1	2	0	3
Canoeing	1	1	0	2
Gymnastics	1	0	1	2
Cycling	0	3	2	5
Athletics	0	1	2	3
Tennis	0	1	0	1
Equestrian	0	1	1	2
Shooting	0	1	0	1
Volleyball	0	1	0	1
Total	3	11	6	20

== Delegation ==
The following is the list of number of competitors participating in the Games. Note that reserves for fencing, field hockey, football, and handball are not counted as athletes:

Sport	Men	Women	Total
Archery	1	1	2
Athletics	34	23	57
Badminton	2	0	2
Basketball	12	12	24
Canoeing	10	4	14
Cycling	17	5	22
Diving	1	3	4
Equestrian	3	1	4
Fencing	1	0	1
Field hockey	16	16	32
Gymnastics	6	13	19
Handball	15	15	30
Judo	6	4	10
Rowing	6	3	9
Sailing	11	7	18
Shooting	2	2	4
Swimming	6	10	16
Synchronized swimming	—N/a	9	9
Table tennis	1	0	1
Taekwondo	2	2	4
Tennis	5	5	10
Triathlon	3	3	6
Volleyball	2	0	2
Water polo	13	0	13
Weightlifting	1	1	2
Wrestling	2	0	2
Total	178	139	317

== Archery ==
Two Spanish archers qualified each for the men's and women's individual archery.

Athlete	Event	Ranking round		Round of 64	Round of 32	Round of 16	Quarterfinals	Semifinals	Final / BM	
Athlete	Event	Score	Seed	Opposition Score	Opposition Score	Opposition Score	Opposition Score	Opposition Score	Opposition Score	Rank
Felipe López	Men's individual	641	40	Serdyuk (UKR); L 141–164	Did not advance					
Almudena Gallardo	Women's individual	631	24	Narimanidze (GEO); W 148–132	Figueroa (PHI); W 152–150	Psarra (GRE); L 152–160	Did not advance			

== Athletics ==
Spanish athletes have so far achieved qualifying standards in the following athletics events (up to a maximum of 3 athletes in each event at the 'A' Standard, and 1 at the 'B' Standard).

Key

- Note–Ranks given for track events are within the athlete's heat only
- Q = Qualified for the next round
- q = Qualified for the next round as a fastest loser or, in field events, by position without achieving the qualifying target
- NR = National record
- N/A = Round not applicable for the event
- Bye = Athlete not required to compete in round

Men
Track & road events

Athlete	Event	Heat		Quarterfinal		Semifinal		Final	
Athlete	Event	Result	Rank	Result	Rank	Result	Rank	Result	Rank
David Canal	200 m	20.72	3 Q	21.18	7	Did not advance			
David Canal	400 m	47.23	7	—N/a		Did not advance			
Manuel Olmedo	800 m	1:47.71	4	—N/a		Did not advance			
Miguel Quesada	800 m	1:46.32	3	—N/a		Did not advance			
Antonio Manuel Reina	800 m	1:46.66	=1 Q	—N/a		1:46.17	3	Did not advance	
Reyes Estévez	1500 m	3:39.71	1 Q	—N/a		3:36.05	4 Q	3:36.63	7
Álvaro Fernández	1500 m	3:38.34	3 Q	—N/a		3:42.01	7	Did not advance	
Juan Carlos Higuero	1500 m	3:38.36	6 q	—N/a		3:42.13	8	Did not advance	
Carles Castillejo	5000 m	13:49.16	16	—N/a				Did not advance	
Carlos García	5000 m	DNF		—N/a				Did not advance	
Roberto García	5000 m	13:27.72	9	—N/a				Did not advance	
José Manuel Martínez	10000 m	—N/a						27:57.61	9
Felipe Vivancos	110 m hurdles	13.47	6 q	13.48	4 q	13.52	7	Did not advance	
Eduardo Iván Rodríguez	400 m hurdles	49.25	4 Q	—N/a		49.77	6	Did not advance	
Antonio David Jiménez	3000 m steeplechase	8:24.13	2 Q	—N/a				8:22.63	14
Eliseo Martín	3000 m steeplechase	8:21.88	6 q	—N/a				8:15.77	9
Luis Miguel Martín	3000 m steeplechase	8:16.90	3 Q	—N/a				8:11.64	5
Antoni Peña	Marathon	—N/a						2:16:38	18
Julio Rey	Marathon	—N/a						2:24:54	58
José Rios	Marathon	—N/a						2:18:40	27
José David Dominguez	20 km walk	—N/a						1:30:16	37
Paquillo Fernández	20 km walk	—N/a						1:19:45	2nd place, silver medalist(s)
Juan Manuel Molina	20 km walk	—N/a						1:20:55	5
Jesús Angel García	50 km walk	—N/a						3:44:42	5
José Antonio González	50 km walk	—N/a						4:11:51	33
Santiago Pérez	50 km walk	—N/a						3:49:48	8
David Canal; Luis Flores; Antonio Manuel Reina; Eduardo Iván Rodríguez	4 × 400 m relay	3:05.03	7	—N/a				Did not advance	

Field events

Athlete	Event	Qualification		Final	
Athlete	Event	Distance	Position	Distance	Position
Javier Bermejo	High jump	2.15	=31	Did not advance	
Javier Gazol	Pole vault	5.30	=28	Did not advance	
Yago Lamela	Long jump	8.06	10 q	7.98	11
Joan Lino Martínez	Long jump	8.10	6 Q	8.32	3rd place, bronze medalist(s)
Manuel Martínez	Shot put	20.37	6 q	20.84	3rd place, bronze medalist(s)
Mario Pestano	Discus throw	61.69	13	Did not advance	

Combined events – Decathlon

Athlete	Event	100 m	LJ	SP	HJ	400 m	110H	DT	PV	JT	1500 m	Final	Rank
David Gómez	Result	11.08	7.26	14.57	1.85	48.61	14.41	40.95	4.40	60.71	4:29.70	7865	22
David Gómez	Points	843	876	763	670	880	922	684	731	749	747	7865	22

Women
Track & road events

Athlete	Event	Heat		Semifinal		Final	
Athlete	Event	Result	Rank	Result	Rank	Result	Rank
Mayte Martínez	800 m	2:00.81	2 Q	2:03.30	8	Did not advance	
Iris Fuentes-Pila	1500 m	4:06.32	7 q	4:07.69	10	Did not advance	
Nuria Fernández	1500 m	4:06.29	3 Q	4:07.68	9	Did not advance	
Natalia Rodriguez	1500 m	4:07.19	7 q	4:04.91	4 Q	4:03.01	10
Glory Alozie	100 m hurdles	12.92	2 Q	12.62	7	Did not advance	
Aliuska López	100 m hurdles	13.21	4	Did not advance			
Cora Olivero	400 m hurdles	56.19	5	Did not advance			
María Abel	Marathon	—N/a				2:40:13	26
María Dolores Pulido	Marathon	—N/a				2:44:33	37
Beatriz Ros	Marathon	—N/a				2:41:51	32
Rocio Florido	20 km walk	—N/a				1:35:32	30
María Teresa Gargallo	20 km walk	—N/a				DSQ	
María Vasco	20 km walk	—N/a				1:30:06	7

Field events

Athlete	Event	Qualification		Final	
Athlete	Event	Distance	Position	Distance	Position
Niurka Montalvo	Long jump	NM	—	Did not advance	
Carlota Castrejana	Triple jump	14.37	18	Did not advance	
Naroa Agirre	Pole vault	4.40	=8 q	4.40	6
Dana Cervantes	Pole vault	4.40	=4 q	NM	—
Ruth Beitía	High jump	1.89	=16	Did not advance	
Marta Mendía	High jump	1.92	11 q	1.93	10
Irache Quintanal	Shot put	15.99	29	Did not advance	
Alice Matejková	Discus throw	55.37	35	Did not advance	
Mercedes Chilla	Javelin throw	58.45	22	Did not advance	
Berta Castells	Hammer throw	66.05	23	Did not advance	

== Badminton ==
Athlete	Event	Round of 32	Round of 16	Quarterfinal	Semifinal	Final / BM	
Athlete	Event	Opposition Score	Opposition Score	Opposition Score	Opposition Score	Opposition Score	Rank
Sergio Llopis	Men's singles	Kanetkar (IND); L 7–15, 15–13, 13–15	Did not advance				
José Antonio Crespo; Sergio Llopis	Men's doubles	Lee D-S / Yoo Y-S (KOR); L 3–15, 9–15	Did not advance				

== Basketball ==
Spain's men basketball team qualified for the event by reaching the final of the EuroBasket 2003.

=== Men's tournament ===
Roster

The following is the Spain roster in the men's basketball tournament of the 2004 Summer Olympics.

Spain men's national basketball team – 2004 Summer Olympics roster
Players
Coaches

Pos.	No.	Name	Age – Date of birth	Height	Club	Ctr.
F/C	4	Pau Gasol	24 – 6 July 1980	2.13 m (7 ft 0 in)	Memphis Grizzlies	(United States)
C	5	Iker Iturbe	28 – 10 July 1976	2.01 m (6 ft 7 in)	Adecco Estudiantes	(Spain)
G	6	Comas, Jaume	30 – 2 August 1974	1.86 m (6 ft 1 in)	Caprabo Lleida	(Spain)
G	7	Juan Carlos Navarro	24 – 13 June 1980	1.91 m (6 ft 3 in)	FC Barcelona	(Spain)
G	8	José Calderón	22 – 28 September 1981	1.90 m (6 ft 3 in)	TAU Cerámica	(Spain)
F/C	9	Felipe Reyes	24 – 16 March 1980	2.06 m (6 ft 9 in)	Adecco Estudiantes	(Spain)
F	10	Carlos Jiménez (C)	28 – 10 February 1976	2.04 m (6 ft 8 in)	Adecco Estudiantes	(Spain)
G	11	Óscar Yebra	30 – 15 July 1974	2.00 m (6 ft 7 in)	Forum Valladolid	(Spain)
C	12	Roberto Dueñas	28 – 1 November 1975	2.21 m (7 ft 3 in)	FC Barcelona	(Spain)
G	13	Rudy Fernandez	19 – 4 April 1985	1.96 m (6 ft 5 in)	Joventut Badalona	(Spain)
G	14	Rodrigo De la Fuente	27 – 28 November 1976	2.00 m (6 ft 7 in)	FC Barcelona	(Spain)
F/C	15	Jorge Garbajosa	26 – 19 December 1977	2.07 m (6 ft 9 in)	Benetton Treviso	(Italy)

Head coach

- (Spain) Mario Pesquera

Assistant coach(es)

- (Spain) Joan Creus
- (Spain) Manuel Genaro Díaz

Legend

- (C) Team captain
- nat field describes country
  of last club
  before the tournament
- Age as of August 13, 2004

Group play

Pos	Team	Pld	W	L	PF	PA	PD	Pts	Qualification
1	Spain	5	5	0	405	349	+56	10	Quarterfinals
2	Italy	5	3	2	371	341	+30	8 (Note: Head-to-head record: Italy 1–0 Argentina)	Quarterfinals
3	Argentina	5	3	2	414	396	+18	8	Quarterfinals
4	China	5	2	3	303	382	−79	7	Quarterfinals
5	New Zealand	5	1	4	399	413	−14	6 (Note: Head-to-head record: New Zealand 1–0 Serbia and Montenegro)	9th place playoff
6	Serbia and Montenegro	5	1	4	377	388	−11	6	11th place playoff

Source: FIBA archive
Rules for classification: 1) points; 2) head-to-head points; 3) head-to-head goal average; 4) head-to-head number of points scored.
Notes:

15 August 2004
14:30

China	58–83	Spain
Scoring by quarter: 18–18, 12–24, 13–19, 15–22
Pts: Li Nan 14; Rebs: Mo Ke, Yao Ming 8 each Asts: Liu Wei 2		Pts: Gasol 21; Rebs: Gasol 10; Asts: Calderón, Gasol 2 each

Helliniko Indoor Arena, Athens
Attendance: 9,500
Referees:
Lazaros Voreadis (Greece)
Jorge Vazquez (Puerto Rico)

17 August 2004
20:00

Spain	87–76	Argentina
Scoring by quarter: 25–18, 10–22, 23–20, 29–16
Pts: Gasol 26; Rebs: Gasol 8 Asts: Calderón 5		Pts: Scola 28; Rebs: Scola 9 Asts: 3 players, 4 each

Helliniko Indoor Arena, Athens
Attendance: 12,000
Referees: Lazaros Voreadis (GRE), Mike Homsy (CAN)

19 August 2004
11:15

Italy	63–71	Spain
Scoring by quarter: 22–17, 11–18, 19–13, 11–23
Pts: Righetti 18; Rebs: Chiacig, Marconato 8 each Asts: Basile 3		Pts: Garbajosa 17; Rebs: Garbajosa 8 Asts: Garbajosa 3

Olympic Indoor Hall, Athens
Attendance: 8,950
Referees:
José Carrión (Puerto Rico)
Michael Aylen (Australia)

21 August 2004
11:15

Spain	76–68	Serbia and Montenegro
Scoring by quarter: 18–14, 13–17, 20–21, 25–16
Pts: Calderón 15; Rebs: Reyes 6 Asts: Garbajosa, Navarro 3 each		Pts: Bodiroga 14; Rebs: Tomašević 9 Asts: Rakočević 3

Helliniko Indoor Arena, Athens
Attendance: 10,350
Referees:
Renato Santos (Brazil)
José Monfini (Mexico)

23 August 2004
9:00

Spain	88–84	New Zealand
Scoring by quarter: 19–11, 29–26, 25–31, 15–16
Pts: Garbajosa 17; Rebs: Gasol 10; Asts: Calderón 3		Pts: Jones 23; Rebs: Marks 10; Asts: Dickel 5

Helliniko Indoor Arena, Athens
Attendance: 4,252
Referees:
José Carrión (Puerto Rico)
Mike Homsy (Canada)

Quarterfinals

26 August 2004
14:30

Spain	94–102	United States
Scoring by quarter: 25–25, 18–19, 24–30, 27–28
Pts: Gasol 29; Rebs: Calderón 7 Asts: 3 players, 1 each		Pts: Marbury 31; Rebs: Marion, Odom 6 each Asts: Iverson, Marbury 4 each

Olympic Indoor Hall, Athens
Attendance: 14,500
Referees:
José Ronfini (Mexico)
Michael Aylen (Australia)

Classification match (7th–8th place)

28 August 2004
9:00

7th place

China	76–92	Spain
Scoring by quarter: 21–25, 11–17, 18–23, 26–27
Pts: Li Nan 16; Rebs: Yao Ming 7 Asts: Yao Ming 3		Pts: Gasol 37; Rebs: Gasol 7 Asts: Calderón 6

Olympic Indoor Hall, Athens
Attendance: 8,200
Referees:
Alejandro Chiti (Argentina)
Virginijus Dovidavicius (Lithuania)

=== Women's tournament ===
Roster

The following is the Spain roster in the women's basketball tournament of the 2004 Summer Olympics.

Spain women's national basketball team – 2004 Summer Olympics roster
Players
Coaches

Pos.	No.	Name	Age – Date of birth	Height	Club	Ctr.
F	4	Sonia Blanco	31 – 24 April 1973	1.85 m (6 ft 1 in)	Adecco Estudiantes	(Spain)
G	5	Rosi Sánchez	29 – 2 December 1974	1.76 m (5 ft 9 in)	Pantere	(Italy)
F	6	Laia Palau	24 – 10 September 1979	1.78 m (5 ft 10 in)	UB-Barça	(Spain)
G	7	Nuria Martínez	20 – 29 February 1984	1.74 m (5 ft 9 in)	Perfumerías Salamanca	(Spain)
G	8	Marta Fernández	22 – 21 December 1981	1.79 m (5 ft 10 in)	Ros Casares Valencia	(Spain)
F	9	Amaya Valdemoro	27 – 18 August 1976	1.83 m (6 ft 0 in)	Ros Casares Valencia	(Spain)
F	10	Elisa Aguilar	27 – 15 October 1976	1.89 m (6 ft 2 in)	Ros Casares Valencia	(Spain)
G	11	Begoña García	28 – 11 March 1976	1.70 m (5 ft 7 in)	Basket Parma	(Italy)
C	12	Ingrid Pons	29 – 27 February 1975	1.85 m (6 ft 1 in)	Ros Casares Valencia	(Spain)
F	13	Marina Ferragut	32 – 11 February 1972	1.90 m (6 ft 3 in)	Perfumerías Salamanca	(Spain)
C	14	Elisabeth Cebrián (C)	33 – 6 February 1971	1.96 m (6 ft 5 in)	Adecco Estudiantes	(Spain)
C	15	Lucila Pascua	21 – 21 March 1983	1.95 m (6 ft 5 in)	Filtros Mann Zaragoza	(Spain)

Head coach

- (Spain) Vicente Rodríguez

Assistant coach(es)

- (Spain) Fernando Merchante

Legend

- (C) Team captain
- nat field describes country
  of last club
  before the tournament
- Age as of August 13, 2004

Group play

Pos	Team	Pld	W	L	PF	PA	PD	Pts	Qualification
1	United States	5	5	0	430	285	+145	10	Quarterfinals
2	Spain	5	4	1	368	334	+34	9	Quarterfinals
3	Czech Republic	5	3	2	408	375	+33	8	Quarterfinals
4	New Zealand	5	2	3	321	414	−93	7	Quarterfinals
5	China	5	1	4	360	406	−46	6	
6	South Korea	5	0	5	320	393	−73	5	

Source: FIBA archive
Rules for classification: 1) points; 2) head-to-head points; 3) head-to-head goal average; 4) head-to-head number of points scored.

14 August 2004
22:15

Spain	80–78 (OT)	Czech Republic
Scoring by quarter: 24–22, 11–12, 15–11, 17–22, Overtime: 13–11
Pts: Palau, Valdemoro 14; Rebs: Cebrián 11; Asts: M. Fernández, Palau 2		Pts: Večeřová 15; Rebs: Klimešová 8 Asts: Hamzová 3

Helliniko Indoor Arena, Athens
Attendance: 2,307
Referees:
Mike Homsy (Canada)
Michael Aylen (Australia)

16 August 2004
16:45

China	67–75	Spain
Scoring by quarter: 10–34, 19–14, 15–22, 23–5
Pts: Chen N. 18; Rebs: Chen N. 9 Asts: Song 4		Pts: Valdemoro 30; Rebs: Pascua 8 Asts: M. Fernández, Palau 5

Helliniko Indoor Arena, Athens
Attendance: 1,200
Referees:
Renato Santos (Brazil)
Scott Butler (Australia)

18 August 2004
22:15

Spain	91–57	New Zealand
Scoring by quarter: 32–8, 13–21, 20–9, 26–19
Pts: Palau 15; Rebs: Cebrián, Pascua 9 Asts: Palau 4		Pts: Marino 21; Rebs: Loffhagen 8 Asts: Loffhagen, Marino 3

Helliniko Indoor Arena, Athens
Attendance: 1,350
Referees:
Elizabeth Sisk (United States)
Shoko Suguro (Japan)

20 August 2004
14:30

United States	71–58	Spain
Scoring by quarter: 19–16, 12–13, 19–12, 21–17
Pts: Leslie 19; Rebs: Leslie 9 Asts: Staley 6		Pts: Valdemoro 22; Rebs: Pascua 11; Asts: Palau 3

Helliniko Indoor Arena, Athens
Attendance: 1,352
Referees:
Christos Christodoulou (Greece)
Tatiana Steigerwald (Brazil)

22 August 2004
22:15

Spain	64–61	South Korea
Scoring by quarter: 14–11, 15–16, 17–19, 18–15
Pts: Valdemoro 11; Rebs: Pons 9 Asts: Palau 3		Pts: Beon 19; Rebs: Kim Y. 6 Asts: Lee M 6

Helliniko Indoor Arena, Athens
Attendance: 1,152
Referees:
Elizabeth Sisk (United States)
Song Yanping (China)

Quarterfinals

25 August 2004
20:00

Spain	63–67	Brazil
Scoring by quarter: 16–14, 18–20, 12–15, 17–18
Pts: M. Fernández 16; Rebs: Pascua 6 Asts: Palau 3		Pts: Arcain 27; Rebs: Oliveira, Sobral 8 Asts: Luz 3

Olympic Indoor Hall, Athens
Attendance: 13,500
Referees:
Lazaros Voreadis (Greece)
Nancy Ethier (Brazil)

Classification match (5th–6th place)

27 August 2004
11:15

5th place

Czech Republic	79–68	Spain
Scoring by quarter: 19–12, 21–15, 17–18, 22–23
Pts: Machová 22; Rebs: Klimešová 14; Asts: Hamzová 4		Pts: Valdemoro 24; Rebs: Pascua 6 Asts: Three players 1

Olympic Indoor Hall, Athens
Attendance: 4,650
Referees:
Corbin Sean (United States)
Vladimir Okhrimenko (Russia)

== Canoeing ==
=== Slalom ===
Athlete	Event	Preliminary						Semifinal		Final			
Athlete	Event	Run 1	Rank	Run 2	Rank	Total	Rank	Time	Rank	Time	Rank	Total	Rank
Jordi Sangrá Gibert	Men's C-1	108.48	14	104.06	9	212.54	11 Q	99.84	6 Q	100.57	7	200.41	7
Carles Juanmartí	Men's K-1	99.47	15	96.61	=7	196.08	13 Q	97.73	11	Did not advance			

=== Sprint ===
Men

Athlete	Event	Heats		Semifinals		Final	
Athlete	Event	Time	Rank	Time	Rank	Time	Rank
David Cal	C-1 500 m	1:48.397	1 Q	Bye		1:46.723	2nd place, silver medalist(s)
David Cal	C-1 1000 m	3:50.091 OB	1 Q	Bye		3:46.201 OB	1st place, gold medalist(s)
Carlos Pérez	K-1 500 m	1:40.149	5 q	1:41.335	6	Did not advance	
Pablo Banos; Javier Hernanz	K-2 1000 m	3:12.216	4 q	3:13.701	4	Did not advance	
José Alfredo Bea; David Mascató	C-2 500 m	1:43.708	6 q	1:43.160	5	Did not advance	
José Alfredo Bea; David Mascató	C-2 1000 m	3:32.355	4 q	3:31.876	1 Q	3:45.766	7
Francisco Llera; Damián Vindel	K-2 500 m	1:32.846	3 q	1:30.998	3 Q	1:29.532	6

Women

Athlete	Event	Heats		Semifinals		Final	
Athlete	Event	Time	Rank	Time	Rank	Time	Rank
Beatriz Manchón; María Teresa Portela	K-2 500 m	1:41.338	2 Q	Bye		1:42.409	5
María García; Beatriz Manchón; María Teresa Portela; Jana Smidakova	K-4 500 m	1:34.525	4 Q	Bye		1:37.908	5

Qualification Legend: Q = Qualify to final; q = Qualify to semifinal

== Cycling ==
=== Road ===
Men

Athlete	Event	Time	Rank
Igor Astarloa	Road race	Did not finish	
Óscar Freire	Road race	Did not finish	
Igor González de Galdeano	Road race	Did not finish	
Igor González de Galdeano	Time trial	59:27.25	8
Iván Gutiérrez	Road race	Did not finish	
Iván Gutiérrez	Time trial	1:00:22.80	16
Alejandro Valverde	Road race	5:44:13	47

Women

Athlete	Event	Time	Rank
Eneritz Iturriaga	Road race	3:28:39	34
Dori Ruano	Road race	Did not finish	
Dori Ruano	Time trial	33:29.63	18
Joane Somarriba	Road race	32:25.93	7
Joane Somarriba	Time trial	3:25:06	7

=== Track ===
Sprint

Athlete	Event	Qualification		Round 1	Repechage 1	Round 2	Repechage 2	Quarterfinals	Semifinals	Final	
Athlete	Event	Time Speed (km/h)	Rank	Opposition Time Speed (km/h)	Opposition Time Speed (km/h)	Opposition Time Speed (km/h)	Opposition Time Speed (km/h)	Opposition Time Speed (km/h)	Opposition Time Speed (km/h)	Opposition Time Speed (km/h)	Rank
José Antonio Villanueva	Men's sprint	10.446; 68.925	8	Ng (MAS); W 11.234; 64.091	Bye	Gané (FRA); L	Forde (BAR); Mulder (NED); L REL	Did not advance		9th place final Mulder (NED); Ng (MAS); Eadie (AUS); W 11.063	9
José Antonio Escuredo; Salvador Meliá; José Antonio Villanueva	Men's team sprint	44.452; 60.739	4 Q	Australia; L 44.687; 60.420	—N/a					Did not advance	7

Pursuit

Athlete	Event	Qualification		Semifinals		Final	
Athlete	Event	Time	Rank	Opponent Results	Rank	Opponent Results	Rank
Carlos Castaño	Men's individual pursuit	4:27.871	12	Did not advance			
Sergi Escobar	Men's individual pursuit	4:16.862	2 Q	Roberts (AUS); 4:19.581	4 Q	Hayles (GBR); 4:17.947	3rd place, bronze medalist(s)
Carlos Castaño; Sergi Escobar; Asier Maeztu; Carlos Torrent*	Men's team pursuit	4:04.421	3 Q	Ukraine; 4:02.374	3 Q	Germany; 4:05.523	3rd place, bronze medalist(s)

Time trial

Athlete	Event	Time	Rank
Rubén Donet	Men's time trial	1:03.505	12

Keirin

Athlete	Event	1st round	Repechage	2nd round	Final
Athlete	Event	Rank	Rank	Rank	Rank
José Antonio Escuredo	Men's keirin	2 Q	Bye	3 Q	2nd place, silver medalist(s)

Omnium

Athlete	Event	Points	Laps	Rank
Joan Llaneras	Men's points race	82	3	2nd place, silver medalist(s)
Gema Pascual	Women's points race	7	0	7
Miquel Alzamora; Joan Llaneras	Men's madison	7	0	6

=== Mountain biking ===
Athlete	Event	Time	Rank
Ivan Alvarez	Men's cross-country	2:23:08	16
José Antonio Hermida	Men's cross-country	2:16:02	2nd place, silver medalist(s)
Marga Fullana	Women's cross-country	Did not finish	

== Diving ==
Spanish divers qualified for three individual spots at the 2004 Olympic Games.

Men

Athlete	Event	Preliminaries		Semifinals		Final	
Athlete	Event	Points	Rank	Points	Rank	Points	Rank
Javier Illana	3 m springboard	385.80	19	Did not advance			

Women

Athlete	Event	Preliminaries		Semifinals		Final	
Athlete	Event	Points	Rank	Points	Rank	Points	Rank
Leyre Eizaguirre	3 m springboard	242.73	24	Did not advance			
Dolores Saez	10 m platform	278.43	20	Did not advance			
Leire Santos	10 m platform	246.84	29	Did not advance			

== Equestrian ==
=== Dressage ===
Athlete	Horse	Event	Grand Prix		Grand Prix Special		Grand Prix Freestyle		Overall	
Athlete	Horse	Event	Score	Rank	Score	Rank	Score	Rank	Score	Rank
Beatriz Ferrer-Salat	Beauvalais	Individual	74.667	2 Q	75.760	3 Q	79.575	3	76.667	3rd place, bronze medalist(s)
Juan Antonio Jimenez	Guizo	Individual	71.292	=10 Q	68.240	20 Q	75.400	10	71.644	12
Ignacio Rambla	Oleaje	Individual	64.750	41	Did not advance					
Rafael Soto	Invasor	Individual	72.792	7 Q	69.000	12 Q	79.025	4	73.606	8
Beatriz Ferrer-Salat; Juan Antonio Jimenez; Ignacio Rambla; Rafael Soto	See above	Team	—N/a						72.917	2nd place, silver medalist(s)

== Fencing ==
Spain qualified one fencer.

Men

Athlete	Event	Round of 64	Round of 32	Round of 16	Quarterfinal	Semifinal	Final / BM	
Athlete	Event	Opposition Score	Opposition Score	Opposition Score	Opposition Score	Opposition Score	Opposition Score	Rank
Fernando Medina	Individual sabre	Kothny (THA); W 15–13	Lukashenko (UKR); L 11–15	Did not advance				

== Field hockey ==
Spain qualified a men's and a women's team. Each team had 16 athletes with two reserves.

=== Men's tournament ===
Roster

The following is the Spanish roster in the men's field hockey tournament of the 2004 Summer Olympics.

Head coach: Maurits Hendriks

1. Bernardino Herrera (GK)
2. Santi Freixa
5. Francisco Fábregas
7. Juan Escarré
8. Alex Fábregas
9. Pablo Amat
10. Eduardo Tubau
11. Eduardo Aguilar
13. Eduardo Tubau
14. Josep Sánchez
15. Víctor Sojo
16. Xavier Ribas
17. Albert Sala
18. Rodrigo Garza
19. Javier Bruses
23. David Alegre

Group play

Pos	Team	Pld	W	D	L	GF	GA	GD	Pts	Qualification
1	Spain	5	3	2	0	14	3	+11	11	Semi-finals
2	Germany	5	3	2	0	15	6	+9	11	Semi-finals
3	Pakistan	5	3	0	2	19	8	+11	9	5–8th place semi-finals
4	South Korea	5	2	2	1	17	8	+9	8	5–8th place semi-finals
5	Great Britain	5	1	0	4	9	21	−12	3	9–12th place semi-finals
6	Egypt	5	0	0	5	2	30	−28	0	9–12th place semi-finals

Source: FIH

15 August 2004
18:00

South Korea	1 – 1	Spain
You Hyo-Sik 16'	Report	Freixa 43'

Umpires:
Sumesh Putra (CAN)
Peter Elders (NED)

17 August 2004
20:30

Spain	1 – 1	Germany
Freixa 28'	Report	Bechmann 64'

Umpires:
Henrik Ehlers (DEN)
Murray Grime (AUS)

19 August 2004
18:30

Great Britain	1 – 5	Spain
Middleton 57'	Report	Amat 7', 38'; Freixa 32', 35'; Ribas 61'

Umpires:
Satinder Kumar (IND)
Christian Blasch (GER)

21 August 2004
20:00

Spain	4 – 0	Pakistan
Tubau 6', 35', 41'; Freixa 63'	Report

Umpires:
Peter Elders (NED)
John Wright (RSA)

23 August 2004
10:30

Spain	3 – 0	Egypt
Tubau 6', 65'; Amat 62'	Report

Umpires:
David Leiper (GBR)
Han Jin-Soo (KOR)

Semifinals

25 August 2004
21:00

Spain	3 – 6	Australia
Tubau 8'; Ribas 49', 67'	Report	Elder 3'; McCann 23', 44'; Wells 27'; Schubert 51', 53'

Umpires:
John Wright (RSA)
Henrik Ehlers (DEN)

Bronze medal match

27 August 2004
18:00

Germany	4 – 3 (a.e.t.)	Spain
Reinelt 22'; Duckwitz 45'; Emmerling 49'; Michel 80'	Report	Freixa 31'; Tubau 39', 47'

Umpires:
Murray Grime (AUS)
Henrik Ehlers (DEN)

=== Women's tournament ===
Roster

The following is the Spanish roster in the women's field hockey tournament of the 2004 Summer Olympics.

Head coach: Pablo Usoz

1. María Jesús Rosa (GK)
3. Rocío Ybarra
4. Bárbara Malda
5. Mónica Rueda
6. Silvia Bonastre
7. María del Carmen Martín
8. Marta Prat
9. Silvia Muñoz
10. Lucía López
11. María del Mar Feito
12. Maider Tellería
15. Erdoitza Goikoetxea
17. Núria Camón
18. Ana Pérez
19. Maider Luengo
21. Esther Termens

Group play

Pos	Team	Pld	W	D	L	GF	GA	GD	Pts	Qualification
1	China	4	4	0	0	11	2	+9	12	Semi-finals
2	Argentina	4	3	0	1	12	4	+8	9	Semi-finals
3	Japan	4	2	0	2	5	7	−2	6	
4	New Zealand	4	1	0	3	3	9	−6	3	
5	Spain	4	0	0	4	3	12	−9	0	

Source: FIH
Rules for classification: 1) Points; 2) Matches won; 3) Goal difference; 4) Goals for; 5) Head-to-head result.

14 August 2004
20:00

Argentina	4 – 0	Spain
Stepnik 11'; Rognoni 25'; González Oliva 28'; Oneto 69'	Report

Umpires:
Julie Ashton-Lucy (AUS)
Ute Conen (GER)

18 August 2004
08:30

China	3 – 0	Spain
Tang Chunling 14'; Fu Baorong 35'; Gao Lihua 58'	Report

Umpires:
Sarah Garnett (NZL)
Minka Woolley (AUS)

20 August 2004
20:00

Spain	1 – 2	Japan
Termens 67'	Report	Morimoto 5'; Komazawa 34'

Umpires:
Jean Duncan (GBR)
Ute Conen (GER)

22 August 2004
10:30

Spain	2 – 3	New Zealand
Goikoetxea 21', 40'	Report	Provan 21'; Roberts-Lang 30'; Igasan 50'

Umpires:
Chieko Akiyama (JPN)
Julie Ashton-Lucy (AUS)

== Gymnastics ==
=== Artistic ===
Men
Team

Athlete	Event	Qualification								Final							
Athlete	Event	Apparatus						Total	Rank	Apparatus						Total	Rank
Athlete	Event	F	PH	R	V	PB	HB	Total	Rank	F	PH	R	V	PB	HB	Total	Rank
Alejandro Barrenechea	Team	9.412	8.912	9.362	9.162	8.975	9.275	55.098	30	Did not advance							
Víctor Cano	Team	9.150	9.750 Q	9.575	9.087	8.475	7.950	53.987	40	Did not advance							
Jesús Carballo	Team	—N/a	9.175	—N/a		9.187	8.737	—N/a		Did not advance							
Oriol Combarros	Team	9.325	9.650	9.625	9.375	8.637	8.050	54.662	37	Did not advance							
Gervasio Deferr	Team	9.750 Q	—N/a		9.637	—N/a				Did not advance							
Rafael Martínez	Team	9.562	8.962	9.675	9.412	9.325	9.700	56.636	14 Q	Did not advance							
Total	Team	38.049	37.537	38.237	37.586	36.124	35.762	223.295	10	Did not advance							

Individual finals

Athlete	Event	Apparatus						Total	Rank
Athlete	Event	F	PH	R	V	PB	HB	Total	Rank
Víctor Cano	Pommel horse	—N/a	9.762	—N/a				9.762	5
Gervasio Deferr	Floor	9.712	—N/a					9.712	4
Gervasio Deferr	Vault	—N/a			9.737	—N/a		9.737	1st place, gold medalist(s)
Rafael Martínez	All-around	9.500	9.687	9.575	9.612	9.700	9.475	57.549	5

Women
Team

Athlete	Event	Qualification						Final					
Athlete	Event	Apparatus				Total	Rank	Apparatus				Total	Rank
Athlete	Event	V	UB	BB	F	Total	Rank	V	UB	BB	F	Total	Rank
Laura Campos	Team	8.725	9.262	8.225	—N/a			Did not compete					
Tania Gener	Team	9.300	9.575	—N/a	9.112	—N/a		9.275	9.500	—N/a			
Elena Gómez	Team	9.212	9.525	8.737	9.500	36.974	18 Q	9.187	9.475	9.000	9.575	—N/a	
Mónica Mesalles	Team	9.225	—N/a	9.037	9.412	—N/a		9.137	—N/a	9.312	8.800	—N/a	
Patricia Moreno	Team	9.162	9.375	7.850	9.587 Q	35.974	37	—N/a			9.462	—N/a	
Sara Moro	Team	—N/a	9.450	9.487	—N/a			—N/a	9.437	9.412	—N/a	—N/a	
Total	Team	36.899	37.925	35.986	37.611	147.921	7 Q	27.599	28.412	27.724	27.837	111.572	5

Individual finals

Athlete	Event	Apparatus				Total	Rank
Athlete	Event	V	UB	BB	F	Total	Rank
Elena Gómez	All-around	9.150	9.525	9.162	9.462	37.299	8
Patricia Moreno	Floor	—N/a			9.487	9.487	3rd place, bronze medalist(s)

=== Rhythmic ===
Athlete	Event	Qualification						Final					
Athlete	Event	Hoop	Ball	Clubs	Ribbon	Total	Rank	Hoop	Ball	Clubs	Ribbon	Total	Rank
Almudena Cid	Individual	24.975	24.900	24.700	23.150	97.725	9 Q	25.125	25.000	24.900	23.425	98.450	8

Athlete	Event	Qualification				Final			
Athlete	Event	5 ribbons	3 hoops 2 balls	Total	Rank	5 ribbons	3 hoops 2 balls	Total	Rank
Sonia Abejón; Bárbara González; Marta Linares; Isabel Pagán; Carolina Rodríguez; Nuria Velasco	Team	21.200	23.400	44.600	8 Q	22.400	22.950	45.350	7

== Handball ==
=== Men's tournament ===
Roster

The following is the Spain roster in the men's handball tournament of the 2004 Summer Olympics.

Head coaches: Cesar Argiles

No.	Pos.	Name	Date of birth (age)	Height	App.	Goals	Club
1	GK	José Javier Hombrados	7 April 1972 (aged 32)	1.97 m			(Spain) BM Ciudad Real
2	LB	Alberto Entrerríos	7 November 1976 (aged 27)	1.92 m			(Spain) BM Ciudad Real
6	LW	Xavier O'Callaghan	2 March 1972 (aged 32)	1.86 m			(Spain) FC Barcelona Handbol
8	RB	Jon Belaustegui	19 March 1979 (aged 25)	1.95 m			(Germany) HSV Hamburg
9	RB	Mateo Garralda	1 December 1969 (aged 34)	1.96 m			(Spain) Portland San Antonio
10	CB	Talant Duyshebaev	6 February 1968 (aged 36)	1.83 m			(Spain) BM Ciudad Real
11	CB	Demetrio Lozano	26 September 1975 (aged 28)	1.96 m			(Germany) THW Kiel
13	RW	Fernando Hernández	24 February 1973 (aged 31)	1.85 m			(Spain) FC Barcelona Handbol
14	P	Juan Pérez	3 January 1974 (aged 30)	2.02 m			(Spain) Portland San Antonio
15	P	Manuel Colón	18 February 1977 (aged 27)	1.95 m			(Spain) Ademar Leon
16	GK	David Barrufet	4 June 1970 (aged 34)	1.97 m			(Spain) FC Barcelona Handbol
17	LW	Juanín García	28 August 1977 (aged 26)	1.76 m			(Spain) Ademar Leon
18	LB	Iker Romero	15 June 1980 (aged 24)	1.96 m			(Spain) FC Barcelona Handbol
19	P	Rolando Urios	27 January 1971 (aged 33)	1.93 m			(Spain) BM Ciudad Real
20	RW	Antonio Carlos Ortega	14 July 1971 (aged 33)	1.84 m			(Spain) FC Barcelona

Group play

Pos	Team	Pld	W	D	L	GF	GA	GD	Pts	Qualification
1	Croatia	5	5	0	0	146	129	+17	10	Quarterfinals
2	Spain	5	4	0	1	154	137	+17	8	Quarterfinals
3	South Korea	5	2	0	3	148	148	0	4 (Note: South Korea 35–32 Russia)	Quarterfinals
4	Russia	5	2	0	3	145	145	0	4	Quarterfinals
5	Iceland	5	1	0	4	143	158	−15	2 (Note: Iceland 30–25 Slovenia)	
6	Slovenia	5	1	0	4	130	149	−19	2	

Rules for classification: 1) Points; 2) Head-to-head points; 3) Head-to-head goal difference; 4) Head-to-head goals scored; 5) Goal difference; 6) Goals scored; 7) Draw.
Notes:

14 August 2004; 09:30	Spain	31 – 30	South Korea	Sports Pavilion, Athens; Referees: Bavas, Migas (GRE)
14 August 2004; 09:30	García 6	(17-12)	Yoon K, Paek 6	Sports Pavilion, Athens; Referees: Bavas, Migas (GRE)
14 August 2004; 09:30	3× (yellow card) 8× (suspension) 1× (red card)		4× (yellow card) 3× (suspension) 1× (red card)	Sports Pavilion, Athens; Referees: Bavas, Migas (GRE)

16 August 2004; 14:30	Iceland	23 – 31	Spain	Sports Pavilion, Athens; Referees: Bord, Buy (FRA)
16 August 2004; 14:30	Stefansson 6	(12-13)	Duyshebaev, Romero 5	Sports Pavilion, Athens; Referees: Bord, Buy (FRA)
16 August 2004; 14:30	2× (yellow card) 3× (suspension)		3× (yellow card) 3× (suspension)	Sports Pavilion, Athens; Referees: Bord, Buy (FRA)

18 August 2004; 19:30	Spain	29 – 26	Russia	Sports Pavilion, Athens; Referees: Nachevski, Nachevski (MKD)
18 August 2004; 19:30	3 players with 5	(11-11)	Rastvortsev 6	Sports Pavilion, Athens; Referees: Nachevski, Nachevski (MKD)
18 August 2004; 19:30	3× (yellow card) 6× (suspension)		3× (yellow card) 7× (suspension) 1× (red card)	Sports Pavilion, Athens; Referees: Nachevski, Nachevski (MKD)

20 August 2004; 11:30	Spain	41 – 28	Slovenia	Sports Pavilion, Athens; Referees: Lemme, Ullrich (GER)
20 August 2004; 11:30	Romero 7	(18-15)	Tomšič, Pajovič 7	Sports Pavilion, Athens; Referees: Lemme, Ullrich (GER)
20 August 2004; 11:30	2× (yellow card) 3× (suspension)		4× (yellow card) 3× (suspension)	Sports Pavilion, Athens; Referees: Lemme, Ullrich (GER)

22 August 2004; 11:30	Croatia	30 – 22	Spain	Sports Pavilion, Athens; Referees: Baum, Goralczyk (POL)
22 August 2004; 11:30	Džomba 7	(15-9)	García 5	Sports Pavilion, Athens; Referees: Baum, Goralczyk (POL)
22 August 2004; 11:30	3× (yellow card) 1× (suspension)		3× (yellow card) 4× (suspension)	Sports Pavilion, Athens; Referees: Baum, Goralczyk (POL)

Quarterfinals

24 August 2004
19:30
Germany
32 – 30 (ET)
Spain
Sports Pavilion, Athens
Referees: Arnaldsson, Vidarsson (ISL)
Schwarzer, Stephan 9
(15-16)
García 7
3× (yellow card) 4× (suspension)

3× (yellow card) 4× (suspension)

FT: 27-27 ET: 28-28, 30-30

Classification match (7th–8th place)

27 August 2004; 09:30	Spain	27 – 29	France	Helliniko Olympic Indoor Arena; Referees: Boye, Jensen (DEN)
27 August 2004; 09:30	Romero, Ortega 5	(13-11)	Burdet, Girault 8	Helliniko Olympic Indoor Arena; Referees: Boye, Jensen (DEN)
27 August 2004; 09:30	3× (yellow card) 3× (suspension)		3× (yellow card) 4× (suspension)	Helliniko Olympic Indoor Arena; Referees: Boye, Jensen (DEN)

=== Women's tournament ===
Roster

The following is the Spain roster in the women's handball tournament of the 2004 Summer Olympics.

Head coaches: Jose Aldeguer

No.	Pos.	Name	Date of birth (age)	Height	App.	Goals	Club
1	GK	Elisabeth López	27 January 1975 (aged 29)	1.79 m			(Spain) Mar Valencia
2	RB	Soraya Garcia	21 March 1978 (aged 26)	1.73 m			(Spain) CP Goya Almería
3	RW	Susana Pareja	13 March 1975 (aged 29)	1.66 m			(Spain) Ferrobus Mislata
5	LW	Vanessa Amorós	7 December 1982 (aged 21)	1.65 m			(Spain) BM Elche
6	RW	Cristina Lopez	8 July 1975 (aged 29)	1.68 m			(Spain) Akaba Bera Bera
7	LB	Maite Andreu	26 January 1971 (aged 33)	1.85 m			(Spain) Ferrobus Mislata
8	P	Cristina Gómez	22 March 1968 (aged 36)	1.68 m			(Spain) Mar Valencia
9	CB	Marta Mangué	23 April 1983 (aged 21)	1.70 m			(Spain) Mar Valencia
10	P	Diana Box	6 March 1971 (aged 33)	1.72 m			(Spain) BM Femenino Elda
11	CB	Montserrat Puche	22 May 1970 (aged 34)	1.71 m			(Spain) Mar Valencia
13	LB	Susana Fraile	4 July 1978 (aged 26)	1.83 m			(Spain) BM Femenino Elda
14	CB	Patricia Alonso	27 April 1979 (aged 25)	1.70 m			(Spain) Ferrobus Mislata
15	RB	Isabel Ortuno	16 March 1982 (aged 22)	1.77 m			(Spain) BM Femenino Elda
16	GK	Eugenia Sanchez	25 July 1969 (aged 34)	1.71 m			(Spain) BM Femenino Elda
20	LW	Noelia Oncina	9 November 1976 (aged 27)	1.66 m			(Spain) Mar Valencia

Group play

Pos	Team	Pld	W	D	L	GF	GA	GD	Pts	Qualification
1	South Korea	4	3	1	0	135	103	+32	7 (Note: South Korea 29–29 Denmark)	Quarterfinals
2	Denmark	4	3	1	0	125	98	+27	7	Quarterfinals
3	France	4	2	0	2	105	106	−1	4	Quarterfinals
4	Spain	4	0	1	3	86	110	−24	1 (Note: Spain 24–24 Angola)	Quarterfinals
5	Angola	4	0	1	3	97	131	−34	1	

Rules for classification: 1) Points; 2) Head-to-head points; 3) Head-to-head goal difference; 4) Head-to-head goals scored; 5) Goal difference; 6) Goals scored; 7) Draw.
Notes:

15 August 2004; 19:30	Spain	24 – 24	Angola	Sports Pavilion, Athens; Referees: Gardinovacki, Maric (SCG)
15 August 2004; 19:30	Puche 13	(14-10)	Belezura, Dionísia 5	Sports Pavilion, Athens; Referees: Gardinovacki, Maric (SCG)
15 August 2004; 19:30	3× (yellow card) 4× (suspension)		2× (yellow card) 6× (suspension)	Sports Pavilion, Athens; Referees: Gardinovacki, Maric (SCG)

17 August 2004; 21:30	France	27 – 20	Spain	Sports Pavilion, Athens; Referees: Lemme, Ullrich (GER)
17 August 2004; 21:30	Lejeune, Tervel 6	(13-10)	Puche 5	Sports Pavilion, Athens; Referees: Lemme, Ullrich (GER)
17 August 2004; 21:30	3× (yellow card) 4× (suspension)		3× (yellow card) 3× (suspension)	Sports Pavilion, Athens; Referees: Lemme, Ullrich (GER)

19 August 2004; 21:30	Spain	21 – 23	Denmark	Sports Pavilion, Athens; Referees: Hassan, Aly (EGY)
19 August 2004; 21:30	Mangué 6	(8-14)	Thomsen, Andersen 4	Sports Pavilion, Athens; Referees: Hassan, Aly (EGY)
19 August 2004; 21:30	3× (yellow card) 5× (suspension)		4× (yellow card) 1× (suspension)	Sports Pavilion, Athens; Referees: Hassan, Aly (EGY)

21 August 2004; 19:30	South Korea	36 – 21	Spain	Sports Pavilion, Athens; Referees: Pozeznik, Repensek (SLO)
21 August 2004; 19:30	Woo, Lee S 7	(20-7)	Gomėz 5	Sports Pavilion, Athens; Referees: Pozeznik, Repensek (SLO)
21 August 2004; 19:30	3× (yellow card) 3× (suspension)		3× (yellow card) 4× (suspension)	Sports Pavilion, Athens; Referees: Pozeznik, Repensek (SLO)

Quarterfinals

26 August 2004; 14:30	Ukraine	25 – 23	Spain	Helliniko Olympic Indoor Arena; Referees: Hansson, Olsson (SWE)
26 August 2004; 14:30	3 players with 4	(12-9)	Ortuno 6	Helliniko Olympic Indoor Arena; Referees: Hansson, Olsson (SWE)
26 August 2004; 14:30	3× (yellow card) 4× (suspension)		3× (yellow card) 2× (suspension)	Helliniko Olympic Indoor Arena; Referees: Hansson, Olsson (SWE)

Classification semifinals

28 August 2004; 09:30	Spain	27 – 23	China	Helliniko Olympic Indoor Arena; Referees: Aly Hassan, Yasser (EGY)
28 August 2004; 09:30	García, Puche 5	(16-10)	Wang Shasha 7	Helliniko Olympic Indoor Arena; Referees: Aly Hassan, Yasser (EGY)
28 August 2004; 09:30	4× (yellow card) 2× (suspension)		3× (yellow card) 1× (suspension)	Helliniko Olympic Indoor Arena; Referees: Aly Hassan, Yasser (EGY)

5th place match

29 August 2004; 14:30	Spain	29 – 38	Hungary	Helliniko Olympic Indoor Arena; Referees: Boye, Jensen (DEN)
29 August 2004; 14:30	Puche 7	(15-22)	Radulovics 10	Helliniko Olympic Indoor Arena; Referees: Boye, Jensen (DEN)
29 August 2004; 14:30	3× (yellow card) 3× (suspension)		3× (yellow card) 6× (suspension)	Helliniko Olympic Indoor Arena; Referees: Boye, Jensen (DEN)

== Judo ==
Ten Spanish judoka qualified for the following events.

Men

Athlete	Event	Preliminary	Round of 32	Round of 16	Quarterfinals	Semifinals	Repechage 1	Repechage 2	Repechage 3	Final / BM	
Athlete	Event	Opposition Result	Opposition Result	Opposition Result	Opposition Result	Opposition Result	Opposition Result	Opposition Result	Opposition Result	Opposition Result	Rank
Kenji Uematsu	−60 kg	Bye	Khergiani (GEO); L 0010–1001	Did not advance			Donbay (KAZ); W 0200–0001	Stanev (RUS); W 0001–0000	Zintiridis (RUS); W 1000–0100	Tsagaanbaatar (MGL); L 0000–0010	5
Óscar Peñas	−66 kg	—N/a	Méndez (PUR); W 1000–0000	Krnáč (SVK); L 0000–1011	Did not advance		Alassane (NIG); W 1101–0000	Meridja (ALG); W 0020–0001	Pina (POR); W 0020–0010	Georgiev (BUL); L 0000–0001	5
Kiyoshi Uematsu	−73 kg	Guilheiro (BRA); L 0000–0010	Did not advance								
Ricardo Echarte	−81 kg	—N/a	Chahkhandagh (IRI); L 0000–1000	Did not advance							
David Alarza	−90 kg	—N/a	Grekov (UKR); L 0010–0111	Did not advance							
Aytami Ruano	+100 kg	Kim S-B (KOR); L 0001–0010	Did not advance								

Women

Athlete	Event	Round of 32	Round of 16	Quarterfinals	Semifinals	Repechage 1	Repechage 2	Repechage 3	Final / BM	
Athlete	Event	Opposition Result	Opposition Result	Opposition Result	Opposition Result	Opposition Result	Opposition Result	Opposition Result	Opposition Result	Rank
Isabel Fernández	−57 kg	Bönisch (GER); L 0011–0121	Did not advance			García (PUR); W 1011–0000	Kusakabe (JPN); W 0010–0001	Cavazzuti (ITA); W 0010–0001	Lupetey (CUB); L 0000–0010	5
Sara Álvarez	−63 kg	Décosse (FRA); L 0001–1000	Did not advance							
Cecilia Blanco	−70 kg	Razayee (AFG); W 1000–0000	Bosch (NED); L 0101–0111	Did not advance		Bye	Copes (ARG); W 1011–0000	Qin Dy (CHN); L 0000–1002	Did not advance	
Esther San Miguel	−78 kg	Bye	Wilding (GBR); L 0011–1011	Did not advance						

== Rowing ==
Spanish rowers qualified the following boats:

Men

Athlete	Event	Heats		Repechage		Semifinals		Final	
Athlete	Event	Time	Rank	Time	Rank	Time	Rank	Time	Rank
Rubén Álvarez; Juan Zunzunegui	Lightweight double sculls	6:23.23	3 R	6:26.66	2 SA/B	6:30.15	6 FB	6:46.48	8
Mario Arranz; Alberto Domínguez; Jesús González; Carlos Loriente	Lightweight four	6:11.70	5 R	5:56.15	3 SA/B	6:07.01	6 FB	6:26.15	12

Women

Athlete	Event	Heats		Repechage		Semifinals		Final	
Athlete	Event	Time	Rank	Time	Rank	Time	Rank	Time	Rank
Nuria Domínguez	Single sculls	7:55.60	4 R	7:40.31	2 SA/B/C	7:43.59	3 FA	7:49.11	6
Teresa Más; Eva Mirones	Lightweight double sculls	7:02.33	3 R	7:02.91	3 SA/B	7:09.21	6 FB	7:41.23	11

Qualification Legend: FA=Final A (medal); FB=Final B (non-medal); FC=Final C (non-medal); FD=Final D (non-medal); FE=Final E (non-medal); FF=Final F (non-medal); SA/B=Semifinals A/B; SC/D=Semifinals C/D; SE/F=Semifinals E/F; R=Repechage

== Sailing ==
Spanish sailors have qualified one boat for each of the following events.

Men

Athlete	Event	Race											Net points	Final rank
Athlete	Event	1	2	3	4	5	6	7	8	9	10	M*	Net points	Final rank
Iván Pastor	Mistral	15	10	11	2	9	~~OCS~~	18	15	10	18	4	112	12
Rafael Trujillo	Finn	8	3	3	6	2	3	~~OCS~~	4	5	4	13	51	2nd place, silver medalist(s)
Gustavo Martínez; Dimas Wood	470	7	22	12	10	3	11	26	21	16	10	~~OCS~~	138	20
Pablo Arrarte; Roberto Bermúdez	Star	2	13	5	6	~~17~~	8	13	6	12	15	5	85	10

Women

Athlete	Event	Race											Net points	Final rank
Athlete	Event	1	2	3	4	5	6	7	8	9	10	M*	Net points	Final rank
Blanca Manchón	Mistral	10	5	14	13	3	11	13	~~15~~	8	7	11	95	8
Neus Garriga	Europe	20	15	14	7	11	8	5	15	~~OCS~~	6	7	98	13
Sandra Azón; Natalia Vía Dufresne	470	2	4	9	15	~~19~~	5	8	3	5	6	5	62	2nd place, silver medalist(s)
Mónica Azón; Graciela Pisonero; Marina Sánchez	Yngling	7	7	10	~~14~~	11	11	7	12	4	6	11	86	12

Open

Athlete	Event	Race																Net points	Final rank
Athlete	Event	1	2	3	4	5	6	7	8	9	10	11	12	13	14	15	M*	Net points	Final rank
Luis Martínez	Laser	19	7	13	4	19	18	5	7	4	24	—N/a					~~36~~	120	10
Xabier Fernández; Iker Martínez	49er	3	11	7	5	1	~~12~~	2	6	~~12~~	1	8	2	8	2	4	7	67	1st place, gold medalist(s)
Fernando Echavarri; Antón Paz	Tornado	3	4	13	RDG	~~18~~	6	2	6	7	13	—N/a					12	74	8

M = Medal race; OCS = On course side of the starting line; DSQ = Disqualified; DNF = Did not finish; DNS= Did not start; RDG = Redress given

== Shooting ==
Four Spanish shooters (two men and two women) qualified to compete in the following events:

Men

Athlete	Event	Qualification		Final	
Athlete	Event	Points	Rank	Points	Rank
José Antonio Colado	10 m air pistol	572	=33	Did not advance	
José Antonio Colado	50 m pistol	542	=34	Did not advance	
Isidro Lorenzo	10 m air pistol	565	42	Did not advance	
Isidro Lorenzo	50 m pistol	562	5 Q	652	8

Women

Athlete	Event	Qualification		Final	
Athlete	Event	Points	Rank	Points	Rank
María Pilar Fernández	10 m air pistol	374	=30	Did not advance	
María Pilar Fernández	25 m pistol	577	=13	Did not advance	
María Quintanal	Trap	65	2 Q	84	2nd place, silver medalist(s)
María Quintanal	Double trap	97	=13	Did not advance	

== Swimming ==
Spanish swimmers achieved qualifying standards in the following events (up to a maximum of 2 swimmers in each event at the A-standard time, and 1 at the B-standard time):

Men

Athlete	Event	Heat		Semifinal		Final	
Athlete	Event	Time	Rank	Time	Rank	Time	Rank
Eduardo Lorente	50 m freestyle	22.71	23	Did not advance			
Eduardo Lorente	100 m freestyle	50.48	30	Did not advance			
Javier Noriega	50 m freestyle	22.54	14 Q	22.36	13	Did not advance	
Marcos Rivera	400 m freestyle	3:52.39	19	—N/a		Did not advance	
Jorge Sánchez	200 m backstroke	2:00.10	8 Q	2:00.12	13	Did not advance	
Aschwin Wildeboer	100 m backstroke	57.35	35	Did not advance			
Aschwin Wildeboer	200 m backstroke	2:04.33	29	Did not advance			
Olaf Wildeboer	200 m freestyle	1:50.01	17 Q	1:50.61	15	Did not advance	

Women

Athlete	Event	Heat		Semifinal		Final	
Athlete	Event	Result	Rank	Result	Rank	Result	Rank
Ana Belén Palomo	100 m freestyle	25.92	21	Did not advance			
María Peláez	200 m butterfly	2:11.66	10 Q	2:12.54	15	Did not advance	
Arantxa Ramos	400 m freestyle	4:16.52	23	—N/a		Did not advance	
Erika Villaécija	400 m freestyle	4:13.03	18	—N/a		Did not advance	
Erika Villaécija	800 m freestyle	8:33.61	7 Q	—N/a		8:29.04	5
Roser Vives	200 m butterfly	2:13.02	19	Did not advance			
Nina Zhivanevskaya	100 m backstroke	1:01.75	7 Q	1:01.19	5 Q	1:01.12	5
Melissa Caballero; Ana Belén Palomo; Laura Roca; Tatiana Rouba	4 × 100 m freestyle relay	3:47.47	14	—N/a		Did not advance	
Melissa Caballero; Arantxa Ramos; Tatiana Rouba; Erika Villaécija	4 × 200 m freestyle relay	8:03.67	5 Q	—N/a		8:02.11	6
María Peláez; Sara Pérez; Tatiana Rouba; Nina Zhivanevskaya	4 × 100 m medley relay	4:06.90	7 Q	—N/a		4:07.61	7

== Synchronized swimming ==
Nine Spanish synchronized swimmers qualified a spot in the women's team.

Athlete	Event	Technical routine		Free routine (preliminary)			Free routine (final)		
Athlete	Event	Points	Rank	Points	Total (technical + free)	Rank	Points	Total (technical + free)	Rank
Gemma Mengual; Paola Tirados	Duet	47.917	4	48.167	96.084	4 Q	48.334	96.251	4
Raquel Corral; Andrea Fuentes; Tina Fuentes; Gemma Mengual; Ana Montero; Irina Rodríguez; Saray Serrano; Paola Tirados	Team	48.167	4	—N/a			48.500	97.167	4

== Table tennis ==
Spain has qualified one table tennis player.

Athlete	Event	Round 1	Round 2	Round 3	Round 4	Quarterfinals	Semifinals	Final / BM	
Athlete	Event	Opposition Result	Opposition Result	Opposition Result	Opposition Result	Opposition Result	Opposition Result	Opposition Result	Rank
He Zhiwen	Men's singles	Gionis (GRE); W 4–1	Błaszczyk (POL); L 1–4	Did not advance					

== Taekwondo ==
Four Spanish taekwondo jin qualified for the following events:

Athlete	Event	Round of 16	Quarterfinals	Semifinals	Repechage 1	Repechage 2	Final / BM	
Athlete	Event	Opposition Result	Opposition Result	Opposition Result	Opposition Result	Opposition Result	Opposition Result	Rank
Juan Antonio Ramos	Men's −58 kg	Go (PHI); W 7–6	Chu M-Y (TPE); L 1–9	Did not advance	Tlish (LBA); W WO	Nguyen (VIE); W 8–0	Bayoumi (EGY); L 1–7	4
Jon García	Men's +80 kg	Prerad (BIH); W 13–2	Moon D-S (KOR); L 2–6	Did not advance	Sagindykov (KAZ); L 5–5 SUP	Did not advance		7
Brigitte Yagüe	Women's −49 kg	Boorapolchai (THA); L 5–9	Did not advance					
Sonia Reyes	Women's −57 kg	Uścińska (POL); W 11–2	Jang J-W (KOR); L 2–3	Did not advance	Bah (CIV); W 5–0	Sukkhongdumnoen (THA); W 6–3	Salazar (MEX); L 1–2	4

== Tennis ==
Ten Spanish tennis players (five men and five women) qualified for the following events:

Men

Athlete	Event	Round of 64	Round of 32	Round of 16	Quarterfinals	Semifinals	Final / BM	
Athlete	Event	Opposition Score	Opposition Score	Opposition Score	Opposition Score	Opposition Score	Opposition Score	Rank
Juan Carlos Ferrero	Singles	Arazi (MAR); W 6–3, 6–1	Fish (USA); L 6–4, 6–7^{(5–7)}, 4–6	Did not advance				
Feliciano López	Singles	Söderling (SWE); W 6–3, 3–6, 6–4	Safin (RUS); W 7–6^{(7–4)}, 6–3	Grosjean (FRA); L 7–6^{(7–4)}, 4–6, 0–6	Did not advance			
Carlos Moyá	Singles	Enqvist (SWE); W 7–6^{(10–8)}, 6–7^{(7–9)}, 9–7	Rochus (BEL); W 6–0, 7–6^{(7–3)}	Karlović (CRO); W 4–6, 7–6^{(7–3)}, 6–4	Massú (CHI); L 2–6, 5–7	Did not advance		
Tommy Robredo	Singles	Ouahab (ALG); W 6–3, 6–4	Santoro (FRA); W 1–6, 6–3, 6–4	Berdych (CZE); L 6–7^{(2–7)}, 6–4, 6–8	Did not advance			
Feliciano López; Tommy Robredo	Doubles	—N/a	Etlis / Rodríguez (ARG); L 3–6, 4–6	Did not advance				
Carlos Moyá; Rafael Nadal	Doubles	—N/a	Sá / Saretta (BRA); L 6–7^{(6–8)}, 1–6	Did not advance				

Women

Athlete	Event	Round of 64	Round of 32	Round of 16	Quarterfinals	Semifinals	Final / BM	
Athlete	Event	Opposition Score	Opposition Score	Opposition Score	Opposition Score	Opposition Score	Opposition Score	Rank
Conchita Martínez	Singles	Mauresmo (FRA); L 1–6, 4–6	Did not advance					
Anabel Medina Garrigues	Singles	Pierce (FRA); L 3–6, 5–7	Did not advance					
Magüi Serna	Singles	Myskina (RUS); L 0–6, 1–6	Did not advance					
Conchita Martínez; Virginia Ruano Pascual	Doubles	—N/a	Mandula / Nagy (HUN); W 6–4, 6–0	Garbin / Vinci (ITA); W 6–3, 6–3	Yan Z / Zheng J (CHN); W 6–1, 6–1	Asagoe / Sugiyama (JPN); W 6–3, 6–0	Li T / Sun Tt (CHN); L 3–6, 3–6	2nd place, silver medalist(s)
Anabel Medina Garrigues; Arantxa Sánchez Vicario	Doubles	—N/a	Suárez / Tarabini (ARG); L 7–6^{(10–8)}, 5–7, 2–6	Did not advance				

== Triathlon ==
Six Spanish triathletes qualified for the following events.

Athlete	Event	Swim (1.5 km)	Trans 1	Bike (40 km)	Trans 2	Run (10 km)	Total Time	Rank
Eneko Llanos	Men's	18:18	0:18	1:02:36	0:21	33:58	1:54:52.37	20
Xavier Llobet	Men's	18:15	0:19	1:05:44	0:26	Did not finish		
Iván Raña	Men's	18:08	0:17	1:02:46	0:21	34:50	1:55:44.27	23
Ana Burgos	Women's	20:36	0:20	1:09:52	0:24	35:34	2:06:02.36	7
Pilar Hidalgo	Women's	19:08	0:21	1:11:16	0:23	37:13	2:07:37.34	13
Ainhoa Murúa	Women's	19:37	0:19	1:10:48	0:23	39:02	2:09:27.91	24

== Volleyball ==
=== Beach ===
Athlete	Event	Preliminary round	Standing	Round of 16	Quarterfinals	Semifinals	Final	
Athlete	Event	Opposition Score	Standing	Opposition Score	Opposition Score	Opposition Score	Opposition Score	Rank
Javier Bosma; Pablo Herrera	Men's	Pool C Berger – Gosch (AUT); W 2 – 0 (21–14, 21–13); M Laciga – P Laciga (SUI); W 2 – 1 (21–19, 17–21, 15–9); Gartmayer – Nowotny (AUT); W 2 – 1 (21–16, 19–21, 15–11)	1 Q	Berg – Dahl (SWE); W 2 – 0 (21–16, 21–17)	Child – Heese (CAN); W 2 – 1 (22–24, 21–19, 18–16)	Prosser – Williams (AUS); W 2 – 0 (21–18, 21–18)	Rego – Santos (BRA); L 0 – 2 (16–21, 15–21)	2nd place, silver medalist(s)

== Water polo ==
=== Men's tournament ===
Roster

The following is the Spanish roster in the men's water polo tournament of the 2004 Summer Olympics.

Head coach: Joan Jane

№	Name	Pos.	Height	Weight	Date of birth	2004 club
1	Jesús Rollán (C)	GK	1.87 m (6 ft 2 in)	87 kg (192 lb)	4 April 1968	(Spain) CN Sabadell
2	Ángel Andreo	GK	1.91 m (6 ft 3 in)	83 kg (183 lb)	3 December 1972	(Spain) CN Atlètic-Barceloneta
3	Sergi Pedrerol	D	1.90 m (6 ft 3 in)	78 kg (172 lb)	16 December 1969	(Spain) CN Sabadell
4	Gustavo Marcos	CB	1.80 m (5 ft 11 in)	95 kg (209 lb)	23 December 1972	(Spain) CN Sabadell
5	Guillermo Molina	CB	1.82 m (6 ft 0 in)	90 kg (200 lb)	16 March 1984	(Spain) CN Barcelona
6	Xavier García	CB	1.88 m (6 ft 2 in)	87 kg (192 lb)	5 January 1984	(Spain) CN Atlètic-Barceloneta
7	Gabriel Hernández	D	1.85 m (6 ft 1 in)	84 kg (185 lb)	2 January 1975	(Spain) CN Atlètic-Barceloneta
8	Iván Moro	CB	1.86 m (6 ft 1 in)	84 kg (185 lb)	25 December 1974	(Spain) CN Atlètic-Barceloneta
9	Daniel Ballart	CB	1.78 m (5 ft 10 in)	73 kg (161 lb)	17 March 1973	(Spain) CN Sabadell
10	Salvador Gómez	CB	1.94 m (6 ft 4 in)	96 kg (212 lb)	11 March 1968	(Spain) Aguas de Valencia
11	Iván Pérez	CF	1.90 m (6 ft 3 in)	88 kg (194 lb)	29 June 1971	(Spain) CN Barcelona
12	Javier Sánchez	CF	1.93 m (6 ft 4 in)	85 kg (187 lb)	16 June 1975	(Spain) CN Atlètic-Barceloneta
13	Daniel Moro	D	1.88 m (6 ft 2 in)	86 kg (190 lb)	8 August 1973	(Spain) CN Atlètic-Barceloneta

Group play

Pos	Team	Pld	W	D	L	GF	GA	GD	Pts	Qualification
1	Greece	5	4	0	1	43	27	+16	8	Qualified for the semifinals
2	Germany	5	3	1	1	40	28	+12	7	Qualified for the quarterfinals
3	Spain	5	3	0	2	35	31	+4	6	Qualified for the quarterfinals
4	Italy	5	3	0	2	39	24	+15	6	
5	Australia	5	1	1	3	37	35	+2	4	
6	Egypt	5	0	0	5	18	67	−49	0	

15 August 2004; 17:45	Italy	4–5	Spain	Athens Olympic Aquatic Centre; Referees: Margeta (SLO), Tomic (CRO)
15 August 2004; 17:45	Score by quarters: 1-2, 1-3, 0-0, 2-0			Athens Olympic Aquatic Centre; Referees: Margeta (SLO), Tomic (CRO)
15 August 2004; 17:45	4 players with 1	Goals	5 players with 1	Athens Olympic Aquatic Centre; Referees: Margeta (SLO), Tomic (CRO)

17 August 2004; 21:00	Greece	8–5	Spain	Athens Olympic Aquatic Centre; Referees: Kratochvil (SVK), Margeta (SLO)
17 August 2004; 21:00	Score by quarters: 2-1, 4-1, 1-2, 1-1			Athens Olympic Aquatic Centre; Referees: Kratochvil (SVK), Margeta (SLO)
17 August 2004; 21:00	Chatzitheodorou, Schizas 2	Goals	Five players with 1	Athens Olympic Aquatic Centre; Referees: Kratochvil (SVK), Margeta (SLO)

19 August 2004; 16:30	Spain	8–4	Australia	Athens Olympic Aquatic Centre; Referees: Balfanbayev (KAZ), Tomic (CRO)
19 August 2004; 16:30	Score by quarters: 2-1, 3-1, 1-1, 2-1			Athens Olympic Aquatic Centre; Referees: Balfanbayev (KAZ), Tomic (CRO)
19 August 2004; 16:30	3 players with 2	Goals	4 players with 1	Athens Olympic Aquatic Centre; Referees: Balfanbayev (KAZ), Tomic (CRO)

21 August 2004; 16:30	Germany	11–5	Spain	Athens Olympic Aquatic Centre; Referees: Tulga (TUR), Brguljan (SCG)
21 August 2004; 16:30	Score by quarters: 3-2, 2-0, 4-3, 2-0			Athens Olympic Aquatic Centre; Referees: Tulga (TUR), Brguljan (SCG)
21 August 2004; 16:30	Wollthan 3	Goals	5 players with 1	Athens Olympic Aquatic Centre; Referees: Tulga (TUR), Brguljan (SCG)

23 August 2004; 17:00	Spain	12–4	Egypt	Athens Olympic Aquatic Centre; Referees: Valcarce (ARG), Zhong (CHN)
23 August 2004; 17:00	Score by quarters: 4-1, 3-0, 2-1, 3-2			Athens Olympic Aquatic Centre; Referees: Valcarce (ARG), Zhong (CHN)
23 August 2004; 17:00	Hernández, Gómez 3	Goals	El-Helw 2	Athens Olympic Aquatic Centre; Referees: Valcarce (ARG), Zhong (CHN)

Quarterfinals

25 August 2004; 18:15	Serbia and Montenegro	7–5	Spain	Athens Olympic Aquatic Centre; Referees: Tulga (TUR), Chaney (USA)
25 August 2004; 18:15	Score by quarters: 3-2, 2-0, 0-2, 2-1			Athens Olympic Aquatic Centre; Referees: Tulga (TUR), Chaney (USA)
25 August 2004; 18:15	Šapić 3	Goals	5 players with 1	Athens Olympic Aquatic Centre; Referees: Tulga (TUR), Chaney (USA)

5th place match

29 August 2004; 12:00	Germany	6–4	Spain	Athens Olympic Aquatic Centre; Referees: Stavropoulos (GRE), Bookelman (NED)
29 August 2004; 12:00	Score by quarters: 2-2, 3-1, 0-0, 1-1			Athens Olympic Aquatic Centre; Referees: Stavropoulos (GRE), Bookelman (NED)
29 August 2004; 12:00	Nossek 2	Goals	Hernández 2	Athens Olympic Aquatic Centre; Referees: Stavropoulos (GRE), Bookelman (NED)

== Weightlifting ==
Two Spanish weightlifters qualified for the following events:

Athlete	Event	Snatch		Clean & Jerk		Total	Rank
Athlete	Event	Result	Rank	Result	Rank	Total	Rank
Santiago Martínez	Men's −94 kg	180	=7	207.5	=10	382.5	9
Gema Peris	Women's −48 kg	77.5	=8	90	=12	167.5	12

== Wrestling ==
Key:

- VT – Victory by Fall.
- PP – Decision by Points – the loser with technical points.
- PO – Decision by Points – the loser without technical points.

Men's Greco-Roman

Athlete	Event	Elimination Pool			Quarterfinal	Semifinal	Final / BM	
Athlete	Event	Opposition Result	Opposition Result	Rank	Opposition Result	Opposition Result	Opposition Result	Rank
Moisés Sánchez	−66 kg	Begaliev (KGZ); L 1–3 ^{PP}	Zeidvand (IRI); L 1–3 ^{PP}	3	Did not advance			16
José Alberto Recuero	−74 kg	Khalimov (KAZ); L 1–3 ^{PP}	Manasherov (ISR); W 5–0 ^{VT}	2	Did not advance			9

== See also ==
- Spain at the 2004 Summer Paralympics
- Spain at the 2005 Mediterranean Games
