= Serbia and Montenegro at the 2004 Summer Olympics =

- IOC code: SCG
- NOC: Olympic Committee of Serbia and Montenegro

in Athens
- Competitors: 85 in 14 sports
- Flag bearer: Dejan Bodiroga
- Medals Ranked 61st: Gold 0 Silver 2 Bronze 0 Total 2

Summer Olympics appearances (overview)
- 1996; 2000; 2004

Other related appearances
- Yugoslavia (1920–1992 W); Independent Olympic Participants (1992 S); Montenegro (2008–pres.); Serbia (1912, 2008–pres.); Kosovo (2016–pres.)

Serbia and Montenegro competed at the 2004 Summer Olympics in Athens, Greece, from 13 to 29 August 2004. Previously known as the Federal Republic of Yugoslavia, this was the nation's third and last joint appearance at the Summer Olympics before Serbia and Montenegro became separated independent states in 2006. The Olympic Committee of Serbia and Montenegro sent a total of 85 athletes to the Games, 78 men and 7 women, to compete in 14 sports. Men's basketball, football, volleyball, and water polo were the only team-based sports in which Serbia and Montenegro had its representation at these Games. There was only a single competitor in road cycling, judo, tennis, and wrestling.

The Serbia and Montenegro team featured several Olympic medalists from Sydney, including the reigning men's volleyball champions (led by team captain Vladimir Grbić), and pistol shooter Jasna Šekarić, who became the first Serbian athlete to compete in five Olympic Games under three different banners (the other were SFR Yugoslavia and Independent Olympic Participants). Meanwhile, four Serbia and Montenegro athletes had made their fourth Olympic appearance: high jumper Dragutin Topić, shot putter Dragan Perić (the oldest of the team at age 40), rifle shooter Stevan Pletikosić, and table tennis player Slobodan Grujić. Basketball team captain Dejan Bodiroga was appointed by the committee to become the nation's flag bearer in the opening ceremony.

Serbia and Montenegro ended its last Olympic journey as a joint nation in Athens with two Olympic silver medals from Sekaric and the men's water polo team (led by Viktor Jelenić). These would be the last Summer Games in which athletes from Montenegro and Serbia participated as Yugoslavia as they both competed separately in the 2008 Olympics

== Medalists ==
Medal	Name	Sport	Event	Date
Silver	Jasna Šekarić	Shooting	Women's 10 m air pistol	August 15
Silver	Serbia and Montenegro men's national water polo team: Vladimir Vujasinović; Denis Šefik; Petar Trbojević; Vanja Udovičić; Slobodan Nikić; Aleksandar Šapić; Dejan Savić; Viktor Jelenić; Predrag Jokić; Nikola Kuljača; Aleksandar Ćirić; Vladimir Gojković; Danilo Ikodinović	Water polo	Men's tournament	August 29

== Athletics ==
Serbia and Montenegrin athletes have so far achieved qualifying standards in the following athletics events (up to a maximum of 3 athletes in each event at the 'A' Standard, and 1 at the 'B' Standard).

Key

- Note–Ranks given for track events are within the athlete's heat only
- Q = Qualified for the next round
- q = Qualified for the next round as a fastest loser or, in field events, by position without achieving the qualifying target
- NR = National record
- N/A = Round not applicable for the event
- Bye = Athlete not required to compete in round

Men
Track & road events

Athlete	Event	Heat		Quarterfinal		Semifinal		Final	
Athlete	Event	Result	Rank	Result	Rank	Result	Rank	Result	Rank
Predrag Filipović	20 km walk	—N/a						1:31:35	39
Nenad Lončar	110 m hurdles	14.02	8	Did not advance					
Aleksandar Raković	50 km walk	—N/a						4:02:06	23

Field events

Athlete	Event	Qualification		Final	
Athlete	Event	Distance	Position	Distance	Position
Dragan Perić	Shot put	18.91	32	Did not advance	
Dragutin Topić	High jump	2.28	9 Q	2.29	10

Women
Track & road events

Athlete	Event	Final	
Athlete	Event	Result	Rank
Olivera Jevtić	Marathon	2:31:15	6

Field events

Athlete	Event	Qualification		Final	
Athlete	Event	Distance	Position	Distance	Position
Dragana Tomašević	Discus throw	54.44	38	Did not advance	

== Basketball ==
=== Men's tournament ===
Roster

The following is the Serbia and Montenegro roster in the men's basketball tournament of the 2004 Summer Olympics.

Serbia and Montenegro men's national basketball team – 2004 Summer Olympics roster
Players
Coaches

Pos.	No.	Name	Age – Date of birth	Height	Club	Ctr.
G	4	Dejan Bodiroga (C)	31 – 2 March 1973	2.03 m (6 ft 8 in)	FC Barcelona	(Spain)
C	5	Petar Popović	25 – 28 July 1979	2.11 m (6 ft 11 in)	Hemofarm	(Serbia and Montenegro)
C	6	Đuro Ostojić	28 – 17 February 1976	2.07 m (6 ft 9 in)	Partizan	(Serbia and Montenegro)
F	7	Vladimir Radmanović	23 – 19 November 1980	2.06 m (6 ft 9 in)	Seattle SuperSonics	(United States)
G	8	Igor Rakočević	26 – 29 March 1978	1.94 m (6 ft 4 in)	Crvena Zvezda	(Serbia and Montenegro)
G	9	Vlado Šćepanović	28 – 13 November 1975	1.96 m (6 ft 5 in)	Partizan	(Serbia and Montenegro)
G	10	Vule Avdalović	22 – 24 November 1981	1.94 m (6 ft 4 in)	Partizan	(Serbia and Montenegro)
C	11	Predrag Drobnjak	28 – 27 October 1975	2.07 m (6 ft 9 in)	Los Angeles Clippers	(United States)
C	12	Nenad Krstić	21 – 25 July 1983	2.14 m (7 ft 0 in)	New Jersey Nets	(United States)
G	13	Miloš Vujanić	23 – 13 November 1980	1.92 m (6 ft 4 in)	Skipper Bologna	(Italy)
C	14	Dejan Tomašević	31 – 6 May 1973	2.08 m (6 ft 10 in)	Pamesa Valencia	(Spain)
F	15	Aleksandar Pavlović	20 – 15 November 1983	2.01 m (6 ft 7 in)	Utah Jazz	(United States)

Head coach

- (Serbia and Montenegro) Željko Obradović

Assistant coach(es)

- (Serbia and Montenegro) Dragan Šakota

Legend

- (C) Team captain
- nat field describes country
  of last club
  before the tournament
- Age as of August 13, 2004

Group play

Pos	Team	Pld	W	L	PF	PA	PD	Pts	Qualification
1	Spain	5	5	0	405	349	+56	10	Quarterfinals
2	Italy	5	3	2	371	341	+30	8 (Note: Head-to-head record: Italy 1–0 Argentina)	Quarterfinals
3	Argentina	5	3	2	414	396	+18	8	Quarterfinals
4	China	5	2	3	303	382	−79	7	Quarterfinals
5	New Zealand	5	1	4	399	413	−14	6 (Note: Head-to-head record: New Zealand 1–0 Serbia and Montenegro)	9th place playoff
6	Serbia and Montenegro	5	1	4	377	388	−11	6	11th place playoff

Source: FIBA archive
Rules for classification: 1) points; 2) head-to-head points; 3) head-to-head goal average; 4) head-to-head number of points scored.
Notes:

15 August 2004
16:45

Argentina	83–82	Serbia and Montenegro
Scoring by quarter: 27–15, 22–24, 12–20, 22–23
Pts: Ginóbili 27; Rebs: Wolkowyski 6 Asts: Ginóbili 3		Pts: Radmanović 21; Rebs: Dejan Tomašević 10; Asts: 3 players, 1 each

Olympic Indoor Hall, Athens
Attendance: 10,500
Referees: Virginijus Dovidavicius (LTU), José Carrión (PUR)

17 August 2004
16:45

Serbia and Montenegro	74–72	Italy
Scoring by quarter: 16–17, 20–19, 19–14, 19–22
Pts: Rakočević 19; Rebs: Tomašević 12; Asts: Tomašević 5		Pts: Bulleri 15; Rebs: Chiacig, Radulović 5 each Asts: Bulleri, Pozzecco 2 each

Helliniko Indoor Arena, Athens
Attendance: 12,500
Referees:
José Ronfini (Mexico)
Sean Corbin(United States)

19 August 2004
9:00

Serbia and Montenegro	87–90	New Zealand
Scoring by quarter: 20–22, 24–17, 22–16, 21–35
Pts: Bodiroga 25; Rebs: Bodiroga 6 Asts: Rakočević 2		Pts: Penney 15; Rebs: Marks 5 Asts: Dickel 6

Helliniko Indoor Arena, Athens
Attendance: 4,200
Referees:
Jorge Vazquez (Puerto Rico)
Philippe Leemann (Switzerland)

21 August 2004
11:15

Spain	76–68	Serbia and Montenegro
Scoring by quarter: 18–14, 13–17, 20–21, 25–16
Pts: Calderón 15; Rebs: Reyes 6 Asts: Garbajosa, Navarro 3 each		Pts: Bodiroga 14; Rebs: Tomašević 9 Asts: Rakočević 3

Helliniko Indoor Arena, Athens
Attendance: 10,350
Referees:
Renato Santos (Brazil)
José Monfini (Mexico)

23 August 2004
16:45

Serbia and Montenegro	66–67	China
Scoring by quarter: 21–16, 13–15, 20–20, 12–16
Pts: Drobnjak 17; Rebs: Tomašević 11; Asts: Tomašević 4		Pts: Yao Ming 27; Rebs: Yao Ming 13; Asts: Liu Wei 3

Helliniko Indoor Arena, Athens
Attendance: 11,150
Referees:
Christos Christodoulou (Greece)
Michael Aylen (Australia)

Classification match (11th–12th place)

24 August 2004
14:30

11th place

Serbia and Montenegro	85–62	Angola
Scoring by quarter: 18–10, 16–15, 27–19, 24–18
Pts: Šćepanović 18; Rebs: Krstić 12; Asts: Šćepanović 4		Pts: Monteiro 26; Rebs: Moussa 7 Asts: Almeida, Monteiro 2 each

Helliniko Indoor Arena, Athens
Attendance: 3,625
Referees: Vicente Bulto (ESP), Alejandro Chiti (ARG)

== Canoeing ==
=== Sprint ===
Athlete	Event	Heats		Semifinals		Final	
Athlete	Event	Time	Rank	Time	Rank	Time	Rank
Ognjen Filipović; Dragan Zorić	Men's K-2 500 m	1:31.985	3 q	1:32.150	4	Did not advance	
Ognjen Filipović; Dragan Zorić	Men's K-2 1000 m	3:19.299	6 q	3:58.793	8	Did not advance	

Qualification Legend: Q = Qualify to final; q = Qualify to semifinal

== Cycling ==
=== Road ===
Athlete	Event	Time	Rank
Ivan Stević	Men's road race	Did not finish	

== Football ==
=== Men's tournament ===
Roster

The following is the Serbia and Montenegrin squad in the men's football tournament of the 2004 Summer Olympics.

Head coach: Vladimir Petrović

No.	Pos.	Player	Date of birth (age)	Caps	Goals	2004 club
1	GK	Nikola Milojević	16 April 1981 (aged 23)	7	0	(Football Association of Serbia and Montenegro) FK Hajduk Kula
2	DF	Milan Biševac	31 August 1983 (aged 20)	4	0	(Football Association of Serbia and Montenegro) Red Star Belgrade
3	DF	Bojan Neziri	26 February 1982 (aged 22)	5	0	(Ukrainian Association of Football) Metalurh Donetsk
4	DF	Milan Stepanov	2 April 1983 (aged 21)	0	0	(Football Association of Serbia and Montenegro) FK Vojvodina
5	DF	Đorđe Jokić	20 January 1981 (aged 23)	19	1	(Football Association of Serbia and Montenegro) OFK Belgrade
6	DF	Marko Baša	29 December 1982 (aged 21)	11	1	(Football Association of Serbia and Montenegro) OFK Belgrade
7	MF	Dejan Milovanović	21 January 1984 (aged 20)	13	3	(Football Association of Serbia and Montenegro) Red Star Belgrade
8	MF	Goran Lovré	23 March 1982 (aged 22)	11	1	(Royal Belgian Football Association) Anderlecht
9	FW	Andrija Delibašić	24 April 1981 (aged 23)	24	7	(Royal Spanish Football Federation) Mallorca
10	FW	Simon Vukčević	29 January 1986 (aged 18)	3	1	(Football Association of Serbia and Montenegro) FK Partizan
11	MF	Igor Matić	22 June 1981 (aged 23)	17	4	(Football Association of Serbia and Montenegro) OFK Belgrade
12	MF	Branimir Petrović	26 June 1982 (aged 22)	5	2	(Football Association of Serbia and Montenegro) FK Partizan
13	DF	Marko Lomić	13 September 1983 (aged 20)	0	0	(Football Association of Serbia and Montenegro) FK Železnik
14	DF	Branko Lazarević	14 May 1984 (aged 20)	0	0	(Football Association of Serbia and Montenegro) FK Vojvodina
15	MF	Miloš Krasić	1 November 1984 (aged 19)	7	1	(Russian Football Union) CSKA Moscow
16	FW	Nikola Nikezić	13 June 1981 (aged 23)	3	0	(Football Association of Serbia and Montenegro) FK Sutjeska
17	FW	Srđan Radonjić	8 May 1981 (aged 23)	2	1	(Football Association of Serbia and Montenegro) FK Partizan
18	GK	Aleksandar Čanović	18 February 1983 (aged 21)	0	0	(Football Association of Serbia and Montenegro) FK Vojvodina

* Over-aged player.

Group play

Pos	Team	Pld	W	D	L	GF	GA	GD	Pts	Qualification
1	Argentina	3	3	0	0	9	0	+9	9	Qualified for the quarterfinals
2	Australia	3	1	1	1	6	3	+3	4	Qualified for the quarterfinals
3	Tunisia	3	1	1	1	4	5	−1	4	
4	Serbia and Montenegro	3	0	0	3	3	14	−11	0	

11 August 2004
20:30

Argentina	6 – 0	Serbia and Montenegro
Delgado 11'; C. González 17'; Tevez 42', 43'; Heinze 74'; Rosales 77'	Report

Pampeloponnisiako Stadium, Patras
Attendance: 14,675
Referee: Carlos Batres (Guatemala)

14 August 2004
20:30

Serbia and Montenegro	1 – 5	Australia
Radonjić 72'	Report	Cahill 11'; Aloisi 45+1', 57'; Elrich 60', 86'

Pankritio Stadium, Heraklion
Attendance: 8,857
Referee: Subkhiddin Mohd Salleh (Malaysia)

17 August 2004
20:30

Serbia and Montenegro	2 – 3	Tunisia
Krasić 70'; Vukčević 87'	Report	Clayton 41'; Jedidi 83' (pen.); Zitouni 89'

Pampeloponnisiako Stadium, Patras
Attendance: 5,512
Referee: Charles Ariiotima (Tahiti)

== Judo ==
Serbia and Montenegro has qualified a single judoka.

Athlete	Event	Round of 32	Round of 16	Quarterfinals	Semifinals	Repechage 1	Repechage 2	Repechage 3	Final / BM	
Athlete	Event	Opposition Result	Opposition Result	Opposition Result	Opposition Result	Opposition Result	Opposition Result	Opposition Result	Opposition Result	Rank
Miloš Mijalković	Men's −66 kg	Kalikulov (UZB); W 0101–0100	Kipshakbayev (KAZ); L 0001–0002	Did not advance						

== Rowing ==
Serbia and Montenegrin rowers qualified the following boats:

Men

Athlete	Event	Heats		Repechage		Semifinals		Final	
Athlete	Event	Time	Rank	Time	Rank	Time	Rank	Time	Rank
Mladen Stegić; Nikola Stojić	Pair	6:58.11	2 SA/B	Bye		6:27.50	2 FA	6:39.74	5
Nenad Babović; Goran Nedeljković; Miloš Tomić; Veljko Urošević	Lightweight four	5:56.12	4 R	5:54.27	2 SA/B	6:00.07	5 FB	6:19.00	7

Qualification Legend: FA=Final A (medal); FB=Final B (non-medal); FC=Final C (non-medal); FD=Final D (non-medal); FE=Final E (non-medal); FF=Final F (non-medal); SA/B=Semifinals A/B; SC/D=Semifinals C/D; SE/F=Semifinals E/F; R=Repechage

== Shooting ==
Three Serbia and Montenegrin shooters (two men and one woman) qualified to compete in the following events:

Men

Athlete	Event	Qualification		Final	
Athlete	Event	Points	Rank	Points	Rank
Stevan Pletikošić	10 m air rifle	586	=39	Did not advance	
Stevan Pletikošić	50 m rifle prone	586	=42	Did not advance	
Stevan Pletikošić	50 m rifle 3 positions	1153	28	Did not advance	
Andrija Zlatić	10 m air pistol	579	13	Did not advance	
Andrija Zlatić	50 m pistol	546	32	Did not advance	

Women

Athlete	Event	Qualification		Final	
Athlete	Event	Points	Rank	Points	Rank
Jasna Šekarić	10 m air pistol	387	1 Q	483.3 (9.4)	2nd place, silver medalist(s)
Jasna Šekarić	25 m pistol	579	9	Did not advance	

== Swimming ==
Serbia and Montenegrin swimmers earned qualifying standards in the following events (up to a maximum of 2 swimmers in each event at the A-standard time, and 1 at the B-standard time):

Men

Athlete	Event	Heat		Semifinal		Final	
Athlete	Event	Time	Rank	Time	Rank	Time	Rank
Igor Beretić	100 m backstroke	59.38	40	Did not advance			
Milorad Čavić	50 m freestyle	23.05	31	Did not advance			
Milorad Čavić	100 m freestyle	49.74	19	Did not advance			
Milorad Čavić	100 m butterfly	52.44	4 Q	53.12	16	Did not advance	
Igor Erhartić	200 m freestyle	1:54.21	48	Did not advance			
Vladan Marković	200 m butterfly	2:04.77	31	Did not advance			
Mladen Tepavčević	100 m breaststroke	1:03.52	29	Did not advance			

Women

Athlete	Event	Heat		Semifinal		Final	
Athlete	Event	Time	Rank	Time	Rank	Time	Rank
Marina Kuč	100 m breaststroke	1:11.27	22	Did not advance			
Marina Kuč	200 m breaststroke	2:30.39	13 Q	2:31.77	15	Did not advance	
Miroslava Najdanovski	50 m freestyle	27.18	43	Did not advance			

== Table tennis ==
Three Serbia and Montenegrin table tennis players qualified for the following events.

Athlete	Event	Round 1	Round 2	Round 3	Round 4	Quarterfinals	Semifinals	Final / BM	
Athlete	Event	Opposition Result	Opposition Result	Opposition Result	Opposition Result	Opposition Result	Opposition Result	Opposition Result	Rank
Slobodan Grujić	Men's singles	Bye	Liu S (ARG); L 1–4	Did not advance					
Aleksandar Karakašević	Men's singles	Al-Harbi (KSA); W 4–0	Huang (CAN); W 4–2	Waldner (SWE); L 2–4	Did not advance				
Slobodan Grujić; Aleksandar Karakašević	Men's doubles	—N/a	Bye		Kito / Tasaki (JPN); W 4–1	Ko L C / Li C (HKG); L 1–4	Did not advance		
Silvija Erdelji	Women's singles	Ben Kahia (TUN); W 4–0	Jing Jh (SIN); L 2–4	Did not advance					

== Tennis ==
Serbia nominated a female tennis player to compete in the tournament.

Athlete	Event	Round of 64	Round of 32	Round of 16	Quarterfinals	Semifinals	Final / BM	
Athlete	Event	Opposition Score	Opposition Score	Opposition Score	Opposition Score	Opposition Score	Opposition Score	Rank
Jelena Janković	Women's singles	Zuluaga (COL); L 4–6, 1–6	Did not advance					

== Volleyball ==
=== Men's tournament ===
Roster

The following is the Serbia and Montenegrin roster in the men's volleyball tournament of the 2004 Summer Olympics.

Head coach: Ljubomir Travica

№	Name	Date of birth	Height	Weight	Spike	Block	2004 club
2	Milan Vasić	2 September 1980	2.04 m (6 ft 8 in)	98 kg (216 lb)	355 cm (140 in)	330 cm (130 in)	(Italy) Pallavolo Loreto
4	Aleksandar Mitrović	24 September 1982	1.93 m (6 ft 4 in)	93 kg (205 lb)	350 cm (140 in)	324 cm (128 in)	(Serbia and Montenegro) Partizan Belgrade
6	Vladan Đorđević	10 January 1983	1.94 m (6 ft 4 in)	90 kg (200 lb)	332 cm (131 in)	318 cm (125 in)	(Serbia and Montenegro) Partizan Belgrade
7	Đula Mešter	3 April 1972	2.03 m (6 ft 8 in)	90 kg (200 lb)	346 cm (136 in)	325 cm (128 in)	(Serbia and Montenegro) Vojvodina Novolin
8	Vasa Mijić (L)	11 April 1973	1.86 m (6 ft 1 in)	80 kg (180 lb)	332 cm (131 in)	307 cm (121 in)	(Serbia and Montenegro) Vojvodina Novolin
9	Nikola Grbić (c)	6 September 1973	1.94 m (6 ft 4 in)	91 kg (201 lb)	346 cm (136 in)	320 cm (130 in)	(Italy) Copra Elior Piacenza
10	Vladimir Grbić	14 December 1970	1.93 m (6 ft 4 in)	87 kg (192 lb)	360 cm (140 in)	350 cm (140 in)	(Russia) Dynamo Moscow
12	Andrija Gerić	24 January 1977	2.03 m (6 ft 8 in)	101 kg (223 lb)	350 cm (140 in)	323 cm (127 in)	(Italy) Volley Lube
13	Goran Vujević	27 February 1973	1.92 m (6 ft 4 in)	94 kg (207 lb)	339 cm (133 in)	315 cm (124 in)	(Italy) Latina Volley
14	Ivan Miljković	13 September 1979	2.06 m (6 ft 9 in)	88 kg (194 lb)	354 cm (139 in)	333 cm (131 in)	(Italy) Volley Lube
15	Ivan Ilić	19 December 1976	1.94 m (6 ft 4 in)	85 kg (187 lb)	337 cm (133 in)	318 cm (125 in)	(Serbia and Montenegro) Budućnost Podgorica
17	Milan Marković	20 January 1980	2.03 m (6 ft 8 in)	101 kg (223 lb)	348 cm (137 in)	321 cm (126 in)	(Greece) Olympiacos

Group play

Pos	Team	Pld	W	L	Pts	SW	SL	SR	SPW	SPL	SPR	Qualification
1	Serbia and Montenegro	5	4	1	9	12	6	2.000	427	398	1.073	Quarterfinals
2	Greece	5	3	2	8	12	9	1.333	475	454	1.046	Quarterfinals
3	Argentina	5	3	2	8	12	9	1.333	471	457	1.031	Quarterfinals
4	Poland	5	3	2	8	10	9	1.111	422	419	1.007	Quarterfinals
5	France	5	2	3	7	8	10	0.800	405	394	1.028	
6	Tunisia	5	0	5	5	4	15	0.267	373	451	0.827	

Source: FIVB

15 August 2004; 09:00	Serbia and Montenegro	0–3	Poland	Peace and Friendship Stadium; Attendance: 2,000; Referees: Bela Hobor (HUN), Luciano Gaspari (ITA)
15 August 2004; 09:00	(21–25, 17–25, 16–25) result			Peace and Friendship Stadium; Attendance: 2,000; Referees: Bela Hobor (HUN), Luciano Gaspari (ITA)

17 August 2004; 11:25	France	0–3	Serbia and Montenegro	Peace and Friendship Stadium; Attendance: 1,000; Referees: Frank Leuthaeusser (GER), Bela Hobor (HUN)
17 August 2004; 11:25	(21–25, 28–30, 22–25) result			Peace and Friendship Stadium; Attendance: 1,000; Referees: Frank Leuthaeusser (GER), Bela Hobor (HUN)

19 August 2004; 16:00	Serbia and Montenegro	3–0	Tunisia	Peace and Friendship Stadium; Attendance: 3,430; Referees: Abdullah Al-Khelaifi (KSA), Valdir Dellaqua (BRA)
19 August 2004; 16:00	(25–16, 25–18, 25–21) result			Peace and Friendship Stadium; Attendance: 3,430; Referees: Abdullah Al-Khelaifi (KSA), Valdir Dellaqua (BRA)

21 August 2004; 16:10	Argentina	1–3	Serbia and Montenegro	Peace and Friendship Stadium; Attendance: 4,826; Referees: Fernando Nava (MEX), Ning Wang (CHN)
21 August 2004; 16:10	(25–21, 17–25, 21–25, 23–25) result			Peace and Friendship Stadium; Attendance: 4,826; Referees: Fernando Nava (MEX), Ning Wang (CHN)

23 August 2004; 19:30	Serbia and Montenegro	3–2	Greece	Peace and Friendship Stadium; Attendance: 9,415; Referees: Luciano Gaspari (ITA), Jarmo Salomen (FIN)
23 August 2004; 19:30	(21–25, 38–36, 25–13, 23–25, 15–12) result			Peace and Friendship Stadium; Attendance: 9,415; Referees: Luciano Gaspari (ITA), Jarmo Salomen (FIN)

Quarterfinals

25 August 2004; 14:00	Serbia and Montenegro	1–3	Russia	Peace and Friendship Stadium; Attendance: 8,850; Referees: Jarmo Salonen (FIN), Frank Leuthaeusser (GER)
25 August 2004; 14:00	(27–29, 25–23, 25–27, 26–28) result			Peace and Friendship Stadium; Attendance: 8,850; Referees: Jarmo Salonen (FIN), Frank Leuthaeusser (GER)

== Water polo ==
=== Men's tournament ===
Roster

The following is the Serbia and Montenegrin roster in the men's water polo tournament of the 2004 Summer Olympics.

Head coach: Nenad Manojlović

№	Name	Pos.	Height	Weight	Date of birth	2004 club
1	Denis Šefik	GK	2.03 m (6 ft 8 in)	96 kg (212 lb)	20 September 1976	(Serbia and Montenegro) VK Partizan
2	Petar Trbojević	D	1.97 m (6 ft 6 in)	94 kg (207 lb)	9 September 1973	(Spain) CN Atlètic-Barceloneta
3	Slobodan Nikić	CF	1.96 m (6 ft 5 in)	94 kg (207 lb)	25 January 1983	(Serbia and Montenegro) PVK Jadran
4	Vanja Udovičić	D	1.94 m (6 ft 4 in)	96 kg (212 lb)	12 September 1982	(Serbia and Montenegro) PVK Jadran
5	Dejan Savić	CB	1.94 m (6 ft 4 in)	104 kg (229 lb)	24 April 1975	(Italy) Pro Recco
6	Danilo Ikodinović	D	1.88 m (6 ft 2 in)	87 kg (192 lb)	4 October 1976	(Italy) Pro Recco
7	Viktor Jelenić	CF	2.03 m (6 ft 8 in)	104 kg (229 lb)	31 October 1970	(Italy) Rari Nantes Savona
8	Vladimir Gojković	D	1.93 m (6 ft 4 in)	91 kg (201 lb)	29 January 1982	(Serbia and Montenegro) PVK Jadran
9	Aleksandar Ćirić	D	1.94 m (6 ft 4 in)	8,891 kg (19,601 lb)	31 December 1977	(Italy) Leonessa Brescia
10	Aleksandar Šapić	D	1.91 m (6 ft 3 in)	96 kg (212 lb)	1 June 1978	(Italy) Rari Nantes Savona
11	Vladimir Vujasinović (C)	CB	1.96 m (6 ft 5 in)	91 kg (201 lb)	1 June 1978	(Italy) Pro Recco
12	Predrag Jokić	CB	1.88 m (6 ft 2 in)	81 kg (179 lb)	3 February 1983	(Serbia and Montenegro) PVK Jadran
13	Nikola Kuljača	GK	1.97 m (6 ft 6 in)	94 kg (207 lb)	16 August 1974	(Italy) Telimar Palermo

Group play

Pos	Team	Pld	W	D	L	GF	GA	GD	Pts	Qualification
1	Hungary	5	5	0	0	44	27	+17	10	Qualified for the semifinals
2	Serbia and Montenegro	5	4	0	1	37	26	+11	8	Qualified for the quarterfinals
3	Russia	5	3	0	2	32	28	+4	6	Qualified for the quarterfinals
4	United States	5	2	0	3	32	37	−5	4	
5	Croatia	5	1	0	4	35	41	−6	2	
6	Kazakhstan	5	0	0	5	21	42	−21	0	

15 August 2004; 10:45	Serbia and Montenegro	4–6	Hungary	Athens Olympic Aquatic Centre; Referees: Borrell (ESP), Petronilli (ITA)
15 August 2004; 10:45	Score by quarters: 1-0, 2-3, 1-0, 0-3			Athens Olympic Aquatic Centre; Referees: Borrell (ESP), Petronilli (ITA)
15 August 2004; 10:45	Trbojević 2	Goals	Kiss 2	Athens Olympic Aquatic Centre; Referees: Borrell (ESP), Petronilli (ITA)

17 August 2004; 17:45	Russia	3–4	Serbia and Montenegro	Athens Olympic Aquatic Centre; Referees: Tulga (TUR), Petronilli (ITA)
17 August 2004; 17:45	Score by quarters: 1-1, 1-1, 0-1, 1-1			Athens Olympic Aquatic Centre; Referees: Tulga (TUR), Petronilli (ITA)
17 August 2004; 17:45	3 players with 1	Goals	Trbojević 2	Athens Olympic Aquatic Centre; Referees: Tulga (TUR), Petronilli (ITA)

19 August 2004; 09:30	Serbia and Montenegro	9–5	Kazakhstan	Athens Olympic Aquatic Centre; Referees: Legare (CAN), Sayed Mahmoud (EGY)
19 August 2004; 09:30	Score by quarters: 3-1, 2-1, 1-1, 3-2			Athens Olympic Aquatic Centre; Referees: Legare (CAN), Sayed Mahmoud (EGY)
19 August 2004; 09:30	Šapić 3	Goals	Zhilyayev 3	Athens Olympic Aquatic Centre; Referees: Legare (CAN), Sayed Mahmoud (EGY)

21 August 2004; 21:00	Serbia and Montenegro	11–8	Croatia	Athens Olympic Aquatic Centre; Referees: Petronilli (ITA), Bookelman (NED)
21 August 2004; 21:00	Score by quarters: 2-1, 4-2, 3-3, 2-2			Athens Olympic Aquatic Centre; Referees: Petronilli (ITA), Bookelman (NED)
21 August 2004; 21:00	Šapić 5	Goals	3 players with 2	Athens Olympic Aquatic Centre; Referees: Petronilli (ITA), Bookelman (NED)

23 August 2004; 21:00	United States	4–9	Serbia and Montenegro	Athens Olympic Aquatic Centre; Referees: Tulga (TUR), Borrell (ESP)
23 August 2004; 21:00	Score by quarters: 1-2, 1-2, 1-3, 1-2			Athens Olympic Aquatic Centre; Referees: Tulga (TUR), Borrell (ESP)
23 August 2004; 21:00	4 players with 1	Goals	Šapić 3	Athens Olympic Aquatic Centre; Referees: Tulga (TUR), Borrell (ESP)

Quarterfinals

25 August 2004; 18:15	Serbia and Montenegro	7–5	Spain	Athens Olympic Aquatic Centre; Referees: Tulga (TUR), Chaney (USA)
25 August 2004; 18:15	Score by quarters: 3-2, 2-0, 0-2, 2-1			Athens Olympic Aquatic Centre; Referees: Tulga (TUR), Chaney (USA)
25 August 2004; 18:15	Šapić 3	Goals	5 players with 1	Athens Olympic Aquatic Centre; Referees: Tulga (TUR), Chaney (USA)

Semifinals

27 August 2004; 21:00	Greece	3–7	Serbia and Montenegro	Olympic Aquatic Centre; Referees: Petronilli (ITA), Tulga (TUR)
27 August 2004; 21:00	Score by quarters: 1-2, 1-3, 1-1, 0-1			Olympic Aquatic Centre; Referees: Petronilli (ITA), Tulga (TUR)
27 August 2004; 21:00	Three players with 1	Goals	Jokić 2	Olympic Aquatic Centre; Referees: Petronilli (ITA), Tulga (TUR)

Gold medal final

29 August 2004; 17:30	Hungary	8–7	Serbia and Montenegro	Athens Olympic Aquatic Centre; Referees: Balfanbayev (KAZ), Petronilli (ITA)
29 August 2004; 17:30	Score by quarters: 2-3, 3-2, 0-2, 3-0			Athens Olympic Aquatic Centre; Referees: Balfanbayev (KAZ), Petronilli (ITA)
29 August 2004; 17:30	Kiss 4	Goals	Šapić 2	Athens Olympic Aquatic Centre; Referees: Balfanbayev (KAZ), Petronilli (ITA)

Won silver medal

== Wrestling ==
Key:

- VT - Victory by Fall.
- PP - Decision by Points - the loser with technical points.
- PO - Decision by Points - the loser without technical points.

Men's Greco-Roman

Athlete	Event	Elimination Pool			Quarterfinal	Semifinal	Final / BM	
Athlete	Event	Opposition Result	Opposition Result	Rank	Opposition Result	Opposition Result	Opposition Result	Rank
Davor Štefanek	−60 kg	Guzman (PER); L 1–3 ^{PP}	Sasamoto (JPN); L 1–3 ^{PP}	3	Did not advance			18

== See also ==
- Serbia and Montenegro at the 2004 Summer Paralympics
