= 2007 European Rowing Championships =

- Location: Poznań, Poland
- Dates: 21 and 23 September 2007

The 2007 European Rowing Championships were held at the Lake Malta in Poznań, Poland, between 21 and 23 September 2007. The European Rowing Championships had previously been held between 1893 and 1973, had become an international regatta in character, and were disestablished when the World Rowing Championships became an annual event. After a decision made in May 2006 by FISA, the European Championships were re-established with a focus on Europe only.

== Medal summary ==
=== Men ===
Event	Gold	Time	Silver	Time	Bronze	Time
M1x	Ralph Kreibich (AUT)	7:08.35	Mindaugas Griškonis (LTU)	7:09.68	Aleksandar Aleksandrov (BUL)	7:10.94
M2x	Greece (GRE); Ioannis Tsamis; Ioannis Christou	6:28.78	Croatia (CRO); Mario Vekić; Hrvoje Jurina	6:30.25	Germany (GER); Eric Knittel; Tim Bartels	6:30.70
M2-	Serbia (SRB); Goran Jagar; Nikola Stojić	6:44.30	Poland (POL); Piotr Hojka; Jarosław Godek	6:46.35	Italy (ITA); Giuseppe De Vita; Andrea Palmisano	6:46.66
LM2x	Hungary (HUN); Zsolt Hirling; Tamás Varga	6:36.99	Greece (GRE); Dimitrios Mouyios; Vasileios Polymeros	6:39.26	Czech Republic (CZE); Jan Vetešník; Ondřej Vetešník	6:45.75
M4x	Russia (RUS); Nikita Morgachyov; Aleksey Svirin; Aleksandr Kornilov; Nikael Bikua-Mfanse	5:56.06	Italy (ITA); Luca Ghezzi; Federico Gattinoni; Simone Venier; Simone Raineri	5:58.38	Belarus (BLR); Valery Radzevich; Dzianis Mihal; Stanislau Shcharbachenia; Andrei Pliashkou	6:01.79
M4-	Czech Republic (CZE); Michal Horváth; Jan Gruber; Milan Bruncvík; Karel Neffe Jr.	6:10.38	Germany (GER); Fokke Beckmann; Richard Schmidt; Sebastian Schmidt; Kristof Wilke	6:12.48	Greece (GRE); Georgios Tsiompanidis; Ioannis Tsilis; Georgios Tziallas; Pavlos Gavriilidis	6:13.50
LM4-	Italy (ITA); Jiri Vlcek; Catello Amarante; Salvatore Amitrano; Bruno Mascarenhas	6:17.84	Serbia (SRB); Veljko Urošević; Nenad Babović; Goran Nedeljković; Miloš Tomić	6:20.49	Russia (RUS); Ilya Ashchin; Aleksandr Savin; Aleksandr Zyuzin; Sergey Bukreyev	6:23.01
M8+	Czech Republic (CZE); Jakub Zof; Jakub Friedberger; Václav Chalupa; Jakub Makovička; Jan Schindler; Milan Doleček; Jakub Hanák; Ondřej Synek; Oldřich Hejdušek	5:44.80	Poland (POL); Michał Stawowski; Bogdan Zalewski; Sławomir Kruszkowski; Sebastian Kosiorek; Mikołaj Burda; Wojciech Gutorski; Piotr Buchalski; Rafał Hejmej; Daniel Trojanowski	5:47.93	Belarus (BLR); Andrei Tatarchuk; Dzianis Yakubau; Aleh Maskaliou; Andrei Dzemyanenka; Yauheni Nosau; Aliaksandr Dzernavy; Vadzim Lialin; Aliaksandr Kazubouski; Piotr Piatrynich	5:48.83

=== Women ===
Event	Gold	Time	Silver	Time	Bronze	Time
W1x	Rumyana Neykova (BUL)	7:36.23	Miroslava Knapková (CZE)	7:39.46	Frida Svensson (SWE)	7:49.29
W2x	Czech Republic (CZE); Gabriela Vařeková; Jitka Antošová	7:12.99	Finland (FIN); Sanna Stén; Minna Nieminen	7:14.68	Belarus (BLR); Hanna Nakhayeva; Volha Berazniova	7:17.58
W2-	Germany (GER); Lenka Wech; Maren Derlien	7:18.00	Russia (RUS); Vera Pochitaeva; Alevtina Podvyazkina	7:30.90	Romania (ROM); Adelina Cojocariu; Nicoleta Albu	7:34.60
LW2x	Greece (GRE); Chrysi Biskitzi; Alexandra Tsiavou	7:21.03	Poland (POL); Magdalena Kemnitz; Ilona Mokronowska	7:23.51	Italy (ITA); Erika Bello; Laura Milani	7:26.57
W4x	Ukraine (UKR); Svitlana Spiriukhova; Nataliia Huba; Olena Olefirenko; Tetiana Kolesnikova	6:42.34	Romania (ROM); Ionelia Neacşu; Enikő Barabás; Camelia Lupașcu; Roxana Cogianu	6:47.50	Germany (GER); Sophie Dunsing; Julia Richter; Judith Aldinger; Lena Moebus	6:47.64
W8+	Romania (ROU); Rodica Şerban-Florea; Viorica Susanu; Simona Muşat-Strimbeschi; Ana Maria Apachiţei; Aurica Bărăscu; Ioana Papuc; Georgeta Damian-Andrunache; Doina Ignat; Elena Georgescu-Nedelc	6:23.24	Germany (GER); Josephine Wartenberg; Marlene Sinnig; Sonja Ziegler; Katrin Reinert; Kerstin Naumann; Nadine Schmutzler; Nina Wengert; Silke Günther; Annina Ruppel	6:27.87	Great Britain (GBR); Jo Cook; Lindsey Maguire; Alice Freeman; Rebecca Rowe; Vicki Etiebet; Lauren Fisher; Anna McNuff; Vicky Myers; Rebecca Dowbiggin	6:32.58

== Medal table ==
Rank	Nation	Gold	Silver	Bronze	Total
1	Czech Republic (CZE)	3	1	1	5
2	Greece (GRE)	2	1	1	4
3	Germany (GER)	1	2	2	5
4	Italy (ITA)	1	1	2	4
5	Romania (ROM)	1	1	1	3
5	Russia (RUS)	1	1	1	3
7	Serbia (SRB)	1	1	0	2
8	Bulgaria (BUL)	1	0	1	2
9	Austria (AUT)	1	0	0	1
9	Hungary (HUN)	1	0	0	1
9	Ukraine (UKR)	1	0	0	1
12	Poland (POL)	0	3	0	3
13	Croatia (CRO)	0	1	0	1
13	Finland (FIN)	0	1	0	1
13	Lithuania (LTU)	0	1	0	1
16	Belarus (BLR)	0	0	3	3
17	Great Britain (GBR)	0	0	1	1
17	Sweden (SWE)	0	0	1	1
Totals (18 entries)		14	14	14	42
