= Aleksandr Savin =

Aleksandr Savin may refer to:

- Aleksandr Savin (volleyball player) (born 1957), Soviet volleyball player
- Alexander Savin (politician) (born 1962), Russian politician
- Aleksandr Savin (footballer) (born 1984), Russian footballer
- Aleksandr Savin (rower) (born 1978), Russian Olympic rower
- Alexander Savin (imposter), who claimed to be Tsarevich Alexei of Russia and was arrested by the OGPU in 1928; see Romanov impostors#Alexei impostors
