= Falcke =

Falcke is a German surname from the German word Falke for falcon. Notable people with the surname include:

- George Falcke (1891–1979), Danish gymnast
- Heino Falcke (born 1966), German astrophysicist
- Martin Müller-Falcke (born 1972), German rower
