= Salvatore Amitrano =

Italian rower (born 1975)

Personal information
- Born: 3 December 1975 (age 50)
Medal record
Representing Italy
Men's rowing
Olympic Games
Bronze medal – third place	2004 Athens	Lwt coxless four
European Championships
Gold medal – first place	2007 Poznań	Lwt coxless four
Gold medal – first place	2008 Marathon	Lwt coxless four
Mediterranean Games
Silver medal – second place	2005 Almería	Lwt coxless pair

Salvatore Amitrano (born 3 December 1975 in Castellammare di Stabia, Province of Naples) is an Italian rower.

Amitrano was a member of the Italian men's lightweight rowing team that won a bronze medal at the 2004 Summer Olympics in Athens.

When not competing, he works for the State Police in Italy.
