= Matthew Smith (rower) =

American rower (born 1977)

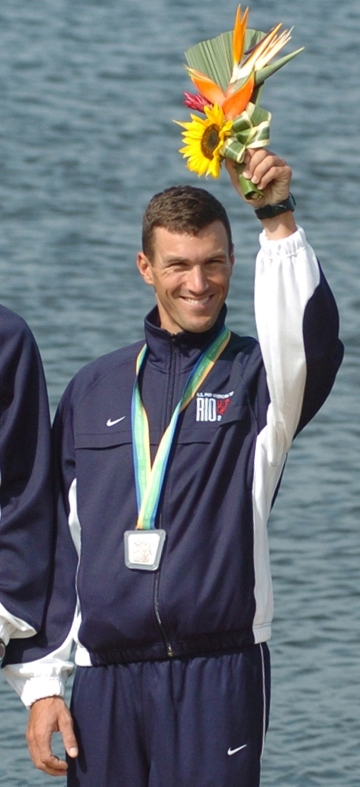
- Smith at the 2007 Pan American Games

Personal information
- Born: December 20, 1977 (age 48) Woodbridge, Virginia, U. S.
- Height: 182 cm (6 ft 0 in)
- Weight: 71 kg (157 lb)

Sport
- Sport: Lightweight rowing
- Club: U.S. Army
Medal record
Representing the United States
Pan American Games
| Silver medal – second place | 2007 Rio de Janeiro | LM4- |
World Rowing Championships
| Bronze medal – third place | 2002 Seville | LM8+ |

Matthew Smith (born December 20, 1977) is a retired American competitor in lightweight rowing. He won a silver medal at the 2007 Pan American Games and placed ninth at the 2004 Olympics in the coxless fours. Previously he won a bronze medal in the eights at the 2002 World Championships.

After graduating from the University of Wisconsin–Madison in 2000 Smith joined the U.S. Army, eventually reaching the rank of Captain and earning the Bronze Star and Meritorious Service Medal. While serving in the army he continued rowing and graduated from the United States Army Airborne School and Ranger School. In 2022 Matt was inducted into the University of Wisconsin-Madison Army ROTC Hall of Fame.

Smith started training rowers back in 2002 when he was still associated with the University of Wisconsin. In 2012–2013 he became assistant coach for the national under-23 team, and in 2014 was promoted to head coach.

Smith is married to Hilary Gehman, who is also a rowing coach; they have two sons, Luke and Carson.
