= Nick English =

British rower

Personal information
- Nationality: British
- Born: 5 November 1978 (age 47) Coventry, England

Sport
- Sport: Rowing

Nick English (born 5 November 1978) is a British rower. He competed in the men's lightweight coxless four event at the 2004 Summer Olympics.
