= Tim Bartels =

German rower

Personal information
- Born: 31 January 1988 (age 38) Schönebeck, Germany
Medal record
Men's rowing
Representing Germany
World Championships
| Bronze medal – third place | 2009 Poznań | Quad scull |
European Championships
| Bronze medal – third place | 2007 Poznań | Double scull |

Tim Bartels (born 31 January 1988 in Schönebeck) is a German rower.
