= Catello Amarante (rower, born 1979) =

Italian rower

Personal information
- Born: 15 August 1979 (age 46) Naples, Italy

Sport
- Club: Fiamme Gialle
Medal record
Men's rowing
Representing Italy
Olympic Games
Bronze medal – third place	2004 Athens	Lwt coxless four
World Championships
Silver medal – second place	2011 Bled	Lwt eight
European Championships
Gold medal – first place	2007 Poznań	Lwt coxless four
Mediterranean Games
Silver medal – second place	2005 Almería	Lwt coxless pair

Catello Amarante (born 15 August 1979 in Naples) is an Italian rower, who won the bronze medal at the 2004 Summer Olympics in the men's lightweight coxless four.
