= Tim Male =

Tim Male (born 7 September 1979) is an Olympic rower who represented Great Britain in the lightweight four at the Olympic Games in 2004 and current Head Coach of King's College London Boat Club

Born in Yeovil, Somerset, Male started to row at The Oratory School after deciding that he was a less–than–exceptional cox. After school he moved on to the University of Southampton to study music and continued with his rowing, winning his first GB vest in the World Under 23 Championships in 1996 and finishing 8th in the singles.

Tim joined Tideway Scullers School after university and graduated to the senior team in 1998. From then until 2002 he raced in the lightweight double and then moved to the lightweight four in the 2002/3 and 2003/4 seasons, qualifying for the Olympic Games at the 2003 World Rowing Championships in Milan and finishing 13th in Athens.

He was selected for the Sydney Olympics in 2000 to compete in the lightweight double scull but broke his wrist in a freak training accident days before the Games were due to start.

Until 2002 he was a sculler and he returned to sculling for the 2005 season, winning a bronze medal in the lightweight men's single scull at the Eton World Cup before finishing fourth at the Lucerne World Cup in July.

He finished second in the lightweight men's single at the 2006 Great Britain Senior Selection Trials in Belgium.

Male is an accomplished violinist. In 2005 he became the father of a daughter. He was a rowing coach at St George's College, Weybridge in Surrey.

== Competitive records ==
Olympic Games

- 2004 13th lightweight four

World Championships

- 2006 4th lightweight quad scull
- 2003 11th lightweight four
- 2002 11th lightweight double scull
- 2001 11th lightweight double scull
- 1999 9th lightweight double scull
- 1998 13th lightweight double scull
- 1996 reserve lightweight sculling squad

World U23 Championships

- 1997 7th lightweight single scull
- 1996 8th lightweight single scull
