= Eugene Coakley =

Irish rower

Medal record

Men's rowing

Representing Ireland

World Rowing Championships
| Silver medal – second place | 2005 Gifu | LM4- |
| Bronze medal – third place | 2006 Eton | LM4- |

Eugene Coakley (born 7 March 1979) is an Irish rower. He finished 6th in the men's lightweight coxless four at the 2004 Summer Olympics.
