= Kerstin Naumann =

German rower

Medal record

Women's rowing

Representing Germany

World Rowing Championships
Silver medal – second place	2005 Gifu	Coxless four
Silver medal – second place	2007 Munich	Coxless four

European Championships
Silver medal – second place	2007 Poznań	Eight

Kerstin Naumann (born 17 September 1981 in Dresden) is a German rower.
