= Axel Schuster =

German rower

Personal information
- Nationality: German
- Born: 11 February 1976 (age 49); East Berlin, East Germany

Sport
- Sport: Rowing

Axel Schuster (born 11 February 1976) is a German rower. He competed in the men's lightweight coxless four event at the 2004 Summer Olympics.
