= Jonathan Mandick =

Canadian rower

Jonathan Mandick (born January 11, 1981) is a Canadian rower who has competed in the world championships and Olympic Games.

Born in Edmonton, Alberta, Mandick was a student at the University of Victoria. He won a bronze medal at the 2002 world championships in Seville, Spain in the men's lightweight fours event. In 2004 he competed at the Athens Olympics where he finished 5th in the lightweight coxless four discipline.
