= Juliusz Madecki =

Austrian rower

Personal information
- Nationality: Austrian
- Born: 17 June 1979 (age 45); Wrocław, Poland

Sport
- Sport: Rowing

Juliusz Madecki (born 17 June 1979) is an Austrian rower. He competed in the men's lightweight coxless four event at the 2004 Summer Olympics.
