= Sport Northern Ireland =

Sports council for Northern Ireland

- Sport Northern Ireland logo
- Abbreviation: Sport NI
- Formation: 31 December 1973; 52 years ago
- Type: NGO
- Purpose: Development of sport in Northern Ireland
- Headquarters: House of Sport
- Location: 2a Upper Malone Road, Belfast, County Antrim, BT9 5LA
- Coordinates: 54.5578°N 5.9567°W
- Region served: Northern Ireland
- Key people: Antoinette McKeown (CEO); Richard Archibald (interim CEO)
- Parent organization: Department for Communities
- Affiliations: UK Sport, UK Anti-Doping, The National Lottery
- Staff: 80 (permanent employees) (2023)
- Website: www.sportni.net
- Formerly called: Sports Council of Northern Ireland

Sport Northern Ireland, officially the Sports Council for Northern Ireland, is the regional government sports council (funding body) for Northern Ireland. Its head office is based, near Barnett Demesne, at the "House of Sport" on Upper Malone Road in Belfast. It receives some funding from the taxpayer (receiving £11m from the Exchequer in 2022/2023), with funding also coming from the National Lottery (£8m in 2016/2017).

== History ==
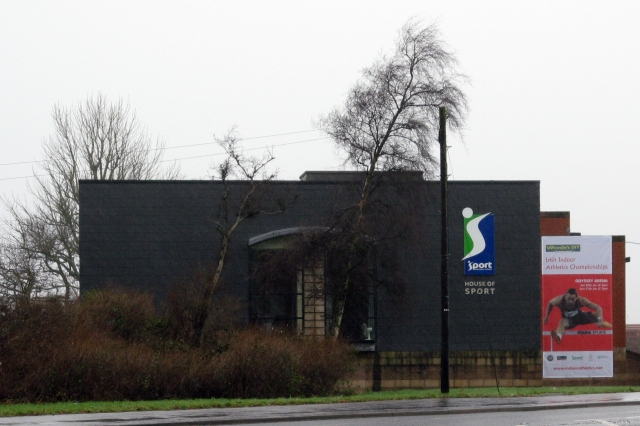
Sport NI HQ

The organisation was established under the Recreation and Youth Service (Northern Ireland) Order 1973, with its purpose defined by Article 3 of the Recreation and Youth Service (Northern Ireland) Order 1986. Another organisation, the Youth and Sports Council for Northern Ireland, had been established by the Youth Welfare, Physical Training and Recreation Act of 1962.

The organisation, which is also known as Sport NI, was responsible Northern Ireland's involvement in the UK School Games from 2006 onwards. Sport NI was involved in the building of Northern Ireland's first Olympic-size (50m) swimming pool. The Bangor Aurora Aquatic and Leisure Complex opened in 2013.

In 2015, a number of members of the organisation's board resigned, following the publication of a report into issues with the "leadership, management and the overall culture" of Sport NI. The organisation's chairperson and vice-chair also stepped down.

In early 2021, Sport NI oversaw the disbursement of over £22m in funding to sports bodies in the region, including the GAA Ulster Council, Irish Football Association, Golf Ireland and IRFU Ulster Branch, to "support sporting bodies through the [COVID19] pandemic". This program was later described as "flawed" with the Northern Ireland Audit Office questioning why over £1.5m (nearly 7% of the total fund) was given to the Royal County Down Golf Club - when the club already had a "very significant bank balance and a high level of reserves".

A BBC news article, dated January 2024, noted that the organisation's CEO was absent from the post, with the former Olympic rower Richard Archibald then acting as "interim CEO".

== Facilities ==
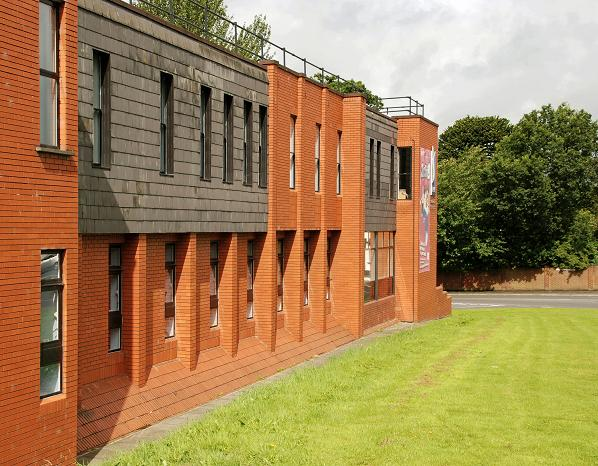
Sport NI's headquarters - known as the House of Sport

The Sports Institute for Northern Ireland (SINI), with facilities at Ulster University's Jordanstown campus (UUJ), was established as a partnership between Sport NI and Ulster University. It was formed in 2002 to create a "high performance sporting system" in Northern Ireland. Primarily based at UUJ, the institute has also operated separate 'Performance Development Centres' (PDCs) in Bangor, Belfast, Cookstown and Lisburn. SINI's services include performance planning, sport medicine, physiotherapy, performance analysis and advice.

Sport NI also operates a national outdoor training centre, the Tollymore National Outdoor Centre, near Tollymore Forest Park at the base of the Mourne Mountains. This facility, used as a training base for mountaineering and canoeing, was built in 1970.

== See also ==
- Sport Ireland, similar organisation for the Republic of Ireland
- Northern Ireland at the Commonwealth Games
- Northern Ireland Federation of Sub-Aqua Clubs
