= Richard Archibald =

Irish rower

Medal record

Men's rowing

Representing Ireland

World Championships
Silver medal – second place	2005 Gifu	LM4-
Bronze medal – third place	2006 Eton	LM4-

Richard Archibald (born 18 January 1978 in Coleraine, United Kingdom) is a Northern Irish rower. He finished 6th in the men's lightweight coxless four at the 2004 Summer Olympics. He rowed for Coleraine Academical Institution Boat Club and Queen's University Belfast Boat Club.

As of 2024, Archibald was acting as "interim CEO" of Sport Northern Ireland.
