= Joeri de Groot =

Dutch rower

Medal record

Men's rowing

Representing the Netherlands

World Rowing Championships
Silver medal – second place	2003 Milan	LM4-

Joeri de Groot (born 29 July 1977 in Spijkenisse) is a Dutch rower. He finished 4th in the men's lightweight coxless four at the 2004 Summer Olympics.
