= Valery Sarychev =

Russian rower

Personal information
- Nationality: Russian
- Born: 23 November 1984 (age 40); Voronezh, Russia

Sport
- Sport: Rowing

Valery Sarychev (born 23 November 1984) is a Russian rower. He competed in the men's lightweight coxless four event at the 2004 Summer Olympics.
