= Jesús González (rower, born 1974) =

Spanish rower

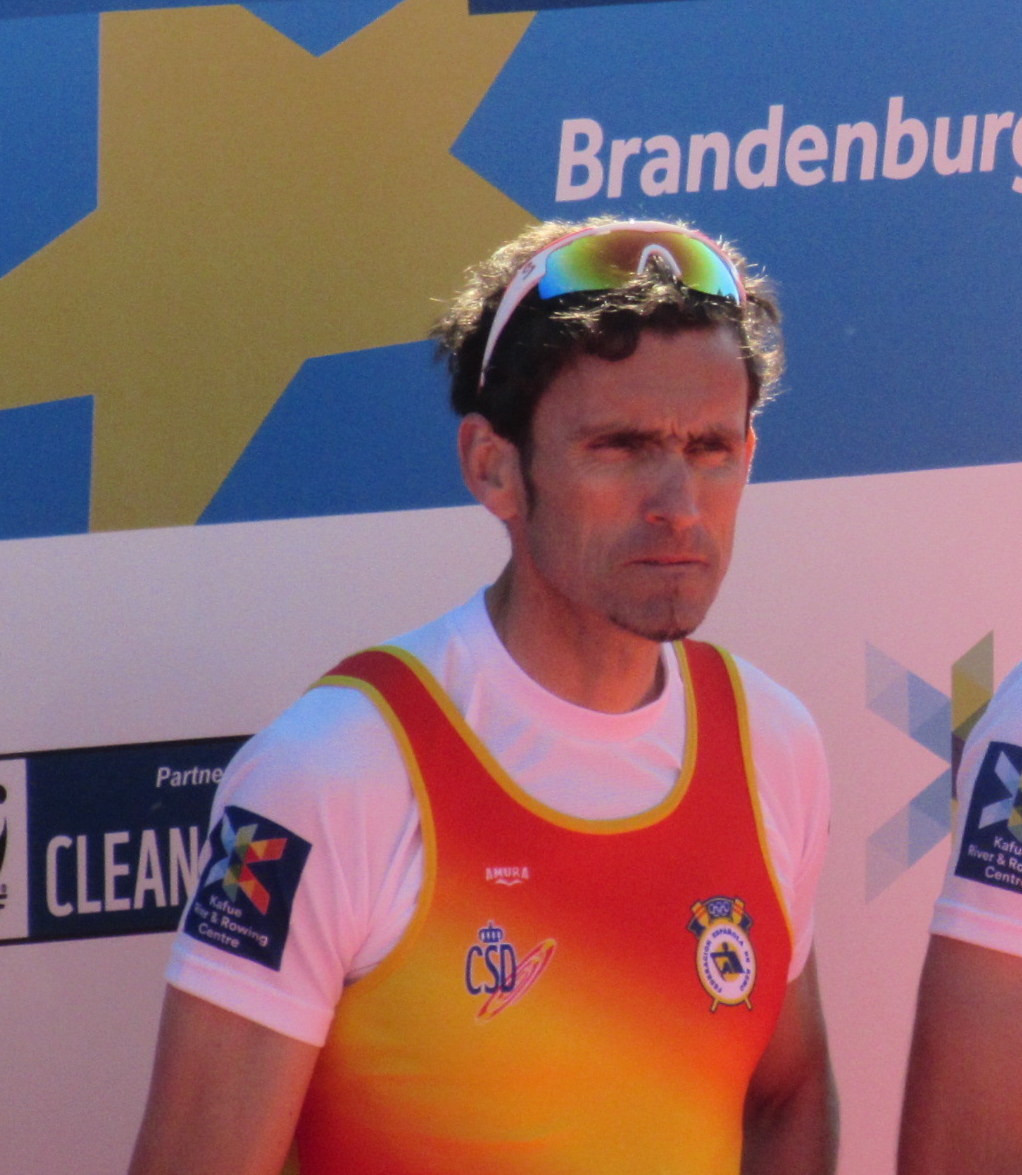
- Gonzalez in 2016

Personal information
- Full name: Jesús González Álvarez
- Born: 9 September 1974 (age 51) Pontevedra, Spain

Sport
- Country: Spain
- Sport: Rowing
Medal record
World Championships
Silver medal – second place	2006 Eton	LM2-

Jesús González Álvarez (Note: In this Spanish name, the first or paternal surname is González and the second or maternal family name is Álvarez.) (born 9 September 1974) is a Spanish rower. He competed in the men's lightweight coxless four event at the 2004 Summer Olympics.
