= Sebastian Sageder =

Austrian rower

Personal information
- Born: 25 January 1980 (age 46)

Sport
- Sport: Rowing
Medal record
Men's rowing
Representing Austria
World Rowing Championships
Gold medal – first place	2001 Lucerne	Lwt men's four

Sebastian Sageder (born 25 January 1980) is an Austrian lightweight rower. He won a gold medal at the 2001 World Rowing Championships in Lucerne with the lightweight men's four.
