= Andreas Bech =

German rower

Personal information
- Born: 26 January 1969 (age 57)

Sport
- Sport: Rowing
Medal record
Men's rowing
Representing Germany
World Rowing Championships
Gold medal – first place	1996 Motherwell	Lwt eight

Andreas Bech (born 26 January 1969) is a German lightweight rower. He won a gold medal at the 1996 World Rowing Championships in Motherwell with the lightweight men's eight.
