= Andrea Palmisano =

Italian rower

Personal information
- National team: Italy
- Born: 1 February 1988 (age 38) Rome, Italy
- Height: 1.82 m (6 ft 0 in)
- Weight: 78 kg (172 lb)

Sport
- Sport: Rowing
- Club: Canottieri Aniene
- Start activity: 2002
Medal record
| Event | 1st | 2nd | 3rd |
|---|---|---|---|
| European Championships | 0 | 0 | 2 |

Andrea Palmisano (born 1 February 1988) is an Italian male rower, medal winner at senior level at the European Rowing Championships.
