= Miloš Tomić =

Serbian rower (born 1980)

Personal information
- Born: 2 April 1980 (age 46) Belgrade, Yugoslavia
- Height: 191 cm (6 ft 3 in)
- Weight: 70 kg (154 lb)

Sport
- Sport: Rowing
- Club: Crvena zvezda, Beograd
Medal record
Men's rowing
Representing Serbia
World Championships
Bronze medal – third place	2008 Ottensheim	LM2-
Bronze medal – third place	2009 Poznań	LM2-
European Championships
Silver medal – second place	2007 Poznań	LM4-
Silver medal – second place	2008 Marathon	LM4-
Bronze medal – third place	2009 Brest	LM4-
Bronze medal – third place	2011 Plovdiv	LM4-
Bronze medal – third place	2012 Varese	LM4-

Miloš Tomić (Serbian Cyrillic: Милош Томић; born 2 April 1980 in Belgrade, Yugoslavia) is a Serbian rower.

He participated at the 2004 Summer Olympics and finished first in the B final of the men's lightweight four. He is a 2006 graduate of the Columbia University School of Engineering.
