= Bruno Mascarenhas =

Italian rower (born 1981)

Medal record

Men's rowing

Representing Italy

Olympic Games
Bronze medal – third place	2004 Athens	Lwt coxless four

World Rowing Championships
Gold medal – first place	2009 Poznań	Lwt eight
Silver medal – second place	2002 Seville	Lwt coxless four
Bronze medal – third place	2003 Milan	Lwt coxless four
Bronze medal – third place	2005 Gifu	Lwt coxless four
Bronze medal – third place	2007 Munich	Lwt coxless four
Bronze medal – third place	2010 Karapiro	Lwt eight

European Championships
Gold medal – first place	2007 Poznań	Lwt coxless four

Bruno Mascarenhas (born 16 July 1981 in Lisbon) is an Italian rower.
