= Veljko Urošević =

Serbian rower (born 1978)

Medal record

Men's rowing

Representing Serbia

European Championships
| Silver medal – second place | 2007 Poznań | LM4- |
| Silver medal – second place | 2008 Marathon | LM4- |

Veljko Urošević (Serbian: Вељко Урошевић, born 27 February 1978 in Belgrade, SR Serbia, Yugoslavia) is a Serbian rower.

He participated at the 2004 Summer Olympics and finished first in the B final of the men's lightweight four.

Urošević graduated from Columbia University in 2003.
