= Martin Müller-Falcke =

German rower

Personal information
- Nationality: German
- Born: 26 April 1972 (age 52); Rinteln, Germany

Sport
- Sport: Rowing

Martin Müller-Falcke (born 26 April 1972) is a German former rower. He competed in the men's lightweight coxless four event at the 2004 Summer Olympics.
