= Mario Arranz =

Spanish rower

Personal information
- Nationality: Spanish
- Born: 10 March 1978 (age 47); Barakaldo, Spain

Sport
- Sport: Rowing

Mario Arranz (born 10 March 1978) is a Spanish rower. He competed in the men's lightweight coxless four event at the 2004 Summer Olympics.
