= Carlos Loriente =

Spanish rower

Personal information
- Nationality: Spanish
- Born: 27 July 1978 (age 46); Lugo, Spain

Sport
- Sport: Rowing

Carlos Loriente (born 27 July 1978) is a Spanish rower. He competed in the men's lightweight coxless four event at the 2004 Summer Olympics.
