= Alberto Domínguez (rower) =

Spanish rower

Personal information
- Full name: Alberto Domínguez Lorenzo
- Nationality: Spanish
- Born: 2 April 1978 (age 46); Avilés, Spain

Sport
- Sport: Rowing

Alberto Domínguez Lorenzo (Note: In this Spanish name, the first or paternal surname is Domínguez and the second or maternal family name is Lorenzo.) (born 2 April 1978) is a Spanish rower. He competed in the men's lightweight coxless four event at the 2004 Summer Olympics.
