= Soraya García =

Spanish handball player (born 1978)

Personal information
- Nationality: Spanish
- Born: 21 March 1978 (age 48) León, Spain

Sport
- Sport: Handball
National team
- Years: Team
- –: Spain

Soraya García (born 21 March 1978) is a Spanish handball player.

She was born in León, Spain. She competed at the 2004 Summer Olympics, where Spain finished 6th.
