= Nenad Babović =

Serbian rower (born 1976)

Medal record

Men's rowing

Representing Serbia

World Championships
Bronze medal – third place	2009 Poznań	LM2-

European Championships
Silver medal – second place	2007 Poznań	LM4-
Silver medal – second place	2008 Marathon	LM4-
Bronze medal – third place	2009 Brest	LM4-
Bronze medal – third place	2011 Plovdiv	LM4-
Bronze medal – third place	2012 Varese	LM4-

Nenad Babović (Serbian Cyrillic: Ненад Бабовић, born 2 January 1976 in Belgrade, SR Serbia, Yugoslavia) is a Serbian rower.

He participated at the 2004 Summer Olympics and finished first in the B final of the Men's Lightweight Fours.
