= Goran Nedeljković =

Serbian rower (born 1982)

Medal record

Men's rowing

Representing Serbia

World Championships
Bronze medal – third place	2008 Ottensheim	LM2-

European Championships
Silver medal – second place	2007 Poznan	LM4-
Silver medal – second place	2008 Marathon	LM4-

World Rowing Junior Championships
Silver medal – second place	1999 Plovdiv	2x

Goran Nedeljković (Serbian Cyrillic: Горан Недељковић, born 20 August 1982 in Smederevo, SR Serbia, Yugoslavia) is a Serbian rower.

He participated at the 2004 Summer Olympics and finished first in the B final of the men's lightweight four.
