= Aleksandr Savin (rower) =

Russian rower

Personal information
- Nationality: Russian
- Born: 13 December 1978 (age 46); Lipetsk, Russia

Sport
- Sport: Rowing

Aleksandr Savin (born 13 December 1978) is a Russian rower. He competed in the men's lightweight coxless four event at the 2004 Summer Olympics.
