= Sergey Bukreyev =

Russian rower

Personal information
- Nationality: Russian
- Born: 20 June 1976 (age 48); Moscow, Russia

Sport
- Sport: Rowing

Sergey Bukreyev (born 20 June 1976) is a Russian rower. He competed at the 2000 Summer Olympics and the 2004 Summer Olympics.
