= Rowing at the Asian Games =

- Governing bodies: WR (World) / ARF (Asia)
- Events: 14 (men: 7; women: 7)

Games
- 1951; 1954; 1958; 1962; 1966; 1970; 1974; 1978; 1982; 1986; 1990; 1994; 1998; 2002; 2006; 2010; 2014; 2018; 2022; 2026
- Medalists

Rowing has been contested at every Asian Games since its introduction to the program at the 1982 Asian Games.

== Editions ==
Games	Year	Host city	Best nation
IX	1982	New Delhi, India	China
X	1986	Seoul, South Korea	China
XI	1990	Beijing, China	China
XII	1994	Hiroshima, Japan	China
XIII	1998	Bangkok, Thailand	China
XIV	2002	Busan, South Korea	China
XV	2006	Doha, Qatar	China
XVI	2010	Guangzhou, China	China
XVII	2014	Incheon, South Korea	China
XVIII	2018	Jakarta–Palembang, Indonesia	China
XIX	2022	Hangzhou, China	China
XX	2026	Aichi–Nagoya, Japan	China

== Events ==
Event	82	86	90	94	98	02	06	10	14	18	22	26	Years
Men
Single sculls	X	X	X	X	X	X	X	X	X	X	X	X	12
Double sculls			X	X	X	X	X	X	X	X	X	X	10
Quadruple sculls									X	X	X	X	4
Coxless pair	X	X	X	X						X	X	X	7
Coxed pair	X	X											2
Coxless four			X	X	X	X	X	X			X	X	8
Coxed four	X	X											2
Eight		X	X	X		X		X	X		X		7
Lightweight single sculls			X		X	X	X	X	X	X		X	8
Lightweight double sculls			X	X	X	X	X	X	X	X	X	X	10
Lightweight quadruple sculls									X				1
Lightweight coxless four			X	X	X	X		X		X			6
Lightweight eight										X			1
Women
Single sculls		X	X	X	X	X	X	X	X	X	X	X	11
Double sculls						X	X	X	X	X	X	X	7
Quadruple sculls									X		X	X	3
Coxless pair		X	X	X		X		X	X	X	X	X	9
Coxless four			X	X	X	X	X	X		X	X	X	9
Coxed four		X											1
Eight											X		1
Lightweight single sculls			X		X	X	X	X	X	X		X	8
Lightweight double sculls			X	X	X	X	X	X	X	X	X	X	10
Lightweight quadruple sculls					X			X	X	X			4
Lightweight coxless four			X	X									2
Total	4	8	14	12	11	13	10	14	14	15	14	14	

== Medal table ==
Rank	Nation	Gold	Silver	Bronze	Total
1	China (CHN)	112	7	2	121
2	Japan (JPN)	9	38	16	63
3	Uzbekistan (UZB)	6	15	10	31
4	South Korea (KOR)	4	23	24	51
5	Iran (IRI)	4	8	6	18
6	Hong Kong (HKG)	3	14	9	26
7	India (IND)	2	7	20	29
8	Indonesia (INA)	1	5	10	16
9	Vietnam (VIE)	1	4	9	14
10	Kazakhstan (KAZ)	1	4	7	12
11	North Korea (PRK)	0	8	9	17
12	Chinese Taipei (TPE)	0	4	2	6
13	Thailand (THA)	0	3	12	15
14	Turkmenistan (TKM)	0	3	1	4
15	Pakistan (PAK)	0	0	3	3
16	Iraq (IRQ)	0	0	1	1
16	Philippines (PHI)	0	0	1	1
Totals (17 entries)		143	143	142	428
