= Rowing at the 1998 Asian Games =

- Venue: Map Prachan Reservoir
- Dates: 16–19 December 1998
- Competitors: 156 from 15 nations

Rowing at the 1998 Asian Games was held in Map Prachan Reservoir, Chonburi Province, Thailand from December 16 to 19, 1998.

== Schedule ==
H	Heats	R	Repechages	F	Finals

Event↓/Date →	16th Wed	17th Thu	18th Fri	19th Sat
Men's single sculls			F	
Men's double sculls	H	R		F
Men's coxless four	H	R		F
Men's lightweight single sculls	H	R		F
Men's lightweight double sculls	H	R	F	
Men's lightweight coxless four			F	
Women's single sculls	H	R		F
Women's coxless four				F
Women's lightweight single sculls			F	
Women's lightweight double sculls	H	R		F
Women's lightweight quadruple sculls			F	

== Medalists ==
=== Men ===
Event	Gold	Silver	Bronze
Single sculls	Cai Yukun; China	Lasmin; Indonesia	Muhammad Akram; Pakistan
Double sculls	China; Cui Yonghui; Li Yang	Japan; Kazuaki Mimoto; Daisaku Takeda	North Korea; Kim Sun-yong; Ri Kye-jun
Coxless four	China; Zhang Binggui; Nie Junliang; Sun Jun; Dai Haizhen	Japan; Shinpei Murai; Yukuo Okamoto; Tatsuya Mizutani; Tatsunori Nishioka	India; Birbal Singh; Tarlochan Singh; Johnson Xavier; Jagjit Singh
Lightweight single sculls	Hua Lingjun; China	Kim Il-yong; North Korea	Muhammad Akram; Pakistan
Lightweight double sculls	China; Gao Bingrong; Liu Jian	Japan; Kazuaki Mimoto; Daisaku Takeda	North Korea; Ri Chol-jin; Kim Song-chol
Lightweight coxless four	China; Liu Zewu; Zhou Guoyang; Wang Xutao; Mao Zhixing	Japan; Yoshitomo Kitanoue; Atsushi Obata; Hiroya Sato; Kazushige Ura	India; B. K. K. Thankachan; Rampal Singh; Pappi Singh; Kasam Khan

=== Women ===
Event	Gold	Silver	Bronze
Single sculls	Zhang Xiuyun; China	Fenella Ng; Hong Kong	Junko Kano; Japan
Coxless four	China; Liu Lijuan; Yang Limei; Sun Guangxia; Liu Xiaochun	Kazakhstan; Irina Dmitriyeva; Natalya Orlova; Vera Nabiyeva; Vera Filimonova	Chinese Taipei; Chen Li-chao; Yu Chen-chun; Feng Mei-hua; Chiu Hui-chen
Lightweight single sculls	Ou Shaoyan; China	Fenella Ng; Hong Kong	Phuttharaksa Neegree; Thailand
Lightweight double sculls	China; Fan Ruihua; Ou Shaoyan	Japan; Akiko Iwamoto; Yoshie Sugiyama	North Korea; Ri Son-yong; Mun Won-ok
Lightweight quadruple sculls	China; Fan Ruihua; Shen Senping; Peng Ying; Liu Bili	Japan; Aiko Asano; Yoshie Sugiyama; Junko Kano; Akiko Iwamoto	North Korea; Kim Mi-sun; Rim Kum-suk; Mun Won-ok; Ri Son-yong

== Medal table ==
Rank	Nation	Gold	Silver	Bronze	Total
1	China (CHN)	11	0	0	11
2	Japan (JPN)	0	6	1	7
3	Hong Kong (HKG)	0	2	0	2
4	North Korea (PRK)	0	1	4	5
5	Indonesia (INA)	0	1	0	1
5	Kazakhstan (KAZ)	0	1	0	1
7	India (IND)	0	0	2	2
7	Pakistan (PAK)	0	0	2	2
9	Chinese Taipei (TPE)	0	0	1	1
9	Thailand (THA)	0	0	1	1
Totals (10 entries)		11	11	11	33

== Participating nations ==
A total of 156 athletes from 15 nations competed in rowing at the 1998 Asian Games:

- China (24)
- Chinese Taipei (8)
- Hong Kong (7)
- India (8)
- Indonesia (4)
- Japan (14)
- Kazakhstan (9)
- North Korea (13)
- Pakistan (5)
- Philippines (13)
- Singapore (3)
- South Korea (14)
- Thailand (23)
- Turkmenistan (2)
- Uzbekistan (9)
