= Rowing at the 2002 Asian Games =

- Venue: Nakdong River
- Dates: 30 September – 3 October 2002
- Competitors: 196 from 17 nations

For the Rowing competition at the 2002 Asian Games in Busan, South Korea, men's and women's singles, doubles, and fours competed at the Nakdong River Rowing and Canoeing Courses from September 30 to October 3.

== Schedule ==
H	Heats	R	Repechages	F	Finals

Event↓/Date →	30th Mon	1st Tue	2nd Wed	3rd Thu
Men's single sculls	H	R	F	
Men's double sculls	H	R		F
Men's coxless four			F	
Men's eight	H	R		F
Men's lightweight single sculls	H	R	F	
Men's lightweight double sculls	H	R		F
Men's lightweight coxless four	H	R		F
Women's single sculls	H	R	F	
Women's double sculls	H	R		F
Women's coxless pair				F
Women's coxless four			F	
Women's lightweight single sculls	H	R	F	
Women's lightweight double sculls	H	R		F

== Medalists ==
=== Men ===
Event	Gold	Silver	Bronze
Single sculls	Cui Yonghui; China	Law Hiu Fung; Hong Kong	Muhammad Akram; Pakistan
Double sculls	China; Wang Jingfeng; Su Hui	Kazakhstan; Yevgeniy Latypov; Mikhail Garnik	South Korea; Kim Jung-kwan; Kim Dal-ho
Coxless four	China; Sun Jian; Chen Zheng; Wang Bo; Chi Huanqi	Uzbekistan; Nasrullo Nazarov; Bahadir Davletyarov; Vladimir Tremasov; Ruslan Bichurin	India; Jenil Krishnan; Inderpal Singh; Roshan Lal; Paulose Pandari Kunnel
Eight	China; Chen Lingbu; Zhang Ningtao; Dong Wenfeng; Ma Weiguo; Tian Qiqiang; Chi Huanqi; Zhou Qiang; Li Xinghai; Zhang Dechang	Japan; Daisaku Takeda; Hitoshi Hase; Akio Yano; Yasunori Tanabe; Kazushige Ura; Kazuaki Mimoto; Atsushi Obata; Kenji Miura; Takehiro Kubo	Uzbekistan; Vitaliy Silayev; Dmitriy Tikhonov; Nasrullo Nazarov; Bahadir Davletyarov; Ruslan Bichurin; Sergey Makshov; Vladimir Tremasov; Dmitriy Krivo; Sergey Yoqubov
Lightweight single sculls	Zhu Zhifu; China	Hitoshi Hase; Japan	Law Hiu Fung; Hong Kong
Lightweight double sculls	Japan; Daisaku Takeda; Kazushige Ura	China; Yang Maozong; Chen Hong	Philippines; Alvin Amposta; Nestor Cordova
Lightweight coxless four	China; Wang Linfei; Li Haitao; Huang Zhigang; Zhang Guoyang	Japan; Akio Yano; Kazuaki Mimoto; Takehiro Kubo; Atsushi Obata	Indonesia; Rodiaman; Rahmat; Agus Budi Aji; Aldino Maryandi

=== Women ===
Event	Gold	Silver	Bronze
Single sculls	Zhang Xiuyun; China	Naoe Harada; Japan	Lee Eun-hwa; South Korea
Double sculls	China; Dang Junling; Li Qin	Japan; Akiko Iwamoto; Atsuko Yamauchi	North Korea; Ri Ryon-hwa; Kim Mi-sun
Coxless pair	China; Zhang Xiuyun; Yang Cuiping	Uzbekistan; Sevara Ganieva; Anna Kuznetsova	South Korea; Beak Sun-mi; Kim Kyoung-mi
Coxless four	China; Cong Huanling; Yu Jing; Han Jing; Yan Na	Chinese Taipei; Chiang Chien-ju; Chi Yao-hsuan; Yu Chen-chun; Su Hui-ching	Uzbekistan; Sevara Ganieva; Albina Ahmerova; Zarrina Ganieva; Anna Kuznetsova
Lightweight single sculls	Fu Fengjun; China	Phuttharaksa Neegree; Thailand	Yung Ka Yan; Hong Kong
Lightweight double sculls	China; Xu Dongxiang; Wang Yanni	Thailand; Phuttharaksa Neegree; Bussayamas Phaengkathok	Japan; Kahori Uchiyama; Yumi Uoshita

== Medal table ==
Rank	Nation	Gold	Silver	Bronze	Total
1	China (CHN)	12	1	0	13
2	Japan (JPN)	1	5	1	7
3	Uzbekistan (UZB)	0	2	2	4
4	Thailand (THA)	0	2	0	2
5	Hong Kong (HKG)	0	1	2	3
6	Chinese Taipei (TPE)	0	1	0	1
6	Kazakhstan (KAZ)	0	1	0	1
8	South Korea (KOR)	0	0	3	3
9	India (IND)	0	0	1	1
9	Indonesia (INA)	0	0	1	1
9	North Korea (PRK)	0	0	1	1
9	Pakistan (PAK)	0	0	1	1
9	Philippines (PHI)	0	0	1	1
Totals (13 entries)		13	13	13	39

== Participating nations ==
A total of 196 athletes from 17 nations competed in rowing at the 2002 Asian Games:

- China (33)
- Chinese Taipei (15)
- Hong Kong (6)
- India (19)
- Indonesia (9)
- Japan (17)
- Kazakhstan (6)
- Kuwait (4)
- Myanmar (4)
- North Korea (9)
- Pakistan (10)
- Philippines (4)
- Singapore (2)
- South Korea (35)
- Sri Lanka (8)
- Thailand (2)
- Uzbekistan (13)
