= Rowing at the 2000 Summer Olympics – Men's lightweight double sculls =

Men's lightweight double sculls at the Games of the XXVII Olympiad
- Venue: Sydney International Regatta Centre
- Date: 18–24 September 2000
- Competitors: 38 from 19 nations
- Winning time: 6:21.75

Medalists
1st place, gold medalist(s)		Tomasz Kucharski; Robert Sycz	Poland
2nd place, silver medalist(s)		Elia Luini; Leonardo Pettinari	Italy
3rd place, bronze medalist(s)		Pascal Touron; Thibaud Chapelle	France

The men's lightweight double sculls competition at the 2000 Summer Olympics in Sydney, Australia took place at the Sydney International Regatta Centre.

== Competition format ==
This rowing event is a double scull event, meaning that each boat is propelled by a pair of rowers. The "scull" portion means that the rower uses two oars, one on each side of the boat; this contrasts with sweep rowing in which each rower has one oar and rows on only one side. As a lightweight rowing competition, the body mass of the rowers was limited to a maximum of 72.5 kilograms each and 70 kilograms on average.

The competition consisted of multiple rounds. Finals were held to determine the placing of each boat; these finals were given letters with those nearer to the beginning of the alphabet meaning a better ranking. Semifinals were named based on which finals they fed, with each semifinal having two possible finals.

With 19 boats in heats, the best boats qualify directly for the semi-finals. All other boats progress to the repechage round, which offers a second chance to qualify for the semi-finals. Unsuccessful boats from the repechage must proceed to final C, which determines places 13–18. The best three boats in each of the two semi-finals qualify for final A, which determines places 1–6 (including the medals). Unsuccessful boats from semi-finals A/B go forward to final B, which determines places 7–12.

== Schedule ==
All times are Australian Time (UTC+10)

Date	Time	Round
Monday, 18 September 2000	09:00	Heats
Wednesday, 20 September 2000	09:00	Repechages
Friday, 22 September 2000	08:50	Semifinals
Saturday, 23 September 2000	11:20	Final B
Saturday, 23 September 2000	12:20	Final C
Sunday, 24 September 2000	08:50	Final

== Results ==
=== Heats ===
The winner of each heat advanced to the semifinals, remainder goes to the repechage.

==== Heat 1 ====
Rank	Rower	Country	Time	Notes
1	Tomasz Kucharski; Robert Sycz	Poland	6:34.28	Q
2	Markus Gier; Michael Gier	Switzerland	6:37.88	R
3	Ulf Lienhard; Sebastián Massa	Argentina	6:40.16	R
4	Steve Tucker; Conal Groom	United States	6:42.08	R
5	Josef Källström; Anders Båtemyr	Sweden	6:42.67	R

==== Heat 2 ====
Rank	Rower	Country	Time	Notes
1	Haimish Karrasch; Bruce Hick	Australia	6:33.48	Q
2	Ingo Euler; Bernhard Rühling	Germany	6:40.53	R
3	Raúl León; Osmani Martín	Cuba	6:42.24	R
4	Sergey Dmitryaychev; Dmitry Ovechko	Russia	6:46.34	R
5	Zahid Ali Pirzada; Hazrat Islam	Pakistan	7:13.62	R

==== Heat 3 ====
Rank	Rower	Country	Time	Notes
1	Pascal Touron, Thibaud Chapelle	France	6:32.73	Q
2	Juan Zunzunegui; Rubén Álvarez	Spain	6:34.89	R
3	Maarten van der Linden; Pepijn Aardewijn	Netherlands	6:38.62	R
4	Tom Kay; Tom Middleton	Great Britain	6:41.74	R
5	Lo Sing Yan; Lui Kam Chi	Hong Kong	7:09.75	R

==== Heat 4 ====
Rank	Rower	Country	Time	Notes
1	Elia Luini, Leonardo Pettinari	Italy	6:24.73	Q
2	Hitoshi Hase; Daisaku Takeda	Japan	6:27.00	R
3	Vasileios Polymeros; Panagiotis Miliotis	Greece	6:29.68	R
4	Rómulo Bouzas; Gerardo Gómez	Mexico	6:31.24	R

=== Repechage ===
First two qualify to semifinals A/B, the remainder to final C.

==== Repechage 1 ====
Rank	Rower	Country	Time	Notes
1	Hitoshi Hase; Daisaku Takeda	Japan	6:33.81	A/B
2	Maarten van der Linden; Pepijn Aardewijn	Netherlands	6:36.99	A/B
3	Josef Källström; Anders Båtemyr	Sweden	6:38.77	C
4	Sergey Dmitryaychev; Dmitri Ovetchko	Russia	6:44.53	WD

==== Repechage 2 ====
Rank	Rower	Country	Time	Notes
1	Juan Zunzunegui; Rubén Álvarez	Spain	6:39.20	A/B
2	Steve Tucker; Conal Groom	United States	6:39.72	A/B
3	Raúl León; Osmani Martin	Cuba	6:44.08	WD

==== Repechage 3 ====
Rank	Rower	Country	Time	Notes
1	Ingo Euler; Bernhard Rühling	Germany	6:36.26	A/B
2	Romu Bouzas Rodriguez; Gerard Gomez Counahan	Mexico	6:38.07	A/B
3	Ulf Lienhard; Sebastian Rodrigo Massa	Argentina	6:41.10	C
4	Sing Yan Lo; Kam Chi Lui	Hong Kong	7:05.05	C

==== Repechage 4 ====
Rank	Rower	Country	Time	Notes
1	Markus Gier; Michael Gier	Switzerland	6:35.39	A/B
2	Vasileios Polymeros; Panagiotis Miliotis	Greece	6:38.78	A/B
3	Tom Kay; Tom Middleton	Great Britain	6:43.25	C
4	Zahid Ali Pirzada; Hazrat Islam	Pakistan	7:13.98	C

=== Semifinals ===
First three places advance to Final A, the remainder to Final B.

==== Semifinal 1 ====
Rank	Rower	Country	Time	Notes
1	Tomasz Kucharski; Robert Sycz	Poland	6:20.60	A
2	Markus Gier; Michael Gier	Switzerland	6:23.08	A
3	Ingo Euler; Bernhard Rühling	Germany	6:24.55	A
4	Haimish Karrasch; Bruce Hick	Australia	6:25.20	B
5	Steve Tucker; Conal Groom	United States	6:32.86	B
6	Maarten van der Linden; Pepijn Aardewijn	Netherlands	6:43.80	B

==== Semifinal 2 ====
Rank	Rower	Country	Time	Notes
1	Pascal Touron, Thibaud Chapelle	France	6:21.32	A
2	Elia Luini, Leonardo Pettinari	Italy	6:21.59	A
3	Hitoshi Hase; Daisaku Takeda	Japan	6:23.37	A
4	Vasileios Polymeros; Panagiotis Miliotis	Greece	6:25.38	B
5	Romu Bouzas Rodriguez; Gerard Gomez Counahan	Mexico	6:33.62	B
6	Juan Zunzunegui; Rubén Álvarez	Spain	6:39.49	B

=== Finals ===
==== Final C ====
Rank	Rower	Country	Time	Notes
1	Ulf Lienhard; Sebastian Rodrigo Massa	Argentina	6:29.19	
2	Tom Kay; Tom Middleton	Great Britain	6:32.67	
3	Josef Källström; Anders Båtemyr	Sweden	6:34.11	
4	Sing Yan Lo; Kam Chi Lui	Hong Kong	6:49.19	
5	Zahid Ali Pirzada; Hazrat Islam	Pakistan	6:52.12	

==== Final B ====
Rank	Rower	Country	Time	Notes
1	Haimish Karrasch; Bruce Hick	Australia	6:26.21	
2	Vasileios Polymeros; Panagiotis Miliotis	Greece	6:27.79	
3	Juan Zunzunegui; Rubén Álvarez	Spain	6:31.49	
4	Romu Bouzas Rodriguez; Gerard Gomez Counahan	Mexico	6:31.70	
5	Steve Tucker; Conal Groom	United States	6:32.41	
6	Maarten van der Linden; Pepijn Aardewijn	Netherlands	6:43.80	

==== Final A ====
Rank	Rower	Country	Time	Notes
1st place, gold medalist(s)	Tomasz Kucharski; Robert Sycz	Poland	6:21.75	
2nd place, silver medalist(s)	Elia Luini, Leonardo Pettinari	Italy	6:23.47	
3rd place, bronze medalist(s)	Pascal Touron, Thibaud Chapelle	France	6:24.85	
4	Ingo Euler; Bernhard Rühling	Germany	6:26.54	
5	Markus Gier; Michael Gier	Switzerland	6:28.52	
6	Hitoshi Hase; Daisaku Takeda	Japan	6:29.74	
