= Rowing at the 2002 Asian Games – Men's eight =

Men's eight at the 2002 Asian Games
- Venue: Nakdong River
- Date: 30 September – 3 October 2002
- Competitors: 56 from 7 nations

Medalists
| gold medal | China; Chen Lingbu, Zhang Ningtao, Dong Wenfeng, Ma Weiguo, Tian Qiqiang, Chi Huanqi, Zhou Qiang, Li Xinghai, Zhang Dechang |
| silver medal | Japan; Daisaku Takeda, Hitoshi Hase, Akio Yano, Yasunori Tanabe, Kazushige Ura, Kazuaki Mimoto, Atsushi Obata, Kenji Miura, Takehiro Kubo |
| bronze medal | Uzbekistan; Vitaliy Silayev, Dmitriy Tikhonov, Nasrullo Nazarov, Bahadir Davletyarov, Ruslan Bichurin, Sergey Makshov, Vladimir Tremasov, Dmitriy Krivo, Sergey Yoqubov |

The men's eight competition at the 2002 Asian Games in Busan was held from 30 September to 3 October at the Nakdong River.

== Schedule ==
All times are Korea Standard Time (UTC+09:00)

| Date | Time | Event |
|---|---|---|
| Monday, 30 September 2002 | 13:40 | Heats |
| Tuesday, 1 October 2002 | 13:50 | Repechage |
| Thursday, 3 October 2002 | 13:00 | Final |

== Results ==
=== Heats ===
- Qualification: 1 → Final (FA), 2–4 → Repechage (R)

==== Heat 1 ====
| Rank | Team | Time | Notes |
|---|---|---|---|
| 1 | China (CHN); Chen Lingbu; Zhang Ningtao; Dong Wenfeng; Ma Weiguo; Tian Qiqiang; Chi Huanqi; Zhou Qiang; Li Xinghai; Zhang Dechang | 5:49.07 | FA |
| 2 | Chinese Taipei (TPE); Hsu Wei-chieh; Tseng Chien-feng; Tsai Ming-chang; Wu Chi-hsiu; Huang Yu-lung; Kung Tai-yuan; Kao Kun-cheng; Lin Jan-wei; Ping Chia-hao | 6:21.35 | R |
| 3 | Pakistan (PAK); Allah Rakha; Romay Khan; Muhammad Nazir; Azmat Javed; Muhammad Afzal; Zeeshan Majeed; Naseer Ahmed Tahir; Muhammad Adeel Sultan; Aslam Hayat | 7:57.40 | R |

==== Heat 2 ====
| Rank | Team | Time | Notes |
|---|---|---|---|
| 1 | Japan (JPN); Daisaku Takeda; Hitoshi Hase; Akio Yano; Yasunori Tanabe; Kazushige Ura; Kazuaki Mimoto; Atsushi Obata; Kenji Miura; Takehiro Kubo | 5:57.36 | FA |
| 2 | Uzbekistan (UZB); Vitaliy Silayev; Dmitriy Tikhonov; Nasrullo Nazarov; Bahadir Davletyarov; Ruslan Bichurin; Sergey Makshov; Vladimir Tremasov; Dmitriy Krivo; Sergey Yoqubov | 5:59.88 | R |
| 3 | India (IND); Roshan Lal; R. K. Pillai; Udaybir Singh; Jenil Krishnan; Inderpal Singh; Sunil Kakde; Kudrat Ali; Paulose Pandari Kunnel; K. V. Sajith | 6:04.18 | R |
| 4 | South Korea (KOR); Im Gyu-sam; Kim Dong-woan; Jun Byung-koo; Kim Nam-yeul; Kim Jin-gi; Lee Jae-yoon; Baek In-ho; Gang Dong-kyun; Ga Woo-hyun | 6:06.21 | R |

=== Repechage ===
- Qualification: 1–4 → Final (FA)

| Rank | Team | Time | Notes |
|---|---|---|---|
| 1 | Uzbekistan (UZB); Vitaliy Silayev; Dmitriy Tikhonov; Nasrullo Nazarov; Bahadir Davletyarov; Ruslan Bichurin; Sergey Makshov; Vladimir Tremasov; Dmitriy Krivo; Sergey Yoqubov | 6:00.08 | FA |
| 2 | South Korea (KOR); Im Gyu-sam; Kim Dong-woan; Jun Byung-koo; Kim Nam-yeul; Kim Jin-gi; Lee Jae-yoon; Baek In-ho; Gang Dong-kyun; Ga Woo-hyun | 6:02.74 | FA |
| 3 | India (IND); Roshan Lal; R. K. Pillai; Udaybir Singh; Jenil Krishnan; Inderpal Singh; Sunil Kakde; Kudrat Ali; Paulose Pandari Kunnel; K. V. Sajith | 6:08.61 | FA |
| 4 | Chinese Taipei (TPE); Hsu Wei-chieh; Tseng Chien-feng; Tsai Ming-chang; Wu Chi-hsiu; Huang Yu-lung; Kung Tai-yuan; Kao Kun-cheng; Lin Jan-wei; Ping Chia-hao | 6:17.83 | FA |
| 5 | Pakistan (PAK); Allah Rakha; Romay Khan; Muhammad Nazir; Azmat Javed; Muhammad Afzal; Zeeshan Majeed; Naseer Ahmed Tahir; Muhammad Adeel Sultan; Aslam Hayat | 6:23.64 | |

=== Final ===
| Rank | Team | Time |
|---|---|---|
| 1st place, gold medalist(s) | China (CHN); Chen Lingbu; Zhang Ningtao; Dong Wenfeng; Ma Weiguo; Tian Qiqiang; Chi Huanqi; Zhou Qiang; Li Xinghai; Zhang Dechang | 6:28.67 |
| 2nd place, silver medalist(s) | Japan (JPN); Daisaku Takeda; Hitoshi Hase; Akio Yano; Yasunori Tanabe; Kazushige Ura; Kazuaki Mimoto; Atsushi Obata; Kenji Miura; Takehiro Kubo | 6:37.25 |
| 3rd place, bronze medalist(s) | Uzbekistan (UZB); Vitaliy Silayev; Dmitriy Tikhonov; Nasrullo Nazarov; Bahadir Davletyarov; Ruslan Bichurin; Sergey Makshov; Vladimir Tremasov; Dmitriy Krivo; Sergey Yoqubov | 6:41.45 |
| 4 | South Korea (KOR); Im Gyu-sam; Kim Dong-woan; Jun Byung-koo; Kim Nam-yeul; Kim Jin-gi; Lee Jae-yoon; Baek In-ho; Gang Dong-kyun; Ga Woo-hyun | 6:52.27 |
| 5 | India (IND); Roshan Lal; R. K. Pillai; Udaybir Singh; Jenil Krishnan; Inderpal Singh; Sunil Kakde; Kudrat Ali; Paulose Pandari Kunnel; K. V. Sajith | 7:00.70 |
| 6 | Chinese Taipei (TPE); Hsu Wei-chieh; Tseng Chien-feng; Tsai Ming-chang; Wu Chi-hsiu; Huang Yu-lung; Kung Tai-yuan; Kao Kun-cheng; Lin Jan-wei; Ping Chia-hao | 7:20.29 |
