= Rowing at the 1998 Asian Games – Men's lightweight double sculls =

Men's lightweight double sculls at the 1998 Asian Games
- Venue: Map Prachan Reservoir
- Date: 16–18 December 1998
- Competitors: 20 from 10 nations

Medalists
gold medal	Gao Bingrong; Liu Jian	China
silver medal	Kazuaki Mimoto; Daisaku Takeda	Japan
bronze medal	Ri Chol-jin; Kim Song-chol	North Korea

The men's lightweight double sculls competition at the 1998 Asian Games was held from 16 to 18 December 1998 at Map Prachan Reservoir, Chonburi province.

== Schedule ==
All times are Indochina Time (UTC+07:00)

Date	Time	Event
Wednesday, 16 December 1998	07:00	Heats
Thursday, 17 December 1998	07:00	Repechages
Friday, 18 December 1998	07:00	Finals

== Results ==
Legend

- DSQ — Disqualified

=== Heats ===
- Qualification: 1 → Final A (FA), 2–5 → Repechages (R)

==== Heat 1 ====
Rank	Team	Time	Notes
1	China (CHN); Gao Bingrong; Liu Jian	6:37.09	FA
2	Japan (JPN); Kazuaki Mimoto; Daisaku Takeda	6:38.44	R
3	Thailand (THA); Piyadanai Pantangthai; Ruthtanaphol Theppibal	6:54.09	R
4	Philippines (PHI); Edgardo Maerina; Jose Rodriguez	6:59.30	R
5	Indonesia (INA); Jamaluddin; Rahmat	7:08.81	R

==== Heat 2 ====
Rank	Team	Time	Notes
1	North Korea (PRK); Ri Chol-jin; Kim Song-chol	6:52.73	FA
2	Pakistan (PAK); Shakeel Ahmed Dar; Zahid Ali Pirzada	7:01.77	R
3	Hong Kong (HKG); Lo Sing Yan; Lui Kam Chi	7:08.03	R
4	South Korea (KOR); Jo Jun-hyung; Yoon Sang-jin	7:08.12	R
5	Singapore (SIN); Raihan Omar; Roozaimy Omar	7:44.33	R

=== Repechages ===
- Qualification: 1–2 → Final A (FA), 3–4 → Final B (FB)

==== Repechage 1 ====
Rank	Team	Time	Notes
1	Japan (JPN); Kazuaki Mimoto; Daisaku Takeda	6:40.56	FA
2	Hong Kong (HKG); Lo Sing Yan; Lui Kam Chi	6:43.36	FA
3	Philippines (PHI); Edgardo Maerina; Jose Rodriguez	6:47.15	FB
4	Singapore (SIN); Raihan Omar; Roozaimy Omar	7:30.81	FB

==== Repechage 2 ====
Rank	Team	Time	Notes
1	Pakistan (PAK); Shakeel Ahmed Dar; Zahid Ali Pirzada	6:48.71	FA
2	Indonesia (INA); Jamaluddin; Rahmat	6:50.97	FA
3	South Korea (KOR); Jo Jun-hyung; Yoon Sang-jin	6:54.14	FB
—	Thailand (THA); Piyadanai Pantangthai; Ruthtanaphol Theppibal	DSQ	

=== Finals ===
==== Final B ====
Rank	Team	Time
1	Philippines (PHI); Edgardo Maerina; Jose Rodriguez	6:45.08
2	South Korea (KOR); Jo Jun-hyung; Yoon Sang-jin	7:00.32
3	Singapore (SIN); Raihan Omar; Roozaimy Omar	7:23.40

==== Final A ====
Rank	Team	Time
1st place, gold medalist(s)	China (CHN); Gao Bingrong; Liu Jian	6:24.04
2nd place, silver medalist(s)	Japan (JPN); Kazuaki Mimoto; Daisaku Takeda	6:26.55
3rd place, bronze medalist(s)	North Korea (PRK); Ri Chol-jin; Kim Song-chol	6:36.82
4	Hong Kong (HKG); Lo Sing Yan; Lui Kam Chi	6:42.71
5	Pakistan (PAK); Shakeel Ahmed Dar; Zahid Ali Pirzada	6:53.83
6	Indonesia (INA); Jamaluddin; Rahmat	6:57.52
