= Rowing at the 1998 Asian Games – Men's double sculls =

Men's double sculls at the 1998 Asian Games
- Venue: Map Prachan Reservoir
- Date: 16–19 December 1998
- Competitors: 20 from 10 nations

Medalists
gold medal	Cui Yonghui; Li Yang	China
silver medal	Kazuaki Mimoto; Daisaku Takeda	Japan
bronze medal	Kim Sun-yong; Ri Kye-jun	North Korea

The men's double sculls competition at the 1998 Asian Games was held from 16 to 19 December 1998 at Map Prachan Reservoir, Chonburi province.

== Schedule ==
All times are Indochina Time (UTC+07:00)

Date	Time	Event
Wednesday, 16 December 1998	07:00	Heats
Thursday, 17 December 1998	07:00	Repechages
Saturday, 19 December 1998	07:00	Finals

== Results ==
Legend

- DNS — Did not start

=== Heats ===
- Qualification: 1 → Final A (FA), 2–5 → Repechages (R)

==== Heat 1 ====
Rank	Team	Time	Notes
1	South Korea (KOR); Lee Ho; Lee In-soo	6:34.48	FA
2	Turkmenistan (TKM); Alekseý Çmatkow; Dmitriý Morozow	6:37.86	R
3	Kazakhstan (KAZ); Mikhail Garnik; Yevgeniy Latypov	6:39.19	R
4	Hong Kong (HKG); Lo Sing Yan; Lui Kam Chi	7:02.62	R
5	Thailand (THA); Surachai Romyasamit; Sarayut Soomboon	7:06.74	R

==== Heat 2 ====
Rank	Team	Time	Notes
1	China (CHN); Cui Yonghui; Li Yang	6:25.25	FA
2	Japan (JPN); Kazuaki Mimoto; Daisaku Takeda	6:27.03	R
3	Indonesia (INA); Muhammad Anwar; Lasmin	6:41.94	R
4	Pakistan (PAK); Azmat Javed; Muhammad Farooq	6:59.74	R
5	North Korea (PRK); Kim Sun-yong; Ri Kye-jun	7:00.20	R

=== Repechages ===
- Qualification: 1–2 → Final A (FA), 3–4 → Final B (FB)

==== Repechage 1 ====
Rank	Team	Time	Notes
1	North Korea (PRK); Kim Sun-yong; Ri Kye-jun	6:36.05	FA
2	Indonesia (INA); Muhammad Anwar; Lasmin	6:39.33	FA
3	Turkmenistan (TKM); Alekseý Çmatkow; Dmitriý Morozow	6:52.69	FB
4	Hong Kong (HKG); Lo Sing Yan; Lui Kam Chi	7:23.70	FB

==== Repechage 2 ====
Rank	Team	Time	Notes
1	Japan (JPN); Kazuaki Mimoto; Daisaku Takeda	6:46.19	FA
2	Kazakhstan (KAZ); Mikhail Garnik; Yevgeniy Latypov	6:48.44	FA
3	Pakistan (PAK); Azmat Javed; Muhammad Farooq	6:54.58	FB
4	Thailand (THA); Surachai Romyasamit; Sarayut Soomboon	7:06.76	FB

=== Finals ===
==== Final B ====
Rank	Team	Time
1	Hong Kong (HKG); Lo Sing Yan; Lui Kam Chi	6:55.59
2	Turkmenistan (TKM); Alekseý Çmatkow; Dmitriý Morozow	6:55.83
3	Pakistan (PAK); Azmat Javed; Muhammad Farooq	7:17.28
4	Thailand (THA); Surachai Romyasamit; Sarayut Soomboon	7:22.30

==== Final A ====
Rank	Team	Time
1st place, gold medalist(s)	China (CHN); Cui Yonghui; Li Yang	6:39.05
2nd place, silver medalist(s)	Japan (JPN); Kazuaki Mimoto; Daisaku Takeda	6:41.64
3rd place, bronze medalist(s)	North Korea (PRK); Kim Sun-yong; Ri Kye-jun	6:50.27
4	Indonesia (INA); Muhammad Anwar; Lasmin	6:50.70
5	Kazakhstan (KAZ); Mikhail Garnik; Yevgeniy Latypov	7:01.04
6	South Korea (KOR); Lee Ho; Lee In-soo	7:04.32
