= Rowing at the 1998 Asian Games – Men's lightweight coxless four =

Men's lightweight coxless four at the 1998 Asian Games
- Venue: Map Prachan Reservoir
- Date: 18 December 1998
- Competitors: 24 from 6 nations

Medalists
gold medal	China; Liu Zewu, Zhou Guoyang, Wang Xutao, Mao Zhixing
silver medal	Japan; Yoshitomo Kitanoue, Atsushi Obata, Hiroya Sato, Kazushige Ura
bronze medal	India; B. K. K. Thankachan, Rampal Singh, Pappi Singh, Kasam Khan

The men's lightweight coxless four competition at the 1998 Asian Games was held on 18 December 1998 at Map Prachan Reservoir, Chonburi province.

== Schedule ==
All times are Indochina Time (UTC+07:00)

Date	Time	Event
Friday, 18 December 1998	07:00	Final

== Results ==
Rank	Team	Time
1st place, gold medalist(s)	China (CHN); Liu Zewu; Zhou Guoyang; Wang Xutao; Mao Zhixing	5:56.32
2nd place, silver medalist(s)	Japan (JPN); Yoshitomo Kitanoue; Atsushi Obata; Hiroya Sato; Kazushige Ura	6:00.13
3rd place, bronze medalist(s)	India (IND); B. K. K. Thankachan; Rampal Singh; Pappi Singh; Kasam Khan	6:11.48
4	North Korea (PRK); Kim Kyong-jin; Yon Jong-hyok; Kim Kyong-sul; Kim Kwang-ho	6:13.60
5	Philippines (PHI); Alvin Amposta; Joseph Mendoza; Nestor Cordova; Joel Bagasbas	6:24.68
6	Thailand (THA); Chaiwut Eamsamai; Nophadol Sanenan; T. Pongsrapang; Somjit Kangnok	6:38.56
