= Rowing at the 2002 Asian Games – Men's lightweight coxless four =

Men's lightweight coxless four at the 2002 Asian Games
- Venue: Nakdong River
- Date: 30 September – 3 October 2002
- Competitors: 28 from 7 nations

Medalists
gold medal	China; Wang Linfei, Li Haitao, Huang Zhigang, Zhang Guoyang
silver medal	Japan; Akio Yano, Kazuaki Mimoto, Takehiro Kubo, Atsushi Obata
bronze medal	Indonesia; Rodiaman, Rahmat, Agus Budi Aji, Aldino Maryandi

The men's lightweight coxless four competition at the 2002 Asian Games in Busan was held from 30 September to 3 October at the Nakdong River.

== Schedule ==
All times are Korea Standard Time (UTC+09:00)

Date	Time	Event
Monday, 30 September 2002	11:50	Heats
Tuesday, 1 October 2002	11:50	Repechage
Thursday, 3 October 2002	10:00	Final

== Results ==
=== Heats ===
- Qualification: 1 → Final (FA), 2–4 → Repechage (R)

==== Heat 1 ====
Rank	Team	Time	Notes
1	Japan (JPN); Akio Yano; Kazuaki Mimoto; Takehiro Kubo; Atsushi Obata	6:16.92	FA
2	Chinese Taipei (TPE); Tseng Chien-feng; Tsai Ming-chang; Lin Jan-wei; Huang Yu-lung	6:20.64	R
3	Sri Lanka (SRI); Kushantha Jeerasinghe; Chanaka Talpahewa; Nirmal Aluwihare; Chrishan Aluwihare	7:17.77	R

==== Heat 2 ====
Rank	Team	Time	Notes
1	China (CHN); Wang Linfei; Li Haitao; Huang Zhigang; Zhang Guoyang	6:13.52	FA
2	Indonesia (INA); Rodiaman; Rahmat; Agus Budi Aji; Aldino Maryandi	6:18.76	R
3	India (IND); Mujeeb Rehman Kolakkodan; Ratheesh Kumar; Saji Thomas; Kasam Khan	6:25.19	R
4	South Korea (KOR); Won You-chan; Lee Jung-won; Yoon Won-il; Eun Sang-gi	6:42.61	R

=== Repechage ===
- Qualification: 1–4 → Final (FA)

Rank	Team	Time	Notes
1	India (IND); Mujeeb Rehman Kolakkodan; Ratheesh Kumar; Saji Thomas; Kasam Khan	6:20.49	FA
2	Indonesia (INA); Rodiaman; Rahmat; Agus Budi Aji; Aldino Maryandi	6:21.21	FA
3	Chinese Taipei (TPE); Tseng Chien-feng; Tsai Ming-chang; Lin Jan-wei; Huang Yu-lung	6:27.24	FA
4	South Korea (KOR); Won You-chan; Lee Jung-won; Yoon Won-il; Eun Sang-gi	6:31.29	FA
5	Sri Lanka (SRI); Kushantha Jeerasinghe; Chanaka Talpahewa; Nirmal Aluwihare; Chrishan Aluwihare	6:59.63	

=== Final ===
Rank	Team	Time
1st place, gold medalist(s)	China (CHN); Wang Linfei; Li Haitao; Huang Zhigang; Zhang Guoyang	6:08.80
2nd place, silver medalist(s)	Japan (JPN); Akio Yano; Kazuaki Mimoto; Takehiro Kubo; Atsushi Obata	6:14.57
3rd place, bronze medalist(s)	Indonesia (INA); Rodiaman; Rahmat; Agus Budi Aji; Aldino Maryandi	6:17.75
4	India (IND); Mujeeb Rehman Kolakkodan; Ratheesh Kumar; Saji Thomas; Kasam Khan	6:20.05
5	Chinese Taipei (TPE); Tseng Chien-feng; Tsai Ming-chang; Lin Jan-wei; Huang Yu-lung	6:24.34
6	South Korea (KOR); Won You-chan; Lee Jung-won; Yoon Won-il; Eun Sang-gi	6:36.47
