= Thibaud Chapelle =

French rower (born 1977)

Medal record

Men's rowing

Representing France

Olympic Games
Bronze medal – third place	2000 Sydney	Lightweight double sculls

World Rowing Championships
Bronze medal – third place	2001 Lucerne	LM2x

Thibaud Chapelle (born 9 May 1977 in Bron) is a French rower who has won medals in the Olympic Games and World Championships with the French Rowing Team.

== Awards ==
Chapelle has won a number of awards through his rowing career. Among his awards are Olympic medals that he earned while rowing with the French National Rowing Team.

=== Olympic Games ===
Chapelle won just one medal in the Olympic Games. That is below:

2000, Sydney, Australia – Chapelle won a Bronze medal in lightweight double sculls with Pascal Touron.

=== World Championships ===
Chapelle has won one medal in the World Championships. They are below:

2001, Lucerne, Switzerland – Chapelle won a bronze medal in lightweight double sculls with Fabrice Moreau.

=== French/France Championships ===
Chapelle won 2 medals. This was in the French/France Championships. The medals are below:

Chapelle was skiff champion France in 2001 and 2002.
