= Rowing at the 2002 Asian Games – Men's lightweight double sculls =

Men's lightweight double sculls at the 2002 Asian Games
- Venue: Nakdong River
- Date: 30 September – 3 October 2002
- Competitors: 20 from 10 nations

Medalists
gold medal	Daisaku Takeda; Kazushige Ura	Japan
silver medal	Yang Maozong; Chen Hong	China
bronze medal	Alvin Amposta; Nestor Cordova	Philippines

The men's lightweight double sculls competition at the 2002 Asian Games in Busan was held from 30 September to 3 October at the Nakdong River.

== Schedule ==
All times are Korea Standard Time (UTC+09:00)

Date	Time	Event
Monday, 30 September 2002	12:50	Heats
Tuesday, 1 October 2002	12:50	Repechages
Thursday, 3 October 2002	10:45	Finals

== Results ==
Legend

- DNS — Did not start

=== Heats ===
- Qualification: 1 → Final A (FA), 2–5 → Repechages (R)

==== Heat 1 ====
Rank	Team	Time	Notes
1	Japan (JPN); Daisaku Takeda; Kazushige Ura	6:49.26	FA
2	Indonesia (INA); Muhammad Anwar; Jamaluddin	6:55.74	R
3	North Korea (PRK); Jo Wan-guk; Yon Jong-hyok	6:58.51	R
4	South Korea (KOR); Kim Woo-sik; Go Jong-hyun	7:02.46	R
5	Chinese Taipei (TPE); Wu Chi-hsiu; Ping Chia-hao	7:09.60	R

==== Heat 2 ====
Rank	Team	Time	Notes
1	China (CHN); Yang Maozong; Chen Hong	6:41.32	FA
2	Philippines (PHI); Alvin Amposta; Nestor Cordova	6:44.95	R
3	Hong Kong (HKG); Lo Sing Yan; Li Ho Yin	7:03.47	R
4	Kuwait (KUW); Essa Al-Failakawi; Abdullah Al-Muhanna	7:46.73	R
5	Sri Lanka (SRI); Hewa Amaradasa; Nimal Shantha	8:03.48	R

=== Repechages ===
- Qualification: 1–2 → Final A (FA), 3–5 → Final B (FB)

==== Repechage A ====
Rank	Team	Time	Notes
1	Indonesia (INA); Muhammad Anwar; Jamaluddin	6:57.42	FA
2	Hong Kong (HKG); Lo Sing Yan; Li Ho Yin	6:58.93	FA
3	South Korea (KOR); Kim Woo-sik; Go Jong-hyun	7:03.97	FB
4	Sri Lanka (SRI); Hewa Amaradasa; Nimal Shantha	8:05.83	FB

==== Repechage B ====
Rank	Team	Time	Notes
1	Philippines (PHI); Alvin Amposta; Nestor Cordova	6:54.04	FA
2	North Korea (PRK); Jo Wan-guk; Yon Jong-hyok	6:59.47	FA
3	Kuwait (KUW); Essa Al-Failakawi; Abdullah Al-Muhanna	7:56.70	FB
—	Chinese Taipei (TPE); Wu Chi-hsiu; Ping Chia-hao	DNS	

=== Finals ===
==== Final B ====
Rank	Team	Time
1	South Korea (KOR); Kim Woo-sik; Go Jong-hyun	7:08.69
2	Kuwait (KUW); Essa Al-Failakawi; Abdullah Al-Muhanna	7:47.58
3	Sri Lanka (SRI); Hewa Amaradasa; Nimal Shantha	8:12.30

==== Final A ====
Rank	Team	Time
1st place, gold medalist(s)	Japan (JPN); Daisaku Takeda; Kazushige Ura	7:00.50
2nd place, silver medalist(s)	China (CHN); Yang Maozong; Chen Hong	7:11.00
3rd place, bronze medalist(s)	Philippines (PHI); Alvin Amposta; Nestor Cordova	7:17.84
4	North Korea (PRK); Jo Wan-guk; Yon Jong-hyok	7:22.84
5	Hong Kong (HKG); Lo Sing Yan; Li Ho Yin	7:26.23
6	Indonesia (INA); Muhammad Anwar; Jamaluddin	7:29.94
