= Rowing at the 2002 Asian Games – Men's lightweight single sculls =

Men's lightweight single sculls at the 2002 Asian Games
- Venue: Nakdong River
- Date: 30 September – 2 October 2002
- Competitors: 12 from 12 nations

Medalists
gold medal	Zhu Zhifu	China
silver medal	Hitoshi Hase	Japan
bronze medal	Law Hiu Fung	Hong Kong

The men's lightweight single sculls competition at the 2002 Asian Games in Busan was held from 30 September to 2 October at the Nakdong River.

== Schedule ==
All times are Korea Standard Time (UTC+09:00)

Date	Time	Event
Monday, 30 September 2002	10:00	Heats
Tuesday, 1 October 2002	10:00	Repechages
Wednesday, 2 October 2002	10:00	Finals

== Results ==
=== Heats ===
- Qualification: 1 → Final A (FA), 2–6 → Repechages (R)

==== Heat 1 ====
Rank	Athlete	Time	Notes
1	Jose Rodriguez (PHI)	7:32.14	FA
2	Kang Jin-chol (PRK)	7:41.19	R
3	Ping Chia-hao (TPE)	7:42.65	R
4	Ivan Kharitonov (KAZ)	7:46.98	R
5	Hewa Amaradasa (SRI)	8:31.19	R
6	Hamad Al-Wahaib (KUW)	8:38.03	R

==== Heat 2 ====
Rank	Athlete	Time	Notes
1	Hitoshi Hase (JPN)	7:13.29	FA
2	Zhu Zhifu (CHN)	7:16.27	R
3	Law Hiu Fung (HKG)	7:25.88	R
4	Jamaluddin (INA)	7:32.91	R
5	Muhammad Akram (PAK)	7:40.85	R
6	Kim Hyun-ho (KOR)	7:42.21	R

=== Repechages ===
- Qualification: 1–2 → Final A (FA), 3–5 → Final B (FB)

==== Repechage A ====
Rank	Athlete	Time	Notes
1	Law Hiu Fung (HKG)	7:14.03	FA
2	Muhammad Akram (PAK)	7:20.67	FA
3	Kang Jin-chol (PRK)	7:21.51	FB
4	Ivan Kharitonov (KAZ)	7:39.08	FB
5	Hewa Amaradasa (SRI)	8:31.99	FB

==== Repechage B ====
Rank	Athlete	Time	Notes
1	Zhu Zhifu (CHN)	7:10.17	FA
2	Jamaluddin (INA)	7:24.86	FA
3	Kim Hyun-ho (KOR)	7:27.60	FB
4	Ping Chia-hao (TPE)	7:38.94	FB
5	Hamad Al-Wahaib (KUW)	8:31.86	FB

=== Finals ===
==== Final B ====
Rank	Athlete	Time
1	Kang Jin-chol (PRK)	7:30.97
2	Kim Hyun-ho (KOR)	7:34.28
3	Ping Chia-hao (TPE)	7:38.86
4	Ivan Kharitonov (KAZ)	7:51.89
5	Hewa Amaradasa (SRI)	8:42.66
6	Hamad Al-Wahaib (KUW)	11:24.04

==== Final A ====
Rank	Athlete	Time
1st place, gold medalist(s)	Zhu Zhifu (CHN)	7:12.55
2nd place, silver medalist(s)	Hitoshi Hase (JPN)	7:16.53
3rd place, bronze medalist(s)	Law Hiu Fung (HKG)	7:24.05
4	Jose Rodriguez (PHI)	7:26.13
5	Jamaluddin (INA)	7:27.80
6	Muhammad Akram (PAK)	7:37.59
