= Rowing at the 2010 Asian Games – Men's single sculls =

Men's single sculls at the 2010 Asian Games
- Venue: Guangzhou International Rowing Centre
- Date: 15–19 November 2010
- Competitors: 10 from 10 nations

Medalists
gold medal	Bajrang Lal Takhar	India
silver medal	Wang Ming-hui	Chinese Taipei
bronze medal	Haider Nawzad	Iraq

The men's single sculls competition at the 2010 Asian Games in Guangzhou, China was held from 15 November to 19 November at the International Rowing Centre.

== Schedule ==
All times are China Standard Time (UTC+08:00)

Date	Time	Event
Monday, 15 November 2010	10:10	Heats
Wednesday, 17 November 2010	10:00	Repechage
Friday, 19 November 2010	10:10	Finals

== Results ==
Legend

- DNS — Did not start

=== Heats ===
- Qualification: 1–2 → Final A (FA), 3–5 → Repechage (R)

==== Heat 1 ====
Rank	Athlete	Time	Notes
1	Bajrang Lal Takhar (IND)	7:02.45	FA
2	Wang Ming-hui (TPE)	7:04.91	FA
3	Law Hiu Fung (HKG)	7:09.19	R
4	Lee Sang-min (KOR)	7:10.28	R
5	Taher Kaboutari (IRI)	7:27.01	R

==== Heat 2 ====
Rank	Athlete	Time	Notes
1	Vladimir Chernenko (UZB)	7:11.04	FA
2	Haider Nawzad (IRQ)	7:12.02	FA
3	Anang Mulyana (INA)	7:13.04	R
4	Ali Jallouf (QAT)	8:27.03	R
5	Anas Al-Yaqout (IOC)	9:08.05	R

=== Repechage ===
- Qualification: 1–2 → Final A (FA), 3–6 → Final B (FB)

Rank	Athlete	Time	Notes
1	Law Hiu Fung (HKG)	7:12.56	FA
2	Lee Sang-min (KOR)	7:13.91	FA
3	Taher Kaboutari (IRI)	7:22.94	FB
4	Anang Mulyana (INA)	7:27.62	FB
5	Ali Jallouf (QAT)	8:26.18	FB
—	Anas Al-Yaqout (IOC)	DNS	

=== Finals ===
==== Final B ====
Rank	Athlete	Time
1	Taher Kaboutari (IRI)	7:18.05
2	Anang Mulyana (INA)	7:25.25
3	Ali Jallouf (QAT)	8:19.26

==== Final A ====
Rank	Athlete	Time
1st place, gold medalist(s)	Bajrang Lal Takhar (IND)	7:04.78
2nd place, silver medalist(s)	Wang Ming-hui (TPE)	7:07.33
3rd place, bronze medalist(s)	Haider Nawzad (IRQ)	7:10.10
4	Vladimir Chernenko (UZB)	7:13.73
5	Law Hiu Fung (HKG)	7:13.95
6	Lee Sang-min (KOR)	7:14.86
