= Zunzunegui =

Zunzunegui is a Basque surname from Gipuzkoa and Navarra, Spain.

== Notable people with this last name ==
- Fernando Zunzunegui (1943–2014), Spanish footballer
- Haritz Zunzunegui (born 1975), Spanish cross-country skier
- Juan Zunzunegui (born 1976), Spanish rower
- Juan Carlos Guerra Zunzunegui (died 2020), Spanish lawyer and politician
