= Riadh Ben Khedher =

Tunisian rower

Personal information
- Nationality: Tunisian
- Born: 26 September 1976 (age 48)

Sport
- Sport: Rowing

Riadh Ben Khedher (born 26 September 1976) is a Tunisian rower. He competed in the men's single sculls event at the 2000 Summer Olympics.
