= Rowing at the 2002 Asian Games – Women's coxless pair =

Women's coxless pair at the 2002 Asian Games
- Venue: Nakdong River
- Date: 3 October 2002
- Competitors: 10 from 5 nations

Medalists
gold medal	Zhang Xiuyun; Yang Cuiping	China
silver medal	Sevara Ganieva; Anna Kuznetsova	Uzbekistan
bronze medal	Beak Sun-mi; Kim Kyoung-mi	South Korea

The women's coxless pair competition at the 2002 Asian Games in Busan was held on 3 October 2002 at the Nakdong River.

== Schedule ==
All times are Korea Standard Time (UTC+09:00)

Date	Time	Event
Thursday, 3 October 2002	11:45	Final

== Results ==
Rank	Team	Time
1st place, gold medalist(s)	China (CHN); Zhang Xiuyun; Yang Cuiping	8:44.21
2nd place, silver medalist(s)	Uzbekistan (UZB); Sevara Ganieva; Anna Kuznetsova	8:52.83
3rd place, bronze medalist(s)	South Korea (KOR); Beak Sun-mi; Kim Kyoung-mi	8:57.35
4	Chinese Taipei (TPE); Chi Yao-hsuan; Yu Chen-chun	9:17.00
5	India (IND); Julee Varghese; Sobini Rajan	9:29.07
