= Rowing at the 1998 Asian Games – Women's single sculls =

Women's single sculls at the 1998 Asian Games
- Venue: Map Prachan Reservoir
- Date: 16–19 December 1998
- Competitors: 7 from 7 nations

Medalists
gold medal	Zhang Xiuyun	China
silver medal	Fenella Ng	Hong Kong
bronze medal	Junko Kano	Japan

The women's single sculls competition at the 1998 Asian Games was held from 16 to 19 December 1998 at Map Prachan Reservoir, Chonburi province.

== Schedule ==
All times are Indochina Time (UTC+07:00)

Date	Time	Event
Wednesday, 16 December 1998	07:00	Heats
Thursday, 17 December 1998	07:00	Repechage
Saturday, 19 December 1998	07:00	Final

== Results ==
=== Heats ===
- Qualification: 1 → Final A (FA), 2–4 → Repechage (R)

==== Heat 1 ====
Rank	Athlete	Time	Notes
1	Fenella Ng (HKG)	7:50.93	FA
2	Junko Kano (JPN)	8:02.70	R
3	So Mi-roung (KOR)	8:23.90	R
4	Phimpaka Thednum (THA)	8:30.75	R

==== Heat 2 ====
Rank	Athlete	Time	Notes
1	Zhang Xiuyun (CHN)	8:04.94	FA
2	Penelope Foo (SIN)	8:30.16	R
3	Chen Li-chao (TPE)	9:03.26	R

=== Repechage ===
- Qualification: 1–4 → Final A (FA)

Rank	Athlete	Time	Notes
1	So Mi-roung (KOR)	8:31.11	FA
2	Penelope Foo (SIN)	8:31.27	FA
3	Phimpaka Thednum (THA)	8:33.71	FA
4	Junko Kano (JPN)	8:37.59	FA
5	Chen Li-chao (TPE)	8:41.55	

=== Final ===
Rank	Athlete	Time
1st place, gold medalist(s)	Zhang Xiuyun (CHN)	7:48.58
2nd place, silver medalist(s)	Fenella Ng (HKG)	8:01.14
3rd place, bronze medalist(s)	Junko Kano (JPN)	8:06.42
4	So Mi-roung (KOR)	8:30.95
5	Penelope Foo (SIN)	8:47.96
6	Phimpaka Thednum (THA)	8:52.29
