= Rowing at the 2002 Asian Games – Men's single sculls =

Men's single sculls at the 2002 Asian Games
- Venue: Nakdong River
- Date: 30 September – 2 October 2002
- Competitors: 8 from 8 nations

Medalists
gold medal	Cui Yonghui	China
silver medal	Law Hiu Fung	Hong Kong
bronze medal	Muhammad Akram	Pakistan

The men's single sculls competition at the 2002 Asian Games in Busan was held from 30 September to 2 October at the Nakdong River.

== Schedule ==
All times are Korea Standard Time (UTC+09:00)

Date	Time	Event
Monday, 30 September 2002	11:10	Heats
Tuesday, 1 October 2002	11:30	Repechage
Wednesday, 2 October 2002	12:00	Finals

== Results ==
=== Heats ===
- Qualification: 1 → Final A (FA), 2–4 → Repechage (R)

==== Heat 1 ====
Rank	Athlete	Time	Notes
1	Yasunori Tanabe (JPN)	7:20.38	FA
2	Benjamin Tolentino (PHI)	7:22.22	R
3	Alexandr Ussachev (KAZ)	7:54.87	R
4	Raed Al-Failakawi (KUW)	8:24.82	R

==== Heat 2 ====
Rank	Athlete	Time	Notes
1	Cui Yonghui (CHN)	7:20.55	FA
2	Law Hiu Fung (HKG)	7:26.30	R
3	Muhammad Akram (PAK)	7:31.77	R
4	Lee Gang-wook (KOR)	7:33.87	R

=== Repechage ===
- Qualification: 1–4 → Final A (FA), 5–6 → Final B (FB)

Rank	Athlete	Time	Notes
1	Benjamin Tolentino (PHI)	7:22.44	FA
2	Law Hiu Fung (HKG)	7:25.57	FA
3	Muhammad Akram (PAK)	7:28.77	FA
4	Lee Gang-wook (KOR)	7:29.40	FA
5	Alexandr Ussachev (KAZ)	8:01.21	FB
6	Raed Al-Failakawi (KUW)	8:27.48	FB

=== Finals ===
==== Final B ====
Rank	Athlete	Time
1	Alexandr Ussachev (KAZ)	9:18.70
2	Raed Al-Failakawi (KUW)	10:30.81

==== Final A ====
Rank	Athlete	Time
1st place, gold medalist(s)	Cui Yonghui (CHN)	8:19.40
2nd place, silver medalist(s)	Law Hiu Fung (HKG)	8:31.48
3rd place, bronze medalist(s)	Muhammad Akram (PAK)	8:40.57
4	Benjamin Tolentino (PHI)	8:46.61
5	Lee Gang-wook (KOR)	8:56.49
6	Yasunori Tanabe (JPN)	9:27.63
