= Gerardo Gómez (rower) =

Mexican rower (born 1976)

Personal information
- Born: 3 April 1976 (age 48); Mexico City, Mexico

Sport
- Sport: Rowing

Gerardo Gómez (born 3 April 1976) is a Mexican rower. He competed in the men's lightweight double sculls event at the 2000 Summer Olympics.
