= Tom Middleton (rower) =

British rower

Personal information
- Nationality: British
- Born: 2 September 1976 (age 48); Oxford, England

Sport
- Sport: Rowing

Tom Middleton (born 2 September 1976) is a British rower. He competed in the men's lightweight double sculls event at the 2000 Summer Olympics.
