= Rafik Amrane =

Algerian rower

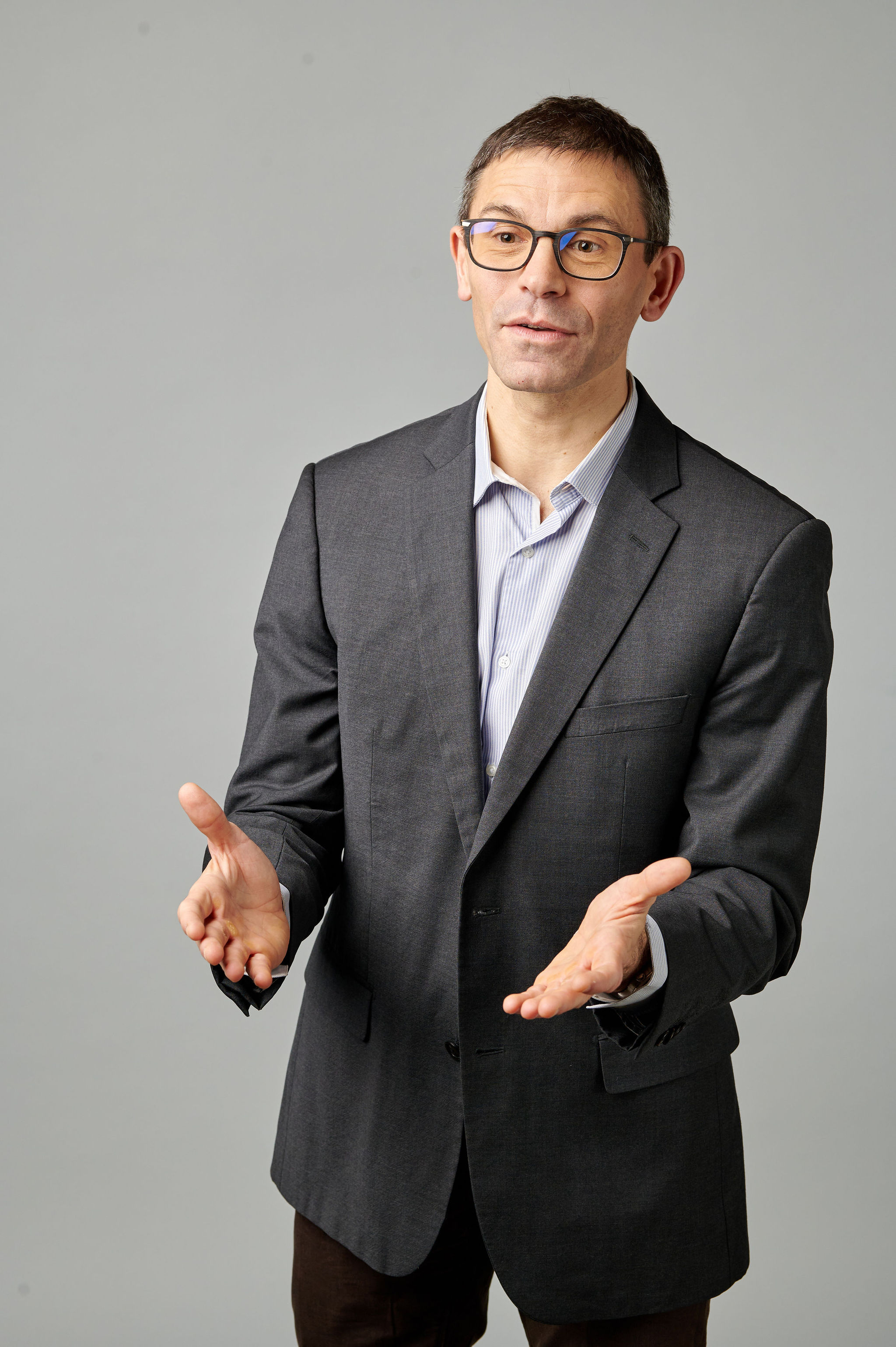
- Rafik Amrane in 2022

Personal information
- Nationality: Algerian
- Born: 25 April 1977 (age 48); Algiers, Algeria

Sport
- Sport: Rowing

Rafik Amrane (born 25 April 1977) is an Algerian rower. He competed in the men's single sculls event at the 2000 Summer Olympics.
