= Anders Båtemyr =

Swedish rower

Personal information
- Full name: Anders Ingemar Båtemyr
- Nationality: Swedish
- Born: 27 February 1974 (age 51); Strömstad, Sweden

Sport
- Sport: Rowing

Anders Ingemar Båtemyr (born 27 February 1974) is a Swedish rower. He competed in the men's lightweight double sculls event at the 2000 Summer Olympics.
