= Rómulo Bouzas =

Mexican rower (born 1978)

Personal information
- Full name: Rómulo Bouzas Rodríguez
- Born: 28 February 1978 (age 48) Mexico City, Mexico

Sport
- Sport: Rowing
Medal record
Men's rowing
Representing Mexico
Pan American Games
Silver medal – second place	1999 Winnipeg	Lwt coxless four

Rómulo Bouzas Rodríguez (Note: In this Spanish name, the first or paternal surname is Bouzas and the second or maternal family name is Rodríguez.) (born 28 February 1978) is a Mexican former rower. He competed in the men's lightweight double sculls event at the 2000 Summer Olympics.
