= Dmitry Ovechko =

Russian rower

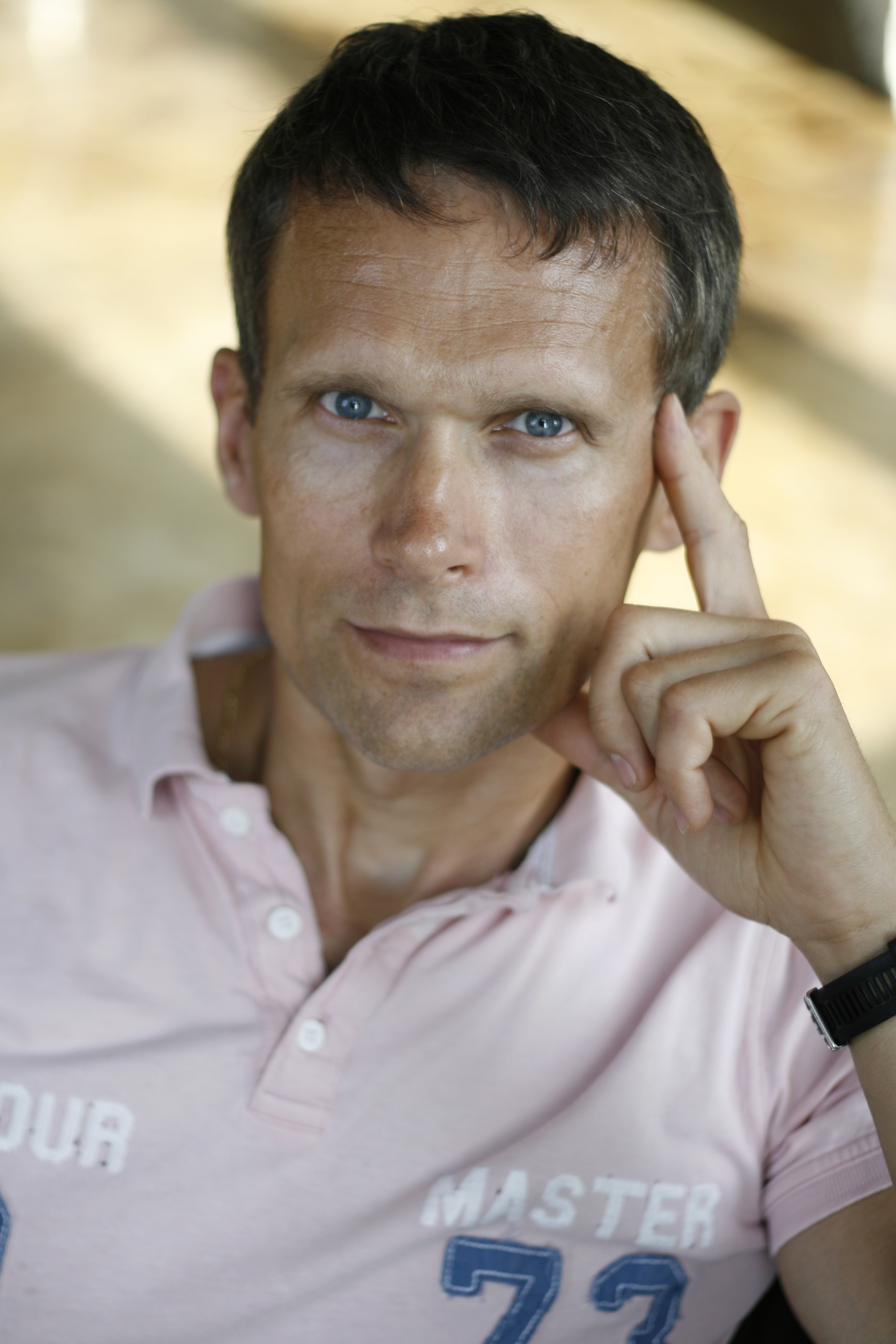

Personal information
- Full name: Dmitry Vitalyevich Ovechko
- Nationality: Russian
- Born: 4 February 1971 (age 55) Chelyabinsk, Russia

Sport
- Sport: Rowing

Dmitry Ovechko (born 4 February 1971) is a Russian rower. He competed in the men's lightweight double sculls event at the 2000 Summer Olympics.
