= Sergey Dmitryaychev =

Russian rower

Personal information
- Nationality: Russian
- Born: 25 August 1975 (age 49); Kaluga, Russia

Sport
- Sport: Rowing

Sergey Dmitryaychev (born 25 August 1975) is a Russian rower. He competed in the men's lightweight double sculls event at the 2000 Summer Olympics.
