= Rowing at the 1998 Asian Games – Men's lightweight single sculls =

Men's lightweight single sculls at the 1998 Asian Games
- Venue: Map Prachan Reservoir
- Date: 16–19 December 1998
- Competitors: 10 from 10 nations

Medalists
gold medal	Hua Lingjun	China
silver medal	Kim Il-yong	North Korea
bronze medal	Muhammad Akram	Pakistan

The men's lightweight single sculls competition at the 1998 Asian Games was held from 16 to 19 December 1998 at Map Prachan Reservoir, Chonburi province.

== Schedule ==
All times are Indochina Time (UTC+07:00)

Date	Time	Event
Wednesday, 16 December 1998	07:00	Heats
Thursday, 17 December 1998	07:00	Repechages
Saturday, 19 December 1998	07:00	Finals

== Results ==
Legend

- DNS — Did not start

=== Heats ===
- Qualification: 1 → Final A (FA), 2–5 → Repechages (R)

==== Heat 1 ====
Rank	Athlete	Time	Notes
1	Muhammad Akram (PAK)	7:15.15	FA
2	Piyadanai Pantangthai (THA)	7:19.99	R
3	Konstantin Pak (UZB)	7:31.85	R
4	Jo Jun-hyung (KOR)	7:45.15	R
5	Raihan Omar (SIN)	8:04.91	R

==== Heat 2 ====
Rank	Athlete	Time	Notes
1	Hua Lingjun (CHN)	7:07.93	FA
2	Kim Il-yong (PRK)	7:15.52	R
3	Jamaluddin (INA)	7:17.83	R
4	Chau Fung Yau (HKG)	7:24.18	R
5	Alekseý Çmatkow (TKM)	7:27.04	R

=== Repechages ===
- Qualification: 1–2 → Final A (FA), 3–4 → Final B (FB)

==== Repechage 1 ====
Rank	Athlete	Time	Notes
1	Kim Il-yong (PRK)	7:21.80	FA
2	Chau Fung Yau (HKG)	7:24.46	FA
3	Konstantin Pak (UZB)	7:29.27	FB
4	Raihan Omar (SIN)	8:14.92	FB

==== Repechage 2 ====
Rank	Athlete	Time	Notes
1	Jamaluddin (INA)	7:15.76	FA
2	Alekseý Çmatkow (TKM)	7:18.44	FA
3	Piyadanai Pantangthai (THA)	7:29.88	FB
4	Jo Jun-hyung (KOR)	7:43.92	FB

=== Finals ===
==== Final B ====
Rank	Athlete	Time
1	Konstantin Pak (UZB)	7:31.56
2	Piyadanai Pantangthai (THA)	7:32.59
3	Raihan Omar (SIN)	8:06.80
—	Jo Jun-hyung (KOR)	DNS

==== Final A ====
Rank	Athlete	Time
1st place, gold medalist(s)	Hua Lingjun (CHN)	7:08.22
2nd place, silver medalist(s)	Kim Il-yong (PRK)	7:13.84
3rd place, bronze medalist(s)	Muhammad Akram (PAK)	7:18.38
4	Jamaluddin (INA)	7:24.24
5	Alekseý Çmatkow (TKM)	7:27.49
6	Chau Fung Yau (HKG)	7:32.71
