= Panagiotis Miliotis =

Greek rower (born 1965)

Personal information
- Nationality: Greek
- Born: 16 April 1965 (age 59); Ioannina, Greece

Sport
- Sport: Rowing

Panagiotis Miliotis (born 16 April 1965) is a Greek rower. He competed in the men's lightweight double sculls event at the 2000 Summer Olympics.
