= Gerard Egelmeers =

Dutch Olympic rower (born 1969)

Gerardus Paul Maria "Gerard" Egelmeers
Personal information
- Nationality: Dutch
- Born: 1 May 1969 (age 55); Veldhoven
- Height: 183 cm (6 ft 0 in)
- Weight: 82 kg (181 lb)

Sport
- Country: Netherlands
- Sport: Rowing

Gerard Egelmeers is a Dutch former Olympic rower. He represented his country in the men's single sculls at the 2000 Summer Olympics. His time was a 7:05.48/7:04.25 in the qualifiers/repechage, a 7:07.14 in the semifinals, and a 6:55.29 in the finals.
