= Rowing at the 1998 Asian Games – Women's coxless four =

Women's coxless four at the 1998 Asian Games
- Venue: Map Prachan Reservoir
- Date: 19 December 1998
- Competitors: 24 from 6 nations

Medalists
gold medal	China; Liu Lijuan, Yang Limei, Sun Guangxia, Liu Xiaochun
silver medal	Kazakhstan; Irina Dmitriyeva, Natalya Orlova, Vera Nabiyeva, Vera Filimonova
bronze medal	Chinese Taipei; Chen Li-chao, Yu Chen-chun, Feng Mei-hua, Chiu Hui-chen

The women's coxless four competition at the 1998 Asian Games was held on 19 December 1998 at Map Prachan Reservoir, Chonburi province.

== Schedule ==
All times are Indochina Time (UTC+07:00)

Date	Time	Event
Saturday, 19 December 1998	07:00	Final

== Results ==
Legend

- DSQ — Disqualified

Rank	Team	Time
1st place, gold medalist(s)	China (CHN); Liu Lijuan; Yang Limei; Sun Guangxia; Liu Xiaochun	7:07.75
2nd place, silver medalist(s)	Kazakhstan (KAZ); Irina Dmitriyeva; Natalya Orlova; Vera Nabiyeva; Vera Filimonova	7:18.67
3rd place, bronze medalist(s)	Chinese Taipei (TPE); Chen Li-chao; Yu Chen-chun; Feng Mei-hua; Chiu Hui-chen	7:26.86
4	Uzbekistan (UZB); Nataliya Bogitova; Zarifa Sisinbaeva; Anastasiya Orehova; Sevara Ganieva	7:45.69
5	Thailand (THA); Piyaporn Panyawong; Wisutta Maensittirote; Prakaykaew Simanee; Khuntong Fongta	7:52.43
—	South Korea (KOR); Kim Mi-ra; Yang Choong-suk; Park Sun-young; Lim Sun-kyo	DSQ
