= Rowing at the 1998 Asian Games – Men's coxless four =

Men's coxless four at the 1998 Asian Games
- Venue: Map Prachan Reservoir
- Date: 16–19 December 1998
- Competitors: 32 from 8 nations

Medalists
gold medal	China; Zhang Binggui, Nie Junliang, Sun Jun, Dai Haizhen
silver medal	Japan; Shinpei Murai, Yukuo Okamoto, Tatsuya Mizutani, Tatsunori Nishioka
bronze medal	India; Birbal Singh, Tarlochan Singh, Johnson Xavier, Jagjit Singh

The men's coxless four competition at the 1998 Asian Games was held from 16 to 19 December 1998 at Map Prachan Reservoir, Chonburi province.

== Schedule ==
All times are Indochina Time (UTC+07:00)

Date	Time	Event
Wednesday, 16 December 1998	07:00	Heats
Thursday, 17 December 1998	07:00	Repechage
Saturday, 19 December 1998	07:00	Finals

== Results ==
Legend

- DNS — Did not start

=== Heats ===
- Qualification: 1 → Final A (FA), 2–4 → Repechage (R)

==== Heat 1 ====
Rank	Team	Time	Notes
1	China (CHN); Zhang Binggui; Nie Junliang; Sun Jun; Dai Haizhen	6:04.75	FA
2	Japan (JPN); Shinpei Murai; Yukuo Okamoto; Tatsuya Mizutani; Tatsunori Nishioka	6:09.03	R
3	South Korea (KOR); Shin Hyun-mun; Jung Jung-ho; Lee Jae-yoon; Baek In-ho	6:11.74	R
4	Philippines (PHI); Benjamin Tolentino; Rennan John Reyes; Nicanor Jasmin; Harvey Regalado	6:32.40	R

==== Heat 2 ====
Rank	Team	Time	Notes
1	Uzbekistan (UZB); Bahadir Davletyarov; Vladimir Grishenko; Timur Ganiev; Dmitriy Tikhonov	6:11.15	FA
2	India (IND); Birbal Singh; Tarlochan Singh; Johnson Xavier; Jagjit Singh	6:18.53	R
3	Kazakhstan (KAZ); Alexandr Ussachev; Mikhail Garnik; Georgiy Bartenev; Vladimir Belonogov	6:20.66	R
4	Thailand (THA); Yuttana Hoihem; Surachai Budsathien; Theerasak Pisamai; Patsabodi Khummee	6:54.51	R

=== Repechage ===
- Qualification: 1–4 → Final A (FA), 5–6 → Final B (FB)

Rank	Team	Time	Notes
1	Japan (JPN); Shinpei Murai; Yukuo Okamoto; Tatsuya Mizutani; Tatsunori Nishioka	6:12.66	FA
2	India (IND); Birbal Singh; Tarlochan Singh; Johnson Xavier; Jagjit Singh	6:17.54	FA
3	Kazakhstan (KAZ); Alexandr Ussachev; Mikhail Garnik; Georgiy Bartenev; Vladimir Belonogov	6:17.94	FA
4	South Korea (KOR); Shin Hyun-mun; Jung Jung-ho; Lee Jae-yoon; Baek In-ho	6:21.60	FA
5	Philippines (PHI); Benjamin Tolentino; Rennan John Reyes; Nicanor Jasmin; Harvey Regalado	6:24.20	FB
6	Thailand (THA); Yuttana Hoihem; Surachai Budsathien; Theerasak Pisamai; Patsabodi Khummee	7:27.51	FB

=== Finals ===
==== Final B ====
Rank	Team	Time
1	Philippines (PHI); Benjamin Tolentino; Rennan John Reyes; Nicanor Jasmin; Harvey Regalado	6:41.68
2	Thailand (THA); Yuttana Hoihem; Surachai Budsathien; Theerasak Pisamai; Patsabodi Khummee	7:08.27

==== Final A ====
Rank	Team	Time
1st place, gold medalist(s)	China (CHN); Zhang Binggui; Nie Junliang; Sun Jun; Dai Haizhen	6:15.97
2nd place, silver medalist(s)	Japan (JPN); Shinpei Murai; Yukuo Okamoto; Tatsuya Mizutani; Tatsunori Nishioka	6:21.15
3rd place, bronze medalist(s)	India (IND); Birbal Singh; Tarlochan Singh; Johnson Xavier; Jagjit Singh	6:25.28
4	South Korea (KOR); Shin Hyun-mun; Jung Jung-ho; Lee Jae-yoon; Baek In-ho	6:29.94
5	Uzbekistan (UZB); Bahadir Davletyarov; Vladimir Grishenko; Timur Ganiev; Dmitriy Tikhonov	6:30.28
6	Kazakhstan (KAZ); Alexandr Ussachev; Mikhail Garnik; Georgiy Bartenev; Vladimir Belonogov	6:34.57
