= Marcel Hacker =

German rower

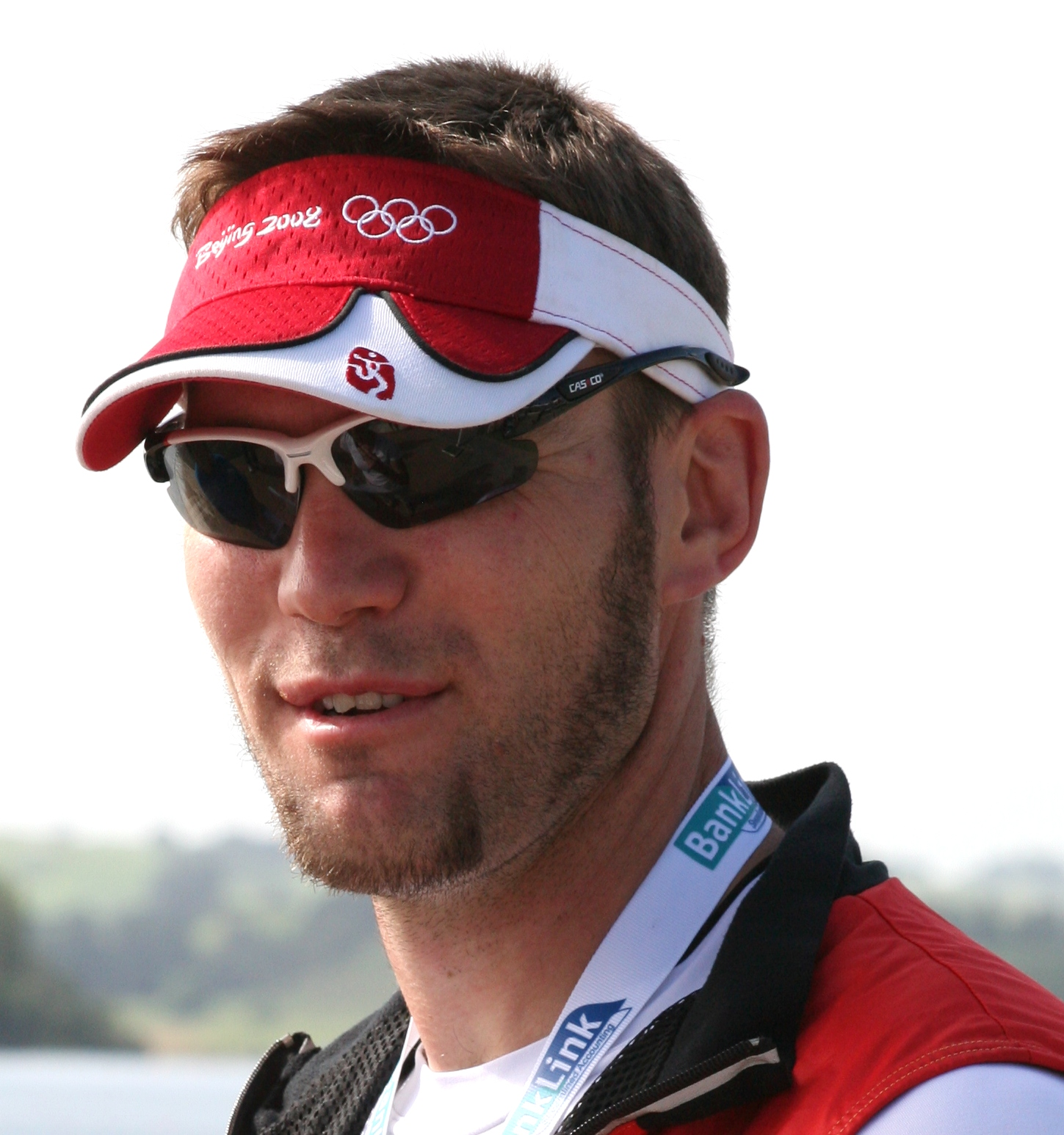

Medal record

Men's rowing

Representing Germany

Olympic Games
Bronze medal – third place	2000 Sydney	Single sculls

World Championships
Gold medal – first place	2002 Seville	Single sculls
Silver medal – second place	1997 Aiguebelette	Quadruple sculls
Silver medal – second place	1998 Cologne	Quadruple sculls
Silver medal – second place	2003 Milan	Single sculls
Silver medal – second place	2006 Eton	Single sculls
Bronze medal – third place	2009 Poznan	Quadruple sculls
Bronze medal – third place	2013 Chungju	Single sculls

European Championships
Silver medal – second place	2014 Belgrade	M1x

Marcel Hacker (born 29 April 1977, in Magdeburg) is a German rower.

== Career ==
Hacker won an Olympic bronze medal in 2000 in Sydney and became a world champion in 2002 in Seville.

In 2004, he won the Diamond Challenge Sculls for the second time (the premier event for single sculls) at the Henley Royal Regatta.

At the 2016 Summer Olympics in Rio de Janeiro, he competed in men's double sculls with teammate Stephan Krüger. They finished in 8th place.
