= Josef Källström =

Swedish rower

Personal information
- Nationality: Swedish
- Born: 25 February 1974 (age 51); Gothenburg, Sweden

Sport
- Sport: Rowing

Josef Källström (born 25 February 1974) is a Swedish rower. He competed in the men's lightweight double sculls event at the 2000 Summer Olympics.
