= Rowing at the 1998 Asian Games – Women's lightweight single sculls =

Women's lightweight single sculls at the 1998 Asian Games
- Venue: Map Prachan Reservoir
- Date: 18 December 1998
- Competitors: 6 from 6 nations

Medalists
gold medal	Ou Shaoyan	China
silver medal	Fenella Ng	Hong Kong
bronze medal	Phuttharaksa Neegree	Thailand

The women's lightweight single sculls competition at the 1998 Asian Games was held on 18 December 1998 at Map Prachan Reservoir, Chonburi province.

== Schedule ==
All times are Indochina Time (UTC+07:00)

Date	Time	Event
Friday, 18 December 1998	07:00	Final

== Results ==
Legend

- DNS — Did not start

Rank	Athlete	Time
1st place, gold medalist(s)	Ou Shaoyan (CHN)	7:47.34
2nd place, silver medalist(s)	Fenella Ng (HKG)	7:59.05
3rd place, bronze medalist(s)	Phuttharaksa Neegree (THA)	8:06.93
4	Kim Soon-duk (KOR)	8:30.59
5	Pauline Pugeda (PHI)	8:45.51
—	Aiko Asano (JPN)	DNS
