= Jesús Huerta =

Mexican rower (born 1980)

Personal information
- Born: 22 June 1980 (age 44); Mexico City, Mexico

Sport
- Sport: Rowing

Jesús Huerta (born 22 June 1980) is a Mexican rower. He competed in the men's single sculls event at the 2000 Summer Olympics.
