= Ingo Euler =

German rower

Medal record

Men's rowing

Representing Germany

World Rowing Championships
Bronze medal – third place	1997 Aiguebelette	LM2x
Bronze medal – third place	1999 St. Catharines	LM2x

Ingo Euler (born 27 November 1971, in Freiburg im Breisgau) is a German rower. Together with his double sculls partner Bernhard Rühling, Ingo Euler dominated German lightweight sculling in the late 1990s and early 2000s and competed in the 1996 (with Peter Uhrig), 2000 (with Bernhard Rühling) and 2004 (with Manuel Brehmer) Olympic Games in the Lightweight Double Sculls. His best Olympic result was 4th place at the Sydney Olympic Games in 2000.
