= Ján Žiška (rower) =

Slovak rower

Personal information
- Nationality: Slovak
- Born: 29 January 1971 (age 54); Bratislava, Slovakia

Sport
- Sport: Rowing

Ján Žiška (born 29 January 1971) is a Slovak rower. He competed at the 1996 Summer Olympics and the 2000 Summer Olympics. He is a member of the Slovak Rowing Club in Bratislava.
