= Rowing at the 1998 Asian Games – Women's lightweight double sculls =

Women's lightweight double sculls at the 1998 Asian Games
- Venue: Map Prachan Reservoir
- Date: 16–19 December 1998
- Competitors: 14 from 7 nations

Medalists
gold medal	Fan Ruihua; Ou Shaoyan	China
silver medal	Akiko Iwamoto; Yoshie Sugiyama	Japan
bronze medal	Ri Son-yong; Mun Won-ok	North Korea

The women's lightweight double sculls competition at the 1998 Asian Games was held from 16 to 19 December 1998 at Map Prachan Reservoir, Chonburi province.

== Schedule ==
All times are Indochina Time (UTC+07:00)

Date	Time	Event
Wednesday, 16 December 1998	07:00	Heats
Thursday, 17 December 1998	07:00	Repechage
Saturday, 19 December 1998	07:00	Final

== Results ==
=== Heats ===
- Qualification: 1 → Final A (FA), 2–4 → Repechage (R)

==== Heat 1 ====
Rank	Team	Time	Notes
1	China (CHN); Fan Ruihua; Ou Shaoyan	7:07.14	FA
2	North Korea (PRK); Ri Son-yong; Mun Won-ok	7:35.06	R
3	Philippines (PHI); Myla Babilonia; Concepcion Fornea	7:41.38	R
4	Chinese Taipei (TPE); Chen Tzu-i; Chuang Yen-chun	7:46.94	R

==== Heat 2 ====
Rank	Team	Time	Notes
1	Japan (JPN); Akiko Iwamoto; Yoshie Sugiyama	7:25.62	FA
2	Hong Kong (HKG); Chan Hok Yan; Lai Wing Sze	7:56.08	R
3	Thailand (THA); Tanatcha Tansiadee; Namthip Wanyen	8:08.76	R

=== Repechage ===
- Qualification: 1–4 → Final A (FA)

Rank	Team	Time	Notes
1	North Korea (PRK); Ri Son-yong; Mun Won-ok	7:35.47	FA
2	Chinese Taipei (TPE); Chen Tzu-i; Chuang Yen-chun	7:48.35	FA
3	Philippines (PHI); Myla Babilonia; Concepcion Fornea	7:50.39	FA
4	Hong Kong (HKG); Chan Hok Yan; Lai Wing Sze	7:51.04	FA
5	Thailand (THA); Tanatcha Tansiadee; Namthip Wanyen	8:10.09	

=== Final ===
Rank	Team	Time
1st place, gold medalist(s)	China (CHN); Fan Ruihua; Ou Shaoyan	7:26.08
2nd place, silver medalist(s)	Japan (JPN); Akiko Iwamoto; Yoshie Sugiyama	7:34.99
3rd place, bronze medalist(s)	North Korea (PRK); Ri Son-yong; Mun Won-ok	7:43.60
4	Hong Kong (HKG); Chan Hok Yan; Lai Wing Sze	8:01.68
5	Philippines (PHI); Myla Babilonia; Concepcion Fornea	8:04.82
6	Chinese Taipei (TPE); Chen Tzu-i; Chuang Yen-chun	8:14.42
