= Rowing at the 2002 Asian Games – Men's double sculls =

Men's double sculls at the 2002 Asian Games
- Venue: Nakdong River
- Date: 30 September – 3 October 2002
- Competitors: 14 from 7 nations

Medalists
gold medal	Wang Jingfeng; Su Hui	China
silver medal	Yevgeniy Latypov; Mikhail Garnik	Kazakhstan
bronze medal	Kim Jung-kwan; Kim Dal-ho	South Korea

The men's double sculls competition at the 2002 Asian Games in Busan was held from 30 September to 3 October at the Nakdong River.

== Schedule ==
All times are Korea Standard Time (UTC+09:00)

Date	Time	Event
Monday, 30 September 2002	12:30	Heats
Tuesday, 1 October 2002	12:30	Repechage
Thursday, 3 October 2002	11:15	Final

== Results ==
=== Heats ===
- Qualification: 1 → Final (FA), 2–4 → Repechage (R)

==== Heat 1 ====
Rank	Team	Time	Notes
1	Kazakhstan (KAZ); Yevgeniy Latypov; Mikhail Garnik	6:42.43	FA
2	Japan (JPN); Keisuke Murai; Masayuki Yoshizaki	6:47.65	R
3	Pakistan (PAK); Muhammad Afzal; Zeeshan Majeed	6:52.37	R

==== Heat 2 ====
Rank	Team	Time	Notes
1	China (CHN); Wang Jingfeng; Su Hui	6:34.54	FA
2	South Korea (KOR); Kim Jung-kwan; Kim Dal-ho	6:46.53	R
3	North Korea (PRK); Maeng Chol-ho; Kim Kwang-ho	7:01.42	R
4	Kuwait (KUW); Raed Al-Failakawi; Hamad Al-Wahaib	7:44.20	R

=== Repechage ===
- Qualification: 1–4 → Final (FA)

Rank	Team	Time	Notes
1	North Korea (PRK); Maeng Chol-ho; Kim Kwang-ho	6:54.54	FA
2	Japan (JPN); Keisuke Murai; Masayuki Yoshizaki	6:56.51	FA
3	South Korea (KOR); Kim Jung-kwan; Kim Dal-ho	7:01.46	FA
4	Pakistan (PAK); Muhammad Afzal; Zeeshan Majeed	7:16.62	FA
5	Kuwait (KUW); Raed Al-Failakawi; Hamad Al-Wahaib	7:48.49	

=== Final ===
Rank	Team	Time
1st place, gold medalist(s)	China (CHN); Wang Jingfeng; Su Hui	7:33.07
2nd place, silver medalist(s)	Kazakhstan (KAZ); Yevgeniy Latypov; Mikhail Garnik	7:44.76
3rd place, bronze medalist(s)	South Korea (KOR); Kim Jung-kwan; Kim Dal-ho	7:50.59
4	Japan (JPN); Keisuke Murai; Masayuki Yoshizaki	7:56.46
5	North Korea (PRK); Maeng Chol-ho; Kim Kwang-ho	8:01.40
6	Pakistan (PAK); Muhammad Afzal; Zeeshan Majeed	8:27.94
