= Rowing at the 1998 Asian Games – Men's single sculls =

Men's single sculls at the 1998 Asian Games
- Venue: Map Prachan Reservoir
- Date: 18 December 1998
- Competitors: 6 from 6 nations

Medalists
gold medal	Cai Yukun	China
silver medal	Lasmin	Indonesia
bronze medal	Muhammad Akram	Pakistan

The men's single sculls competition at the 1998 Asian Games was held on 18 December 1998 at Map Prachan Reservoir, Chonburi province.

== Schedule ==
All times are Indochina Time (UTC+07:00)

Date	Time	Event
Friday, 18 December 1998	07:00	Final

== Results ==
Rank	Athlete	Time
1st place, gold medalist(s)	Cai Yukun (CHN)	7:01.92
2nd place, silver medalist(s)	Lasmin (INA)	7:06.86
3rd place, bronze medalist(s)	Muhammad Akram (PAK)	7:10.63
4	Yevgeniy Latypov (KAZ)	7:24.58
5	Michael Tse (HKG)	7:25.03
6	Chuchart Tayasut (THA)	8:06.06
