= Keisuke Murai =

Japanese rower (born 1973)

Personal information
- Nationality: Japanese
- Born: 14 August 1973 (age 52) Osaka Prefecture, Japan

Sport
- Sport: Rowing

Keisuke Murai (村井 啓介, Murai Keisuke; born 14 August 1973) is a Japanese rower. He competed in the men's lightweight coxless four event at the 2000 Summer Olympics.
