= Pascal Touron =

French rower (born 1973)

Medal record

Men's rowing

Representing France

Olympic Games
Silver medal – second place	2004 Athens	Lightweight Double sculls
Bronze medal – third place	2000 Sydney	Lightweight double sculls

World Rowing Championships
Gold medal – first place	2001 Lucerne	LM8+
Bronze medal – third place	1996 Strathclyde	LM4x

Pascal Touron (born 22 May 1973 in Arcachon) is a French rower. He won one of his first international races in 1989 in the GB vs France Under 16 Match. He has won two Olympic medals: a bronze medal in the Men's Lightweight Double Sculls in 2000 and a silver in the same event in 2004.
