= Mattia Righetti =

Italian rower

Medal record

Men's rowing

Representing Italy

World Rowing Championships
Bronze medal – third place	2001 Lucerne	M4x
Bronze medal – third place	2002 Seville	M4x

Mattia Righetti (born 10 March 1980 in La Spezia) is an Italian rower.
