= Rubén Álvarez (rower) =

Spanish rower

Personal information
- Nationality: Spanish
- Born: 10 May 1976 (age 48); Oviedo, Spain

Sport
- Sport: Rowing

Rubén Álvarez Hoyos (born 10 May 1976) is a Spanish rower. He competed at the 2000 Summer Olympics and the 2004 Summer Olympics.
