= Conal Groom =

American rower and rowing coach

Personal information
- Born: May 16, 1973 (age 53) New Haven, Connecticut, United States

Sport
- Sport: Rowing
Medal record
Representing United States
Pan American Games
Bronze medal – third place	2003 Santo Domingo	Double sculls

Conal P. Groom (born May 16, 1973) is an American competition competitive rower and coach. He co-founded Seattle Rowing Center with Carol Nagy, the former junior novice coach at Lake Union Crew and business manager at Pocock Rowing Center. In 2019, Groom moved to mountains outside Santa Barbara, California.

== Career ==
Groom graduated from (and rowed at) a boarding school in Massachusetts, the Berkshire School. He then studied at Georgetown University, where he rowed on the varsity crew team and served as captain of the lightweight crew team in the mid-1990s.

He was, in September 2010, the head coach at Seattle Rowing Center, a rowing club devoted to youth through elite development on Lake Washington's Ship Canal in Seattle, Washington. He was hired as head coach at Lake Union Crew, another Seattle rowing club, until he left in July 2010. Before his employment at Lake Union Crew, he was director and an elite coach at Pocock Rowing Center.

== Olympic rowing ==
Groom has placed as high as third in world championship competition (lightweight quadruple sculls, 1998), and he and Steve Tucker placed sixth in the 1999 World Championships. Groom and Tucker competed at the 2000 Summer Olympics, finishing 11th in the lightweight double sculls.

== Controversies ==
As of March 14, 2022, Groom is under investigation by USRowing for allegations of sexual misconduct and is prohibited from coaching or interacting with minors. He has been accused on multiple occasions of abusing young rowers under his tutelage. Of lesser importance, the same article details how Groom employed training methods that, ultimately, were detrimental to their rowing goals.

Effective November 2, 2023, Groom was suspended from any participation in the sport for 7 years followed by a 3-year probation and issued a No Contact Order by USRowing.
