= Taher Kaboutari =

Iranian rower (born 1985)

Personal information
- Born: 16 August 1985 (age 40) Mohabad, Iran
- Height: 190 cm (75 in)
- Weight: 70 kg (150 lb)

Sport
- Country: Iran
- Sport: Rowing

Taher Kaboutari (born 1985) is an athlete who competes for the Islamic Republic of Iran in rowing. Taher Kaboutari competed in the 2010 Asian Games representing Iran.

== Competitive appearances ==
- 16th Annual Asian Games, Guangzhou 2010
