= Vladimir Belonogov =

Kazakhstani rower (born 1977)

Personal information
- Native name: Владимир Белоногов
- Full name: Vladimir Belonogov
- Nationality: Kazakhstani
- Born: 6 July 1977 (age 48) Temirtau, Kazakhstan

Sport
- Sport: Rowing

Vladimir Belonogov (Kazakh: Владимир Александрович Белоногов; born 6 July 1977) is a Kazakhstani rower. As a junior, he would compete at the 1995 World Rowing Junior Championships and place ninth in the men's single sculls event. Five years later, he would compete at the 2000 Summer Olympics representing Kazakhstan in rowing.

Belonogov would compete in the men's single sculls event. He would place last in the quarterfinals and would be relegated to a repechage round. Then, he would again place last, advancing to the semifinals in group C/D. He would place third in the semifinal and would advance to Final C. After the finals were held, he would be ranked 16th out of the 24 competitors that had competed in the event.

== Biography ==
Vladimir Belonogov was born on 6 July 1977 in Temirtau, Kazakhstan. As a junior athlete, Belonogov would compete at the 1995 edition of the World Rowing Junior Championships, which was held in Poznań, Poland. There, he would compete in the junior men's single sculls event and place eighth overall with a time of 7:44.09.

He would compete at the 2000 Summer Olympics held in Sydney, Australia, representing Kazakhstan in rowing. At the games, he would compete in the men's single sculls event from 17 to 23 September. In the quarterfinals of the event, he would compete against five other competitors. He would place last in the round with a time of 7:34.66 and would be relegated to a repechage round. He would then compete against four other competitors in the repechage, once again placing last, finishing with a time of 7:36.42 and was moved to the semifinals in group C/D. In the semifinal, he would compete against five other competitors and placed third with a time of 7:24.44. This would let him qualify for Final C. In the finals, he would finish with a time of 7:21.44 and be ranked 16th out of the 24 competitors that had competed in the event.
