= Rowing at the 2002 Asian Games – Women's single sculls =

Women's single sculls at the 2002 Asian Games
- Venue: Nakdong River
- Date: 30 September – 2 October 2002
- Competitors: 7 from 7 nations

Medalists
gold medal	Zhang Xiuyun	China
silver medal	Naoe Harada	Japan
bronze medal	Lee Eun-hwa	South Korea

The women's single sculls competition at the 2002 Asian Games in Busan was held from 30 September to 2 October at the Nakdong River.

This rowing event is a single scull event, meaning that each boat is propelled by a single rower. The "scull" portion means that the rower uses two oars, one on each side of the boat; this contrasts with sweep rowing in which each rower has one oar and rows on only one side (not feasible for singles events).

== Schedule ==
All times are Korea Standard Time (UTC+09:00)

Date	Time	Event
Monday, 30 September 2002	10:30	Heats
Tuesday, 1 October 2002	12:00	Repechage
Wednesday, 2 October 2002	12:30	Final

== Results ==
Legend

- DNS — Did not start

=== Heats ===
- Qualification: 1 → Final (FA), 2–4 → Repechage (R)

==== Heat 1 ====
Rank	Athlete	Time	Notes
1	Zhang Xiuyun (CHN)	8:09.32	FA
2	Pere Karoba (INA)	8:19.42	R
3	Elsie Lim (SIN)	8:35.47	R
4	Yung Ka Yan (HKG)	8:48.72	R

==== Heat 2 ====
Rank	Athlete	Time	Notes
1	Lee Eun-hwa (KOR)	8:05.70	FA
2	Naoe Harada (JPN)	8:11.84	R
3	Manjula Rai (IND)	8:41.60	R

=== Repechage ===
- Qualification: 1–4 → Final (FA)

Rank	Athlete	Time	Notes
1	Naoe Harada (JPN)	8:15.14	FA
2	Pere Karoba (INA)	8:17.08	FA
3	Yung Ka Yan (HKG)	8:22.54	FA
4	Elsie Lim (SIN)	8:25.70	FA
5	Manjula Rai (IND)	8:33.80	

=== Final ===
Rank	Athlete	Time
1st place, gold medalist(s)	Zhang Xiuyun (CHN)	9:15.28
2nd place, silver medalist(s)	Naoe Harada (JPN)	9:38.30
3rd place, bronze medalist(s)	Lee Eun-hwa (KOR)	9:52.34
4	Pere Karoba (INA)	9:55.79
5	Elsie Lim (SIN)	10:29.79
—	Yung Ka Yan (HKG)	DNS
