= Andris Reinholds =

Latvian rower (born 1971)

Personal information
- Nationality: Latvian
- Born: 7 June 1971 (age 54) Riga, Latvia

Sport
- Sport: Rowing

Andris Reinholds (born 7 June 1971) is a Latvian rower. He competed at the 1996 Summer Olympics and the 2000 Summer Olympics.
