= Rowing at the 1998 Asian Games – Women's lightweight quadruple sculls =

Women's lightweight quadruple sculls at the 1998 Asian Games
- Venue: Map Prachan Reservoir
- Date: 18 December 1998
- Competitors: 20 from 5 nations

Medalists
gold medal	China; Fan Ruihua, Shen Senping, Peng Ying, Liu Bili
silver medal	Japan; Aiko Asano, Yoshie Sugiyama, Junko Kano, Akiko Iwamoto
bronze medal	North Korea; Kim Mi-sun, Rim Kum-suk, Mun Won-ok, Ri Son-yong

The women's lightweight quadruple sculls competition at the 1998 Asian Games was held on 18 December 1998 at Map Prachan Reservoir, Chonburi province.

== Schedule ==
All times are Indochina Time (UTC+07:00)

Date	Time	Event
Friday, 18 December 1998	07:00	Final

== Results ==
Rank	Team	Time
1st place, gold medalist(s)	China (CHN); Fan Ruihua; Shen Senping; Peng Ying; Liu Bili	6:39.74
2nd place, silver medalist(s)	Japan (JPN); Aiko Asano; Yoshie Sugiyama; Junko Kano; Akiko Iwamoto	6:44.74
3rd place, bronze medalist(s)	North Korea (PRK); Kim Mi-sun; Rim Kum-suk; Mun Won-ok; Ri Son-yong	6:57.70
4	Thailand (THA); Phimpaka Thednum; Wisutta Maensittirote; Bussayamas Phaengkathok; Suparat Koset	7:07.70
5	Chinese Taipei (TPE); Chen Tzu-i; Lai Hung-wen; Chuang Yen-chun; Chen Yi-yin	7:09.03
