= Michael Tse (rower) =

Hong Kong rower (born 1964)

Personal information
- Native name
- Traditional Chinese: 謝家德
- Simplified Chinese: 谢家德
Transcriptions
Standard Mandarin
- Hanyu Pinyin: Xiè Jiādé
- Wade–Giles: Hsieh Chia Te
Yue: Cantonese
- Jyutping: Ce6 Gaa1 Dak1
- Full name: Michael Andrew Tse
- Nationality: Hong Konger
- Born: 13 January 1964 (age 61)

Sport
- Sport: Rowing

Michael Andrew Tse (traditional Chinese: 謝家德; simplified Chinese: 谢家德; born 13 January 1964) is a Hong Kong rower. He competed in the men's single sculls event at the 1996 Summer Olympics. In both the 1995 and 1996 Asian Canoeing Championships, he received a silver medal. Tse became a fitness coach at the Hong Kong Sports Institute in 1991 and had become its head coach by 1999. He was the deputy director of the Institute of Human Performance at the University of Hong Kong in 2008.

== Biography ==
Michael Andrew Tse was born in the United States on 13 January 1964 and is of Chinese and German descent. He moved to Hong Kong in 1990 and became a fitness coach at the Hong Kong Sports Institute in Sha Tin in 1991. By 1999, he had become its head coach. He was responsible for overseeing the institute's budget and training Hong Kong's top athletes. Athletes including the windsurfer Lee Lai Shan and the cyclist Wong Kam-po sought his advice at the institute.

When he was 29 years old in 1993, he started training in rowing. Tse said, "I wanted to prove to the Hong Kong sports community that even someone without great natural talent, who works while training, can reach an Asian level. In fact, other athletes can do the same." During the 1994 Asian Games, Tse placed fifth in the men's single sculls. He represented Hong Kong at the 1995 and 1996 Asian Canoeing Championships. In both competitions, he received a silver medal. During a rowing qualifier for the 1996 Summer Olympics, he placed second. He was the only athlete on the Hong Kong rowing team to qualify for that year's Olympics. During the 1998 Asian Games, Tse placed fifth in the men's single sculls. At the inaugural Asian Indoor Rowing Championships (Chinese: 亞洲室內划艇錦標賽) held in 2000, Tse placed second in the men's open individual 2000m.

Tse received a bachelor's degree in exercise science from the University of New Hampshire and a Master of Business Administration from the University of Leicester. In 2004, he was a doctoral student in exercise science at the University of Hong Kong. He was the deputy director of the Institute of Human Performance at the University of Hong Kong in 2008.
