= Bernhard Rühling =

German rower

Medal record

Men's rowing

Representing Germany

World Rowing Championships
Silver medal – second place	1995 Tampere	LM4x
Bronze medal – third place	1992 Montreal	LM4x
Silver medal – second place	1993 Račice	LM4x
Bronze medal – third place	1997 Aiguebelette	LM2x
Bronze medal – third place	1999 St. Catharines	LM2x

Bernhard Rühling (born 14 February 1969) is a retired German lightweight rower and Olympic competitor.

Rühling was born in 1969 in Stuttgart. He has won medals at a number of World Rowing Championships in lightweight quad scull (LM4x) and double sculls (LM2x). He competed in the lightweight double sculls at the 2000 Summer Olympics in Sydney, Australia where the team came fourth.
