= Fenella Ng =

Hong Kong swimmer and rower

Personal information
- Born: 25 July 1968 (age 57)

Sport
- Sport: Swimming
Medal record
Representing Hong Kong
Asian Games
Bronze medal – third place	1986 Seoul	4x100m freestyle relay

Fenella Ng Gar-loc (吳家樂; born 25 July 1968) is a Hong Kong swimmer and rower. She competed as a swimmer at the 1984 Summer Olympics and the 1988 Summer Olympics and as a rower at the 2000 Summer Olympics.

Ng is of Chinese and British descent. She took up swimming at an early age. She trained at the Mantas Swimming Club along with Hung Cee Kay. In swimming at the 1986 Asian Games, she won bronze in the women's 4 × 100 m freestyle relay with Hung, Fu Mui, and Lee Sau-mei. She studied chemical engineering at the University of Leeds. Following her return to Hong Kong in 1993, for her final appearance as a swimmer at the Asian Games in 1994, she won silver in the women's 4 × 100 m freestyle relay. After a break from sport, in 1995 she took up rowing. She represented Hong Kong in that sport at the 1998 Asian Games, and in 2000 became the first Hong Kong athlete to compete in two different sports at the Olympics. The following year, she retired from competition. She co-founded the Tritons Triathlon Club in 2008 with fellow Olympians Annemarie Munk and Michael Tse. Fenella also served as President of the Hong Kong Triathlon Association which grew to 2,500 members.
