= Rowing at the 2002 Asian Games – Women's lightweight single sculls =

Women's lightweight single sculls at the 2002 Asian Games
- Venue: Nakdong River
- Date: 30 September – 2 October 2002
- Competitors: 8 from 8 nations

Medalists
gold medal	Fu Fengjun	China
silver medal	Phuttharaksa Neegree	Thailand
bronze medal	Yung Ka Yan	Hong Kong

The women's lightweight single sculls competition at the 2002 Asian Games in Busan was held from 30 September to 2 October 2002 at the Nakdong River.

== Schedule ==
All times are Korea Standard Time (UTC+09:00)

Date	Time	Event
Monday, 30 September 2002	11:30	Heats
Tuesday, 1 October 2002	10:40	Repechage
Wednesday, 2 October 2002	10:30	Finals

== Results ==
=== Heats ===
- Qualification: 1 → Final A (FA), 2–4 → Repechage (R)

==== Heat 1 ====
Rank	Athlete	Time	Notes
1	Penelope Foo (SIN)	8:10.92	FA
2	Mako Ozawa (JPN)	8:16.77	R
3	Gurpreet Kaur (IND)	8:37.10	R
4	Mithila Gunawardena (SRI)	9:56.10	R

==== Heat 2 ====
Rank	Athlete	Time	Notes
1	Fu Fengjun (CHN)	7:59.02	FA
2	Phuttharaksa Neegree (THA)	8:10.29	R
3	Kim Young-tae (KOR)	8:11.10	R
4	Yung Ka Yan (HKG)	8:29.42	R

=== Repechage ===
- Qualification: 1–4 → Final A (FA), 5–6 → Final B (FB)

Rank	Athlete	Time	Notes
1	Yung Ka Yan (HKG)	8:12.78	FA
2	Mako Ozawa (JPN)	8:14.80	FA
3	Kim Young-tae (KOR)	8:18.08	FA
4	Phuttharaksa Neegree (THA)	8:30.89	FA
5	Gurpreet Kaur (IND)	8:40.18	FB
6	Mithila Gunawardena (SRI)	10:06.32	FB

=== Finals ===
==== Final B ====
Rank	Athlete	Time
1	Gurpreet Kaur (IND)	9:43.18
2	Mithila Gunawardena (SRI)	11:00.48

==== Final A ====
Rank	Athlete	Time
1st place, gold medalist(s)	Fu Fengjun (CHN)	9:00.81
2nd place, silver medalist(s)	Phuttharaksa Neegree (THA)	9:19.29
3rd place, bronze medalist(s)	Yung Ka Yan (HKG)	9:28.29
4	Penelope Foo (SIN)	9:34.26
5	Mako Ozawa (JPN)	9:40.94
6	Kim Young-tae (KOR)	9:48.81
