= Juan Zunzunegui =

Spanish rower

Personal information
- Nationality: Spanish
- Born: 31 March 1976 (age 48); Vigo, Spain

Sport
- Sport: Rowing

Juan Zunzunegui (born 31 March 1976) is a Spanish rower. He competed at the 2000 Summer Olympics and the 2004 Summer Olympics.
