= Liu Lijuan (rower) =

Chinese rower

Personal information
- Nationality: Chinese
- Born: 8 July 1978 (age 46)

Sport
- Sport: Rowing

Liu Lijuan (born 8 July 1978) is a Chinese rower. She competed in the women's quadruple sculls event at the 2000 Summer Olympics.
