= Sun Guangxia =

Chinese rower

Personal information
- Nationality: Chinese
- Born: 25 August 1976 (age 48)

Sport
- Sport: Rowing

Sun Guangxia (born 25 August 1976) is a Chinese rower. She competed in two events at the 2000 Summer Olympics.
