= Lee In-soo =

South Korean rower

Personal information
- Nationality: South Korean
- Born: 1 October 1973 (age 51)

Sport
- Sport: Rowing

Lee In-soo (born 1 October 1973) is a South Korean rower. He competed at the 1996 Summer Olympics and the 2000 Summer Olympics.
