= Ou Shaoyan =

Chinese rower (born 1973)

Personal information
- Born: 17 August 1973 (age 53) Xinxing County, Guangdong Province, China
- Height: 167 cm (5 ft 6 in)
- Weight: 60 kg (132 lb)

Sport
- Sport: Rowing
Medal record
Women's rowing
Representing China
World Rowing Championships
Gold medal – first place	1991 Vienna	Lwt coxless four
Silver medal – second place	1994 Indianapolis	Lwt double sculls
Summer Universiade
Gold medal – first place	1993 Buffalo	Lwt coxless pair
Asian Games
Gold medal – first place	1994 Hiroshima	Lwt double sculls
Gold medal – first place	1994 Hiroshima	Lwt coxless four
Gold medal – first place	1998 Bangkok	Lwt single sculls
Gold medal – first place	1998 Bangkok	Lwt double sculls

Ou Shaoyan (born 17 August 1973) is a Chinese lightweight rower.

Ou was born in 1973 and is from Guangdong, China. She competed in lightweight women's four and won gold at the 1991 World Rowing Championships, and came fourth at the 1992 World Rowing Championships. She changed to the lightweight women's double sculls and won silver at the 1994 World Rowing Championships, came ninth at the 1995 World Rowing Championships, and came ninth at the 1996 Summer Olympics partnered with Li Fei.

Ou then changed to the lightweight women's quad sculls and came fourth at the 1998 World Rowing Championships. At the 2000 Summer Olympics in Sydney, Australia, she partnered with Yu Hua in the lightweight women's double sculls and came tenth. At the 2004 World Rowing Championships, she competed as the cox for the LTA mixed coxed four in one of the adaptive rowing events, and their team came eighth.
