= Jagjit Singh (rower) =

Indian rower

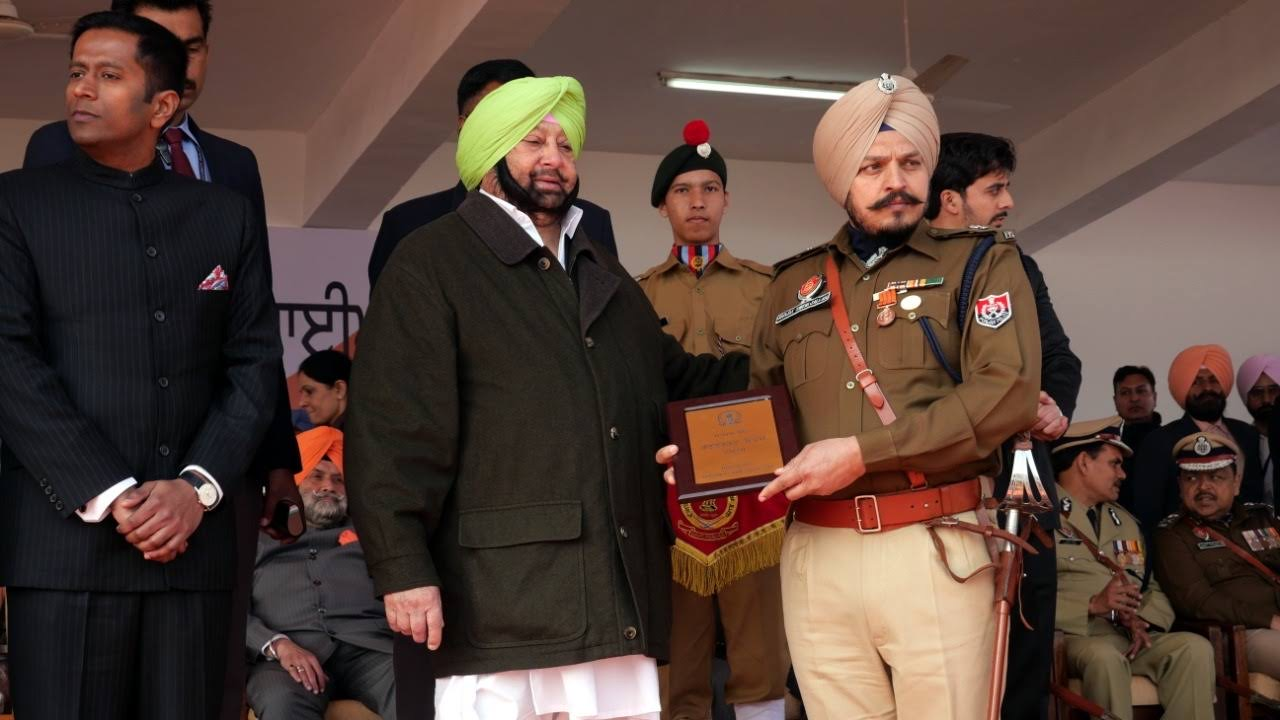
- Jagjit Singh Jallah (right)

Personal information
- Full name: Jagjit Singh Jallah
- Nationality: Indian
- Born: 2 October 1966 (age 59) Jallah, Punjab, India

Sport
- Country: India
- Sport: Rowing
- Event(s): M4+, M2-
- Club: Bombay Sappers

Jagjit Singh Jallah is an international rowing competitor from the state of Punjab, India. Singh was born in the village of Jallah, Ludhiana, Punjab. He is the first Punjabi to receive an Arjuna award in rowing. He works for the Punjab police.

== Awards ==
S.No.	Awards	Year
1	Arjuna Award	1999
2	Life-time achievement award	2007

== Achievements ==
Year	International events	Venue	Result	Distance
1993	International Regatta	Switzerland	5th	2000 m
1994	Asian Games	Hiroshima, Japan	3rd	2000 m
1994	International Regatta	Ukraine	2nd	2000 m
1994	International Regatta	Ukraine	3rd	2000 m
1999	1999 Asian Championship	Japan	2nd	2000 m
1999	1999 Asian Championship	Japan	3rd	2000 m

S. No	Game Year	City	Achievements	Result
1.	17th National Rowing Championship	Hyderabad	Coxed Four	SILVER
2.	19th National Rowing Championship	Bangalore	Coxed Four	GOLD
3.	32nd National Games	Hyderabad	Coxless Four	2 SILVER
4.	32nd National Games	Hyderabad	Coxless Pair	SILVER
5.	3rd All India Police Rowing Championship	Srinagar, J&K	Coxess Four	GOLD
6.	14th National Rowing Championship	Madras	Coxed Four	GOLD

Asian Games Bombay Sappers Maharaja Ratan Singh Awardee Arjuna Awardee Other
