= Liu Bili =

Chinese rower

Liu Bili is a Chinese lightweight rower.

At the 1996 World Rowing Championships, she won gold in the lightweight four. At the 1998 World Rowing Championships, she came fourth in the lightweight quad sculls.
