= Hiroya Sato =

Japanese rower (born 1976)

Personal information
- Nationality: Japanese
- Born: 25 August 1976 (age 49) Miyagi, Japan

Sport
- Sport: Rowing

Hiroya Sato (佐藤 寛弥, Satō Hiroya; born 25 August 1976) is a Japanese rower. He competed in the men's lightweight coxless four event at the 2000 Summer Olympics.
