= Rowing at the 2000 Summer Olympics – Men's single sculls =

Olympic rowing event

Men's single sculls at the Games of the XXVII Olympiad
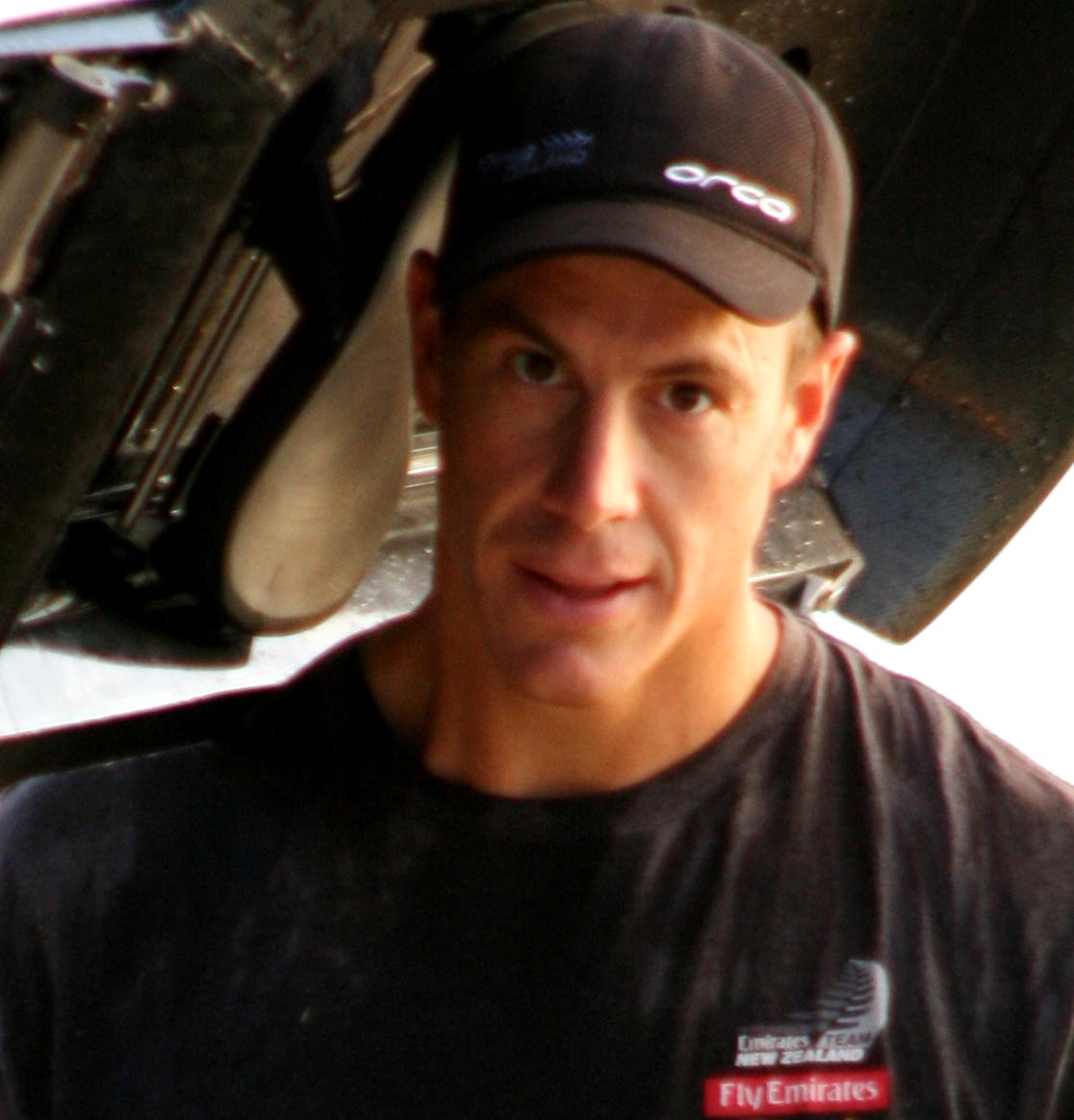
- Gold medallist Rob Waddell (2008)
- Venue: Sydney International Regatta Centre
- Dates: 17–23 September 2000
- Competitors: 24 from 24 nations
- Winning time: 6:48.90

Medalists
1st place, gold medalist(s)		Rob Waddell; New Zealand
2nd place, silver medalist(s)		Xeno Müller; Switzerland
3rd place, bronze medalist(s)		Marcel Hacker; Germany

The men's single sculls competition at the 2000 Summer Olympics in Sydney, Australia took place at the Sydney International Regatta Centre. It was held from 17 to 23 September. There were 24 competitors from 24 nations, with each nation limited to a single boat in the event. The event was won by Rob Waddell of New Zealand, the nation's first victory in the event after bronze medals in 1920 and 1988. Defending champion Xeno Müller of Switzerland placed second, becoming the 11th man to win multiple medals in the event. Marcel Hacker of Germany took bronze; it was the 11th consecutive Games with a German rower on the podium in the event (including the United Team of Germany, East Germany, West Germany, and Germany).

== Background ==
This was the 23rd appearance of the event. Rowing had been on the programme in 1896 but was cancelled due to bad weather. The single sculls has been held every time that rowing has been contested, beginning in 1900.

Seven of the 21 single scullers from the 1996 Games returned: gold medallist Xeno Müller of Switzerland, silver medallist Derek Porter of Canada, fifth-place finisher (and 1992 silver medallist) Václav Chalupa of the Czech Republic, seventh-place finisher Rob Waddell of New Zealand, eighth-place finisher Ali Ibrahim of Egypt, twelfth-place finisher Sergio Fernández González of Argentina, and eighteenth-place finisher (and 1992 fifth-place finisher) Jüri Jaanson of Estonia. Müller and Waddell were the top two scullers coming into the Games; Waddell had won the last two World Championships in 1998 and 1999 with Müller the runner-up both times. Porter was another contender, with a third-place finish at the latest World Championship (he had also won that event seven years earlier). Chalupa was also a perennial contender, with four silver and two bronze medals at the World Championships in the single sculls to go along with his 1992 Olympic silver (he would add a third bronze in 2001). Other challengers included veterans Jaanson and Fernández.

Algeria, Kazakhstan, Pakistan, Slovakia, and Tunisia each made their debut in the event. The United States made its 19th appearance, most among nations.

== Competition format ==
This rowing event is a single scull event, meaning that each boat is propelled by a single rower. The "scull" portion means that the rower uses two oars, one on each side of the boat; this contrasts with sweep rowing in which each rower has one oar and rows on only one side (not feasible for singles events). The competition consists of multiple rounds. Finals were held to determine the placing of each boat; these finals were given letters with those nearer to the beginning of the alphabet meaning a better ranking. Semifinals were named based on which finals they fed, with each semifinal having two possible finals. The course used the 2000 metres distance that became the Olympic standard in 1912.

During the first round four quarterfinal heats, each with 6 boats, were held. The winning boat in each heat advanced to the semifinals, while all others were relegated to the repechages.

The repechages offered the rowers a chance to qualify for the semi-final. Placing in the repechages determined which semifinal the boat would race in. Four heats were held, with 5 boats each. The top two boats in each repechage moved on to the A/B semifinals, with the bottom three boats going to the C/D semifinals.

Four semifinals were held, two each of A/B semifinals and C/D semifinals. For each semifinal race, the top three boats moved on to the better of the two finals, while the bottom three boats went to the lesser of the two finals possible. For example, a second-place finish in an A/B semifinal would result in advancement to the A final.

The fourth and final round was the finals. Each final determined a set of rankings. The A final determined the medals, along with the rest of the places through 6th. The B final gave rankings from 7th to 12th, the C from 13th to 18th, and so on. Thus, to win a medal rowers had to finish in either the top one of their quarterfinal or top two of their repechage heat and top three of their A/B semifinal to reach the A final.

== Schedule ==
All times are Australian Time (UTC+10)

Date	Time	Round
Saturday, 17 September 2000	9:10	Quarterfinals
Tuesday, 19 September 2000	9:10	Repechage
Thursday, 21 September 2000	8:50; 10:30	Semifinals A/B; Semifinals C/D
Friday, 22 September 2000	10:20; 11:30; 11:50	Final B Final C Final D
Saturday, 23 September 2000	8:50	Final A

== Results ==
=== Quarterfinals ===
The winner of each heat advanced to the A/B semifinals, remainder went to the repechage.

==== Quarterfinal 1 ====
Rank	Rower	Nation	Time	Notes
1	Derek Porter	Canada	7:02.24	QAB
2	Matthew Wells	Great Britain	7:07.76	R
3	Anderson Nocetti	Brazil	7:09.08	R
4	Mattia Righetti	Italy	7:24.80	R
5	Jesús Huerta	Mexico	7:29.64	R
6	Vladimir Belonogov	Kazakhstan	7:34.66	R

==== Quarterfinal 2 ====
Rank	Rower	Nation	Time	Notes
1	Rob Waddell	New Zealand	6:54.20	QAB
2	Ivo Yanakiev	Bulgaria	7:03.24	R
~~3~~	Andris Reinholds	Latvia	~~7:06.28~~	R, DPG
4	Ján Žiška	Slovakia	7:26.21	R
5	Benjamin Tolentino	Philippines	7:29.86	R
6	Riadh Ben Khedher	Tunisia	7:59.75	R

==== Quarterfinal 3 ====
Rank	Rower	Nation	Time	Notes
1	Marcel Hacker	Germany	6:58.31	QAB
2	Václav Chalupa	Czech Republic	7:04.00	R
3	Jüri Jaanson	Estonia	7:06.58	R
4	Sergio Fernandez	Argentina	7:20.65	R
5	Rafik Amrane	Algeria	7:44.48	R
6	Muhammad Akram	Pakistan	7:54.71	R

==== Quarterfinal 4 ====
Rank	Rower	Nation	Time	Notes
1	Xeno Müller	Switzerland	6:57.38	QAB
2	Gerard Egelmeers	Netherlands	7:05.48	R
3	Don Smith	United States	7:10.34	R
4	Ali Ibrahim	Egypt	7:21.32	R
5	Félipe Leal	Chile	7:39.43	R
6	Lee In-su	South Korea	7:53.84	R

=== Repechage ===
The first two in each heat qualified for semifinals A/B, with the remainder going to semifinals C/D.

==== Repechage heat 1 ====
Rank	Rower	Nation	Time	Notes
~~1~~	Andris Reinholds	Latvia	~~7:06.40~~	QAB, DPG
2	Matthew Wells	Great Britain	7:08.19	QAB
3	Sergio Fernández González	Argentina	7:13.68	QCD
4	Félipe Leal	Chile	7:34.56	QCD
5	Vladimir Belonogov	Kazakhstan	7:36.42	QCD

==== Repechage heat 2 ====
Rank	Rower	Nation	Time	Notes
1	Jüri Jaanson	Estonia	7:05.16	QAB
2	Ivo Yanakiev	Bulgaria	7:09.22	QAB
3	Ali Ibrahim	Egypt	7:13.10	QCD
4	Jesús Huerta	Mexico	7:31.93	QCD
5	Riadh Ben Khedher	Tunisia	7:53.05	QCD

==== Repechage heat 3 ====
Rank	Rower	Nation	Time	Notes
1	Don Smith	United States	7:11.83	QAB
2	Václav Chalupa	Czech Republic	7:17.53	QAB
3	Mattia Righetti	Italy	7:21.20	QCD
4	Benjamin Tolentino	Philippines	7:29.03	QCD
5	Muhammad Akram	Pakistan	7:51.50	QCD

==== Repechage heat 4 ====
Rank	Rower	Nation	Time	Notes
1	Gerard Egelmeers	Netherlands	7:04.25	QAB
2	Ján Žiška	Slovakia	7:14.31	QAB
3	Anderson Nocetti	Brazil	7:22.13	QCD
4	Rafik Amrane	Algeria	7:42.19	QCD
5	Lee In-su	South Korea	7:45.76	QCD

=== Semifinals ===
The semifinals were held on 21 September 2000. For the C/D semifinals, the first three in each heat qualified for Final C, with the remainder going to Final D. Similarly, for the A/B semifinals, the top three went to Final A and the bottom three to Final B.

==== Semifinal C/D 1 ====
Rank	Rower	Nation	Time	Notes
1	Anderson Nocetti	Brazil	7:12.97	QC
2	Sergio Fernández González	Argentina	7:21.46	QC
3	Vladimir Belonogov	Kazakhstan	7:24.44	QC
4	Benjamin Tolentino	Philippines	7:29.86	QD
5	Jesús Huerta	Mexico	7:36.06	QD
6	Lee In-su	South Korea	7:40.03	QD

==== Semifinal C/D 2 ====
Rank	Rower	Nation	Time	Notes
1	Ali Ibrahim	Egypt	7:17.06	QC
2	Mattia Righetti	Italy	7:20.78	QC
3	Félipe Leal	Chile	7:28.78	QC
4	Rafik Amrane	Algeria	7:38.51	QD
5	Muhammad Akram	Pakistan	7:45.12	QD
6	Riadh Ben Khedher	Tunisia	7:47.86	QD

==== Semifinal A/B 1 ====
Rank	Rower	Nation	Time	Notes
1	Rob Waddell	New Zealand	6:58.01	QA
2	Derek Porter	Canada	7:00.82	QA
3	Ivo Yanakiev	Bulgaria	7:03.89	QA
4	Gerard Egelmeers	Netherlands	7:07.14	QB
5	Matthew Wells	Great Britain	7:09.68	QB
6	Don Smith	United States	7:10.69	QB

==== Semifinal A/B 2 ====
Rank	Rower	Nation	Time	Notes
1	Xeno Müller	Switzerland	7:01.86	QA
2	Marcel Hacker	Germany	7:03.47	QA
3	Jüri Jaanson	Estonia	7:06.70	QA
~~4~~	Andris Reinholds	Latvia	~~7:15.04~~	QB, DPG
5	Ján Žiška	Slovakia	7:26.51	QB
6	Václav Chalupa	Czech Republic	7:30.28	QB

=== Finals ===
==== Final D ====
Rank	Rower	Nation	Time
18	Benjamin Tolentino	Philippines	7:22.31
19	Jesús Huerta	Mexico	7:29.68
20	Rafik Amrane	Algeria	7:35.66
21	Lee In-su	South Korea	7:37.31
22	Riadh Ben Khedher	Tunisia	7:54.45
—	Muhammad Akram	Pakistan	DNS

==== Final C ====
Rank	Rower	Nation	Time
12	Ali Ibrahim	Egypt	7:01.44
13	Anderson Nocetti	Brazil	7:01.89
14	Mattia Righetti	Italy	7:08.16
15	Sergio Fernández González	Argentina	7:09.43
16	Vladimir Belonogov	Kazakhstan	7:21.44
17	Félipe Leal	Chile	7:44.48

==== Final B ====
Rank	Rower	Nation	Time	Notes
7	Gerard Egelmeers	Netherlands	6:55.29	
8	Don Smith	United States	6:59.82	
9	Matthew Wells	Great Britain	7:00.22	
10	Ján Žiška	Slovakia	7:06.96	
—	Václav Chalupa	Czech Republic	DNS	
—	Andris Reinholds	Latvia	~~6:56.33~~	DPG

==== Final A ====
Rank	Rower	Nation	Time
1st place, gold medalist(s)	Rob Waddell	New Zealand	6:48.90
2nd place, silver medalist(s)	Xeno Müller	Switzerland	6:50.55
3rd place, bronze medalist(s)	Marcel Hacker	Germany	6:50.83
4	Derek Porter	Canada	6:51.10
5	Ivo Yanakiev	Bulgaria	6:57.32
6	Jüri Jaanson	Estonia	6:59.15

== Results summary ==
Rank	Rower	Nation	Quarterfinals	Repechage	Semifinals	Finals	Notes
1st place, gold medalist(s)	Rob Waddell	New Zealand	6:54.20	Bye	6:58.01; Semifinals A/B	6:48.90; Final A	
2nd place, silver medalist(s)	Xeno Müller	Switzerland	6:57.38	Bye	7:01.86; Semifinals A/B	6:50.55; Final A	
3rd place, bronze medalist(s)	Marcel Hacker	Germany	6:58.31	Bye	7:03.47; Semifinals A/B	6:50.83; Final A	
4	Derek Porter	Canada	7:02.24	Bye	7:00.82; Semifinals A/B	6:51.10; Final A	
5	Ivo Yanakiev	Bulgaria	7:03.24	7:09.22	7:03.89; Semifinals A/B	6:57.32; Final A	
6	Jüri Jaanson	Estonia	7:06.58	7:05.16	7:06.70; Semifinals A/B	6:59.15; Final A	
7	Gerard Egelmeers	Netherlands	7:05.48	7:04.25	7:07.14; Semifinals A/B	6:55.29; Final B	
8	Don Smith	United States	7:10.34	7:11.83	7:10.69; Semifinals A/B	6:59.82; Final B	
9	Matthew Wells	Great Britain	7:07.76	7:08.19	7:09.68; Semifinals A/B	7:00.22; Final B	
10	Ján Žiška	Slovakia	7:26.21	7:14.31	7:26.51; Semifinals A/B	7:06.96; Final B	
11	Václav Chalupa	Czech Republic	7:04.00	7:17.53	7:30.28; Semifinals A/B	DNS; Final B	
12	Ali Ibrahim	Egypt	7:21.32	7:13.10	7:17.06; Semifinals C/D	7:01.44; Final C	
13	Anderson Nocetti	Brazil	7:09.08	7:22.13	7:12.97; Semifinals C/D	7:01.89; Final C	
14	Mattia Righetti	Italy	7:24.80	7:21.20	7:20.78; Semifinals C/D	7:08.16; Final C	
15	Sergio Fernández González	Argentina	7:20.65	7:13.68	7:21.46; Semifinals C/D	7:09.43; Final C	
16	Vladimir Belonogov	Kazakhstan	7:34.66	7:36.42	7:24.44; Semifinals C/D	7:21.44; Final C	
17	Félipe Leal	Chile	7:39.43	7:34.56	7:28.78; Semifinals C/D	7:44.48; Final C	
18	Benjamin Tolentino	Philippines	7:29.86	7:29.03	7:29.86; Semifinals C/D	7:22.31; Final D	
19	Jesús Huerta	Mexico	7:29.64	7:31.93	7:36.06; Semifinals C/D	7:29.68; Final D	
20	Rafik Amrane	Algeria	7:44.48	7:42.19	7:38.51; Semifinals C/D	7:35.66; Final D	
21	Lee In-su	South Korea	7:53.84	7:45.76	7:40.03; Semifinals C/D	7:37.31; Final D	
22	Riadh Ben Khedher	Tunisia	7:59.75	7:53.05	7:47.86; Semifinals C/D	7:54.45; Final D	
23	Muhammad Akram	Pakistan	7:54.71	7:51.50	7:45.12; Semifinals C/D	DNS; Final D	
—	Andris Reinholds	Latvia	~~7:06.28~~	~~7:06.40~~	~~7:15.04~~; Semifinals A/B	~~6:56.33~~; Final B	DPG
