= Yang Cuiping =

Chinese rower

Personal information
- Nationality: Chinese
- Born: 4 October 1981 (age 43); Yulin, China

Sport
- Sport: Rowing

Yang Cuiping (born 4 October 1981) is a Chinese rower. She competed in the women's eight event at the 2004 Summer Olympics.
