= Hua Lingjun =

Chinese rower

Personal information
- Nationality: Chinese
- Born: 2 September 1978 (age 48)

Sport
- Sport: Rowing

Hua Lingjun (born 2 September 1978) is a Chinese rower. He competed in two events at the 2000 Summer Olympics.
