= Lo Sing Yan =

Hong Kong rower (born 1973)

Personal information
- Nationality: Hong Konger
- Born: 13 September 1973 (age 51); Hong Kong

Sport
- Sport: Rowing

Lo Sing Yan (born 13 September 1973) is a Hong Kong rower. He competed in the men's lightweight double sculls event at the 2000 Summer Olympics.
