= Kasam Khan =

Indian rower (born 1974)

Personal information
- Nationality: Indian
- Born: 1 January 1974 (age 52)

Sport
- Sport: Rowing

Kasam Khan (born 1 January 1974) is an Indian rower. He competed in the men's coxless pair at the 2000 Summer Olympics.
