= Takehiro Kubo =

Japanese rower (born 1978)

Personal information
- Born: 19 July 1978 (age 47)

Sport
- Sport: Rowing
Medal record
Men's rowing
Representing Japan
World Rowing Championships
Gold medal – first place	2000 Zagreb	Lwt quad scull
Silver medal – second place	2005 Kaizu, Gifu	Lwt eight

Takehiro Kubo (born 19 July 1978) is a Japanese lightweight rower.

== Career ==
Kubo won a gold medal at the 2000 World Rowing Championships in Zagreb with the lightweight men's quadruple scull.
