= Lui Kam Chi =

Hong Kong rower (born 1973)

Personal information
- Nationality: Hong Konger
- Born: 24 February 1973 (age 52)

Chinese name
- Traditional Chinese: 呂錦志
- Hanyu Pinyin: Lǚ Jǐnzhì
- Yale Romanization: Léuih Gámji
- Jyutping: leoi5 gam2 zi3

Sport
- Sport: Rowing

Lui Kam Chi (born 24 February 1973) is a Hong Kong rower. He competed at the 1992 Summer Olympics and the 2000 Summer Olympics. He was the winner of a bronze medal at the 1999 Asian Rowing Championships and silver medals in multiple events at the 2001 East Asian Games. He later competed in dragon boat at the 2010 Asian Games and at the 2012 Asian Beach Games. He was elected a board member of the Hong Kong, China Rowing Association in 2016.
