= Hitoshi Hase =

Japanese rower (born 1973)

Personal information
- Born: 22 December 1973 (age 52)

Sport
- Sport: Rowing
Medal record
Men's rowing
Representing Japan
World Rowing Championships
Gold medal – first place	2000 Zagreb	Lwt quad scull
Bronze medal – third place	2001 Lucerne	Lwt quad scull

Hitoshi Hase (born 22 December 1973) is a Japanese lightweight rower. He won a gold medal at the 2000 World Rowing Championships in Zagreb with the lightweight men's quadruple scull.
