= Law Hiu Fung =

Hong Kong rower (born 1983)

Law Hiu Fung (Chinese: 羅曉鋒; Jyutping: lo^{4} hiu^{2} fung^{1}, born 13 November 1983) is a rower from Hong Kong who competed at the 2004 and 2008 Olympic Games in the men's single sculls. He was the closing ceremony flag bearer of Hong Kong at the Beijing Olympic Games.
