= Atsushi Obata =

Japanese rower (born 1973)

Personal information
- Nationality: Japanese
- Born: 15 December 1973 (age 52) Kyoto, Japan

Sport
- Sport: Rowing

Atsushi Obata (小畑 篤史, Obata Atsushi; born 15 December 1973) is a Japanese rower. He competed in the men's lightweight coxless four event at the 2000 Summer Olympics.
