= Kazushige Ura =

Japanese rower (born 1975)

Personal information
- Nationality: Japanese
- Born: 10 November 1975 (age 50) Nijō, Japan

Sport
- Sport: Rowing

Kazushige Ura (浦 和重, Ura Kazushige; born 10 November 1975) is a Japanese rower. He competed at the 2004 Summer Olympics, 2008 Summer Olympics and the 2012 Summer Olympics.
