= Zhang Xiuyun =

Chinese rower

Medal record

Women's rowing

Representing China

Olympic Games
Silver medal – second place	1996 Atlanta	Double sculls

World Rowing Championships
Gold medal – first place	1993 Račice	Quad sculls
Silver medal – second place	1994 Indianapolis	Quad sculls
Silver medal – second place	1999 St. Catharines	Double sculls

Zhang Xiuyun (Chinese: 张秀云; born 25 February 1976) is a female Chinese rower. She competed for Team China at the 2008 Summer Olympics.

== Records ==
- 1993 National Games/Asian Championships – 1st single sculls;
- 1993/1994 World Championships – 1st/2nd quadruple sculls;
- 1995 National Champions Tournament – 1st 10000 m single sculls;
- 1996 Olympic Games – 2nd double sculls;
- 2000 National Championships – 1st single sculls;
- 2003 World Championships – 5th single sculls
