= Kazuaki Mimoto =

Japanese rower (born 1972)

Personal information
- Born: 20 March 1972 (age 54)

Sport
- Sport: Rowing
Medal record
Men's rowing
Representing Japan
World Rowing Championships
Gold medal – first place	2000 Zagreb	Lwt quad scull
Bronze medal – third place	2001 Lucerne	Lwt quad scull

Kazuaki Mimoto (三本 和明, Mimoto Kazuaki; born 20 March 1972) is a Japanese lightweight rower. He competed at the 1992 (coxless pair) and 1996 Olympics (lightweight coxless four). He won a gold medal at the 2000 World Rowing Championships in Zagreb with the lightweight men's quadruple scull.
