= Daisaku Takeda =

Japanese rower (born 1973)

Personal information
- Born: 5 December 1973 (age 52) Iyo, Ehime, Japan
- Height: 178 cm (5 ft 10 in)
- Weight: 73 kg (161 lb)

Sport
- Sport: Rowing
Medal record
Men's rowing
Representing Japan
World Rowing Championships
Gold medal – first place	2000 Zagreb	Lwt quad scull

Daisaku Takeda (武田 大作, Takeda Daisaku; born 5 December 1973) is a Japanese lightweight rower. Between 1996 and 2012, he competed at five Olympic Games. He won a gold medal at the 2000 World Rowing Championships in Zagreb with the lightweight men's quadruple scull.
