= Rowing at the 2004 Summer Olympics – Men's lightweight double sculls =

Men's lightweight double sculls at the Games of the XXVIII Olympiad
- Competitors: 42 from 21 nations

Medalists
1st place, gold medalist(s)		Tomasz Kucharski; Robert Sycz	Poland
2nd place, silver medalist(s)		Frédéric Dufour; Pascal Touron	France
3rd place, bronze medalist(s)		Vasileios Polymeros; Nikolaos Skiathitis	Greece

These are the results of the Men's lightweight double sculls competition in Rowing at the 2004 Summer Olympics in Athens Greece. It was one of eight events in men's rowing that was held.

== Medalists ==
Gold	Silver	Bronze
Tomasz Kucharski and Robert Sycz (POL)	Frédéric Dufour and Pascal Touron (FRA)	Vasileios Polymeros and Nikolaos Skiathitis (GRE)

== Heats - 15 August ==
- SF denotes qualification to semifinal
- R denotes qualification to repechage

=== Heat 1 ===
Rank	Country	Athletes	Time	Notes
1	Greece	Vasileios Polymeros, Nikolaos Skiathitis	6:15.22	SF
2	Italy	Elia Luini and Leonardo Pettinari	6:19.82	R
3	Slovakia	Ľuboš Podstupka and Lukáš Babač	6:22.00	R
4	China	Zhu Zhifu and Yang Jian	6:22.64	R
5	Cuba	Armando Arrechavaleta and Yosvel Iglesiaso	6:25.14	R
6	Brazil	Thiago Gomes and José Sobral Júnior	6:33.92	R

=== Heat 2 ===
Rank	Country	Athletes	Time	Notes
1	France	Frédéric Dufour and Pascal Touron	6:14.55	SF
2	Hungary	Zsolt Hirling and Tamás Varga	6:20.98	R
3	Spain	Ruben Alvarez Hoyos and Juan Zunzunegui Guimerans	6:23.23	R
4	Japan	Kazushige Ura and Daisaku Takeda	6:24.08	R
5	Hong Kong	Lo Ting Wai and So Sau Wah	6:43.49	R

=== Heat 3 ===
Rank	Country	Athletes	Time	Notes
1	Denmark	Mads Rasmussen and Rasmus Quist Hansen	6:17.68	SF
2	Poland	Tomasz Kucharski and Robert Sycz	6:21.45	R
3	Germany	Manuel Brehmer and Ingo Euler	6:25.22	R
4	Australia	George Jelbart and Cameron Wurf	6:28.94	R
5	Uzbekistan	Sergey Bogdanov and Ruslan Naurzaliev	6:52.34	R

=== Heat 4 ===
Rank	Country	Athletes	Time	Notes
1	Ireland	Sam Lynch and Gearoid Towey	6:16.63	SF
2	United States	Steve Tucker and Greg Ruckman	6:20.00	R
3	Czech Republic	Václav Maleček and Michal Vabroušek	6:21.82	R
4	Belgium	Justin Gevaert and Wouter Van der Fraenen	6:26.25	R
5	Uruguay	Rodolfo Collazo and Joe Reboledo	6:29.20	R

== Repechages - 17 August ==
=== Repechage 1 ===
1. Japan: Kazushige Ura and Daisaku Takeda 6:17.26 -> Semifinal A/B
2. United States: Steve Tucker and Greg Ruckman 6:19.35 -> Semifinal A/B
3. Germany: Manuel Brehmer and Ingo Euler 6:21.57 -> Semifinal C/D
4. Cuba: Armando Arrechavaleta Carrera and Yosvel Iglesias Montano 6:27.89 -> Semifinal C/D

=== Repechage 2 ===
1. Poland: Tomasz Kucharski and Robert Sycz 6:20.90 -> Semifinal A/B
2. Spain: Ruben Alvarez Hoyos and Juan Zunzunegui Guimerans 6:26.66 -> Semifinal A/B
3. Uruguay: Rodolfo Collazo and Joe Reboledo Pineyrua 6:30.23 -> Semifinal C/D
4. China: Zhu Zhifu and Yang Jian 6:31.87 -> Semifinal C/D

=== Repechage 3 ===
1. Hungary: Zsolt Hirling and Tamás Varga 6:22.63 -> Semifinal A/B
2. Slovakia: Lubos Podstupka and Lukáš Babač 6:25.75 -> Semifinal A/B
3. Belgium: Justin Gevaert and Wouter van der Fraenen 6:31.18 -> Semifinal C/D
4. Uzbekistan: Sergey Bogdanov and Ruslan Naurzaliev 6:45.69 -> Semifinal C/D

=== Repechage 4 ===
1. Czech Republic: Václav Maleček and Michal Vabroušek 6:19.04 -> Semifinal A/B
2. Italy: Elia Luini and Leonardo Pettinari 6:21.22 -> Semifinal A/B
3. Australia: George Jelbart and Cameron Wurf 6:26.10 -> Semifinal C/D
4. Brazil: Thiago Gomes and Jose Sobral, Jr. 6:33.66 -> Semifinal C/D
5. Hong Kong: Ting Wai Lo and Sau Wah So 6:41.09 -> Semifinal C/D

== Semifinals - 19 August ==
=== Semifinal A ===
1. Poland: Tomasz Kucharski and Robert Sycz 6:14.91 -> Final A
2. Greece: Vasileios Polymeros and Nikolaos Skiathitis 6:17.12 -> Final A
3. Denmark: Mads Rasmussen and Rasmus Quist Hansen 6:17.85 -> Final A
4. United States: Steve Tucker and Greg Ruckman 6:21.46 -> Final B
5. Czech Republic: Václav Maleček and Michal Vabroušek 6:23.17 -> Final B
6. Slovakia: Luboš Podstupka and Lukáš Babač 6:29.44 -> Final B

=== Semifinal B ===
1. France: Frédéric Dufour and Pascal Touron 6:16.33 -> Final A
2. Hungary: Zsolt Hirling and Tamás Varga 6:18.23 -> Final A
3. Japan: Kazushige Ura and Daisaku Takeda 6:18.51 -> Final A
4. Ireland: Sam Lynch and Gearoid Towey 6:19.09 -> Final B
5. Italy: Elia Luini and Leonardo Pettinari 6:23.72 -> Final B
6. Spain: Ruben Alvarez Hoyos and Juan Zunzunegui Guimerans 6:30.15 -> Final B

=== Semifinal C ===
1. Germany: Manuel Brehmer and Ingo Euler 6:23.22 -> Final C
2. Belgium: Justin Gevaert and Wouter van der Fraenen 6:25.34 -> Final C
3. China: Zhu Zhifu and Yang Jian 6:25.97 -> Final C
4. Brazil: Thiago Gomes and Jose Sobral, Jr. 6:26.98

=== Semifinal D ===
1. Australia: George Jelbart and Cameron Wurf 6:27.68 -> Final C
2. Cuba: Armando Arrechavaleta Carrera and Yosvel Iglesias Montano 6:28.09 -> Final C
3. Uruguay: Rodolfo Collazo and Joe Reboledo Pineyrua 6:29.39 -> Final C
4. Hong Kong: Lo Ting Wai and So Sau Wah 6:37.03
5. Uzbekistan: Sergey Bogdanov and Ruslan Naurzaliev 6:45.47

== Finals ==
=== Final A - 22 August ===
1. Poland: Tomasz Kucharski and Robert Sycz 6:20.93
2. France: Frédéric Dufour and Pascal Touron 6:21.46
3. Greece: Vasileios Polymeros and Nikolaos Skiathitis 6:23.23
4. Denmark: Mads Rasmussen and Rasmus Quist Hansen 6:23.92
5. Hungary: Zsolt Hirling and Tamás Varga 6:24.69
6. Japan: Kazushige Ura and Daisaku Takeda 6:24.98

=== Final B - 21 August ===
1. United States: Steve Tucker and Greg Ruckman 6:45.20
2. Spain: Ruben Alvarez Hoyos and Juan Zunzunegui Guimerans 6:46.48
3. Czech Republic: Václav Maleček and Michal Vabroušek 6:46.77
4. Ireland: Sam Lynch and Gearoid Towey 6:49.26
5. Slovakia: Lubos Podstupka and Lukáš Babač 6:58.78
6. Italy: Elia Luini and Leonardo Pettinari 7:01.86

=== Final C - 21 August ===
1. Germany: Manuel Brehmer and Ingo Euler 6:45.62
2. Cuba: Armando Arrechavaleta Carrera and Yosvel Iglesias Montano 6:48.50
3. Belgium: Justin Gevaert and Wouter van der Fraenen 6:50.07
4. Australia: George Jelbart and Cameron Wurf 6:51.32
5. China: Zhu Zhifu and Yang Jian 6:58.88
6. Uruguay: Rodolfo Collazo and Joe Reboledo Pineyrua 7:03.72
