= Rowing at the 2006 Asian Games – Men's lightweight double sculls =

Men's lightweight double sculls at the 2006 Asian Games
- Venue: West Bay Lagoon
- Date: 3–6 December 2006
- Competitors: 26 from 13 nations

Medalists
gold medal	Takahiro Suda; Hideki Omoto	Japan
silver medal	Ruthtanaphol Theppibal; Anupong Thainjam	Thailand
bronze medal	Kiran Yalamanchi; Bijender Singh	India

The men's lightweight double sculls competition at the 2006 Asian Games in Doha was held from 3 December to 6 December at the West Bay Lagoon.

Since Doha was scarce of water the distance had to be shortened from standard 2000 meters to 1000 meters.

== Schedule ==
All times are Arabia Standard Time (UTC+03:00)

Date	Time	Event
Sunday, 3 December 2006	10:40	Heats
Monday, 4 December 2006	10:10	Repechages
Tuesday, 5 December 2006	09:30	Semifinals
Wednesday, 6 December 2006	10:00	Finals

== Results ==
=== Heats ===
- Qualification: 1 → Semifinals A/B (SA/B), 2–4 → Repechages (R)

==== Heat 1 ====
Rank	Team	Time	Notes
1	India (IND); Kiran Yalamanchi; Bijender Singh	4:15.29	SA/B
2	North Korea (PRK); Kim Kyong-un; Pae Sang-hyok	4:22.67	R
3	Vietnam (VIE); Nguyễn Thế Phong; Phan Thanh Hào	4:23.55	R
4	Kazakhstan (KAZ); Ivan Kharitonov; Artyom Issupov	4:25.30	R

==== Heat 2 ====
Rank	Team	Time	Notes
1	Hong Kong (HKG); Lo Ting Wai; So Sau Wah	4:24.47	SA/B
2	Uzbekistan (UZB); Damir Naurzaliev; Sergey Bogdanov	4:30.71	R
3	Thailand (THA); Ruthtanaphol Theppibal; Anupong Thainjam	4:42.48	R

==== Heat 3 ====
Rank	Team	Time	Notes
1	Japan (JPN); Takahiro Suda; Hideki Omoto	4:19.67	SA/B
2	Philippines (PHI); Alvin Amposta; Nilo Cordova	4:42.87	R
3	Sri Lanka (SRI); Kamal Chandana; Hewa Amaradasa	6:02.42	R

==== Heat 4 ====
Rank	Team	Time	Notes
1	Chinese Taipei (TPE); Wen Kuang-cheng; Lin Yen-chen	4:34.07	SA/B
2	Pakistan (PAK); Naimat Karim; Muhammad Akram	4:39.84	R
3	Iraq (IRQ); Muayied Abdul-Latif; Hamza Hussein	4:40.31	R

=== Repechages ===
- Qualification: 1 → Semifinals A/B (SA/B), 2–3 → Semifinals C/D (SC/D)

==== Repechage 1 ====
Rank	Team	Time	Notes
1	Kazakhstan (KAZ); Ivan Kharitonov; Artyom Issupov	3:49.87	SA/B
2	Iraq (IRQ); Muayied Abdul-Latif; Hamza Hussein	3:52.27	SC/D
3	Philippines (PHI); Alvin Amposta; Nilo Cordova	3:58.95	SC/D

==== Repechage 2 ====
Rank	Team	Time	Notes
1	Vietnam (VIE); Nguyễn Thế Phong; Phan Thanh Hào	3:56.81	SA/B
2	Pakistan (PAK); Naimat Karim; Muhammad Akram	4:04.38	SC/D

==== Repechage 3 ====
Rank	Team	Time	Notes
1	Thailand (THA); Ruthtanaphol Theppibal; Anupong Thainjam	3:50.30	SA/B
2	North Korea (PRK); Kim Kyong-un; Pae Sang-hyok	4:03.26	SC/D

==== Repechage 4 ====
Rank	Team	Time	Notes
1	Uzbekistan (UZB); Damir Naurzaliev; Sergey Bogdanov	4:06.36	SA/B
2	Sri Lanka (SRI); Kamal Chandana; Hewa Amaradasa	4:34.67	SC/D

=== Semifinals ===
- Qualification semifinal C/D 1: 1–2 → Final C (FC), 3 → Final D (FD)
- Qualification semifinal C/D 2: 1 → Final C (FC), 2 → Final D (FD)
- Qualification semifinals A/B: 1–2 → Final A (FA), 3–4 → Final B (FB)

==== Semifinal C/D 1 ====
Rank	Team	Time	Notes
1	North Korea (PRK); Kim Kyong-un; Pae Sang-hyok	3:37.35	FC
2	Philippines (PHI); Alvin Amposta; Nilo Cordova	3:44.15	FC
3	Pakistan (PAK); Naimat Karim; Muhammad Akram	3:55.35	FD

==== Semifinal C/D 2 ====
Rank	Team	Time	Notes
1	Iraq (IRQ); Muayied Abdul-Latif; Hamza Hussein	3:51.64	FC
2	Sri Lanka (SRI); Kamal Chandana; Hewa Amaradasa	4:12.23	FD

==== Semifinal A/B 1 ====
Rank	Team	Time	Notes
1	Kazakhstan (KAZ); Ivan Kharitonov; Artyom Issupov	3:36.62	FA
2	India (IND); Kiran Yalamanchi; Bijender Singh	3:39.02	FA
3	Hong Kong (HKG); Lo Ting Wai; So Sau Wah	3:39.56	FB
4	Uzbekistan (UZB); Damir Naurzaliev; Sergey Bogdanov	3:43.82	FB

==== Semifinal A/B 2 ====
Rank	Team	Time	Notes
1	Japan (JPN); Takahiro Suda; Hideki Omoto	3:32.69	FA
2	Thailand (THA); Ruthtanaphol Theppibal; Anupong Thainjam	3:34.23	FA
3	Chinese Taipei (TPE); Wen Kuang-cheng; Lin Yen-chen	3:40.43	FB
4	Vietnam (VIE); Nguyễn Thế Phong; Phan Thanh Hào	3:41.53	FB

=== Finals ===
==== Final D ====
Rank	Team	Time
1	Pakistan (PAK); Naimat Karim; Muhammad Akram	4:02.44
2	Sri Lanka (SRI); Kamal Chandana; Hewa Amaradasa	4:08.87

==== Final C ====
Rank	Team	Time
1	North Korea (PRK); Kim Kyong-un; Pae Sang-hyok	3:29.42
2	Iraq (IRQ); Muayied Abdul-Latif; Hamza Hussein	3:34.23
3	Philippines (PHI); Alvin Amposta; Nilo Cordova	3:36.96

==== Final B ====
Rank	Team	Time
1	Uzbekistan (UZB); Damir Naurzaliev; Sergey Bogdanov	3:26.18
2	Vietnam (VIE); Nguyễn Thế Phong; Phan Thanh Hào	3:28.04
3	Chinese Taipei (TPE); Wen Kuang-cheng; Lin Yen-chen	3:28.31
4	Hong Kong (HKG); Lo Ting Wai; So Sau Wah	3:44.76

==== Final A ====
Rank	Team	Time
1st place, gold medalist(s)	Japan (JPN); Takahiro Suda; Hideki Omoto	3:19.29
2nd place, silver medalist(s)	Thailand (THA); Ruthtanaphol Theppibal; Anupong Thainjam	3:19.92
3rd place, bronze medalist(s)	India (IND); Kiran Yalamanchi; Bijender Singh	3:26.01
4	Kazakhstan (KAZ); Ivan Kharitonov; Artyom Issupov	3:30.88
