= 2000 World Rowing Championships =

International rowing event

- Venue: Jarun
- Location: Zagreb, Croatia
- Dates: 1 to 6 August

The 2000 World Rowing Championships were World Rowing Championships that were held from 1 to 6 August 2000 in conjunction with the World Junior Rowing Championships in Zagreb, Croatia. Since 2000 was an Olympic year for rowing, the World Championships did not include Olympic events scheduled for the 2000 Summer Olympics.

== Medal summary ==
=== Men's events ===
Event	Gold	Time	Silver	Time	Bronze	Time
M4+	Great Britain; Rick Dunn (b); Toby Garbett (2); Graham Smith (3); Steve Williams (s); Alistair Potts (c)	6:16.81	United States; Ben Holbrook (b); James Neil (2); Garrett Klugh (3); Ryan Torgerson (s); Jeffrey Lindy (c)	6:18.53	Germany; Lars Erdmann (b); Wolfram Huhn (2); Lars Krisch (3); Andreas Werner (s); Joerg Dederding (c)	6:21.57
M2+	United States; Matthew Guerrieri (b); Kurt Borcherding (s); Nicholas Anderson (c)	7:07.15	Romania; Daniel Măstăcan (b); Nicolae Țaga (s); Marin Gheorghe (c)	7:10.11	France; Vincent Maliszewski (b); Bernard Roche (s); Anthony Cornet (c)	7:10.66
Men's lightweight events
LM1x	Czech Republic; Michal Vabroušek	7:21.32	Ireland; Sam Lynch	7:22.02	Slovakia; Lubos Podstupka	7:27.94
LM4x	Japan; Hitoshi Hase (b); Takehiro Kubo (2); Kazuaki Mimoto (3); Daisaku Takeda (s)	6:06.43	Italy; Simone Forlani (b); Daniele Gilardoni (2); Franco Sancassani (3); Mauro Baccelli (s)	6:08.84	Spain; Juan Luis Aguirre Barco (b); Rubén Álvarez (2); Alberto Domínguez (3); Juan Zunzunegui (s)	6:09.34
LM2-	Canada; Ben Storey (b); Edward Winchester (s)	6:49.55	Great Britain; Peter Haining (b); Nick Strange (s)	6:50.18	Denmark; Morten Hansen Skov (b); Jesper Krogh (s)	6:50.26
LM8+	United States; Erik Miller (b); David Mack (2); John Cashman (3); Gabe Winkler (4); William Fedyna (5); Martin Schwartz (6); Angus Maclaurin (7); Steve Warner (s); Joshua Fien-Helfman (c)	5:55.04	Great Britain; Phil Baker (b); Matt Beechey (2); James Brown (3); Ned Kittoe (4); Stephen Lee (5); James McGarva (6); Jim McNiven (7); Tim Middleton (s); Christian Cormack (c)	5:58.06	Australia; Andrew Black (b); Shane Broad (2); Andrew Butler (3); Ben Cureton (4); Glen Loftus (5); Karl Parker (6); Matthew Russell (7); Michael Wiseman (s); Kenneth Chan (c)	5:59.70

=== Women's events ===
Event	Gold	Time	Silver	Time	Bronze	Time
W4-	Belarus; Iryna Bazyleuskaya (b); Natallia Helakh (2); Olga Tratsevskaya (3); Marina Znak (s)	6:44.90	Poland; Aneta Bełka (b); Honorata Motylewska (2); Iwona Tybinkowska (3); Iwona Zygmunt (s)	6:47.16	Romania; Marioara Ciobanu-Popescu (b); Crina Serediuc (2); Doina Spircu-Craciun (3); Aurica Barascu-Chirita (s)	6:49.90
Women's lightweight events
LW1x	Finland; Laila Finska-Bezerra	8:13.50	Germany; Angelika Brand	8:20.53	Ireland; Sinead Jennings	8:24.30
LW2-	Great Britain; Malindi Myers (b); Miriam Taylor (s)	7:32.93	United States; Stacey Borgman (b); Catherine Humblet (s)	7:35.80	Germany; Janet Radünzel (b); Gunda Reimers (s)	7:49.94
LW4x	Germany; Maja Darmstadt (b); Michelle Darvill (2); Anna Kleinz (3); Karin Stephan (s)	6:54.16	Australia; Eliza Blair (b); Sally Causby (2); Amber Halliday (3); Catriona Roach (s)	6:56.78	China; Tan Meiyun (b); Wang Yanni (2); Sun Yue (3); Song Xiujuan (s)	6:58.21

== Medal table ==
Place	Nation	1st place, gold medalist(s)	2nd place, silver medalist(s)	3rd place, bronze medalist(s)	Total
1	United States	2	2	0	4
1	Great Britain	2	2	0	4
3	Germany	1	1	2	4
4	Japan	1	0	0	1
4	Canada	1	0	0	1
4	Finland	1	0	0	1
4	Czech Republic	1	0	0	1
4	Belarus	1	0	0	1
9	Australia	0	1	1	2
9	Ireland	0	1	1	2
9	Romania	0	1	1	2
12	Italy	0	1	0	1
12	Poland	0	1	0	1
14	France	0	0	1	1
14	China	0	0	1	1
14	Spain	0	0	1	1
14	Slovakia	0	0	1	1
14	Denmark	0	0	1	1
Total		10	10	10	30
