= Tripician =

Tripician is a surname. Notable people with the surname include:

- Joe Tripician (born 1953), American film producer, writer, screenwriter, film director, songwriter and playwright
- Nicholas Tripician (born 1978), American rower
- Wendy Tripician (born 1974), American rower
