= Karl Parker (rower) =

Australian rower

Personal information
- Born: 2 October 1978 (age 47)

Sport
- Country: Australia
- Sport: Rowing
- Club: Nepean Rowing Club
Medal record
Men's rowing
Representing Australia
World Rowing Championships
Bronze medal – third place	2000 Zagreb	LM8-
World Rowing U23 Championships
Gold medal – first place	1999 Hamburg	BLM1X
Silver medal – second place	1997 Milan	BLM2X

Karl Parker (born 2 October 1978) is an Australian former lightweight rower who represented at World Championships in both sculling and sweep-oared boats. He was an U23 Australian national and world champion, and won a bronze medal at the 2000 World Rowing Championships.

== Club and state rowing ==
Raised in Penrith, New South Wales Parker's senior rowing was from the Nepean Rowing Club.

Parker first rowed at the Interstate Regatta within the Australian Rowing Championships in 2002 in a New South Wales lightweight four which contested the Penrith Cup. He rowed in again in the lightweight four for New South Wales in 2004.

In 1999 in Nepean colours he won the national U23 lightweight sculling title at the Australian Rowing Championships.

== International representative rowing ==
Parker made his first Australian representative appearance in 1995 in the stroke seat of a quad scull which competed at the 1995 Nations Cup in Groningen and finished in eight place. That same crew went to the 1995 Junior World Rowing Championships in Poznan where the entire Australian squad was affected by food poisoning at the regatta accommodation. That crew finished in thirteenth place. In 1995 he was selected in an Australian double-scull which contested a junior Trans-Tasman series against New Zealand crews. In 1996 he again contested the Trans Tasman junior challenge series in Sydney.

In 1997 he was selected with Glen Loftus to row Australia's lightweight double scull at the World Rowing U23 Championships in Milan where they raced to a silver medal. He made his Australian senior representative debut in 1999 in a lightweight single scull at the World Rowing Cup III in Lucerne. That year he was also Australia's lightweight single sculler at the U23 World Championships in Hamburg where he won a gold medal and an U23 world championship title. He then was Australia's lightweight single sculling entrant at the 1999 World Rowing Championships in St Catharines, Canada where he missed the A final and rowed to an overall seventh place finish.

In 2000 Parker moved into selection contention in sweep-oared boats. He was in the five seat of the Australian men's lightweight eight when they won gold at the World Rowing Cup III in Lucerne and the held his seat for the 2000 World Rowing Championships in Zagreb where the eight rowed to a bronze medal.

Parker rowed on in both boat classes in 2001. With Dan Stewart he rowed a lightweight double scull to a fourth placing at the World Rowing Cup IV in Munich. They took that same boat to the 2001 World Rowing Championships in Munich where they finished in overall seventh place. Parker doubled up in the lightweight eight and was again seated at five in their sixth place finish. Those championships marked Parker's last Australian representative outing.
