= David Mack =

David Mack may refer to:

- David Mack (police officer) (born 1961), professional runner, police officer, and bank robber
- David Mack (politician) (1953–2023), South Carolina politician
- David Mack (rower), American lightweight rower
- David Alan Mack (born 1969), American television scriptwriter and novelist
- David Lyle Mack, American diplomat
- David S. Mack (born 1941), American businessman
- David W. Mack (born 1972), American comic book artist and writer
