= Yang Jian (rower) =

Chinese rower

Yang Jian (Chinese: 杨健, born 25 August 1981) is a Chinese rower who competed in the Men's lightweight double sculls event at the 2004 Summer Olympics. His partner was Zhu Zhifu.
