= Ben Storey (rower) =

Canadian lightweight rower (born 1974)

Personal information
- Born: April 1, 1974 (age 52)

Sport
- Sport: Rowing
Medal record
Men's rowing
Representing Canada
World Rowing Championships
Gold medal – first place	2000 Zagreb	Lwt coxless pair
Bronze medal – third place	1996 Motherwell	Lwt eight
Bronze medal – third place	1997 Aiguebelette	Lwt eight

Ben Storey (born April 1, 1974) is a Canadian lightweight rower. He won a gold medal at the 2000 World Rowing Championships in Zagreb with Edward Winchester in the lightweight men's coxless pair.
