= Helfman =

Helfman is a surname. Notable people with the name include:

- Don Helfman (1926–1984), aka Don Elliott, American jazz trumpeter, vibraphonist, vocalist and mellophone player
- Hesya Helfman (1855–1882), Belarusian-Jewish revolutionary member of Narodnaya Volya, implicated in the assassination of Alexander II of Russia
- Joshua Fien-Helfman, American coxswain
- Max Helfman (1901–1963), Polish-born American Jewish composer, choral conductor, pianist, singer and educator
- Michal Helfman (born 1973), Israeli artist
- Muriel Nezhnie Helfman (1934–2002), known as Nezhnie, American artist, weaving large tapestries throughout 1956–1992
