= Maleček =

Maleček (feminine Malečková) is a Czech surname. Notable people include:

- Antonín Maleček (1909–1964), Czech table tennis player
- Jesika Malečková (born 1994), Czech tennis player
- Josef Maleček (1903–1982), Czech ice hockey player
- Václav Maleček (born 1974), Czech rower
