= Steve Williams (rower) =

English rower

Steve Willams OBE
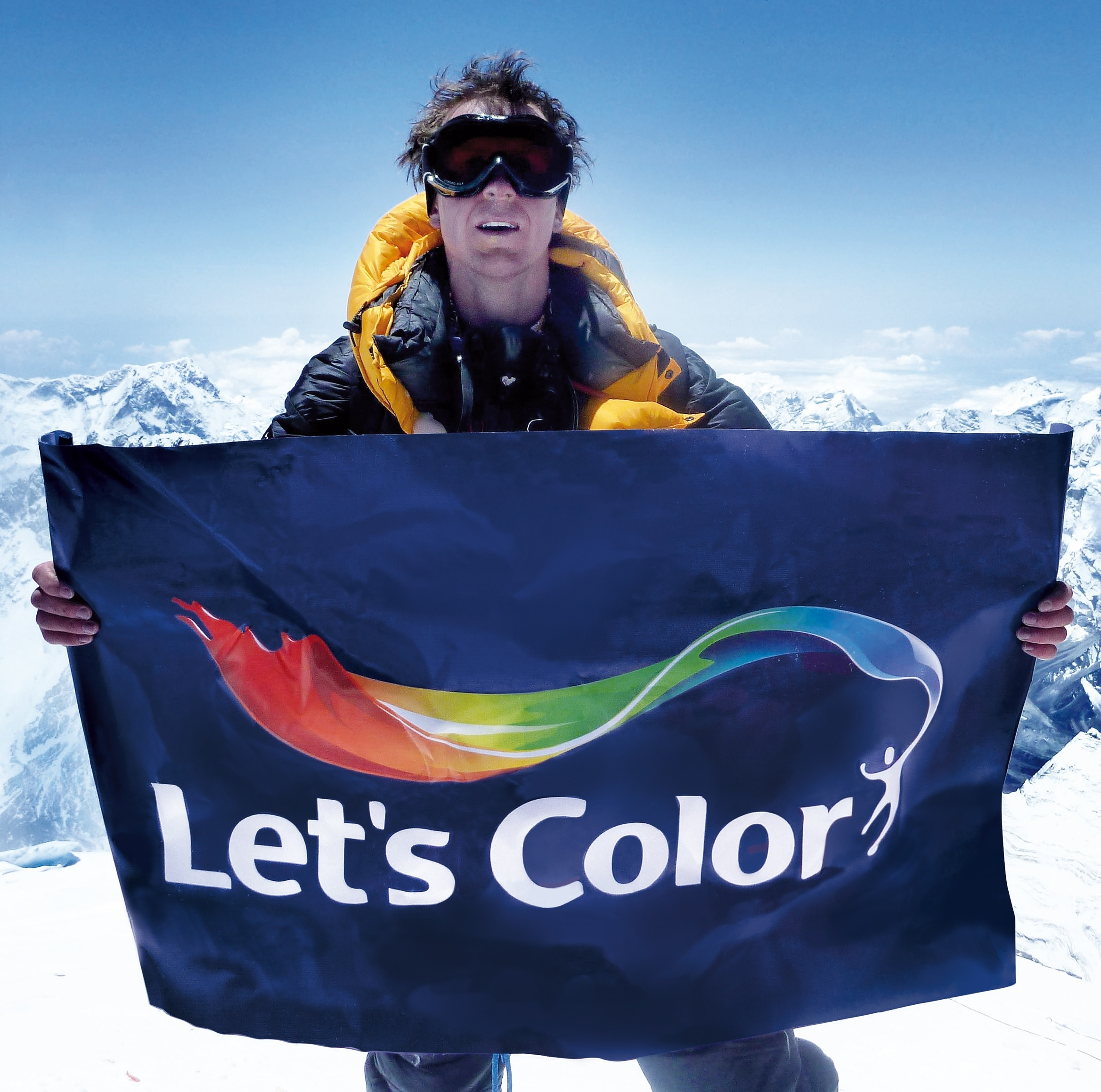
- Williams on the summit of Mount Everest in May 2011

Personal information
- Full name: Stephen David Williams
- Nationality: Great Britain
- Born: 15 April 1976 (age 50) Royal Leamington Spa, United Kingdom
- Education: Oxford Brookes University
- Height: 1.89 m (6 ft 2 in)
Medal record
Men's rowing
Representing Great Britain
Olympic Games
Gold medal – first place	2004 Athens	Coxless four
Gold medal – first place	2008 Beijing	Coxless four
World Championships
Gold medal – first place	2000 Zagreb	Coxed four
Gold medal – first place	2001 Lucerne	Coxless four
Gold medal – first place	2005 Gifu	Coxless four
Gold medal – first place	2006 Eton	Coxless four
Silver medal – second place	2002 Seville	Coxless four
Silver medal – second place	2003 Milan	Coxless four
- Updated on 31 January 2016

Stephen David Williams OBE (born 15 April 1976 in Leamington Spa) is an English rower and double Olympic champion. In April and May 2011, Williams walked to the North Pole and achieved the summit of Mount Everest.

== Education ==
Williams was educated at Monkton Combe School, Bath, where he began rowing aged 13. He attended Oxford Brookes University where he studied History and Town planning.

== International career ==
Williams made his full international debut in 1998 at the age of 22. He partnered Fred Scarlett in the coxless pair, and came sixth in his first world championships. A year later he partnered Simon Dennis in the same event, this time finishing fifth. In 2000 both Scarlett and Dennis won seats in the GB Eight for the Olympics in Sydney but Williams just missed out, and instead was a member of the Coxed Four which won a gold medal at the World Championships in Zagreb for non-Olympic events. In 2001 he was again world champion, this time in the Coxless Four, and won the silver medal in the same discipline in both 2002 and 2003.

With Matthew Pinsent, James Cracknell and Ed Coode, Williams won Olympic gold at the 2004 Summer Olympics in Athens in the men's coxless four.

Williams was the only member of the 2004 Olympic crew to continue racing in the 2005 season, joining Alex Partridge, Pete Reed and Andrew Triggs Hodge in the coxless four, again winning the World Championship that year and in 2006, before coming in fourth at the 2007 world championships. In 2008, Partridge was replaced in the four by Cambridge Blue Tom James, and - despite an injury-torn season - the quartet became Olympic Champions, defeating the Australian boat by 1.28s on the day dubbed 'Super Saturday' by the media owing to the large GB medal haul. The Australians led for much of the race before a push by the British boat overhauled them in the last 400 m.

== Current occupation ==
Williams was appointed as a fitness consultant to Andy Liddell for Ipswich Town Football Club on 3 July 2012.

Having been appointed a Member of the Order of the British Empire (MBE) in the 2005 New Year Honours, Williams was promoted to Officer of the Order of the British Empire (OBE) in the 2009 New Year Honours.

On 22 January 2010 he announced his retirement from rowing.

He has been welcomed back to Monkton Combe School on several occasions, rowing in a Monkton Bluefriars old boys' boat at a school regatta.

== Achievements ==
- Olympic Medals: 2 Gold
- World Championship Medals: 4 Gold, 2 Silver

=== Olympic Games ===
- 2008 – Gold, Coxless Four (with Andy Hodge, Pete Reed, Tom James)
- 2004 – Gold, Coxless Four (with Matthew Pinsent, James Cracknell, Ed Coode)

=== World Championships ===
- 2007 – 4th, Coxless Four (with Pete Reed, Alex Partridge and Andrew Triggs Hodge)
- 2006 – Gold, Coxless Four (with Pete Reed, Alex Partridge and Andrew Triggs Hodge)
- 2005 – Gold, Coxless Four (with Pete Reed, Alex Partridge and Andrew Triggs Hodge)
- 2003 – Silver, Coxless Four (with Josh West, Rick Dunn and Toby Garbett)
- 2002 – Silver, Coxless Four (with Josh West, Rick Dunn and Toby Garbett)
- 2001 – Gold, Coxless Four (with Ed Coode, Rick Dunn and Toby Garbett)
- 2000 – Gold, Coxed Four (with Alistair Potts, Rick Dunn, Toby Garbett and Graham Smith)
- 1999 – 5th, Coxless Pair (with Simon Dennis)
- 1998 – 6th, Coxless Pair (with Fred Scarlett)

== See also ==
- Leander Club (where Steve Williams is a member)
