= Catriona Roach =

Australian rower

Personal information
- Born: 10 May 1969 (age 57)

Sport
- Sport: Rowing
- Club: UTS Haberfield Rowing Club
Medal record
Women's rowing
Representing Australia
World Rowing Championships
Gold medal – first place	2001 Lucerne	LW4x
Silver medal – second place	2000 Zagreb	LW4x

Catriona Roach (born 10 May 1969 in Bathurst, New South Wales) is an Australian former lightweight rower - a national champion and a 2001 World Champion.

== Club and state rowing ==
Roach's senior rowing was done with the UTS Haberfield Rowing Club in Sydney.

Roach raced in New South Wales representative women's lightweight quad sculls who contested the Victoria Cup at the Interstate Regatta in 1999, 2000, 2001 (to victory).

== International representative rowing ==
Roach made her first Australian senior representative appearance at the 2000 World Rowing Cup III in Lucerne, Switzerland. The next month that same crew contested the lightweight quad scull at the 2000 World Rowing Championships in Zagreb, Croatia and Roach won a silver medal stroking the crew of Sally Causby, Amber Halliday and Eliza Blair.

The following year at Lucerne 2001 that crew with Blair changed out for Josephine Lips won the gold medal and the lightweight quad scull world championship title. They set two world records in the process. Roach was seated at bow.

== After rowing ==
In 2008 her name was added to Bathurst District Sport and Recreation Council's International Sports Honour Board. She works in interior design.
