= Garrett Klugh =

American rower

Personal information
- Born: Los Angeles, California, U.S. November 18, 1974 (age 51)
Medal record
Men's rowing
Representing United States
World Rowing Championships
Gold medal – first place	1999 St. Catharines	M4+
Silver medal – second place	2000 Zagreb	M4+
Bronze medal – third place	2002 Seville	M8+

Garrett Klugh (born November 18, 1974, in Los Angeles, California) is an American rower.
