= Justine Joyce =

Australian rower (born 1974)

Personal information
- Born: 14 March 1974 (age 52)

Sport
- Sport: Rowing
- Club: Hawthorn Rowing Club; Yarra Yarra Rowing Club; Banks Rowing Club
Medal record
Women's rowing
Representing Australia
World Rowing Championships
| Gold medal – first place | 1997 Aiquebelette | LW2- |

Justine Joyce (born 14 March 1974) is an Australian former representative rower. She is national champion and a world champion and is the standing world record holder in the women's lightweight coxless pair.

== Club and state rowing ==
Joyce's senior rowing was done from three Melbourne clubs - Hawthorn, Yarra Yarra and the Banks Rowing Club. She was a sweep oared rower in the days when national and world championship lightweight titles for women's fours were contested in sweep oared boats.

Joyce raced in Victorian representative women's crews who contested the Victoria Cup at the Interstate Regatta. Till 1998 that race was in lightweight coxless four and Joyce raced in Victorian fours in 1996, 1997 and 1998. She stroked those crews to victory in 1997 and 1998 In 1999 she was selected in the Victorian women's heavyweight eight to contest the ULVA Trophy. She was in the two seat for the 1999 Victorian win.

== International representative rowing ==
Joyce made her Australian representative debut in a lightweight coxless pair at the 1996 World Rowing Championships, a lightweight only regatta in Strathclyde, Scotland. She raced with her Victorian team-mate Eliza Blair to a fifth place.

The following year at Aiguebelette 1997 paired with Joyce, Blair won World Championship gold in a lightweight coxless pair. As a result of the women's lightweight coxless pair being retired from international racing in 1997, Joyce's 7:18:32 time set with Blair is the standing world's best time in that event.
