= William Plifka =

American rower

Personal information
- Born: May 8, 1977 (age 49)

Sport
- Sport: Rowing
Medal record
Men's rowing
Representing United States
World Rowing Championships
Gold medal – first place	1999 St. Catharines	Lwt eight
Silver medal – second place	1998 Cologne	Lwt eight

William Plifka (born May 8, 1977) is an American lightweight rower. He won a gold medal at the 1999 World Rowing Championships in St. Catharines with the lightweight men's eight.
