= Commercial Rowing Club, Dublin =

Sports club in Dublin, Ireland

Commercial Rowing Club
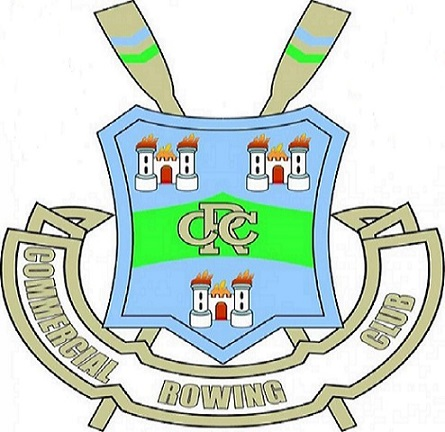

- Location: Islandbridge, Dublin, Ireland
- Coordinates: 53.346474°N 6.319968°W
- Home water: River Liffey
- Founded: 1856
- Affiliations: Rowing Ireland
- Website: www.commercialrc.ie

Events
- Commercial Regatta, Metro Regatta

Notable members
- Niall O'Toole, George Rae

Commercial Rowing Club is a sports club located in Dublin, affiliated with Rowing Ireland. Commercial Rowing Club facilitates competitive rowing for Juniors (under 18 years of age)and Adults (including Novices, Intermediates, Seniors and Veterans). The club is open to male and female athletes. The club colours are Myrtle Green, White & Azure Blue.

The Commercial Rowing Club Boathouse is located at Islandbridge, where the calm protected waters of the upper Liffey enable rowing year-round. Commercial also has access to the shared boathouse on Blessington Lake in Wicklow.

== History ==
Commercial Rowing Club was founded in Ringsend in 1856. It is the second oldest rowing club in Ireland. The name dates an era when all non-university clubs were designated ‘commercial’. The original membership was drawn from the Commercial heart of Dublin, tailors, bankers and other shopkeepers of Henry Street and Grafton Street and the boat house was originally located in Ringsend. To avoid the inconvenience and dangers of the Tides and the port traffic, Commercial moved upstream from Ringsend to the peaceful waters of Islandbridge in 1942 to take over the premises of Dublin Rowing Club, which had become insolvent.

In the sixties recruitment was predominantly among young working men who rowed mainly in Novice grades. With the boathouse locked up for the 1969 season the club decided to go in an entirely different direction and bring in juniors in Big Numbers in the seventies. Oarswomen had to be secretly introduced and trained to a standard where they would win at their first regatta. The site of a Commercial “ladies” crew in front on the winning straight was too much for even the most hardened misogynist and the girls were finally accepted in the club. In no time at all the membership went from 3 to 50 or 60 of all ages and both sexes.

== Fleet ==
In 2015, Commercial Boathouse contained the following fleet of boats for members' use: -

- 46 single sculls
- 6 double sculls
- 4 pairs
- 3 coxless quads
- 5 coxed quads
- 2 coxed fours
- 8 eights
- 21 Concept II ergometers

== Achievements ==
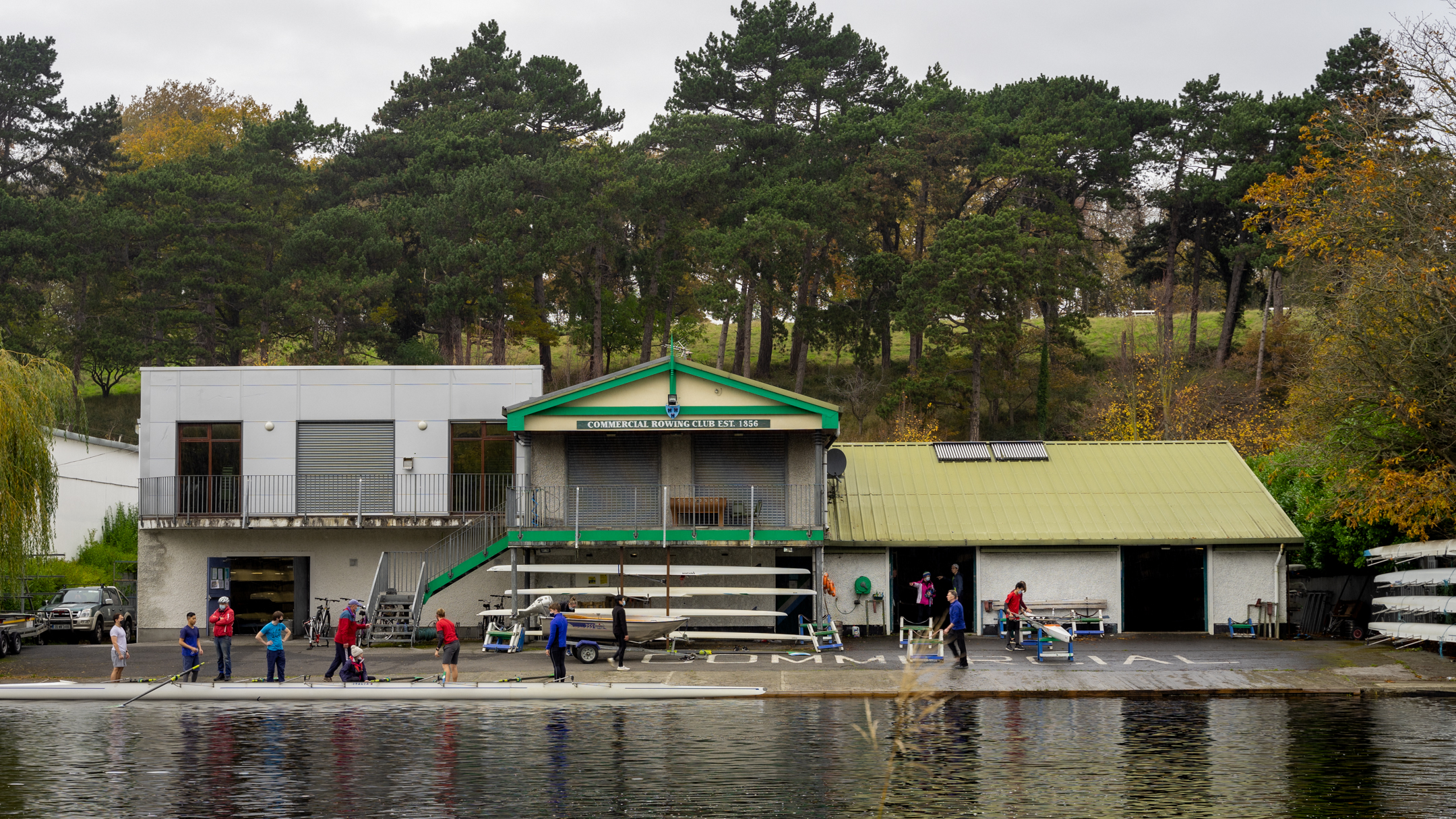
Commercial Rowing Club's Clubhouse on the River Liffey.

The development of Commercial coincided with a new policy of the IARU to encourage small boat rowing. By the year 2000, Commercial Rowing Club had won nearly 100 Irish National Championship medals. This placed the club in second place in Ireland.

At the 1991 World Rowing Championships in Vienna, a sculler from Commercial RC named Niall O'Toole won a gold medal in the Men's Lightweight Single Scull, breaking the world record in a time of 6m:49.49s in the process. This was Ireland's first gold medal in any Rowing World Championship event. O'Toole went on to compete in three Olympic Games. In 1991 and 1994, O'Toole was presented with the Texaco All Star award. The 1990s brought in a total of five World Championship medals and several u/23 medals.

== Regattas ==
Commercial Rowing Club has been strongly represented on the organizing committee for the Dublin Metropolitan Regatta (aka "Metro") since 1869. Outside of Metro, Commercial also regularly hosts its own regatta and, by 2008, Commercial had hosted its 26th regatta. Initially the regatta was for women's events only, but men's events were added in 1986.
