= Ryan Torgerson =

American rower

Medal record

Men's rowing

Representing United States

World Rowing Championships
Silver medal – second place	2000 Zagreb	M4+
Silver medal – second place	2003 Milan	M8+
Bronze medal – third place	2002 Seville	M8+

Ryan Patrick Torgerson (September 20, 1972 – May 30, 2011) was an American rower. He was born in Cleveland Heights, Ohio and served in the United States Marine Corps. Torgerson died at his home in Wauconda, Illinois at the age of 38.
