= John Cashman (rower) =

American rower (born 1972)

Personal information
- Born: July 13, 1972 (age 54) San Rafael, CA
Medal record
Men's rowing
Representing United States
World Championships
Gold medal – first place	1999 St. Catharine's	Lwt men's eight
Gold medal – first place	2000 Zagreb	Lwt men's eight
Silver medal – second place	1998 Cologne	Lwt men's eight
Bronze medal – third place	2001 Lucerne	Lwt men's eight
Bronze medal – third place	2002 Seville	Lwt men's eight

John Cashman (born July 13, 1972, in San Rafael, California) is an American rower. He is currently founder and CEO of Digital Firefly Marketing.
