= Joe Reboledo =

Uruguayan rower

Personal information
- Born: 27 March 1983 (age 42); Montevideo, Uruguay

Sport
- Sport: Rowing

Joe Reboledo (born 27 March 1983) is a Uruguayan rower. He competed in the men's lightweight double sculls event at the 2004 Summer Olympics.
