= Amber Halliday =

Australian rower and cyclist

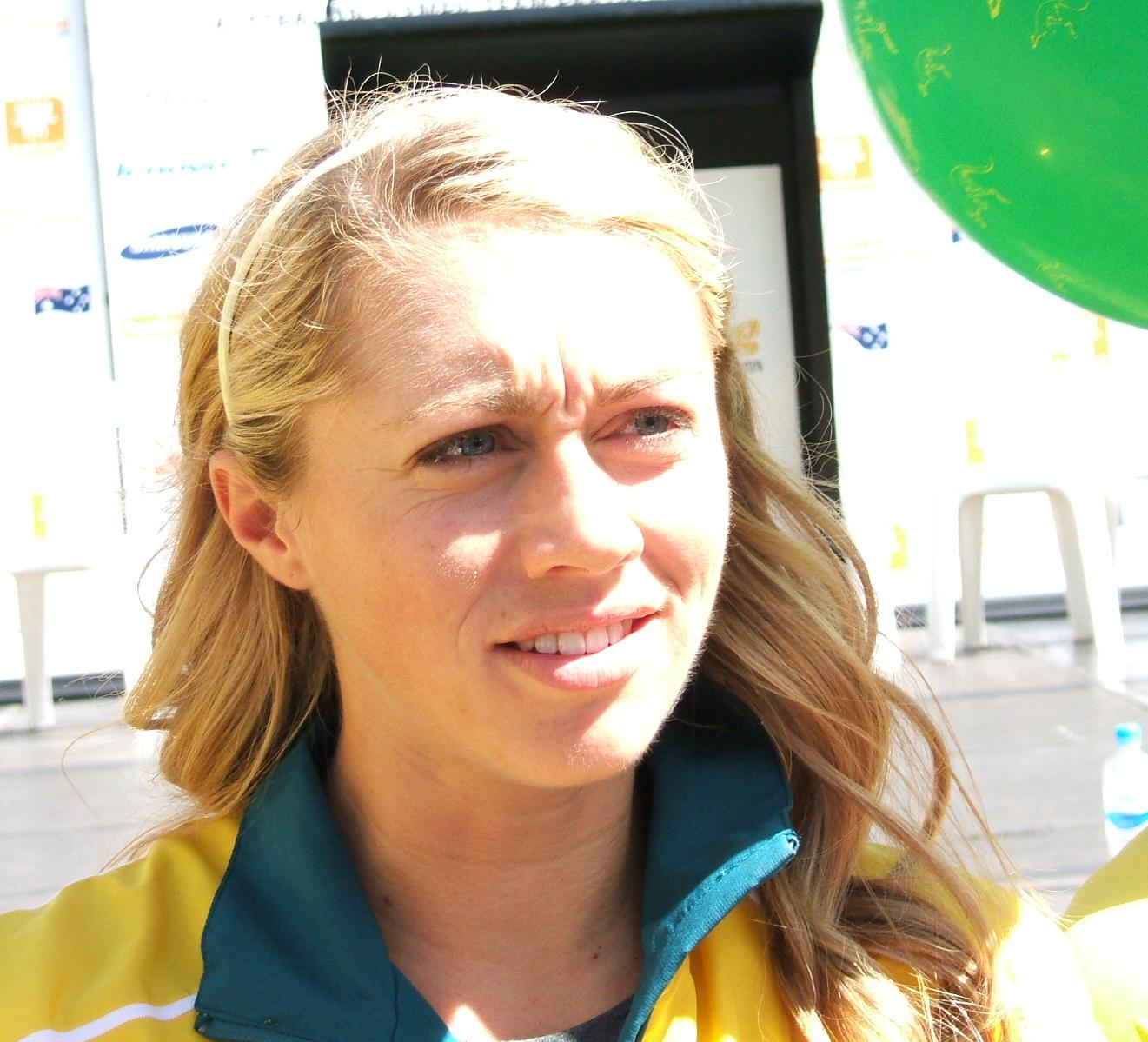
- Halliday in 2008

Personal information
- Full name: Amber Jae Halliday
- Born: 13 November 1979 (age 46)
- Years active: 2000–08

Sport
- Sport: Rowing
- Club: Adelaide University Boat Club
Medal record
Women's rowing
Representing Australia
World Rowing Championships
Gold medal – first place	2001	Lightweight quad-scull
Gold medal – first place	2002	Lightweight double-scull
Gold medal – first place	2007	Lightweight double-scull
Silver medal – second place	2000	Lightweight quad-scull
Silver medal – second place	2003	Lightweight double-scull
Silver medal – second place	2006	Lightweight double-scull

Amber Jae Halliday (born 13 November 1979) is a former rower and cyclist from Adelaide, South Australia. She is an Australian national champion, a dual Olympian and a three-time world-champion in lightweight rowing. She rowed for South Australia on nine occasions for six victories in Interstate Regattas and won numerous Australian titles at the Australian National Championships.

== Rowing career ==
A lightweight sculler, Halliday commenced her rowing at Pembroke School in Adelaide. Her senior club rowing was from the Adelaide University Boat Club.

Halliday raced in South Australian representative women's crews who contested the Victoria Cup at the Interstate Regatta. In 1998 that race was in lightweight coxless four and Halliday stroke the IV. From 1999 the lightweight women's interstate race was contested in quad sculls. Halliday raced for South Australia in quads successively from 1999 to 2004 and in 2006, 2007 and 2008. Those South Australian crews were victorious in 2000, 2002, 2003, 2004, 2007, 2008 and she was in the stroke seat for their convincing victories (margins in excess of 7 seconds) of 2003, 2004, 2007

== International representative rowing career ==
=== World Championships ===
Halliday made her international representative debut for Australia in 1999, winning the u/23 World Championship in Hamburg in the lightweight double scull with Hannah Every.

Halliday made her first Australian senior representative appearance at the 2000 World Rowing Cup III in Lucerne, Switzerland. The next month that same crew contested the lightweight quad scull at the 2000 World Rowing Championships in Zagreb, and Halliday won a silver medal crewed with Sally Causby, Eliza Blair and Catriona Roach The following year at Lucerne 2001 that crew with Blair changed out for Josephine Lips won the gold medal, the lightweight quad scull world championship title and set two world records in the process.

In 2002 Halliday was teamed with Causby in a double scull, and won her second World Championship title at Seville 2002. They stayed together for Milan 2003 and won the silver medal in the double scull.

At the 2006 World Rowing Championships in Eton, Dorney in the lightweight double-scull with Marguerite Houston, Halliday won the silver medal. The following year at Munich 2007 and still together in the double, Halliday and Houston won the gold and Amber's third world championship.

=== Olympics ===
Halliday was selected for and competed at the 2004 Olympic Games with double sculls partner Sally Newmarch. They set a world-best time in their heat but placed fourth in the final.

She was named South Australia's Sports Star of 2007 and then pre-selected with Marguerite Houston for the 2008 Beijing Olympics in a double-scull. They placed eighth in a "disappointing" performance.

== Cycling ==
In late 2008 Halliday swapped her sculling shell for a bicycle, training with the South Australian Sports Institute squad. While riding for MB Cycles, Halliday won her first ever cycle tour, the NZCT Women's Tour of New Zealand in February 2009. She was named as the 2009 Amy Gillett Foundation Scholarship winner.

On 17 January 2011 Amber was hospitalised after a racing accident sustained at Victoria Park Racecourse, Adelaide. In September 2011 her recovery was documented by the Australian Broadcasting Corporation (ABC) program, Contact Sport.

== Cycling palmares ==
2009
4th National Time Trial Championships, AUS
1st Sprint Classification, National Road Race, AUS
1st Overall Women's Tour of New Zealand, NZL
6th Chongming Island Time Trial (1.1 UCI), CHN
2nd Women's Time Trial Honda Hybrid Tour (formerly Herald Sun Women's Tour), AUS
2nd Overall Honda Hybrid Tour (formerly Herald Sun Women's Tour), AUS
25th Giro Donne, ITA
1st Woman Annual Hell of the Marianas Century Cycle, FSM
2010
1st National Time Trial Champion Title
9th National Road Race

== See also ==
- Rowing at the 2004 Summer Olympics – Women's lightweight double sculls
