= Robert Sycz =

Polish rower

Personal information
- Born: 15 November 1973 (age 52) Warsaw, Poland
Medal record
Men's rowing
Representing Poland
Event	1st	2nd	3rd
Olympic Games	2	0	0
World Championships	2	3	1
European Championships	0	0	0
Total	4	3	1
Olympic Games
Gold medal – first place	2000 Sydney	LM2x
Gold medal – first place	2004 Athens	LM2x
World Rowing Championships
Gold medal – first place	1997 Aiguebelette	LM2x
Gold medal – first place	1998 Cologne	LM2x
Silver medal – second place	2001 Lucerne	LM2x
Silver medal – second place	2002 Seville	LM2x
Silver medal – second place	2003 Milan	LM2x
Bronze medal – third place	2005 Gifu	LM2x

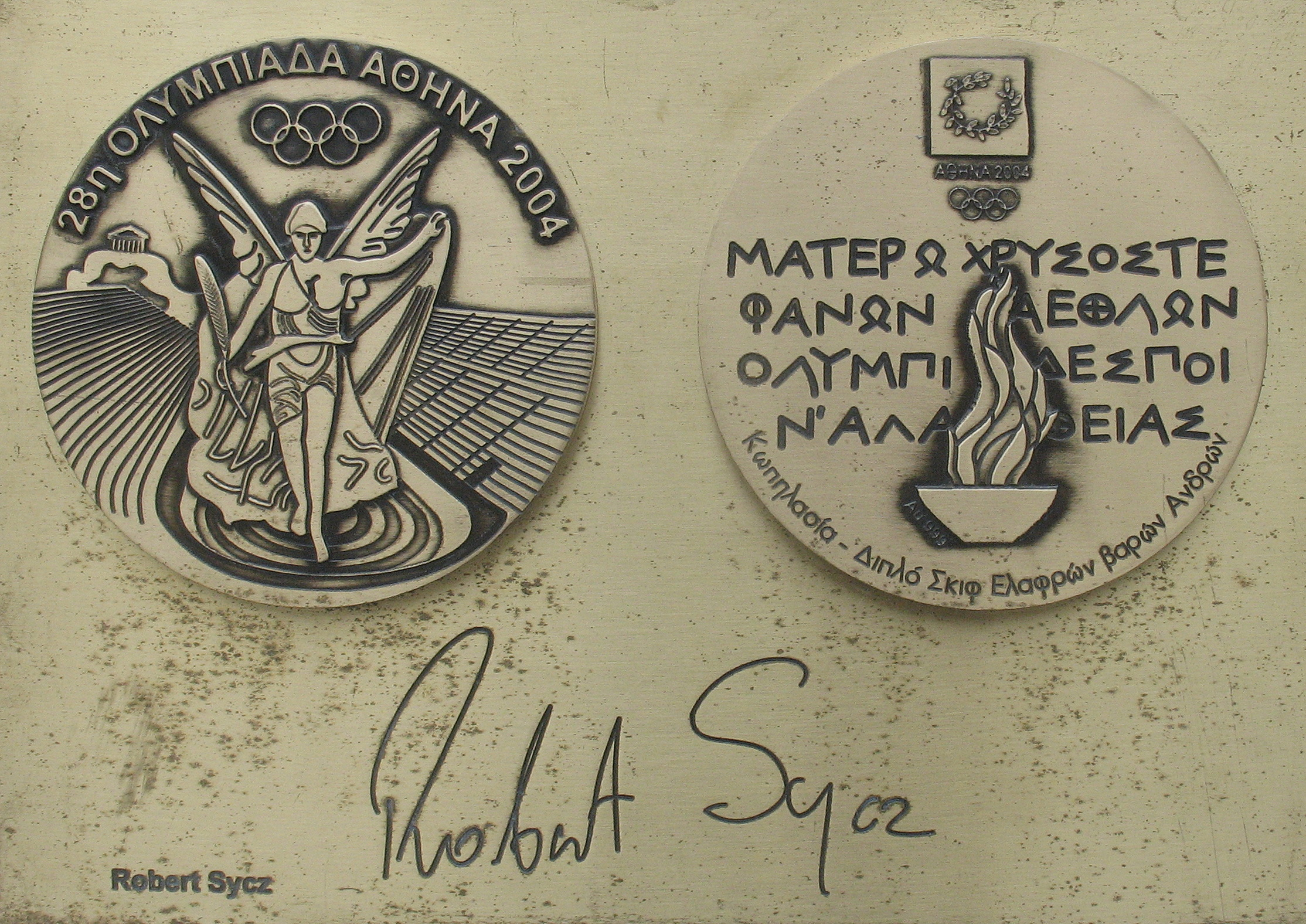
Copy of R. Sycz medal and autograph in Alei Gwiazd Sportu w Dziwnowie

Robert Sycz (born 15 November 1973 in Warsaw) is a Polish rower, and double Olympic Champion.

Sycz started his rowing career with SWOS 2 (Szkolny Wojewódzki Ośrodek Sportowy nr 2) in Warsaw. He currently competes for RTW Bydgostia in Bydgoszcz. Together with Tomasz Kucharski, Rober Sycz won two gold Olympic medals (in Sydney 2000 and in Athens 2004) in men's lightweight double sculls. This pair also won two gold medals (1997, 1998) and three silver medals (2001, 2002, 2003) at the World Rowing Championships.

For his sport achievements, he received the Order of Polonia Restituta:

- Knight's Cross (5th Class) in 2000
- Officer's Cross (4th Class) in 2004

Sycz was listed as the number two male rower of 2009 in the 2010 FOCUS issue of FISA's World Rowing Magazine. In 2012,

== Achievements ==
- Olympic Medals: 2 Gold
- World Championship Medals: 2 Gold, 3 Silver, 1 Bronze

=== Olympic Games ===
- 2004 – Gold, Lightweight Double Sculls (with Tomasz Kucharski)
- 2000 – Gold, Lightweight Double Sculls (with Tomasz Kucharski)
- 1996 – 7th, Lightweight Double Sculls (with Grzegorz Wdowiak)

=== World Rowing Championships ===
- 2009 – 4th, Lightweight Double Sculls (with Mariusz Stańczuk)
- 2006 – 5th, Lightweight Double Sculls (with Tomasz Kucharski)
- 2005 – Bronze, Lightweight Double Sculls (with Paweł Rańda)
- 2003 – Silver, Lightweight Double Sculls (with Tomasz Kucharski)
- 2002 – Silver, Lightweight Double Sculls (with Tomasz Kucharski)
- 2001 – Silver, Lightweight Double Sculls (with Tomasz Kucharski)
- 1998 – Gold, Lightweight Double Sculls (with Tomasz Kucharski)
- 1997 – Gold, Lightweight Double Sculls (with Tomasz Kucharski)
- 1995 – 5th, Lightweight Double Sculls (with Grzegorz Wdowiak)
- 1994 – 7th, Lightweight Double Sculls (with Grzegorz Wdowiak)
- 1993 – 6th, Lightweight Double Sculls (with Grzegorz Wdowiak)
