= Nikolaos Skiathitis =

Greek rower (born 1981)

Medal record

Men's rowing

Representing Greece

Olympic Games
Bronze medal – third place	2004 Athens	Lwt double scull

World Rowing Championships
Silver medal – second place	2001 Lucerne	Lwt quad scull

Mediterranean Games
Gold medal – first place	2005 Almería	Lwt double scull

Nikolaos "Nikos" Skiathitis (Greek: Νικόλαος Σκιαθίτης, born 11 September 1981 in Volos) is a Greek rower. He competed at for Greece at the 2004 Summer Olympics.
