= Yosvel Iglesias =

Cuban rower (born 1982)

Personal information
- Born: 31 January 1982 (age 44) Pinar del Río, Cuba

Sport
- Sport: Rowing
Medal record
Representing Cuba
Pan American Games
Gold medal – first place	2003 Santo Domingo	Lightweight quadruple sculls

Yosvel Iglesias Montano (born 31 January 1982) is a Cuban rower. He competed in the men's lightweight double sculls event at the 2004 Summer Olympics.
