= Andrew Black (rower) =

Australian rower

Personal information
- Born: 22 January 1971 (age 55)

Sport
- Country: Australia
- Sport: Rowing
- Club: UTS Haberfield Rowing Club; Harvard Sculling Club
Medal record
Men's rowing
Representing Australia
World Rowing Championships
Bronze medal – third place	2000 Zagreb	LM8-

Andrew Black (born 22 January 1971) is an Australian former representative lightweight rower. He won a bronze medal at the 2000 World Rowing Championships.

== Club and state rowing ==
Black's senior club rowing was initially from the Drummoyne Rowing Club then the UTS Haberfield Rowing Club in Sydney and later the Harvard Sculling Club in the USA.

In 1990 at the Australian Rowing Championships he contested the men's lightweight eight title in a composite Drummoyne/Sydney eight. In 2004 and 2005 he raced in UTS Haberfield colours contesting the Australian men's lightweight single sculls national titles.

He first made state selection for New South Wales in the bow seat of the 2000 lightweight contesting the Penrith Cup at the Interstate Regatta within the Australian Rowing Championships. He later rowed in New South Wales Penrith Cup fours in 2003 and 2004.

== International representative rowing ==
Black made his first Australian representative appearance in 2000 in the Australian lightweight men's eight. They rowed to first place at the World Rowing Cup III in Lucerne and then at the 2000 World Rowing Championships in Zagreb, they took the bronze medal. In the heat they finished second behind the eventual gold medallists USA and won the repechage by half a length. In the final the Australians finished third behind a comfortable USA followed by the British crew who had won their heat easily.

He remained in Australian selection contention in 2001 rowing a lightweight singles scull at the World Rowing Cup IV in Munich. Then for the 2001 World Rowing Championships in Lucerne he was back in the Australian lightweight eight which rowed to a sixth place finish.
