= Eliza Blair =

Australian rower

Personal information
- Born: 20 November 1976 (age 49)

Sport
- Sport: Rowing
- Club: Melbourne University Boat Club
Medal record
Women's rowing
Representing Australia
World Rowing Championships
Gold medal – first place	1997 Aiquebelette	LW2-
Silver medal – second place	2000 Zagreb	LW4x

Eliza Blair (born 20 November 1976) is an Australian architect and former representative rower. She was a national champion, a 1997 world champion and the standing world record holder in the women's lightweight coxless pair.

== Club and state rowing ==
Blair's senior rowing was done from the Melbourne University Boat Club.

Blair raced in Victorian representative women's crews who contested the Victoria Cup at the Interstate Regatta. Till 1998 that race was in lightweight coxless four and Blair raced in Victorian fours in 1996 and 1997 (to victory). From 1999 the lightweight women's interstate race was contested in quad sculls. Blair raced for Victoria in quads in 1999 (to victory) and in 2000.

== International representative rowing ==
Blair's first Australian representative appearance was in the 1995 u/23 Trans Tasman series where she raced in a lightweight pair. Her senior Australian representative debut was the following year in a lightweight coxless pair at the 1996 World Rowing Championships, a lightweight only regatta in Strathclyde, Scotland. She raced with her Victorian team-mate Justine Joyce to a fifth place. The following year at Aiguebelette 1997 still paired with Joyce, Blair won World Championship gold in a lightweight coxless pair.

As a result of the women's lightweight coxless pair being retired from international racing in 1997, Blair's 7:18:32 time set with Joyce is the standing world's best time in that event.

By 1998 Blair had switched to sculling and she competed at international World Rowing Cups that year in firstly a double scull and then the quad. For the 1998 World Rowing Championships in Cologne, Blair was selected in the lightweight quad scull with Josephine Lips, Rebecca Joyce and Dearne Grant. They placed fifth.

At the 2000 World Rowing Cup III in Lucerne, Switzerland Blair rowed in Australia's lightweight women's quad. The next month that same crew contested the lightweight quad scull at the 2000 World Rowing Championships in Zagreb, Croatia and Blair won a silver medal in a crew with Catriona Roach, Sally Causby and Amber Halliday. It was Blair's last international appearance for Australia
