= St Michael's Rowing Club =

Rowing club in Limerick, Ireland

- Location: O'Callaghan Strand, Limerick, Ireland
- Coordinates: 52.663158°N 8.6355897°W
- Home water: River Shannon
- Founded: 1901
- Affiliations: Rowing Ireland
- Website: www.smrc.ie

Events
- St Michael's Head of the river

Part of St Michael's Sporting Club which dates back to 1839,St Michael's Rowing Club is a rowing club located in Limerick, Ireland. It is affiliated to Rowing Ireland. In addition it has a satellite training facility in O'Briensbridge, County Clare. The club colours are royal blue and old gold.

== History ==
Founded in 1901, St Michael's Rowing Club started life in a small timber boathouse in the west end of the docks, close to the current dock gates. The first club Captain was the Nationalist MP for Limerick Michael Joyce. In the 1930s it was served with notice to quit as the land on which the boathouse stood was required for the dock expansion. After a period of inactivity and great uncertainty, a new boathouse was constructed at O'Callaghan Strand in 1940. Since then the club has grown and developed, and is currently one of the largest clubs affiliated to Rowing Ireland. In 2013 the club purchased a site in O'Briensbridge, County Clare adjacent to the Limerick Regatta field. This non-tidal facility can be used when weather conditions prohibit training on the lower Shannon. The club history was documented by Kieran Kerr in "Band of Gold" which was published in November 2016.

== National achievements ==
The club is the most successful club in the mid-west region having won 71 National Championships.

== International achievements ==
In excess of 300 green singlets have been won by club members. Sam Lynch was World Lightweight Single Sculls Champion in 2001 and 2002. Sinead Jennings won a silver medal in the women's Lightweight single sculls Championship in 2008. In 2025, Jack Rafferty rowing with Jonah Kirby of Kenmare Rowing club took a bronze medal in the under 19 double sculls at the European Championships. They later teamed up to take gold at the World Under 19 Championships.

== Olympians ==
The club has had members represent Ireland on four occasions - Sam Lynch (Atlanta & Athens), Sean O'Neill (Beijing). and Sinead Jennings (Rio)

== St Michael's Head of the River ==
St Michael's Head of the River race was first run in December 1981 with 34 crews. Since then it has grown to be the largest Head of the River event in the country, frequently attracting over 500 entries. Due to the difficulty in facilitating such large numbers in the reduced daylight in December, the Head was subsequently moved to February.
