= Daniel Măstăcan =

Romanian rower

Medal record

Men's rowing

Representing Romania

World Rowing Championships
Gold medal – first place	2001 Lucerne	M8+
Silver medal – second place	2000 Zagreb	M2+

Daniel Măstăcan (born 7 September 1980, in Bârlad) is a Romanian rower.
