= Wouter Van der Fraenen =

Belgian rower

Personal information
- Nationality: Belgian
- Born: 8 August 1980 (age 44); Bruges, Belgium

Sport
- Sport: Rowing

Wouter Van der Fraenen (born 8 July 1980) is a Belgian rower. He competed in the men's lightweight double sculls event at the 2004 Summer Olympics.
