= Alexey Salamini =

American rower

Sport
- Sport: Rowing
Medal record
Men's rowing
Representing United States
World Rowing Championships
| Gold medal – first place | 1999 St. Catharines | Lwt eight |

Alexey Salamini is an American coxswain. He won a gold medal at the 1999 World Rowing Championships in St. Catharines with the lightweight men's eight.

He is a 1995 graduate of St. Paul's School (New Hampshire).
