= George Jelbart =

Australian rower

Personal information
- Nationality: Australian
- Born: 12 April 1982 (age 42); Melbourne, Australia

Sport
- Sport: Rowing

George Jelbart (born 12 April 1982) is an Australian rower. He competed in the men's lightweight double sculls event at the 2004 Summer Olympics.
