= Toby Garbett =

British rower (born 1976)

Medal record

Men's rowing

Representing Great Britain

World Rowing Championships
Gold medal – first place	2000 Zagreb	M4+
Gold medal – first place	2001 Lucerne	M4-
Silver medal – second place	2002 Seville	M4-
Silver medal – second place	2003 Milan	M4-

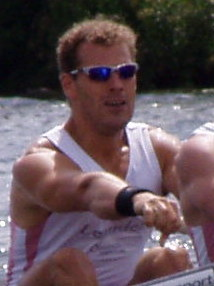
Toby Garbett (2004)

Toby Garbett (born 14 November 1976) is an English former rower who won two World Championship gold medals for Great Britain and competed in the men's coxless pair at the 2004 Summer Olympics.

== Early life and club rowing ==
Garbett was born in Chertsey, Surrey and rowed for Leander Club after leaving school. Standing 1.93 metres (6.3 ft), he progressed through the British junior and under-23 squads before joining the senior team in the late 1990s.

== Career ==
At the 2000 World Championships for non-Olympic events in Zagreb, Garbett rowed in the two seat of the British coxed four that led from the start to take gold, Great Britain’s first world title in the boat class.

The following year he, Steve Williams, Ed Coode and Rick Dunn won the men’s coxless four final at Lucerne in 5:48.98, succeeding the celebrated Redgrave crew as world champions.

Garbett remained in the flagship four as it won consecutive silver medals at the 2002 World Championships in Seville and the 2003 regatta in Milan.

=== Olympic cycle (2004) ===
In February 2004 national coach Jürgen Gröbler reshuffled his crews, moving Matthew Pinsent and James Cracknell into the four and instructing Garbett and Dunn to form a new coxless pair. A month later Garbett and Dunn’s runners-up finish at the Hazewinkel trials made them favourites for Olympic selection in the pair, but back pain briefly threatened Garbett’s place during the final build-up.

At the 2004 Summer Olympics in Athens the pair placed fourth in a fiercely contested semi-final dubbed “the semi from hell” and went on to win the B-final for seventh overall.

== Later career ==
Garbett continued to vie for national selection and in July 2008 successfully appealed his omission from the Beijing squad, forcing a late re-trial in Austria. Although narrowly outside the qualifying standard in a 2 km time-trial, the bid ultimately fell short and he retired from international rowing later that year.

== Coaching and business ==
After elite rowing Garbett qualified as a Pilates instructor and British Triathlon Level 2 coach, winning age-group national titles before opening TG Gym & Wellness in Henley-on-Thames in 2022. The centre also serves as the strength-and-conditioning hub for Leander Club’s athletes.

== Achievements ==
=== Olympic Games ===
- 2004 – 7th, Coxless pair (with Rick Dunn)

=== World championships ===
- 2003 – Silver, Coxless four (with Steve Williams, Josh West, Rick Dunn)
- 2002 – Silver, Coxless four (with Steve Williams, Josh West, Rick Dunn)
- 2001 – Gold, Coxless four (with Steve Williams, Ed Coode, Rick Dunn)
- 2000 – Gold, Coxed four (with Steve Williams, Ed Coode, Rick Dunn, Alistair Potts)
