= Justin Gevaert =

Belgian rower

Personal information
- Nationality: Belgian
- Born: 19 May 1980 (age 44); Bruges, Belgium

Sport
- Sport: Rowing

Justin Gevaert (born 19 May 1980) is a Belgian rower. He competed in the men's lightweight double sculls event at the 2004 Summer Olympics.
