= Eric Den Besten =

American lightweight rower

Personal information
- Born: April 10, 1975 (age 51)

Sport
- Sport: Rowing
Medal record
Men's rowing
Representing United States
World Rowing Championships
Gold medal – first place	1999 St. Catharines	Lwt eight

Eric Den Besten (born April 10, 1975) is an American lightweight rower. He won a gold medal at the 1999 World Rowing Championships in St. Catharines with the lightweight men's eight.
