= Michal Vabroušek =

Czech rower (born 1975)

Medal record

Men's rowing

Representing Czech Republic

World Rowing Championships
Gold medal – first place	2000 Zagreb	LM1x
Silver medal – second place	1998 Cologne	LM1x
Silver medal – second place	1999 St. Catharines	LM1x
Bronze medal – third place	2001 Lucerne	LM1x

Michal Vabroušek (born 21 May 1975 in Prague) is a Czech rower.

Vabrousek started his international career rowing for Czechoslovakia at the 1992 World Rowing Junior Championships in Montreal, Canada. He competed at the 1996 and 2004 Olympics.
