= Josephine Lips =

Australian rower (born 1976)

Personal information
- Nickname: Lucky
- Born: 8 July 1976 (age 49)

Sport
- Sport: Rowing
- Club: Torrens Rowing Club
Medal record
Women's rowing
Representing Australia
World Rowing Championships
Gold medal – first place	2001 Lucerne	LW4X

Josephine Lips (born 8 July 1976) is an Australian former representative rower. She was a national champion and 2001 World champion.

== Club and state rowing ==
A South Australian, Lip's senior rowing was done from Adelaide's Torrens Rowing Club.

Lips raced in South Australian representative women's crews who contested the Victoria Cup at the Interstate Regatta. Until 1998 that race was in lightweight coxless four shells and Lips raced in South Australian fours in 1995, 1997 and 1998. From 1999 the lightweight women's interstate race was contested in quad sculls. Lips raced for Victoria in quads in 1999 and 2001.

In Torrens colours Lips contested the 2001 lightweight quad sculls national title at the Australian Rowing Championships in a composite South Australian crew. She won that Australian title.

== International representative rowing ==
Lips made her Australian representative debut at the 1995 Nations Cup in Groningen, Holland – the equivalent of today's World Rowing U23 Championships. She made three appearances for Australia at Nations Cup championships all in lightweight double sculls. She placed fifth at Groningen in 1995, fourth at Hazewinkel in 1996 and third at Milan in 1997.

She made her first Australian representative appearance in the lightweight quad who placed fifth at the 1998 World Rowing Championships in Cologne, Germany.

It would take three years before Lips made it back to an Australian crew at a World Championship but her timing was right in being picked for Lucerne 2001. She replaced Eliza Blair in the experienced quad who'd taken silver in 2000. With Catriona Roach and Lips' South Australian teammates Sally Causby and Amber Halliday, Lips rowed to gold and a World Championship title at Lucerne. That crew set two world records in the process.
