= Glen Loftus =

Australian rower

Personal information
- Born: 8 June 1976 (age 50) Perth, Western Australia
- Years active: 1990–2004

Sport
- Country: Australia
- Sport: Rowing
- Club: Curtin University Rowing Club
Medal record
Men's rowing
Representing Australia
Olympic Games
Silver medal – second place	2004 Athens	Coxless four
World Rowing Championships
Bronze medal – third place	2000 Zagreb	LM8+
Under 23 World Rowing Championships
Gold medal – first place	1996 Hazewinkel	LM4-
Silver medal – second place	1997 Milan	LM2x

Glen Loftus (born 8 June 1976 in Perth, Western Australia) is an Australian former lightweight rower. He was a national champion, an U23 world champion and an Olympic silver medalist. In competitive retirement he was a coach and a rowing administrator in Western Australia.

== Club and state career ==
Loftus was educated at Wesley College, Perth where he took up rowing in 1990. His senior club rowing was from the Curtin University Rowing Club from 1994 until his retirement in 2004. He won eight West Australian state titles in sculls and sweep-oared boats and was acknowledged as Western Australian Oarsman of the Year in 1998 and 2001.

In 1995, 1997 and from 1999 to 2004 Loftus was selected to represent Western Australia in the men's lightweight four contesting the Penrith Cup at the Interstate Regatta within the Australian Rowing Championships. He stroked those West Australian fours from 1999 to 2004, including the victorious crew of 2002.

In Curtin University colours he contested national championship titles at the Australian Rowing Championships on numerous occasions. He won the 1999 lightweight double-scull national title and in 2001 and 2002 he won the lightweight coxless pair national championship.

== International representative rowing ==
Loftus made his Australian representative debut with his West Australian team-mate Tom Atkinson in the U23 lightweight coxless four who won gold at the 1996 World Rowing U23 Championships in Hazewinkel, Belgium. The following year at the 1997 U23 World Championships in Milan, Loftus rowed to a silver medal in the lightweight double scull with Karl Parker from New South Wales.

In 2000 Loftus made his first representative appearance in the senior Australian lightweight squad, competing at the World Rowing Cup III in the lightweight eight. Then at the 2000 World Rowing Championships in Zagreb he stroked the Australian lightweight eight to a bronze medal. The following year Loftus held his leadership role as stroke of both the men's lightweight eight and the coxless four. He competed in the four at World Rowing Cup IV that year in Munich, and for the 2001 World Championships in Lucerne he stroked the Australian coxless four to a ninth placing and the eight who finished sixth overall.

In 2002 in a crew with the veteran Tasmanian lightweight Simon Burgess, Loftus stroked the coxless four at a World Rowing Cup in Munich and at the 2002 World Rowing Championships in Seville to a fourth placing. In 2003 Loftus kept his seat in the lightweight coxless four for the World Rowing Cup III in Lucerne, where the Australian finished in sixth place. For the 2003 World Rowing Championships in Milan, Loftus moved into the twoo seat and Tim O'Callaghan stroked the four. They missed the A final, winning the B final for an overall seventh placing.

For the Athens Olympics 2004 Loftus was in the bow seat of Australian lightweight coxless four. He raced with Ben Cureton his longstanding West Australian partner with whom he'd won national titles and competed at World Championships, along with Simon Burgess and Anthony Edwards who were both making their third Olympic appearances. They qualified through to the final where the Danish favourites got away in the 1st 500m. Burgess at stroke brought the Australian four back into contention in the second and third 500 metres. However the Danes still had something in reserve in the rush home extending their lead to 1.4 seconds at the finish. Loftus and the Australians won the Olympic silver.

== Coaching and administration ==
Following retirement from competitive rowing, Loftus joined Fremantle Rowing Club as Senior Coach from 2006 through until 2011. During this time he was recognised by Rowing WA as Western Australia's 2010 Club Coach of the Year.

In October 2012 Loftus was appointed to the board of Rowing WA. He was responsible for the advancement of High Performance rowing in Western Australia from 2012 to 2016.

== Achievements ==
- 8 x Western Australian Senior State titles (Including M2-, M2x, M4-, M4x, M8+)
- 4 x U23 Australian National Titles (1996 U23LM2-, U23LM4-, 1997 U23M1x, U23LM2x)
- 2 x World Rowing U23 Championships medals (Gold – Hazewinkel 1996, Silver – Milan 1997)
- 3 x Australian National Senior Titles (LM2x 1999, LM2- 2001, 2002)
- 1 x World Rowing Championship medal (Bronze, Zagreb 2000)
- 1 x Penrith Cup (Interstate Champions at the Australian Rowing Championships) (2002)
- 1 x Olympic Silver Medal (LM4- Athens 2004)
- Western Australian Oarsman of the Year 1998, 2001
- Western Australian Club Coach of the Year 2010
