= Janet Radünzel =

German rower

Medal record

Women's rowing

Representing Germany

World Rowing Championships
Gold medal – first place	2001 Lucerne	LW2x
Silver medal – second place	2002 Seville	LW2x
Bronze medal – third place	1995 Tampere	LW4-
Bronze medal – third place	2000 Zagreb	LW2-
Bronze medal – third place	2003 Milan	LW1x

Janet Radünzel (born 7 May 1973 in Rendsburg) is a former German rower. She represented Germany at international competitions.

At the 1995 World Rowing Championships, she won the bronze medal in the LW4- event, together with Jutta Schausten, Gunda Reimers and Gaby Schulz.
