= Simone Forlani =

Italian lightweight rower

Personal information
- Born: 1 August 1974 (age 51)

Sport
- Sport: Rowing
Medal record
Men's rowing
Representing Italy
World Rowing Championships
Gold medal – first place	1999 St. Catharines	Lwt quad scull
Silver medal – second place	2000 Zagreb	Lwt quad scull

Simone Forlani (born 1 August 1974) is an Italian lightweight rower. He won a gold medal at the 1999 World Rowing Championships in St. Catharines with the lightweight men's quadruple scull.
