= Matthew Russell (rower) =

Australian rower

Sport
- Country: Australia
- Sport: Rowing
- Club: Wendouree Ballarat Rowing Club

Achievements and titles
- National finals: Penrith Cup 1996-2002
Medal record
Men's rowing
Representing Australia
World Rowing Championships
Bronze medal – third place	2000 Zagreb	LM8-

Matthew Russell (born 1 October 1972) is an Australian former representative lightweight rower. He was a two time Australian national champion, and won a bronze medal at the 2000 World Rowing Championships.

== Club and state rowing ==
Raised in Ballarat, Victoria Russell was educated at Ballarat Clarendon College where he took up rowing. His senior club rowing was from the Wendouree Ballarat Rowing Club where he was a committee man from 1992 to 1997. In the 2002 season he rowed from the Huon Rowing Club in Tasmania.

Rusell first rowed at the Interstate Regatta within the Australian Rowing Championships in 1996 in a Victorian lightweight four which contested and won the Penrith Cup. He rowed in further lightweight fours for Victoria in 1997, 2000 and 2002.

In 1997 in an all-Ballarat crew he won the national lightweight coxless four title at the Australian Rowing Championships.

== International representative rowing ==
Russell made his first Australian representative appearance in 1994 in a lightweight four which competed at the 1994 Nations Cup. That same year he was selected in an Australian lightweight four which contested an U23 Trans-Tasman series against New Zealand crews.

He made his Australian senior representative debut in 1999 in a lightweight pair at the World Rowing Cup II in Vienna. . The next year he gained a seat in the Australian lightweight men's eight. They rowed to first place at the World Rowing Cup III in Lucerne and then at the 2000 World Rowing Championships in Zagreb, they took the bronze medal. In the heat they finished second behind the eventual gold medallists USA and won the repechage by half a length. In the final the Australians finished third behind a comfortable USA followed by the British crew who had won their heat easily.

By 2002 Russell had relocated to Tasmania to further his representative aspirations. He came back into Australian contention in a lightweight pair with Tasmanian Shane Broad. They competed at the World Rowing Cup III in Munich finishing fifth and then at the 2002 World Rowing Championships in Seville where they finished in overall ninth place. It was Russell's last Australian representative appearance.
