= Martin Schwartz (rower) =

American lightweight rower

Personal information
- Born: February 27, 1971 (age 55)

Sport
- Sport: Rowing
Medal record
Men's rowing
Representing United States
World Rowing Championships
Gold medal – first place	2000 Zagreb	Lwt eight
Silver medal – second place	1998 Cologne	Lwt eight

Martin Schwartz (born February 27, 1971) is an American lightweight rower. He won a gold medal at the 2000 World Rowing Championships in Zagreb with the lightweight men's eight.
