= Tomasz Kucharski =

Polish rower (born 1974)

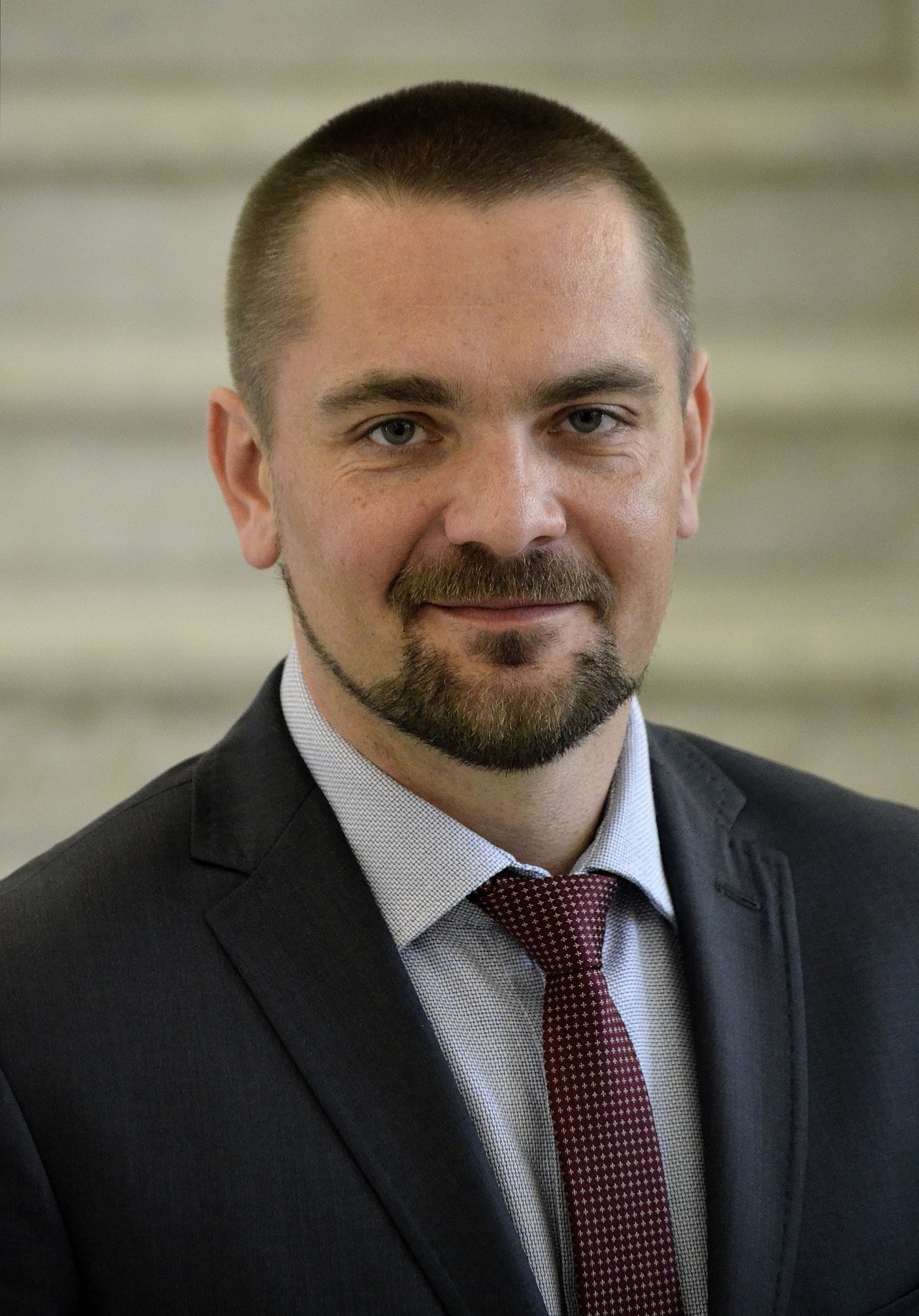

Medal record

Men's rowing

Representing Poland
Event	1st	2nd	3rd
Olympic Games	2	0	0
World Championships	2	3	0
European Championships	0	0	0
Total	4	3	0

Olympic Games
Gold medal – first place	2000 Sydney	LM2x
Gold medal – first place	2004 Athens	LM2x

World Championships
Gold medal – first place	1997 Aiguebelette	LM2x
Gold medal – first place	1998 Cologne	LM2x
Silver medal – second place	2001 Lucerne	LM2x
Silver medal – second place	2002 Seville	LM2x
Silver medal – second place	2003 Milan	LM2x

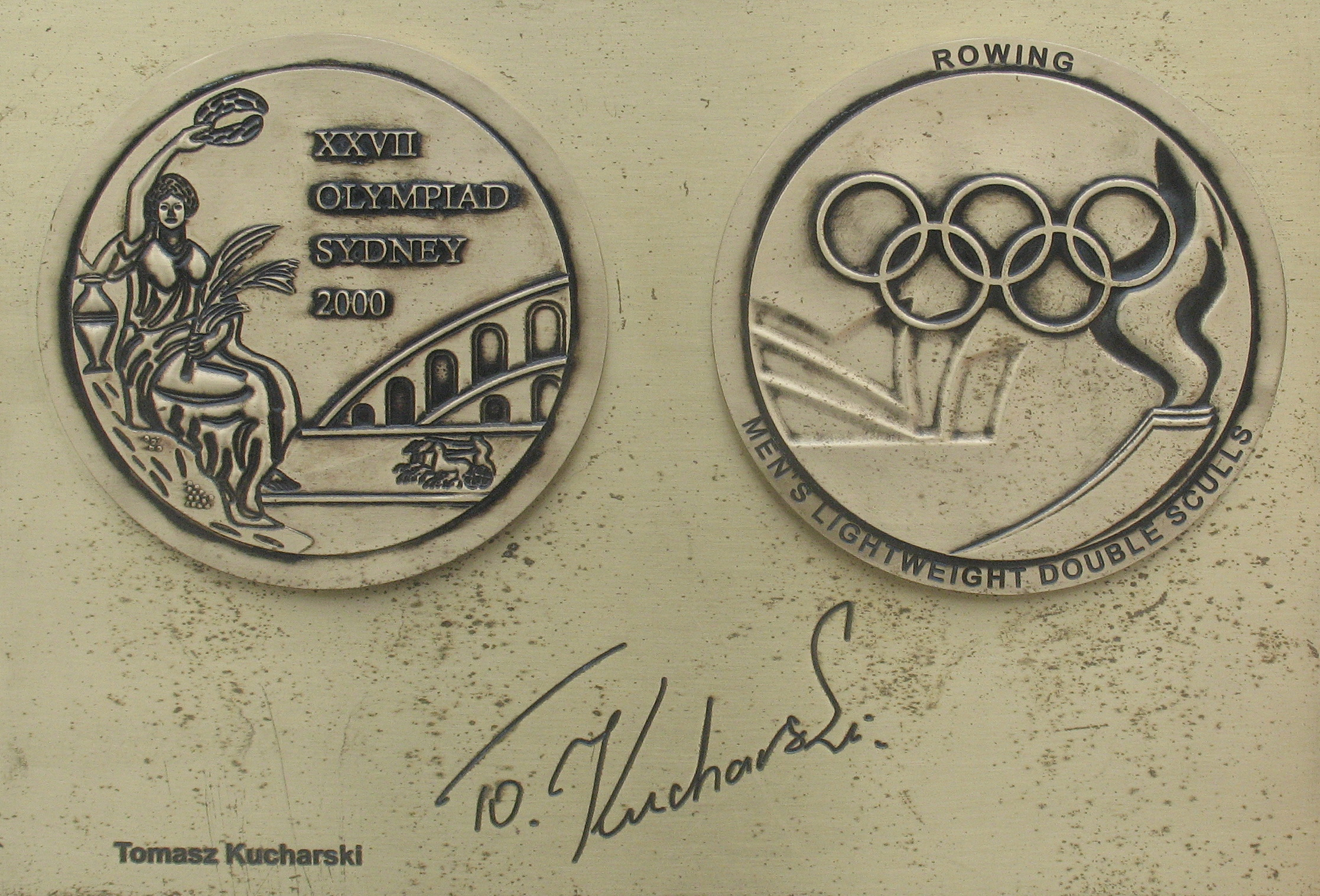
Copy of T. Kucharski medal and autograph in Alei Gwiazd Sportu w Dziwnowie

Tomasz Bogusław Kucharski (born 16 February 1974, in Gorzów Wielkopolski) is a Polish competition rower and Olympic champion. As of 2015, he serves in the Polish Sejm.

Together with Robert Sycz, Kucharski won two gold medals in lightweight double sculls, at the 2000 Summer Olympics and at the 2004 Summer Olympics.

For his sport achievements, he received the Order of Polonia Restituta:

- Knight's Cross (5th Class) in 2000
- Officer's Cross (4th Class) in 2004
