= Angus Maclaurin =

American rower

Personal information
- Born: June 26, 1978 (age 48)

Sport
- Sport: Rowing
Medal record
Men's rowing
Representing United States
World Rowing Championships
Gold medal – first place	2000 Zagreb	Lwt eight
Silver medal – second place	2003 Milan	Lwt eight

Angus Maclaurin (born June 26, 1978) is an American lightweight rower. He won a gold medal at the 2000 World Rowing Championships in Zagreb with the lightweight men's eight.
