= Kenneth Chan (rower) =

Australian rowing cox

Kenny Chan
Personal information
- Born: 10 January 1974 (age 52)

Sport
- Country: Australia
- Sport: Rowing

Achievements and titles
- World finals: Zagreb 2000
- National finals: King's Cup 1995-2001
Medal record
Men's rowing
Representing Australia
World Rowing Championships
Bronze medal – third place	2000 Zagreb	LM8+

Kenneth Chan (born 10 Jan 1974) is an Australian representative rowing coxswain. He was an Australian champion and won a bronze medal at the 2000 World Rowing Championships.

== Club and state rowing ==
Raised in Perth, Chan was educated at Trinity College, Perth where he took up coxing.

Chan was the prominent state representative coxswain for Western Australian for a number of years from 1995. He coxed West Australian men's eights contesting the King's Cup at the Interstate Regatta within the Australian Rowing Championships every year from 1995 to 2001. He steered the 1999 WA eight to a King's Cup victory.

== International representative rowing ==
Chan made his Australian representative debut in 2000 in the stern of the lightweight eight which contested and won gold at that year's World Rowing Cup III in Lucerne. At that year's 2000 World Rowing Championships in Zagreb - a lightweight only regatta being an Olympic year - Chan steered the Australian lightweight eight. In the heat they finished second behind the eventual gold medallists USA and won the repechage by half a length. In the final the Australians took the bronze behind a comfortable USA and then the British crew who had won their heat easily.
