= Felix Erdmann =

German rower

Medal record

Men's rowing

Representing Germany

World Rowing Championships
Silver medal – second place	1999 St. Catharines	M2+
Silver medal – second place	2006 Eton	LM8+
Silver medal – second place	2007 Munich	LM8+

Felix Erdmann (born 4 April 1978 in Mülheim) is a German rowing cox.
