= Sally Causby =

Australian rower

Personal information
- Born: 26 November 1977 (age 48) Gawler, South Australia
- Years active: 2000–03

Sport
- Sport: Rowing
- Club: Adelaide Rowing Club
Medal record
Women's rowing
Representing Australia
World Rowing Championships
Gold medal – first place	2001 Lucerne	LW4x
Gold medal – first place	2002 Seville	LW2x
Silver medal – second place	2000 Zagreb	LW4x
Silver medal – second place	2003 Milan	LW2x

Sally Causby (born 26 November 1977) is an Australian former rower – a national champion and two-time world champion.

== Club and state rowing ==
A South Australian, Causby's senior rowing was done with the Adelaide Rowing Club.

Causby contested the Australian national lightweight quad sculls championship in composite crews and wearing her Adelaide colours four times for four victories in 2001, 2002, 2003 and 2004.

Causby raced in South Australian representative women's lightweight quad sculls who contested the Victoria Cup at the Interstate Regatta in 2001, 2002 (to victory as stroke), 2003 (to a convincing 7 second victory).

== International representative rowing ==
Causby made her first Australian senior representative appearance at the 2000 World Rowing Cup III in Lucerne, Switzerland. The next month that same crew contested the lightweight quad scull at the 2000 World Rowing Championships in Zagreb, Croatia and Causby won a silver medal crewed with Amber Halliday, Eliza Blair and Catriona Roach. The following year at Lucerne 2001 that crew with Blair changed out for Josephine Lips won the gold medal and the lightweight quad scull world championship title. They set two world records in the process.

In 2002 teamed with Halliday in a double scull, Causby won her second World Championship title at Seville 2002. They stayed together for Milan 2003 and won the silver medal in the double scull. In 2004, she injured an intervertebral disc and was forced to take the year off, thus missing the Olympic selection regatta.
