= José Sobral Júnior =

Brazilian rower

Personal information
- Born: 9 March 1979 (age 47) Rio de Janeiro, Brazil

Sport
- Sport: Rowing
Medal record
Representing Brazil
Pan American Games
Silver medal – second place	2003 Santo Domingo	Lightweight double sculls

José Sobral Júnior (born 9 March 1979) is a Brazilian rower. He competed in the men's lightweight double sculls event at the 2004 Summer Olympics.
