= Mauro Baccelli =

Italian rower (1980–2008)

Personal information
- Born: 19 May 1980
- Died: 27 April 2008 (aged 27) Sarzana, Italy

Sport
- Sport: Rowing
Medal record
Men's rowing
Representing Italy
World Rowing Championships
Gold medal – first place	1999 St. Catharines	Lwt quad scull
Gold medal – first place	2001 Lucerne	Lwt quad scull
Silver medal – second place	2000 Zagreb	Lwt quad scull

Mauro Baccelli (19 May 1980 – 27 April 2008) was an Italian lightweight rower. He won a gold medal at the 1999 World Rowing Championships in St. Catharines with the lightweight men's quadruple scull. Baccelli died in a car crash on the Autostrada A12 near Sarzana.
