= Greg Ruckman =

American rower

Personal information
- Full name: Gregory Michael Ruckman
- Born: December 30, 1973 (age 52) Cincinnati, Ohio, United States

Sport
- Country: United States
- Sport: Rowing
Medal record
Men's rowing
Representing United States
World Rowing Championships
| Gold medal – first place | 1999 St. Catharines | Lwt eight |

Gregory Michael Ruckman (born December 30, 1973) is an American rower. He competed at the 2000 Summer Olympics and 2004 Summer Olympics in Athens, where he placed 7th in the men's lightweight double sculls, along with Steve Tucker. Ruckman was born in Cincinnati, Ohio, where he became and Eagle Scout. He graduated from Harvard University.
