= Erik Miller (rower) =

American rower (born 1974)

Personal information
- Born: March 6, 1974 (age 52)

Sport
- Sport: Rowing
Medal record
Men's rowing
Representing United States
World Championships
Gold medal – first place	2000 Zagreb	Lwt eight
Bronze medal – third place	2001 Lucerne	Lwt eight
Bronze medal – third place	2002 Seville	Lwt eight

Erik Miller (born March 6, 1974) is an American lightweight rower. He won a gold medal at the 2000 World Rowing Championships in Zagreb with the lightweight men's eight.
