= Angelika Brand =

German rower

Medal record

Women's rowing

Representing Germany

World Rowing Championships
Gold medal – first place	1997 Aiguebelette	LW2x
Silver medal – second place	1999 St. Catharines	LW4x
Silver medal – second place	2000 Zagreb	LW1x

Angelika Brand (born 13 February 1976) is a German rower.
