= Rick Dunn =

British rower (born 1976)

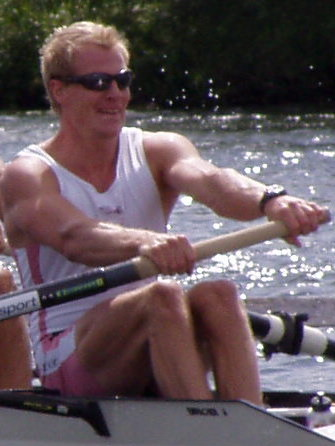

Personal information
- Born: Richard Dunn; 8 March 1976 (age 50) Cambridge, England

Sport
- Sport: Rowing
Medal record
Men's rowing
Representing Great Britain
World Rowing Championships
| Gold medal – first place | 2000 Zagreb | Coxed four |
| Gold medal – first place | 2001 Lucerne | Coxless Four |
| Silver medal – second place | 1999 St. Catharines | Coxed four |
| Silver medal – second place | 2002 Seville | Coxless Four |
| Silver medal – second place | 2003 Milan | Coxless Four |

Richard Carl Edward Christy Dunn (born 8 March 1976) is a British rower. He won a gold medal at the 2001 World Rowing Championships in Lucerne with the men's coxless four. He represented Great Britain at the 2004 Summer Olympics in the coxless pair, where he came seventh with Toby Garbett.

== Early life and education ==
Richard Dunn was born on 8 March 1976 in Cambridge, England. He studied land economy at St Edmund's College, Cambridge, rowing for the Cambridge University Boat Club and ultimately stroking the Light Blues in the Boat Race of 2002.

== Career ==
=== University rowing ===
Dunn first attracted national notice in October 2001 when student newspaper Varsity reported that he had just returned from Lucerne as a freshly crowned world champion in the men’s coxless four.

=== International career ===
Dunn debuted for Great Britain at the 1999 World Championships, graduating to the senior coxless four in 2001. At the 2001 World Rowing Championships in Lucerne he, Toby Garbett, Steve Williams and Ed Coode won gold in 5 min 48.98 s, ahead of Germany and Slovenia. Dunn stayed in the four for the 2002 campaign and retained his seat when the crew took silver at the World Championships in Seville, finishing behind Canada.

A second consecutive silver followed at the 2003 regatta in Milan.

==== Olympic cycle and pair selection (2004) ====
In early 2004 national coach Jürgen Grobler reshuffled the flagship coxless four, dropping Dunn and Garbett so that Matthew Pinsent and James Cracknell could switch in. Dunn spoke publicly of his “heartache” at the decision and vowed to prove himself in a new coxless pair with Garbett. The pair qualified for the 2004 Summer Olympics in Athens, where they reached the semifinal and raced the B-final.

== Achievements ==
=== Olympic Games ===
- 2004 – 7th, Coxless pair (with Toby Garbett)

=== World championships ===
- 1999 – Silver, Coxed four (with Graham Smith, Jonathan Searle, Jonny Singfield, Alistair Potts (cox))
- 2000 – Gold, Coxed four (with Steve Williams, Toby Garbett, Graham Smith, Alistair Potts (cox), Rick Dunn)
- 2001 – Gold, Coxless four (with Steve Williams, Ed Coode, Toby Garbett)
- 2002 – Silver, Coxless four (with Steve Williams, Josh West, Toby Garbett)
- 2003 – Silver, Coxless four (with Steve Williams, Josh West, Toby Garbett)
