= Sinéad Lynch =

Irish rower (born 1976)

Medal record

Women's rowing

Representing Ireland

World Rowing Championships
Gold medal – first place	2001 Lucerne	LW1x
Silver medal – second place	2008 Linz	LW1x
Bronze medal – third place	2000 Zagreb	LW1x

Sinéad Lynch (born 30 September 1976; née Jennings; in Letterkenny, County Donegal) is an Irish rower. She is a member of St Michael's Rowing Club. In August 2015 she was a member of the lightweight women's double scull which qualified the boat for the Rio Olympics. Lynch and her rowing partner Claire Lambe reached the finals at the Women's lightweight double sculls, but did not win a medal.

== Personal life ==
The daughter of Garda Michael Jennings (a native of the West of Ireland) and his wife Theresa, Sinéad was raised at Hawthorn Heights in Letterkenny. Her sister is Caitriona Jennings. She studied Pharmacy at University of Sunderland and later competed Medical studies at Trinity College Dublin. Jennings is married to Sam Lynch, who rowed for Ireland at the 1996 and 2004 Olympics.
