= Andrew Butler (rower) =

Australian rower

Personal information
- Born: 25 October 1973 (age 52)

Sport
- Country: Australia
- Sport: Rowing
- Club: Huon Rowing Club; Ulverstone Rowing Club

Achievements and titles
- National finals: Penrith Cup
Medal record
Men's rowing
Representing Australia
World Rowing Championships
Bronze medal – third place	2000 Zagreb	LM8-
World Rowing U23 Championships
Silver medal – second place	1995 Groningen	LM4-

Andrew Butler (born 25 October 1973) is an Australian former representative lightweight rower. He was a two time Australian national champion, and won a bronze medal at the 2000 World Rowing Championships.

== Club and state rowing ==
Born in Tasmania, Butler's senior club rowing was from the Huon Rowing Club and later the Ulverstone Rowing Club in Hobart.

Butler first rowed at the Interstate Regatta within the Australian Rowing Championships in 1995 in a Tasmanian lightweight four which contested the Penrith Cup. He rowed in further lightweight fours for Tasmania in 1997, 1998, 1999, 2000 and 2001. Those crews were victorious from 1999 to 2001 and Butler stroked the 2001 crew.

== International representative rowing ==
Butler made his first Australian representative appearance in 1995 in a lightweight four which competed at the 1995 and took the silver medal at the Nations Cup in Groningen.

He made his Australian senior representative debut in 1999 in a lightweight pair which finished second at the World Rowing Cup II in Vienna. He didn't make selection for the World Championships that year but in 2000 secured a seat in the Australian men's lightweight eight. He rowed in that crew at the World Rowing Cup III in Lucerne to a gold medal.

The next year he gained a seat in the Australian lightweight men's eight. They rowed to first place at the World Rowing Cup III in Lucerne and then at the 2000 World Rowing Championships in Zagreb, they took the bronze medal. In the heat they finished second behind the eventual gold medallists USA and won the repechage by half a length. In the final the Australians finished third behind a comfortable USA followed by the British crew who had won their heat easily.

He remained in Australian selection contention in 2001 rowing in the lightweight coxless four at the World Rowing Cup IV in Munich. Then at the 2001 World Rowing Championships in Lucerne he rowed in both the lightweight coxless four (to ninth place) and the men's lightweight eight (to sixth place).
