= Frédéric Dufour =

French rower

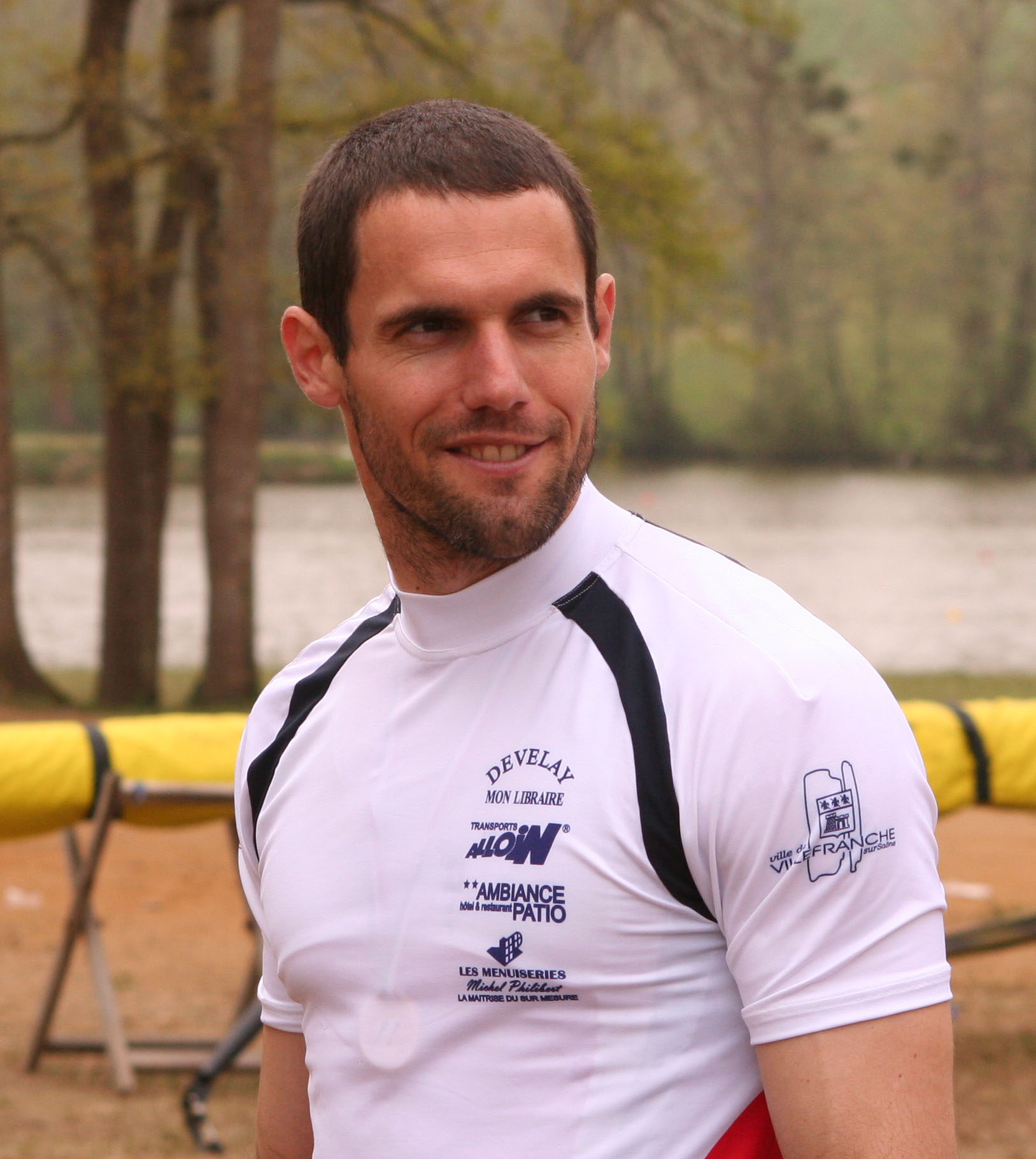

Medal record

Men's rowing

Representing France

Olympic Games
| Silver medal – second place | 2004 Athens | Lwt double sculls |

World Championships
| Silver medal – second place | 2009 Poznań | Lwt double scull |
| Silver medal – second place | 2010 Karapiro | Lwt quad scull |
| Bronze medal – third place | 1996 Strathclyde | Lwt quad scull |
| Bronze medal – third place | 2006 Eton | Lwt double scull |

Mediterranean Games
| Silver medal – second place | 2005 Almería | Lwt double scull |

Frédéric Dufour (born 2 February 1976 in Lyon) is a French rower.
