= Ed Coode =

British Olympic rower (born 1975)

Ed Coode MBE
Personal information
- Nationality: British
- Born: Edward Robert Coode; 19 June 1975 (age 51) Indian Queens, Cornwall, England
- Height: 193 cm (6 ft 4 in)
- Weight: 96 kg (212 lb)

Sport
- Country: United Kingdom
- Sport: Men's rowing
- Event: Coxless four
- College team: Oxford University Boat Club
- Club: Leander Club; Imperial College Boat Club
- Retired: 2004
Medal record
Men's rowing
Representing Great Britain
Olympic Games
| Gold medal – first place | 2004 Athens | Coxless four |
World Rowing Championships
| Gold medal – first place | 1999 St. Catharines | Coxless four |
| Gold medal – first place | 2001 Lucerne | Coxless four |
| Bronze medal – third place | 1997 Aiguebelette | Coxed four |
| Bronze medal – third place | 2003 Milan | Eight |

Edward R. Coode, MBE (born 19 June 1975) is an English rower, twice World Champion and Olympic Gold medalist.

== Early life ==
Born in Indian Queens, Cornwall in 1975, Coode boarded at Papplewick School and Eton College. He studied marine biology at University of Newcastle upon Tyne and Keble College, Oxford, and rowed in the Oxford crew at the 1998 Boat Race.

== Career ==
Coode won his first World Championship in 1999, as a substitute in the British men's coxless four, rowing with Steve Redgrave, Matthew Pinsent and James Cracknell. When Tim Foster returned to the four, Coode was put into the coxless pair with Greg Searle. They finished fourth at the 2000 Sydney Olympics having led for most of the race and being overtaken by three crews in the last 600 m, finishing 12/100th of a second (about 2 feet) out of third place.

In 2001, he won a second World Championship in the men's coxless four with Steve Williams, Rick Dunn and Toby Garbett. In 2002, he missed the World Championships due to injury, Josh West taking his place in the coxless four, and was in the men's eight in 2003 that won the bronze at that year's world championships.

With the injury to Alex Partridge, Coode was moved from the eight to the coxless four for the 2004 Summer Olympics in Athens, rowing with Pinsent, Cracknell and Williams. In a close race with World champions Canada, they won gold.

== Retirement ==
In October 2004, Coode announced he was retiring from rowing – taking a year out to travel in South America and then study for a law degree at University of the West of England in Bristol. Following two years at university he spent two years as a trainee solicitor at Bristol firm Burges Salmon and returned to Cornwall, where his family has had business interests and owned land since the 19th century. He joined the family-founded law firm Coodes Solicitors and left in 2022 to run the estate management business. In 2025 he was appointed chair of the Country Land and Business Association Cornwall branch.

== Personal life ==
Coode was appointed Member of the Order of the British Empire (MBE) in the 2005 New Year Honours for services to sport.

On 17 September 2005 Coode married Clare Smales in the St Mary's and St Julian's Church, Maker, Cornwall. They have four children.

== Achievements ==
- Olympic Medals: 1 Gold
- World Championship Medals: 2 Gold, 2 Bronze
- Junior World Championship Medals: 1 Silver
- Oxford University Blue Boat (lost)

=== Olympic Games ===
- 2004 – Gold, Coxless four (with James Cracknell, Steve Williams, Matthew Pinsent)
- 2000 – 4th, Coxless pair (with Greg Searle)

=== World championships ===
- 2003 – Bronze, Eight
- 2001 – Gold, Coxless four (with Steve Williams, Rick Dunn, Toby Garbett)
- 1999 – Gold, Coxless four (with Steve Redgrave, Matthew Pinsent, James Cracknell)
- 1998 – 7th, Eight
- 1997 – Bronze, Coxed four

=== Junior World championships ===
- 1993 – Silver, Coxless four
