= 1999 World Rowing Championships =

International rowing event

- Venue: Royal Canadian Henley Rowing Course
- Location: St. Catharines, Ontario, Canada
- Dates: 22 to 29 August

The 1999 World Rowing Championships were World Rowing Championships that were held from 22 to 29 August 1999 at the Royal Canadian Henley Rowing Course in St. Catharines, Ontario, Canada.

== Medal summary ==
=== Men's events ===
Event:	Gold	Time	Silver	Time	Bronze	Time
M1x	New Zealand; Rob Waddell	6:36.68	Switzerland; Xeno Müller	6:40.96	Canada; Derek Porter	6:43.99
M2x	Slovenia; Iztok Čop (b); Luka Špik (s)	6:04.37	Germany; Sebastian Mayer (b); Stefan Roehnert (s)	6:06.15	Norway; Fredrik Bekken (b); Olaf Tufte (s)	6:06.20
M4x	Germany; Marco Geisler (b); Andreas Hajek (2); Stephan Volkert (3); André Willms (s)	6:24.37	Ukraine; Oleh Lykov (b); Oleksandr Marchenko (2); Leonid Shaposhnikov (3); Oleksandr Zaskalko (s)	6:27.39	Australia; Jason Day (b); Duncan Free (2); Peter Hardcastle (3); Stuart Reside (s)	6:28.20
M2+	United States; James Neil (b); Phil Henry (s); Nicholas Anderson (c)	6:48.56	Germany; Jörg Dießner (b); Enrico Schnabel (s); Felix Erdmann (c)	6:48.81	Argentina; Damian Ordás (b); Walter Balunek (s); Patricio Mouche (c)	6:56.07
M2−	Australia; Drew Ginn (b); James Tomkins (s)	6:19.00	France; Michel Andrieux (b); Jean-Christophe Rolland (s)	6:22.21	Croatia; Oliver Martinov (b); Ninoslav Saraga (s)	6:24.86
M4+	United States; Tom Murray (b); Daniel Protz (2); Garrett Klugh (3); Jake Wetzel (s); Sean Mulligan (c)	6:38.31	Great Britain; Rick Dunn (b); Jonny Searle (2); Jonny Singfield (3); Graham Smith (s); Alistair Potts (c)	6:40.18	Romania; Ovidiu Cornea (b); Vasile Măstăcan (2); Valentin Robu (3); Nicolae Țaga (s); Dumitru Răducanu (c)	6:41.89
M4−	Great Britain; James Cracknell (b); Steve Redgrave (2); Ed Coode (3); Matthew Pinsent (s)	5:48.57	Australia; Ben Dodwell (b); Bo Hanson (2); Geoff Stewart (3); James Stewart (s)	5:50.11	Italy; Lorenzo Carboncini (b); Riccardo Dei Rossi (2); Valter Molea (3); Carlo Mornati (s)	5:51.41
M8+	United States; Bryan Volpenhein (b); Robert Kaehler (2); Porter Collins (3); Tom Welsh (4); Michael Wherley (5); Jeffrey Klepacki (6); Garrett Miller (7); Chris Ahrens (s); Peter Cipollone (c)	6:01.58	Great Britain; Bob Thatcher (b); Ben Hunt-Davis (2); Fred Scarlett (3); Louis Attrill (4); Luka Grubor (5); Kieran West (6); Tim Foster (7); Steve Trapmore (s); Rowley Douglas (c)	6:03.27	Russia; Sergey Matveyev (b); Aleksandr Litvinchev (2); Dmitri Kovalev (3); Vladimir Volodenkov (4); Andrey Glukhov (5); Dimitri Axenov (6); Nikolay Aksyonov (6); Pavel Melnikov (7); Dmitry Rozinkevich (s); Aleksandr Lukyanov (c)	6:04.64
Men's lightweight events
LM1x	Denmark; Karsten Nielsen	6:47.97	Czech Republic; Michal Vabroušek	6:51.14	Hungary; Gergely Kokas	6:53.14
LM2x	Italy; Michelangelo Crispi (b); Leonardo Pettinari (s)	7:12.46	Australia; Bruce Hick (b); Haimish Karrasch (s)	7:15.95	Germany; Ingo Euler (b); Bernhard Rühling (s)	7:18.80
LM4x	Italy; Simone Forlani (b); Daniele Gilardoni (2); Franco Sancassani (3); Mauro Baccelli (s)	6:27.71	Germany; Manuel Brehmer (b); Franz Mayer (2); Dennis Niemeyer (3); Thorsten Schmidt (s)	6:32.41	Ireland; Neal Byrne (b); James Lindsay-Fynn (2); Noel Monahan (3); Gearoid Towey (s)	6:32.81
LM2−	Italy; Stefano Basalini (b); Paolo Pittino (s)	7:28.35	Chile; Miguel Cerda (b); Christián Yantani (s)	7:29.05	Ireland; Neville Maxwell (b); Tony O'Connor (s)	7:29.18
LM4−	Denmark; Eskild Ebbesen (b); Thomas Ebert (2); Victor Feddersen (3); Thomas Poulsen (s)	6:45.63	Australia; Darren Balmforth (b); Simon Burgess (2); Anthony Edwards (3); Bob Richards (s)	6:47.15	France; Jean-David Bernard (b); Xavier Dorfman (2); Yves Hocdé (3); Laurent Porchier (s)	6:47.35
LM8+	United States; William Plifka (b); Chris Kerber (2); John Cashman (3); Eric Den Besten (4); Kevin Cotter (5); Greg Ruckman (6); Nicholas Tripician (7); Sean Kammann (s); Alexey Salamini (c)	5:34.43	Great Britain; Phil Baker (b); Gareth Davis (2); Aiden Tucker (3); Mike Louzado (4); James McGarva (5); Ned Kittoe (6); Nick Strange (7); Ben Webb (s); Christian Cormack (c)	5:36.08	Italy; Lorenzo Bertini (b); Filippo Dodero (2); Stefano Fraquelli (3); Carlo Grande (4); Andrea Lupini (5); Salvatore Messina (6); Marco Paniccia (7); Bruno Pasqualini (s); Antonio Cirillo (c)	5:36.93

=== Women's events ===
Event:	Gold:	Time	Silver:	Time	Bronze:	Time
W1x	Belarus; Ekaterina Karsten	7:11.68	Germany; Katrin Rutschow	7:14.70	Bulgaria; Rumyana Neykova	7:17.02
W2x	Germany; Kathrin Boron (b); Jana Thieme	6:41.98	China; Liu Lin (b); Zhang Xiuyun (s)	6:45.99	Netherlands; Pieta van Dishoeck (b); Eeke van Nes (s)	6:46.18
W4x	Germany; Maren Derlien (b); Meike Evers (2); Kerstin Kowalski (3); Manuela Lutze (s)	7:06.53	Ukraine; Yana Kramarenko (b); Svitlana Maziy (2); Tetiana Ustiuzhanina (3); Olena Morozova-Ronzhina (s)	7:09.98	Russia; Oxana Dorodnova (b); Yuliya Levina (2); Larisa Merk (3); Olga Samulenkova (s)	7:11.64
W2−	Canada; Theresa Luke (b); Emma Robinson (s)	7:00.85	Germany; Elke Hipler (b); Kathleen Naser (s)	7:02.77	Australia; Kate Slatter (b); Rachael Taylor (s)	7:03.83
W4−	Belarus; Yuliya Bichyk (b); Yelena Mikulich (2); Olga Tratsevskaya (3); Marina Znak (s)	6:26.25	Germany; Sandra Goldbach (b); Marita Scholz (2); Mira Van Daelen (3); Sonja Van Daelen (s)	6:28.29	United States; Sara Field (b); Tristine Glick (2); Wendy Wilbur (3); Maite Urtasun (s)	6:31.15
W8+	Romania; Georgeta Damian (b); Maria Magdalena Dumitrache (2); Doina Ignat (3); Ioana Olteanu (4); Marioara Popescu (5); Doina Spîrcu (6); Viorica Susanu (7); Aurica Bărăscu (s); Elena Georgescu (c)	6:47.66	United States; Torrey Folk (b); Amy Fuller (2); Sarah Jones (3); Katherine Maloney (4); Amy Marie Martin (5); Elizabeth McCagg (6); Linda Miller (7); Monica Tranel-Michini (s); Rajanya Shah (c)	6:48.81	Canada; Buffy-Lynne Williams (b); Laryssa Biesenthal (2); Alison Korn (3); Theresa Luke (4); Heather McDermid (5); Emma Robinson (6); Dorota Urbaniak (7); Kubet Weston (s); Lesley Thompson-Willie (c)	6:53.19
Women's lightweight events
LW1x	Switzerland; Pia Vogel	7:33.80	United States; Lisa Schlenker	7:34.99	Argentina; Maria Garisoain	7:35.81
LW2x	Romania; Constanța Burcică (b); Camelia Macoviciuc (s)	8:12.67	United States; Christine Smith-Collins (b); Sarah Garner (s)	8:16.30	Australia; Virginia Lee (b); Sally Newmarch (s)	8:19.88
LW4x	United States; Molly Brock (b); Mary Angie Cummins (2); Sara Den Besten (3); Sherri Kiklas (s)	7:17.82	Germany; Angelika Brand (b); Maja Tarmstadt (2); Anna Kleinz (3); Christine Morawitz (s)	7:20.19	Canada; Nathalie Benzing (b); Tracy Duncan (2); Katrina Scott (3); Renata Troc (s)	7:33.57
LW2−	United States; Linda Muri (b); Rachel Anderson (s)	8:31.11	Great Britain; Jane Hall (b); Milindi Myers (s)	8:31.72	Zimbabwe; Nicola Davies(b); Jill Lancaster (s)	9:00.98

== Medal table ==
Place	Nation	1st place, gold medalist(s)	2nd place, silver medalist(s)	3rd place, bronze medalist(s)	Total
1	United States	6	3	1	10
2	Germany	3	7	1	11
3	Italy	3	0	2	5
4	Romania	2	0	1	3
5	Belarus	2	0	0	2
5	Denmark	2	0	0	2
7	Australia	1	3	3	7
8	Great Britain	1	4	0	5
9	Switzerland	1	1	0	2
10	Canada	1	0	3	4
11	New Zealand	1	0	0	1
11	Slovenia	1	0	0	1
13	Ukraine	0	2	0	2
14	France	0	1	1	2
15	Chile	0	1	0	1
15	China	0	1	0	1
15	Czech Republic	0	1	0	1
18	Ireland	0	0	2	2
18	Russia	0	0	2	2
18	Argentina	0	0	2	2
21	Bulgaria	0	0	1	1
21	Croatia	0	0	1	1
21	Hungary	0	0	1	1
21	Netherlands	0	0	1	1
21	Norway	0	0	1	1
21	Zimbabwe	0	0	1	1
Total		24	24	24	72
