= Tamás Varga (rower) =

Hungarian rower

Medal record

Men's rowing

Representing Hungary

World Rowing Championships
Gold medal – first place	2005 Gifu	LM2x

European Rowing Championships
Gold medal – first place	2007 Poznań	LM2x

Tamas Varga (born 17 June 1978, in Budapest) is a Hungarian rower who won the men's lightweight sculls pair event at the 2005 World Rowing Championships with Zsolt Hirling. He has also competed at three Olympics (2004, 2008 and 2012) also in the men's lightweight sculls event.
