= Wendy Tripician =

American rower

Personal information
- Born: Wendy Campanella; July 19, 1974 (age 51)
- Height: 175 cm (5 ft 9 in)
- Weight: 59 kg (130 lb)
- Spouse: Nicholas Tripician

Sport
- Sport: Rowing
Medal record
Women's rowing
Representing United States
World Rowing Championships
Bronze medal – third place	2002 Seville	Lwt quad scull
Bronze medal – third place	2008 Ottensheim	Lwt quad scull

Wendy Tripician (née Campanella, born July 19, 1974) is an American lightweight rower.

Campanella was born in 1974 in Needham, a suburb of Boston. She received her education at Simmons College, from where she graduated in 1996 with an under-graduate degree, and in 2002 with a graduate degree in health studies.

She competed, under her maiden name, at the 2002 World Rowing Championships in Seville, Spain with the lightweight squad scull and won bronze. In 2002, Nicholas Tripician was also part of the US National Team, and they would later marry.

At the 2008 World Rowing Championships in Linz, Austria, she won a bronze medal with the lightweight squad scull.
