= Václav Maleček =

Czech rower

Personal information
- Born: 21 April 1974 (age 51); Prague, the Czech Republic
- Height: 186 cm (6 ft 1 in)
- Weight: 73 kg (161 lb)

Sport
- Sport: Rowing

Václav Maleček (born 21 April 1974) is a Czech rower. He competed at the 2004 Summer Olympics in Athens with the men's lightweight double sculls where they came ninth.
