= Zsolt Hirling =

Hungarian rower

Medal record

Men's rowing

Representing Hungary

World Rowing Championships
Gold medal – first place	2005 Gifu	LM2x

European Rowing Championships
Gold medal – first place	2007 Poznań	LM2x
Bronze medal – third place	2008 Athens	LM2x

Zsolt Hirling (born 28 May 1984 in Budapest) is a Hungarian rower.

With Tamas Varga, he won the 2005 World Championships men's lightweight double sculls. At European level, he won the 2007 European Rowing Championships, again with Tamas Varga, and a bronze medal in the same event with the same partner in 2008. At Olympics level, he has appeared at three Olympics, 2004, 2008 and 2012, all in the men's lightweight double sculls and all with Tamas Varga, finishing in 5th, 14th and 11th respectively.
