= Nicholas Tripician =

American rower

Personal information
- Born: January 19, 1978 (age 48)
- Spouse: Wendy Tripician

Sport
- Sport: Rowing
Medal record
Men's rowing
Representing United States
World Rowing Championships
Gold medal – first place	1999 St. Catharines	Lwt eight

Nicholas Tripician (born January 19, 1978) is an American lightweight rower. He won a gold medal at the 1999 World Rowing Championships in St. Catharines with the lightweight men's eight.
