= Zhu Zhifu =

Chinese rower

Personal information
- Nationality: Chinese
- Born: 29 January 1979 (age 47) Yugan, China

Sport
- Sport: Rowing

Zhu Zhifu (born 29 January 1979) is a Chinese rower. He competed in the men's lightweight double sculls event at the 2004 Summer Olympics.
