= Manuel Brehmer =

German rower

Medal record

Men's rowing

Representing Germany

World Rowing Championships
Silver medal – second place	1999 St. Catharines	LM4x

Manuel Brehmer (born 1 June 1978 in West Berlin, West Germany) is a German rower.
