= Sam Lynch =

Irish rower (born 1975)

Medal record

Men's rowing

Representing Ireland

World Rowing Championships
Gold medal – first place	2001 Lucerne	LM1x
Gold medal – first place	2002 Seville	LM1x
Silver medal – second place	2000 Zagreb	LM1x
Bronze medal – third place	2003 Milan	LM2x

Sam Lynch (born 29 November 1975 in Limerick) is an Irish rower from St Michael's Rowing Club. He was a member of the Irish rowing team at the 1996 and 2004 Olympics.

Lynch is a doctor. His wife Sinead Jennings is also a doctor and a rower, who qualified for the 2016 Olympics. They have four children.
