= Ľuboš Podstupka =

Slovak rower

Personal information
- Nationality: Slovak
- Born: 25 September 1972 (age 54) Bratislava, Slovak Republic

Sport
- Sport: Rowing

Ľuboš Podstupka (born 25 September 1972) is a Slovak rower. He competed in the men's lightweight double sculls event at the 2004 Summer Olympics.
