= Edward Winchester =

Canadian rower (1970–2020)

Personal information
- Born: Edward Vincent Winchester; December 16, 1970 Saint John, New Brunswick
- Died: April 22, 2020 (aged 49) Hanover, New Hampshire

Sport
- Sport: Rowing
Medal record
Men's rowing
Representing Canada
World Rowing Championships
Gold medal – first place	2000 Zagreb	Lwt coxless pair
Bronze medal – third place	1996 Motherwell	Lwt eight
Bronze medal – third place	1997 Aiguebelette	Lwt eight

Edward Vincent Winchester (December 16, 1970 – April 22, 2020) was a Canadian lightweight rower. He won a gold medal at the 2000 World Rowing Championships in Zagreb with Ben Storey in the lightweight men's coxless pair.

On April 22, 2020, Winchester died at the age of 49 years old after suffering a heart attack while training on a rowing machine in his basement.
