= Lo Ting Wai =

Hong Kong rower (born 1985)

Personal information
- Nationality: Hong Kong
- Born: 18 October 1985 (age 39); Hong Kong

Sport
- Sport: Rowing

Lo Ting Wai (born 18 October 1985) is a Hong Kong rower. He competed in the men's lightweight double sculls event at the 2004 Summer Olympics.
