= Joshua Fien-Helfman =

American rower

Sport
- Sport: Rowing
Medal record
Men's rowing
Representing United States
World Rowing Championships
Gold medal – first place	2000 Zagreb	Lwt eight

Joshua Fien-Helfman is an American coxswain. He won a gold medal at the 2000 World Rowing Championships in Zagreb with the lightweight men's eight.
