= Alistair Potts =

British rower

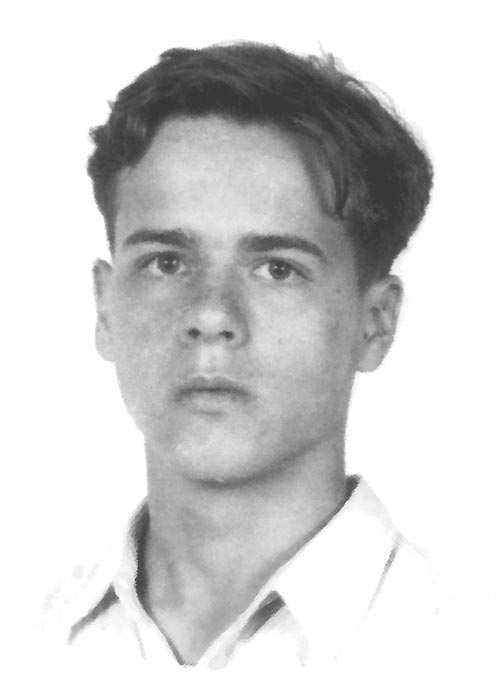
- Alistair Potts in 1990

Sport
- Sport: Rowing
Medal record
Men's rowing
Representing Great Britain
World Rowing Championships
Gold medal – first place	2000 Zagreb	Coxed four
Silver medal – second place	1999 St.Catherine's	Coxed four
Henley Royal Regatta
Winner	1996 Ladies' Plate	Eight
Winner	2000 Prince Philip Cup	Coxed four
University Boat Race
Winner	1995 Cambridge Women	Eight
Winner	1996 Goldie	Eight
Winner	1998 Cambridge Men	Eight

Alistair James Potts (born 7 July 1971) is a former British World Champion cox.

Potts was born in Chertsey, Surrey. He was educated at Winchester College and the University of Edinburgh, where he studied architectural history. He coxed the men's four, men's lightweight eight and women's eight at the 1994 Commonwealth Regatta representing Scotland. After going up to Trinity Hall, Cambridge, at the end of 1994, he was winning coxswain in the record-breaking CUWBC crew at the 1995 Women's Boat Race. This was quickly followed by coxing Trinity Hall BC to the headship in the May Bumps. In 1996 Potts was selected for Goldie, which beat Isis by 11 lengths in a then record time. That year, he also won the Ladies' Challenge Plate at Henley Royal Regatta with CUBC (rowing as Goldie Boat Club). In 1998 he steered the record-breaking Cambridge Blue Boat in the Boat Race.

Potts won a silver medal at the 1999 World Championships at St. Catharines, Canada in the coxed four with Jonny Searle, Jonny Singfield, Rick Dunn and Graham Smith. Gold came in 2000 at Zagreb in the same boat class with Dunn, Smith and Toby Garbett and Steve Williams. This was the first time Great Britain had won the coxed four at the World Rowing Championships since its inception. That same crew also won the Prince Philip Challenge Cup at Henley.

Potts' rowing career finished in 2000 coinciding with the completion of his doctoral thesis on "The Development of the Playhouse in Seventeenth-Century London". Potts is now a writer and broadcaster, and had a brief acting part in the Australian soap opera Neighbours in 2004. He and his wife Emily are directors of Party Ark, an internet-based children's party supplies business and administer the Titulus Regius website on the history of Richard III. Since 2013 he has been a director of New York–based solar finance company Open Energy Group.

== Achievements ==
- World Rowing Championships Medals: 1 Gold, 1 Silver (Great Britain)
- Henley Royal Regatta Medals: 2 Gold (Goldie BC and Leander Club)
- Blue Boat / Women's Blue Boat Wins: 2 (Cambridge University)

=== World championships ===
- 2000 – Gold, Coxed Four (with Steve Williams, Rick Dunn, Toby Garbett, Graham Smith)
- 1999 – Silver, Coxed Four (with Jonny Singfield, Jonny Searle, Rick Dunn, Graham Smith)

== See also ==
- List of Cambridge University Boat Race crews
