= The Boat Race 2023 =

Cambridge vs Oxford rowing race

- Date: 26 March 2023

Men's race
- Winner: Cambridge
- Margin of victory: 1 1/3 lengths
- Winning time: 18 minutes 18 seconds
- Overall record (Cambridge–Oxford): 86–81
- Umpire: Antony Reynolds

Women's race
- Winner: Cambridge
- Margin of victory: 4 1/2 lengths
- Winning time: 20 minutes 29 seconds
- Overall record (Cambridge–Oxford): 47–30
- Umpire: Matthew Smith

Reserves' races
- Men's winners: Goldie
- Women's winners: Blondie

The Boat Race 2023 was a side-by-side rowing race which took place on 26 March 2023. Held annually, The Boat Race is contested between crews from the universities of Oxford and Cambridge, usually along a 4.2-mile (6.8 km) tidal stretch of the River Thames, known as the Tideway, in south-west London. This was the 77th women's race and the 168th men's race. Cambridge led the longstanding rivalry 85–81 and 46–30 in the men's and women's races, respectively.

The crews for both men's and women's boats were announced on 6 March 2023. The women's race was umpired by Matthew Smith who rowed for Oxford University Boat Club in the Boat Race four times in the 2000s. The men's race was umpired by Antony Reynolds who rowed for Cambridge University Boat Club in 1984.

The women's race was won by Cambridge with a winning margin of four and a half lengths, which took the overall record in the women's race to 47–30 to Cambridge. Cambridge won the men's race an hour later by one and a third lengths, resulting in the head-to-head record being 86–81 to Cambridge. Cambridge's Goldie won the men's reserve race while Blondie secured victory for Cambridge in the women's reserve race. These contributed to a Cambridge clean sweep of all the 2023 Boat Races, including the openweight, lightweight and veteran races.

== Background ==
The Championship Course along which the races were conducted (historic names used)

The Boat Race is an annual side-by-side rowing competition between the University of Oxford (sometimes referred to as the "Dark Blues") and the University of Cambridge (sometimes referred to as the "Light Blues"). First held in 1829, the race usually takes place on the 4.2-mile (6.8 km) Championship Course, between Putney and Mortlake on the River Thames in south-west London. The rivalry is a major point of honour between the two universities; the race is followed throughout the United Kingdom and broadcast worldwide.

Taking place on 26 March 2023, it was the sixth time in the history of the Boat Race that men's and women's races were held on the same day and on the same course, this time along the Championship Course on the tidal stretch of the Thames, known as the Tideway. Before 2015, the women's race, which first took place in 1927, was usually held at the Henley Boat Races along the 2,000-metre (2,200 yd) course. However, on at least two occasions in the interwar period, the women competed on the Thames between Chiswick and Kew.

The women's race was umpired by Matthew Smith who rowed for Oxford University Boat Club (OUBC) in the Boat Race four times, in 2000, 2001, 2002 and 2003. The men's race was umpired by Antony Reynolds who rowed for Cambridge in the 1984 race, he was Goldie/Isis umpire in 2021 and Blondie/Osiris umpire in 2020 and 2022.

The autumn reception, at which the previous year's losing team challenges the winners to a rematch, was held on 30 November 2022. As Cambridge's women had won the previous year's race, it was Oxford's responsibility to offer the traditional challenge to Cambridge. To that end, Sara Helin, president of Oxford University Women's Boat Club (OUWBC), challenged Caoimhe Dempsey, her Cambridge counterpart. Oxford's victory in the men's race meant that Ollie Boyne, president of Cambridge University Boat Club (CUBC), offered a challenge to Tassilo von Mueller, president of OUBC.

== Coaches ==
Sean Bowden was the chief coach for OUBC, having been responsible for the men's crew since 1997, winning 13 from the previous 19 races. A former Great Britain Olympic coach, he led the Light Blues in the 1993 and 1994 Boat Races. Bowden's assistant coach was Brendan Gliddon, a South African who formerly coached under-23 and Fédération Internationale du Sport Universitaire (FISU) teams for both South Africa and Great Britain. The OUWBC chief coach was Andy Nelder, who previously worked with Bowden and OUBC for eleven years. He was assisted by James Powell.

The Cambridge men's crew coaching team was led by their chief coach, Rob Baker, who had previously coached Cambridge's women to victories in both the 2017 and 2018 races. Cambridge women's chief coach was Patrick Ryan who joined as CUBC's women's assistant coach in 2013. CUBC's assistant coaches included Bill Lucas, Autumn Mantell and Nick Acock, with Henry Fieldman as the coxing coach and Donald Legget, James Cracknell and Marko Banovic performing supporting roles.

== Crews ==
The crews for both men's and women's boats were announced on 6 March 2023, at Apothecaries' Hall, London.

=== Women ===
Women's crews
Seat	Oxford			Cambridge		
Seat	Name	Nationality	College	Name	Nationality	College
Bow	Laurel Kaye	American	Worcester	Carina Graf	German	Emmanuel
2	Ella Stadler	British/American	Exeter	Rosa Millard	British	Trinity Hall
3	Sara Helin (P)	British	St Peter's	Alex Riddell-Webster	British	Murray Edwards
4	Freya Willis	Australian	Magdalen	Jenna Armstrong	American	Jesus
5	Alison Carrington	British	Hertford	Freya Keto	American/British	St Edmund's
6	Claire Aitken	British	Oriel	Isabelle Bastian	American	Jesus
7	Sarah Marshall	British	Jesus	Clare Brillon	Canadian	Fitzwilliam
Stroke	Esther Austin	New Zealand	St Anne's	Caoimhe Dempsey (P)	Irish	Newnham
Cox	Tara Slade	British	St Peter's	James Trotman	British	Sidney Sussex
(P) – Boat club president

=== Men ===
Men's crews
Seat	Oxford			Cambridge		
Seat	Name	Nationality	College	Name	Nationality	College
Bow	James Forward	British	Pembroke	Matthew Edge	British	St Catharine's
2	Tom Sharrock	British	Magdalen	Nick Mayhew	British/New Zealand	Peterhouse
3	Freddy Orpin	British	St Catherine's	Noam Mouelle	French	Hughes Hall
4	Alex Bebb	Canadian	St Peter's	Brett Taylor	British/Taipei	Queens'
5	James Doran	British	Oriel	Thomas Lynch	Canadian/Irish	Hughes Hall
6	Jean-Philippe Dufour	Swiss/Canadian	Lincoln	Seb Benzecry	British	Jesus
7	Tassilo von Müller (P)	German	Hertford	Ollie Parish	British/Canadian	Peterhouse
Stroke	Felix Drinkall	British	Wolfson	Luca Ferraro	British	King's
Cox	Anna O'Hanlon	Australian	Somerville	Jasper Parish	British/Canadian	Clare
(P) – Boat club president: Ollie Boyne was the President of CUBC and raced in Goldie

== Races ==
The women's race was won by Cambridge with a winning margin of four and a half lengths, in a time of 20 minutes 29 seconds. Cambridge won the men's race an hour later by one and a third lengths, in a time of 18 minutes 18 seconds.

=== Reserves ===
CUBC's Blondie beat Oxford's Osiris in the 51st women's reserve boat race by three lengths, in a time of 21 minutes 20 seconds. In the 58th men's reserve race, CUBC's Goldie secured a one length victory over OUBC's Isis in a time of 18 minutes 23 seconds.

=== Lightweights ===
In the Lightweight Boat Races, raced on Monday 20th March, CUBC Women beat OUWLRC by 6 lengths in the 40th Lightweight Women's Boat Race. In the 49th Lightweight Boat Race, CUBC Men beat OULRC by 11 lengths.

Cambridge won all the University Boat Races; openweights, reserves and lightweights. This completed a 'Clean Sweep' only previously achieved in 1993 and 2018.
