= The Boat Race 2021 =

Cambridge University vs Oxford University rowing race

Coordinates: 52°24′34″N 00°18′01″E

- Date: 4 April 2021

Men's race
- Winner: Cambridge
- Margin of victory: Almost a length
- Winning time: 14:10
- Overall record (Cambridge–Oxford): 85–80
- Umpire: Sarah Winckless

Women's race
- Winner: Cambridge
- Margin of victory: Almost a length
- Winning time: 16:29
- Overall record (Cambridge–Oxford): 45–30
- Umpire: Judith Packer

Reserves' races
- Men's winners: Goldie
- Women's winners: Blondie

The Boat Race 2021 was an event comprising two side-by-side rowing races that took place on 4 April 2021. The Boat Race is contested annually between crews from the universities of Oxford and Cambridge. Usually held on the Championship Course in London, the 2021 race took place on the River Great Ouse near Ely, Cambridgeshire, between Queen Adelaide Bridge and Sandhill Bridge, Littleport. This was the 75th women's race and the 166th men's race; the 2020 race was cancelled as a result of the COVID-19 pandemic in the United Kingdom. Before the 2021 races, Cambridge led the longstanding rivalry 84–80 in the men's race and 44–30 in the women's.

The crews were announced on 25 March 2021. It was the first time in the history of the event that both the women's and men's races were officiated by female umpires, Judith Packer and Sarah Winckless respectively (They were the original umpires for the 2020 race). Cambridge's women's crew were considered strong favourites to win their race. Oxford's women's crew took an early lead but Cambridge responded to win. Oxford's men were favourites to defeat Cambridge, but failed to do so: Cambridge won by just under one length. The reserve races took place three weeks later on 25 April 2021: Cambridge completed a clean sweep for a third consecutive year after Goldie won the men's and Blondie won the women's reserves race.

== Background ==
The 2021 race (course depicted) was held on the River Great Ouse.

The Boat Race is a side-by-side rowing competition between the University of Oxford (sometimes referred to as the "Dark Blues") and the University of Cambridge (sometimes referred to as the "Light Blues"). First held in 1829, the race usually takes place on the 4.2 mi (6.8 km) Championship Course, between Putney and Mortlake on the River Thames in south-west London. The 2020 event was cancelled as a result of the COVID-19 pandemic in the United Kingdom. In 2021, the race was held behind closed doors along a section of the River Great Ouse near Ely, Cambridgeshire. The organisers noted that the move to Ely was not only due to COVID-19, but also safety concerns relating to Hammersmith Bridge which had been closed to pedestrians after cracks in the structure had worsened. It was the second time in the event's 191-year history that the race had taken place near Ely: the previous occasion was an unofficial wartime staging of the event in 1944, which Oxford's men won by three-quarters of a length. The 2021 course started at the stone marking the end of that wartime race, and proceeded along a 4,890 m (5,350 yd) course, from the Queen Adelaide Bridge towards Littleport. Only the main men's and women's races were scheduled to take place on the same day — the women's race around 3:50 p.m. and the men's an hour later. The reserves races took place three weeks after the main event, on 25 April 2021.

The rivalry is a major point of honour between the two universities; the race is followed throughout the United Kingdom and broadcast worldwide. Cambridge's men went into the race as champions, having won the 2019 race by a margin of one length, and led overall with 84 victories to Oxford's 80 (the 1877 race was a dead heat). Cambridge's women were also victorious in 2019, winning by five lengths, which took the overall record in the Women's Boat Race to 44–30 in their favour.

In May 2020, the University of Cambridge's three boat clubs, Cambridge University Boat Club, Cambridge University Women's Boat Club and Cambridge University Lightweight Rowing Club, agreed to merge into a single club under the Cambridge University Boat Club (CUBC) name, with Callum Sullivan as the Men's President and Sophie Paine the Women's President. Alex Bebb held the position of Oxford University Boat Club (OUBC) president for the race while Kaitlyn Dennis was the Oxford University Women's Boat Club (OUWBC) president. The 75th women's race was umpired by international rowing judge Judith Packer, while the 166th men's race was officiated by Olympic bronze medallist Sarah Winckless. Both had been selected for the cancelled 2020 event, and it was the first time in the history of the event that women oversaw both main races.

The main races were streamed live on YouTube. They were also broadcast on television channels in the United Kingdom (BBC One), Canada (TSN2), Israel (Sport 3), New Zealand (Sky Sport 9), Spain (Teledeporte) and throughout most of Africa (SuperSport).

== Coaches ==
Sean Bowden was the chief coach for OUBC, having been responsible for the senior men's crew since 1997, winning 12 from the last 18 races. He is a former Great Britain Olympic coach and coached the Light Blues in the 1993 and 1994 Boat Races. His assistant coach was Brendan Gliddon, a South African who formerly coached under-23 and FISU teams for both South Africa and Great Britain. Alex Bowmer was OUBC's physical therapist. The OUWBC chief coach was Andy Nelder, who previously worked with Bowden and OUBC for eleven years. He was assisted by James Powell.

The Cambridge men's crew coaching team was led by their chief coach, Rob Baker, who had previously coached Cambridge's women to victories in both the 2017 and 2018 races, and Cambridge's men to a win in 2019. Cambridge women's chief coach was Robert Weber, who joined Cambridge University before the 2019 race from Hamilton College in New York, where he was Head Rowing Coach and Associate Professor of Physical Education. CUBC's assistant coaches were Paddy Ryan, Katy Knowles, Nick Acock and Jordan Stanley.

== Trials ==
Each year before Christmas, each squad stages a race between two of their eights over the Boat Race distance called Trial VIIIs. Normally, these are held on the Championship Course. To minimise the risk of COVID-19 transmission, the trials took place on the Great Ouse behind closed doors and there was no pre-race social media or marketing. Cambridge trials took place on 17 December 2020 and Oxford's races were staged two days later. Because of restrictions imposed by the university, Oxford had been prevented from practising on the water until 11 December 2020. As a result of changes to the UK's COVID-19 tier system, neither Winckless nor Packer were able to travel to Ely and both of Oxford's trial races were umpired by Kath Finucane, the reserve race official.

=== Women ===
The CUBC women's trial featured the boats Hakuna and Matata, named after the Swahili phrase which approximates to "no worries" used in The Lion King film. In fine conditions and umpired by Packer, Matata made the better start to lead by half a length at 500 m. At the inlet from the River Lark, Hakuna's cox, Dylan Whitaker, moved her boat into the middle of the river to take advantage of the faster flowing stream. Hakuna took the lead around the 3,000 m mark and pulled away to win in a time of 16 minutes 5 seconds, two lengths ahead of Matata.

OUWBC's trial boats were named after two of the pharmaceutical companies developing COVID-19 vaccines: Pfizer and AstraZeneca. Pfizer took an early lead and held an advantage of three-quarters of a length, but steering too close to their opponents, they clashed oars with AstraZeneca and were warned by Finucane. Five minutes into the race, Pfizer held a two-length lead and moved to the centre of the river. They extended their lead to three lengths before AstraZeneca reduced the deficit by half a length. As the crews passed the finishing line, Pfizer won by three lengths.

=== Men ===
The CUBC men's trial boats were named Henry I and 10,000 Eels to reflect Henry I's annual order of lampreys from Ely. Officiated by Winckless, both crews started strongly with Henry I holding a half-length lead after 500 m. They extended their lead by a quarter of length by 750 m and their cox attempted to move across to the centre of the river, receiving multiple warnings from Winckless. 10,000 Eels held their line and pulled back to within half a length by 1,250 m and while both crews pushed for the final 500 m, Henry I crossed the finishing line in 14 minutes 4 seconds, one third of a length ahead.

The OUBC trial boats were named Track and Trace, after the NHS Test and Trace system designed to help prevent the spread of COVID-19. Trace took an early lead in a race that was initially dominated by oar clashes. Track began to reduce the deficit as the crews passed the Lark, and following another clash, took the lead and held clear water advantage with 1,000 m to go, eventually beating Trace by two lengths.

== Crews ==
The crews for both senior boats were announced on 25 March 2021, on a Zoom call. The Cambridge women were considered strong favourites to win their race while Oxford's men were favoured to win.

=== Women ===
Women's crews
Seat	Oxford			Cambridge		
Seat	Name	Nationality	College	Name	Nationality	College
Bow	Katie Anderson	British	Brasenose	Adriana Perez Rotondo	Spanish	Newnham
2	Anja Zehfuss	American	Green Templeton	Sarah Portsmouth	British	Newnham
3	Megan Stoker	British	St Peter's	Abba Parker	American	Emmanuel
4	Amelia Standing	British	St Anne's	Caoimhe Dempsey	Irish	Newnham
5	Martha Birtles	British	Mansfield	Anouschka Fenley	British	Lucy Cavendish
6	Georgina Grant	British	Harris Manchester	Sophie Paine (P)	British/Bahamian	Girton
7	Julia Lindsay	Canadian	St Cross	Bronya Sykes	British	Gonville and Caius
Stroke	Katherine Maitland	British	St Hughs	Sarah Tisdall	Australian	Lucy Cavendish
Cox	Costi Levy	British/Italian	Exeter	Dylan Whitaker	British	King's
(P) – Boat club president; Kaitlyn Dennis was the non-rowing President of OUWBC

=== Men ===
Men's crews
Seat	Oxford			Cambridge		
Seat	Name	Nationality	College	Name	Nationality	College
Bow	James Forward	British	Pembroke	Theo Weinberger	British	St John's
2	Alex Bebb (P)	Canadian	St Peter's	Ben Dyer	British	Gonville and Caius
3	Martin Barakso	Canadian	Kellogg	Seb Benzecry	British	Jesus
4	Felix Drinkall	British	Lady Margaret Hall	Quinten Richardson	Canadian	Fitzwilliam
5	Tobias Schröder	Estonian/British	Magdalen	Garth Holden	South African	St Edmund's
6	Jean-Philippe Dufour	Swiss/Canadian	Lincoln	Ollie Parish	British/Canadian	Peterhouse
7	Joshua Bowesman-Jones	British	Keble	Callum Sullivan (P)	British	Peterhouse
Stroke	Augustin Wambersie	Belgian	St Catherine's	Drew Taylor	American	Clare
Cox	Jesse Oberst	American	Pembroke	Charlie Marcus	British	Trinity
(P) – Boat club president

== Races ==
Conditions on race day were reasonably clement with a temperature of 16 °C (61 °F) and clear skies with a westward crosswind.

=== Women's ===
Cambridge won the toss and elected to start on the west side of the river. After a brief delay before both coxes indicated they were ready to start, the race commenced at 3:53 p.m. Early on Oxford were warned by Packer for encroaching into Cambridge's water and were instructed to steer away, and Cambridge took a slight lead. Both boats were close to one another and four minutes in, Oxford held a slight advantage, although Packer continued to warn the Dark Blue cox. After seven minutes, Oxford was around a third of a length ahead as Cambridge started a push, taking a lead with fourteen minutes of the race gone. The Light Blues held a length's lead a minute later and although Oxford remained in touch, Cambridge passed the finishing line first. It was Cambridge's fourth consecutive victory and took the overall record in the event to 45–30 in their favour.

=== Men's ===
Oxford took the west side of the river. The men's race started at 4:53 p.m. with Oxford falling behind despite a slightly higher stroke rate than their opponents. Within two minutes, Cambridge was almost a length ahead but was warned several times by Winckless for encroachment. Four minutes in, she issued a warning to both crews of potential debris in the river ahead which both crews navigated without issue. Oxford then went for a push in the sixth minute but Cambridge remained in the lead, although down to half a length. At the ten-minute mark, Cambridge pushed before Oxford reciprocated two minutes later and, with less than 1,000 m (3,300 ft) remaining, the Dark Blues began to reduce the deficit. Cambridge passed the finishing line first, winning by almost one length. It was Cambridge's fourth victory in the last five races, and took the overall record in the event to 85–80 in their favour.

=== Reaction ===
According to tradition, both winning coxes were thrown into the river, however this year they were followed by the victorious crews. Sarah Tisdall, Cambridge's stroke, was magnanimous in victory: "Awesome race, massive congrats to Oxford. That's the closest boat race the females have had." The Cambridge women's president Sophie Paine received the trophy and noted that "I think this is absolutely historic for women. So many of us have been training for this for two years now, and it means so much for us to have that pay off."

James Cracknell suggested that the Oxford men's cox should have "steered into those reeds and forced a restart". The bow for Cambridge men's boat, Theo Weinberger, suggested that he would "dream of this moment ... it's two years' worth of training and hard work ... there's anything you can quite compare it to." Cambridge's men's president Callum Sullivan described the season as "fantastically unique".

The winning margin in both races was less than one length, which was the narrowest in the men's race since 2003 and in the women's race since 2011.

=== Reserves ===
Both reserves races were held along the same section of the River Great Ouse three weeks later, on 25 April 2021. CUBC's Blondie beat Oxford's Osiris in the 49th women's reserve boat race by seven lengths. In the 56th men's reserve race, CUBC's Goldie secured a six-length victory over OUBC's Isis. CUBC Women's spare pair won their race easily after the OUWBC spare pair capsized in rough water at Ely, OUBC won the men's spare pair race.

=== Lightweights ===
The 2021 Lightweight Boat Races were also held at Ely. On 18 May 2021, CUBC Lightweight Women beat Oxford University Women's Lightweight Rowing Club by 2 1/2 lengths. In the Lightweight Men's Boat Race on 23 May 2021, OULRC beat CUBC Lightweight Men by 1 1/2 lengths, thus preventing a Cambridge clean sweep of all 6 boat races, last achieved in 2018.

== Bibliography ==
- The Boat Race. The Boat Race Company Limited. December 2020.
