= Cambridge University Lightweight Rowing Club =

British rowing club

- Location: Cambridge, United Kingdom
- Home water: River Cam and River Great Ouse
- Founded: 1974
- Affiliations: British Rowing
- Website: www.culrc.org.uk
- Acronym: CULRC

Events
- Henley Boat Races

Notable members
- Roderick Chisholm (rower); Nick English; Tom Middleton; Mark Aldred; Simon Case

Cambridge University Lightweight Rowing Club (CULRC) was the University rowing club for lightweight male oarsmen at the University of Cambridge, principally to race against Oxford University Lightweight Rowing Club (OULRC) annually in the Lightweight Men's Boat Race.

In April 2020 it was agreed that CULRC would combine with the openweight men's club CUBC and the women's club CUWBC into one club. The merger took place on 1 August 2020. CUBC now selects a lightweight men's Blue Boat from the men's squad to represent Cambridge at the Lightweight Boat Races.

== History ==
The club was founded in 1974 by Richard Bates and raced against Oxford in 1975. These races were the basis on which the Henley Boat Races were later founded. For more than twenty five years Robert Greatorex presided over the club. In recent years, the club fielded two crews each year, the lightweight Blue Boat and Granta, the lightweight reserve crew. The reserve boat, Granta, raced Oxford's equivalent, Nephthys, from 2000 until 2007 and restarted racing Oxford in a pairs race in recent years.

For a brief period in 1999 - 2002 there was an active old boys club "Farmer" whose finest race was beating the 1999 Nephthys crew by 2L.

The Blue Boat crew have the right to wear a distinctive uniform. As a half blue sport, they wear a unique Cambridge blue and white striped blazer with the club insignia on the chest pocket. This blazer design has been retained by the Blue Boat upon merger with CUBC. Blue Boat oarsmen who go on to win a round of the Temple Challenge Cup or Prince Albert Challenge Cup at Henley Royal Regatta in the same season as their Boat Race are awarded Discretionary Full Blues and are entitled to wear a Cambridge blue blazer with the club insignia on the chest pocket. Granta members who race in the Reserve race against Nepthys are entitled to wear the Granta Colours blazer, the same design as the Blue Boat but without the club insignia on the chest pocket.

== Past Crews ==
This is a list of CULRC/CUBC crews who have raced the men's lightweight boat race against Oxford

| Date | Result | Winning time | Winning margin (lengths) | Crew (rowers are listed left to right in boat position from bow to stroke, followed by the cox) |
|---|---|---|---|---|
| 1975 | Won | | | R. Bates, T, Rossiter, N. Burnet, D. Reddaway, D. Dumbell, R. Greatorex, J. Barter, M. Archer, A Elgood |
| 1976 | Lost | | | P. Summers, P. Watson, M. Rockel, I. Pritchard, F. Suess, R. Greatorex, J. Watson, J. Hare, A. Narula |
| 1977 | Lost | | | I. Pritchard, W. Bradbury, J. Hutton, D. Jennings, P. Summers, J. Hare, F. Suess, P. Watson, J. Till |
| 1978 | Won | 5:48 | 2/3 | P. Ainsworth, B. Booth, N. Thomas, S. Phillips, A. Parks, P. Munro-Faure, P. Watson, A. Hay, P. Smith |
| 1979 | Won | 5.39 | 2/3 | J. Chauncy, S. Trowell, A. Dunlop, B. Booth, J. Ambrose, D. Jennings, C. Hyatt, S. Worth, A. Bustany |
| 1980 | Won | | 2 | Steve Jones, Steve Brown, Simon Bowden, Ian Nissenbaum, Neil Smilth, Dale Jennings, Tony Williams, Rob Robinson, Alan Bustany |
| 1981 | Won | | Canvas | Rob Howlett, Rory Seaton, Simon Bowden, Steve Brown, Simon Cole, Charlie Winslade, Steve Jones, Chris Harris, Joe Sell |
| 1982 | Won | | 1/3 | Jeremy Arnold, Ian Brown, James Cox, Chris Harris, Ewen Wigley, Ric Paige, Dave Pocock, Steve Jones, Julien Hartley |
| 1983 | Won | 6:53 | 3 | Adrian Manning, John Stephenson, Ed Piggott, Richard Millett, David McGinnis, Tim Lucas, Steve Jones, Guy Eastaugh, Henry Dunlop |
| 1984 | Won | | 1 1/3 | Jeremy H.Boardman, Tim Raffle, Nicholas E.S.Bugg, Martin White, Stephen Kirkpatrick, Stephen Williams, John Stebbing, Neil S.P..Blundell, Henry W. Dunlop. |
| 1985 | Won | | 6 ft | Piers Copham, Andrew Hobart, Bruce Braithwaite, David Wright, Andrew Kelly, Martin White, Roberto Townshend, Paul Sansome, Andrew Holmes |
| 1986 | Won | | 2 | Mark Binns, Ian Cammack, Andrew Hobart, Jerry Dawes, Henry Elkington, Julian Hanson, Rod Peters, Chris Jacob, John Benford |
| 1987 | Won | 6:09 | 1/2 | Charlie Rowley, John Wilson, Mark Ingham, David Calder, Richard Morgan, James Irvine, Jeremy Dawes, Rod Hiorns, Keven Mentzel |
| 1988 | Won | 5:50 | 1/2 | B. Potterill, A.C King, A.D Oberreit, R.P.D Foster, P.J Gordon, R.E Hiorns, A.G Hobart, J.P.H Entwisle, Miss J.A Horne |
| 1989 | Won | 5:51 | 4 1/2 | P.H Gillespie, C.I Pritchard, A.J Rowell, D.R.P Vye, C.J Meyrick, M Cross, B.R Potterill, R.P.D Foster, N Harris |
| 1990 | Won | 6:40 | 4 3/4 | P.H Gillespie, A.J Bird, D.J Lipson, A.R Wiliams, D.M.P Height, A.G Goyder, T.W Owen, C.I. Pritchard, K.V Haslett |
| 1991 | Won | 6:39 | 1/3 | P Woodburn, R Rayward, J Milne, M Dickinson, R Williams, R Quickfall, S Johns, M Tovell, R Reeve |
| 1992 | Lost | 5:40 | 2 1/2 | D.H.B Burgess, A.R Kennedy, P.J Woodburn, R.P Tett, N.L.G Hopley, J.S Riley, A.H.R Stewart, M Tovell, F Pritchard |
| 1993 | Won | 5:39 | 1/2 | S.A.S Walker, C.K Vincent, S.C.R Donne, S Jose, A.J Kuropatwa, C Harris, D.H.R Burgess, M.J Webb, S.Patel |
| 1994 | Lost | 5:35 | 3/4 | Andy Jones, George Gilbert, Hari Jayram, Tim Rollingsonn, Zac Peake, Matt Webb, Sim Fuller, Oliver Kuropatwa, Ian Cragg-Hine |
| 1995 | Won | 5:29 | 1/3 | Mike Lea*, Dan Oldfield, J. Smallwood, Matt Rayham, M.R Clarke, Rod Chisholm, Matt Webb, Wayne Baker, Laura Marx |
| 1996 | Lost | NRO disq | | Charlie Tavener, Tom Killick, Tom Middleton, Mike "Buck" Rogers, Hari Jayaram*, Edwin Truesdale, Jamie Sporle, Bruce Perry, Jason Yeung |
| 1997 | Lost | 5:49 | 1 | Jon Key, Tom Killick*, Dave Lowish, Martin Hoather, Trond Bustnes, Justin Slater, Dan Darley, Bruce Perry, Zack Taylor |
| 1998 | Won | 5:45 | 1/2 | David Tait, Marten Brelen, Bruce Perry*, Alex O'Reilly, Nick de Pennington, Martin Hoather, Tom Latter, Tom Killick, Laura Watkins |
| 1999 | Lost | 5:31 | 1 1/2 | James Porter, David Tait, Dave Lowish, Mike Rogers, Nick de Pennington, Matt Arnold, Tom Latter*, Matt Newland, Brad Parr |
| 2000 | Won | 5:40 | 2 | Chris Wright, Alex Aiken, Pete Forester, Luke Lewis, Garan Jenkin, Jamie Bottomley, Nick English, Jon Hickey, Alice Johnson-Marshall |
| 2001 | Won | 6:33 | 4 | Alex Brooks, Chris Morgan, Andy Adams, Alex Knott, Nick English, Jamie Bottomley, Charlie Bourne, Alex Higham, Eleanor Griggs |
| 2002 | Lost | 5:21 | 2 | Rob Ennals, Oli Watkins, Simon Case, Alex Higham, Lawrence Taylor, Ian Craig, Charles Bourne, Jamie Bottomley, Vanessa Murrie |
| 2003 | Lost | 5:55 | 1 1/4 | Alex Summers, Joe Grundy, Jeremy Boote, Charlie Reid, Alex Hamilton, Doug Perrin, Lawrence Taylor, Owen Richards, Holly Rogers |
| 2004 | Lost | 5:36 | 1/2 | Doug Perrin, Alex Summers, Andy Hudson, Geoff Ball, Simon Kerr, Nick Armitage, Geoff Roberts, Tom Dyson, Rebecca Dowbiggin |
| 2005 | Lost | 5:51 | 3 | Colin Prue, Alex Summers, Simon Evans, John Winny, Tim Perera, John Prendergast, George Wallis, Tom Dyson, Dyfan Howells |
| April 1, 2006 | Lost | 5:18 | 2 1/4 | Rafael Mora, Ed Pain, Emmanuel Moll, Jon Winny, John Davies, Will Buttinger, Ian Sealey, Callum Stewart |
| April 1, 2007 | Lost | 3:44 | 1 | Christopher Kerr, Sam Thompson, Ian Sealey, James Fulcher, George Blessley, Jon Stockton, Charlie Pitt-Ford, Will Calvert, Dave White |
| March 23, 2008 | Lost | 6:15 | 2 1/2 | John Kyffin, James Fulcher, Ben Thomas, Peter Herrick, Alex Markham, George Blessley*, Mark Aldred, Christopher Kerr, Ted Randolph |
| March 22, 2009 | Won | 5:49 | 3 | Christopher Kerr, John Kiely, Alistair Chappelle, Mark Aldred, George Blessley*, John Hale, Iain Rist, Donald Evans, Elizabeth Box |
| March 28, 2010 | Won | 5:28 | 2 ft | Christopher Kerr, Matt Lawes, Christopher Bellamy, Iain Rist, Charlie Pitt-Ford, Tom Coker, Alistair Chappelle*, John Hale, Ruth Coverdale |
| March 27, 2011 | Lost | 5:54 | Canvas | Sam Blackwell, Charlie Adams, Rupert Price, Sam Hayes, Christopher Bellamy*, John Hale, Piran Tedbury, Olli Lupton, Katie Phillips |
| March 25, 2012 | Won | 6:00 | 3/4 | James Wedlake, Martin Kubie, Simon Morris, Matthew White, Charlie Pitt-Ford, Piran Tedbury, Rupert Price, Nicolas Kernick, Michael Hook |
| March 24, 2013 | Lost | 6:49 | 1 2/3 | William Handy, Christopher Kerr, Nikodem Szumilo, Nicolas Kernick, Andrzej Hunt, James Wedlake, Simon Morris, William Kenyon, Jonathon Dean |
| March 30, 2014 | Won | 5:30 | 3 1/2 | Greg Street, Emanuel Malek, James Green, Andrei Lebed, Nikodem Szumilo, William Hayes, Giovanni Bergamo Andreis, Andrzej Hunt, Callum Mantell |
| April 5, 2015 | Won | 5:55 | 4 ft | Tim Rademacher, Thomas Wileman, Moritz Matthey, Lawrence Clare, Charlie Cullen, Archie Wood, Raffaele Nicholas Russo, Tom Chess, Alistair Nelson |
| March 19, 2016 | Won | 6:19 | Easily | Ben Mackworth, Thomas Wileman, Jamie Brown, Sam Philpott, Theo Clark, Charlie Cummins, Charlie Cullen, Giovanni Bergamo Andreis, Sneha Naik |
| March 26, 2017 | Won | 6:07 | 1 3/4 | Chris Jones, Robbie Sewell, Zenas van Veldhoven, Charlie Cummins, Ben Mackworth, Sam Philpott, Jamie Brown*, Giovanni Bergamo Andreis, Dom Hall |
| March 19, 2018 | Won | 6:26 | 1/3 | Calum McRae, Julian Sproßmann, Zenas van Veldhoven*, Neil Paul, Theo Weinberger, Felix Koninx, Ben Mackworth, Sam Philpott, Juliet Armstrong |
| March 23, 2019 | Lost | 17:44 | 2 1/4 | Peter Taylor, Teague Smith, Freddie Markanday, Sam Armstrong, Daumantas Kavolis, Tom Roe*, Jonathan Vibhishanan, Michael Diggin, Jack Mason |
| March 15, 2020 | Lost | 18:50 | 3 1/2 | Luke Andrews, Matthew Edge, James Crossley, Eytan Cortissos, Daumantas Kavolis, James Lee, Ben Wood, Teague Smith*, Jamie Bailey |
| May 23, 2021 | Lost | 14:19 | 1 1/2 | Cameron Mackenzie, Fred Gillard, Sam Kitto, Eytan Cortissos*, Freddie Scott, Rob Peacock, Calum McRae, Matthew Edge, Holly Beveridge |
| March 20, 2022 | Won | 18:01 | 5 | Harry Fieldhouse, Zuhri James, Freddie Markanday, Orlando Morley, Ed Townsend, Cameron Mackenzie, Ben Wood, Matthew Edge*, Felix Craig-McFeely |
| March 20, 2023 | Won | 18:17 | 11 | Thomas Heppel, Sam Taylor, Sam Clarke, Joe Holey, Gianluca Vartan, Harry Fieldhouse*, Ben Jones, Lewis Gray, Tteja Senthilnathan |
| March 29, 2024 | Won | 20:15 | 5.5 | Emile Czernuszka, Sam Taylor, Gianluca Vartan, Harry Fieldhouse, Ben Jones*, Freddie Markanday, Thomas Heppel, Lewis Gray, Ben Harding |
| April 12, 2025 | Won | 17:34 | 4.5 | Jeremy Wilkinson, Gianluca Maffi*, Will Morris, Josh Moore, Ben Isherwood, Janik Schüttler, Theo Hatcher, James Richards, Isabella Fiske-Harrison |
| April 3, 2026 | Won | 18:38 | 7 | Victor Viennot-Bourgin, Jeremy Wilkinson, Peter Crossley, Nikita Mohr, Josh Moore*, Frederick Challacombe, James Richards, Archie Smith, Alex Taylor |

- Denotes President

== Reserve crews (Granta) ==
This is a list of CULRC/CUBC Granta crews who have raced the Lightweight Reserve Race against Oxford.

| Date | Result | Race Type | Winning time | Winning margin (lengths) | Crew (rowers are listed left to right in boat position from bow to stroke, followed by the cox) |
|---|---|---|---|---|---|
| 2000 | Won | VIII | 5:50 | 2.75 | Alex P Harrison, Matthew Lovett, Peter W.J Rutland, David Howard, George D.R Garforth-Bles, Christopher J Morgan, Charles G.F Bourne, Richard Sutton, Elizabeth C Grose |
| 2001 | Lost | VIII | | 1.5 | T.A.W Jarratt, J.E.H Smith, J.E.N Price, D. Tinkler, C. Sugihara, E. Richardson, R. Muir, A.J Gilmore, C.R Bolton |
| 2002 | Lost | VIII | 5:33 | 2 | M.B Suret, J.W Grundy, A.J Barr, A.F Ford, G.J Brook, J.D Wright, T.W Rose, J.P D'Arcy, E. Nesbit |
| 2003 | Won | VIII | 6:19 | 2.75 | Mel Harbour, Tim Steele, Ross Cook, Ed Peacock, Andy Rankin, Ross Williamson, James Wright, Edd Knowles, Ellen Nisbet |
| 2004 | Lost | VIII | 5:45 | Canvas | G.W Wallis, G. Sills, P.D Allen, J.R Third, P.E Hayball, C.A.F Read, N.R Thornton, T.C Keeling, S.C Daniell |
| 2005 | Lost | VIII | 6:07 | 4.5 | E. Moll, A.D Twigg, N.P.J Grafton-Green, J.R.W Hewitt, P.E Hayball, J.C Williams, E. Deadman, E.J Farnell, L. Preece |
| 2006 | Lost | VIII | 5:26 | 5 | G. Matmon, C.P.L Meakins, J.C Williams, S. Pancratz, A. Hegarty, D. Reading-Picopoulos, C.J Kerr, G.J.A Hughes, C.H Logan |
| 2016 | Won | IVx- | | 2 | Barney Plummer, James Green, Haofeng Xu, Brennan Heames |
| 2017 | Won | VIII | 5:38 | 3.5 | Jon Swain, Ed Nash, Sam Pettinger-Harte, James Wood, Jake Rowe, Hugo Ventham, George Hawkswell, Nicholas Rice, Juliet Armstrong |
| 2018 | Won | IV+ | 7:24 | 1 | Jonathan Shoesmith, Nicholas Rice, Hugo Ventham, Thomas Roe, Catriona Bourne Swinton Hunter |
| 2019 | Lost | 2- | | | Jan Helmich, Matt Webb |
| 2020 | Lost | 2- | | Canvas | Eryk Sokolowski, Jack Reid |
| 2021 | Lost | 2- | | 1 | Luke Andrews, Alexander Miscampbell |
| 2022 | Won | 2- | | 2 | Hal Barrow, Gianluca Maffi |
| 2023 | Won | 2- | | 5 | Gianluca Maffi, Jack Saville |
| 2024 | Won | 2- | | 4 | Will Liu, Jack Morley |
| 2025 | Won | 2- | | Easily | Alex Tocher, Peter Crossley |
| 2026 | Won | 2- | | 16 | William Woodard, James Nash |

== International representation ==
- 2016 Rio — Mark Aldred GBR LM4-
- 2014 World Rowing Championships, Amsterdam — Mark Aldred GBR LM4- - Bronze
- 2013 World Rowing Championships, Chungju — Mark Aldred GBR LM2- - Bronze
- 2012 London — Roderick Chisholm (rower) Aus LM2x - 13th place
- 2008 Beijing — Roderick Chisholm (rower) Aus LM4- - 9th place
- 2004 Athens — Nick English GB LM4- - 13th place
- 2000 Sydney — Tom Middleton GB LM2x - 14th place

== See also ==
- University rowing (UK)
- Cambridge University Combined Boat Club - responsible for the day-to-day running of college rowing in Cambridge
- Cambridge University Women's Boat Club
- Cambridge University Boat Club
