= Alexander Bird =

British philosopher

- Born: Alexander James Bird; 1964 (age 61–62)
- Awards: AHRC Fellowship; Philosophical Quarterly essay prize Mind Association Senior Research Fellowship

Education
- Education: Westminster School; St John's College, Oxford (BA); LMU Munich; St Edmund's College, Cambridge (MPhil); King's College, Cambridge (PhD)
- Thesis: Arithmetic, Grammar, and Ontology (1991)
- Academic advisor: D. H. Mellor

Philosophical work
- Era: Contemporary philosophy
- Region: Western philosophy
- School: Analytic philosophy
- Institutions: University of Bristol; King's College London
- Main interests: Philosophy of science, philosophy of medicine, metaphysics, epistemology
- Notable ideas: Dispositional essentialist account of the laws of nature

Alexander James Bird (born 1964) is a British philosopher and Bertrand Russell Professor of Philosophy at St John's College, Cambridge.

== Career ==
In 2020, Bird was elected to the Bertrand Russell Professorship of Philosophy, succeeding Huw Price. Previously he was Peter Sowerby Professor of Philosophy and Medicine at King's College London (2018–2020) and the professor of philosophy at the University of Bristol (2003–2017). Bird was lecturer then reader and head of department at the University of Edinburgh (1993–2003). Bird has also taught at Dartmouth College and at Saint Louis University and was a visiting fellow at All Souls College, Oxford. He was chair of the philosophy sub-panel in Research Excellence Framework 2014.

Bird rowed three times in the Henley Boat Races, in 1984 and 1985 (President) for OULRC against CULRC, and in 1990 for CULRC against OULRC.

On December 11, 2023, he was elected as a corresponding member of the French Académie des sciences morales et politiques.

== Books ==
- Philosophy of Science, Routledge, 1998
- Thomas Kuhn, Princeton University Press, 2000
- Nature's Metaphysics, Oxford University Press, 2007
- Knowing Science, Oxford University Press, 2022
