= Stephanie Cullen =

British rower

Personal information
- Nationality: British
- Born: 27 November 1980 (age 45) Bury, Greater Manchester
Medal record
Women's rowing
Representing Great Britain
World Rowing Championships
Gold medal – first place	2011 Bled	LW4x
Silver medal – second place	2009 Poznań	LW4x

Stephanie Cullen (born 27 November 1980 in Bury) is a business woman and former British rower. She was part of the British squad that topped the medal table at the 2011 World Rowing Championships in Bled, where she won a gold medal as part of the lightweight quad sculls with Imogen Walsh, Kathryn Twyman and Andrea Dennis. Cullen represented Great Britain in three World Championships in the LW4x and two World Cups in the LW2x, racing with Andrea Dennis. A member of London Rowing Club since 2006, Cullen represented the club at Henley Royal Regatta in the quadruple sculls, and won the Elite LW2x at Henley Women’s Regatta in 2009, racing with Elaine Johnstone. She had previously represented Vesta Rowing Club in the Remenham Challenge Cup.

Cullen attended Bury Grammar School and went on to study chemistry at the University of Oxford, Hertford College, where she obtained a 2:1 in her master's degree (MChem). It was during her time at Oxford that she discovered a talent for rowing, and she became Boatclub Captain, then President, leading the women's 1st and 2nd VIII to a historic double blades in the Summer Eights 2002 and winning the Boatrace with the Oxford University Women's Lightweight Rowing Club by 2 lengths in 2003. Her portrait now hangs in Hertford College hall in acknowledgment of her achievements.

After the 2011 World Championships, Cullen retired from elite rowing and pursued her professional career in the corporate data, tech and analytics sector. She is currently the UK SVP CPG for Circana and was formerly Head of Business Insight for Britvic. In 2018 she was named as one of the ‘20 in Data & Technology’ by Women in Data.
