= 2016 World Rowing Championships – Women's lightweight quadruple sculls =

Women's lightweight quadruple sculls at the 2016 World Rowing Championships
- Venue: Willem-Alexander Baan
- Location: Rotterdam, Netherlands
- Dates: 22–27 August
- Competitors: 20 from 5 nations
- Winning time: 7:10:60

Medalists
gold medal	Brianna Stubbs; Emily Craig; Imogen Walsh; Eleanor Piggott	Great Britain
silver medal	Judith Anlauf; Leonie Pieper; Lena Reuss; Katrin Thoma	Germany
bronze medal	Xuan Xulian; Zhang Weixiao; Zhang Weimiao; Yan Xiaohua	China

The women's lightweight quadruple sculls competition at the 2016 World Rowing Championships in Rotterdam took place at the Willem-Alexander Baan.

== Schedule ==
The schedule was as follows:

Date	Time	Round
Monday 22 August 2016	17:35	Exhibition race
Saturday 27 August 2016	13:10	Final

All times are Central European Summer Time (UTC+2)

== Results ==
=== Exhibition race ===
With fewer than seven entries in this event, boats contested a race for lanes before the final.

Rank	Rowers	Country	Time
1	Brianna Stubbs; Emily Craig; Imogen Walsh; Eleanor Piggott	Great Britain	6:35.11
2	Judith Anlauf; Leonie Pieper; Lena Reuss; Katrin Thoma	Germany	6:37.51
3	Xuan Xulian; Zhang Weixiao; Zhang Weimiao; Yan Xiaohua	China	6:40.33
4	Ashley Amos; Monica Whitehouse; Morgan McGovern; Emily Schmieg	United States	6:42.59
5	Jenna Pelham; Sydney Boyes; Jill Moffatt; Kathryn Twyman	Canada	6:43.90

=== Final ===
The final determined the rankings.

Rank	Rowers	Country	Time
1st place, gold medalist(s)	Brianna Stubbs; Emily Craig; Imogen Walsh; Eleanor Piggott	Great Britain	7:10.60
2nd place, silver medalist(s)	Judith Anlauf; Leonie Pieper; Lena Reuss; Katrin Thoma	Germany	7:12.45
3rd place, bronze medalist(s)	Xuan Xulian; Zhang Weixiao; Zhang Weimiao; Yan Xiaohua	China	7:21.04
4	Jenna Pelham; Sydney Boyes; Jill Moffatt; Kathryn Twyman	Canada	7:23.57
5	Ashley Amos; Monica Whitehouse; Morgan McGovern; Emily Schmieg	United States	7:26.24
