= Brianna Stubbs =

British rower

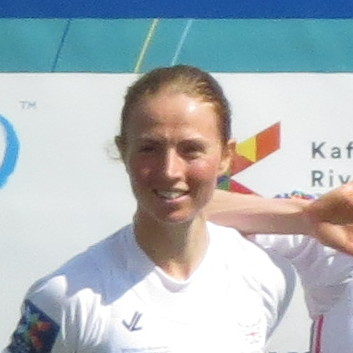
- Brianna Stubbs in 2015

Personal information
- Born: 13 July 1991 (age 34) Poole, United Kingdom

Sport
- Club: Wallingford RC
Medal record
Women's rowing
Representing Great Britain
World Championships
| Gold medal – first place | 2016 Rotterdam | Lwt quad sculls |
| Silver medal – second place | 2015 Aiguebelette | Lwt quad sculls |
World U23 Championships
| Gold medal – first place | 2013 Linz | Lwt double sculls |
World Junior Championships
| Silver medal – second place | 2009 Brive-la Gaillarde | Coxless four |

Brianna Stubbs (born 13 July 1991) is an elite British rower and research scientist who won two gold medals for Great Britain at the 2013 U23 and 2016 World Rowing Championships. She was the youngest person to row across the English Channel when she completed the feat in 2004, at the age of 12. Her research is focussed on the metabolism of ketone drinks, and has been based at Oxford University. In 2014, she was included in the BBC's 100 Women.

== Life ==
Stubbs was born in Poole and attended Canford School. Her father, Mark Stubbs, was a rower. Brianna completed the crossing of the English Channel with her father as part of his preparation for the ocean row.

In 2010 she went up to Pembroke College, Oxford, to study medicine. After completing a three-year Bachelors in Preclinical Sciences, she was awarded an Industrial Fellowship by the Royal Commission for the Exhibition of 1851, in order to study for a D.Phil. in Physiology. She joined a research team involved in developing a ketone drink for use in sports, with her own research focussed on ketone metabolism in athletes, the effects of different ketone supplements on human physiology, and the effects of ketone drinks on appetite.

In 2017, Stubbs took the role of Research Lead with a Silicon Valley–based start-up, HVMN., where she helped to secure $6 million STTR contract for the study of ketone esters in extreme environments.

In 2019, Stubbs took up the role of Lead Translational Scientist at The Buck Institute., working with a research group specializing in effects of ketone bodies on aging.

== Rowing career ==
Stubbs' first involvement in international rowing was in 2007, when she rowed in the GB vs France match race as a spare. In 2009 she won a silver medal as a member of the Junior Women's Four. Stubbs won the Oxford vs. Cambridge Women's Boat Race in 2010 and 2011, competing for OUWBC. Making the change to the lightweight category and moving to Wallingford Rowing Club, she gained International selection and won the 2013 World Rowing Championships in the lightweight women's double scull, with Eleanor Piggott.

Stubbs gained her first senior international vest at the 2014 World Rowing Championships in the Lightweight Women's Quadruple Sculls, finishing 6th. At the 2015 World Rowing Championships in France, Stubbs was part of the silver medal-winning team in the Lightweight Women's Quadruple Sculls, along with Ruth Walczak, Emily Craig and Eleanor Piggott. At the following year's championships in Rotterdam, she was part of the gold medal-winning team in the same event, along with Craig, Piggott, and Imogen Walsh.

Since retiring from rowing, Stubbs has qualified for the IronMan 70.3 World Championships twice, in 2018 and 2020. Stubbs qualified for the IronMan World Championships in Kona by placing first in the F30-34 age group at the 2021 North American IronMan Championships in Tulsa, Oklahoma, in a time of 10 hours 15 minutes and 6 seconds.
