= Bertrand Russell Professorship of Philosophy =

Teaching position at the University of Cambridge

The Bertrand Russell Professorship of Philosophy is the senior professorship in philosophy at the University of Cambridge. It was established in 1896 and named the Bertrand Russell Professorship of Philosophy in 2010, after a successful fundraising appeal to endow the post. The incumbent Bertrand Russell Professor is Alexander Bird, who succeeded Huw Price in October 2020.

== Holders ==
- James Ward (1896–1925)
- G. E. Moore (1925–1939)
- Ludwig Wittgenstein (1939–1947)
- G. H. von Wright (1948–1951)
- John Wisdom (1952–1968)
- Elizabeth Anscombe (1970–1986)
- D. H. Mellor (1986–1999)
- Simon Blackburn (2001–2011)
- Huw Price (2011–2020)
- Alexander Bird (2020–present)
