= Ruth Walczak =

British rower

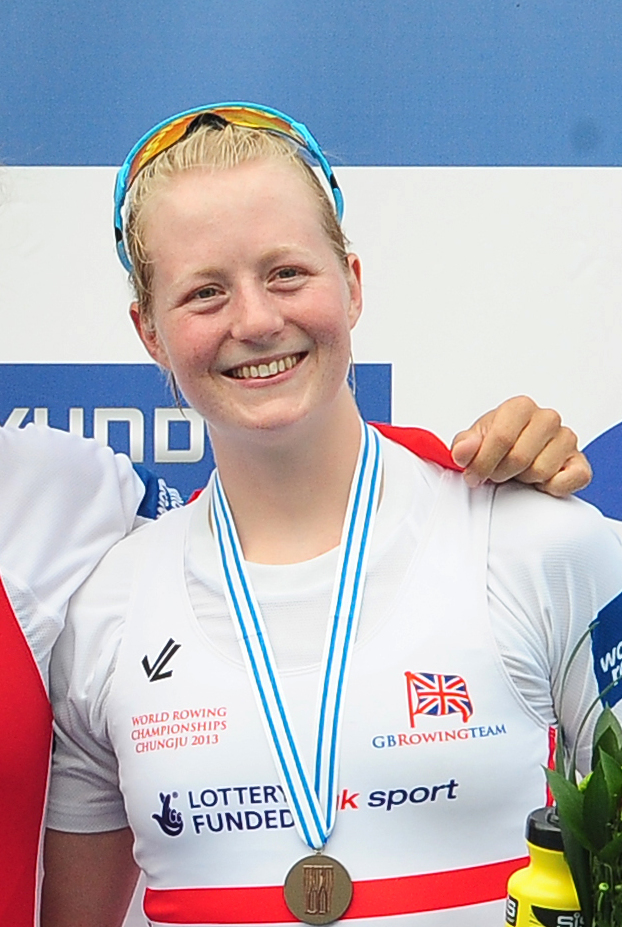
- Walczak in 2013

Personal information
- Born: 15 September 1988 (age 37)

Sport
- Country: Great Britain
- Club: Molesey Boat Club
Medal record
Women's rowing
Representing Great Britain
World Championships
Bronze medal – third place	2013 Chungju	Ltw single scull
Silver medal – second place	2015 Aiguebelette	Ltw quad sculls

Ruth Walczak (born 15 September 1988) is a British rower.

== Rowing career ==
Walczak made her British junior debut in 2005 and also made four appearances at the World U23 Championships. She won a bronze medal in the lightweight single scull at the 2013 World Rowing Championships in Chungju and finished in ninth place at the 2014 World Rowing Championships. Walczak was part of the British team that topped the medal table at the 2015 World Rowing Championships at Lac d'Aiguebelette in France, where she won a silver medal as part of the lightweight quadruple sculls with Brianna Stubbs, Emily Craig and Eleanor Piggott.
