= Eleanor Piggott =

British rower

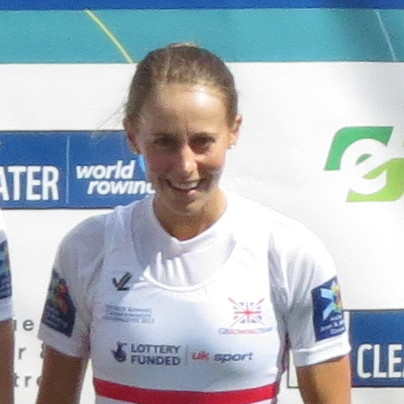

Personal information
- Nationality: British
- Born: 16 May 1991 (age 35)
- Education: University of Oxford

Sport
- Sport: Rowing
- Club: Wallingford RC
Medal record
Women's rowing
Representing Great Britain
World Championships
Gold medal – first place	2016 Rotterdam	Lwt quad sculls
Silver medal – second place	2015 Aiguebelette	Lwt quad sculls

Eleanor "Ellie" Piggott (born 16 May 1991) is an English rower, who won a gold medal as part of the Great Britain rowing squad at the 2016 World Rowing Championships, in the Women's Quad sculls event.

== Rowing career ==
Piggott comes from Bedford. She is a graduate of Pembroke College, Oxford, and a member of Wallingford Rowing Club.

She won her first gold at the World Rowing U23 Championships in 2013. She was part of the British team that topped the medal table at the 2015 World Rowing Championships at Lac d'Aiguebelette in France, where she won a silver medal as part of the lightweight quadruple sculls with Brianna Stubbs, Ruth Walczak and Emily Craig.

At the 2016 championships in Rotterdam, her women's lightweight quadruple sculls crew of Brianna Stubbs, Emily Craig and Imogen Walsh fought off competition from Germany and China, to win gold and finish with a time of 7:10:60 in the final.

Piggott represented Great Britain at the first stage of the 2018 World Rowing Cup in Belgrade, and at the second stage of the event in Ottensheim.

Piggott is also a double blue, twice winner of the Oxford - Cambridge Women's Boat Race for Oxford.
