= Andrea Dennis =

British rower

Personal information
- Nationality: British
- Born: 3 January 1982 (age 44) Oxford
Medal record
Women's rowing
Representing Great Britain
World Rowing Championships
Gold medal – first place	2011 Bled	LW4x
Silver medal – second place	2009 Poznań	LW4x

Andrea Dennis (born 3 January 1982, in Oxford) is a former British rower. She was part of the British squad that topped the medal table at the 2011 World Rowing Championships in Bled, where she won a gold medal as part of the lightweight quad sculls with Stephanie Cullen, Imogen Walsh and Kathryn Twyman.

Dennis studied at Reading University.
