= Imogen Walsh =

British rower

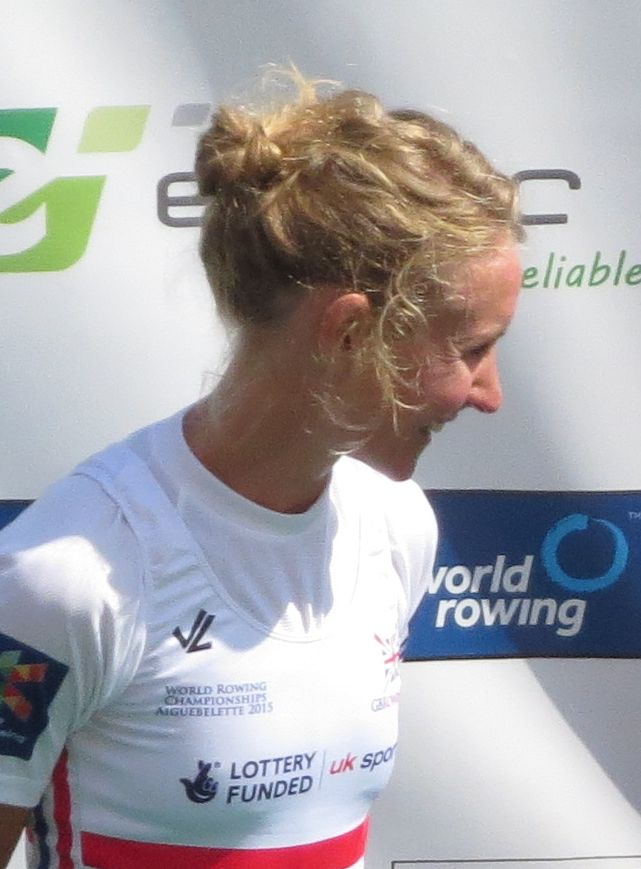
- Walsh in September 2015

Personal information
- Born: 17 January 1984 (age 42) Glasgow, Scotland
Medal record
Women's rowing
Representing Great Britain
World Championships
Gold medal – first place	2011 Bled	Lwt quad sculls
Gold medal – first place	2016 Rotterdam	Lwt quad sculls
Silver medal – second place	2015 Aiguebelette	Lwt single sculls
European Championships
Gold medal – first place	2015 Poznań	Lwt single sculls
Bronze medal – third place	2012 Varese	Lwt double sculls
Bronze medal – third place	2014 Belgrade	Lwt double sculls
- Updated on 29 June 2018

Imogen Walsh (born 17 January 1984) is a British rower, a former World and European Champion in Lightweight Women's sculling.

== Biography ==
Walsh was born in Glasgow and joined Inverness Rowing Club in 1995 as a cox, only taking up rowing herself in 2003 as a student at Glasgow University.

She won gold in the lightweight women's quad at the 2011 World Rowing Championships in Bled. She was racing with Stephanie Cullen, Kathryn Twyman and Andrea Dennis.

She raced the 2013 season with Twyman in the lightweight doubles, with a second, third and fourth place in the World Cup races, coming fourth at the 2013 World Rowing Championships in Chungju. In October 2013, she won the Women's Wingfield Sculls race.

Walsh raced in the lightweight women's double scull with Kat Copeland throughout the 2014 Season. The duo first raced together for the European Championships in Belgrade where they won a bronze medal. At the second World Cup in Aiguebelette they won gold. Walsh and Copeland went on to retain their gold at the final World Cup in Lucerne. At the World Rowing Championships in Amsterdam Walsh and Copeland missed out on a place in the A Final, winning the B Final in a World's Best Time, albeit not for long, as this was broken again by a small margin in the A Final.

At the 2015 European Rowing Championships in Poznań, Poland, she won gold in the Lightweight Women's Single Scull after a close race with Sweden's Emma Fredh. She was part of the British team that topped the medal table at the 2015 World Rowing Championships at Lac d'Aiguebelette, France, she won a silver medal in the same discipline, beaten by New Zealand's Zoe McBride. At the 2016 World Rowing Championships in Rotterdam, Netherlands, she won a gold medal in the Lightweight Women's Quadruple Sculls with Brianna Stubbs, Emily Craig, and Eleanor Piggott.
