= Oxford University Lightweight Rowing Club =

British rowing club

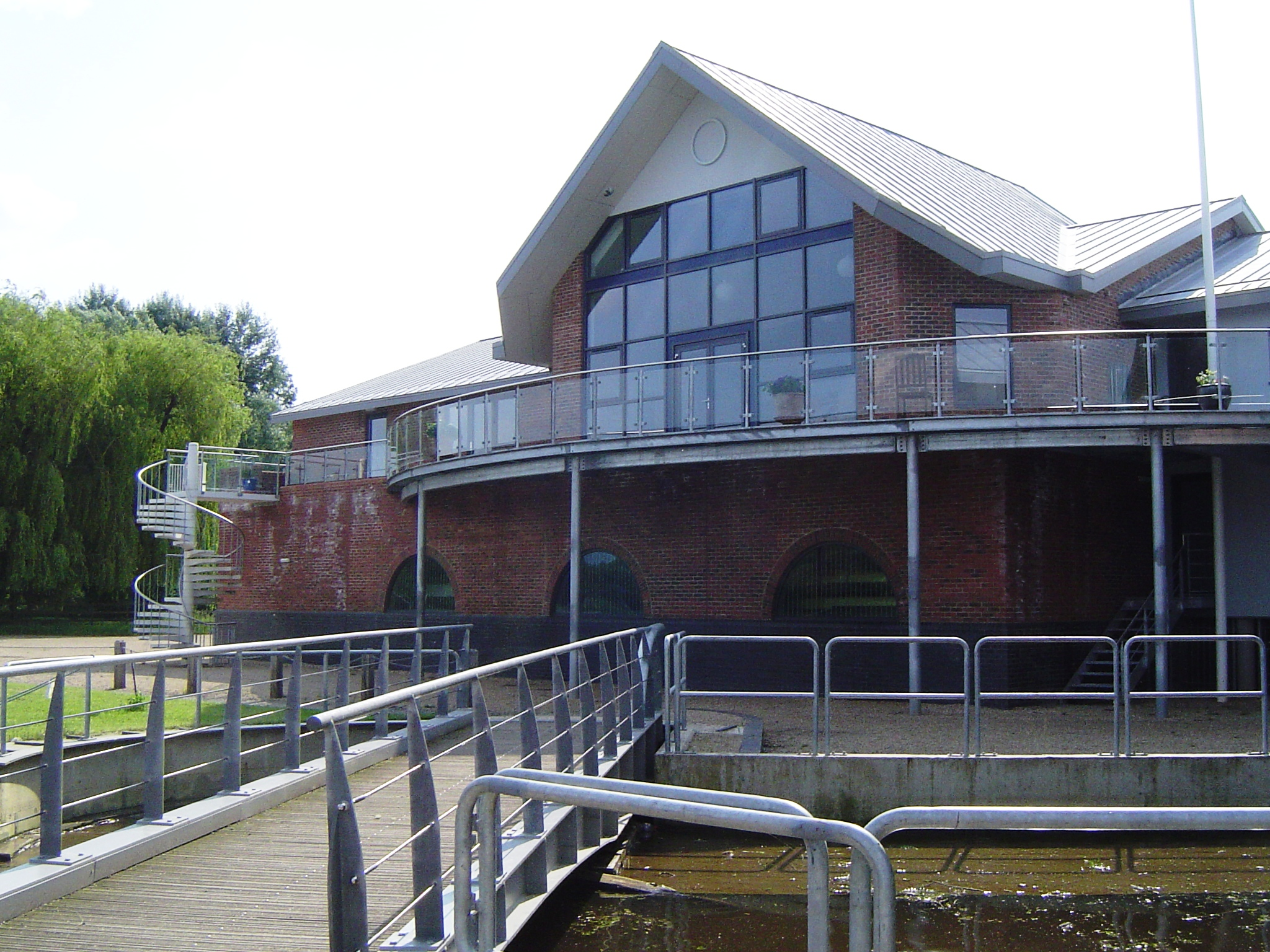
- Location: Wallingford, Oxford, (United Kingdom)
- Home water: River Thames
- Founded: 1975
- Key people: Matthew Hudson (President); Samuel Wells (Chief Coach)
- University: University of Oxford
- Affiliations: British Rowing
- Website: www.oulrc.org

Events
- Henley Boat Races

Notable members
- Paul Mattick

Oxford University Lightweight Rowing Club (OULRC) was the university rowing club for lightweight men at the University of Oxford which selected crews to race against Cambridge University Boat Club in the Lightweight Boat Races at the end of Hilary term. These races are usually held in late March each year.

In 2023, OULRC merged with OUBC, OUWBC and OUWLRC to form one Oxford University Boat Club.

== Membership and racing ==
Membership of OULRC was by competitive selection drawn solely from student members of the university. OULRC commenced the selection process in September prior to the beginning of Michaelmas term, recruiting from both undergraduate and postgraduate members of the University. By the end of Michaelmas, the squad was reduced to two trial eights which competed in a Trial Eights race in London over the course used for the race against Cambridge. From this squad the club selected a first crew, known as the Lightweight Blue Boat, and a reserve crew, known as Nephthys.

The Blue Boat went on to race Cambridge. From 2000 until 2006, Nephthys also raced against a lightweight reserve crew from Cambridge, Granta. From 2007, however, Cambridge declined to field a Granta crew, and Nephthys raced in the Head of the River Race and other external races. The squad also participated in BUCS championships.

Nephthys derives its name from the Egyptian goddess of the same name who was claimed to be the sister of Isis. Isis is the name given to the heavyweight reserve crew, and is also the term used within the university for the reach of the Thames between Osney lock and Iffley lock on which the college crews row. Although the Blue Boat did not compete in regattas after racing against Cambridge, OULRC did occasionally field crews in the Henley Royal Regatta, which often compete as Nephthys.

The Blue Boat crew had the right to wear a distinctive uniform. With lightweight rowing a full blue sport at Oxford, they wore an Oxford blue blazer with the club insignia on the chest pocket. Previously a half-blue sport, this replaced a blue and white striped blazer with OULRC embroidery or a blue blazer with white piping and embroidery worn in the early years of the club. Nephthys members wore a white blazer with blue piping, with crossed blades and the word Nephthys on the chest pocket.

== Organisation and history ==
The first Lightweight Boat Race was in 1975, and the first lightweight crew originally raced under the auspices of Oxford University Boat Club. OULRC was formed soon after. The management of the club was in the hands of an elected committee composed of students, although the day-to-day running was mainly in the hands of the president, who was elected by Blue Boat and Nephthys members each year. Like all Oxford University clubs, it also had a senior member, who is a university don.

Along with OUBC, OUWBC, and OUWLRC, OULRC was part of Oxford University Rowing Clubs which is the body that oversees all college rowing in Oxford.

=== 1987 mutiny ===
In 1987, at the time of the OUBC Mutiny, a similar dispute also arose in relation to the selection of the Lightweight Blue Boat. This dispute threatened the running of the 1987 race. The President, David Whittaker, who rowed the previous year, had lost a selection race against another rower, Sean Sinclair. As president, Whittaker claimed the right to select the crew against the recommendations of the coach, and former OUBC Blue, Rob Clay. The crew, in turn, refused to row with Whittaker in the boat. The matter was finally resolved when an extraordinary meeting was called and life members from London travelled up to Oxford to elect Bob Macdonald as president. Ironically, one of the American OUBC mutineers, Dan Lyons, was called in to assist in coaching the 1987 crew after the original coach, Rob Clay, was called out of retirement to stroke Isis.

== Facilities and training ==
For much of its history, OULRC trained outside of Oxford, variously at Radley (downstream) and at Godstow (upstream). From 2007, OULRC was based at the Fleming Boat House at Wallingford alongside OUBC.

== Past Crews ==
This is a list of the OULRC / OUBC crews who raced the Men's Lightweight Boat Race against Cambridge.

Date	Result	Winning time	Winning margin (lengths)	Crew (rowers are listed left to right in boat position from bow to stroke, followed by the cox)
1975	Lost			J. Simpson, C.R Birrell, M. Taylor, J. Britton, A. Ball, N.W Hunt, J.S Thompson, K.I.M Beddall, C. Darrell
1976	Won			Rob Warren, Alastair Watson, Ben Heywood-Smith, Chris Jones, Sam Menefee, Pete Evans, Adrian Ball, Gordon Woods, Chris Alwright
1977	Won			Mark Atkinson, Pete Smith, Mike Ridley, Dave Bean, Sam Menefee, Tim Leitzke, Mark Gleave, Gordon Woods, Jim Baker
1978	Lost	5:48	2/3	John Chadwick, Bob Maguire, Sam Menefee, Rob Johnson, Adrian Ball, Bill Baker, John Bell, Al Watson, S.W Orme
1979	Lost	5.39	2/3	Julian Bickersteth, Bob Maguire, Dan Harvey, Rod Thomas, Fergus Fleming, John Rawlinson, Christopher Ainsley, Ian Schofield, John Baker
1980	Lost		2	C. Samuel, S. Charles, R. Zeghibe, R. Porfilio, C. Marcam, N. Jordan, P. Allen, M. Tyndall, S. Higgins
1981	Lost		Canvas	N. Martin, J.D.F Coombe, A.P Bunting, C.R.F Tidmarsh, R.F Hamlin, N.C Robertson, N.D Powell, M.L Richards, M.G Rowan
1982	Lost		1/3	A.C.M Gane, M.J Henderson, K.D Palithrope, G.J Davies, N.J Edison, B.K Thompson, D. Ornadel, C.R.F Tidmarsh, G.S Topping
1983	Lost	6:53	3	Anu Dudhia, David Foster, Simon Mills, Ian Tatchell, Paul Castle, Geraint Davies, Nick Martin, Richard Morgan, John Brann
1984	Lost		1 1/3	A. Dudhia, A.J Bird, D.P Behan, T. Anderson, S.P Lowis, J.C Thompson, A.W Boyle, D.J Foster, L.J Clare
1985	Lost		Canvas	Alexander Bird, Simon Jones, David Wilson, David Whitaker, David Foster, Angus Bogle, David Boulter, Ian Robson, Juan Sabater
1986	Lost		2	J.P Varwell Rendle, Jim Hawkins, Gavin Watters, David Whitaker, Andy Booth, Andrew Tuberfield, Jim Kirwan, Angus Bogle, Neal Tebbutt
1987	Lost	6:09	1/2	Phil Hollows, James MacDonald, Brian Smith, Malachy Smith, Bob MacDonald, Graham Lidell, Jonathon Pink, Sean Sinclair, William O'Chee
1988	Lost			P. Rudd, A. McJannet, J. Morris, T. Knight, D. Busvine, A.Smith, G. Crocker, J. Nimmo, P. Drew
1989	Lost	5:51	4 1/2	P. Nicklin, A. Smith, N. Taylor, R. Smalman-Smith, G. Crocker, S. King, P. Thomas, J. Lane, D. Horner
1990	Lost	6:40	4 3/4	J. Batt, T. Ceccarelli, D. Long, N. Blaydes, G. Crocker, A. Beale, P. Thomas, L. Howard, Hilary Norris
1991	Lost	6:39	1/3	S. Liddle, V. Mayadas, S. Kenyon, T. Waters, R. Bates, L. Howard, A. Ferguson, D. Neary, E. Chick
1992	Won	5:40	2 1/2	Paddy Gillespie, Luke Howard, Steve Grant, Steve Brown, Paul Thomas, Chris Hobbs, Dan Wood, Tim Waters, Rabin Tambyraja
1993	Lost	5:39	1/2	M. Lauder, R. Daron Smith, E. Mark Anderson, O. Kingsbury, I. Harding, S.P Brown, J. Milward, D. Emes, Hilary Norris
1994	Won	5:35	3/4	M. Giles, D. Smith, M. Lauder, O. Kingsbury, L. Howard, P. Thomas, J. Milward, R. Weeks
1995	Lost	5:29	1/3	Dave Lindgren, Alex Skinner, James Bailey, David Bridges, Christian Schoof, Pete Bance, Jonathon Hall, Will Wadsworth, Leila Hudson
1996	Won	NRO disq		Nathan Tamblyn, Marc Bleeze, Stephen Wooton, Pete Richens, Pete Bellenger, Jon Watkinson, Paul Bollyky, Ollie Kingsbury, Leila Hudson
1997	Won	5:49	1	Dan Brocklebank, Alistair Chirnside, Henry Byam-Cook, Ollie Kingsbury, Richard Jackson, Charlie Perkins, Alexander Van Tulleken, Christoffer Van Tulleken, Leila Hudson
1998	Lost	5:45	1/2	Neil Archibald, George Aitken-Davies, Jonathon Watkinson, Ben Grout, William Wagner, Charlie Heise, George Pounder, Piers Gatenby, Bethan Bell
1999	Won	5:31	1 1/2	Matt Wicks, Richard Catlin, Jon Watkinson, Richard Todd, Pete Catalino, Ben Brookes, Alexander Van Tulleken, Christoffer Van Tulleen, Ruth Holtham
2000	Lost	5:40	2	Alex Eggman, Richard Law, Hugh Wright, Richard Catlin, Raman Nanda, James Benson, Jeremy Fagan, James Backhouse, Ben Crystal
2001	Lost	6:33	4	Justin Gill, Andrew Karmy, Ben Bowles, Paul Banham, Patrick Bamber, Hugh Wright, Ashley Hulme, Nick McSloy, Meghan O'Brien
2002	Won	5:21	2	Mike Bull, Ed Biden, Dieter Dijkstra, Will Mulholland, Tankred Finke, Richard Catlin, Andrew Roberts, Ewan Davis, Nicola Gust
2003	Won	5:55	1 1/4	Dave Allen, Jonny Taylor, Simon Risoe, Ed Biden, Tankred Finke, Peter Ralph, Alex Hammacher, Ewan Davis, Jeni Tod
2004	Won	5:36	1/2	Justin Accomando, Mark Baillie, Alex Eggeman, Jake Goodman, Richard Godfrey, Neal West, Alex Hammacher, Ewan Davies, Jeni Tod
2005	Won	5:51	3	Bradley Hull, Aaron Espin, John Todd, Graeme Murray, Alexander Woods, Andrew Berridge, Michael Dolan, James Newman, Esther Hobson
April 1, 2006	Won	5:18	2 1/4	Christopher Cole, Gareth Jones, Graeme Murray, James Stanier, Andrew Berridge, Hugh Mortimer, Graham Davies, Alexander Woods, Phillip Clausen-Thue
April 1, 2007	Won	3:44	1	Oliver Lough, Bradley Hull, Peter Smith, Henry Sheldon, Oisin McNeela, Tom Cassidy, Louis Rooney, James Solly, Patrick Yu
March 23, 2008	Won	6:15	2 1/2	Bradley Hull, Simon Janes, Andy McGrath, Will Canestaro, Thomas Harvey, Bodo Schulenberg, Henry Sheldon, Ben Harrop-Griffiths, Colin Groshong
March 22, 2009	Lost	5:49	3	Peter Nordberg, Alex Simmons, Kevin Cunningham, Joe Sadowski, Jonny Coppel, Ben Harrop-Griffiths, Dan Harvey, Lewis Roberts, Tom Hosking
March 28, 2010	Lost	5:28	2 ft	Martin Henstridge, Tom Roberts, Paul Crewe, Joe Sadowski, Bodo Schulenberg, Matt Neve, Dan Harvey, Lewis Roberts, Ruth Barber
March 27, 2011	Won	5:54	Canvas	Paul Crewe, Jakub Kwiecinski, John Kiely, Oliver Dicks, Samuel Albanie, Bodo Schulenberg, Chris Gamble, Andrew Craig, Jack Carlson
March 25, 2012	Lost	6:00	3/4	Richard Watson, Edward Lent, Jasper Warner, James Thom, Till Hackler, Till Wirth, Benjamin Walpole, Tyler Spencer, Victoria Stulgis
March 24, 2013	Won	6:49	1 2/3	James Kirkbride, Benjamin Bronselaer, Kier Macdonald, Frederick Foster, Jasper Warner, Benjamin Walpole, Andrew Sayce, Max Dillon, Christian Proctor
March 30, 2014	Lost	5:30	3 1/2	Dan Bowen, David Zimmer, Marcus Henglein, Robert Leonard, James Ellison, Rowan Arthur, Andrew Saul, Matt Kerin, Hannah Keenan
April 5, 2015	Lost	5:55	4 feet	Jack Shuttleworth, Sooraj Mahesh, Alec Trigger, Andrew Saul, Rowan Arthur, Edward Stace, Edward Rees, Robin Veale, Thomas Clode
March 19, 2016	Lost	6:19	Easily	Frederick Hamilton, Alexander Pavitt, Arturo Villanueva, Alec Trigger*, Aidan Walker, Graham Baird, Henry Smith, Alexander Rowe-Jones, Joanna Brown
March 26, 2017	Lost	6:07	1 3/4	Tom Schwantje, Henry Smith, George Watkinson, Alexander Pavitt, Rowan Arthur*, Sooraj Mahesh, Alexander Miles, Douglas Chesterton, Caroline Roden
March 19, 2018	Lost	6:26	1/3	Roman Girn, Alexander Rowe-Jones, Agamemnon Crumpton, Sooraj Mahesh, Jonathon Martin, Dr Iain McGurgan, Alexander Pavitt, Dan Bowen, Dhaval Desai
March 23, 2019	Won	17:44	2 1/4	Tom Schwantje, Dr Iain McGurgan, Jan Ole Ernst, Henry Smith, Nick Ryan, Dr Sooraj Mahesh*, Arthur Arnould, Douglas Chesterton, Frankie Satchwell
March 15, 2020	Won	18:50	3 1/2	Agamemnon Crumpton, Arthur Arnould*, Harrison Kieffer, Ed Lamb, Jan Ole Ernst, Nick Ryan, Tom Schwantje, Matthew Hamilton, Chloe Tubman
May 23, 2021	Won	14:19	1 1/2	Ed Campbell, Daniel Craig-McFeely, Harrison Kieffer, Ben de Jager, Nick Ryan, Agamemnon Crumpton, Edmund Mortimer, Ed Lamb*, Cici Hong
March 20, 2022	Lost	18:01	5	Olly Featherstone, Agamemnon Crumpton, Harrison Kieffer, Matthew Hudson*, James Halsall, Nick Ryan, Ed Campbell, Alex Wythe, Rollo Orme
March 20, 2023	Lost	18:17	11	Zac Abel*, Harrison Kieffer, Alec Berry, Samuel Baker, Adam Pattenden, Olly Featherstone, Matthew Hudson, Agamemnon Crumpton, Rollo Orme
March 29, 2024	Lost	20:15	5.5	Alex Abel, Noah Pingul, Dylan Dissanayake, James Mason, Dylan John, Luca Nadig, Adam Pattenden, Isaac Throsby, Rahul Marchand

(*) denotes President of the Oxford University Lightweight Rowing Club

== See also ==
- Oxford University Boat Club
- Oxford University Women's Lightweight Rowing Club
