= Kathryn Twyman =

British and Canadian rower (born 1987)

Personal information
- Nationality: Canadian
- Born: 29 March 1987 (age 39)
Medal record
Women's rowing
Representing Great Britain
World Rowing Championships
Gold medal – first place	2011 Bled	LW4x

Kathyrn Twyman (born 29 March 1987) is a British and Canadian rower. She was part of the British squad that topped the medal table at the 2011 World Rowing Championships in Bled, where she won a gold medal as part of the lightweight quad sculls with Imogen Walsh, Stephanie Cullen and Andrea Dennis.
