= The Lightweight Boat Races =

Annual rowing races on the River Thames

Event information
- Race area: The Championship Course; Formerly Henley Regatta course (downstream)
- Dates: 1975–present
- Competitors: CUBC (formerly CULRC / CUWBC), OUBC (formerly OULRC / OUWLRC)
- Distance: 4.2 miles (6.8 km)
- First race: 1975 (men), 1984 (women)
- Website: www.theboatrace.org//

The Lightweight Boat Races are a series of annual rowing races between men's and women's lightweight crews representing the University of Oxford and the University of Cambridge.

The first men's race took place in 1975, being joined by the women's race in 1984. Both races are currently held on the 4.2-mile (6.8 km) Championship Course from Putney to Mortlake, although they previously formed part of the Henley Boat Races, along with various other rowing races between the two universities, including the openweight women's Boat Race. Members of both teams are traditionally known as blues or half blues and each boat as a Blue Boat. Competitors at the events have gone on to compete at international and Olympic levels.

== History ==
Richard Bates, a Cambridge undergraduate, organised a Boat Race between lightweight men's crews of Oxford and Cambridge universities in 1975, to take place at Henley-on-Thames. The race was joined by the openweight women's Boat Race two years later, thus forming the Henley Boat Races. The first lightweight women's boat race took place at the event in 1984. Reserve races have taken place since 2000 (except 2010–2015) for the lightweight men (Nephthys vs Granta) and in some years since 2012 for the lightweight women (Tethys vs CUWBC Lightweight Reserves).

In 2019, the lightweight men's race moved to the Championship Course from Putney to Mortlake, where it has been held since. The lightweight women's race made the same move the following year in 2020.

For the men's race the average weight of the crew must not exceed 70 kilograms (154.3 lb; 11 st 0.3 lb), with no rower weighing over 72.5 kilograms (159.8 lb; 11 st 5.8 lb). For the women's race, no rower can exceed 59 kilograms (130.1 lb; 9 st 4.1 lb).

The races receive annual press coverage, and competitors from both Universities have gone on to compete at international and Olympic levels.

== Results ==
The results of the races are as follows.

=== Lightweight Men's Boat Race ===
- Cambridge: 33 wins
- Oxford: 19 wins

No.	Date	Winner	Time	Winning Margin (Lengths)	Oxford Wins	Cambridge Wins
1	1975	Cambridge	6:18		-	1
2	1976	Oxford	6:32		1	1
3	1977	Oxford	6:19	1	2	1
4	1978	Cambridge	5.48	2/3	2	2
5	1979	Cambridge	5.39	2/3	2	3
6	1980	Cambridge	6:15		2	4
7	1981	Cambridge	6:21		2	5
8	1982	Cambridge	NTT		2	6
9	1983	Cambridge	5:53		2	7
10	1984	Cambridge	5:40	1 1/3	2	8
11	1985	Cambridge	6:00	6 ft	2	9
12	1986	Cambridge	6:24	2	2	10
13	1987	Cambridge	6:09	1/2	2	11
14	1988	Cambridge	5:50		2	12
15	1989	Cambridge	5:51	4 1/2	2	13
16	1990	Cambridge	6:40	4 3/4	2	14
17	1991	Cambridge	6:39	1/3	2	15
18	1992	Oxford	5:40	2 1/2	3	15
19	1993	Cambridge	5:39	1/2	3	16
20	1994	Oxford	5:35	3/4	4	16
21	1995	Cambridge	5:29	1/3	4	17
22	1996	Oxford	NRO disq		5	17
23	1997	Oxford	5:49	1	6	17
24	1998	Cambridge	5:45	1/2	6	18
25	1999	Oxford	5:31	1 1/2	7	18
26	2000	Cambridge	5:40	2	7	19
27	2001	Cambridge	6:33	4 (raced at Holme Pierrepont)	7	20
28	2002	Oxford	5:21	2	8	20
29	2003	Oxford	5:55	1 1/4	9	20
30	2004	Oxford	5:36	1/2	10	20
31	2005	Oxford	5:51	3	11	20
32	1 April 2006	Oxford	5:18	2 1/4	12	20
33	1 April 2007	Oxford	3:44	1 (raced over a shortened course)	13	20
34	23 March 2008	Oxford	6:15	2 1/2	14	20
35	22 March 2009	Cambridge	5:49	3	14	21
36	28 March 2010	Cambridge	5:28	2 ft	14	22
37	27 March 2011	Oxford	5:54	Canvas	15	22
38	25 March 2012	Cambridge	6:00	3/4	15	23
39	24 March 2013	Oxford	6:49	1 2/3 (raced at Dorney)	16	23
40	30 March 2014	Cambridge	5:30	3 1/2	16	24
41	5 April 2015	Cambridge	5:55	4 ft	16	25
42	19 March 2016	Cambridge	6:19	Easily	16	26
43	26 March 2017	Cambridge	6:07	1 3/4	16	27
44	18 March 2018	Cambridge	6:26	1/3 (raced at Dorney)	16	28
45	24 March 2019	Oxford	17:43	2 1/3 (first race on the Tideway)	17	28
46	15 March 2020	Oxford	18:50	3 1/2	18	28
47	23 May 2021	Oxford	14:19	1 1/2 (raced at Ely)	19	28
48	20 March 2022	Cambridge	18:01	5	19	29
49	20 March 2023	Cambridge	18:18	11	19	30
50	29 March 2024	Cambridge	20:15	5 1/2	19	31
51	12 April 2025	Cambridge	17:34	4 1/2	19	32
52	3 April 2026	Cambridge	18:33	7	19	33

=== Lightweight Women's Boat Race ===
- Cambridge: 25 wins
- Oxford: 17 wins

No.	Date	Winner	Time	Winning Margin (Lengths)	Oxford Wins	Cambridge Wins
1	1984	Cambridge			-	1
2	1985	Cambridge			-	2
3	1986	Oxford			1	2
4	1987	Cambridge			1	3
5	1988	Cambridge	5:50	3	1	4
6	1989	Cambridge	6:37	1	1	5
7	1990	Cambridge	7:35	2 1/3	1	6
8	1991	Cambridge	7:48	2 1/4	1	7
9	1992	Cambridge	6:35	3	1	8
10	1993	Cambridge	6:18	Easily	1	9
11	1994	Cambridge	6:23	1 ft.	1	10
12	1995	Oxford	6:19	2	2	10
13	1996	Cambridge	6:36	Canvas	2	11
14	1997	Cambridge	6:37	Canvas	2	12
15	1998	Oxford	6:36	Canvas	3	12
16	1999	Oxford	6:01 1/2	2 3/4	4	12
17	2000	Oxford	6:22	2 1/2	5	12
18	2001	Cambridge	7:37	3 (raced at Holme Pierrepont)	5	13
19	2002	Oxford	6:06	4	6	13
20	2003	Oxford	6:51	2	7	13
21	2004	Oxford	6:08	3/4	8	13
22	2005	Oxford	6:55	1/2	9	13
23	1 April 2006	Cambridge	6:00	Canvas	9	14
24	1 April 2007	Oxford	4:11	1 (raced over a shortened course)	10	14
25	23 March 2008	Cambridge	7:01	1/3	10	15
26	22 March 2009	Oxford	6:30	2 1/2	11	15
27	28 March 2010	Oxford	6:01	2 3/4	12	15
28	27 March 2011	Cambridge	6:43	1 1/2	12	16
29	25 March 2012	Oxford	6:48	1 1/3	13	16
30	24 March 2013	Oxford	7:33	4 3/4 (raced at Dorney)	14	16
31	29 March 2014	Oxford	6:08	3 1/2	15	16
32	5 April 2015	Cambridge	6:26	3 ft.	15	17
33	19 March 2016	Oxford	6:54	Canvas	16	17
34	26 March 2017	Cambridge	6:45	3	16	18
35	18 March 2018	Cambridge	7:24	1/2 (raced at Dorney)	16	19
36	30 March 2019	Oxford	6:28	2 1/2	17	19
37	15 March 2020	Cambridge	23:24	6 (first race on the Tideway)	17	20
38	18 May 2021	Cambridge	18:08	2 1/2 (raced at Ely)	17	21
39	20 March 2022	Cambridge	19:59	15	17	22
40	20 March 2023	Cambridge	23:34	6	17	23
41	29 March 2024	Cambridge	23:04	5	17	24
42	12 April 2025	Cambridge	19:08	3	17	25

=== Lightweight Men's Reserves (Nephthys vs Granta) ===
- Oxford: 11 wins (inc. 3 R/O)
- Cambridge: 10 wins

Date	Winner	Time	Winning Margin (Lengths)	Oxford Wins	Cambridge Wins
2000	Cambridge	5:50	2 3/4	-	1
2001	Oxford	7	1/2	1	1
2002	Oxford	5:33	2	2	1
2003	Cambridge	6:19	2 1/2	2	2
2004	Oxford	5:45	Canvas	3	2
2005	Oxford	6:07	4 1/2	4	2
1 April 2006	Oxford	5:26	5	5	2
1 April 2007	Oxford	4:08	R/O due to no Cambridge crew. Lost to Old Boys.	6	2
23 March 2008	Oxford	6:29	R/O due to no Cambridge crew. Lost to Old Boys.	7	2
22 March 2009	Oxford	6:15	R/O due to no Cambridge crew. Beat Durham.	8	2
			Race in abeyance 2010 - 2015		
13 March 2016	Cambridge	-	1 1/4 (Raced in 4x)	8	3
19 March 2017	Cambridge	6:19	2 1/2 (Raced in 8+)	8	4
18 March 2018	Cambridge	7:24	3/4 (Raced in 4+ at Dorney)	8	5
22 March 2019	Oxford		1 (Raced in 2– from Putney to Mile Post)	9	5
14 March 2020	Oxford		Canvas (Raced in 2- from Putney to Mile Post)	10	5
23 May 2021	Oxford		1 (Raced in 2- at Ely)	11	5
18 March 2022	Cambridge		2 (Raced in 2- from Putney to Mile Post)	11	6
18 March 2023	Cambridge		5 (Raced in 2- from Harrods to Putney)	11	7
27 March 2024	Cambridge		4 (Raced in 2- from Putney to Mile Post)	11	8
10 April 2025	Cambridge		Easily (Raced in 2- from Putney to Mile Post)	11	9
31 March 2026	Cambridge		16 (Raced in 2- from Mile Post to Putney)	11	10

=== Lightweight Women's Reserves (Tethys vs CUBC Lightweight Women's Reserves) ===
- Cambridge: 5
- Oxford: 2

Raced on the Friday before the main event in a 4+ in 2012, and incorporated into main race day in 2016.

Date	Winner	Time	Winning Margin (Lengths)	Oxford Wins	Cambridge Wins
2012	Cambridge		(Raced in 4+, CUBC had open weight rowers who did not weigh-in, OUWLRC had a lightweight crew)	-	1
19 March 2016	Cambridge	8:55	3/4 (Raced in 2-)	-	2
26 March 2017	Cambridge		easily (Raced in 2-)	-	3
18 March 2018	Oxford	8:15	easily (Raced in 4+ at Dorney)	1	3
30 March 2019	Cambridge		1 1/2 (Raced in 2-)	1	4
14 March 2020	Oxford		7 (Raced in 4+ from Putney to Hammersmith)	2	4
18 May 2021	Cambridge		Oxford unable to field a crew	2	5
19 March 2022	Oxford		Cambridge unable field a crew	3	5
18 March 2023	Cambridge		3 (Raced in 4+ from Harrods to Putney, CUBC boat had 3 openweight rowers who did not weigh-in)	3	6

== See also ==
- The Boat Race
- Henley Boat Races
- List of British and Irish varsity matches
