= Oxford University Women's Lightweight Rowing Club =

British rowing club

- Location: Wallingford, Oxford, UK
- Home water: River Thames
- Founded: 1984
- Key people: Victoria K.J. Fletcher (President); Grace Davison (Social Secretary)
- University: University of Oxford
- Affiliations: British Rowing
- Website: www.ouwlrc.org.uk

Events
- The Lightweight Boat Races

Notable members
- Roz Savage, Anna Corderoy, Jen Goldsack

Results
Representing Great Britain
EUSA Championships
Bronze medal – third place	2016 Zagreb	4x
Bronze medal – third place	2010 Amsterdam	8+
Representing Oxford
BUCS Championships
Silver medal – second place	2016 BUCS Regatta	WLwt 8+
Bronze medal – third place	2016 BUCS Regatta	WLwt 4-
Bronze medal – third place	2016 BUCS Regatta	WLwt 4x
Gold medal – first place	2015 BUCS Regatta	WLwt 8+
Silver medal – second place	2015 BUCS Regatta	WLwt 4-
Silver medal – second place	2015 BUCS Regatta	WLwt 4x
Silver medal – second place	2013 BUCS Regatta	WLwt 4-
Bronze medal – third place	2013 BUCS Regatta	WLwt 2-
Gold medal – first place	2010 BUCS Regatta	WLwt 8+
Gold medal – first place	2010 BUCS Regatta	WLwt 4-
Gold medal – first place	2010 BUCS Regatta	WLwt 4x
Silver medal – second place	2007 BUSA Regatta	WLwt 2-
Gold medal – first place	2006 BUSA Regatta	WLwt 8+
Silver medal – second place	2006 BUSA Regatta	WLwt 4-
Gold medal – first place	2006 BUSA Regatta	WLwt 2-

The Oxford University Women's Lightweight Rowing Club was a rowing club established in 1984 to represent the University of Oxford in the race against the Cambridge University Boat Club at the Lightweight Boat Races. Throughout the season, the Club races as Tethys Boat Club.

Membership of the rowing club was open to all female student members of the university who qualify as lightweight. Lightweight rowing for women details a maximum weight of 59 kg per athlete, with an average weight of 57 kg across the crew. This is a requirement for competition and for entry into the lightweight squad.

The club trained out of the Fleming Boathouse in Wallingford, alongside the other university squads. The club also used the facilities at the university's Iffley Road Sports Centre.

In 2023, OUWLRC was dissolved as a part of a merger between the various rowing clubs that represent Oxford at a university Level into one Oxford University Boat Club.

== Racing ==
The key race in the club's year was The Lightweight Boat Races against Cambridge on the Championship Course in London. The club also competes at national head races and regattas. In particular, the club regularly competes at the British Universities and Colleges Sport Regatta. In 2016, it won silver medal in the 8+ and bronze in the 4-. categories The club also competes at an international level, recording a latest achievement with a bronze with 4x- in Zagreb in July 2016.

== Honours ==
=== British champions ===
Year	Winning crew/s
1987	Women 4+

== See also ==
- Oxford–Cambridge rivalry
- University rowing (UK)
- Women's rowing
