= Cambridge University Boat Club =

Rowing club of the University of Cambridge

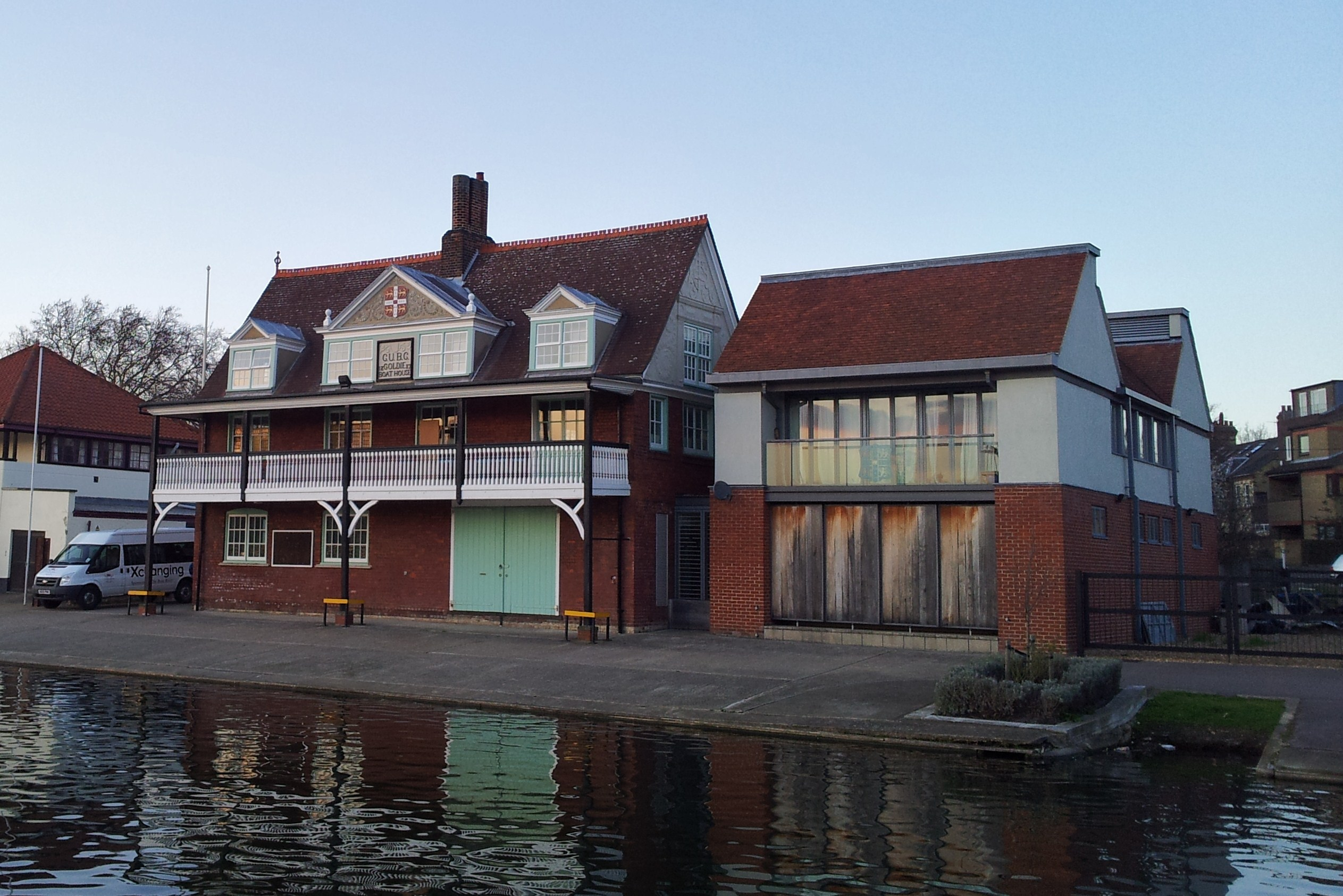

- Location: Cambridge, England
- Coordinates: 52°12′40.2″N 0°7′50.5″E
- Home water: River Cam and River Great Ouse
- Founded: 1828
- Key people: Simon Hatcher (Men's President); Eloise Etherington (Women's President); Archie Smith (Lightweight Men's President); Lauren Allegretti (Lightweight Women's President); Rob Baker (Men's Chief Coach); Patrick Ryan (Women's Chief Coach); Stephen Peel(Chair)
- Affiliations: British Rowing
- Website: cubc.org.uk

Events
- The Boat Race; Head of the River Race; Head of the River Fours

Notable members
- Chris Baillieu; John Goldie; Tom James; Hugh Laurie; Tom Ransley; George Nash

The Cambridge University Boat Club (CUBC) is the rowing club of the University of Cambridge, England. The club was founded in 1828 and has been located at the Goldie Boathouse on the River Cam, Cambridge since 1882. Nowadays, training primarily takes place on the River Great Ouse at Ely.

The prime constitutional aim of CUBC is to beat Oxford University Boat Club in the annual Oxford and Cambridge Boat Race and Lightweight Boat Races. CUBC's Openweight Men's squad currently lead Oxford in the series by 87 races to 81, with 1 dead heat in The Boat Race 1877, while the Openweight Women's squad lead Oxford by 48 races to 30. The Lightweight Men's squad lead Oxford by 31 races to 19, and the Lightweight Women's squad lead Oxford by 24 races to 17.

== History ==
The inaugural meeting of Cambridge University Boat Club took place at Gonville and Caius College on 9 December 1828. Following this meeting, it was agreed that a challenge be sent to the University of Oxford to organise a race between representatives of the two universities. A letter was sent to Oxford in which they were challenged "to row a match at or near London, each in an eight-oared boat during the ensuing Easter vacation". Consequently, the first Boat Race took place at Henley-on-Thames in June 1829.

The first Women's Boat Race was raced in 1927 on the Isis at Oxford, Cambridge was represented by a crew from Newnham College in front of hostile crowds. They were later joined by students from Girton College to form CUWBC for the 1941 Boat Race. CULRC was formed in 1974 to provide a lightweight crew to race OULRC in the first Lightweight Boat Race in 1975. In 1984 CUWBC fielded a lightweight women's crew for the first Lightweight Women's Boat Race at Henley. These races remained in Henley until the Women's Boat Race moved to the Championship course in London in 2015, followed by the Men's Lightweight Boat Race in 2019 and the Women's Lightweight Boat Race in 2020.

CUBC was one of five clubs which retained the right until 2012 to appoint representatives to the Council of British Rowing. The others were Leander Club, London Rowing Club, Thames Rowing Club and Oxford University Boat Club.

On 1 August 2020, CUBC formally merged with Cambridge University Women's Boat Club and Cambridge University Lightweight Rowing Club to form a new combined club to compete against Oxford clubs in the annual boat races. This followed a vote in April 2020 by members of all three clubs which was overwhelmingly in favour of the merger. The merger and subsequent rebrand led to a new visual identity for Cambridge University Boat Club. The new logo kept the old colours of red and black, but added yellow, the traditional team kit colour of the men’s and women’s reserve crews, Goldie and Blondie.

== Notability ==
CUBC has produced numerous Olympic-level rowers in its history. During the Boat Race period both the Men's Blue Boat and Goldie crews boat from King's College School's Boat House on the Putney embankment while the Women's Blue Boat and Blondie crews boat from Thames Rowing Club. During the Lightweight Boat Race period, CUBC Lightweight Men boat from London Rowing Club and Lightweight Women boat from Thames Rowing Club.

== Honours ==
=== British champions ===
| Year | Winning crew/s |
|---|---|
| 1972 | Men 2+ |
| 1973 | Men 2x |
| 1980 | Women 8+ |
| 1984 | Men 2-, Women 8+ |
| 1986 | Women 8+ |
| 1989 | Men Lightweight 8+, Men Lightweight 4x (Goldie) |
| 1990 | Women 8+ |
| 1991 | Men 4- (Goldie), Women 8+ |
| 1992 | Men 4- (Goldie) |
| 1993 | Women 8+ |
| 1997 | Men 4- |
| 2002 | Men Lightweight 4x, Men U23 1x |
| 2003 | Women 4- |
| 2016 | Men 4- |
| 2018 | Men 4- (Goldie), Women 4- |
| 2024 | Women club 4+, Women club 8+ |

Key = 2, 4, 8 (crew size), x (sculls), - (coxless), + (coxed)

=== Henley Royal Regatta ===
| Year | Races won |
|---|---|
| 1845 | Grand Challenge Cup |
| 1851 | Stewards' Challenge Cup |
| 1855 | Grand Challenge Cup |
| 1858 | Grand Challenge Cup |
| 1888 | Silver Goblets |
| 1889 | Silver Goblets |
| 1973 | Double Sculls Challenge Cup |
| 1984 | Silver Goblets & Nickalls' Challenge Cup |
| 1991 | Visitors' Challenge Cup (Goldie) |
| 1992 | Silver Goblets & Nickalls' Challenge Cup, Britannia Challenge Cup (Goldie) |
| 1995 | Stewards' Challenge Cup |
| 1996 | Ladies' Challenge Plate (Goldie) |
| 1997 | Temple Challenge Cup (Goldie) |
| 1999 | Ladies' Challenge Plate, Temple Challenge Cup |
| 2000 | Britannia Challenge Cup |
| 2003 | Britannia Challenge Cup (Goldie) |
| 2005 | Ladies' Challenge Plate |
| 2008 | Stewards' Challenge Cup |
| 2018 | Princess Grace Challenge Cup |
| 2019 | Visitors' Challenge Cup |
| 2021 | Stonor Challenge Trophy |
| 2026 | Temple Challenge Cup |

== Gallery ==
Anxious wait at the start of the 2007 Boat Race.

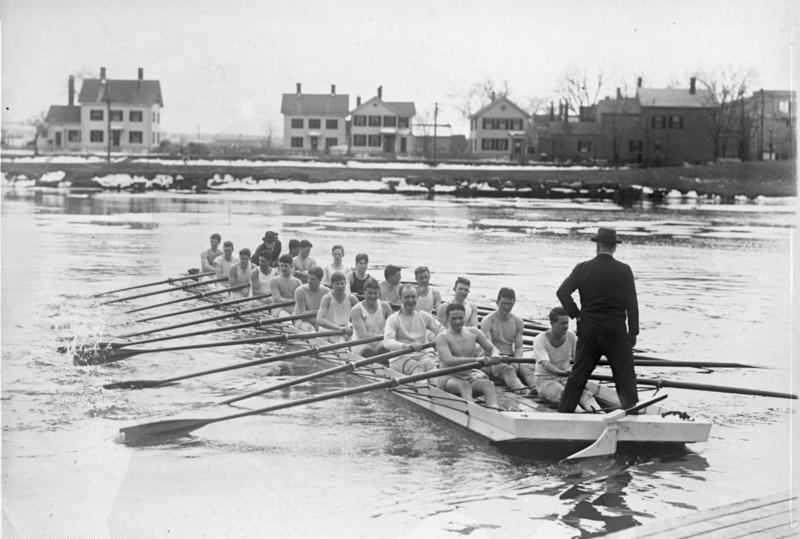
Winter Training in a 20-man boat, 1931

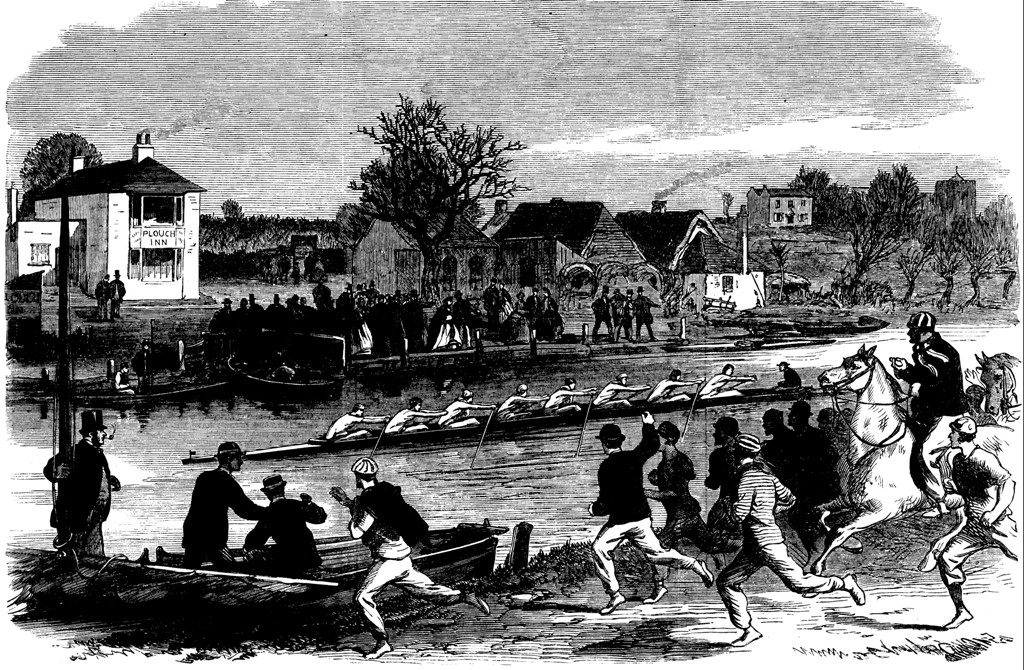
Coach on Horseback, 1866

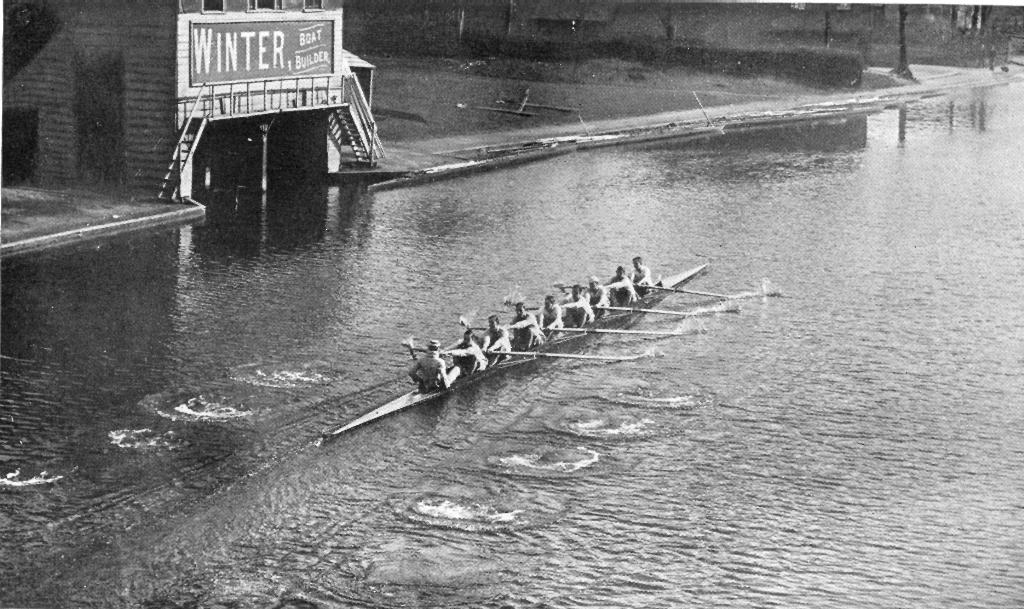
CUBC practising in 1899

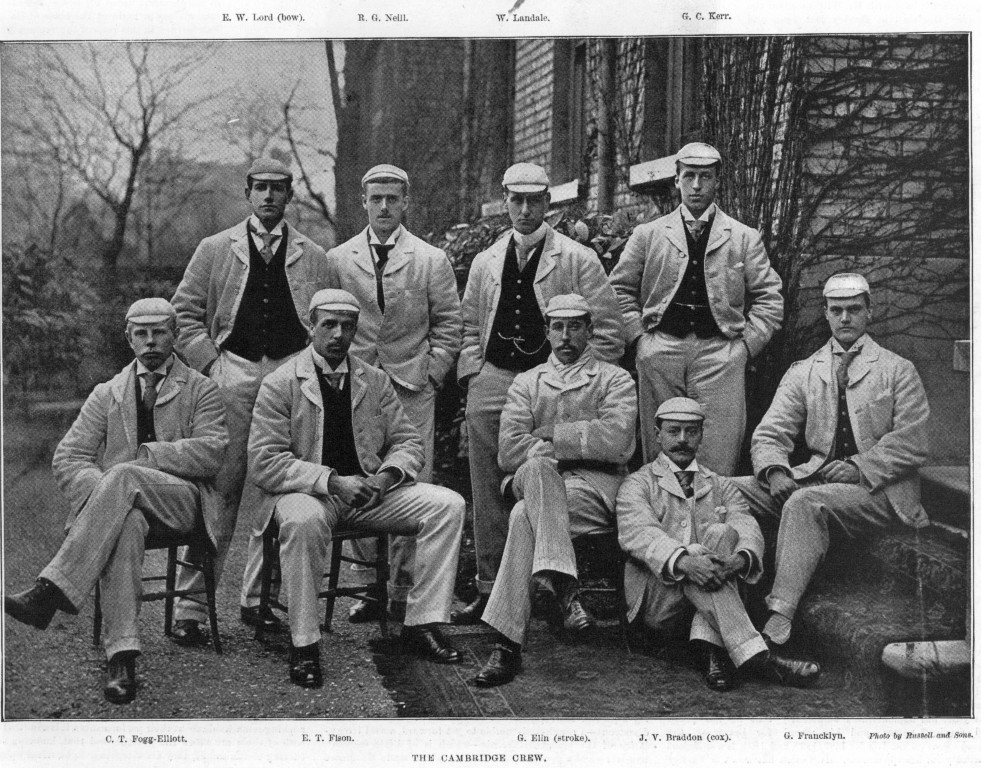
CUBC crew in 1892

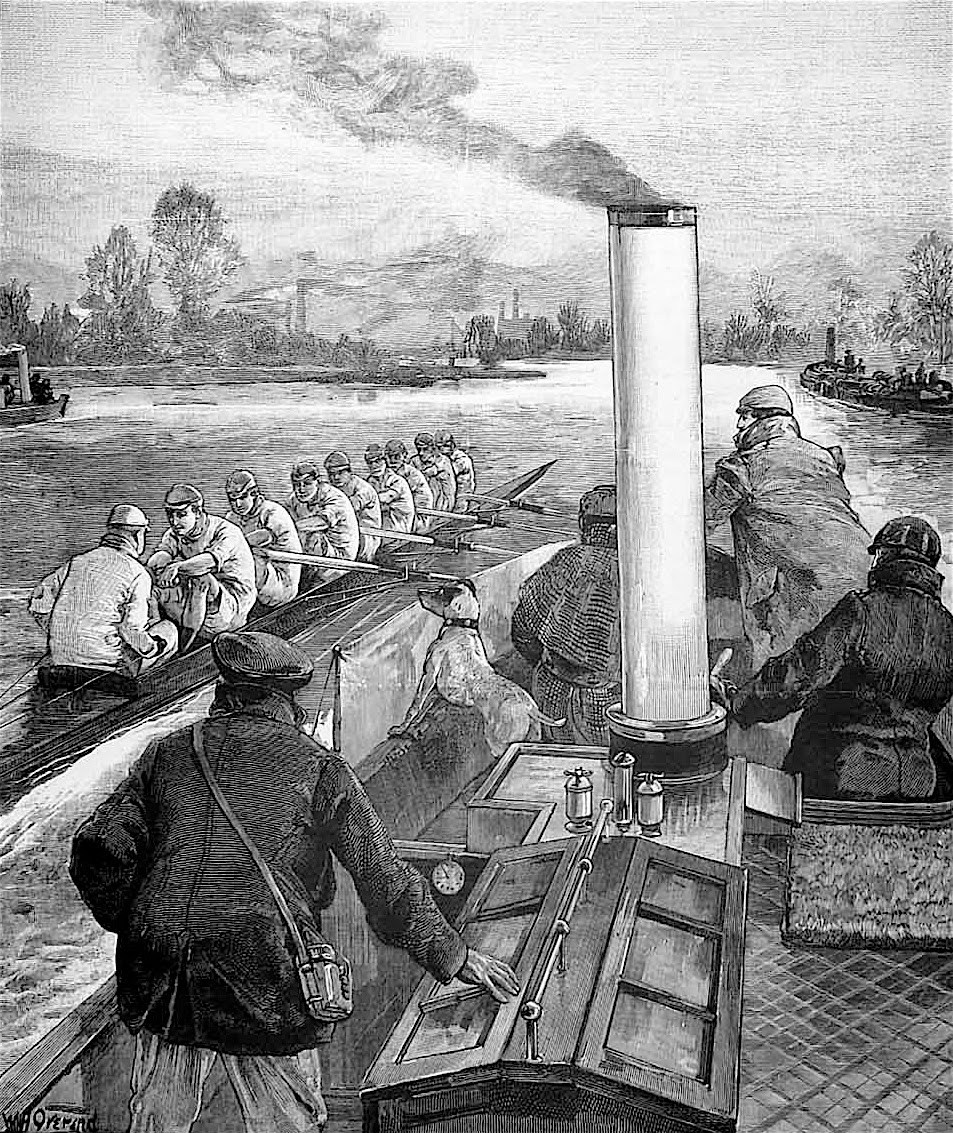
Stanley Muttlebury coaching CUBC from a steamer, 1892

== See also ==
- University rowing in the United Kingdom
