= Blue Boat =

Sporting honour

The Blue Boat is the highest level boat representing the University of Oxford or the University of Cambridge in the universities' annual rowing races on the River Thames, The Boat Race and Women's Boat Race. As of 2016, the women's first VIII (also referred to as a Blue Boat) race also takes places on the River Thames, along with their male counterparts. The men's and women's Lightweight races moved to the Thames in 2019 and 2020 respectively.

"Blue" refers to the oarsmen and women in these first boats each earning their University Sporting Blue, an honour bestowed on sportsmen and women of each university who compete at the highest level in certain sports in Oxford/Cambridge competitions. Oxford is commonly referred to as the "Dark Blues" and Cambridge as the "Light Blues".
