= Lightweight rowing =

Category of rowing

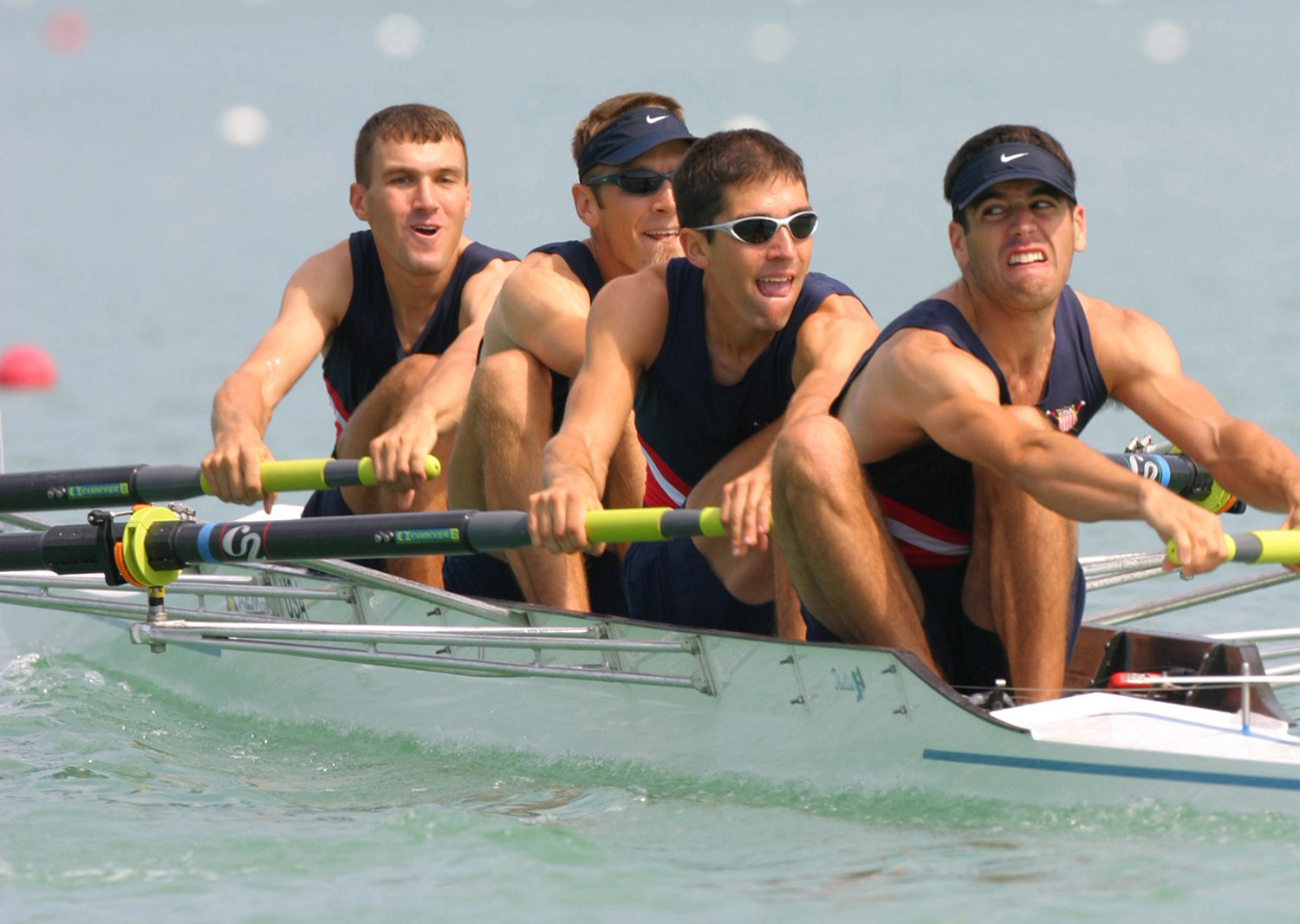
A US lightweight four rowing team. Left to right, Capt. Matt Smith teams with Erik Miller, Steve Warner and Paul Teti at the 2003 World Rowing Championships on the Idroscalo.

Lightweight rowing (abbreviated Lwt or Lt) is a category of rowing where limits are placed on the maximum body weight of competitors. According to World Rowing (FISA), this weight category was introduced "to encourage more universality in the sport especially among nations with less statuesque people".

At the international level, for crew boats, the limits are:

- Men: Crew average 70 kg (154.3 lb) – no rower over 72.5 kg (159.8 lb)
- Women: Crew average 57 kg (125.7 lb) – no rower over 59 kg (130.1 lb)

For single sculls, the limits are 72.5 kg (159.8 lb) for men and 59 kg (130.1 lb) for women.

== History ==
The first lightweight events were added to the World Championships in 1974 for men and 1985 for women. Lightweight rowing was added to the Olympics in 1996 but this came under threat in 2002 when the Programme Commission of the IOC recommended that, outside combat sports and weightlifting, there should not be weight category events. The recommendation was initially rejected in 2002; however in 2023, the Executive Board opted to remove all lightweight events from the 2028 Olympics. From 1996–2016, the men's Lightweight 4– was included in the Olympics and from 1996–2024, the men's and women's Lightweight 2x were included in the Olympics. Lightweight Rowing is still raced at the World Championships.

== United Kingdom ==
In the United Kingdom, lightweight rowing is less prevalent than in the US. At university rowing level, lightweight categories are offered at BUCS events, such as the BUCS Regatta, alongside openweight categories. In addition, both the men's and women's lightweight boat races are contended between the universities of Oxford and Cambridge as part of the Lightweight Boat Races. In club rowing, regattas less often offer lightweight events. An exception is the Henley Women's Regatta where there are numerous lightweight categories. At the Henley Royal Regatta lightweight rowers are expected to compete in openweight categories.

Under British Rowing rules of racing, the lightweight limits during winter are different from those in summer.

== United States ==
At the collegiate level, many larger American Division I schools can field between one and three lightweight boats for both men and women.

In both lightweight men's and lightweight women's collegiate rowing, competition at the school-funded 'Varsity' level is small but fiercely competitive; the de facto national championship for both disciplines is the Intercollegiate Rowing Association Championship held each year on Mercer Lake in New Jersey on the weekend after Memorial Day. However, several club rowing programs (e.g., California Lightweight Crew), which receive minimal or no school funding, consistently field lightweight crews that compete for Division III equivalent titles at the Dad Vail Regatta on the Schuylkill River in Philadelphia, and, most recently, at the American Collegiate Rowing Association Championships.

In the US collegiate category, the following limits apply as of spring 2011:

- Men: no rower over 160 lb (72.6 kg).
- Women: no rower over 130 lb (59.0 kg).

In contrast, high school age U.S. rowing teams seldom compete in lightweight categories. In recent years the practice of juniors training down to a weight has been questioned, as low BMI has been linked to health and growth problems in adolescents. In 2021, USRowing removed all youth lightweight events at USRowing-run regattas, including the Youth National Championships. However, non-USRowing regattas may still choose to offer lightweight events.

In the high school category, the following limits apply as of winter 2023:

- Men: no rower over 150 lb (68.0 kg).
- Women: no rower over 130 lb (59.0 kg).
