= Belarus at the 1996 Summer Olympics =

- IOC code: BLR
- NOC: Belarus Olympic Committee
- Website: www.noc.by (in Russian and English)

in Atlanta
- Competitors: 157 (91 men, 66 women) in 19 sports
- Flag bearer: Aleksey Medvedev
- Medals Ranked 37th: Gold 1 Silver 6 Bronze 8 Total 15

Summer Olympics appearances (overview)
- 1996; 2000; 2004; 2008; 2012; 2016; 2020; 2024

Other related appearances
- Russian Empire (1900–1912); Poland (1924–1936); Soviet Union (1952–1988); Unified Team (1992); Individual Neutral Athletes (2024)

Belarus competed in the Summer Olympic Games for the first time as an independent nation at the 1996 Summer Olympics in Atlanta, United States. Previously, Belarusian athletes competed for the Unified Team at the 1992 Summer Olympics. 157 competitors, 91 men and 66 women, took part in 115 events in 19 sports.

== Medalists ==
Medal	Name	Sport	Event
Gold	Ekaterina Karsten	Rowing	Women's single sculls
Silver	Vladimir Dubrovshchik	Athletics	Men's discus throw
Silver	Natalya Sazanovich	Athletics	Women's heptathlon
Silver	Igor Basinsky	Shooting	Men's 50 metre pistol
Silver	Aleksandr Pavlov	Wrestling	Men's Greco-Roman 48 kg
Silver	Sergey Lishtvan	Wrestling	Men's Greco-Roman 100 kg
Silver	Aleksey Medvedev	Wrestling	Men's freestyle 130 kg
Bronze	Vasiliy Kaptyukh	Athletics	Men's discus throw
Bronze	Ellina Zvereva	Athletics	Women's discus throw
Bronze	Vitaly Scherbo	Gymnastics	Men's artistic individual all-around
Bronze	Vitaly Scherbo	Gymnastics	Men's horizontal bar
Bronze	Vitaly Scherbo	Gymnastics	Men's parallel bars
Bronze	Vitaly Scherbo	Gymnastics	Men's vault
Bronze	Yelena Mikulich; Marina Znak; Nataliya Volchek; Nataliya Stasyuk; Tamara Davydenko; Valentina Skrabatun; Nataliya Lavrinenko; Yaroslava Pavlovich; Aleksandra Pankina	Rowing	Women's eight
Bronze	Valery Tsilent	Wrestling	Men's Greco-Roman 82 kg

== Archery ==
In its debut Olympic archery competition, Belarus was represented by two women. Their combined record was 4–2 as Olga Yakusheva made it to the quarterfinals before being defeated.

Athlete	Event	Ranking round		Round of 64	Round of 32	Round of 16	Quarterfinals	Semifinals	Finals / BM	
Athlete	Event	Score	Seed	Opposition Score	Opposition Score	Opposition Score	Opposition Score	Opposition Score	Opposition Score	Rank
Olga Yakusheva	Women's individual	635	35	Persson-Nordlander (SWE) (30); W 159–151	Nasaridze (TUR) (3); W 153 9 –153 9	Lin (TPE) (19); W 161–157	Altankaynak (TUR) (6); L 107–109	did not advance		5
Olga Zabugina	Women's individual	645	18	Pfohl (GER) (47); W 158–152	Williamson (GBR) (15); L 147–152	did not advance				32

== Athletics ==
Key

- Note–Ranks given for track events are within the athlete's heat only
- Q = Qualified for the next round
- q = Qualified for the next round as a fastest loser or, in field events, by position without achieving the qualifying target

Men

Road events

Athlete	Event	Time	Rank
Yevgeniy Misyulya	20 km walk	1:21:16	9
Mikhail Khmelnitskiy	20 km walk	1:22:17	12
Viktor Ginko	50 km walk	3:45:27	5
Yevgeniy Misyulya	50 km walk	did not advance	

Field events

Athlete	Event	Qualification		Final	
Athlete	Event	Result	Rank	Result	Rank
Dmitriy Markov	Pole vault	5.60	12 q	5.86	6
Igor Astapkovich	Hammer Throw	75.82	2 Q	78.20	7
Sergey Alay	Hammer Throw	75.10	6 q	77.38	8
Aleksandr Krasko	Hammer Throw	73.74	10	did not advance	
Dzimitry Hancharuk	Shot put	19.57	5 q	19.79	9
Viktor Bulat	Shot put	17.29	17	did not advance	
Vladimir Dubrovshchik	Discus throw	63.22	5 Q	66.20	Silver medal
Vasiliy Kaptyukh	Discus throw	62.22	12 q	65.80	Bronze medal

Combined events - Decathlon

Athlete	Event	100 m	LJ	SP	HJ	400 m	110H	DT	PV	JT	1500 m	Points	Rank
Eduard Hämäläinen	Result	10.85	7.48	16.32	1.98	46.91	13.95	49.62	5.00	57.66	4:34.68	8613	5
Eduard Hämäläinen	Points	894	930	871	785	963	981	862	910	703	714	8613	5

Women

Track & road events

Athlete	Event	Heat		Quarterfinal		Semifinal		Final	
Athlete	Event	Time	Rank	Time	Rank	Time	Rank	Time	Rank
Natallia Safronnikava	200m	23.14	5 q	23.15	4 Q	22.98	7	did not advance	
Anna Kozak	400m	52.39	3 Q	52.14	6	did not advance			
Natasha Dukhnova	800m	1.59.23	1 Q	—		1:58.67	4 Q	2:00.32	7
Natasha Dukhnova	1500m	8	4:14.75	—		4:11.43	6	did not advance	
Lidiya Yurkova	100m hurdles	13.20	4 Q	13.07	7	did not advance			
Tatyana Ledovskaya	400m hurdles	55.82	4 q	—		54.99	7	did not advance	
Nelli Voronkova	400m hurdles	56.97	6	—		did not advance			
Tanya Kurochkina	400m hurdles	57.28	7	—		did not advance			
Yelena Mazovka	Marathon	—						2:36.22	24
Natalia Galuchko	Marathon	—						2:44.21	50
Madina Biktagirova	Marathon	—						Did not finish	
Olga Kardopoltseva	10 km walk	—						43:02	6
Valentina Tsybulskaya	10 km walk	—						43:21	8
Nataliya Misyulya	10 km walk	—						45:11	17

Field events

Athlete	Event	Qualification		Final	
Athlete	Event	Result	Rank	Result	Rank
Anzhela Atroshchenko	Long Jump	5.94	33	did not advance	
Natallia Sazanovich	Long Jump	NM		did not advance	
Tatyana Khramova	High Jump	1.90	7	did not advance	
Natallia Shikolenko	Javelin Throw	63.32	4 q	58.56	12
Ellina Zvereva	Discus Throw	62.74	8 Q	65.54	Bronze medal
Ira Yatchenko	Discus Throw	62.04	11 Q	60.46	12
Lyudmila Filimonova	Discus Throw	53.30	38	did not advance	

Combined events - Heptathlon

Athlete	Event	100H	HJ	SP	200 m	LJ	JT	800 m	Points	Rank
Natalya Sazanovich	Result	13.56	1.80	14.52	23.72	6.70	46.00	2:17.92	6563	Silver medal
Natalya Sazanovich	Points	1041	978	829	1008	1072	783	852	6563	Silver medal
Anzhela Atroshchenko	Result	DNF	did not start						-	-
Anzhela Atroshchenko	Points	-	did not start						-	-

== Badminton ==
Athlete	Event	Round of 64	Round of 32	Round of 16	Quarterfinal	Semifinal	Final / BM	
Athlete	Event	Opposition Score	Opposition Score	Opposition Score	Opposition Score	Opposition Score	Opposition Score	Rank
Mikhail Korshuk	Men's singles	Helber (GER); L 12–15, 1–15	Did not advance					=33
Vlada Tcherniavskaya	Women's singles	Sentoso (INA); L 11–6, 3–11, 1-15	Did not advance					=33
Vlada Tcherniavskaya; Mikhail Korshuk	Women's doubles	—	Cator / Blackburn (NZL); L 14–18, 9–15	Did not advance				=17

== Boxing ==
Men

Athlete	Event	Round of 32	Round of 16	Quarterfinals	Semifinals	Final	
Athlete	Event	Opposition Result	Opposition Result	Opposition Result	Opposition Result	Opposition Result	Rank
Serguei Ostrochapkine	Lightweight	Dennis Zimba (ZAM); L RSC2	Did not advance				17
Sergey Bykovsky	Light welterweight	Besiki Wardzetashvili (GEO); W 11–11	Nordine Mouichi (FRA); L 6–17	Did not advance			9
Vadim Mezga	Welterweight	Lucas Sinoia (MOZ); W 11–6	Juan Hernández Sierra (CUB); L 2–12	Did not advance			9
Sergey Dychkov	Heavyweight	Romāns Kukļins (LAT); W 16–6	Garth da Silva (NZL); W 12–8	Luan Krasniqi (GER); L 5–10	Did not advance		5
Sergei Liakhovich	Super heavyweight	BYE	Paea Wolfgramm (TON); L 9–10	Did not advance			9

== Canoeing ==
=== Slalom ===
Athlete	Event	Run 1		Run 2		Best	
Athlete	Event	Time	Rank	Time	Rank	Time	Rank
Yelena Kurzina	Women's K-1	225.14	15	284.37	27	225.14	25

=== Sprint ===
Athlete	Event	Heat		Repechage		Semifinal		Final	
Athlete	Event	Time	Rank	Time	Rank	Time	Rank	Time	Rank
Sergey Kaleshink	Men's K-1 500 m	1:43.279	3 Q	Bye		1:42.505	8	Did not advance	
Dmitri Dovgalenok; Aleksandr Maseikov	Men's C-2 500 m	1:47.923	6 R	1:47.837	1 Q	1:43.938	3 Q	1:46.840	9

== Cycling ==
Road

Athlete	Event	Time	Rank
Pavel Kavetsky	Men's Road race	4:56:48	69
Yevgeny Golovanov	Men's Road race	5:05:38 11:	113
Oleg Bondarik	Men's Road race	Did not finish	
Vyacheslav German	Men's Road race	Did not finish	
Aleksandr Sharapov	Men's Road race	Did not finish	
Pavel Kavetsky	Women's Road race	2:37:06	14

Track

Athlete	Event	Result	Rank
Pavel Kavetsky	Women's Points race	11	6

== Diving ==
Men

Athlete	Event	Preliminary		Semifinal				Final			
Athlete	Event	Points	Rank	Points	Rank	Total	Rank	Points	Rank	Total	Rank
Andrey Semenyuk	3 m springboard	385.32	7 Q	202.23	16	587.55	9 Q	393.33	9	595.56	10
Vyacheslav Khamulkin	3 m springboard	331.86	21	Did not advance							
Sergey Kudrevich	10 m platform	375.90	10 Q	180.63	4	556.53	9 Q	347.37	12	528.00	11
Andrey Kvochinsky	10 m platform	349.14	15 Q	160.50	15	509.64	16	did not advance			

Women

Athlete	Event	Preliminary		Semifinal				Final			
Athlete	Event	Points	Rank	Points	Rank	Total	Rank	Points	Rank	Total	Rank
Svetlana Alekseyeva	3 m springboard	246.7	14 Q	200.37	14	446.64	14	did not advance			

== Fencing ==
One male fencer represented Belarus in 1996.

Athlete	Event	Round of 64	Round of 32	Round of 16	Quarterfinal	Semifinal	Final / BM	
Athlete	Event	Opposition Result	Opposition Result	Opposition Result	Opposition Result	Opposition Result	Opposition Result	Rank
Vitaly Zakharov	Men's épée	Frazão (POR); W 15–11	Mazzoni (ITA); L 11–15	Did not advance				

== Gymnastics ==
=== Artistic ===
Men
Team

Athlete	Event	Qualification								Final							
Athlete	Event	Apparatus						Total	Rank	Apparatus						Total	Rank
Athlete	Event	F	PH	R	V	PB	HB	Total	Rank	F	PH	R	V	PB	HB	Total	Rank
Vitaly Scherbo	Team	9.687 9.775 Q	9.612 9.000	9.425 9.525	9.725 9.650 Q	9.687 9.687 Q	9.687 9.750 Q	115.210	2 Q	9.687 9.775	9.612 9.000	9.425 9.525	9.725 9.650	9.687 9.687	9.687 9.750	—	
Andrei Kan	Team	9.525 9.700	9.375 9.712	9.400 9.550	9.500 9.537	9.625 9.512	9.525 9.400	114.361	11 Q	9.525 9.700	9.375 9.712	9.400 9.550	9.500 9.537	9.625 9.512	9.525 9.400	—	
Vitaly Rudnitski	Team	9.425 9.700	9.150 9.450	9.250 9.675	9.650 9.500	9.350 9.275	9.400 8.800	112.65	31	9.425 9.700	9.150 9.450	9.250 9.675	9.650 9.500	9.350 9.275	9.400 8.800	—	
Aleksandr Belanovski	Team	9.250 0.000	9.525 9.450	9.350 9.575	9.587 9.100	9.350 9.425	9.500 9.400	103.512	72	9.250 0.000	9.525 9.450	9.350 9.575	9.587 9.100	9.350 9.425	9.500 9.400	—	
Aleksandr Shostak	Team	0.000 9.375	9.425 9.662	9.250 9.500	9.650 9.475	9.375 9.475	—	85.187	92	0.000 9.375	9.425 9.662	9.250 9.500	9.650 9.475	9.375 9.475	—	—	
Ivan Pavlovski	Team	9.562 9.562	—	9.200 9.600	9.675 9.612	0.000 8.025	8.750 9.100	83.086	96	9.562 9.562	—	9.200 9.600	9.675 9.612	0.000 8.025	8.750 9.100	—	
Aleksei Sinkevich	Team	9.500 9.425	9.625 9.625	—		0.000 9.625	9.225 9.375	66.400	103	32 Q	9.500 9.425	9.625 9.625	—		0.000 9.625	9.225 9.375	—
Total	Team	95.861 (2)	95.461 (2)	94.600 (8)	96.061 (3)	95.036 (5)	94.362 (11)	571.381	4 Q	95.861 (2)	95.461 (2)	94.600 (8)	96.061 (3)	95.036 (5)	94.362 (11)	571.381	4

Individual finals

Athlete	Event	Apparatus						Total	Rank
Athlete	Event	F	PH	R	V	PB	HB	Total	Rank
Andrei Kan	All-around	9.600	9.675	9.562	9.525	8.600	9.000	55.962	30
Ivan Pavlovski	Vault	—			9.493	—		9.493	8
Vitaly Rudnitski	All-around	9.675	9.700	9.600	9.512	9.350	8.125	55.962	30
Vitaly Scherbo	Floor	9.275	—					9.275	7
Vitaly Scherbo	Vault	—			9.724	—		9.724	Bronze medal
Vitaly Scherbo	Parallel bars	—				9.800	—	9.800	Bronze medal
Vitaly Scherbo	Horizontal bar	—					9.800	9.800	Bronze medal
Vitaly Scherbo	All-around	9.762	9.662	9.587	9.687	9.712	9.787	58.197	Bronze medal

Women
Team

Athlete	Event	Qualification						Final					
Athlete	Event	Apparatus				Total	Rank	Apparatus				Total	Rank
Athlete	Event	V	UB	BB	F	Total	Rank	V	UB	BB	F	Total	Rank
Yelena Piskun	Team	9.700 9.650	9.812 9.575	9.187 9.587	9.700 9.575	76.786	16 Q	9.700 9.650	9.812 9.575	9.187 9.587	9.700 9.575	—	
Alena Polozkova	Team	9.637 9.562	9.750 9.562	9.550 9.587	9.637 9.362	76.647	20 Q	9.637 9.562	9.750 9.562	9.550 9.587	9.637 9.362	—	
Svetlana Boginskaya	Team	9.737 9.737 Q	9.412 9.175	9.425 9.425	9.737 9.575	76.223	25 Q	9.737 9.737	9.412 9.175	9.425 9.425	9.737 9.575	—	
Olga Yurkina	Team	9.325 9.437	9.475 9.012	9.362 9.362	9.375 8.937	74.285	47	9.325 9.437	9.475 9.012	9.362 9.362	9.375 8.937	—	
Ludmila Vitiukova	Team	9.612 9.475	—	9.462 9.412	9.512 9.612	57.085	86	9.612 9.475	—	9.462 9.412	9.512 9.612	—	
Svetlana Tarasevich	Team	9.562 9.637	9.662 9.487	—	9.300 9.325	56.973	87	9.562 9.637	9.662 9.487	—	9.300 9.325	—	
Tatiana Zharganova	Team	—	9.675 8.925	9.150 8.387	—	36.137	102	—	9.675 8.925	9.150 8.387	—	—	
Total	Team	96.309 (5)	95.185 (9)	94.359 (6)	95.410 (7)	381.263	6 Q	96.309 (5)	95.185 (9)	94.359 (6)	95.410 (7)	381.263	6

Individual finals

Athlete	Event	Apparatus				Total	Rank
Athlete	Event	V	UB	BB	F	Total	Rank
Svetlana Boginskaya	Vault	9.712	—			9.712	5
Svetlana Boginskaya	All-around	9.687	9.675	9.537	9.600	38.499	14
Yelena Piskun	All-around	9.687	9.712	9.675	9.575	38.649	12
Alena Polozkova	All-around	9.587	9.162	9.450	9.600	37.799	25

=== Rhythmic ===
Individual

Athlete	Event	Preliminaries						Semifinal						Final					
Athlete	Event	Apparatus				Total		Apparatus				Total		Apparatus				Total	
Athlete	Event	Rope	Ball	Clubs	Ribbon	Score	Rank	Rope	Ball	Clubs	Ribbon	Score	Rank	Hoop	Ball	Clubs	Ribbon	Score	Rank
Larissa Loukianenko	All-around	9.699	9.366	9.716	9.700	38.481	4 Q	9.700	9.750	9.616	9.683	38.749	5 Q	9.466	9.750	9.700	9.750	38.666	7
Tatyana Ogryzko	All-around	8.766	9.750	9.750	9.633	37.899	9 Q	9.633	9.682	9.700	9.666	38.681	6 Q	9.585	9.682	9.599	9.666	38.530	8

Group

Athlete	Event	Preliminaries				Final			
Athlete	Event	Apparatus		Total		Apparatus		Total	
Athlete	Event	5 Hoops	3 Balls 2 Ribbons	Score	Rank	5 Hoops	3 Balls 2 Ribbons	Score	Rank
Nataliya Budilo; Olga Demskaya; Oksana Zhdanovich; Svetlana Luzanova; Galina Malashenko; Alesya Pokhodina	All-around	19.300	19.133	38.433	4 Q	19.266	18.716	37.982	6

== Judo ==
Men

Athlete	Event	Preliminary	Round of 32	Round of 16	Quarterfinals	Semifinals	Repechage 1	Repechage 2	Repechage 3	Final / BM	
Athlete	Event	Opposition Result	Opposition Result	Opposition Result	Opposition Result	Opposition Result	Opposition Result	Opposition Result	Opposition Result	Opposition Result	Rank
Natik Bagirov	−60 kg	BYE	Narender Singh (IND); W 0100–0000	Richard Trautmann (GER); L 0000–0101	Did not advance		Clifton Sunada (USA); W 0100–0000	Kim Jong-won (KOR); W 0100–0000	Giorgi Vazagashvili (GEO); W 0100–0000	Dorjpalamyn Narmandakh (MGL); L 0000–0101	5
Leonid Svirid	−95 kg	BYE	Stéphane Traineau (FRA); L 0000–1000	Did not advance			Daniel Gowing (AUS); L 0000–0100	Did not advance			13
Ruslan Scharapov	+95 kg	—	Damon Keeve (USA); W 1000–0000	Rafał Kubacki (POL); L 0000–0001	Did not advance						17

Women

Athlete	Event	Round of 32	Round of 16	Quarterfinals	Semifinals	Repechage 1	Repechage 2	Repechage 3	Final / BM	
Athlete	Event	Opposition Result	Opposition Result	Opposition Result	Opposition Result	Opposition Result	Opposition Result	Opposition Result	Opposition Result	Rank
Tatiana Moskvina	−48 kg	Ryoko Tamura (JPN); L 0000–0100	Did not advance			Dora Maldonado (HON); W 0010–0000	Giovanna Tortora (ITA); W 0010–0000	Salima Souakri (ALG); L 0000–0100	Did not advance	7

== Rowing ==
Men

Athlete	Event	Heats		Repechages		Semifinals		Final	
Athlete	Event	Time	Rank	Time	Rank	Time	Rank	Time	Rank
Orlin Ninov; Nikolay Kolev	Coxless pair	6:56.09	3 Q	7:12.14	5 FC	BYE		7:03.31	14
Konstantin Belevich; Sergey Tarasevich; Oleg Solomakhin; Denis Tabako	Quadruple sculls	6:08.38	3 R	BYE		6:15.07	6 FB	5:55.52	11

Women

Athlete	Event	Heats		Repechages		Semifinals		Final	
Athlete	Event	Time	Rank	Time	Rank	Time	Rank	Time	Rank
Ekaterina Karsten	Single sculls	8:03.73	1 Q	BYE		8:00.02	2 FA	7:32.31	Gold medal
Yelena Mikulich; Marina Znak; Nataliya Volchek; Nataliya Stasyuk; Tamara Davydenko; Valentina Skrabatun; Nataliya Lavrinenko; Aleksandra Pankina	Eights	6:24.61	1 FA	BYE		—		6:24.44	Bronze medal

== Sailing ==
Women

Athlete	Event	Race											Net points	Final rank
Athlete	Event	1	2	3	4	5	6	7	8	9	10	11	Net points	Final rank
Anastasiya Podobed	Europe	24	~~26~~	24	26	~~27~~	26	24	23	23	24	25	219.0	26

Open

Athlete	Event	Race											Net points	Final rank
Athlete	Event	1	2	3	4	5	6	7	8	9	10	11	Net points	Final rank
Aleksandr Zelenovsky	Laser	~~38~~	23	~~28~~	26	21	18	13	16	15	17	14	163.0	20
Sergey Kravtsov; Viktor Budantsev	Tornado	9	15	~~PMS~~	~~16~~	11	10	16	6	11	16	7	137.0	14
Sergey Khoretsky; Vladimir Zuyev	Star	18	21	19	21	~~22~~	20	~~22~~	21	22	20	—	162.0	23

M = Medal race; EL = Eliminated – did not advance into the medal race; CAN = Race cancelled

== Shooting ==
Men

Athlete	Event	Qualification		Final	
Athlete	Event	Score	Rank	Score	Rank
Igor Basinski	10 m air pistol	582	7 Q	681.8	7
Igor Basinski	50 m pistol	565	4 Q	662.0	Silver medal
Anatoli Klimenko	10 m air rifle	590	11	Did not advance	
Anatoli Klimenko	50 m rifle three positions	1158	28	Did not advance	
Kanstantsin Lukashyk	10 m air pistol	580	9	Did not advance	
Kanstantsin Lukashyk	50 m pistol	564	5 Q	660.1	4
Sergei Martynov	50 m rifle prone	598	3 Q	699.6	6
Sergei Martynov	50 m rifle three positions	1166	7 Q	1263.9	8
Georgi Nekhayev	10 m air rifle	585	26	Did not advance	
Georgi Nekhayev	50 m rifle prone	592	30	Did not advance	

Women

Athlete	Event	Qualification		Final	
Athlete	Event	Score	Rank	Score	Rank
Lalita Milshina	10 m air pistol	382	8 Q	479.1	8
Olga Pogrebniak	50 m rifle three positions	577	17	Did not advance	
Olga Pogrebniak	10 m air rifle	394	6 Q	496.4	5
Zhanna Shitsik	25 m pistol	577	14	Did not advance	
Irina Shilova	50 m rifle three positions	577	17	Did not advance	
Irina Shilova	10 m air rifle	393	9	Did not advance	
Yulia Sinyak	25 m pistol	578	9	Did not advance	
Yulia Sinyak	10 m air pistol	381	10	Did not advance	

== Swimming ==
Men

Athlete	Event	Heat		Final B		Final	
Athlete	Event	Time	Rank	Time	Rank	Time	Rank
Aleksandr Gukov	200 metre breaststroke	2:17.49	20	Did not advance			
Dimitri Kalinovski	50 metre freestyle	23.61	36	Did not advance			
Alexei Kriventsov	100 metre breaststroke	1:04.20	27	Did not advance			
Sergei Mikhnovets	1500 m freestyle	15:41.80	19	Did not advance			
Aleh Rukhlevich	50 metre freestyle	23.12	22	Did not advance			
Aleh Rukhlevich	100 metre freestyle	50.42	19	Did not advance			

Women

Athlete	Event	Heat		Final B		Final	
Athlete	Event	Time	Rank	Time	Rank	Time	Rank
Natalya Baranovskaya	100 metre butterfly	1:04.09	34	Did not advance			
Inga Borodich	200 metre freestyle	2:05.85	33	Did not advance			
Alena Popchanka	50 metre freestyle	27.18	40	Did not advance			
Yelena Rudkovskaya	100 metre breaststroke	1:13.71	33	Did not advance			
Svetlana Zhidko	100 metre freestyle	58.64	40	Did not advance			
Svetlana Zhidko; Inga Borodich; Natalya Baranovskaya; Alena Popchanka	4 × 100 m freestyle relay	3:50.22	15	Did not advance			
Svetlana Zhidko; Inga Borodich; Natalya Baranovskaya; Alena Popchanka	4 × 200 m freestyle relay	8:21.70	17	Did not advance			

== Table tennis ==
Athlete	Event	Group stage				Round of 16	Quarterfinal	Semifinal	Final / BM	
Athlete	Event	Opposition Result	Opposition Result	Opposition Result	Rank	Opposition Result	Opposition Result	Opposition Result	Opposition Result	Rank
Vladimir Samsonov	Men's singles	Hylton (JAM); W 2–0	Prean (GBR); W 2–0	A Mazunov (RUS); W 2–1	1	D Mazunov (RUS); W 3–0	Wang (CHN); L 2–3	Did not advance		
Vladimir Samsonov; Yevgeny Shchetinin	Men's doubles	Lee / Yoo (KOR); L 0–2	A Mazunov / D Mazunov (RUS); L 0–2	Butler / Sweeris (USA); W 2–0	3	—	Did not advance			

== Tennis ==
Women

Athlete	Event	Round of 64	Round of 32	Round of 16	Quarterfinal	Semifinal	Final / BM	
Athlete	Event	Opposition Result	Opposition Result	Opposition Result	Opposition Result	Opposition Result	Opposition Result	Rank
Olga Barabanschikova	Singles	Pierce (FRA); L 3–6, 5–7	Did not advance					
Natasha Zvereva	Singles	Appelmans (BEL); W 7–5, 6–3	Coetzer (RSA); W 6–1, 4–6, 6–2	Martínez (ESP); W 2–6, 7–5	Did not advance			
Olga Barabanschikova; Natasha Zvereva	Doubles	—	D'Agostini / Menga (BRA); W 6–2, 6–3	Hetherington / Hy-Boulais (CAN); L 6–2, 4–6, 1–6	Did not advance			

== Weightlifting ==
Men

Athlete	Event	Snatch		Clean & jerk		Total	Rank
Athlete	Event	Result	Rank	Result	Rank	Total	Rank
Viktor Sinyak	−59 kg	112.5	12	137.5	14	250.0	12
Oleg Kechko	−76 kg	155.0	13	180.0	12	335.0	11
Leonid Lobachev	−76 kg	160.0	5	182.5	9	342.5	9
Viktor Belyatsky	−91 kg	167.5	10	190.0	20	357.5	17
Vladimir Khlud	−91 kg	165.0	14	195.0	16	360.0	15
Oleg Chiritso	−99 kg	172.5	10	207.5	9	380.0	9
Gennady Shchekalo	−108 kg	175.0	12	~~215.0~~	DNF	175.0	DNF
Vladimir Yemelyanov	−108 kg	187.5	5	220.0	4	407.5	4
Aleksandr Kurlovich	+108 kg	195.0	4	230.0	7	425.0	5

== Wrestling ==
Men's freestyle

Athlete	Event	Round 1	Round 2	Round 3	Round 4	Round 5	Round 6	Final / BM	
Athlete	Event	Opposition Result	Opposition Result	Opposition Result	Opposition Result	Opposition Result	Opposition Result	Opposition Result	Rank
Aleksandr Guzov	−57 kg	BYE	Mohammad Talaei (IRI); W 5–3	Šaban Trstena (MKD); L 3–7	Sanshiro Abe (JPN); W 6–5	Harun Doğan (TUR); L 0–3	BYE	Damir Zakhartdinov (UZB); W 3–2	7
Sergey Smal	−62 kg	Martin Müller (SUI); W 6–0	Tom Brands (USA); L 0–5	Jürgen Scheibe (GER); W 8–1	Takahiro Wada (JPN); L 0–3	Did not advance			11
Oleg Gogol	−68 kg	Yosvany Sánchez (CUB); W 3–1	Arayik Gevorgyan (ARM); L 2–3	Craig Roberts (CAN); W 4–0	Zaza Zazirov (UKR); L 1–6	Did not advance			9
Igor Kozyr	−74 kg	Árpád Ritter (HUN); W 5-3	Takuya Ota (JPN); L 1–4	Boris Budayev (UZB); L 1–4	Did not advance				14
Aleksandr Savko	−82 kg	Les Gutches (USA); L 2–3	Magomed Ibragimov (AZE); L 0–5	Did not advance					19
Sergey Kovalevsky	−100 kg	Arawat Sabejew (GER); L 0–3	Kim Tae-woo (KOR); W 3–1	Ben Vincent (AUS); W 10–0	Dolgorsürengiin Sumiyaabazar (MGL); W 3–0	Sagid Murtazaliev (UKR); W 8–4	Marek Garmulewicz (POL); W 4–0	Arawat Sabejew (GER); L 4–7	5
Aleksey Medvedev	−130 kg	Petros Bourdoulis (GRE); W 7–1	Zaza Turmanidze (GEO); W 3–1	BYE	Sven Thiele (GER); W 0–0	BYE		Mahmut Demir (TUR); L 0–3	Silver medal

Men's Greco-Roman

Athlete	Event	Round 1	Round 2	Round 3	Round 4	Round 5	Round 6	Final / BM	
Athlete	Event	Opposition Result	Opposition Result	Opposition Result	Opposition Result	Opposition Result	Opposition Result	Opposition Result	Rank
Aleksandr Pavlov	−48 kg	José Ochoa (VEN); W 11–0	Kang Yong-gyun (PRK); W 3–2	BYE	Wilber Sánchez (CUB); W 5–0	BYE		Sim Kwon-ho (KOR); L 0–4	Silver medal
Ibad Akhmedov	−52 kg	Ulises Valentin (DOM); W 11–0	Brandon Paulson (USA); L 1–6	Nurym Dyusenov (KAZ); L 4–5	Did not advance				11
Igor Petrenko	−62 kg	Włodzimierz Zawadzki (POL); L 3–4	Arutik Rubenian (GRE); W 3–1	Ahad Pazaj (IRI); L 2–6F	Did not advance				13
Kamandar Madzhidov	−68 kg	Kim Young-il (KOR); W 3–1	Marko Yli-Hannuksela (FIN); W 5–0	BYE	Ghani Yalouz (FRA); L 1–4	BYE	Biser Georgiev (BUL); W 3–1	Aleksandr Tretyakov (RUS); L 0–4	4
Vladimir Kopytov	−74 kg	Erik Hahn (GER); L 2–4	Nazmi Avluca (TUR); L 2–3	Did not advance					14
Valery Tsilent	−82 kg	Jean-Pierre Wafflard (BEL); W 10–0	Raatbek Sanatbayev (KGZ); W 7–1	Hamza Yerlikaya (TUR); L 0–5	Sergey Tsvir (RUS); W 6–0	BYE	Martin Lidberg (SWE); W 4–1	Daulet Turlykhanov (KAZ); W 4–0	Bronze medal
Aleksandr Sidorenko	−90 kg	Derrick Waldroup (USA); W 3–0	Maik Bullmann (GER); L 0–1	Sergey Matviyenko (KAZ); W 1–1	Tsolak Yeghishyan (ARM); W 3–1	Marek Švec (CZE); W 3–1	Iordanis Konstantinidis (GRE); W 5–0	Maik Bullmann (GER); L 0–2	4
Sergey Lishtvan	−100 kg	Todor Manov (BUL); W 2–0	Jason Gleasman (USA); W 3–0	BYE	Mikael Ljungberg (SWE); W 2–1	BYE		Andrzej Wroński (POL); L 0–0	Silver medal
