= Rowing at the 1996 Summer Olympics – Women's eight =

Women's eight at the Games of the XXVI Olympiad
- Date: 22–28 July 1996
- Competitors: 72 from 8 nations

Medalists
1st place, gold medalist(s)		Liliana Gafencu; Veronica Cochela; Elena Georgescu; Anca Tănase; Doina Spîrcu; Marioara Popescu; Ioana Olteanu; Elisabeta Lipă; Doina Ignat	Romania
2nd place, silver medalist(s)		Anna van der Kamp; Tosha Tsang; Lesley Thompson; Emma Robinson; Jessica Monroe; Heather McDermid; Maria Maunder; Theresa Luke; Alison Korn	Canada
3rd place, bronze medalist(s)		Yelena Mikulich; Marina Znak; Nataliya Volchek; Nataliya Stasyuk; Tamara Davydenko; Valentina Skrabatun; Nataliya Lavrinenko; Yaroslava Pavlovich; Aleksandra Pankina	Belarus

The women's eight competition at the 1996 Summer Olympics in Atlanta, Georgia took place at Lake Lanier.

== Competition format ==
The competition consisted of two main rounds (heats and finals) as well as a repechage. The 8 boats were divided into two heats for the first round, with 4 boats in each heat. The first-place boat in each heat (2 boats total) advanced directly to the "A" final. The remaining 6 boats were placed in the repechage. The repechage featured a single heat. The top 4 boats in the repechage advanced to the "A" final, while the remaining 2 boats (5th and 6th placers in the repechage) were sent to the "B" final.

The boats in the "A" final competed for medals and 4th through 6th place; the boats in the "B" final competed for 7th and 8th.

All races were over a 2000 metre course.

== Results ==
=== Heats ===
==== Heat 1 ====
Rank	Rowers	Coxswain	Nation	Time	Notes
1	Yelena Mikulich; Marina Znak; Nataliya Volchek; Nataliya Stasyuk; Tamara Davydenko; Valentina Skrabatun; Nataliya Lavrinenko; Aleksandra Pankina	Yaroslava Pavlovich	Belarus	6:24.61	QA
2	Anne Kakela; Mary McCagg; Laurel Korholz; Catriona Fallon; Betsy McCagg; Monica Tranel Michini; Amy Fuller; Jennifer Dore	Yasmin Farooq	United States	6:28.45	R
3	Femke Boelen; Marleen van der Velden; Astrid van Koert; Marieke Westerhof; Rita de Jong; Tessa Knaven; Tessa Appeldoorn; Muriel van Schilfgaarde	Jissy de Wolf	Netherlands	6:32.71	R
4	Jennifer Luff; Gina Douglas; Amy Safe; Anna Ozolins; Karina Wieland; Alison Davies; Carmen Klomp; Bronwyn Thompson	Kaylynn Hick	Australia	6:35.69	R

==== Heat 2 ====
Rank	Rowers	Coxswain	Nation	Time	Notes
1	Liliana Gafencu; Veronica Cochela; Anca Tănase; Doina Spîrcu; Marioara Popescu; Ioana Olteanu; Elisabeta Lipă; Doina Ignat	Elena Georgescu	Romania	6:23.94	QA
2	Anna van der Kamp; Tosha Tsang; Emma Robinson; Jessica Monroe; Heather McDermid; Maria Maunder; Theresa Luke; Alison Korn	Lesley Thompson	Canada	6:29.08	R
3	Ina Justh; Antje Rehaag; Kathleen Naser; Andrea Gesch; Dana Pyritz; Micaela Schmidt; Anja Pyritz; Ute Schell-Wagner-Stange	Daniela Neunast	Germany	6:33.90	R
4	Annamarie Stapleton; Lisa Eyre; Dot Blackie; Kate Pollitt; Miriam Batten; Cath Bishop; Joanne Turvey; Alison Gill	Suzie Ellis	Great Britain	6:39.34	R

=== Repechage ===
Rank	Rowers	Coxswain	Nation	Time	Notes
1	Anne Kakela; Mary McCagg; Laurel Korholz; Catriona Fallon; Betsy McCagg; Monica Tranel Michini; Amy Fuller; Jennifer Dore	Yasmin Farooq	United States	6:06.17	QA
2	Anna van der Kamp; Tosha Tsang; Emma Robinson; Jessica Monroe; Heather McDermid; Maria Maunder; Theresa Luke; Alison Korn	Lesley Thompson	Canada	6:06.49	QA
3	Femke Boelen; Marleen van der Velden; Astrid van Koert; Marieke Westerhof; Rita de Jong; Tessa Knaven; Tessa Appeldoorn; Muriel van Schilfgaarde	Jissy de Wolf	Netherlands	6:08.85	QA
4	Jennifer Luff; Gina Douglas; Amy Safe; Anna Ozolins; Karina Wieland; Alison Davies; Carmen Klomp; Bronwyn Thompson	Kaylynn Hick	Australia	6:08.92	QA
5	Ina Justh; Antje Rehaag; Kathleen Naser; Andrea Gesch; Dana Pyritz; Micaela Schmidt; Anja Pyritz; Ute Schell-Wagner-Stange	Daniela Neunast	Germany	6:09.43	QB
6	Annamarie Stapleton; Lisa Eyre; Dot Blackie; Kate Pollitt; Miriam Batten; Cath Bishop; Joanne Turvey; Alison Gill	Suzie Ellis	Great Britain	6:12.28	QB

=== Finals ===
==== Final B ====
Rank	Rowers	Coxswain	Nation	Time
7	Annamarie Stapleton; Lisa Eyre; Dot Blackie; Kate Pollitt; Miriam Batten; Cath Bishop; Joanne Turvey; Alison Gill	Suzie Ellis	Great Britain	6:15.21
8	Ina Justh; Antje Rehaag; Kathleen Naser; Andrea Gesch; Dana Pyritz; Micaela Schmidt; Anja Pyritz; Ute Schell-Wagner-Stange	Daniela Neunast	Germany	6:17.73

==== Final A ====
Rank	Rowers	Coxswain	Nation	Time
1st place, gold medalist(s)	Liliana Gafencu; Veronica Cochela; Anca Tănase; Doina Spîrcu; Marioara Popescu; Ioana Olteanu; Elisabeta Lipă; Doina Ignat	Elena Georgescu	Romania	6:19.73
2nd place, silver medalist(s)	Anna van der Kamp; Tosha Tsang; Emma Robinson; Jessica Monroe; Heather McDermid; Maria Maunder; Theresa Luke; Alison Korn	Lesley Thompson	Canada	6:24.05
3rd place, bronze medalist(s)	Yelena Mikulich; Marina Znak; Nataliya Volchek; Nataliya Stasyuk; Tamara Davydenko; Valentina Skrabatun; Nataliya Lavrinenko; Aleksandra Pankina	Yaroslava Pavlovich	Belarus	6:24.44
4	Anne Kakela; Mary McCagg; Laurel Korholz; Catriona Fallon; Betsy McCagg; Monica Tranel Michini; Amy Fuller; Jennifer Dore	Yasmin Farooq	United States	6:26.19
5	Jennifer Luff; Gina Douglas; Amy Safe; Anna Ozolins; Karina Wieland; Alison Davies; Carmen Klomp; Bronwyn Thompson	Kaylynn Hick	Australia	6:30.10
6	Femke Boelen; Marleen van der Velden; Astrid van Koert; Marieke Westerhof; Rita de Jong; Tessa Knaven; Tessa Appeldoorn; Muriel van Schilfgaarde	Jissy de Wolf	Netherlands	6:31.11

== Final classification ==
The following rowers took part:

Rank	Rowers	Country
1st place, gold medalist(s)	Liliana Gafencu; Veronica Cochela; Elena Georgescu; Anca Tănase; Doina Spîrcu; Marioara Popescu; Ioana Olteanu; Elisabeta Lipă; Doina Ignat	Romania
2nd place, silver medalist(s)	Anna van der Kamp; Tosha Tsang; Lesley Thompson; Emma Robinson; Jessica Monroe; Heather McDermid; Maria Maunder; Theresa Luke; Alison Korn	Canada
3rd place, bronze medalist(s)	Yelena Mikulich; Marina Znak; Nataliya Volchek; Nataliya Stasyuk; Tamara Davydenko; Valentina Skrabatun; Nataliya Lavrinenko; Yaroslava Pavlovich; Aleksandra Pankina	Belarus
	Anne Kakela; Mary McCagg; Laurel Korholz; Catriona Fallon; Betsy McCagg; Monica Tranel Michini; Amy Fuller; Jennifer Dore; Yasmin Farooq	United States
	Jennifer Luff; Gina Douglas; Amy Safe; Anna Ozolins; Karina Wieland; Alison Davies; Carmen Klomp; Bronwyn Thompson; Kaylynn Hick	Australia
	Femke Boelen; Marleen van der Velden; Astrid van Koert; Marieke Westerhof; Rita de Jong; Tessa Knaven; Tessa Appeldoorn; Muriel van Schilfgaarde; Jissy de Wolf	Netherlands
	Annamarie Stapleton; Lisa Eyre; Dot Blackie; Kate Pollitt; Miriam Batten; Cath Bishop; Joanne Turvey; Alison Gill; Suzie Ellis	Great Britain
	Ina Justh; Antje Rehaag; Kathleen Naser; Andrea Gesch; Dana Pyritz; Micaela Schmidt; Anja Pyritz; Ute Schell-Wagner-Stange; Daniela Neunast	Germany
