= Rowing at the 1996 Summer Olympics =

Rowing at the Games of the XXVI Olympiad
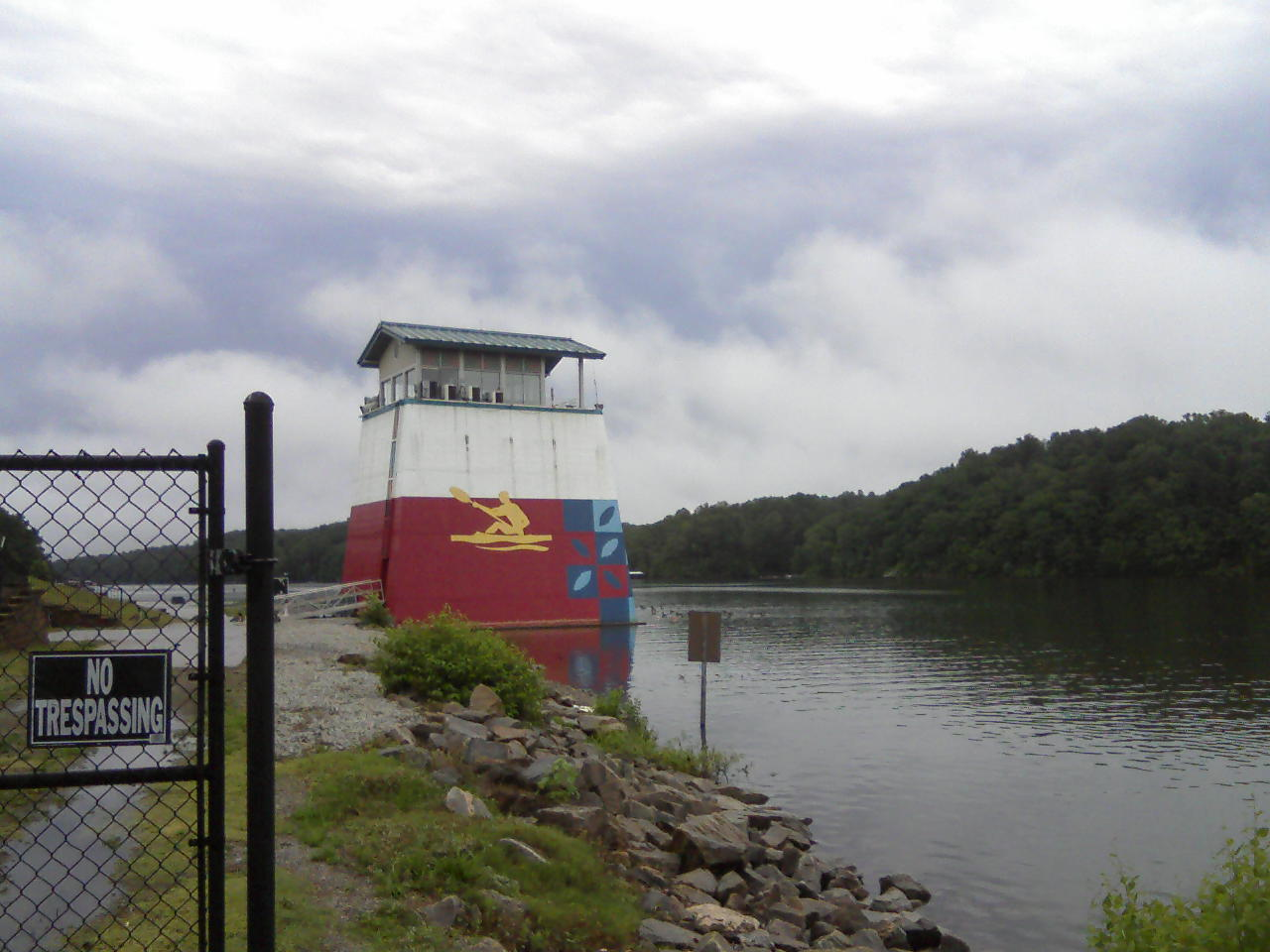
- 2010 photo of the finish tower at Lake Lanier where the canoe sprint and rowing competitions for the 1996 Summer Olympics took place
- Venue: Lake Lanier, Georgia
- Date: July 21–28, 1996
- No. of events: 14
- Competitors: 608 (403 men, 205 women) from 45 nations

Taking place at Lake Lanier, Georgia, United States, the 1996 Summer Olympics saw the debut of lightweight rowing events.

== Medal table ==
Rank	Nation	Gold	Silver	Bronze	Total
1	Australia	2	1	3	6
2	Germany	2	1	1	4
3	Romania	2	0	0	2
3	Switzerland	2	0	0	2
5	Canada	1	4	1	6
6	Netherlands	1	1	1	3
7	Belarus	1	0	1	2
7	Denmark	1	0	1	2
7	Great Britain	1	0	1	2
10	Italy	1	0	0	1
11	United States	0	3	1	4
12	France	0	1	3	4
13	China	0	1	0	1
13	Norway	0	1	0	1
13	Ukraine	0	1	0	1
16	Russia	0	0	1	1
Totals (16 entries)		14	14	14	42

=== Men's events ===
Games	Gold	Silver	Bronze
Single sculls	Xeno Müller; Switzerland	Derek Porter; Canada	Thomas Lange; Germany
Double sculls	Agostino Abbagnale and Davide Tizzano; Italy	Steffen Størseth and Kjetil Undset; Norway	Frédéric Kowal and Samuel Barathay; France
Quadruple sculls	Germany; Andreas Hajek; Stephan Volkert; André Steiner; André Willms	United States; Tim Young; Eric Mueller; Brian Jamieson; Jason Gailes	Australia; Janusz Hooker; Bo Hanson; Duncan Free; Ronald Snook
Coxless pair	Matthew Pinsent and Steve Redgrave; Great Britain	David Weightman and Rob Scott; Australia	Michel Andrieux and J.-C. Rolland; France
Coxless four	Australia; Nicholas Green; Drew Ginn; James Tomkins; Mike McKay	France; Bertrand Vecten; Olivier Moncelet; Daniel Fauché; Gilles Bosquet	Great Britain; Gregory Searle; Jonathan William Searle; Rupert John Obholzer; Tim Foster
Eights	Netherlands; Koos Maasdijk; Ronald Florijn; Jeroen Duyster (cox); Michiel Bartman; Henk-Jan Zwolle; Niels van der Zwan; Niels van Steenis; Diederik Simon; Nico Rienks	Germany; Mark Kleinschmidt; Detlef Kirchhoff; Wolfram Huhn; Roland Baar; Marc Weber; Ulrich Viefers; Peter Thiede (cox); Thorsten Streppelhoff; Frank Jörg Richter	Russia; Pavel Melnikov; Andrey Glukhov; Anton Chermashentsev; Aleksandr Lukyanov (cox); Nikolay Aksyonov; Dmitry Rozinkevich; Sergey Matveyev; Roman Monchenko; Vladimir Volodenkov; Vladimir Sokolov
Lightweight double sculls	Michael Gier and Markus Gier; Switzerland	Maarten van der Linden and Pepijn Aardewijn; Netherlands	Bruce Hick and Anthony Edwards; Australia
Lightweight coxless four	Denmark; Victor Feddersen; Niels Henriksen; Thomas Poulsen; Eskild Ebbesen	Canada; Brian Peaker; Jeffrey Lay; Dave Boyes; Gavin Hassett	United States; Marc Schneider; Jeff Pfaendtner; David Collins; William Carlucci

=== Women's events ===
Games	Gold	Silver	Bronze
Single sculls	Ekaterina Karsten; Belarus	Silken Laumann; Canada	Trine Hansen; Denmark
Double sculls	Kathleen Heddle and Marnie McBean; Canada	Zhang Xiuyun and Cao Mianying; China	Irene Eijs and Eeke van Nes; Netherlands
Quadruple sculls	Germany; Katrin Rutschow-Stomporowski; Jana Sorgers; Kerstin Köppen; Kathrin Boron	Ukraine; Svitlana Maziy; Dina Miftakhutdynova; Inna Frolova; Olena Ronzhyna	Canada; Laryssa Biesenthal; Diane O'Grady; Kathleen Heddle; Marnie McBean
Coxless pair	Megan Still and Kate Slatter; Australia	Karen Kraft and Melissa Schwen; United States	Christine Gossé and Hélène Cortin; France
Eight	Romania; Liliana Gafencu; Veronica Cochela; Elena Georgescu; Anca Tănase; Doina Spîrcu; Marioara Popescu; Ioana Olteanu; Elisabeta Lipă; Doina Ignat	Canada; Anna van der Kamp; Tosha Tsang; Lesley Thompson; Emma Robinson; Jessica Monroe; Heather McDermid; Maria Maunder; Theresa Luke; Alison Korn	Belarus; Yelena Mikulich; Marina Znak; Nataliya Volchek; Nataliya Stasyuk; Tamara Davydenko; Valentina Skrabatun; Nataliya Lavrinenko; Yaroslava Pavlovich; Aleksandra Pankina
Lightweight double sculls	Constanța Burcică and Camelia Macoviciuc; Romania	Teresa Bell and Lindsay Burns; United States	Virginia Lee and Rebecca Joyce; Australia

== See also ==
- Rowing at the Summer Olympics
- List of Olympic medalists in rowing (men)
- List of Olympic medalists in rowing (women)
- Rowers at the 1996 Summer Olympics
