= Belarus at the Olympics =

- IOC code: BLR
- NOC: Belarus Olympic Committee
- Website: www.noc.by (in Russian and English)
- Medals Ranked 40th: Gold 21 Silver 37 Bronze 47 Total 105

Summer appearances
- 1996; 2000; 2004; 2008; 2012; 2016; 2020; 2024; 2028

Winter appearances
- 1994; 1998; 2002; 2006; 2010; 2014; 2018; 2022; 2026

Other related appearances
- Russian Empire (1900–1912); Poland (1924–1936); Soviet Union (1952–1988); Unified Team (1992); Individual Neutral Athletes (2024–2026)

Athletes from Belarus began their Olympic participation at the 1952 Summer Games in Helsinki, Finland, as part of the Soviet Union (IOC code: URS). After the Soviet Union disbanded in 1991, Belarus, along with four of the other fourteen former Soviet republics, competed in the 1992 Winter Olympics (held in Albertville, France) as the Unified Team. Later in 1992, Belarus joined eleven republics to compete as the Unified Team at the Summer Games in Barcelona, Spain. Two years later, Belarus competed for the first time as an independent nation in the 1994 Winter Olympics, held in Lillehammer, Norway.

With a total of 109 medals, Belarus is ranked third amongst post-Soviet states, after Russia and Ukraine. Since 1994, Belarus has won medals at each Winter and Summer Olympics it has participated in.

In 2022, in response to the Belarus-assisted Russian invasion of Ukraine, Belarusian athletes were temporarily suspended by the International Olympic Committee. In January 2023, the International Olympic Committee announced plans to allow Belarusian athletes to participate at the 2024 Summer Olympics as Individual Neutral Athletes (AIN). With the war extending into 2026, Belarusian athletes were also allowed to participate as Individual Neutral Athletes at the 2026 Winter Olympics.

== Timeline of participation ==
| Olympic Year/s | Teams | |
|---|---|---|
| 1900–1912 | Russian Empire | |
| 1920–1936 | | |
| 1952–1988 | Soviet Union | |
| 1992 | Unified Team | |
| 1994–2016 | Russia | Belarus |
| 2018 | Olympic Athletes from Russia | Belarus |
| 2020–2022 | ROC | Belarus |
| 2024–present | Individual Neutral Athletes | |

== Medal tables ==
=== Medals by Summer Games ===
| Games | Athletes | Gold | Silver | Bronze | Total | Rank |
| 1900–1912 | as part of the Russian Empire | | | | | |
| 1920–1948 | did not participate | | | | | |
| 1952–1988 | as part of the Soviet Union | | | | | |
| 1992 Barcelona | as part of the Unified Team | | | | | |
| 1996 Atlanta | 157 | 1 | 6 | 8 | 15 | 37 |
| 2000 Sydney | 139 | 3 | 3 | 11 | 17 | 23 |
| 2004 Athens | 151 | 2 | 5 | 6 | 13 | 26 |
| 2008 Beijing | 181 | 3 | 4 | 7 | 14 | 23 |
| 2012 London | 165 | 2 | 5 | 3 | 10 | 29 |
| 2016 Rio de Janeiro | 124 | 1 | 4 | 4 | 9 | 40 |
| 2020 Tokyo | 101 | 1 | 3 | 3 | 7 | 45 |
| 2024 Paris | as part of the Individual Neutral Athletes | | | | | |
| 2028 Los Angeles | future event | | | | | |
| 2032 Brisbane | future event | | | | | |
| Total (7/30) | 1,018 | 13 | 30 | 42 | 85 | 51 |

=== Medals by Winter Games ===
| Games | Athletes | Gold | Silver | Bronze | Total | Rank |
| 1956–1988 | as part of the Soviet Union | | | | | |
| 1992 Albertville | as part of the Unified Team | | | | | |
| 1994 Lillehammer | 33 | 0 | 2 | 0 | 2 | 15 |
| 1998 Nagano | 59 | 0 | 0 | 2 | 2 | 20 |
| 2002 Salt Lake City | 64 | 0 | 0 | 1 | 1 | 23 |
| 2006 Turin | 28 | 0 | 1 | 0 | 1 | 21 |
| 2010 Vancouver | 50 | 1 | 1 | 1 | 3 | 17 |
| 2014 Sochi | 25 | 5 | 0 | 1 | 6 | 8 |
| 2018 Pyeongchang | 33 | 2 | 1 | 0 | 3 | 15 |
| 2022 Beijing | 26 | 0 | 2 | 0 | 2 | 24 |
| 2026 Milano Cortina | as part of the Individual Neutral Athletes | | | | | |
| 2030 French Alps | future event | | | | | |
| 2034 Utah | future event | | | | | |
| Total (8/25) | 318 | 8 | 7 | 5 | 20 | 22 |

=== Medals by summer sport ===
| Sport | Gold | Silver | Bronze | Total |
|---|---|---|---|---|
| Athletics | 3 | 5 | 7 | 15 |
| Gymnastics | 2 | 4 | 7 | 13 |
| Canoeing | 2 | 3 | 4 | 9 |
| Rowing | 2 | 1 | 4 | 7 |
| Weightlifting | 1 | 4 | 3 | 8 |
| Shooting | 1 | 2 | 4 | 7 |
| Judo | 1 | 0 | 1 | 2 |
| Tennis | 1 | 0 | 1 | 2 |
| Wrestling | 0 | 7 | 7 | 14 |
| Swimming | 0 | 2 | 1 | 3 |
| Boxing | 0 | 2 | 0 | 2 |
| Modern pentathlon | 0 | 0 | 2 | 2 |
| Cycling | 0 | 0 | 1 | 1 |
| Totals (13 entries) | 13 | 30 | 42 | 85 |

=== Medals by winter sport ===
| Sport | Gold | Silver | Bronze | Total |
|---|---|---|---|---|
| Biathlon | 4 | 4 | 3 | 11 |
| Freestyle skiing | 4 | 2 | 2 | 8 |
| Speed skating | 0 | 1 | 0 | 1 |
| Totals (3 entries) | 8 | 7 | 5 | 20 |

== List of medalists ==
=== Summer Olympics ===
| Medal | Name | Games | Sport | Event |
|---|---|---|---|---|
| Gold | Ekaterina Karsten | 1996 Atlanta | Rowing | Women's single sculls |
| Silver | Vladimir Dubrovshchik | 1996 Atlanta | Athletics | Men's discus throw |
| Silver | Natallia Sazanovich | 1996 Atlanta | Athletics | Women's heptathlon |
| Silver | Igor Basinsky | 1996 Atlanta | Shooting | Men's 50 metre pistol |
| Silver | Aleksandr Pavlov | 1996 Atlanta | Wrestling | Men's Greco-Roman 48 kg |
| Silver | Sergey Lishtvan | 1996 Atlanta | Wrestling | Men's Greco-Roman 100 kg |
| Silver | Aleksey Medvedev | 1996 Atlanta | Wrestling | Men's freestyle 130 kg |
| Bronze | Vasiliy Kaptyukh | 1996 Atlanta | Athletics | Men's discus throw |
| Bronze | Ellina Zvereva | 1996 Atlanta | Athletics | Women's discus throw |
| Bronze | Vitaly Scherbo | 1996 Atlanta | Gymnastics (Artistic) | Individual all-around |
| Bronze | Vitaly Scherbo | 1996 Atlanta | Gymnastics (Artistic) | Men's horizontal bar |
| Bronze | Vitaly Scherbo | 1996 Atlanta | Gymnastics (Artistic) | Men's parallel bars |
| Bronze | Vitaly Scherbo | 1996 Atlanta | Gymnastics (Artistic) | Men's vault |
| Bronze | Tamara Davydenko; Nataliya Lavrinenko; Yelena Mikulich; Aleksandra Pankina; Yaroslava Pavlovich; Valentina Skrabatun; Nataliya Stasyuk; Nataliya Volchek; Marina Znak | 1996 Atlanta | Rowing | Women's Eight |
| Bronze | Valery Tsilent | 1996 Atlanta | Wrestling | Men's Greco-Roman 82 kg |
| Gold | Ellina Zvereva | 2000 Sydney | Athletics | Women's discus throw |
| Gold | Yanina Korolchik | 2000 Sydney | Athletics | Women's shot put |
| Gold | Ekaterina Karsten | 2000 Sydney | Rowing | Women's single sculls |
| Silver | Yulia Raskina | 2000 Sydney | Gymnastics (Rhythmic) | Individual all-around |
| Silver | Tatyana Ananko; Tatyana Belan; Anna Glazkova; Irina Ilyenkova; Maria Lazuk; Olga Puzhevich | 2000 Sydney | Gymnastics (Rhythmic) | Group all-around |
| Silver | Igor Basinsky | 2000 Sydney | Shooting | Men's 50 metre pistol |
| Bronze | Igor Astapkovich | 2000 Sydney | Athletics | Men's hammer throw |
| Bronze | Iryna Yatchenko | 2000 Sydney | Athletics | Women's discus throw |
| Bronze | Natallia Sazanovich | 2000 Sydney | Athletics | Women's heptathlon |
| Bronze | Anatoly Laryukov | 2000 Sydney | Judo | Men's 73 kg |
| Bronze | Pavel Dovgal | 2000 Sydney | Modern pentathlon | Men's individual |
| Bronze | Igor Basinsky | 2000 Sydney | Shooting | Men's 10 metre air pistol |
| Bronze | Sergei Martynov | 2000 Sydney | Shooting | Men's 50 metre rifle prone |
| Bronze | Lalita Yauhleuskaya | 2000 Sydney | Shooting | Women's 25 metre pistol |
| Bronze | Gennady Oleshchuk | 2000 Sydney | Weightlifting | Men's 62 kg |
| Bronze | Sergey Lavrenov | 2000 Sydney | Weightlifting | Men's 69 kg |
| Bronze | Dmitry Debelka | 2000 Sydney | Wrestling | Men's Greco-Roman 130 kg |
| Gold | Yulia Nestsiarenka | 2004 Athens | Athletics | Women's 100 metres |
| Gold | Ihar Makarau | 2004 Athens | Judo | Men's 100 kg |
| Silver | Magomed Aripgadjiev | 2004 Athens | Boxing | Light heavyweight |
| Silver | Viktar Zuyev | 2004 Athens | Boxing | Heavyweight |
| Silver | Ekaterina Karsten | 2004 Athens | Rowing | Women's single sculls |
| Silver | Andrei Rybakou | 2004 Athens | Weightlifting | Men's 85 kg |
| Silver | Hanna Batsiushka | 2004 Athens | Weightlifting | Women's 63 kg |
| Bronze | Vadzim Makhneu; Raman Piatrushenka | 2004 Athens | Canoeing | Men's K-2 500 metres |
| Bronze | Natallia Tsylinskaya | 2004 Athens | Cycling | Women's track time trial |
| Bronze | Yuliya Bichyk; Natallia Helakh | 2004 Athens | Rowing | Women's coxless pair |
| Bronze | Sergei Martynov | 2004 Athens | Shooting | Men's 50 metre rifle prone |
| Bronze | Tatsiana Stukalava | 2004 Athens | Weightlifting | Women's 63 kg |
| Bronze | Viachaslau Makaranka | 2004 Athens | Wrestling | Men's Greco-Roman 84 kg |
| Gold | Andrei Bahdanovich; Aliaksandr Bahdanovich | 2008 Beijing | Canoeing | Men's C-2 1000 m |
| Gold | Raman Piatrushenka; Aliaksei Abalmasau; Artur Litvinchuk; Vadzim Makhneu | 2008 Beijing | Canoeing | Men's K-4 1000 m |
| Gold | Andrei Aramnau | 2008 Beijing | Weightlifting | Men's 105 kg |
| Silver | Vadim Devyatovskiy | 2008 Beijing | Athletics | Men's hammer throw |
| Silver | Andrei Krauchanka | 2008 Beijing | Athletics | Men's decathlon |
| Silver | Inna Zhukova | 2008 Beijing | Gymnastics (Rhythmic) | Individual all-around |
| Silver | Murad Gaidarov | 2008 Beijing | Wrestling | Men's 74 kg |
| Bronze | Ivan Tsikhan | 2008 Beijing | Athletics | Men's hammer throw |
| Bronze | Vadzim Makhneu; Raman Piatrushenka | 2008 Beijing | Canoeing | Men's K-2 500 m |
| Bronze | Olesya Babushkina; Anastasia Ivankova; Zinaida Lunina; Glafira Martinovich; Ksenia Sankovich; Alina Tumilovich | 2008 Beijing | Gymnastics (Rhythmic) | Group all-around |
| Bronze | Ekaterina Karsten | 2008 Beijing | Rowing | Women's single sculls |
| Bronze | Yuliya Bichyk; Natallia Helakh | 2008 Beijing | Rowing | Women's coxless pair |
| Bronze | Mikhail Siamionau | 2008 Beijing | Wrestling | Men's 66 kg |
| Bronze | Anastasiya Samusevich | 2008 Beijing | Modern pentathlon | Women's |
| Gold | Sergei Martynov | 2012 London | Shooting | Men's 50 m rifle prone |
| Gold | Victoria Azarenka; Max Mirnyi | 2012 London | Tennis | Mixed doubles |
| Silver | Andrei Bahdanovich; Aliaksandr Bahdanovich | 2012 London | Canoeing | Men's C-2 1000 m |
| Silver | Raman Piatrushenka; Vadzim Makhneu | 2012 London | Canoeing | Men's K-2 200 m |
| Silver | Maryna Hancharova; Anastasia Ivankova; Nataliya Leshchyk; Aliaksandra Narkevich; Ksenia Sankovich; Alina Tumilovich | 2012 London | Gymnastics (Rhythmic) | Group all-around |
| Silver | Aliaksandra Herasimenia | 2012 London | Swimming | Women's 50 m freestyle |
| Silver | Aliaksandra Herasimenia | 2012 London | Swimming | Women's 100 m freestyle |
| Bronze | Volha Khudzenka; Iryna Pamialova; Nadzeya Papok; Maryna Pautaran | 2012 London | Canoeing | Women's K-4 500 m |
| Bronze | Liubov Charkashyna | 2012 London | Gymnastics (Rhythmic) | Individual all-around |
| Bronze | Victoria Azarenka | 2012 London | Tennis | Women's singles |
| Gold | Uladzislau Hancharou | 2016 Rio de Janeiro | Gymnastics | Men's trampoline |
| Silver | Darya Naumava | 2016 Rio de Janeiro | Weightlifting | Women's 75 kg |
| Silver | Vadzim Straltsou | 2016 Rio de Janeiro | Weightlifting | Men's 94 kg |
| Silver | Maryia Mamashuk | 2016 Rio de Janeiro | Wrestling | Women's 63 kg |
| Silver | Ivan Tsikhan | 2016 Rio de Janeiro | Athletics | Men's hammer throw |
| Bronze | Aliaksandra Herasimenia | 2016 Rio de Janeiro | Swimming | Women's 50 m freestyle |
| Bronze | Javid Hamzatau | 2016 Rio de Janeiro | Wrestling | Men's Greco-Roman 85 kg |
| Bronze | Ibrahim Saidau | 2016 Rio de Janeiro | Wrestling | Men's freestyle 125 kg |
| Bronze | Marharyta Makhneva; Nadzeya Liapeshka; Volha Khudzenka; Maryna Litvinchuk | 2016 Rio de Janeiro | Canoeing | Women's K-4 500 m |
| Gold | Ivan Litvinovich | 2020 Tokyo | Gymnastics | Men's trampoline |
| Silver | Iryna Kurachkina | 2020 Tokyo | Wrestling | Women's freestyle 57 kg |
| Silver | Magomedkhabib Kadimagomedov | 2020 Tokyo | Wrestling | Men's freestyle 74 kg |
| Silver | Volha Khudzenka; Maryna Litvinchuk; Marharyta Makhneva; Nadzeya Papok | 2020 Tokyo | Canoeing | Women's K-4 500 metres |
| Bronze | Maksim Nedasekau | 2020 Tokyo | Athletics | Men's high jump |
| Bronze | Vanesa Kaladzinskaya | 2020 Tokyo | Wrestling | Women's freestyle 53 kg |
| Bronze | Alina Harnasko | 2020 Tokyo | Gymnastics | Women's rhythmic individual all-around |

=== Winter Olympics ===
| Medal | Name | Games | Sport | Event |
|---|---|---|---|---|
| Silver | Svetlana Paramygina | 1994 Lillehammer | Biathlon | Women's sprint |
| Silver | Igor Zhelezovski | 1994 Lillehammer | Speed skating | Men's 1000 m |
| Bronze | Alexei Aidarov | 1998 Nagano | Biathlon | Men's individual |
| Bronze | Dmitri Dashinski | 1998 Nagano | Freestyle skiing | Men's aerials |
| Bronze | Aleksei Grishin | 2002 Salt Lake City | Freestyle skiing | Men's aerials |
| Silver | Dmitri Dashinski | 2006 Turin | Freestyle skiing | Men's aerials |
| Gold | Aleksei Grishin | 2010 Vancouver | Freestyle skiing | Men's aerials |
| Silver | Sergey Novikov | 2010 Vancouver | Biathlon | Men's individual |
| Bronze | Darya Domracheva | 2010 Vancouver | Biathlon | Women's individual |
| Gold | Darya Domracheva | 2014 Sochi | Biathlon | Women's individual |
| Gold | Darya Domracheva | 2014 Sochi | Biathlon | Women's mass start |
| Gold | Darya Domracheva | 2014 Sochi | Biathlon | Women's pursuit |
| Gold | Anton Kushnir | 2014 Sochi | Freestyle skiing | Men's aerials |
| Gold | Alla Tsuper | 2014 Sochi | Freestyle skiing | Women's aerials |
| Bronze | Nadezhda Skardino | 2014 Sochi | Biathlon | Women's individual |
| Gold | Hanna Huskova | 2018 Pyeongchang | Freestyle skiing | Women's aerials |
| Silver | Darya Domracheva | 2018 Pyeongchang | Biathlon | Women's mass start |
| Gold | Nadezhda Skardino; Iryna Kryuko; Dzinara Alimbekava; Darya Domracheva | 2018 Pyeongchang | Biathlon | Women's relay |
| Silver | Anton Smolski | 2022 Beijing | Biathlon | Men's individual |
| Silver | Hanna Huskova | 2022 Beijing | Freestyle skiing | Women's aerials |

== Soviet Union ==
Athletes from the Soviet Union began participating in the Olympic Games in 1952, winning 194 total medals in the Winter Games and 1010 at the Summer Games for a total of 1204 medals. Of those medals, 473 were gold, 376 were silver and 355 were bronze. The Belarusian collection of medals began with Mikhail Krivonosov winning silver in the hammer throw at the 1956 Summer Olympics in Melbourne, Australia. The Soviet Republic's first gold medal was won by Leonid Geishtor and Sergei Makarenko in the 1000 metre pairs canoe event during the 1960 Summer Games in Rome, Italy. The Soviet Union first competed in the Winter Olympics in 1956, located in Cortina. In 1988, the Soviet Union competed for the last time as a unified country.

== Unified Team ==
Gymnast Vitaly Shcherbo won six gold medals at the 1992 Summer Olympics in Barcelona.

== Summer Olympic Games ==
=== 1996 Atlanta ===
In Belarus's first independent appearance at the Summer Olympics, the delegation took home fifteen medals: one gold, six silver and eight bronze. The first Belarusian gold medal was won by Ekaterina Karsten in the women's single sculls rowing event. The silver medals were won in athletics, shooting, and wrestling (both freestyle and Greco-Roman). The bronze medals were won in artistic gymnastics, athletics, rowing and Greco-Roman wrestling. The country sent 159 athletes to compete in 21 disciplines.

=== 2000 Sydney ===
The Belarusian government, using public funds and sponsorships, spent five million USD to prepare the athletes for the 2000 Olympics. Minister of Sports and Tourism Yevgeny Vorsin predicted that Belarus would win four gold medals during the Games. Belarus finished with three gold, three silver and 11 bronze medals. Karsten successfully defended her championship in the single sculls, with the other two gold medals won by Yanina Karolchik and Ellina Zvereva in the shot put and discus throw events, respectively. The Belarusian women took silver in both individual and team rhythmic gymnastics, with a third silver medal coming in the men's 50 metre pistol event. Bronze medals were won in hammer throwing, shooting (3), Greco-Roman wrestling, pentathlon, weight lifting (2), judo, heptathlon and discus throwing. One athlete from Belarus, Vadim Devyatovsky, was banned from Olympic competition due to testing positive for the substance nandrolone.

=== 2004 Athens ===
Belarus used leftover funds from the Sydney Games to prepare athletes to compete in the 2004 Olympics. Belarus sent to Athens 153 athletes competing in 21 disciplines. Those athletes won 15 medals: two golds, six silvers, and nine bronzes. The gold medals were won in the 100 meter dash and in judo. The silver medals were won in weightlifting (2), boxing (2), rowing and the hammer throw. The bronzes were won in shooting, the discus throw, weightlifting, cycling, rowing (2), wrestling (Greco-Roman) and canoeing/kayaking (2). Ivan Tsikhan originally won the bronze in the hammer throw, but his medal was upgraded to silver after Adrian Annus of Hungary was stripped of his gold medal due to doping. Yulia Nestsiarenka, who was not expected to do well in the 100 meter dash, took home the gold in the event. She was clocked at 10.93 seconds, beating the second place American by 0.03 seconds. Wrestler Alexander Medved was tasked to carry the national flag during the opening ceremony.

=== 2008 Beijing ===
One hundred and eighty-one athletes from Belarus competed in 28 events at the Beijing Olympics. Before the Olympics started, the National Olympic Committee of Belarus announced that medal winners would be awarded cash prizes, valued in United States dollars, from the Committee and their sponsors. Another sponsor, Belatmit, offered gold medal winners free sausage for life. The women's basketball team would be given free sausage regardless of what medal they won. The team captain was Ivan Tsikhan and fencer Alexander Romankov carried the national flag during the opening ceremonies. Overall, Belarus took home 19 medals, with four medals being gold, placing 16th in the medal standings, 13th in the total medal count. At a ceremony bestowing state decorations on the Olympic champions President Lukashenko said his country had performed better in Beijing than they did in Athens, but he still called the Games a "missed opportunity", winning fewer gold medals than he personally had expected. However, on September 21, the IOC has asked Vadim Devyatovskiy and Ivan Tsikhan to provide the body information on why they tested positive for abnormal traces of testosterone after the completion of the hammerthrow final on August 17. If found guilty, the pair will be stripped of their respective medals and Devyatovskiy will face a lifetime ban for a second doping offense. The IOC found them guilty on December 11 and officially stripped them of their medals. 10 June 2010 – The Court of Arbitration for Sport (CAS) has upheld the appeals filed by the two Belarusian hammer throwers, Vadim Devyatovskiy and Ivan Tsikhan, against the decision of the Disciplinary Commission of the International Olympic Committee (IOC) of 11 December 2008. Consequently, the silver and bronze medals won at the 2008 Olympic Games in Beijing are to be returned to Vadim Deviyatovskiy and Ivan Tsikhan respectively. In 2012 IAAF retested doping samples from the 2005 World Athletics Championships and shotputter Andrei Mikhnevich was found positive for 3 anabolic steroids: Clenbuterol, Methandienone and Oxandrolone. In August 2014 IOC disqualified his results from the 2008 Summer Olympics and allocated the bronze medal.

=== 2012 London ===
Belarus won two gold medals at the 2012 games in London, the first being for Sergei Martynov in the men's 50m rifle prone shooting. Mixed doubles tennis players Max Mirnyi and Victoria Azarenka won the other gold, with Azarenka also winning a bronze in the women's singles.

== Winter Olympic Games ==
=== 1994 Lillehammer ===
This was the first Olympic Games in which an independent Belarus participated. Before competing as an independent state, Belarusian athletes won four medals as part of the USSR and CIS squads from Olympic Games spanning 1964 to 1992. Belarus sent 33 athletes to compete in seven disciplines. Silver medals were won by Igor Zhelezovski in the 1000 m speed skating and Svetlana Paramygina in the biathlon. Out of the 67 nations that competed, Belarus ranked 15th in the medal totals. According to the NOC RB, competing in the Lillehammer Olympics is a historic event for Belarus and "opened a new page in the history of Belarusian sport."

=== 1998 Nagano ===
Belarus sent a delegation of 59 athletes to compete in nine disciplines. Belarus medaled twice, both times with bronze. The medals were earned by Dmitry Dashchinsky in aerials and Alexei Aidarov in the biathlon. Belarus qualified for the second round of the hockey tournament, but lost its group matches and was eliminated by Russia in the quarterfinals, finishing seventh overall. In a speech by President Alexander Lukashenko in 2002, he reflected on the achievements of athletes in the Nagano Games. While watching the events, he stated that the Belarusian athletes competed with dignity and brought glory to Belarus.

=== 2002 Salt Lake City ===
Belarus competed in nine disciplines, just like at the 1998 Winter Olympics. Belarus's single medal was a bronze won by Aleksei Grishin. The men's ice hockey team drew international attention for its upset of top-seeded Sweden and subsequent 4th-place finish. However, hockey team member Vasily Pankov, along with Belarusian team doctor Evgeni Lositski, were removed from the Olympic Games due to positive doping results. Lositski was barred from coming to the 2004 and 2006 Olympic Games for giving Pankov medication that included nandrolone. Another Belarusian athlete was given a "strong warning" by the IOC for missing a doping test and admonished the NOC RB for helping her miss the test.

=== 2006 Turin ===
Sending 33 athletes, Belarus competed in eight disciplines. Dmitry Dashchinsky took home the only medal, a silver in the aerials. Dashchinsky had earned a bronze medal at the 1998 Nagano Games. The result was upsetting to Alexander Lukashenko, President of Belarus and head of the National Olympic Committee. He told members of the NOC RB that the coaches were to blame for the poor showing and that Belarus needed victories so they could feel pride as a nation. He also told the assembled members that if there are any more poor showings, he will fire the members.

=== 2010 Vancouver ===
Belarus won three medals. Alexei Grishin took the nation's first-ever gold in freestyle skiing – men's aerials. Sergey Novikov took silver in the men's 20-kilometers individual biathlon, while Darya Domracheva took bronze in the women's 15-kilometer individual biathlon. The men's hockey team was eliminated in the first round of playoffs.

=== 2014 Sochi ===
Belarus ranked 8th, its highest at any Olympic Games, after winning five golds and a bronze. Biathlete Darya Domracheva won three golds, in the women's pursuit, individual and mass start events. Nadzeya Skardzina won the bronze in the individual. In freestyle skiing, Alla Tsuper and Anton Kushnir won golds in the respective women's and men's aerial events.

== Flag bearers ==
| Games | Name |
|---|---|
| 1994 Lillehammer | Igor Zhelezovsky |
| 1996 Atlanta | Igor Astapkovich |
| 1998 Nagano | Alexandr Popov |
| 2000 Sydney | Sergey Lishtvan |
| 2002 Salt Lake City | Oleg Ryzhenkov |
| 2004 Athens | Aleksandr Medved |
| 2006 Turin | Alexandr Popov |
| 2008 Beijing | Alexander Romankov |
| 2010 Vancouver | Oleg Antonenko |
| 2012 London | Max Mirnyi |
| 2014 Sochi | Aleksei Grishin |
| 2016 Rio de Janeiro | Vasil Kiryienka |
| 2018 Pyeongchang | Alla Tsuper |
| 2020 Tokyo | Hanna Marusava & Mikita Tsmyh |

== National Olympic Committee ==
In 1991, an order was issued to create the National Olympic Committee of the Republic of Belarus (Russian: Национальный олимпийский комитет Республики Беларусь), but it was not until 1993 before the NOC RB (НОК РБ) became a full member of the International Olympic Committee. Also in 1993, Vladimir Ryzhenkov, who was at the time the Belarus Minister for Sport and Tourism, was elected to the post of President of the NOC RB. In May 1997, a year after Ryzhenkov's death, President of Belarus Alexander Lukashenko was elected to the post, which he still holds today. Lukashenko is the first known example of a head of state to also lead a National Olympic Committee at the same time. Funding for the NOC RB comes from marketing of goods with the Olympic logo, donations from the private sector, sponsorships, and from the national government. As head of state, President Lukashenko has issued decrees regarding awards to those who bring home medals. For the 2004 and 2006 Olympic Games the tax-free monetary awards were: US$60,000 for gold, US$30,000 for silver, and US$20,000 for bronze. For the 2008 and 2010 games, awards were: US$100,000 for gold, US$50,000 for silver, and US$30,000 for bronze.

== See also ==
- List of flag bearers for Belarus at the Olympics
- Belarus at the Paralympics
- Belarus at the Youth Olympics
