= Joanne Turvey =

British rower

Jo Turvey
Personal information
- Full name: Joanne Turvey
- Nationality: British
- Born: 6 July 1969 (age 56) Isleworth, West London
- Spouse: Andrew White
- Children: Charlie Finn White

Sport
- Club: Tideway Scullers School

Joanne Sarah Turvey (married name Joanne White; born 6 July 1969, in Isleworth) is a former British rower who competed at the 1992 Summer Olympics and 1996 Summer Olympics.

== Rowing career ==
Turvey was selected by Great Britain for the women's coxless pair with Miriam Batten at the 1992 Olympic Games in Barcelona, the pair finished in fifth place. She won double bronze in the single sculls and quadruple sculls at the 1995 National Championships.

The second of her Olympic Games appearances came at the 1996 Summer Olympics in Atlanta when she was selected in the women's eight. The team which consisted of Turvey, Miriam Batten, Annamarie Stapleton, Lisa Eyre, Dot Blackie, Kate Pollitt, Cath Bishop, Alison Gill and Suzie Ellis finished in seventh place.
