= Miriam Batten =

British rower (born 1964)

Miriam Batten MBE
Personal information
- Nationality: British
- Born: 4 November 1964 (age 61) Dartford, Kent

Sport
- Club: Southampton University BC; Thames RC
Medal record
Women's rowing
Representing Great Britain
Olympic Games
Silver medal – second place	2000 Sydney	Quadruple sculls
World Rowing Championships
Gold medal – first place	1998 Cologne	Double sculls
Silver medal – second place	1997 Aiguebelette	Double sculls

Miriam Luke MBE (née Batten; born 4 November 1964) is a former British rower who competed at three Olympic Games and winning a silver medal in 2000.

== Rowing career ==
Batten was a member of the Southampton University Boat Club whilst she studied at the University of Southampton. Batten was part of the coxless fours with Kate Grose, Kareen Marwick and Caroline Christie that won the national title rowing for the British squad at the 1990 National Championships.

The first of three Olympic Games appearances came at the 1992 Summer Olympics in Barcelona when she was selected for the coxless pair with Joanne Turvey. The pair finished in fifth place. The second of three Olympic Games appearances came at the 1996 Summer Olympics in Atlanta when she was selected in the women's eight. The team which consisted of Batten, Annamarie Stapleton, Lisa Eyre, Dot Blackie, Kate Pollitt, Cath Bishop, Joanne Turvey, Alison Gill and Suzie Ellis finished in seventh place.

In 1997 she represented Great Britain at the 1997 World Rowing Championships in Lac d'Aiguebelette and won a silver medal in the double scull with Scot Gillian Lindsay. The following year she represented Britain again at the 1998 World Rowing Championships in Cologne and this time won a gold medal in the double scull with Gillian Lindsay.

Her most prestigious moment came in her third Olympics at the 2000 Summer Olympics in Sydney. She competed in the quadruple scull and won a silver medal with her younger sister Guin Batten.

On 3 June 2012, Batten was amongst the rowers (with her sister, Guin Batten) on the Gloriana at the start of the Thames Diamond Jubilee Pageant.

Batten was appointed Member of the Order of the British Empire (MBE) in the 2024 New Year Honours for services to women's rowing.

== Personal life ==
She is married to David Luke, who works as a physical education teacher at Chiltern Edge Secondary School. She is a Vice President of Thames Rowing Club, the club which she represented during her international competitive career, President of Henley Rowing Club, and a member of Upper Thames Rowing Club. She was appointed Chairman of the Henley Women's Regatta in 2012. In December 2016 she was appointed as a Steward of Henley Royal Regatta.
