= Maria Maunder =

Canadian rower

Personal information
- National team: Canada
- Citizenship: Canadian
- Born: March 19, 1972 (age 54) St. John's, Newfoundland and Labrador
- Education: University of Western Ontario
- Other interests: Swimming

Sport
- Sport: Rowing
- Former partners: Heather McDermid, Alison Korn, Jessica Monroe, Tosha Tsang, Emma Robinson, Anna van der Kamp, Theresa Luke, Lesley Thompson-Willie
- Retired: 1999

Achievements and titles
- Olympic finals: 1996
Medal record
Representing Canada
Olympic Games
Silver medal – second place	1996 Atlanta	Eight
Summer Universiade
Gold medal – first place	1993 Buffalo	Eight
Silver medal – second place	1993 Buffalo	Quadruple sculls

Maria Maunder (born 19 March 1972) is a Canadian rower. Maunder was a member of the Canadian national team that placed second in the 1996 Summer Olympics and earned a silver medal.

== Early life and education ==
Maunder graduated from the preparatory school Ridley College in 1990 and matriculated to the University of Western Ontario. Though she went to the Olympics for rowing, she also swam, winning gold in the 50 and 200 meter free races under the Ontario Federation of School Athletic Associations during secondary school. At university, she participated in swimming and rowing. During that time, she also joined the university's chapter of the sorority Alpha Gamma Delta.

== Career ==
Maunder competed in her first major international tournament in 1994 at the Commonwealth Rowing Championships in Thames Centre, Ontario, Canada. Her women's eight team placed seventh at that year's World Championships in Indianapolis, USA, while her coxless fours team placed eighth. In 1995, her eights team won sixth place at the Championships in Tampere, Finland, while her coxless pairs team finished fifth. During the 1996 Summer Olympics, her team came in second and won a silver medal. Her quadruple sculls team placed sixth at the 1997 World Championships in Aiguebelette-le-Lac, France. In that year's Head of the Charles Regatta in Cambridge, Massachusetts, she placed first in the single scull event, as well as the singles and doubles for Canada's team at the Henley Royal Regatta in England. During the 1998 World Championships in Cologne, Germany, she finished eleventh in the double sculls. This race would be her last official competition, as she retired the following year.

Listed below are a selected number of her major races and the results:

Event (year)	Location	Team	Race	Rank	Final Time
1994 World Rowing Championships	Indianapolis, USA	Canada	Women's eight	1	6:11.57
1995 World Rowing Championships	Tampere, Finland	Canada	Women's eight	6	7:00.69
1996 Summer Olympics	Atlanta, USA	Canada	Women's eight	2 (silver medal)	6:24.05
1997 World Rowing Championships	Aiguebelette, France	Canada	Women's Quadruple Sculls	6	6.28.18
1997 Head of the Charles Regatta	Cambridge, USA		Women's Singles	1	
1998 World Rowing Championships	Cologne, Germany	Canada	Women's Double Sculls	5	7:09.88
