= Lavrinenko =

Lavrinenko (may be spelled as Lawrinenko, Lavrynenko, Lavrenenko, Lavrinenco) is a Ukrainian surname. Notable people with the surname include:

- Aleksandr Lavrinenko (born 1961), Ukrainian sport shooter
- Aleksey Lavrinenko (born 1955), Russian politician
- Nataliya Lavrinenko (born 1977), Belarus rower
- Serhiy Lavrynenko (born 1975), Ukrainian footballer
- Yuri Lavrynenko (born 1977), Ukrainian footballer
