= McCagg =

McCagg is a surname. Notable people with the surname include:

- David McCagg (born 1958), American swimmer
- Elizabeth McCagg (born 1967), American rower
- Mary McCagg (born 1967), American rower
