= Rita de Jong =

Dutch rower (born 1965)

Medal record

Women's rowing

Representing the Netherlands

World Rowing Championships
Gold medal – first place	1994 Indianapolis	W4-
Bronze medal – third place	1995 Tampere	W8+

Rita de Jong (born 12 March 1965 in Meerkerk) is a Dutch rower. She competed at the 1992 Summer Olympics as a member of the Netherlands women's double sculls team which finished in 10th place and at the 1996 Summer Olympics as a member of the women's eight team which finished in 6th place.

== See also ==
- Netherlands at the 1992 Summer Olympics#Rowing
- Netherlands at the 1996 Summer Olympics#Rowing
