= Astrid van Koert =

Dutch rower

Astrid van Koert (born 7 July 1970, in 's-Hertogenbosch) is a Dutch rower. She competed at the 1996 Summer Olympics as a member of the Netherlands women's women's eight team which finished in 6th place.
