= List of flag bearers for Belarus at the Olympics =

Belarus at the Olympics
- IOC code: BLR
- NOC: Belarus Olympic Committee
- Website: www.noc.by (in Russian and English)
- Medals: Gold 21 Silver 37 Bronze 47 Total 105

Summer appearances
- 1996; 2000; 2004; 2008; 2012; 2016; 2020; 2024

Winter appearances
- 1994; 1998; 2002; 2006; 2010; 2014; 2018; 2022; 2026; 2030

Other related appearances
- Russian Empire (1900–1912); Poland (1924–1936); Soviet Union (1952–1988); Unified Team (1992); Individual Neutral Athletes (2024)

This is a list of flag bearers who have represented Belarus at the Olympics.

Flag bearers carry the national flag of their country at the opening ceremony of the Olympic Games.

#	Event year	Season	Flag bearer	Sport
1	1994	Winter	Igor Zhelezovsky	Speed skating
2	1996	Summer	Igor Astapkovich	Athletics
3	1998	Winter	Alexandr Popov	Biathlon
4	2000	Summer	Sergey Lishtvan	Wrestling
5	2002	Winter	Oleg Ryzhenkov	Biathlon
6	2004	Summer	Aleksandr Medved	Wrestling
7	2006	Winter	Alexandr Popov	Biathlon
8	2008	Summer	Aleksandr Romankov	Fencing
9	2010	Winter	Oleg Antonenko	Ice hockey
10	2012	Summer	Max Mirnyi	Tennis
11	2014	Winter	Alexei Grishin	Freestyle skiing
12	2016	Summer	Vasil Kiryienka	Cycling
13	2018	Winter	Alla Tsuper	Freestyle skiing
14	2020	Summer	Hanna Marusava	Archery
14	2020	Summer	Mikita Tsmyh	Swimming
15	2022	Winter	Ignat Golovatsiuk	Speed skating
15	2022	Winter	Hanna Nifantava	Speed skating

== See also ==
- Belarus at the Olympics
