= Volchek =

Volchek (Russian: Во́лчек) is a Russian and Belarusian surname. Notable people with the surname include:

- Galina Volchek (1933–2019), Soviet and Russian theater and film director, actress, and teacher
- Nataliya Volchek (born 1972), Belarusian rower

== See also ==
- Volchok
