= Emma Robinson (rower) =

Canadian rower (born 1971)

Personal information
- Born: November 26, 1971 (age 54) Montreal, Quebec
- Education: University of Toronto M.D.
- Height: 183 cm (6 ft 0 in)
- Weight: 70 kg (154 lb)
Medal record
Women's rowing
Representing Canada
Olympic Games
Silver medal – second place	1996 Atlanta	Eight
Bronze medal – third place	2000 Sydney	Eight
World Championships
Gold medal – first place	1997 Aiguebelette	Coxless pair
Gold medal – first place	1998 Cologne	Coxless pair
Gold medal – first place	1999 St. Catharines	Coxless pair
Silver medal – second place	1997 Aiguebelette	Eight
Bronze medal – third place	1993 Račice	Coxless four
Bronze medal – third place	1998 Cologne	Eight
Bronze medal – third place	1999 St. Catharines	Eight
Pan American Games
Gold medal – first place	1999 Winnipeg	Coxless pair
Summer Universiade
Gold medal – first place	1993 Buffalo	Eight
Silver medal – second place	1993 Buffalo	Coxless fours

Emma Robinson (born November 26, 1971) is a Canadian rower. Robinson won two medals (silver and bronze) at the Summer Olympics as part of the women's eight rowing teams for Canada in 1996 in Atlanta and the 2000 Summer Olympics in Sydney. Robinson is also a three time world champion in the women's coxless pairs, when she won gold from 1997 to 1999, she has an additional silver medal, and three bronze, for a total of seven World Rowing Championships medals. She was named the Pairs Team of the Year at the National Sports Awards, winning in 1997 with Alison Korn and in 1999 with Theresa Luke.

== Career ==
Robinson won her first World Rowing Championship medal in 1993 as part of the women's coxless four that won bronze for Canada. Competing in the 1996 Summer Olympics, she rowed with Anna Van der Kamp in the coxless pairs but finished fifth in the final. Robinson won a silver though as part of the women's eight at those Olympics. At the next three Rowing World Championships she won the gold medal, first with Alison Korn in 1997 and 1998, and finally with Theresa Luke in 1999. Robinson overcame a thyroid cancer surgery in March 1999, despite the major health concern she competed on the women's eight team that won bronze at the 2000 Summer Olympics in Sydney. As the reigning three-time World Champions, Robinson and Luke were a medal favourite going into the women's coxless pairs in Sydney. That year though, they had struggled in races against the Romanian and Australian teams, ultimately the pair finished fourth at the Olympics. After the disappointing finish and recovery from cancer, Robinson stopped competing in the coxless pairs and instead only rowed on the Canadian women's eight team in 2001 before retiring.

== Personal ==
Born in Montreal, Robinson grew up in Winnipeg, Manitoba. She went to high school at St. John's-Ravenscourt School in Winnipeg, graduating in 1989, and was named to the school's Sports Hall of Fame in 2009. Robinson went on to row and study at the University of Toronto where she studied medicine, completing her studies in 2002, and then going on to two years of residency as a physician. She was inducted to the U of T's Sports Hall of Fame in 2006. After her rowing career ended, she has worked as a radiologist in Belleville, Ontario.
