= Averești =

Averești may refer to several villages in Romania:

- Averești, a village in Ion Creangă Commune, Neamț County
- Averești, a village in Bunești-Averești Commune, Vaslui County
