= Bronwyn Thompson (rower) =

Australian rower

Personal information
- Born: 28 January 1973 (age 52)
- Height: 6 ft 0 in (183 cm)
- Weight: 74 kg (163 lb)

Bronwyn Thompson (born 28 January 1973) is an Australian rower who competed at the 1996 Atlanta and 2000 Sydney Olympics in the women's eight. She attended Ballarat Grammar from 1985 to 1990.
