= Volchok =

Volchok (Russian: Волчок) is a Russian surname. Notable people with the surname include:

- Igor Volchok (1931–2016), Russian football manager
- Zollie Volchok (1916–2012), American businessman and basketball executive

== Fictional characters ==
- Kevin Volchok, character in The O.C.

== See also ==
Volchek
