= Tessa Knaven =

Dutch rower (born 1971)

Medal record

Women's rowing

Representing the Netherlands

World Rowing Championships
Bronze medal – third place	1995 Tampere	W8+

Tessa Knaven (born 4 December 1971 in Arnhem) is a Dutch rower. She finished sixth in the women's eight at the 1996 Summer Olympics.
