= Karina Wieland =

Australian rower

Personal information
- Full name: Karina Nicole Wieland
- Nationality: Australian
- Born: 2 September 1974 (age 50); Geelong, Victoria, Australia

Sport
- Sport: Rowing

Karina Nicole Wieland (born 2 September 1974) is an Australian rower. She competed in the women's eight event at the 1996 Summer Olympics.

Competition Results
Name of Competition	Location	Position	Class	Time
1998 World Rowing Cup III	Lucerne	6	W8+	6:49.790
1998 World Rowing Cup II	Hazewinkel	2	W4-	06:39.060
1998 World Rowing Cup II	Hazewinkel	2	W8+	06:09.400
1996 Olympic Games	Atlanta	5	W8+	06:30.100
1995 World Rowing Championships	Tampere	4	W4-	07:11.500
