= Antje Rehaag =

German rower

Personal information
- Nationality: German
- Born: 1 August 1965 (age 60) Hofheim am Taunus, West Germany

Sport
- Sport: Rowing
Medal record
Women's rowing
Representing Germany
World Championships
Gold medal – first place	1994 Indianapolis	Women's eight

Antje Rehaag (born 1 August 1965) is a German former rower. She won gold with the women's eight at the 1994 World Rowing Championships in Indianapolis, USA, and competed in the women's eight event at the 1996 Summer Olympics.

== Personal life ==
Rehaag is married to Dutch former rower and two-time Olympic gold medallist Ronald Florijn and is the mother of two Olympic gold medallist rowers Karolien Florijn and Finn Florijn.
