= Catriona Fallon =

American rower (born 1970)

Personal information
- Born: August 8, 1970 (age 55) Burlingame, California, United States

Sport
- Sport: Rowing
Medal record
Representing United States
World Rowing Championships
Gold medal – first place	1995 Tampere	W8+
Silver medal – second place	1993 Račice	W8+
Silver medal – second place	1994 Indianapolis	W8+
Silver medal – second place	1994 Indianapolis	W4-
Pan American Games
Silver medal – second place	1991 Havana	W4-

Catriona Mary Fallon (born August 8, 1970) is a former American rower. She won the World Championships in 1995 and finished 4th in the women's eight at the 1996 Summer Olympics.

Fallon received an M.B.A. from Harvard Business School and a B.A. in economics from UCLA. Following her retirement from rowing, she has pursued a career in business.
