= Ina Justh =

German rower

Personal information
- Nationality: German
- Born: 19 December 1969 (age 55); Großenhain, East Germany

Sport
- Sport: Rowing

Ina Justh (born 19 December 1969) is a German rower. She competed in the women's eight event at the 1996 Summer Olympics.
