= Marleen van der Velden =

Dutch rower

Personal information
- Full name: Marlene Catelyne van der Velden
- Nationality: Dutch
- Born: 12 July 1970 (age 54); Likasi, Congo

Sport
- Sport: Rowing

Marlene Catelyne van der Velden (born 12 July 1970) is a Dutch rower. She competed in the women's eight event at the 1996 Summer Olympics.
