= Andrea Gesch =

German rower

Personal information
- Full name: Andrea Martina Gesch
- Nationality: German
- Born: 5 October 1973 (age 51); Hennigsdorf, East Germany

Sport
- Sport: Rowing

Andrea Martina Gesch (born 5 October 1973) is a German former rower. She competed in the women's eight event at the 1996 Summer Olympics.
