= Micaela Schmidt =

German rower

Personal information
- Nationality: German
- Born: 25 January 1970 (age 55); Karl-Marx-Stadt, East Germany

Sport
- Sport: Rowing

Micaela Schmidt (later Schmidt-Kubicki; born 25 January 1970) is a German rower. She competed in the women's eight event at the 1996 Summer Olympics.
