= Anne Kakela =

American rower

Medal record

Women's rowing

Representing United States

World Rowing Championships
Gold medal – first place	1995 Tampere	W8+
Silver medal – second place	1993 Račice	W8+
Silver medal – second place	1993 Račice	W4-
Silver medal – second place	1994 Indianapolis	W8+
Silver medal – second place	1994 Indianapolis	W4-

Anne Kakela (born June 22, 1970, in Steamboat Springs, Colorado) is an American rower. She finished 4th in the women's eight at the 1996 Summer Olympics.

She is now a coach for the US National rowing team.
