= Kathleen Naser =

German rower

Personal information
- Nationality: German
- Born: 31 July 1975 (age 49); Brandenburg an der Havel, East Germany

Sport
- Sport: Rowing

Kathleen Naser (born 31 July 1975) is a German rower. She competed in the women's eight event at the 1996 Summer Olympics.
