= Gina Douglas =

Australian rower

Personal information
- Full name: Georgina Caroline Douglas
- Born: 30 October 1972 (age 52); Melbourne, Victoria, Australia
- Height: 6 ft 0 in (183 cm)
- Weight: 80 kg (176 lb)

Georgina Caroline "Gina" Douglas (married name Peele, born 30 October 1972) is an Australian rower who competed at two Olympic Games.

She competed at the 1996 Atlanta in the women's eight and the 2000 Sydney Olympics in the women's single scull, finishing 5th in both events.

Her father David Douglas was also an Olympic rower for Australia, who won the silver medal in the men's eight at Mexico City in 1968.
