= Jissy de Wolf =

Dutch rower (born 1972)

Personal information
- Nationality: Dutch
- Born: 3 March 1972 (age 53); Sneek, Netherlands

Sport
- Sport: Rowing

Jissy de Wolf (born 3 March 1972) is a Dutch rower. She competed in the women's eight event at the 1996 Summer Olympics.
