= Muriel van Schilfgaarde =

Dutch rower

Personal information
- Nationality: Dutch
- Born: 10 May 1968 (age 58) Linschoten, Netherlands

Sport
- Sport: Rowing

Muriel van Schilfgaarde (born 10 May 1968) is a Dutch rower. She competed in the women's eight event at the 1996 Summer Olympics.
