= Anca Tănase =

Romanian rower

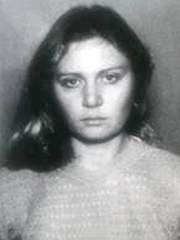

Personal information
- Born: 15 March 1968 (age 58) Buneşti, Romania
- Height: 181 cm (5 ft 11 in)
- Weight: 73 kg (161 lb)

Sport
- Sport: Rowing
Medal record
Representing Romania
Olympic Games
Gold medal – first place	1996 Atlanta	W8+
World Rowing Championships
Gold medal – first place	1989 Bled	W8+
Bronze medal – third place	1994 Indianapolis	W8+
Silver medal – second place	1995 Tampere	W8+
Gold medal – first place	1997 Aiguebelette	W8+
Silver medal – second place	1997 Aiguebelette	W4-

Anca Tănase (born 15 March 1968) is a retired Romanian rower. She was part of the Romanian eights that won gold medals at the 1996 Olympics and 1989 and 1997 world championships, placing second in 1995 and third in 1994. She is married to the Olympic rower Iulică Ruican.
