= Carmen Klomp-Wearne =

Australian rower (born 1975)

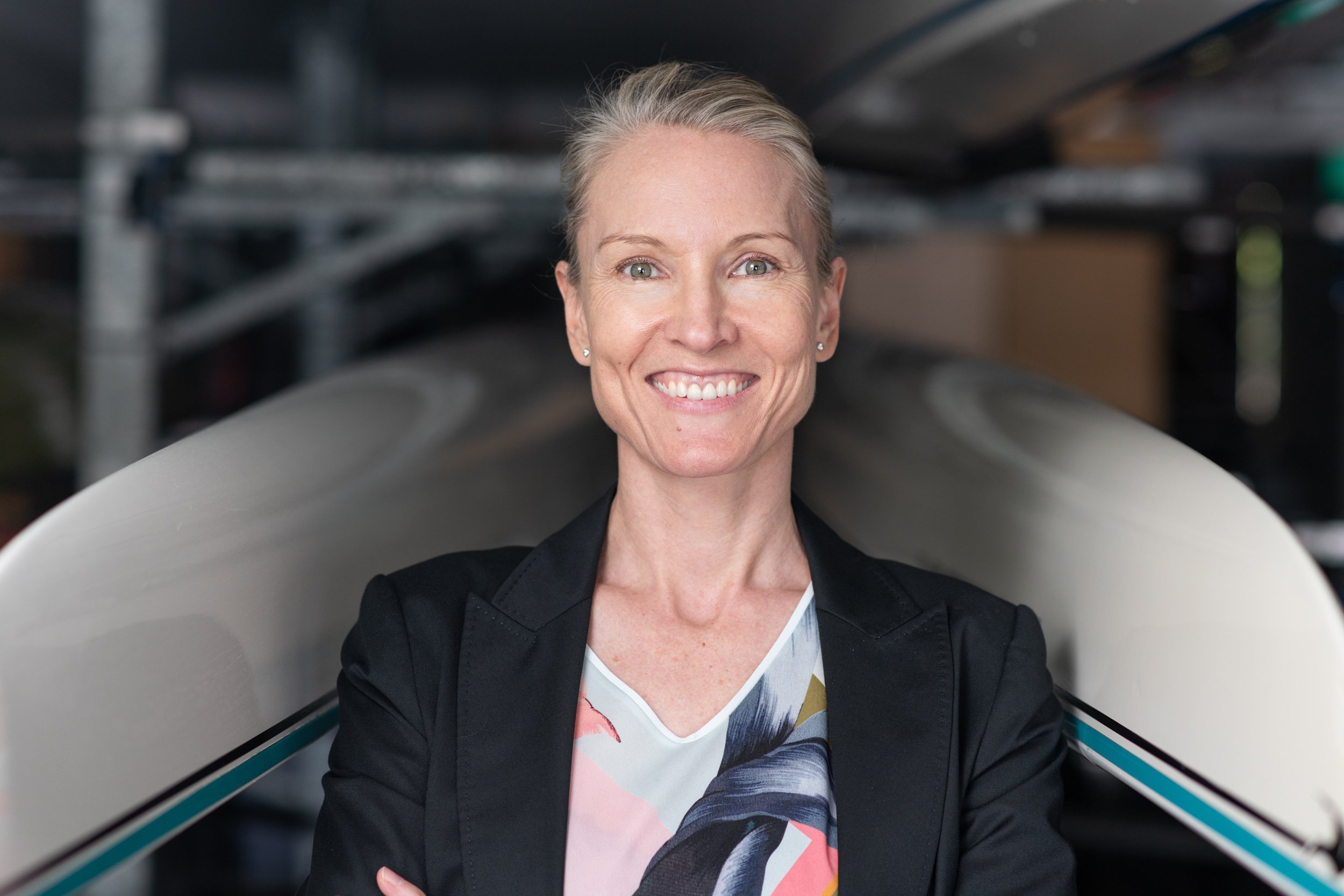

Personal information
- Citizenship: Australian
- Born: 14 May 1975 (age 51)

Sport
- Country: Australia
- Sport: Rowing
- Club: Port Adelaide Rowing Club
Medal record
Women's rowing
Representing Australia
World Rowing Championships
Bronze medal – third place	1994 Indianapolis	W2-
Junior World Rowing Championships
Silver medal – second place	1992 Montreal	JW2X
Commonwealth Games
Gold medal – first place	1994 Commonwealth Games	W2-
Silver medal – second place	1994 Commonwealth Games	W8+

Carmen Klomp-Wearne (born 14 May 1975 in Adelaide) is an Australian Olympic. She was a four-time national champion and winner of 4 Gold, 3 Silver and 5 Bronze medals at International levels, including a bronze medal at the 1994 World Rowing Championships and Gold at the 1994 Commonwealth Games.

== Club and state rowing ==
Raised in South Australia Carmen Klomp's senior rowing club rowing was initially from the Port Adelaide Rowing Club and later the Riverside Rowing Club in Adelaide.

She first contested the Australian Rowing Championships in 1991 when she won the U19 national single scull title from her Port Adelaide teammate Anna Ozolins with whom she would go on to row at state and national representative levels.

She made her first state representative appearance for South Australia in the 1991 women's youth four which contested and won the Bicentennial Cup at the Interstate Regatta within the Australian Rowing Championships. In 1992 she rowed again in the South Australian youth four. In 1994 she stepped up into the South Australian senior women's four which won that year won the ULVA Trophy at the Interstate Regatta. She rowed in five consecutive South Australian women's fours from 1994 to 1998, stroking the crew in 1995 and rowing to a second ULVA Trophy victory in the bow seat of the 1996 SA four.

Klomp rowed in the five seat of the South Australian women's eight when in 1999 the women's heavyweight event at the Interstate Regatta switched into eights. That SA crew placed third and Klomp held her seat in the eight in 2000 and 2001 when the SA women's eights placed second and fifth.

== International representative rowing ==
Klomp and Ozolins made their Australian representative debut together in a double scull contesting the 1991 Junior World Rowing Championships in Banyoles. They rowed to a fifth placing. The following year at the 1992 Junior World Rowing Championships in Montreal, Ozolins and Klomp rowed the double scull to a silver medal.

At the 1994 World Rowing Championships in Indianapolis Klomp and Ozolins rowed the coxless pair to a bronze medal and were seated together in the stern end of the Australian women's eight who finished in sixth place. In 1995 the stern five of the eight were all South Australians including Klomp still in the seven seat. They missed the A final and finished in eight place.

In 1994 Klomp also rowed in the Commonwealth Games set at Victoria, Canada, winning gold in a coxless pair with Ozolins, coming ahead of England and Canada. She also doubled up, getting silver in a coxed women's eight.

Other than some seat changes that eight of 1994 and 1995 was largely unchanged for the 1996 Atlanta Olympics and Klomp remained at seven seat. The crew with an average age of 22, had to qualify for the Games through the qualification regatta in Lucerne (SUI). The Olympic crew placed fifth in the final, marking Australia's first Women's eight to reach an Olympic final. This result was excellent when compared to the experience in the other crews.

In 2000 Klomp-Wearne made another tilt at Olympic selection and rowed in a double scull at the World Rowing Cup II in Vienna. It was her last Australian representative appearance.
