= Femke Boelen =

Dutch rower (born 1968)

Personal information
- Born: 5 May 1968 (age 58) Amsterdam, Netherlands
- Height: 1.83 m (6 ft 0 in)
- Weight: 68 kg (150 lb)

Sport
- Sport: Rowing
- Club: Willem III, Amsterdam
Medal record
Representing the Netherlands
Women's rowing
World Championships
Gold medal – first place	1994 Indianapolis	Coxless four
Bronze medal – third place	1995 Tampere	Eight

Femke Boelen (pronounced [ˈfɛmkə ˈbulə(n)]; born 5 May 1968) is a retired Dutch rower. She won a gold medal in the women's coxless four at the 1994 World Rowing Championships, a bronze medal in the women's eight at the 1995 World Rowing Championships. She finished in sixth place in the women's eight at the 1996 Summer Olympics.

Boelen retired from competitions in 1997 and worked as a coach at her rowing club Willem III in Amsterdam. Her father Herman is also an Olympic rower and rowing coach, while her husband is rower Hans Lycklama.
