= Anja Pyritz =

German rower (born 1970)

Personal information
- National team: Germany
- Born: 31 August 1970 (age 55) Kühlungsborn, East Germany

Sport
- Sport: Rowing
Medal record
Women's rowing
Representing Germany
World Rowing Championships
| Gold medal – first place | 2003 Milan | W8+ |
| Bronze medal – third place | 2001 Lucerne | W8+ |
| Bronze medal – third place | 2002 Seville | W8+ |

Anja Pyritz (born 31 August 1970 in Kühlungsborn) is a German rower.
