= Anna Ozolins =

Australian rower

Personal information
- Born: 12 May 1974 (age 52) Broken Hill, New South Wales

Sport
- Country: Australia
- Sport: Rowing
- Club: Port Adelaide Rowing Club
Medal record
Women's rowing
Representing Australia
World Rowing Championships
Bronze medal – third place	1994 Indianapolis	W2+
Junior World Rowing Championships
Silver medal – second place	1992 Montreal	JW2X

Anna Ozolins (born 12 May 1974 in Broken Hill, New South Wales) is an Australian former rower. She is a four-time national champion and an Australian representative oarswoman who won a bronze medal at the 1994 World Rowing Championships. She was the stroke of the Australian women's heavyweight eight from 1994 to 1995 and from 1998 to 1999.

== Club and state rowing ==
Ozolins' junior rowing was from the Port Adelaide Rowing Club and later the Adelaide Rowing Club.

She first contested the Australian Rowing Championships in 1991 when she placed second in the U19 national single scull title behind her Port Adelaide teammate Carmen Klomp-Wearne with whom she would go on to row at state and national representative levels.

She made her first state representative appearance for South Australia, one month after her seventeenth birthday in the 1991 women's four which contested the ULVA Trophy at the Interstate Regatta within the Australian Rowing Championships. In 1992 she rowed in the South Australian youth four.

In 1994 she was back in the South Australian senior women's four which that year won the ULVA Trophy at the Interstate Regatta and was again in the SA four in 1995. In 1997 Ozolins took a scholarship to the Australian Institute of Sport and that year stroked the Australian Capital Territory women's four at the Interstate Regatta.

In 1999 the women's heavyweight event at the Interstate Regatta switched into coxed eights. Ozolins stroked the 2001 South Australian eight to a fifth placing.

== International representative rowing ==
Ozolins and Klomp made their Australian representative debut together in a double scull contesting the 1991 Junior World Rowing Championships in Banyoles. They rowed to a fifth placing. The following year at the 1992 Junior World Rowing Championships in Montreal, Ozolins and Klomp rowed the double scull to a silver medal.

At the 1994 World Rowing Championships in Indianapolis Ozolins and Klomp rowed the coxless pair to a bronze medal and were seated together in the stern end of the Australian women's eight who finished in sixth place. In 1995 the stern five of the eight were again all South Australians including Ozolins again at stroke. They missed the A final and finished in eight place.

Other than some seat changes that eight of 1994 and 1995 was largely unchanged for the 1996 Atlanta Olympics and Ozolins moved into the four seat. The crew with an average age of 22, had to qualify for the Games through the qualification regatta in Lucerne (SUI). The fifth placing in the final was better than predicted form and excellent when compared to the experience in the other crews.

Ozolins was back in Australian representative crews in 1998 and at two World Rowing Cups in Europe and at the 1998 World Rowing Championships in Cologne she stroked the eight and rowed in a coxless pair with Jodi Winter. At the World Championships the eight placed fourth and the pair seventh. She held her seat as stroke of the Australian women's eight into 1999 when she set the pace at the WRC III in Lucerne and then at the 1999 World Rowing Championships in St Catharines where in her last Australian appearance the eight finished in fifth place.
