= Aleksey Lavrinenko =

Russian politician

- Алексей Лавриненко
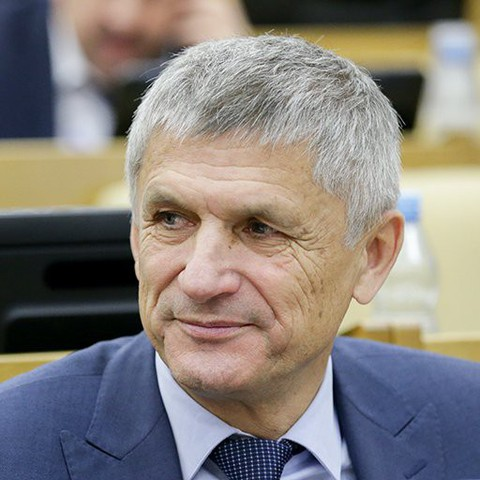

Deputy of the 8th State Duma
- Incumbent
- Assumed office 19 September 2021

Personal details
- Born: 20 August 1955 (age 71) Nikolina Balka, Petrovsky District, Stavropol Krai, Russian Soviet Federative Socialist Republic, USSR
- Party: United Russia
- Education: Stavropol State Agrarian University

Alexey Lavrinenko (Russian: Алексей Фёдорович Лавриненко; born August 20, 1955, Kazan) is a Russian political figure and a deputy of the 7th and 8th State Dumas.

From 1977 to 1989, he worked as a veterinarian in the Stavropol Krai. In 1996-2016, Lavrinenko was the chairman of the agricultural cooperative named after Iosif Apanasenko. In 2012, he was a confidant of the presidential candidate Vladimir Putin. In 2013, he was appointed co-chairman of the regional headquarters of the All-Russia People's Front in the Stavropol Krai. On September 18, 2016, he was elected deputy of the 7th State Duma. In 2021, Lavrinenko got re-elected for the 8th State Duma.

== Sanctions ==
He was sanctioned by the UK government in 2022 in relation to the Russo-Ukrainian War.

On 24 March 2022, the United States Treasury sanctioned him in response to the 2022 Russian invasion of Ukraine.
