= Bunești-Averești =

- Commune
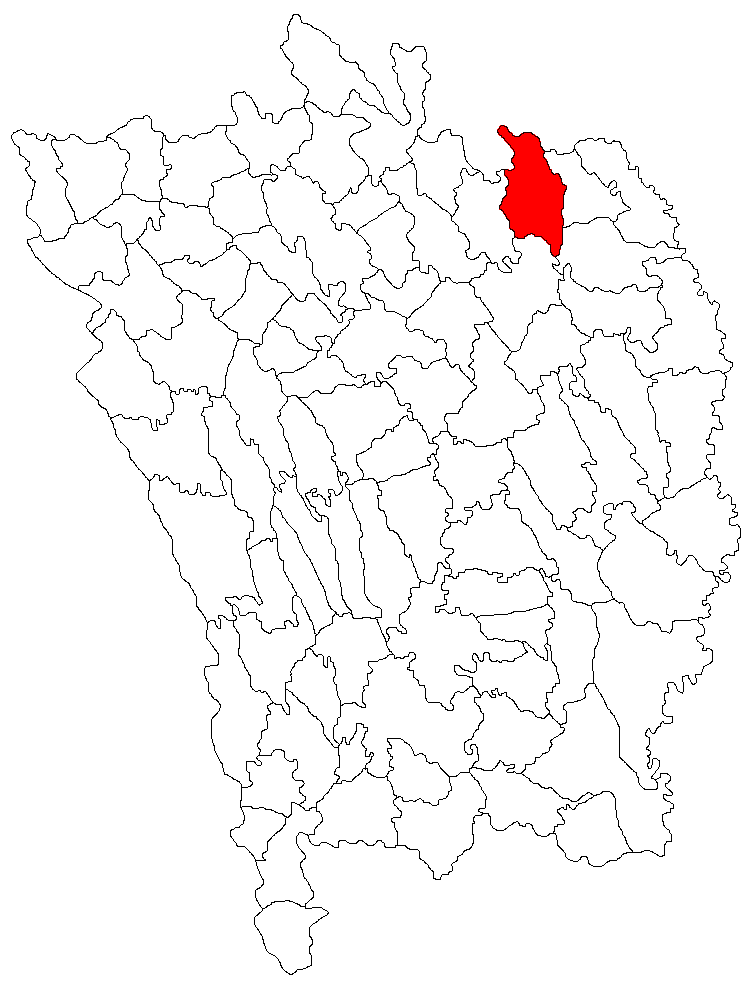
- Location in Vaslui County

- Location in Romania
- Coordinates: 46°50′N 27°58′E
- Country: Romania
- County: Vaslui
- Subdivisions: Armășeni, Averești, Bunești, Plopi, Podu Oprii, Roșiori, Tăbălăiești
- Population (2021-12-01): 2,088
- Time zone: EET/EEST (UTC+2/+3)
- Vehicle reg.: VS

Bunești-Averești is a commune in Vaslui County, Western Moldavia, Romania. It is composed of seven villages: Armășeni, Averești (the commune centre), Bunești, Plopi, Podu Oprii, Roșiori, and Tăbălăiești.

== Natives ==
- Anca Tănase (born 1968), rower
