= Inga Borodich =

Belarusian swimmer (born 1979)

Personal information
- Full name: Інга Генадзеўна Бородіч
- Born: 30 May 1979 (age 47) Kobryn, Belarusian SSR, USSR (now Belarus)

Sport
- Sport: Swimming

Inga Borodich or Inha Hyenadzyewna Borodich (Belarusian: Інга Генадзеўна Бородіч, born 30 May 1979) is a Belarusian freestyle swimmer. She competed in three events at the 1996 Summer Olympics.
