= Pavel Kavetsky =

Belarusian cyclist

Personal information
- Born: 15 January 1975 (age 51) Krasnoyarsk Birth Place

Cycling career
- Sport: Cycling

Pavel Kavetsky (born 15 January 1975) is a Belarusian cyclist. He competed in the men's individual road race at the 1996 Summer Olympics.
