= Marioara Popescu =

Romanian rower

Mărioara Popescu
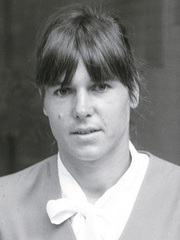

Personal information
- Born: 9 November 1962 (age 63) Corlăţeni, Romania
- Height: 177 cm (5 ft 10 in)
- Weight: 75 kg (165 lb)

Sport
- Sport: Rowing
Medal record
Representing Romania
Olympic Games
Gold medal – first place	1984 Los Angeles	Double sculls
Gold medal – first place	1996 Atlanta	Eight
World Rowing Championships
Gold medal – first place	1990 Tasmania	Eights
Gold medal – first place	1999 St. Catharines	Eights
Silver medal – second place	1985 Hazewinkel	Double sculls
Silver medal – second place	1996 Motherwell	Coxless fours
Bronze medal – third place	1983 Dusiburg	Double sculls
Bronze medal – third place	1987 Copenhagen	Single sculls
Bronze medal – third place	2000 Zagreb	Coxless fours
Summer Universiade
Gold medal – first place	1987 Zagreb	Single sculls

Mărioara Popescu (later Ciobanu; born 9 November 1962) is a retired Romanian rower. She competed at the 1984, 1988 and 1996 Olympics and won gold medals in 1984 and 1996. At the world championships she won seven medals between 1983 and 2000, including two gold medals in the eights in 1990 and 1999.
