= Vyacheslav Khamulkin =

Belarusian diver

Personal information
- Nationality: Belarusian
- Born: 1 February 1972 (age 53) Minsk, Belarus

Sport
- Sport: Diving

Vyacheslav Khamulkin (born 1 February 1972) is a Belarusian diver. He competed at the 1996 Summer Olympics and the 2000 Summer Olympics.
