= Kaylynn Fry =

Australian rowing cox

Kaylynn Maree Fry
Sport
- Country: Australia
- Club: Melbourne Uni Boat Club; Canberra Rowing Club

Achievements and titles
- Olympic finals: 1996 Atlanta 5th place
- National finals: ULVA Trophy 1982, 85, 87
Medal record
Women's rowing
Representing Australia
Commonwealth Games
Gold medal – first place	1986 Edinburgh	Women's eight
Silver medal – second place	1986 Edinburgh	Women's coxed four

Kaylynn Maree Fry is an Australian former rowing coxswain. She was a nine-time national champion, a representative at World Championships, a 1996 Olympian and Commonwealth Games gold medallist.

== Club and state rowing ==
Fry was educated at Methodist Ladies' College, Melbourne where she was introduced to rowing and coached by Australian national and senior Victorian coxswain Susie Palfreyman. Fry coxed an MLC crew which won the 1984 Victorian Public Schools' women's four.

Fry's senior coxing was with the Melbourne University Ladies Boat Club. During her Australian Institute of Sport scholarship years she rowed from the Canberra Rowing Club.

She first made state selection for Victoria in 1982 steering the senior women's four who contested and won the ULVA Trophy at the Interstate Regatta. She coxed further Victorian women's crews who won the ULVA Trophy in 1985 and 1987.

In 1982 and 1985 in MUBC colours she steered women's fours to national championship titles at the Australian Rowing Championships. In 1985 she was one of the first recipients of a scholarship to the Australian Institute of Sport. In 1986 she coxed crews representing the AIS to national titles - a women's four and the women's eight. She again coxed AIS crews in 1987 - the four won a national title and the eight placed third.

She made her last appearance at the Australian Rowing Championships in 1996 in the composite selection eight which was heading to the 1996 Olympics. That eight won the 1996 open women's eight Australian title.

== International representative rowing ==
Fry made her Australian representative debut in an U23 coxed four in the 1985 Trans-Tasman series. That crew lost both of their match races against New Zealand. For the 1986 Commonwealth Games Fry was in the stern of both Australian women's coxed boats. The eight rowed to a gold medal and the coxed four took silver. The four went on to the 1986 World Rowing Championships in Nottingham where they finished in seventh place.

Fry was Australia's senior women's coxswain for the five year period from 1986 to 1990. She steered the coxed four to a seventh place at the 1987 World Rowing Championships but no women's crews were sent to the 1988 Olympics and no coxed crew went to the 1989 World Championships. Fry was back at the 1990 World Rowing Championships on the rudder in the Australian women's eight who rowed to a seventh place.

Fry's scholarship with the AIS ended in 1991 and she retired from competitive racing but came out of retirement in 1996 and stepped into the stern of the Australian women's eight who went to the 1996 Atlanta Olympics and rowed to a fifth place in the Olympic final.

== Personal ==
Fry is married to Australian representative lightweight rower Bruce Hick and lives in Canberra.
