= Svetlana Zhidko =

Belarusian swimmer

Personal information
- Born: 15 May 1980 (age 46) Baranavichy, Byelorussian SSR, Soviet Union

Sport
- Sport: Swimming

Sviatlana (Svetlana) Zhidko (Belarusian: Святлана Жiдко, Russian: Светлана Жидко, born 15 May 1980 in Baranavichy) is a Belarusian freestyle swimmer. She competed in three events at the 1996 Summer Olympics.
