= Elizabeth McCagg =

American rower (born 1967)

Personal information
- Born: April 29, 1967 (age 59) Kirkland, Washington, United States

Sport
- Sport: Rowing
Medal record
Women's rowing
Representing United States
World Rowing Championships
Gold medal – first place	1995 Tampere	W8+
Silver medal – second place	1993 Račice	W8+
Silver medal – second place	1994 Indianapolis	W8+
Silver medal – second place	1999 St. Catharines	W8+
Bronze medal – third place	1993 Račice	W2-
Pan American Games
Gold medal – first place	1995 Mar del Plata	W2-

Elizabeth "Betsy" McCagg (born April 29, 1967), known under her married name as Betsy Hills, is an American rower. She finished 4th in the women's eight at the 1996 Summer Olympics. She rowed with her twin sister Mary. She graduated from Harvard University. The rower Liz Hills is her sister-in-law.
