= Gymnastics at the 1996 Summer Olympics – Men's vault =

Olympic gymnastics event

Men's vault at the Games of the XXVI Olympiad
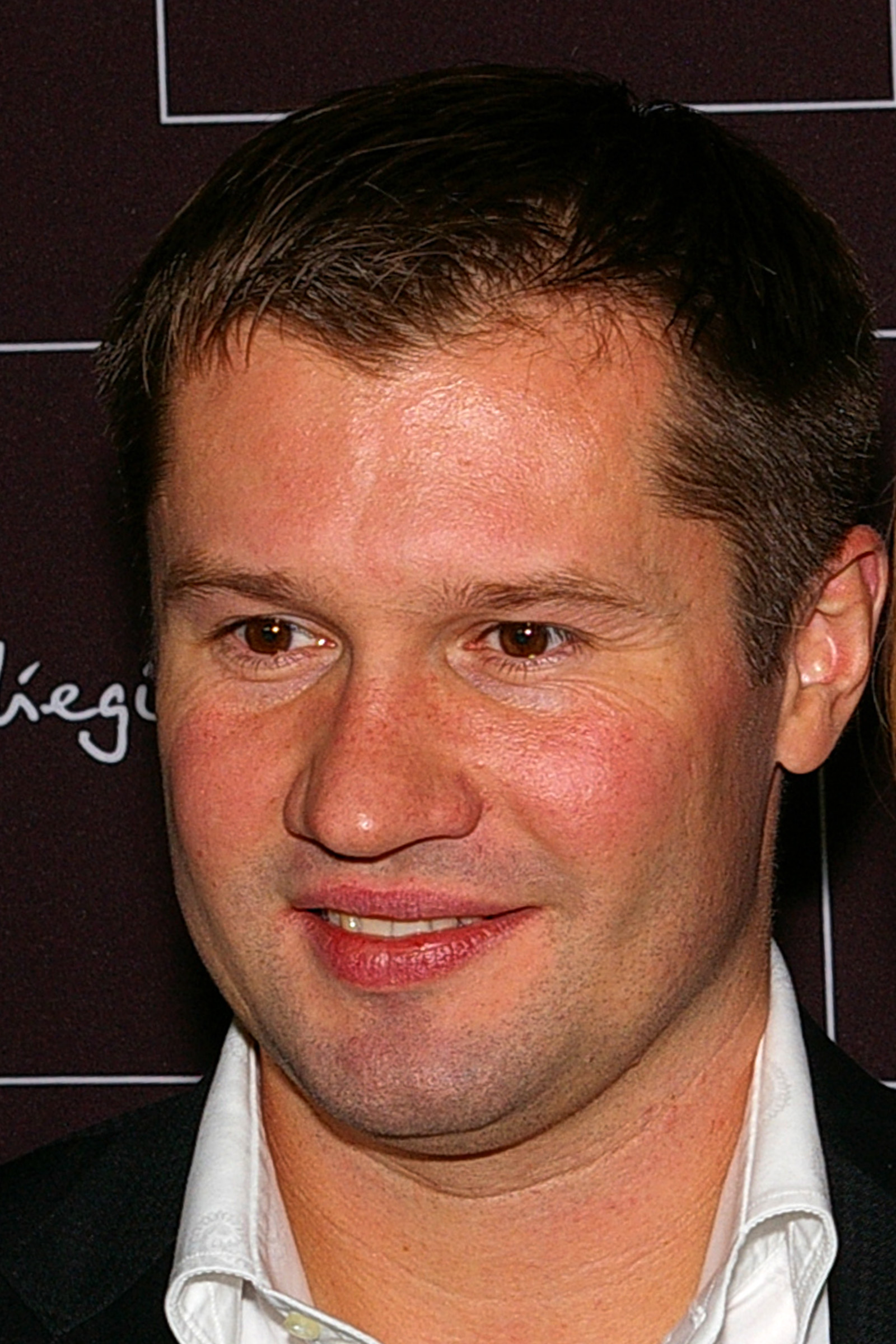
- Alexei Nemov
- Venue: Georgia Dome
- Dates: 20–29 July 1996
- Competitors: 105 from 31 nations
- Winning score: 9.787

Medalists
1st place, gold medalist(s)		Alexei Nemov; Russia
2nd place, silver medalist(s)		Yeo Hong-Chul; South Korea
3rd place, bronze medalist(s)		Vitaly Scherbo; Belarus

The men's vault competition was one of eight events for male competitors in artistic gymnastics at the 1996 Summer Olympics in Atlanta. The qualification and final rounds took place on July 20, 22 and 29th at the Georgia Dome. There were 105 competitors from 31 nations, with nations in the team event having up to 7 gymnasts (under the "7-6-5" system unique to 1996, teams had 7 gymnasts, designated 6 for each apparatus with 5 to count; however, all 7 could compete on each apparatus for individual purposes) and other nations having up to 3 gymnasts. The event was won by Alexei Nemov of Russia, the nation's first victory in the men's vault after the dissolution of the Soviet Union. Yeo Hong-Chul gave South Korea its third consecutive podium appearance in the event, this time with silver. Vitaly Scherbo of Belarus was the fifth man to win multiple medals in the vault, adding bronze to his 1992 gold.

== Background ==
This was the 19th appearance of the event, which is one of the five apparatus events held every time there were apparatus events at the Summer Olympics (no apparatus events were held in 1900, 1908, 1912, or 1920). Five of the eight finalists from 1992 returned: gold medalist Vitaly Scherbo of the Unified Team (now for Belarus), silver medalist Hrihoriy Misyutin of the Unified Team (now for Ukraine), fourth-place finisher Li Xiaoshuang of China, and fifth-place finisher Zoltán Supola and seventh-place finisher Szilveszter Csollány of Hungary. Alexei Nemov was the two-time defending world champion, with Misyutin sharing the 1995 world title with him. Scherbo had won in 1994, taking bronze in 1995, and finished fourth in 1996.

Armenia, Barbados, Belarus, Croatia, the Czech Republic, Georgia, Greece, Iceland, Ireland, Kazakhstan, Russia, and Ukraine each made their debut in the men's vault. The United States made its 17th appearance, most of any nation; the Americans had missed only the inaugural 1896 vault and the boycotted 1980 Games.

== Competition format ==
The event used a "vaulting horse" aligned parallel to the gymnast's run (rather than the modern "vaulting table" in use since 2004). The 1996 gymnastics competition introduced the "7–6–5" format, in which each team had 7 members, designated 6 for each apparatus, and had 5 count for team scores. However, all 7 could compete on each apparatus for individual competition purposes. Other nations could enter up to 3 individual gymnasts. All entrants in the gymnastics competitions performed both a compulsory exercise and a voluntary exercise for each apparatus (except for any apparatus in which a team member was not competing). The scores for all 12 exercises were summed to give an individual all-around qualifying score for those gymnasts competing on every apparatus. These exercise scores were also used for qualification for the apparatus finals. The two exercises (compulsory and voluntary) for each apparatus were summed to give an apparatus score. The top eight gymnasts, with a limit of two per nation, advanced to the final. Non-finalists were ranked 9th through 105th based on preliminary score. The preliminary score had no effect on the final; once the eight finalists were selected, their ranking depended only on the final exercise. For the vault, the final consisted of two attempts per gymnast, with the average score of the two counting.

== Schedule ==
All times are Eastern Daylight Time (UTC-4)

Date	Time	Round
Saturday, 20 July 1996		Preliminary: Compulsory
Monday, 22 July 1996		Preliminary: Voluntary
Monday, 29 July 1996	20:43	Final

== Results ==
=== Qualifying ===
There were 105 gymnasts that competed in the vault event during the compulsory and optional rounds on July 20 and 22. The eight highest scoring gymnasts advanced to the final on July 29. Each country was limited to two competitors in the final.

=== Final ===
The average score of the two vaults was the final score.

Rank	Gymnast	Nation	Vault 1	Vault 2	Score
1st place, gold medalist(s)	Alexei Nemov	Russia	9.762	9.812	9.787
2nd place, silver medalist(s)	Yeo Hong-Chul	South Korea	9.837	9.657	9.756
3rd place, bronze medalist(s)	Vitaly Scherbo	Belarus	9.712	9.737	9.724
4	Ivan Ivanov	Bulgaria	9.687	9.600	9.643
4	Li Xiaoshuang	China	9.500	9.787	9.643
6	Alexei Voropaev	Russia	9.637	9.600	9.618
7	Igor Korobchinski	Ukraine	9.637	9.500	9.568
8	Ivan Pavlovski	Belarus	9.612	9.375	9.493
