= Ioana Olteanu =

Romanian rower

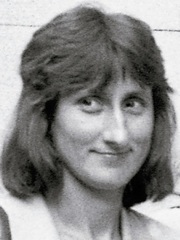

Personal information
- Born: 25 February 1966 (age 60) Drăcșenei, Romania
- Height: 178 cm (5 ft 10 in)
- Weight: 74 kg (163 lb)

Sport
- Sport: Rowing
- Club: Steaua Bucharest
Medal record
Representing Romania
Olympic Games
| Gold medal – first place | 1996 Atlanta | Eight |
| Gold medal – first place | 2000 Sydney | Eight |
| Silver medal – second place | 1992 Barcelona | Eight |
World Rowing Championships
| Gold medal – first place | 1993 Račice | Eights |
| Gold medal – first place | 1997 Aiguebelette | Eights |
| Gold medal – first place | 1998 Cologne | Eights |
| Gold medal – first place | 1999 St. Catharines | Eights |
| Silver medal – second place | 1995 Tampere | Eights |
| Silver medal – second place | 1997 Aiguebelette | Coxless fours |
| Bronze medal – third place | 1994 Indianapolis | Eights |
| Bronze medal – third place | 1998 Cologne | Double sculls |
Summer Universiade
| Gold medal – first place | 1993 Buffalo | Quadruple sculls |
| Silver medal – second place | 1993 Buffalo | Coxless fours |

Ioana Olteanu (later Călin, born 25 February 1966) is a retired Romanian rower. Competing in eights she won two gold and one silver medals at the 1992–2000 Olympics and four world titles in 1993 and 1997–1999.

Olteanu retired after the 2000 Olympics and gave birth to a child in August 2004, aged 38.
