= Heather McDermid =

Canadian rower (born 1968)

Medal record

Women's rowing

Representing Canada

Olympic Games
Silver medal – second place	1996 Atlanta	Eight
Bronze medal – third place	2000 Sydney	Eight

World Rowing Championships
Bronze medal – third place	1999 St. Catharines	Eight

Heather McDermid (born 17 October 1968 in Calgary) is a Canadian rower and former middle-distance runner.

Before her rowing career, McDermid was an accomplished 800 metres runner for the Rice Owls track and field team. She led off their All-American 4 × 800 metres relay team at the 1989 NCAA Division I Indoor Track and Field Championships.
