= Kate Pollitt =

British rower

Personal information
- Nationality: British
- Born: 24 August 1967 (age 57); Norwich, England

Sport
- Sport: Rowing

Kate Pollitt (born 24 August 1967) is a British rower. She competed in the women's eight event at the 1996 Summer Olympics.
