= Suzie Longstaff =

British rower

Personal information
- Nationality: British
- Born: 14 June 1969 (age 57) Leamington Spa, England

Sport
- Sport: Rowing
Medal record
Women's rowing
Representing Great Britain
World Championships
Bronze medal – third place	1997 Aiguebelette-le-Lac	W8+

Suzanne Kathryn Longstaff (née Ellis, born 14 June 1969) is a British teacher and former rower.

== Biography ==
Longstaff attended Abbots Bromley School and then Durham University, graduating in 1990 with a degree in Economics. She coxed for Durham University Women's Boat Club as a student. From 1991-1994 she was employed as an Advertising Manager at Haymarket Publishing.

She competed in the women's eight event at the 1996 Summer Olympics. In 1996 she began teacher training at Homerton College, Cambridge, and was selected to cox the Cambridge University Boat Club's reserve crew Goldie at the 1997 Boat Race. The same year she was the cox for the British crew that won the bronze medal in the women's eight at the 1997 World Championships. She was selected to cox the university's reserve crew for a second time in 1998.

Longstaff was the Headmistress of Putney High School from 2015 to 2023.
