= Tosha Tsang =

Canadian rower

Personal information
- National team: Canada
- Born: October 17, 1970 (age 55) Saskatoon, Saskatchewan, Canada

Sport
- Sport: Rowing
- Event: Women's Eight (W8+)
- University team: McGill University Rowing Club
- Club: Montreal Rowing Club
- Coached by: Al Morrow
Medal record
Women's rowing
Representing Canada
Olympic Games
Silver medal – second place	1996 Atlanta	Eight

Tosha Tsang (born October 17, 1970) is a Canadian rower. Tsang joined the Canadian national team in 1993. She competed at the 1995 World Championships, finishing sixth in the eights, and won a silver medal in the eights at the 1996 Summer Olympics.

After retiring from rowing competition, Tsang enrolled in the sociology doctoral program at the University of Alberta and obtained a Master of Library and Information Studies at the University of British Columbia's School of Library, Archival and Information Studies.
