= Doina Spîrcu =

Romanian rower

Medal record

Women's rowing

Representing Romania

Olympic Games
Gold medal – first place	1996 Atlanta	W8+

World Rowing Championships
Gold medal – first place	1999 St. Catharines	W8+
Silver medal – second place	1995 Tampere	W8+
Silver medal – second place	1997 Aiguebelette	W4-
Silver medal – second place	2000 Zagreb	W4-
Silver medal – second place	2001 Lucerne	W8+

Doina Spîrcu (née Craciun, born 24 July 1970 in Slobozia) is a Romanian rower. She competed at the 1996 Olympics under her married name.
