= Annamarie Phelps =

British rower

Annamarie Phelps CBE
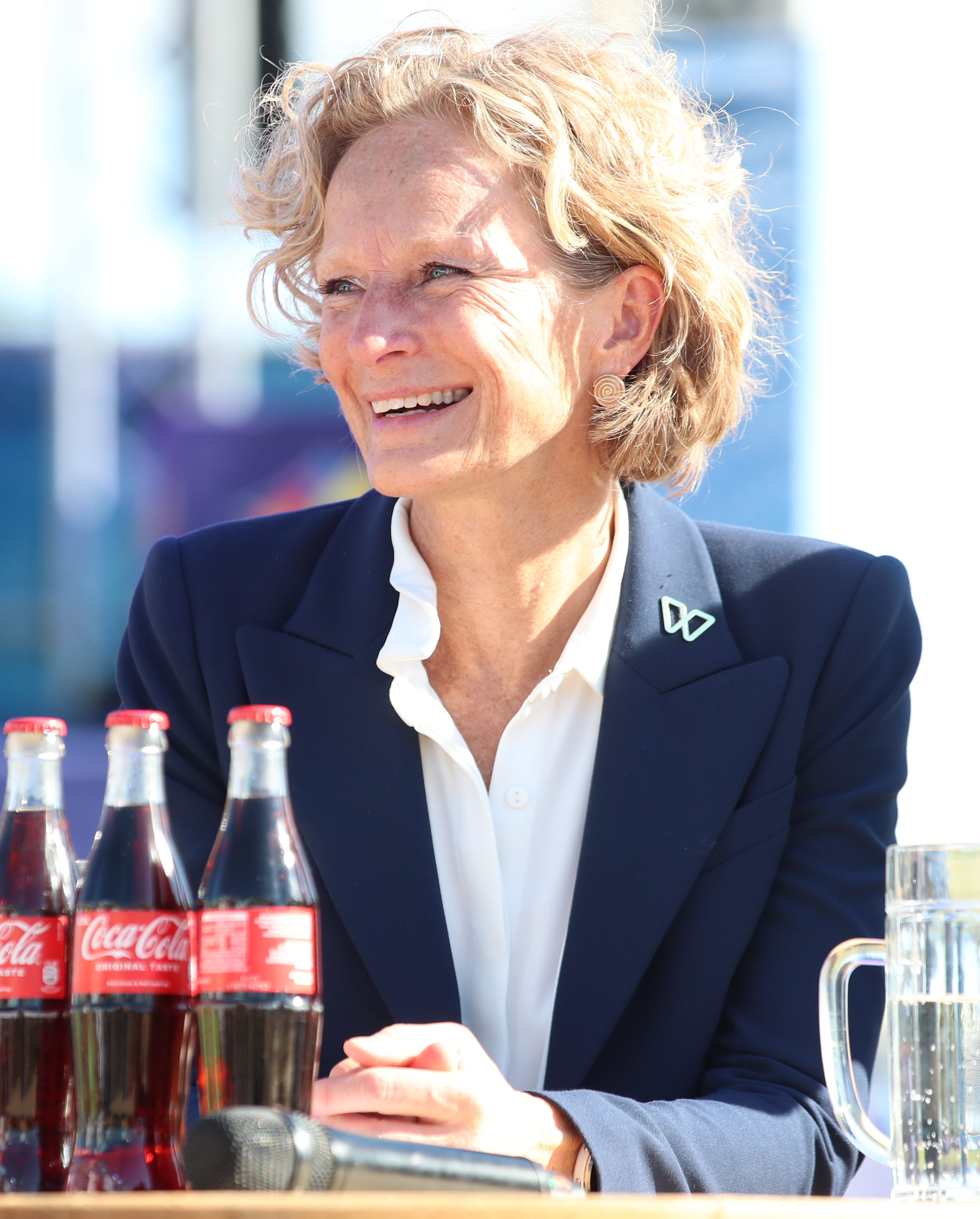

Personal information
- Nationality: British
- Born: Annamarie Stapleton; 24 May 1966 (age 59) Brent, England, United Kingdom

Sport
- Sport: Rowing

Annamarie Phelps CBE (née Stapleton, born 24 May 1966), is a British rower and sports administrator. She competed in the women's eight event at the 1996 Summer Olympics. She was Chairman of British Rowing from 2013 to 2018, and became Vice-Chairman of the British Olympic Association in 2017. She was chair of the British Horseracing Authority from June 2019 to June 2022.

Phelps was appointed Commander of the Order of the British Empire (CBE) in the 2016 New Year Honours, for services to rowing.
