= Tamara Davydenko =

Belarusian rower (born 1975)

Medal record

Women's rowing

Representing Belarus

Olympic Games
Bronze medal – third place	1996 Atlanta	Eight

World Rowing Championships
Bronze medal – third place	1995 Tampere	W4-

Tamara Viktorovna Davydenko (Belarusian: Тамара Давыдзенка; born 8 June 1975) is a Belarus rower. She won a bronze medal at the 1996 Summer Olympics and another bronze at the 1995 World Rowing Championships.
