= Theresa Luke =

Canadian rower (born 1967)

Personal information
- Born: February 20, 1967 (age 59) Vancouver, British Columbia, Canada
Medal record
Women's rowing
Representing Canada
Olympic Games
Silver medal – second place	1996 Atlanta	Eight
Bronze medal – third place	2000 Sydney	Eight
World Championships
Bronze medal – third place	1999 St. Catharines	W8+
Pan American Games
Gold medal – first place	1999 Winnipeg	Coxless pair
Summer Universiade
Gold medal – first place	1993 Buffalo	Eight

Theresa Anne Luke (born February 20, 1967) is a retired Canadian rower. She rowed in the Women's eights in the 1996 and 2000 Summer Olympics. She won silver and bronze, respectively. After she retired, she became a teacher in Victoria, BC.
