= Lisa Eyre =

British rower

Personal information
- Nationality: British
- Born: 18 December 1968 (age 56) Nantwich, England

Sport
- Sport: Rowing

Lisa Eyre (born 18 December 1968) is a British former rower. She competed at the 1996 Summer Olympics and the 2000 Summer Olympics.
