= Nataliya Lavrinenko =

Belarusian rower (born 1977)

Medal record

Women's rowing

Representing Belarus

Olympic Games
Bronze medal – third place	1996 Atlanta	Eight

Nataliya Petrovna Lavrinenko (Belarusian: Наталля Пятроўна Лаўрыненка; born 30 March 1977, in Krychaw) is a Belarus rower. She competed in rowing at the 1996 Summer Olympics, winning a bronze medal.
