= Alison Korn =

Canadian rower and Olympian

Medal record

Women's rowing

Representing Canada

Olympic Games
Silver medal – second place	1996 Atlanta	Eight
Bronze medal – third place	2000 Sydney	Eight

World Rowing Championships
Gold medal – first place	1997 Aiguebelette	W2-
Gold medal – first place	1998 Cologne	W2-
Silver medal – second place	1997 Aiguebelette	W8+
Bronze medal – third place	1998 Cologne	W8+
Bronze medal – third place	1999 St. Catharines	W8+

Alison Korn (born 22 November 1970 in Ottawa, Ontario) was a Canadian rower and Olympian.

== Early life ==
Korn was raised in Nepean, Ontario. She attended Bells Corners Public School, D.A. Moodie Intermediate School and Bell High School

Korn was a member of Girl Guides of Canada as a child and attended Girl Guides Ontario's Camp Woolsey.

== Career ==
Korn started rowing when she was 21. As a member of the Canadian national rowing team, she won silver and bronze medals at the 1996 and 2000 summer Olympics, respectively. She also has five world championship medals, including back-to-back golds in 1997 and 1998. Korn retired from the sport in 2000.

Korn has continued her involvement in Girl Guides of Canada as an adult volunteer.

=== Polar Trek ===
Korn was a member of an all-women's ski trek to the North Pole in 2001, which she chronicled for the Ottawa Citizen.

== Education ==
Korn studied political science at McGill University, and earned her Masters in Journalism from Carleton University.

== Honours ==
In 2016 Korn had a street named after her in Nepean, Ontario. She was inducted into the Ottawa Sport Hall of Fame in 2002.
