= Yelena Mikulich =

Belarusian rower (born 1977)

Medal record

Women's rowing

Representing Belarus

Olympic Games
Bronze medal – third place	1996 Atlanta	Eight

World Rowing Championships
Gold medal – first place	1999 St. Catharines	Coxless four

Yelena Vladimirovna Mikulich (Belarusian: Елена Владимировна Микулич; born 21 February 1977 in Minsk) is a Belarus former rower, who won a bronze medal at the 1996 Summer Olympics.
