= Alison Gill =

British rower

Personal information
- Born: 23 August 1966 (age 60) Bristol, Great Britain

Sport
- Sport: Rowing
Medal record
Representing Great Britain
Summer Universiade
| Bronze medal – third place | 1989 Duisburg | Single sculls |

Alison Jane Gill (née Hall, born 23 August 1966) is a British rower. Along with Annabel Eyres she finished 5th in the women's double sculls at the 1992 Summer Olympics. Gill studied at St Hilda's College, Oxford.
