= Nataliya Stasyuk =

Belarusian rower (born 1969)

Medal record

Women's rowing

Olympic Games

Representing Belarus
Bronze medal – third place	1996 Atlanta	Eight

World Rowing Championships

Representing the Soviet Union
Silver medal – second place	1991 Vienna	Eight

Representing Belarus
Bronze medal – third place	1995 Tampere	Coxless four

Nataliya Viktorovna Stasyuk (Belarusian: Наталья Викторовна Стасюк; born 21 January 1969 in Vostochnoy) is a retired Belarusian rower who won a bronze medal at the 1996 Summer Olympics, as well as a silver and a bronze medal at the world championships in 1991 and 1995, respectively. On 16 July 2000 she was banned for life from competitions for a positive doping test.
