= Aleksandra Pankina =

Belarusian rower (born 1972)

Personal information
- Born: 2 January 1972 (age 54) Bykhaw, Byelorussian SSR, USSR
- Spouse: Igor Zuborenko

Sport
- Sport: Rowing
Medal record
Women's rowing
Representing Belarus
Olympic Games
Bronze medal – third place	1996 Atlanta	Eight

Aleksandra Yuryevna Pankina (Belarusian: Александра Юрьевна Панкина; born 2 January 1972) is a Belarusian rower, who is perhaps best known for winning a bronze medal at the 1996 Summer Olympics.

== Personal life ==
Pankina was born on 2 January 1972 in Bykhov, then part of the Byelorussian SSR. She was born the youngest child of a naval military family with two older sisters. As a child, she was unathletic, but her father forced her to participate in sports and so she did high jump at a boarding school called School No. 21 and later also shot put. She was injured in Saint Petersburg when she twisted her knee during a jump on a trampoline, forcing her to retire from both sports before the deputy director for sports at the boarding school suggested she do rowing.

She is currently married to Igor Zuborenko, a rower who competed at the 1988 Summer Olympics.

== Career ==
In 1995, she competed at the 1995 World Rowing Championships in Tampere as part of eights, where they placed 5th. In 1996, the Belarusian team for eights, which included Pankina, placed third at the 1996 Summer Olympics. Two years later at the 1997 World Rowing Championships in Lac d'Aiguebelette she was part of the double fours and also took 5th place. In 1997, she was awarded the honorary title of "Honored Master of Sports of the Republic of Belarus" for achieving high sporting results. In June 1998, she placed third in coxed four at the Rowing World Cup.

After retiring from rowing, she worked as a coach in rowing at "Spartak" at their Youth Sports School. Starting in 2005, she worked as a chief specialist of the Department of Physical Culture, Sports and Tourism of the Mogilev City Executive Committee.
