= Valentina Skrabatun =

Belarusian rower (born 1958)

Medal record

Women's rowing

Representing Belarus

Olympic Games
Bronze medal – third place	1996 Atlanta	Eight

Valentina Aleksandrovna Skrabatun (Belarusian: Валентина Александровна Скрабатун; born 23 July 1958 in Dushevo) is a Belarusian rower, who won a bronze medal at the 1996 Summer Olympics, held in Atlanta, United States.
