= Marina Znak =

Belarusian rower (born 1961)

Personal information
- Born: 17 May 1961 (age 65) East Berlin, East Germany

Sport
- Sport: Rowing
- Club: Dynamo Minsk
Medal record
Women's rowing
Representing the Soviet Union
World Rowing Championships
Gold medal – first place	1985 Hazewinkel	Eight
Gold medal – first place	1986 Nottingham	Eight
Silver medal – second place	1991 Vienna	Eight
Representing Belarus
Olympic Games
Bronze medal – third place	1996 Atlanta	Eight
World Rowing Championships
Gold medal – first place	1999 St. Catharines	Coxless four
Gold medal – first place	2000 Zagreb	Coxless four
Bronze medal – third place	1995 Tampere	Coxless four

Marina Nikolayevna Znak-Sinelshchikova (Belarusian: Марина Николаевна Знак-Синельщикова; born 17 May 1961 in East Berlin, East Germany) is a Belarusian rower, who won a bronze medal at the 1996 Summer Olympics while representing Belarus. Before 1991, she competed internationally for the Soviet Union, winning two golds and a silver medal for the Soviets at the World Rowing Championships from 1985 to 1991. While appearing at the World Rowing Championships for Belarus from 1995 to 1999, she won a further two gold medals and a bronze.
