= Anna van der Kamp =

Canadian rower

Personal information
- Born: 19 June 1972 (age 54) Abbotsford, British Columbia, Canada
Medal record
Women's rowing
Representing Canada
Olympic Games
Silver medal – second place	1996 Atlanta	Eight

Anna van der Kamp (born June 19, 1972 in Abbotsford, British Columbia) is a former rower from Canada, who won the silver medal in the women's eights at the 1996 Summer Olympics in Atlanta, Georgia. She formerly worked at the Delphi Group, but currently works for the Natural Resources Canada, and is the member of Clean Air Champions, a non-profit organization dedicated to involving top athletes in raising awareness of air quality issues and pursuing initiatives to combat the problem.
