= Yaroslava Pavlovich =

Belarusian rowing cox

Medal record

Women's rowing

Representing Belarus

Olympic Games
Bronze medal – third place	1996 Atlanta	Eight

Yaroslava Anatolyevna Pavlovich (Belarusian: Яраслава Анатолеўна Паўловіч, romanized: Yaraslava Anatoljeŭna Paŭlovič); born 2 November 1969, in Pinsk) is a Belarusian rowing cox, who won a bronze at the 1996 Summer Olympics.
