= Nataliya Volchek =

Belarusian rower (born 1972)

Medal record

Women's rowing

Representing Belarus

Olympic Games
Bronze medal – third place	1996 Atlanta	Eight

Nataliya Mechislavovna Volchek (Belarusian: Наталья Мечиславовна Волчек; born 6 January 1972, in Minsk) is a Belarusian rower, who won a bronze medal at the 1996 Summer Olympics.
