= Netherlands at the 1996 Summer Olympics =

- Flag of the Netherlands
- IOC code: NED
- NOC: Dutch Olympic Committee*; Dutch Sports Federation
- Website: www.nocnsf.nl (in Dutch)

in Atlanta
- Competitors: 235
- Flag bearer: Nico Rienks (rowing)
- Medals Ranked 15th: Gold 4 Silver 5 Bronze 10 Total 19

Summer Olympics appearances (overview)
- 1900; 1904; 1908; 1912; 1920; 1924; 1928; 1932; 1936; 1948; 1952; 1956; 1960; 1964; 1968; 1972; 1976; 1980; 1984; 1988; 1992; 1996; 2000; 2004; 2008; 2012; 2016; 2020; 2024

Other related appearances
- 1906 Intercalated Games

The Netherlands competed at the 1996 Summer Olympics in Atlanta, United States.

== Medalists ==
Medal	Name	Sport	Event	Date
Gold	Bart Brentjes	Cycling	Men's cross-country	July 30
Gold	Netherlands men's national volleyball team: Peter Blangé; Bas van de Goor; Mike van de Goor; Rob Grabert; Henk-Jan Held; Guido Görtzen; Misha Latuhihin; Olof van der Meulen; Jan Posthuma; Brecht Rodenburg; Richard Schuil; Ron Zwerver	Volleyball	Men's tournament	August 4
Gold	Netherlands men's national field hockey team: Jacques Brinkman; Floris Jan Bovelander; Maurits Crucq; Marc Delissen (captain); Jeroen Delmee; Taco van den Honert; Erik Jazet; Ronald Jansen; Leo Klein Gebbink; Bram Lomans; Teun de Nooijer; Wouter van Pelt; Stephan Veen; Guus Vogels; Tycho van Meer; Remco van Wijk	Field hockey	Men's tournament	August 2
Gold	Michiel Bartman; Jeroen Duyster; Ronald Florijn; Koos Maasdijk; Nico Rienks; Diederik Simon; Niels van Steenis; Niels van der Zwan; Henk-Jan Zwolle	Rowing	Men's eight	July 27
Silver	Ingrid Haringa	Cycling	Women's points race	July 28
Silver	Margriet Matthijsse	Sailing	Women's Europe	August 2
Silver	Anky van Grunsven	Equestrian	Individual dressage	August 3
Silver	Tineke Bartels, Anky van Grunsven, Gonnelien Rothenberger and Sven Rothenberger	Equestrian	Team dressage	July 27
Silver	Maarten van der Linden and Pepijn Aardewijn	Rowing	Men's lightweight double sculls	July 28
Bronze	Kirsten Vlieghuis	Swimming	Women's 400 m freestyle	July 22
Bronze	Kirsten Vlieghuis	Swimming	Women's 800 m freestyle	July 25
Bronze	Ingrid Haringa	Cycling	Women's sprint	July 27
Bronze	Roy Heiner	Sailing	Men's Finn	August 2
Bronze	Sven Rothenberger	Equestrian	Individual dressage	August 3
Bronze	Mark Huizinga	Judo	Men's middleweight (-86 kg)	July 22
Bronze	Jenny Gal	Judo	Women's half middleweight (-61 kg)	July 23
Bronze	Claudia Zwiers	Judo	Women's middleweight (-66 kg)	July 22
Bronze	Irene Eijs and Eeke van Nes	Rowing	Women's double sculls	July 27
Bronze	Netherlands women's national field hockey team: Suzanne Plesman; Dillianne van den Boogaard; Florentine Steenberghe; Willemijn Duyster; Mijntje Donners; Fleur van de Kieft; Nicole Koolen; Jeannette Lewin; Wietske de Ruiter; Ellen Kuipers; Margje Teeuwen; Carole Thate; Jacqueline Toxopeus; Stella de Heij; Noor Holsboer; Suzan van der Wielen	Field hockey	Women's tournament	August 2

== Archery ==
The Dutch archery team included former Soviet Union archer Lyudmila Arzhannikova. She placed 15th for the Netherlands in Atlanta.

Athlete	Event	Ranking round		Round of 64	Round of 32	Round of 16	Quarterfinals	Semifinals	Finals / BM	
Athlete	Event	Score	Seed	Opposition Score	Opposition Score	Opposition Score	Opposition Score	Opposition Score	Opposition Score	Rank
Lyudmila Arzhannikova	Women's individual	652	11	Bilukha (UKR) (54); W 149–141	Sjovall (SWE) (22); W 160–151	Altinkaynak (TUR) (6); L 150–160	did not advance			15
Christel Verstegen	Women's individual	639	27	Eksi (TUR) (38); W 155–150	Altinkaynak (TUR) (6); L 160–149	did not Advance				27

== Athletics ==
Key

- Note–Ranks given for track events are within the athlete's heat only
- Q = Qualified for the next round
- q = Qualified for the next round as a fastest loser or, in field events, by position without achieving the qualifying target
- NR = National record
- NM = No mark
- N/A = Round not applicable for the event
- Bye = Athlete not required to compete in round

Men
Track & road events

Athlete	Event	Heat		Quarterfinal		Semifinal		Final	
Athlete	Event	Result	Rank	Result	Rank	Result	Rank	Result	Rank
Marko Koers	1500 m	3:36.18	2 Q	—N/a		3:36.06	5 Q	3:38.18	7
Bert van Vlaanderen	Marathon	—N/a						2:20.48	45

Field events

Athlete	Event	Qualification		Final	
Athlete	Event	Distance	Position	Distance	Position
Laurens Looije	Pole vault	5.40	23	did not advance	

Combined events – Decathlon

Athlete	Event	100 m	LJ	SP	HJ	400 m	110H	DT	PV	JT	1500 m	Final	Rank
Marcel Dost	Result	10.87	7.21	13.91	1.95	48.19	14.52	41.92	5.20	57.76	4:38.81	8111	18
Marcel Dost	Points	890	864	723	758	900	908	704	972	704	688	8111	18
Jack Rosendaal	Result	11.24	7.33	13.59	2.07	50.93	14.46	41.24	4.70	63.80	4:25.98	8035	21
Jack Rosendaal	Points	808	893	703	868	772	916	690	819	795	771	8035	21

Women
Track & road events

Athlete	Event	Heat		Quarterfinal		Semifinal		Final	
Athlete	Event	Result	Rank	Result	Rank	Result	Rank	Result	Rank
Stella Jongmans	800 m	2:00.26	2 Q	—N/a		DNF		did not advance	
Anne van Schuppen	Marathon	—N/a						2:40.46	41

Field events

Athlete	Event	Qualification		Final	
Athlete	Event	Distance	Position	Distance	Position
Sharon Jaklofsky	Long Jump	6.75	3 Q	NM	
Jacqueline Goormachtigh	Discus throw	58.74	21	did not advance	
Corrie de Bruin	Discus throw	55.48	36	did not advance	
Corrie de Bruin	Shot put	did not start			

== Badminton ==
Athlete	Event	Round of 64	Round of 32	Round of 16	Quarterfinal	Semifinal	Final / BM	
Athlete	Event	Opposition Score	Opposition Score	Opposition Score	Opposition Score	Opposition Score	Opposition Score	Rank
Joris van Soerland	Men's singles	Bye	Dong (CHN); L (9–15, 4–15)	Did not advance				
Jeroen van Dijk	Men's singles	Uvarov (RUS); W (15–8, 15–10)	Hock (MAS); L (11–15, 10–15)	Did not advance				
Ron Michels	Men's singles	Hall (GBR); L (4–15, 4–15)	Did not advance					
Eline Coene; Erica van den Heuvel	Women's doubles	—N/a	Morgan / Muggeridge (GBR); W (15–10, 15–5)	Chen / Peng (CHN); L (3–15, 8–15)	Did not advance			
Eline Coene; Ron Michels	Mixed doubles	—N/a	Velkov / Nedjalkova (BUL); W (15–4, 15–6)	Sogaard / Olsen (DEN); L (4–15, 6–15)	Did not advance			

== Baseball ==
The Netherlands made its first Olympic baseball appearance in 1996. They defeated Australia and Italy but lost their other five games in the preliminary round. When this result put the Dutch team in a three-way tie for fifth through seventh place with Australia and Italy, the head-to-head victories gave the Netherlands fifth place.

Team roster

- Johnny Balentina
- Giel ten Bosch
- Eric de Bruin
- Peter Callenbach
- Rob Cordemans
- Jeffrey Cranston
- Eddie Dix
- Marlon Fluonia
- Evert-Jan 't Hoen
- Eelco Jansen

- Marcel Joost
- Adonis Kemp
- Geoffrey Kohl
- Marcel Kruijt
- André Maris
- Edsel Martis
- Paul Nanne
- Tom Nanne
- Byron Ward
- Danny Wout

Results

Team	W	L	Tiebreaker
Cuba	7	0	–
United States	6	1	–
Japan	4	3	1–0
Nicaragua	4	3	0–1
Netherlands	2	5	2–0
Italy	2	5	1–1
Australia	2	5	0–2
South Korea	1	6	–

== Canoeing ==
=== Slalom ===
Men

Athlete	Event	Run 1		Run 2		Best	
Athlete	Event	Time	Rank	Time	Rank	Time	Rank
Michael Reys	K-1	146.79	7	210.49	38	146.79	11
Frits Sins	K-1	209.42	35	169.33	27	169.33	37

== Cycling ==
=== Road competition ===
Men

Athlete	Event	Time	Rank
Erik Dekker	Road Race	04:53:58	38
Erik Dekker	Time Trial	1:07:08	11
Erik Breukink	Road Race	04:53:58	45
Erik Breukink	Time Trial	1:08:33	17
Tristan Hoffman	Road Race	04:53:58	108
Aart Vierhouten	Road Race	04:53:58	56
Danny Nelissen	Road Race	04:54:00	111

Women

Athlete	Event	Time	Rank
Yvonne Brunen	Road Race	02:37:06	26
Yvonne Brunen	Time Trial	40:39	19
Elsbeth Vink	Road Race	02:37:06	28
Ingrid Haringa	Road Race	did not Finish	

=== Track competition ===
Points race

Athlete	Event	Points	Rank
Peter Pieters	Men's points race	0	21
Ingrid Haringa	Women's points race	23	2nd place, silver medalist(s)

Sprint

Athlete	Event	Qualification		First round	Repechage 1	Second round	Repechage 2	Round of 16	Repechage 3	Quarterfinal	Semifinal	Final / BM	
Athlete	Event	Time Speed	Rank	Opposition Time	Opposition Time	Opposition Time	Opposition Time	Opposition Time	Opposition Time	Opposition Time	Opposition Time	Opposition Time	Rank
Ingrid Haringa	Women's sprint	11.456; 62.84 km/h	4 Q	—N/a				Salumäe (EST); W 12.164	Bye	Dubnicoff (CAN); W	Ferris (AUS); L	Neuman (GER); W	3rd place, bronze medalist(s)

Pursuit

Athlete	Event	Qualifying		Quarterfinal	Semifinal	Final	
Athlete	Event	Time	Rank	Opposition Time	Opposition Time	Opposition Time	Rank
Peter Pieters	Men's individual pursuit	OVT		Did not advance			
Jarich Bakker; Robert Slippens; Richard Rozendaal; Peter Schep	Men's team pursuit	4:16.175	12	Did not advance			

Time trial

Athlete	Event	Time	Rank
Dirk Jan van Hameren	Men's 1000m time trial	1:05.886	12

=== Mountain bike ===
Athlete	Event	Time	Rank
Bart Brentjens	Men's cross-country	2:17.38	1st place, gold medalist(s)
Marcel Arntz	Men's cross-country	did not finish	
Elsbeth Vink	Women's cross-country	1:54.38	5

== Equestrian ==
=== Dressage ===
Athlete	Horse	Event	Grand Prix		Grand Prix Special		Grand Prix Freestyle		Overall	
Athlete	Horse	Event	Score	Rank	Score	Rank	Score	Rank	Score	Rank
Tineke Bartles-de Vries	Olympic Barbria	Individual	67.70	14 Q	68.28	14 Q	69.66	13	205.54	13
Sven Rothenberger	Weyden	Individual	74.16	4 Q	74.00	4 Q	76.78	4	224.94	3rd place, bronze medalist(s)
Anky van Grunsven	Bonfire	Individual	75.72	2 Q	77.72	1 Q	79.58	2	233.02	2nd place, silver medalist(s)
Gonnelien Rothenberger	Olympic Dondolo	Individual	66.92	=15 Q	68.42	16	did not advance			
Tineke Bartles-de Vries; Sven Rothenberger; Anky van Grunsven; Gonnelien Rothenberger	See above	Team	—N/a						5437	2nd place, silver medalist(s)

=== Show jumping ===
Athlete	Horse	Event	Qualification								Final		
Athlete	Horse	Event	Round 1		Round 2			Round 3			Final		
Athlete	Horse	Event	Penalties	Rank	Penalties	Total	Rank	Penalties	Total	Rank	Penalties	Jump off	Rank
Jos Lansink	Carthago	Individual	4	=14	8	12	=22	8	20	=29	8.00	—N/a	=11
Emile Hendrix	Finesse	Individual	4	=14	12	16	=38	4	20	=29	Did not advance		
Bert Romp	Samantha	Individual	4	=14	8	12	=22	12	24	=40	Did not advance		
Jan Tops	Top Gun	Individual	0	=1	0	0	=1	4.25	4.25	4 Q	4.00	8.00	7
Jos Lansink; Emile Hendrix; Bert Romp; Jan Tops	See above	Team	—N/a								32.35	—N/a	7

== Judo ==
Men

Athlete	Event	Round of 64	Round of 32	Round of 16	Quarterfinal	Semifinal	Repechage 1	Repechage 2	Repechage 3	Final / BM	
Athlete	Event	Opposition Result	Opposition Result	Opposition Result	Opposition Result	Opposition Result	Opposition Result	Opposition Result	Opposition Result	Opposition Result	Rank
Patrick Klas	–78 kg	Bye	Figueroa (PUR); W	García (ARG); L	Did not advance						
Mark Huizinga	–86 kg	Bye	Jeon (KOR); L	did not advance			Biwole Abolo (CMR); W	Despaigne (CUB); W	Gill (CAN); W	Croitoru (ROU); W	3rd place, bronze medalist(s)
Ben Sonnemans	–95 kg	Bye	W	Stevens (GBR); W	Kim (KOR); L	Did not advance	Bye	Sergeyev (RUS); W	Nakamura (JPN); L	did not advance	
Denny Ebbers	+95 kg	Bye	Möller (GER); L	Did not advance							

Women

Athlete	Event	Round of 32	Round of 16	Quarterfinal	Semifinal	Repechage 1	Repechage 2	Repechage 3	Final / BM	
Athlete	Event	Opposition Result	Opposition Result	Opposition Result	Opposition Result	Opposition Result	Opposition Result	Opposition Result	Opposition Result	Rank
Tamara Meijer	-48 kg	Kuligina (KGZ); W	Kye (PRK); L	did not advance		bye	Nichilo (FRA); L	did not advance		
Jessica Gal	-56 kg	bye	González (CUB); L	did not advance		Baton (CUB); L	did not advance			
Jenny Gal	-61 kg	Buckingham (CAN); W	Beltrán (CUB); W	Álvarez (ESP); W	Emoto (JPN); L	bye			Kobas (TUR); W	3rd place, bronze medalist(s)
Claudia Zwiers	-66 kg	bye	Ogasawara (USA); W	Wu (TPE); W	Cho (KOR); L	bye			Revé (CUB); W	3rd place, bronze medalist(s)
Karin Kienhuis	-72 kg	bye	Howey (GBR); L	did not advance						
Angelique Seriese	+72 kg	Hagn (GER); L	did not advance							

== Rowing ==
Men

Athlete	Event	Heat		Repechage		Semifinal		Final	
Athlete	Event	Time	Rank	Time	Rank	Time	Rank	Time	Rank
Sjors van Iwaarden; Kai Compagner	Coxless pair	7:00.45	5 R	7:24.17	4 FC	—N/a		7:10.43	17
Maarten van der Linden; Pepijn Aardewijn	Lightweight double sculls	6:49.93	1 SA/B	Bye		6:27.07	2 FA	6:26.48	2nd place, silver medalist(s)
Sander van der Marck; Adri Middag; Joris Loefs; Pieter van Andel	Quadruple sculls	6:06.98	3 SA/B	Bye		6:03.72	4 FB	5:55.15	10
Henk-Jan Zwolle; Diederik Simon; Michiel Bartman; Michiel Bartman; Niels van der Zwan; Niels van Steenis; Ronald Florijn; Nico Rienks; Jeroen Duyster (cox)	Eight	5:41.41	1 FA	Bye		—N/a		5:42.74	1st place, gold medalist(s)

Women

Athlete	Event	Heat		Repechage		Semifinal		Final	
Athlete	Event	Time	Rank	Time	Rank	Time	Rank	Time	Rank
Elien Meijer; Anneke Venema	Coxless pair	7:43.58	3 SA/B	Bye		7:48.40	5 FB	7:17.26	7
Irene Eijs; Eeke van Nes	Double sculls	7:23.12	1 SA/B	Bye		7:16.39	2 FA	6:58.74	3rd place, bronze medalist(s)
Laurien Vermulst; Ellen Meliesie	Lightweight double sculls	7:32.30	3 R	7:00.17	1 SA/B	7:19.20	2 FA	7:21.92	6
Irene Eijs; Eeke van Nes; Meike van Driel; Nelleke Penninx	Quadruple sculls	6:43.76	2 R	6:15.92	2 FA	—N/a		6:35.54	6
Femke Boelen; Marleen van der Velden; Astrid van Koert; Marieke Westerhof; Rita de Jong; Tessa Knaven; Tessa Appeldoorn; Muriel van Schilfgaarde; Jissy de Wolf (cox)	Eight	6:32.71	3 R	6:08.85	3 FA	—N/a		6:31.11	6

== Sailing ==
Men

Athlete	Event	Race											Total	
Athlete	Event	1	2	3	4	5	6	7	8	9	10	11	Points	Rank
Martijn van Geemen	Mistral	15	17	12	23	12	~~23~~	~~PMS~~	20	19	—N/a		118	18
Roy Heiner	Finn	~~21~~	7	6	11	6	11	1	~~12~~	6	2	—N/a	50	3rd place, bronze medalist(s)
Ben Kouwenhoven; Jan Kouwenhoven	Finn	~~DNS~~	5	11	32	24	10	24	8	30	20	~~DQ~~	164	24

Women

Athlete	Event	Race											Total	
Athlete	Event	1	2	3	4	5	6	7	8	9	10	11	Points	Rank
Dorien de Vries	Mistral	~~13~~	5	~~DQ~~	10	8	8	3	12	6	—N/a		52	10
Margriet Matthijsse	Europe	~~PMS~~	2	1	10	2	1	1	4	~~12~~	5	4	37	2nd place, silver medalist(s)

Open

Fleet racing

Athlete	Event	Race											Total	
Athlete	Event	1	2	3	4	5	6	7	8	9	10	11	Points	Rank
Serge Kats	Laser	6	~~PMS~~	12	13	5	7	22	~~DSQ~~	19	11	3	98	13
Ron van Teylingen; Herbert Dercksen	Tornado	13	6	2	~~17~~	2	6	7	9	~~PMS~~	5	6	56	9

Mixed racing

Athlete	Event	Fleet racing												Match racing			
Athlete	Event	Race										Total		Quarterfinal	Semifinal	Final / BM	
Athlete	Event	1	2	3	4	5	6	7	8	9	10	Points	Rank	Opposition Result	Opposition Result	Opposition Result	Rank
Willem Potma; Frank Hettinga; Gerhard Potma	Soling	8	7	10	~~PMS~~	10	15	16	2	~~17~~	16	84	15	did not advance			

== Shooting ==
Athlete	Event	Qualification		Final	
Athlete	Event	Score	Rank	Score	Rank
Hennie Dompeling	Men's skeet	120	=15	did not advance	
Eric Swinkels	Men's skeet	117	=32	did not advance	

== Softball ==
Summary

Team	Event	Preliminary round								Semifinal	Final / BM	
Team	Event	Opposition Result	Opposition Result	Opposition Result	Opposition Result	Opposition Result	Opposition Result	Opposition Result	Rank	Opposition Result	Opposition Result	Rank
Netherlands women	Women's tournament	Japan; L 0–3	United States; L 0–9	Chinese Taipei; L 1–7	Australia; L 0–1	China; L 0–8	Canada; L 1–4	Puerto Rico; W 2–0	7	Did not advance		7

Team roster
- Madelon Beek
- Petra Beek
- Lucienne Geels
- Jacqueline de Heer
- Marjolein de Jong
- Jacqueline Knol
- Anita Kossen
- Anouk Mels
- Sandra Nieuwveen
- Penny le Noble
- Corrine Ockhuijsen
- Sonja Pannen
- Marlies van der Putten
- Gonny Reijnen
- Martine Stiemer

- Head coach: Ruud Elfers

== Swimming ==
Men

Athlete	Event	Heat		Final	
Athlete	Event	Time	Rank	Time	Rank
Pieter van den Hoogenband	50 m freestyle	22.82	13 FB	22.67	9
Pieter van den Hoogenband	100 m freestyle	49.73	7 FA	49.13	4
Pieter van den Hoogenband	200 m freestyle	1:48.68	4 FA	1:48.36	4
Benno Kuipers	100 m breaststroke	1:09.92	=18	Did not advance	
Stefan Aartsen	100 m butterfly	54.62	24	Did not advance	
Stefan Aartsen	200 m butterfly	2:00.04	12 FB	2:00.41	13
Martin van der Spoel	200 m individual medley	2.03.75	11 FB	2.03.01	10
Marcel Wouda	200 m individual medley	2:01.21	2 FA	2:01.45	4
Marcel Wouda	400 m individual medley	4:17.30	2 FA	4:17.71	5
Mark Veens; Pie Geelen; Martin van der Spoel; Pieter van den Hoogenband	4 × 100 m freestyle relay	3:20.16	3 Q	3:19.02	5
Marcel Wouda; Mark van der Zijden; Martin van der Spoel; Pieter van den Hoogenband; Tim Hoeijmans*	4 × 200 m freestyle relay	7:23.39	8 Q	7:21.96	7
Martin van der Spoel; Benno Kuipers; Stefan Aartsen; Pieter van den Hoogenband	4 × 100 m medley relay	3:42.42	10	Did not advance	

Key: * – Swimmer competed in the heat but not the final; FA – Qualify to A final (medal); FB – Qualify to B final (non-medal)

Women

Athlete	Event	Heat		Final	
Athlete	Event	Time	Rank	Time	Rank
Marianne Muis	50 m freestyle	25.93	11 FB	25.74	9
Angela Postma	50 m freestyle	26.00	13 FB	25.82	10
Karin Brienesse	100 m freestyle	55.81	5 FA	56.12	8
Carla Geurts	400 m freestyle	4:11.18	5 FA	4:10.06	6
Carla Geurts	800 m freestyle	8:39.85	7 FA	8:40.43	7
Kirsten Vlieghuis	400 m freestyle	4:11.04	3 FA	4:08.70	3rd place, bronze medalist(s)
Kirsten Vlieghuis	800 m freestyle	8:39.73	7 FA	8:30.84	3rd place, bronze medalist(s)
Madelon Baans	100 m breaststroke	1:11.17	21	Did not advance	
Minouche Smit	100 m individual medley	2:16.30	3 FA	2:16.73	7
Marianne Muis; Minouche Smit; Wilma van Hofwegen; Karin Brienesse	4 × 100 m freestyle relay	3:43.63	2 Q	3:42.40	4
Carla Geurts; Patricia Stokkers; Minouche Smit; Kirsten Vlieghuis	4 × 200 m freestyle relay	8:12.78	7 Q	8:08.48	6
Brenda Starink; Madelon Baans; Wilma van Hofwegen; Karin Brienesse	4 × 100 m medley relay	4:11.64	12	Did not advance	

Key: * – Swimmer competed in the heat but not the final; FA – Qualify to A final (medal); FB – Qualify to B final (non-medal)

== Table tennis ==
Athlete	Event	Group stage				Round of 16	Quarterfinal	Semifinal	Final / BM	
Athlete	Event	Opposition Result	Opposition Result	Opposition Result	Rank	Opposition Result	Opposition Result	Opposition Result	Opposition Result	Rank
Denny Heister	Men's singles	Wang (CHN); L 1–2	Tsiokas (GRE); L 0–2	Mutambuze (UGA); W 2–0	3	Did not advance				
Denny Heister; Trinko Keen	Men's doubles	Persson / Waldner (SWE); L 1–2	Tasaki / Yuzawa (JPN); W 2–1	Morales / Salamanca (CHI); W 2–0	2	—N/a	Did not advance			
Gerdi Keen	Women's singles	Lijuan (CAN); L 0–2	Park (KOR); L 0–2	—N/a	3	Did not advance				
Bettine Vriesekoop	Women's singles	Bădescu (ROU); L 0–2	Paškauskienė (LTU); L 1–2	Radhika (IND); W 2–0	3	Did not advance				
Mirjam Hoorman-Kloppenburg	Women's singles	Chai (HKG); L 0–2	Simion (ROU); L 0–2	Ramos (VEN); W 2–0	3	Did not advance				
Bettine Vriesekoop; Emily Noor	Women's doubles	Palina / Timina (RUS); L 0–2	Wang / Yip (USA); L 0–2	Kaffo / Oshonaike (NGR); W 2–0	3	—N/a	Did not advance			
Gerdi Keen; Mirjam Hoorman-Kloppenburg	Women's doubles	Koyama / Todo (JPN); L 0–2	Schall / Struse (GER); L 1–2	Arisi / Negrisoli (ITA); W 2–1	3	—N/a	Did not advance			

== Tennis ==
Men

Athlete	Event	Round of 64	Round of 32	Round of 16	Quarterfinals	Semifinals	Final / BM	
Athlete	Event	Opposition Score	Opposition Score	Opposition Score	Opposition Score	Opposition Score	Opposition Score	Rank
Jacco Eltingh	Singles	Fetterlein (DEN); L 4–6, 6–4, 6–8	Did not advance					
Paul Haarhuis	Singles	Philippoussis (AUS); L 6–7, 6–7	Did not advance					
Jan Siemerink	Singles	Woodbridge (AUS); L 2–6, 4–6	Did not advance					
Jacco Eltingh; Paul Haarhuis	Doubles	—N/a	Pavel / Pescariu (ROU); W 6–2, 6–7^{(1–7)}, 6–4	C N'Goran / C N'Goran (CIV); W 6–4, 6–4	W Ferreira / E Ferreira (RSA); W 7–6^{(7–4)}, 7–6^{(7–4)}	Woodbridge / Woodforde (AUS); L 2–6 7–5 16–18	Prinosil / Goellner (GER); L 2–6 5–7	4

Women

Athlete	Event	Round of 64	Round of 32	Round of 16	Quarterfinals	Semifinals	Final / BM	
Athlete	Event	Opposition Score	Opposition Score	Opposition Score	Opposition Score	Opposition Score	Opposition Score	Rank
Brenda Schultz-McCarthy	Singles	Sfar (TUN); W 6–4, 6–0	Choi (KOR); W 6–2 6–4	Sánchez Vicario (ESP); L 4–6 6–7	Did not advance			
Manon Bollegraf; Brenda Schultz-McCarthy	Doubles	—N/a	Lugina / Medvedeva (UKR); W w/o	Csurgo / Temesvári (HUN); W 7–6 7–6	Hingis / Schnyder (SUI); W 6–4 6–3	MJ Fernández / G Fernández (USA); L 5–7 6–7	Sánchez Vicario / Martínez (ESP); L 1–6 3–6	4

== Volleyball ==
=== Beach ===
Athlete	Event	First round	Second round	Third round	Fourth round	Elimination					Semifinal	Final / BM	
Athlete	Event	Opposition Result	Opposition Result	Opposition Result	Opposition Result	Opposition Result	Opposition Result	Opposition Result	Opposition Result	Opposition Result	Opposition Result	Opposition Result	Rank
Michel Everaert; Sander Mulder	Men's	Maia – Brenha (POR); L 15–8	did not advance			Palinek – Pakosta (CZE); L 15–6	did not advance						=17
Debora Schoon-Kadijk; Lisette van de Ven	Women's	Bye	Castro – Richardson (USA); L 15–8	did not advance			Cooper – Glover (GBR); L 15–12	did not advance					=13

=== Indoor ===
Summary

Team	Event	Preliminary round						Quarterfinal	Semifinal / Pl.	Final / BM / Pl.	
Team	Event	Opposition Result	Opposition Result	Opposition Result	Opposition Result	Opposition Result	Rank	Opposition Result	Opposition Result	Opposition Result	Rank
Netherlands men	Men's tournament	Tunisia; W 3–0	Russia; W 3–0	Italy; L 0–3	Yugoslavia; W 3–0	South Korea; W 3–0	2 Q	Bulgaria; W 3–1	Russia; W 3–0	Italy; W 3–2	1st place, gold medalist(s)
Netherlands women	Women's tournament	China; L 1–3	United States; L 0–3	Japan; W 3–0	South Korea; W 3–1	Ukraine; W 3–0	3	Russia; L 1–3	5-8 semifinal Germany; W 3-2	5th place match South Korea; W 3–0	5

==== Men ====
- Team roster

- Peter Blangé
- Bas van de Goor
- Mike van de Goor
- Rob Grabert
- Henk-Jan Held
- Guido Görtzen
- Misha Latuhihin
- Olof van der Meulen
- Jan Posthuma
- Brecht Rodenburg
- Richard Schuil
- Ron Zwerver

- Head coach: Joop Alberda

==== Women ====
- Team roster

- Cintha Boersma
- Erna Brinkman
- Riëtte Fledderus
- Jerine Fleurke
- Marjolein de Jong
- Saskia van Hintum
- Elles Leferink
- Irena Machovcak
- Claudia van Thiel
- Lisette van der Ven
- Ingrid Visser
- Henriëtte Weersing

- Head coach: Bert Goedkoop

== Water polo ==
=== Men's team competition ===
Summary

Team	Event	Preliminary round						Classification			Quarterfinal	Semifinal / Pl.	Final / BM / Pl.	
Team	Event	Opposition Result	Opposition Result	Opposition Result	Opposition Result	Opposition Result	Rank	Opposition Result	Opposition Result	Opposition Result	Opposition Result	Opposition Result	Opposition Result	Rank
United States men	Men's tournament	Yugoslavia; L 8–11	Spain; L 7–8	Hungary; L 8–10	Russia; L 5–11	Germany; L 8–9	6	Romania; W 10–8	Germany; L 6–9	Ukraine; D 9–9	Did not advance			10

Team roster
- Arie van de Bunt
- Gert de Groot
- Arno Havenga
- Koos Issard
- Bas de Jong
- Niels van der Kolk
- Marco Kunz
- Harry van der Meer
- Hans Nieuwenburg
- Joeri Stoffels
- Eelco Uri
- Wyco de Vries
- Hans van Zeeland (Head Coach)
