= Rowing at the 1996 Summer Olympics – Men's quadruple sculls =

Olympic rowing event

Men's quadruple sculls at the Games of the XXVI Olympiad
- Venue: Lake Lanier Olympic Center
- Date: 21–28 July 1996
- Competitors: 56 from 14 nations
- Winning time: 5:56.93

Medalists
1st place, gold medalist(s)		André Steiner; Andreas Hajek; Stephan Volkert; André Willms	Germany
2nd place, silver medalist(s)		Tim Young; Brian Jamieson; Eric Mueller; Jason Gailes	United States
3rd place, bronze medalist(s)		Janusz Hooker; Duncan Free; Ronald Snook; Bo Hanson	Australia

The men's quadruple sculls competition at the 1996 Summer Olympics in Atlanta, Georgia took place at Lake Lanier.

== Competition format ==
This rowing event is a quadruple scull event, meaning that each boat is propelled by four rowers. The "scull" portion means that each rower uses two oars, one on each side of the boat; this contrasts with sweep rowing in which each rower has one oar and rows on only one side. The competition consisted of multiple rounds. Finals were held to determine the placing of each boat; these finals were given letters with those nearer to the beginning of the alphabet meaning a better ranking. Semifinals were named based on which finals they fed, with each semifinal having two possible finals.

With 14 boats in heats, the best 9 boats qualify directly for the semi-finals. All other boats progress to the repechage round, which offers a second chance to qualify for the semi-finals. 2 unsuccessful boats from the repechage are eliminated from the competition. The best three boats in each of the two semi-finals qualify for final A, which determines places 1–6 (including the medals). Unsuccessful boats from semi-finals A/B go forward to final B, which determines places 7–12

== Results ==
=== Heats ===
The first 3 boats in each heat advanced to the semifinals, remainder went to the repechage.

==== Heat 1 ====
Rank	Rower	Country	Time	Notes
1	Janusz Hooker, Duncan Free, Ronald Snook, Bo Hanson	Australia	6:05.60	Q
2	Sander van der Marck, Adri Middag, Joris Loefs, Pieter van Andel	Netherlands	6:06.98	Q
3	Konstantin Belevich, Sergey Tarasevich, Oleg Solomakhin, Denis Tabako	Belarus	6:08.38	Q
4	Yves Lamarque, Vincent Lepvraud, Sébastien Vieilledent, Fabrice LeClerc	France	6:12.69	R
5	Jarosław Nowicki, Przemysław Lewandowski, Marek Kolbowicz, Piotr Bujnarowski	Poland	6:52.62	R

==== Heat 2 ====
Rank	Rower	Country	Time	Notes
1	Massimo Paradiso, Alessandro Corona, Rossano Galtarossa, Alessio Sartori	Italy	6:05.75	Q
2	Tim Young, Brian Jamieson, Eric Mueller, Jason Gailes	United States	6:06.95	Q
3	Igor Kravtsov, Nikolay Spinyov, Georgy Nikitin, Vladimir Sokolov	Russia	6:10.62	Q
4	Carlos Pages, Santiago Fernández, Rubén Knulst, Guillermo Pfaab	Argentina	6:16.16	R
5	André Costa, Giovanni Valentina, Oswaldo Kuster Neto, Alexander Altair Soares	Brazil	6:36.30	R

==== Heat 3 ====
Rank	Rower	Country	Time	Notes
1	André Steiner, Stephan Volkert, Andreas Hajek, André Willms	Germany	6:06.33	Q
2	René Benguerel, Michael Erdlen, Ueli Bodenmann, Simon Stürm	Switzerland	6:08.37	Q
3	Johan Flodin, Pontus Ek, Fredrik Hultén, Henrik Nilsson	Sweden	6:10.39	Q
4	Oleksandr Marchenko, Oleksandr Zaskalko, Mykola Chupryna, Leonid Shaposhnikov	Ukraine	6:13.04	R

=== Repechage ===
First three qualify to semifinals.

==== Repechage 1 ====
Rank	Rower	Country	Time	Notes
1	Jarosław Nowicki, Przemysław Lewandowski, Marek Kolbowicz, Piotr Bujnarowski	Poland	5:51.15	Q
2	Oleksandr Marchenko, Oleksandr Zaskalko, Mykola Chupryna, Leonid Shaposhnikov	Ukraine	5:51.51	Q
3	Yves Lamarque, Vincent Lepvraud, Sébastien Vieilledent, Fabrice LeClerc	France	5:51.82	Q
4	Carlos Pages, Santiago Fernández, Rubén Knulst, Guillermo Pfaab	Argentina	5:52.89	
5	André Costa, Giovanni Valentina, Oswaldo Kuster Neto, Alexander Altair Soares	Brazil	6:12.86	

=== Semifinals ===
First three places advance to Final A, the remainder to Final B.

==== Semifinal 1 ====
Rank	Rower	Country	Time	Notes
1	Massimo Paradiso, Alessandro Corona, Rossano Galtarossa, Alessio Sartori	Italy	5:57.10	A
2	Janusz Hooker, Duncan Free, Ronald Snook, Bo Hanson	Australia	5:58.41	A
3	René Benguerel, Michael Erdlen, Ueli Bodenmann, Simon Stürm	Switzerland	5:59.63	A
4	Igor Kravtsov, Nikolay Spinyov, Georgy Nikitin, Vladimir Sokolov	Russia	5:59.91	B
5	Yves Lamarque, Vincent Lepvraud, Sébastien Vieilledent, Fabrice LeClerc	France	6:03.74	B
6	Konstantin Belevich, Sergey Tarasevich, Oleg Solomakhin, Denis Tabako	Belarus	6:15.07	B

==== Semifinal 2 ====
Rank	Rower	Country	Time	Notes
1	André Steiner, Stephan Volkert, Andreas Hajek, André Willms	Germany	5:55.10	A
2	Tim Young, Brian Jamieson, Eric Mueller, Jason Gailes	United States	5:57.97	A
3	Johan Flodin, Pontus Ek, Fredrik Hultén, Henrik Nilsson	Sweden	6:00.09	A
4	Sander van der Marck, Adri Middag, Joris Loefs, Pieter van Andel	Netherlands	6:03.72	B
5	Oleksandr Marchenko, Oleksandr Zaskalko, Mykola Chupryna, Leonid Shaposhnikov	Ukraine	6:05.65	B
6	Jarosław Nowicki, Przemysław Lewandowski, Marek Kolbowicz, Piotr Bujnarowski	Poland	6:11.62	B

=== Finals ===
==== Final B ====
Rank	Rower	Country	Time	Notes
7	Oleksandr Marchenko, Oleksandr Zaskalko, Mykola Chupryna, Leonid Shaposhnikov	Ukraine	5:53.46	
8	Igor Kravtsov, Nikolay Spinyov, Georgy Nikitin, Vladimir Sokolov	Russia	5:54.98	
9	Jarosław Nowicki, Przemysław Lewandowski, Marek Kolbowicz, Piotr Bujnarowski	Poland	5:55.10	
10	Sander van der Marck, Adri Middag, Joris Loefs, Pieter van Andel	Netherlands	5:55.15	
11	Konstantin Belevich, Sergey Tarasevich, Oleg Solomakhin, Denis Tabako	Belarus	5:55.52	
12	Yves Lamarque, Vincent Lepvraud, Sébastien Vieilledent, Fabrice LeClerc	France	6:00.48	

==== Final A ====
Rank	Rower	Country	Time	Notes
1st place, gold medalist(s)	André Steiner, Stephan Volkert, Andreas Hajek, André Willms	Germany	5:56.93	
2nd place, silver medalist(s)	Tim Young, Brian Jamieson, Eric Mueller, Jason Gailes	United States	5:59.10	
3rd place, bronze medalist(s)	Janusz Hooker, Duncan Free, Ronald Snook, Bo Hanson	Australia	6:01.65	
4	Massimo Paradiso, Alessandro Corona, Rossano Galtarossa, Alessio Sartori	Italy	6:02.12	
5	René Benguerel, Michael Erdlen, Ueli Bodenmann, Simon Stürm	Switzerland	6:04.52	
6	Johan Flodin, Pontus Ek, Fredrik Hultén, Henrik Nilsson	Sweden	6:07.75	
