= Czech Republic at the Olympics =

- IOC code: CZE
- NOC: Czech Olympic Committee
- Website: www.olympic.cz (in Czech and English)
- Medals Ranked 38th: Gold 34 Silver 35 Bronze 42 Total 111

Summer appearances
- 1996; 2000; 2004; 2008; 2012; 2016; 2020; 2024

Winter appearances
- 1994; 1998; 2002; 2006; 2010; 2014; 2018; 2022; 2026

Other related appearances
- Bohemia (1900–1912); Czechoslovakia (1924–1992)

The Czech Republic first participated at the Olympic Games as an independent nation in 1994, and has competed in every Summer Olympic Games and Winter Olympic Games since then. Prior to the dissolution of Czechoslovakia in 1993, Czech athletes had competed at the Olympics from 1920 to 1992 as Czechoslovakia and from 1900 to 1912 as Bohemia. The country's National Olympic Committee is the Czech Olympic Committee, which was founded as the Bohemian Committee for the Olympic Games in 1899, and recognized in its current form by the International Olympic Committee (IOC) after the dissolution of Czechoslovakia in 1993. At the Czech Olympic Committee's 2022 request, the IOC officially began using the country's short name, Czechia.

Athletes from the country have won a total of 72 medals at the Summer Games, with canoeing, athletics and shooting as the top medal-producing sports. The nation has also won 34 medals at the Winter Games, mostly in cross-country skiing, speed skating, and ultimately popular ice hockey. In terms of medal count, the most decorated Czech Olympian in the post-Czechoslovak period is speed skater Martina Sáblíková (7 medals between 2010 and 2022).

== Timeline of participation ==
| Olympic Years | Teams | |
|---|---|---|
| 1900–1912 | Bohemia | as part of Hungary |
| 1920–1992 | Czechoslovakia | |
| 1994–present | Czech Republic | Slovakia |

== Medal tables ==
=== Medals by Summer Games ===
| Games | Athletes | Gold | Silver | Bronze | Total | Rank |
| 1900–1912 | as Bohemia | | | | | |
| 1920–1992 | as part of Czechoslovakia | | | | | |
| (United States) 1996 Atlanta | 115 | 4 | 3 | 4 | 11 | 17 |
| (Australia) 2000 Sydney | 119 | 2 | 3 | 3 | 8 | 28 |
| (Greece) 2004 Athens | 142 | 1 | 3 | 5 | 9 | 42 |
| (China) 2008 Beijing | 134 | 3 | 3 | 1 | 7 | 24 |
| (United Kingdom) 2012 London | 133 | 4 | 4 | 3 | 11 | 19 |
| (Brazil) 2016 Rio de Janeiro | 105 | 1 | 2 | 7 | 10 | 43 |
| (Japan) 2020 Tokyo | 115 | 4 | 4 | 3 | 11 | 18 |
| (France) 2024 Paris | 111 | 3 | 0 | 2 | 5 | 28 |
| (United States) 2028 Los Angeles | future event | | | | | |
| (Australia) 2032 Brisbane | future event | | | | | |
| Total | | 22 | 22 | 28 | 72 | 44 |

=== Medals by Winter Games ===
| Games | Athletes | Gold | Silver | Bronze | Total | Rank |
| 1920–1992 | as part of Czechoslovakia | | | | | |
| (Norway) 1994 Lillehammer | 63 | 0 | 0 | 0 | 0 | – |
| (Japan) 1998 Nagano | 61 | 1 | 1 | 1 | 3 | 14 |
| (United States) 2002 Salt Lake City | 76 | 1 | 2 | 0 | 3 | 16 |
| (Italy) 2006 Turin | 84 | 1 | 2 | 1 | 4 | 15 |
| (Canada) 2010 Vancouver | 92 | 2 | 0 | 4 | 6 | 14 |
| (Russia) 2014 Sochi | 88 | 2 | 4 | 3 | 9 | 15 |
| (South Korea) 2018 Pyeongchang | 93 | 2 | 2 | 3 | 7 | 14 |
| (China) 2022 Beijing | 114 | 1 | 0 | 1 | 2 | 21 |
| (Italy) 2026 Milano Cortina | 115 | 2 | 2 | 1 | 5 | 16 |
| (France) 2030 French Alps | future event | | | | | |
| (United States) 2034 Utah | future event | | | | | |
| Total | | 12 | 13 | 14 | 39 | 18 |

=== Medals by summer sport ===
| Sport | Gold | Silver | Bronze | Total |
|---|---|---|---|---|
| Canoeing | 7 | 6 | 6 | 19 |
| Athletics | 5 | 3 | 8 | 16 |
| Shooting | 3 | 4 | 4 | 11 |
| Tennis | 2 | 3 | 4 | 9 |
| Judo | 2 | 0 | 0 | 2 |
| Rowing | 1 | 3 | 1 | 5 |
| Cycling | 1 | 1 | 0 | 2 |
| Modern pentathlon | 1 | 0 | 1 | 2 |
| Boxing | 0 | 1 | 0 | 1 |
| Sailing | 0 | 1 | 0 | 1 |
| Fencing | 0 | 0 | 2 | 2 |
| Triathlon | 0 | 0 | 1 | 1 |
| Wrestling | 0 | 0 | 1 | 1 |
| Totals (13 entries) | 22 | 22 | 28 | 72 |

=== Medals by winter sport ===
| Sport | Gold | Silver | Bronze | Total |
|---|---|---|---|---|
| Speed skating | 4 | 3 | 3 | 10 |
| Snowboarding | 4 | 1 | 1 | 6 |
| Cross-country skiing | 1 | 5 | 3 | 9 |
| Alpine skiing | 1 | 0 | 1 | 2 |
| Ice hockey | 1 | 0 | 1 | 2 |
| Freestyle skiing | 1 | 0 | 0 | 1 |
| Biathlon | 0 | 4 | 5 | 9 |
| Totals (7 entries) | 12 | 13 | 14 | 39 |

== List of medalists ==
=== Summer Games ===
| Medal | Name | Games | Sport | Event |
|---|---|---|---|---|
| Gold | Jan Železný | 1996 Atlanta | Athletics | Men's javelin throw |
| Gold | Martin Doktor | 1996 Atlanta | Canoeing | Men's C-1 1000 metres |
| Gold | Martin Doktor | 1996 Atlanta | Canoeing | Men's C-1 500 metres |
| Gold | Štěpánka Hilgertová | 1996 Atlanta | Canoeing | Women's slalom K-1 |
| Silver | Lukáš Pollert | 1996 Atlanta | Canoeing | Men's slalom C-1 |
| Silver | Jiří Rohan; Miroslav Šimek | 1996 Atlanta | Canoeing | Men's slalom C-2 |
| Silver | Jana Novotná; Helena Suková | 1996 Atlanta | Tennis | Women's doubles |
| Bronze | Tomáš Dvořák | 1996 Atlanta | Athletics | Men's decathlon |
| Bronze | Šárka Kašpárková | 1996 Atlanta | Athletics | Women's triple jump |
| Bronze | Miroslav Januš | 1996 Atlanta | Shooting | Men's 10 metre running target |
| Bronze | Jana Novotná | 1996 Atlanta | Tennis | Women's singles |
| Gold | Jan Železný | 2000 Sydney | Athletics | Men's javelin throw |
| Gold | Štěpánka Hilgertová | 2000 Sydney | Canoeing | Women's slalom K-1 |
| Silver | Roman Šebrle | 2000 Sydney | Athletics | Men's decathlon |
| Silver | Rudolf Kraj | 2000 Sydney | Boxing | Men's light heavyweight |
| Silver | Petr Málek | 2000 Sydney | Shooting | Men's skeet |
| Bronze | Marek Jiras; Tomáš Máder | 2000 Sydney | Canoeing | Men's slalom C-2 |
| Bronze | Martin Tenk | 2000 Sydney | Shooting | Men's 50 metre pistol |
| Bronze | Jan Řehula | 2000 Sydney | Triathlon | Men's competition |
| Gold | Roman Šebrle | 2004 Athens | Athletics | Men's decathlon |
| Silver | David Kopřiva; Tomáš Karas; Jakub Hanák; David Jirka | 2004 Athens | Rowing | Men's quadruple sculls |
| Silver | Lenka Šmídová | 2004 Athens | Sailing | Women's Europe class |
| Silver | Lenka Hyková | 2004 Athens | Shooting | Women's 25 m pistol |
| Bronze | Jaroslav Bába | 2004 Athens | Athletics | Men's high jump |
| Bronze | Věra Pospíšilová-Cechlová | 2004 Athens | Athletics | Women's Discus Throw |
| Bronze | Ondřej Štěpánek; Jaroslav Volf | 2004 Athens | Canoeing | Men's slalom C-2 |
| Bronze | Libor Capalini | 2004 Athens | Modern pentathlon | Men's competition |
| Bronze | Kateřina Kůrková | 2004 Athens | Shooting | Women's 10 m air rifle |
| Gold | Barbora Špotáková | 2008 Beijing | Athletics | Women's javelin throw |
| Gold | David Kostelecký | 2008 Beijing | Shooting | Men's trap |
| Gold | Kateřina Emmons | 2008 Beijing | Shooting | Women's 10 metre air rifle |
| Silver | Ondřej Štěpánek; Jaroslav Volf | 2008 Beijing | Canoeing | Men's slalom C-2 |
| Silver | Kateřina Emmons | 2008 Beijing | Shooting | Women's 50 metre rifle three positions |
| Silver | Ondřej Synek | 2008 Beijing | Rowing | Men's single sculls |
| Bronze | Marek Švec | 2008 Beijing | Wrestling | Men's Greco-Roman 96 kg |
| Gold | Barbora Špotáková | 2012 London | Athletics | Women's javelin throw |
| Gold | Jaroslav Kulhavý | 2012 London | Cycling | Men's cross-country |
| Gold | David Svoboda | 2012 London | Modern pentathlon | Men's |
| Gold | Miroslava Knapková | 2012 London | Rowing | Women's single sculls |
| Silver | Vavřinec Hradilek | 2012 London | Canoeing | Men's slalom K-1 |
| Silver | Ondřej Synek | 2012 London | Rowing | Men's single sculls |
| Silver | Andrea Hlaváčková; Lucie Hradecká | 2012 London | Tennis | Women's doubles |
| Silver | Zuzana Hejnová | 2012 London | Athletics | Women's 400 m hurdles |
| Bronze | Josef Dostál; Daniel Havel; Jan Štěrba; Lukáš Trefil | 2012 London | Canoeing | Men's K-4 1000 m |
| Bronze | Adéla Sýkorová | 2012 London | Shooting | Women's 50 m rifle three positions |
| Bronze | Vítězslav Veselý | 2012 London | Athletics | Men's javelin throw |
| Gold | Lukáš Krpálek | 2016 Rio de Janeiro | Judo | Men's 100 kg |
| Silver | Josef Dostál | 2016 Rio de Janeiro | Canoeing | Men's K-1 1000 m |
| Silver | Jaroslav Kulhavý | 2016 Rio de Janeiro | Cycling | Men's cross-country |
| Bronze | Jiří Prskavec | 2016 Rio de Janeiro | Canoeing | Men's slalom K-1 |
| Bronze | Ondřej Synek | 2016 Rio de Janeiro | Rowing | Men's single sculls |
| Bronze | Petra Kvitová | 2016 Rio de Janeiro | Tennis | Women's singles |
| Bronze | Lucie Šafářová; Barbora Strýcová | 2016 Rio de Janeiro | Tennis | Women's doubles |
| Bronze | Lucie Hradecká; Radek Štěpánek | 2016 Rio de Janeiro | Tennis | Mixed doubles |
| Bronze | Barbora Špotáková | 2016 Rio de Janeiro | Athletics | Women's javelin throw |
| Bronze | Josef Dostál; Daniel Havel; Jan Štěrba; Lukáš Trefil | 2016 Rio de Janeiro | Canoeing | Men's K-4 1000 m |
| Gold | Jiří Lipták | 2020 Tokyo | Shooting | Men's trap |
| Gold | Lukáš Krpálek | 2020 Tokyo | Judo | Men's 100 kg |
| Gold | Jiří Prskavec | 2020 Tokyo | Canoeing | Men's K-1 slalom |
| Gold | Barbora Krejčíková; Kateřina Siniaková | 2020 Tokyo | Tennis | Women's doubles |
| Silver | David Kostelecký | 2020 Tokyo | Shooting | Men's trap |
| Silver | Lukáš Rohan | 2020 Tokyo | Canoeing | Men's C-1 slalom |
| Silver | Markéta Vondroušová | 2020 Tokyo | Tennis | Women's singles |
| Silver | Jakub Vadlejch | 2020 Tokyo | Athletics | Men's javelin throw |
| Bronze | Alexander Choupenitch | 2020 Tokyo | Fencing | Men's foil |
| Bronze | Josef Dostál; Radek Šlouf | 2020 Tokyo | Canoeing | K-2 1000 metres |
| Bronze | Vítězslav Veselý | 2020 Tokyo | Athletics | Men's javelin throw |
| Gold | Tomáš Macháč; Kateřina Siniaková | 2024 Paris | Tennis | Mixed doubles |
| Gold | Martin Fuksa | 2024 Paris | Canoeing | Men's C-1 1000 metres |
| Gold | Josef Dostál | 2024 Paris | Canoeing | Men's K-1 1000 metres |
| Bronze | Jakub Jurka; Michal Čupr; Martin Rubeš; Jiří Beran | 2024 Paris | Fencing | Men's team épée |
| Bronze | Nikola Ogrodníková | 2024 Paris | Athletics | Women's javelin throw |

=== Winter Games ===
| Medal | Name | Games | Sport | Event |
|---|---|---|---|---|
| Gold | Ice hockey team Josef Beránek; Jan Čaloun; Roman Čechmánek; Jiří Dopita; Roman Hamrlík; Dominik Hašek; Milan Hejduk; Milan Hnilička; Jaromír Jágr; František Kučera; Robert Lang; David Moravec; Pavel Patera; Libor Procházka; Martin Procházka; Robert Reichel; Martin Ručinský; Vladimír Růžička; Jiří Šlégr; Richard Šmehlík; Jaroslav Špaček; Martin Straka; Petr Svoboda | 1998 Nagano | Ice hockey | Men's competition |
| Silver | Kateřina Neumannová | 1998 Nagano | Cross-country skiing | Women's 5 km |
| Bronze | Kateřina Neumannová | 1998 Nagano | Cross-country skiing | Women's pursuit |
| Gold | Aleš Valenta | 2002 Salt Lake City | Freestyle skiing | Men's aerials |
| Silver | Kateřina Neumannová | 2002 Salt Lake City | Cross-country skiing | Women's 15 km |
| Silver | Kateřina Neumannová | 2002 Salt Lake City | Cross-country skiing | Women's pursuit |
| Gold | Kateřina Neumannová | 2006 Turin | Cross-country skiing | Women's 30 km |
| Silver | Kateřina Neumannová | 2006 Turin | Cross-country skiing | Women's pursuit |
| Silver | Lukáš Bauer | 2006 Turin | Cross-country skiing | Men's 15 km |
| Bronze | Ice hockey team Jan Bulis; Petr Čajánek; Patrik Eliáš; Martin Erat; Dominik Hašek; Milan Hejduk; Aleš Hemský; Milan Hnilička; Jaromír Jágr; František Kaberle; Tomáš Kaberle; Aleš Kotalík; Filip Kuba; Pavel Kubina; Robert Lang; Marek Malík; Rostislav Olesz; Václav Prospal; Martin Ručinský; Dušan Salfický; Jaroslav Špaček; Martin Straka; Tomáš Vokoun; David Výborný; Marek Židlický | 2006 Turin | Ice hockey | Men's competition |
| Gold | Martina Sáblíková | 2010 Vancouver | Speed skating | Women's 3000 metres |
| Gold | Martina Sáblíková | 2010 Vancouver | Speed skating | Women's 5000 metres |
| Bronze | Šárka Záhrobská | 2010 Vancouver | Alpine skiing | Women's slalom |
| Bronze | Lukáš Bauer | 2010 Vancouver | Cross-country skiing | Men's 15 kilometre freestyle |
| Bronze | Martin Jakš; Lukáš Bauer; Jiří Magál; Martin Koukal | 2010 Vancouver | Cross-country skiing | Men's 4 x 10 kilometre relay |
| Bronze | Martina Sáblíková | 2010 Vancouver | Speed skating | Women's 1500 metres |
| Gold | Eva Samková | 2014 Sochi | Snowboarding | Women's snowboard cross |
| Gold | Martina Sáblíková | 2014 Sochi | Speed skating | Women's 5000 metres |
| Silver | Ondřej Moravec | 2014 Sochi | Biathlon | Men's pursuit |
| Silver | Gabriela Soukalová | 2014 Sochi | Biathlon | Women's mass start |
| Silver | Veronika Vítková; Gabriela Soukalová; Jaroslav Soukup; Ondřej Moravec | 2014 Sochi | Biathlon | Mixed relay |
| Silver | Martina Sáblíková | 2014 Sochi | Speed skating | Women's 3000 metres |
| Bronze | Jaroslav Soukup | 2014 Sochi | Biathlon | Men's sprint |
| Bronze | Ondřej Moravec | 2014 Sochi | Biathlon | Men's mass start |
| Bronze | Eva Puskarčíková; Gabriela Soukalová; Jitka Landová; Veronika Vítková | 2014 Sochi | Biathlon | Women's relay |
| Gold | Ester Ledecká | 2018 Pyeongchang | Alpine skiing | Women's super-G |
| Gold | Ester Ledecká | 2018 Pyeongchang | Snowboarding | Women's parallel giant slalom |
| Silver | Michal Krčmář | 2018 Pyeongchang | Biathlon | Men's sprint |
| Silver | Martina Sáblíková | 2018 Pyeongchang | Speed skating | Women's 5000 metres |
| Bronze | Veronika Vítková | 2018 Pyeongchang | Biathlon | Women's sprint |
| Bronze | Karolína Erbanová | 2018 Pyeongchang | Speed skating | Women's 500 metres |
| Bronze | Eva Samková | 2018 Pyeongchang | Snowboarding | Women's snowboard cross |
| Gold | Ester Ledecká | 2022 Beijing | Snowboarding | Women's parallel giant slalom |
| Bronze | Martina Sáblíková | 2022 Beijing | Speed skating | Women's 5000 metres |
| Gold | Zuzana Maděrová | 2026 Milano Cortina | Snowboarding | Women's parallel giant slalom |
| Gold | Metoděj Jílek | 2026 Milano Cortina | Speed skating | Men's 10,000 metres |
| Silver | Metoděj Jílek | 2026 Milano Cortina | Speed skating | Men's 5000 metres |
| Silver | Eva Adamczyková | 2026 Milano Cortina | Snowboarding | Women's snowboard cross |
| Bronze | Tereza Voborníková | 2026 Milano Cortina | Biathlon | Women's mass start |

== Multiple medalists ==
=== Summer games ===
The Czech athlete who won the most medals in the history of the Summer Olympic Games is the canoeist Josef Dostál with five medals.

Still active

| Athlete | Sport | Games | Gold | Silver | Bronze | Total |
|---|---|---|---|---|---|---|
| Josef Dostál | Canoeing | 2012, 2016, 2020, 2024 | 1 | 1 | 3 | 5 |
| Barbora Špotáková | Athletics | 2008, 2012, 2016 | 2 | 0 | 1 | 3 |
| Ondřej Synek | Rowing | 2008, 2012, 2016 | 0 | 2 | 1 | 3 |
| Martin Doktor | Canoeing | 1996 | 2 | 0 | 0 | 2 |
| Štěpánka Hilgertová | Canoeing | 1996, 2000 | 2 | 0 | 0 | 2 |
| Lukáš Krpálek | Judo | 2016, 2020 | 2 | 0 | 0 | 2 |
| Kateřina Siniaková | Tennis | 2020, 2024 | 2 | 0 | 0 | 2 |
| Jan Železný^{ZEL} | Athletics | 1996, 2000 | 2 | 0 | 0 | 2 |
| Kateřina Emmons | Shooting | 2008 | 1 | 1 | 0 | 2 |
| David Kostelecký | Shooting | 2008, 2020 | 1 | 1 | 0 | 2 |
| Jaroslav Kulhavý | Cycling | 2012, 2016 | 1 | 1 | 0 | 2 |
| Roman Šebrle | Athletics | 2000, 2004 | 1 | 1 | 0 | 2 |
| Jiří Prskavec | Canoeing | 2016, 2020 | 1 | 0 | 1 | 2 |
| Lucie Hradecká | Tennis | 2012, 2016 | 0 | 1 | 1 | 2 |
| Jana Novotná^{NOV} | Tennis | 1996 | 0 | 1 | 1 | 2 |
| Ondřej Štěpánek | Canoeing | 2004, 2008 | 0 | 1 | 1 | 2 |
| Jaroslav Volf | Canoeing | 2004, 2008 | 0 | 1 | 1 | 2 |
| Daniel Havel | Canoeing | 2012, 2016 | 0 | 0 | 2 | 2 |
| Jan Štěrba | Canoeing | 2012, 2016 | 0 | 0 | 2 | 2 |
| Lukáš Trefil | Canoeing | 2012, 2016 | 0 | 0 | 2 | 2 |
| Vítězslav Veselý | Athletics | 2012, 2020 | 0 | 0 | 2 | 2 |
| Lukáš Pollert^{POL} | Canoeing | 1996 | 0 | 1 | 0 | 1 |
| Helena Suková^{SUK} | Tennis | 1996 | 0 | 1 | 0 | 1 |
| Jiří Rohan^{ROH} | Canoeing | 1996 | 0 | 1 | 0 | 1 |
| Miroslav Šimek^{SIM} | Canoeing | 1996 | 0 | 1 | 0 | 1 |

^{ZEL} Jan Železný won two other medals in javelin throw for Czechoslovakia - gold at 1992 Olympics and silver at 1988 Olympics.
^{NOV} Jana Novotná won silver medal in women's doubles for Czechoslovakia at 1988 Olympics.
^{POL} Lukáš Pollert also won gold medal for Czechoslovakia in canoe slalom at the 1992 Olympics.
^{SUK} Helena Suková also won silver medal in women's doubles for Czechoslovakia at the 1988 Olympics.
^{ROH} Jiří Rohan also won silver medal Czechoslovakia in canoe slalom at the 1992 Olympics.
^{SIM} Miroslav Šimek also won silver medal Czechoslovakia in canoe slalom at the 1992 Olympics.

=== Winter games ===
The Czech athlete who won the most medals in the history of the Winter Olympic Games is the speed skater Martina Sáblíková with seven medals.

Still active

| Athlete | Sport | Games | Gold | Silver | Bronze | Total |
|---|---|---|---|---|---|---|
| Martina Sáblíková | Speed skating | 2010, 2014, 2018, 2022 | 3 | 2 | 2 | 7 |
| Kateřina Neumannová | Cross-country skiing | 1998, 2002, 2006 | 1 | 5 | 1 | 7 |
| Ester Ledecká | Snowboarding; Alpine skiing | 2018, 2022 | 3 | 0 | 0 | 3 |
| Eva Adamczyková | Snowboarding | 2014, 2018, 2026 | 1 | 1 | 1 | 3 |
| Ondřej Moravec | Biathlon | 2014 | 0 | 2 | 1 | 3 |
| Gabriela Soukalová | Biathlon | 2014 | 0 | 2 | 1 | 3 |
| Veronika Vítková | Biathlon | 2014, 2018 | 0 | 2 | 1 | 3 |
| Lukáš Bauer | Cross-country skiing | 2006, 2010 | 0 | 1 | 2 | 3 |
| Metoděj Jílek | Speed skating | 2026 | 1 | 1 | 0 | 2 |
| Dominik Hašek^{IH} | Ice hockey | 1998, 2006 | 1 | 0 | 1 | 2 |
| Milan Hejduk^{IH} | Ice hockey | 1998, 2006 | 1 | 0 | 1 | 2 |
| Milan Hnilička^{IH} | Ice hockey | 1998, 2006 | 1 | 0 | 1 | 2 |
| Jaromír Jágr^{IH} | Ice hockey | 1998, 2006 | 1 | 0 | 1 | 2 |
| Robert Lang^{IH} ^{CZE} | Ice hockey | 1998, 2006 | 1 | 0 | 1 | 2 |
| Martin Ručinský^{IH} | Ice hockey | 1998, 2006 | 1 | 0 | 1 | 2 |
| Martin Straka^{IH} | Ice hockey | 1998, 2006 | 1 | 0 | 1 | 2 |
| Jaroslav Špaček^{IH} | Ice hockey | 1998, 2006 | 1 | 0 | 1 | 2 |
| Jaroslav Soukup | Biathlon | 2014 | 0 | 1 | 1 | 2 |
| Jiří Šlégr^{CZE} | Ice hockey | 1998 | 1 | 0 | 0 | 1 |
| Richard Šmehlík^{CZE} | Ice hockey | 1998 | 1 | 0 | 0 | 1 |

^{IH} As a part of the Czech national ice hockey team.
^{CZE} Robert Lang, Jiří Šlégr and Richard Šmehlík also won bronze medal in ice hockey at 1992 Olympics as a part of the Czechoslovakia national ice hockey team.

== See also ==
- List of flag bearers for the Czech Republic at the Olympics
- Category:Olympic competitors for the Czech Republic
- Czech Republic at the Youth Olympics
- Czech Republic at the Paralympics
- Bohemia at the Olympics
- Czechoslovakia at the Olympics
