= Rowing at the 2004 Summer Olympics – Men's quadruple sculls =

Men's quadruple sculls at the Games of the XXVIII Olympiad
- Competitors: 52 from 13 nations

Medalists
1st place, gold medalist(s)		Nikolay Spinyov; Igor Kravtsov; Aleksey Svirin; Sergey Fedorovtsev	Russia
2nd place, silver medalist(s)		David Kopřiva; Tomáš Karas; Jakub Hanák; David Jirka	Czech Republic
3rd place, bronze medalist(s)		Serhiy Grin; Serhiy Biloushchenko; Oleh Lykov; Leonid Shaposhnykov	Ukraine

These are the results of the men's quadruple sculls competition in rowing at the 2004 Summer Olympics in Athens, Greece. It was one of eight events in men's rowing that was held.

Gold	Silver	Bronze
Russia; Nikolay Spinyov; Igor Kravtsov; Aleksey Svirin; Sergey Fedorovtsev	Czech Republic; David Kopřiva; Tomáš Karas; Jakub Hanák; David Jirka	Ukraine; Sergij Grin; Serhiy Biloushchenko; Oleh Lykov; Leonid Shaposhnykov

== Heats ==
Fourteen boats raced in three heats on August 14. The top three boats in each heat advanced to the semifinals, and the remaining boats moved to the repechage.

- SF denotes qualification to semifinal
- R denotes qualification to repechage

=== Heat 1 ===
Rank	Country	Athlete Name	Time	Notes
1	Germany	André Willms, Stephan Volkert, Marco Geisler and Robert Sens	5:43.17	SF
2	Estonia	Oleg Vinogradov, Igor Kuzmin, Andrei Šilin and Andrei Jämsä	5:45.56	SF
3	Australia	Scott Brennan, David Crawshay, Duncan Free and Shaun Coulton	5:46.32	SF
4	United States	Ben Holbrook, Brett Wilkinson, Sloan DuRoss and Kent Smack	5:50.61	R
5	Switzerland	Simon Stürm, Christian Stofer, Olivier Gremaud and Florian Stofer	6:20.67	R

=== Heat 2 ===
Rank	Country	Athlete Name	Time	Notes
1	Poland	Adam Bronikowski, Marek Kolbowicz, Sławomir Kruszkowski and Adam Korol	5:41.98	SF
2	Russia	Sergey Fedorovtsev, Igor Kravtsov, Aleksey Svirin and Nikolay Spinyov	5:43.77	SF
3	Italy	Alessandro Corona, Simone Venier, Federico Gattinoni and Simone Raineri	5:45.84	SF
4	France	Xavier Philippe, Cédric Berrest, Jonathan Coeffic and Frédéric Perrier	5:50.74	R

=== Heat 3 ===
Rank	Country	Athlete Name	Time	Notes
1	Czech Republic	David Kopřiva, Tomáš Karas, Jakub Hanák and David Jirka	5:40.83	SF
2	Ukraine	Sergij Grin, Serhiy Biloushchenko, Oleh Lykov and Leonid Shaposhnykov	5:43.23	SF
3	Belarus	Valery Rodevich, Stanislau Shcharbachenia, Pavel Shurmei and Andrey Pleshkov	5:46.80	SF
4	Great Britain	Simon Cottle, Alan Campbell, Peter Gardner and Peter Wells	5:54.69	R

== Repechage - August 17 ==
1. United States: Ben Holbrook, Brett Wilkinson, Sloan DuRoss and Kent Smack, 5:46.54 -> Semifinal A/B
2. Switzerland: Simon Stürm, Christian Stofer, Olivier Gremaud and Florian Stofer, 5:47.94 -> Semifinal A/B
3. Great Britain: Simon Cottle, Alan Campbell, Peter Gardner and Peter Wells, 5:48.65 -> Semifinal A/B
4. France: Xavier Philippe, Cédric Berrest, Jonathan Coeffic and Frédéric Perrier, 5:50.83

== Semifinals - August 19 ==
=== Semifinal A ===
1. Poland: Adam Bronikowski, Marek Kolbowicz, Sławomir Kruszkowski and Adam Korol, 5:42.63 -> Final A
2. Germany: André Willms, Stefan Volkert, Marco Geisler and Robert Sens, 5:42.85 -> Final A
3. Ukraine: Sergij Grin, Serhiy Biloushchenko, Oleh Lykov and Leonid Shaposhnykov, 5:44.00 -> Final A
4. Australia: Scott Brennan, David Crawshay, Duncan Free and Shaun Coulton, 5:45.45 -> Final B
5. Italy: Alessandro Corona, Simone Venier, Federico Gattinoni and Simone Raineri, 5:47.38 -> Final B
6. Great Britain: Simon Cottle, Alan Campbell, Peter Gardner and Peter Wells, 5:48.52 -> Final B

=== Semifinal B ===
1. Czech Republic: David Kopřiva, Tomáš Karas, Jakub Hanák and David Jirka, 5:42.73 -> Final A
2. Russia: Sergey Fedorovtsev, Igor Kravtsov, Aleksey Svirin and Nikolay Spinyov, 5:44.08 -> Final A
3. Belarus: Valery Radzevich, Stanislau Shcharbachenia, Pavel Shurmei and Andrei Pliashkou, 5:44.70 -> Final A
4. Estonia: Oleg Vinogradov, Igor Kuzmin, Andrei Šilin and Andrei Jämsä, 5:44.90 -> Final B
5. United States: Ben Holbrook, Brett Wilkinson, Sloan DuRoss and Kent Smack, 5:46.65 -> Final B
6. Switzerland: Simon Stürm, Christian Stofer, Olivier Gremaud and Florian Stofer, 5:48.74 -> Final B

== Finals ==
=== Final A - August 22 ===
1. Russia: Sergey Fedorovtsev, Igor Kravtsov, Aleksey Svirin and Nikolay Spinyov, 5:56.85
2. Czech Republic: David Kopřiva, Tomáš Karas, Jakub Hanák and David Jirka, 5:57.43
3. Ukraine: Sergij Grin, Serhiy Biloushchenko, Oleh Lykov and Leonid Shaposhnykov, 5:58.87
4. Poland: Adam Bronikowski, Marek Kolbowicz, Sławomir Kruszkowski and Adam Korol, 5:58.94
5. Germany: André Willms, Stefan Volkert, Marco Geisler and Robert Sens, 6:07.04
6. Belarus: Valery Radzevich, Stanislau Shcharbachenia, Pavel Shurmei and Andrei Pliashkou, 6:09.33

=== Final B - August 21 ===
1. Australia: Scott Brennan, David Crawshay, Duncan Free and Shaun Coulton, 6:02.31
2. Switzerland: Simon Stürm, Christian Stofer, Olivier Gremaud and Florian Stofer, 6:04.53
3. Estonia: Oleg Vinogradov, Igor Kuzmin, Andrei Šilin and Andrei Jämsä, 6:05.11
4. Italy: Alessandro Corona, Simone Venier, Federico Gattinoni and Simone Raineri, 6:06.91
5. United States: Ben Holbrook, Brett Wilkinson, Sloan DuRoss and Kent Smack, 6:07.83
6. Great Britain: Simon Cottle, Alan Campbell, Peter Gardner and Peter Wells, 6:07.87
