= Aleksey Svirin =

Russian rower

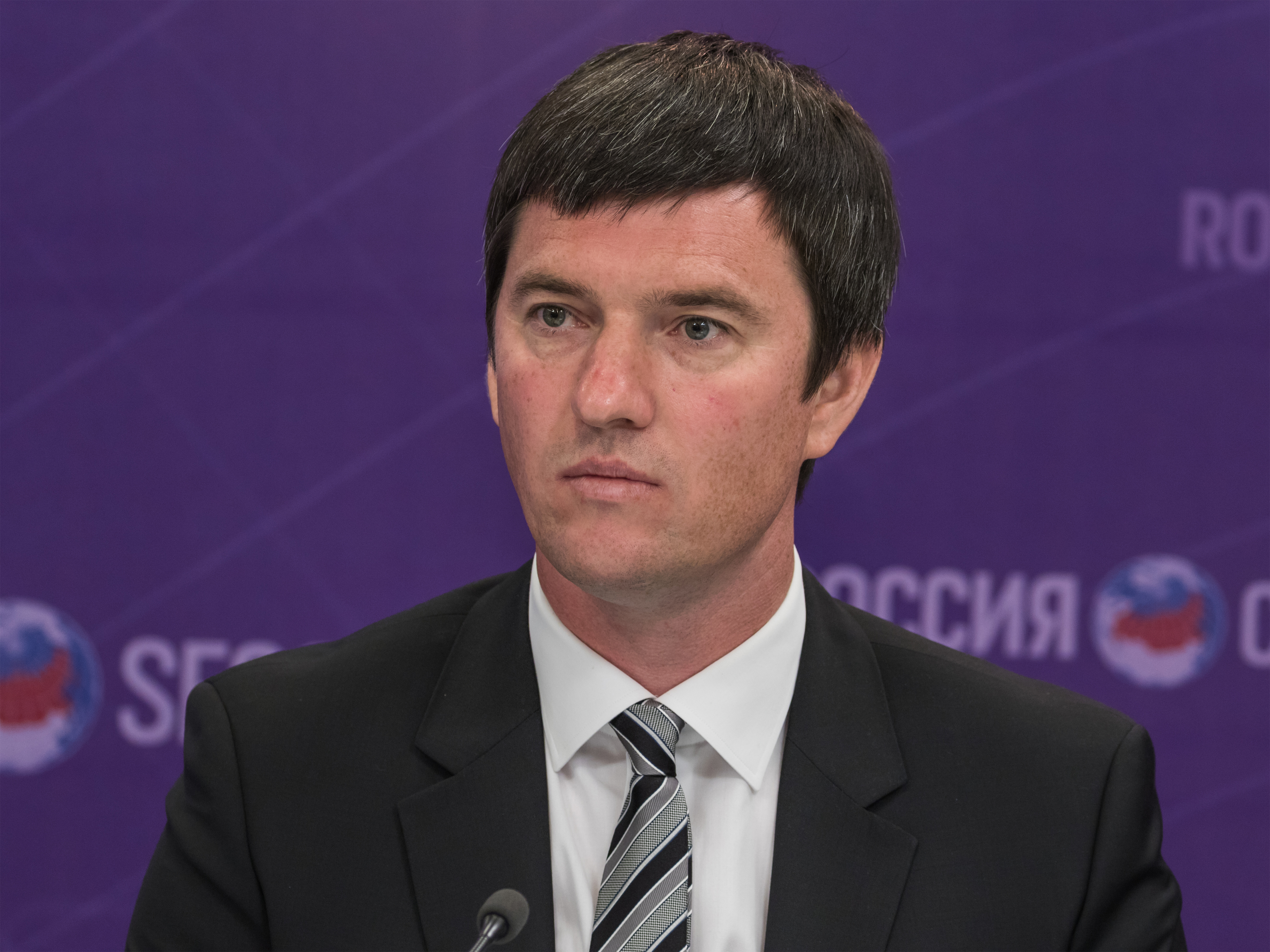
- Svirin in 2017

Personal information
- Born: 15 December 1978 (age 47) Moscow, Russian SFSR, Soviet Union

Sport
- Sport: Rowing
Medal record
Men's rowing
Representing Russia
Olympic Games
Gold medal – first place	2004 Athens	Quadruple sculls
European Championships
Gold medal – first place	2007 Poznań	Quadruple sculls
Gold medal – first place	2011 Plovdiv	Quadruple sculls

Aleksey Svirin (born 15 December 1978 in Moscow) is a Russian rower. He won a gold medal at the 2004 Summer Olympics in the men's quadruple sculls, with Igor Kravtsov, Sergey Fedorovtsev and Nikolay Spinyov. He also competed at the 2008 and 2012 Summer Olympics.

At European level, he is a two-time European champion, also in the quadruple sculls.
