= Stofer =

Stofer is a German surname. Notable people with the surname include:

- Christian Stofer (born 1976), Swiss rower
- Florian Stofer (born 1981), Swiss rower
- Jimmy Stofer (born 1983), American musician
