= Brett Wilkinson (rower) =

American rower (born 1976)

Personal information
- Born: May 2, 1976 (age 50) Hyde Park, New York, U.S.
- Height: 195.6 cm (6 ft 5 in)
- Weight: 86 kg (190 lb)

Sport
- Country: United States
- Sport: Rowing
- Event(s): Men's quadruple sculls; men's double sculls
- Club: Potomac Boat Club

Achievements and titles
- Olympic finals: 2004, M4x, 11th
- World finals: 2001, M4x, 2nd; 2002, M2x, 14th; 2003, M2x, 10th; 2004, M4x, 7th
- Updated on December 8, 2008

Brett Wilkinson (born May 2, 1976) is a former member of the U.S. National Rowing Team. Wilkinson began his rowing career at Franklin Delano Roosevelt High School and later rowed for Bucknell University. After college, he was a member of the Potomac Boat Club in Washington, D.C. where he qualified for the U.S. National Rowing Team.

He competed in the 2004 Summer Olympics in Athens in the men's quadruple sculls with teammates Ben Holbrook, Sloan DuRoss and Kent Smack, finishing 11th overall. Wilkinson also represented the United States in several World Championships, rowing in the men's double and quadruple sculls.

Wilkinson was a member of the team of engineers who worked to rebuild the Pentagon after the September 11 attacks.
