= Benguerel =

Benguerel is a surname. Notable people with the surname include:

- René Benguerel (born 1973), Swiss rower
- Sandra Locher Benguerel (born 1975), Swiss educator and politician
