= Flodin =

Flodin is a surname of Swedish origin. Notable people with the surname include:

- Christer Flodin (born 1948), Swedish television actor
- Hilda Flodin (1877–1958), Finnish artist
- Johan Flodin (born 1967), Swedish rower
- Louise Flodin (1828–1923), Swedish journalist, typographer, feminist and publisher
- May-Louise Flodin (1934–2011), Swedish model and beauty queen
- Patrik Flodin (born 1984), Swedish rally driver
- Ulrika Flodin (born 1975), Swedish middle- and long-distance runner
