= Belevich =

Belevich (Belarusian: Бялевіч, Russian: Белевич) is a surname of Slavic-language origin. Notable people with this surname include:

- Andrei Belevich (born 1997), Belarusian ice hockey player
- Aleksey Belevich (born 1995), Belarusian footballer
- Konstantin Belevich (born 1968), Belarusian rower
