= Serhiy Biloushchenko =

Ukrainian rower (born 1981)

Medal record

Men's rowing

Representing Ukraine

Olympic Games
Bronze medal – third place	2004 Athens	Quadruple sculls

World Rowing Championships
Silver medal – second place	2006 Eton	Quadruple sculls

European Championships
Bronze medal – third place	2008 Marathon	Quadruple sculls

Serhii Oleksandrovych Biloushchenko (Ukrainian: Сергій Олександрович Білоущенко; born 16 September 1981 in Chaplinka) is a Ukrainian rower. Serhiy Biloushchenko along with Serhiy Hryn, Oleh Lykov, and Leonid Shaposhnikov won the bronze medal in quadruple sculls for Ukraine in 2004, falling behind Russia (Gold) and the Czech Republic (Silver).
