= Ronald Snook =

Australian rower

Personal information
- Born: 5 May 1972 (age 54) Dalwallinu, Western Australia

Sport
- Country: Australia
- Sport: Rowing
- Club: Swan River Rowing Club; Curtin University Rowing Club

Achievements and titles
- Olympic finals: Quad scull Atlanta 1996
- National finals: King's Cup 1992–2000
Medal record
Men's rowing
Representing Australia
Olympic Games
Bronze medal – third place	1996 Atlanta	Quadruple sculls

Ronald Charles Snook (born 5 May 1972 in Dalwallinu, Western Australia) is an Australian former representative rower. He is an Olympic medallist and was a six-time Australian national champion. He won his Olympic bronze medal at Atlanta 1996 in the quad scull. He made seven state appearances for Western Australia in King's Cup eights between 1992 and 2000.

== Family ==
Snook is the second child of Ronald Arnott Snook of Cunderdin and Noreen Lesley Glasson of Kalgoorlie. He is the older brother of Emmy Snook who was also an Australian representative rower and who competed at the international level in the first half of Ron's elite rowing years. Snook attended Guildford Grammar School in Perth from 1985 to 1989.

== Club and state rowing ==
Snook's senior club rowing was firstly from the Swan River Rowing Club and from 1993 the Curtin University Rowing Club where he was coached by Tony Lovrich who ran a successful high performance sweep men's squad under the auspices of the Western Australian Institute of Sport.

Snook made his first representative appearance for West Australia in 1991 when selected in the WA youth eight to contest the Noel Wilkinson Trophy at the Interstate Regatta within the annual Australian Rowing Championships. That crew placed fourth. In 1992 he moved into the Western Australian men's senior eight to contest the King's Cup at the Interstate Regatta. They won the silver medal behind a stellar Victorian crew which included all four members of Australia's prominent crew of the time – the Oarsome Foursome. Snook made seven further King's Cup appearances for West Australia – 1993 (silver medal), 1994 (fourth place), 1995 (bronze medal), 1997 (fourth place), 1998 (silver medal), 1999 (gold medal), and 2000 (fifth place).

From 1991 to 1994 Snook contested U23 championship titles at the Australian Rowing Championships – initially in Swan River colours (1991–92) and thereafter racing in Curtin University strip. In 1992, 93 and 94 Snook was in West Australian composite crews which won the U23 men's eight national titles. In 1991 he took silver with Nick Porzig contesting the U23 men's pair title and in 1993 he won the Australian national U23 men's single scull title.

From 1995 Snook was rowing in the open division and focussed on sculling events. He raced in the men's open single scull to fourth places in 1995 and 1996.1996 Australian Championships at Australian Rowing History He contested the open men's double scull – silver in 1996, bronze in 1998 and silver in 1999. He raced in the open quad scull to silver in 1998 and 2000 and to a gold medal and the Australian championship title in 1999.

== International representative rowing ==
Ron Snook made two senior representative appearances for Australia. For the 1995 World Rowing Championships in Finland he was selected into the Australian quad scull with Duncan Free, Bo Hanson and Victoria's Jason Day. They won their heat but placed fourth in their semi which put them into the B final and an overall 8th-placed finish.

For the 1996 Atlanta Olympics the coach position was given to Tim McLaren and there was one crew change from 1995 – Day swapped out for Janusz Hooker. In Atlanta the quad won their heat, placed 2nd in the semi-final and in the final took the bronze behind Germany and the USA. It was Snook's last Australian representative appearance.
