= Gremaud =

Gremaud is a surname. Notable people with the surname include:

- Mathilde Gremaud (born 2000), Swiss freestyle skier
- Olivier Gremaud (born 1979), Swiss rower
