= Lenoble =

Lenoble, LeNoble, or Le Noble may refer to:

== People ==
- Alexandre Lenoble (1840/1–1879), victim of French murderer Victor Prévost
- Bernard Lenoble (1902–1997), French footballer
- Eustache Le Noble (1643–1711), French playwright and writer
- Martyn LeNoble (born 1969), Dutch bassist
- Penny le Noble (born 1972), Dutch softball player

== Places ==
- Toussus-le-Noble, commune in the Yvelines department
  - Toussus-le-Noble Airport
- Sin-le-Noble, commune in the Nord department in northern France
- Ciry-le-Noble, commune in the Saône-et-Loire department
- Gisy-les-Nobles, commune in the Yonne department
- Givenchy-le-Noble, commune in the Pas-de-Calais department
- Saint-Romain-le-Noble, commune in the Lot-et-Garonne department
