= Reijnen =

Reijnen is a Dutch surname. Notable people with the surname include:

- Etiënne Reijnen (born 1987), Dutch footballer
- Gonny Reijnen (born 1967), Dutch softball player
- Jan Reijnen (1927 – 2020), Dutch politician
- Kiel Reijnen (born 1986), American cyclist
