= Leslie Joseph Hooker =

Australian property entrepreneur, businessman and philanthropist

Sir Leslie Joseph Hooker
- Hooker in 1963
- Born: Leslie Joseph Tingyou; 18 August 1903; Canterbury, New South Wales, Australia
- Died: 29 April 1976 (aged 72); Darlinghurst, New South Wales, Australia
- Occupation: Businessperson
- Spouse: Madeline Adella Price (m. 1934)
- Children: 3

Sir Leslie Joseph Hooker (born Leslie Joseph Tingyou; 18 August 1903 – 29 April 1976) was an Australian property entrepreneur, businessman and philanthropist. From humble beginnings he created the LJ Hooker empire and was at one time Australia's largest landholder and the world's largest cattle owner. He was knighted in 1973 for services to commerce.

== Early life ==
Hooker was born in Canterbury, Sydney, New South Wales. His mother, Ellen ("Nellie") Tingyou, was 18 and unmarried when she gave birth to him. They lived with their extended family, which included his grandfather, the Chinese-born James Tingyou. Nellie died at age 25 of tuberculosis, leaving Leslie an orphan at just 8 years of age. He was raised by his extended family and attended public schools in Canterbury and Beecroft. He began working at 13 years of age, initially with a Japanese import and export company and later as a ship's purser.

== Hooker the surname ==
Leslie changed his surname from Tingyou to Hooker in February 1925. He did so to circumvent the White Australia Policy and to be more acceptable to Australians with whom he hoped to do business. The mostly likely reason he selected "Hooker" was because it was an Anglicised version of his step father's name Hookin. Hooker's Chinese heritage remained a secret until some years after his death.

== Business ==
By the age of 16, Hooker had purchased two blocks of land in Blacktown. In the mid-1920s he opened his first real estate business in Martin Place in Sydney but it failed. In 1928 he tried again and opened L J Hooker Real Estate in Maroubra using the iconic red and yellow signage. From this beginning LJ Hooker greatly expanded and by 1953 the agency was the largest real estate agency in Australia. In 1963 Hooker House with all the various Hooker enterprises opened in Sydney. Through various companies Hooker's interests expanded to include property investment, new home development, projects, takeovers, finance, trusts, pastoral activities and franchising. He also had interests outside Australia such as in the United States. Sir Arthur Fadden and Sir Neil O'Sullivan were directors of some of his companies. With a vision and persistence Hooker survived bankruptcy, the Great Depression, World War II and the 1960s credit squeeze to build an empire. When Hooker retired from the company in 1974, the Hooker Group had more than 2300 staff and assets of almost $200 million.

== Family life ==
On 23 June 1934, Hooker married Madeline Adella Price. They had three children: Annette Price Hooker, Leslie Ross Hooker, and David Price Hooker. David married Urszula Tomaszewska, and they had two children, Leslie Janusz Hooker and Natalia Hooker. Janusz is Chairman of LJ Hooker, and Natalia wrote a biography of her grandfather, LJ Hooker The Man in 2011.

== Philanthropy ==
Hooker was a director and life governor of the Royal New South Wales Institute for Deaf and Blind Children. He was heavily involved in the development of CIDE, now the Shepherd Centre, which assists deaf children. He was on the board of the Sydney Hospital, was Chairman of the Sydney Eye and Ear Hospital Management Committee, and chairman of the first appeal fund for the Foundation for the Research and Treatment of Alcoholism. He was on a committee to raise funds for the Olympic games of 1960, 1964, 1968 and 1972 and a committee to raise funds for the Salvation Army Red Shield Appeal. He also supported churches.

== Death ==
He died on 29 April 1976 at St Vincent's Hospital, Darlinghurst, Sydney, New South Wales aged 72.
