= Oleg Solomakhin =

Belarusian rower

Personal information
- Nationality: Belarusian
- Born: 15 December 1971 (age 53); Gomel, Belarus

Sport
- Sport: Rowing

Oleg Solomakhin (born 15 December 1971) is a Belarusian rower. He competed in the men's quadruple sculls event at the 1996 Summer Olympics.
