= Kent Smack =

American rower

Personal information
- Full name: Kent David Smack
- Nationality: American
- Born: March 1, 1975 (age 51) Flemington, New Jersey, U.S.
- Height: 195 cm (6 ft 5 in)
- Weight: 90 kg (200 lb)

Sport
- Country: United States
- Sport: Rowing
- Event(s): Men's quadruple sculls; men's double sculls
- Club: Riverside Boat Club; Princeton Training Centre

Achievements and titles
- Olympic finals: 2004, M4x, 11th
- World finals: 2001, M2x, 13th

Kent Smack is a former two-time member of the U.S. National Rowing Team, ultimately he is earning his spot to compete for Team USA at the 2004 Athens Olympics. Kent now serves as a Managing Director and President of ESM Software Group.

== Rowing career ==
Kent began his rowing career at Hobart and William Smith Colleges as a novice; joining the team only after learning that he would sit on the bench for Hobart's lacrosse team. Kent went on to serve as the crew captain, leading the Hobart Statesmen to the 1996 New York State Championship. Hobart was early to recognize Kent's potential as a rower. Following Kent's graduation, Hobart Rowing began the Kent D. Smack award, recognizing the oarsman who demonstrates the most improvement over his career.

After finishing up his college career, Kent continued his education to earn his master's degree in communications and information systems at Rutgers University in 1999. However, Kent never stopped rowing. In 1999, Kent decidedly won the US men's club singles event, beating his future Olympic teammate, Brett Wilkinson (rower). Kent then moved onto earned his place on Team U.S.A's rowing team in 2001. He competed in the 2001 World Rowing Championships in Lucerne, finishing 13th overall in the world. He later competed in the 2004 Summer Olympics in Athens in the men's quadruple sculls, earning a second-place finish in the Olympic Qualification Regatta, and 11th at the Olympic Games.

== Balanced Scorecard ==
During his time training as an oarsman, Kent ventured out to develop his professional career. Working with Robert S. Kaplan and David P. Norton, co-founders of ESM Software Group, Kent trained and consulted on the Balanced Scorecard methodology for over a decade, publishing multiple articles through the Harvard Business Review. Specializing in SaaS product development and earning an expert certification in business improvement consulting, Kent now supports development of software for Balanced Scorecard reporting in conjunction with strategic management. He is cited as is an innovator of strategy management software that maximizes the value of cloud computing applications to end users. Kent serves as managing director and President of ESM Software Group.

== Publications ==
- Kaplan, Robert S., et al. Balanced Scorecard Report Volume 5, Number 4. Harvard Business Review, July 2003.
- Kaplan, Robert S., et al. Balanced Scorecard Report Volume 4, Number 6. Harvard Business Review, Nov. 2002.
- Palazzolo, Christopher and Kent D. Smack. "Four Steps to BSC Software Selection." Harvard Business Review, Nov. 2002.
- Smack, Kent D. "How-to's of BSC Reporting Part 1." Harvard Business Review, July. 2003.
- Smack, Kent D. "How-to's of BSC Reporting Part II - The Reporting Meeting." Harvard Business Review, Nov. 2003."
