= Sergey Tarasevich =

Belarusian rower

Personal information
- Nationality: Belarusian
- Born: 18 February 1973 (age 52); Svietlahorsk, Belarus

Sport
- Sport: Rowing

Sergey Tarasevich (born 18 February 1973) is a Belarusian rower. He competed in the men's quadruple sculls event at the 1996 Summer Olympics.
