= Henrik Nilsson (rower) =

Swedish rower (born 1969)

Personal information
- Nationality: Swedish
- Born: 1 March 1969 (age 56) Kristianstad, Sweden

Sport
- Sport: Rowing

Henrik Nilsson (born 1 March 1969) is a Swedish rower. He competed in the men's quadruple sculls event at the 1996 Summer Olympics.
