= LJ Hooker =

Australian real estate company

- Formerly: L. J. Hooker Investment Corporation; Hooker Corporation
- Type: Proprietary
- Industry: Real estate
- Founded: 1928; 98 years ago
- Founder: Leslie Joseph Hooker
- Headquarters: Sydney, Australia
- Number of locations: 730 (2018)
- Area served: Australia, New Zealand, Indonesia, Papua New Guinea, Vanuatu, China and Hong Kong
- Key people: Janusz Hooker (chairman)
- Products: Real estate franchising real estate
- Services: Real estate; Property management; Property sales; Auction; Home loans and finance; Conveyancing and settlements; Project development; Project marketing
- Owner: Each LJ Hooker office is independently owned and managed by its franchisees.
- Number of employees: 8,000 (2018)

LJ Hooker is one of Australia's largest real estate groups, with 600 franchise offices and 6,000 people engaged in residential and commercial property sales and property management. The company was founded in 1928 by Sir Leslie Joseph Hooker and after being sold to a private company for 20 years, the company returned to family hands in 2009.

== History ==
The first LJ Hooker office was opened in Maroubra, New South Wales in 1928. Following the Depression, the company expanded and opened offices in Sydney, Kensington, Kingsford and Randwick. In 1936, LJ Hooker purchased the real estate business and offices of Woods & Co. in Kensington and Kingsford. In 1938, Rex Investments is registered and purchased real-estate agencies and hotels around Australia. The following year, LJ Hooker established its headquarters in Pitt Street, Sydney by buying H. L. Cross & Co., a city agency.

In 1946, LJ Hooker bought the real estate business of Harold Bray Pty Ltd in Bondi Beach. In 1947, the company was floated on the Sydney Stock Exchange. The following year, LJ Hooker purchased F. Egan & Son, a real estate agency in Bondi Junction. In 1949, the company expanded into hotel brokerage.

In 1950, the tenth office was opened in Crows Nest and in 1951 the Manly office was opened after the purchase of Thorn Coleman & Co. LJ Hooker's expansion continued, and by 1953 the agency was the largest real estate agency in Australia. In 1955 Hooker Rex was established for the development of new homes in Batemans Bay, Kogarah and the Gold Coast through Hooker Rex Pty Ltd. In 1958, the company's name was changed to L. J. Hooker Investment Corporation Ltd. In 1959, the Hooker Finance company was established.

In 1960, LJ Hooker became Australia's first national real estate agency network. The following year, Hooker Projects began developing nursing homes, motels and other projects. In 1963, Hooker House was opened in Sydney. Hooker Project offices were opened in Melbourne in 1966, Brisbane in 1967, Perth in 1968, and Townsville and Canberra in 1969.

In 1968, the company's name changed to Hooker Corporation Ltd. In 1969, Hooker Home Units was established, which specialised in building home units and town houses.

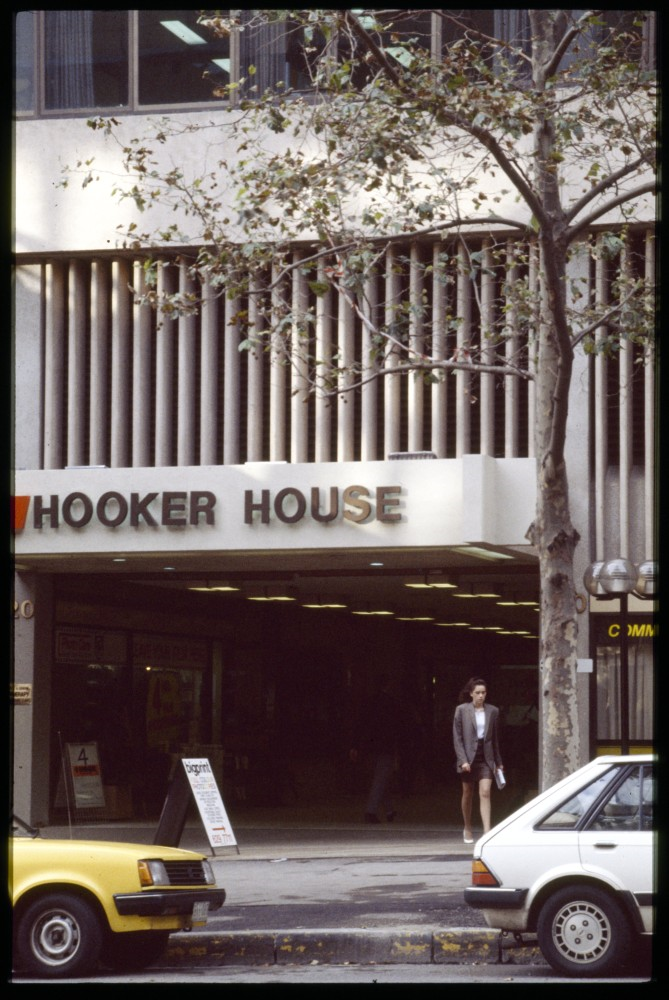
Hooker House, Melbourne

Leslie Joseph Hooker died in 1976. In 1985, George Herscu bought the Hooker Group for $450 million. In 1989, LJ Hooker owed $1.77 billion, and was purchased by Suncorp Metway.

In 2009, Janusz Hooker, Leslie Hooker's grandson, formed a consortium with other buyers and bought the company back from Suncorp-Metway for $67 million. In 2015, Janusz Hooker and other shareholders bought out the minority shareholders to consolidate ownership of the company.

== International expansion ==
In the mid-1980s, while led briefly by CEO George Herscu, LJ Hooker crossed into development and acquisition of retailers and large scale shopping complexes in the United States. During this period LJ Hooker also acquired Merrill Lynch Commercial Real Estate in an effort to infuse seasoned Commercial Real estate expertise into its retail development arm. Robert Rodriguez (Sr. VP) and Dennis Mulligan (VP) led the retail real estate group for Merrill Lynch Commercial Real estate. This move proved ill-conceived, with such ventures as the purchase and operation of several storied American department store chains as B. Altman & Co., Bonwit Teller, Sakowitz and Parisian stores, to be used as anchors for a number of large shopping malls in the United States. Having no track record in understanding the complex operations required to run retail department stores, this venture proved deeply flawed and plunged LJ Hooker, the department stores and its various development holdings into bankruptcy.

Most of the department store chains were liquidated with large economic and employment losses. The one mall complex that was constructed during Herscu's tenure, the Forest Fair Mall in suburban Cincinnati, Ohio, went through numerous changes in ownership and operations. Today the ill-fated mall is still struggling, having gone through three name changes. This period, although brief in its history, was deeply tumultuous and troubling and led to LJ Hooker Limited being purchased by the Queensland based Suncorp-Metway, in January 1989.

LJ Hooker was liquidated in the late 1980s, but the name continued through the franchise arrangement that continues. In 1997, it opened offices in Hong Kong and Papua New Guinea.

=== Acquisitions ===
In 1996, LJ Hooker purchased the Challenge Realty Group in New Zealand and in 1998 they rebranded it as LJ Hooker. In 2003, LJ Hooker purchased the real estate franchise group Olsen & Everson. In 2002, LJ Hooker opened its first offices in Indonesia, and in 2004, LJ Hooker opened offices in Mumbai, India, and Shanghai.

In October 2004, Grahame Cooke stepped down as CEO and was replaced by Warren McCarthy.

In October 2009, Suncorp confirmed it sold its LJ Hooker real estate chain business to Janusz Hooker, the grandson of founder Sir Leslie Hooker, for $67 million. In July 2015, he also bought out the investors to take full control of the group.

In November 2010, LJ Hooker acquired Harveys Real Estate Group in New Zealand.

== Organisation ==
Hooker Corporation Limited is the holding company, and LJ Hooker Limited is the trading entity. Hooker Corporation Limited's ACN is 003 890 444 and the ACN of L.J. Hooker Limited is 003 890 4553. LJ Hooker is a franchise operation. The real estate side of the business is done by franchise owners. Grant Harrod was appointed chief executive officer and managing director in 2014. The company chairman is Janusz Hooker.

=== Subsidiaries ===
LJ Hooker has also established an independent incorporated legal practice trading as LJ Hooker Conveyancing NSW, which is a division of Guardian Conveyancers Pty Ltd (ACN 136 790 022). The business is independently owned and operated under licence from LJ Hooker Limited. LJ Hooker Conveyancing is located in Sydney. In Western Australia it uses LJ Hooker Settlements to do their conveyancing.

=== Logos ===
1937

1948

1953

1959

1969

1993

2015 (a similar logo was used in the 2000s)
