= Jarosław Nowicki (rower) =

Polish rower

Personal information
- Nationality: Polish
- Born: 2 May 1970 (age 56) Bydgoszcz, Poland

Sport
- Sport: Rowing
Medal record
Representing Poland
Summer Universiade
Bronze medal – third place	1993 Buffalo	Quadruple sculls

Jarosław Sebastian Nowicki (born 2 May 1970) is a Polish rower. He competed in the men's quadruple sculls event at the 1996 Summer Olympics.
