= Brian Jamieson (rower) =

American rower

Personal information
- Full name: Brian G. Jamieson
- Born: March 7, 1969 (age 57) Livingston, New Jersey, U.S.
- Height: 6 ft 4 in (193 cm)
- Weight: 209 lb (95 kg)
Medal record
Men's rowing
Representing United States
Olympic Games
Silver medal – second place	1996 Atlanta	Quadruple sculls
Pan American Games
Silver medal – second place	1995 Mar del Plata	Quadruple sculls

Brian G. Jamieson (born March 7, 1969) is an American rower.
