= Georgy Nikitin =

Russian rower

Personal information
- Nationality: Russian
- Born: 26 April 1973 (age 51)

Sport
- Sport: Rowing

Georgy Nikitin (born 26 April 1973) is a Russian rower. He competed in the men's quadruple sculls event at the 1996 Summer Olympics.
