= Tim Young (American rower) =

American rower (born 1969)

Personal information
- Full name: Timothy Paul Young
- Born: April 9, 1969 (age 57) Moorestown, New Jersey, U.S.
- Height: 6 ft 4 in (193 cm)
- Weight: 207 lb (94 kg)
Medal record
Men's rowing
Representing United States
Olympic Games
Silver medal – second place	1996 Atlanta	Quadruple sculls
Pan American Games
Silver medal – second place	1995 Mar del Plata	Quadruple sculls

Timothy Paul Young (born April 9, 1969 in Moorestown, New Jersey) is an American rower.
