= Giovanni Valentina =

Brazilian rower

Personal information
- Born: 30 June 1975 (age 49); Porto Alegre, Brazil

Sport
- Sport: Rowing

Giovanni Valentina (born 30 June 1975) is a Brazilian rower. He competed in the men's quadruple sculls event at the 1996 Summer Olympics.
