= Federico Gattinoni =

Italian rower

Personal information
- Nationality: Italian
- Born: 20 June 1984 (age 40); Lecco, Italy

Sport
- Sport: Rowing

Federico Gattinoni (born 20 June 1984) is an Italian rower. He competed in the men's quadruple sculls event at the 2004 Summer Olympics.
