= Andrey Pleshkov =

Belarusian rower

Personal information
- Nationality: Belarusian
- Born: 12 March 1982 (age 44) Polotsk, Belarus

Sport
- Sport: Rowing

Andrey Pleshkov (born 12 March 1982) is a Belarusian rower. He competed in the men's quadruple sculls event at the 2004 Summer Olympics.
