= Jason Gailes =

American rower

Personal information
- Born: March 28, 1970 (age 56) Dighton, Massachusetts, U.S.
Medal record
Men's rowing
Representing United States
Olympic Games
Silver medal – second place	1996 Atlanta	Quadruple sculls

Jason B. Gailes (born March 28, 1970) is an American rower. He was born in Dighton, Massachusetts.
