= Danika Holbrook-Harris =

American rower (born 1972)

Danika Harris
Personal information
- Born: September 15, 1972 (age 53) Durham, New Hampshire, U.S.
- Spouse: Ben Holbrook

Sport
- Country: United States
- Sport: Rowing

Achievements and titles
- Olympic finals: 2004 Women's 4x - 5th Place
Medal record
Women's rowing
Representing United States
World Rowing Championships
Gold medal – first place	1994 Indianapolis	LW4-
Bronze medal – third place	1993 Račice	LW4-

Danika Holbrook-Harris (born September 15, 1972) is an American competitive rower. She competed at the 2004 Summer Olympics in Athens, in the women's quadruple sculls. She was born in Durham, New Hampshire.

She won a bronze medal at the 1993 World Rowing Championships, and a gold medal at the 1994 World Rowing Championships.

Her husband Ben Holbrook is also an Olympic rower.
