= Denis Tabako =

Belarusian rower

Personal information
- Nationality: Belarusian
- Born: 20 February 1974 (age 51); Minsk, Belarus

Sport
- Sport: Rowing

Denis Tabako (born 20 February 1974) is a Belarusian rower. He competed in the men's quadruple sculls event at the 1996 Summer Olympics.
