= Pie Geelen =

Dutch swimmer (born 1972)

Personal information
- Full name: Pieke Geelen
- Nickname: "Pie"
- Born: October 20, 1972 (age 53) Nijmegen, Netherlands

Sport
- Sport: Swimming

Pieke Geelen (born 20 October 1972) is a former freestyle swimmer from the Netherlands, who competed for his native country at the 1996 Summer Olympics in Atlanta. There he finished in fifth position with the Men's Relay Team in the 4x100m Freestyle, alongside Mark Veens, Martin van der Spoel, and Pieter van den Hoogenband.
