= Przemysław Lewandowski =

Polish rower

Personal information
- Nationality: Polish
- Born: 21 July 1975 (age 49); Poznań, Poland

Sport
- Sport: Rowing

Przemysław Lewandowski (born 21 July 1975) is a Polish rower. He competed in the men's quadruple sculls event at the 1996 Summer Olympics.
