= Eric Mueller =

American rower (born 1970)

Personal information
- Born: November 6, 1970 (age 55) Kansas City, Missouri, U.S.
Medal record
Men's rowing
Representing the United States
Olympic Games
Silver medal – second place	1996 Atlanta	Quadruple sculls

Eric C. Mueller (born November 6, 1970) is a former Olympic and National team rower, representing the United States at the 1996 and 2000 Olympics.

He was born in Kansas City, Missouri.

Mueller, one of the most successful men's rowers in Wisconsin history, begins his third season as the Badgers' freshmen coach.

Mueller returns to Madison for the second time as an assistant coach. He spent 1998–99 as the assistant varsity coach, before leaving to train for the 2000 Olympic Summer Games in Sydney, Australia. During his previous stint, he was responsible for the Badgers' small boats and led them to four gold medals and one silver medal at the Intercollegiate Rowing Association national championships. The result helped Wisconsin begin a four-year run as winners of the Ten Eyck Trophy as national team points champion.

Since his return, the UW freshmen have improved from a bottom six national finish in the year before his joining the program to a return to the national grand finals.

As a rower, Mueller secured three letters at Wisconsin while a member of the varsity eight from 1991 to 1993. At national championships during his career, the boat placed sixth, once, and ninth, twice. A Cedarburg, native, Mueller earned a bachelor's degree in mechanical engineering from Wisconsin in 1994.

Following his Badger career, Mueller went on to win an Olympic silver medal in the men's quadruple sculls in 1996 in Atlanta. He also placed fifth at the 2000 Olympics with the men's four. U.S. national team member in 1995, ‘96, ‘00, ‘01 and ‘02, he was part of the men's eight champion at the 2002 World Cup in Lucerne, Switzerland, and finished third at the 2002 World Championships in Seville, Spain. His men's four took fourth at the 2001 World Championships, while his men's eight was a bronze medalist at the 2000 World Cup, again in Lucerne. He also won a bronze medal with the men's quadruple sculls in Lucerne at the 1996 World Cup.
