= Massimo Paradiso =

Italian rower

Medal record

Men's rowing

Representing Italy

World Championships
Gold medal – first place	1994 Indianapolis	M4x
Gold medal – first place	1995 Tampere	M4x
Silver medal – second place	1991 Vienna	M4x
Bronze medal – third place	1990 Tasmania	M4x
Bronze medal – third place	1993 Račice	M4x

Massimo Paradiso (born 19 October 1968 in Vico Equense) is an Italian rower. He finished 4th in the quadruple sculls at the 1996 Summer Olympics.
