= André Costa (rower) =

Brazilian rower

Personal information
- Full name: André Vorraber Costa
- Born: 21 August 1976 (age 48); Porto Alegre, Brazil

Sport
- Sport: Rowing

André Vorraber Costa (born 21 August 1976) is a Brazilian rower. He competed in the men's quadruple sculls event at the 1996 Summer Olympics.
