= Shaun Coulton =

Australian rower

Personal information
- Nationality: Australian
- Born: 20 August 1979 (age 45); Sydney, Australia

Sport
- Sport: Rowing

Shaun Coulton (born 20 August 1979) is an Australian rower. He competed in the men's quadruple sculls event at the 2004 Summer Olympics.
