= Vincent Lepvraud =

French rower

Personal information
- Nationality: French
- Born: 28 July 1970 (age 54); Niort, France

Sport
- Sport: Rowing

Vincent Lepvraud (born 28 July 1970) is a French rower. He competed in the men's quadruple sculls event at the 1996 Summer Olympics.
