= Xavier Philippe =

French rower (born 1980)

Personal information
- Nationality: French
- Born: 22 November 1980 (age 45) Amiens, France

Sport
- Sport: Rowing

Xavier Philippe (born 22 November 1980) is a French rower. He competed in the men's quadruple sculls event at the 2004 Summer Olympics.
