= Peter Gardner (rower) =

British rower

Personal information
- Nationality: British
- Born: 21 September 1974 (age 50); Banbury, England

Sport
- Sport: Rowing

Peter Gardner (born 21 September 1974) is a British rower. He competed in the men's quadruple sculls event at the 2004 Summer Olympics.
