= Oleg Vinogradov (rower) =

Estonian rower

Personal information
- Nationality: Estonian
- Born: 28 April 1984 (age 42) Pärnu, then part of Estonian SSR, Soviet Union

Sport
- Sport: Rowing

Oleg Vinogradov (born 28 April 1984) is an Estonian rower. He competed in the men's quadruple sculls event at the 2004 Summer Olympics.
