= Frédéric Perrier =

French rower

Personal information
- Nationality: French
- Born: 30 November 1974 (age 50); Mâcon, France

Sport
- Sport: Rowing

Frédéric Perrier (born 30 November 1974) is a French rower. He competed in the men's quadruple sculls event at the 2004 Summer Olympics.
