= Pontus Ek =

Swedish rower

Personal information
- Nationality: Swedish
- Born: 27 June 1975 (age 49); Halmstad, Sweden

Sport
- Sport: Rowing

Pontus Ek (born 27 June 1975) is a Swedish former rower. He competed in the men's quadruple sculls event at the 1996 Summer Olympics.
