= Carlos Pages =

Argentine rower

Personal information
- Nationality: Argentine
- Born: 13 November 1978 (age 46)

Sport
- Sport: Rowing

Carlos Pages (born 13 November 1978) is an Argentine rower. He competed in the men's quadruple sculls event at the 1996 Summer Olympics.
