= Tomáš Karas =

Czech rower (born 1975)

Medal record

Men's Rowing

Representing Czech Republic

Olympic Games
Silver medal – second place	2004 Athens	Quadruple sculls

Tomáš Karas (born 16 May 1975 in Prague) is a Czech rower.
