= René Benguerel =

Swiss rower

Personal information
- Nationality: Swiss
- Born: 11 May 1973 (age 51)

Sport
- Sport: Rowing

René Benguerel (born 11 May 1973) is a Swiss rower. He competed in the men's quadruple sculls event at the 1996 Summer Olympics where he ranked 5th.
