= David Kopřiva =

Czech rower

Personal information
- Born: 18 October 1979 (age 46) Prague, Czechoslovakia
Medal record
Men's rowing
Representing Czech Republic
Olympic Games
Silver medal – second place	2004 Athens	Quadruple sculls
World Rowing Championships
Silver medal – second place	2003 Milan	Quadruple sculls

David Kopřiva (born 18 October 1979, in Prague) is a Czech rower.
