= Petra Beek =

Dutch softball player (born 1973)

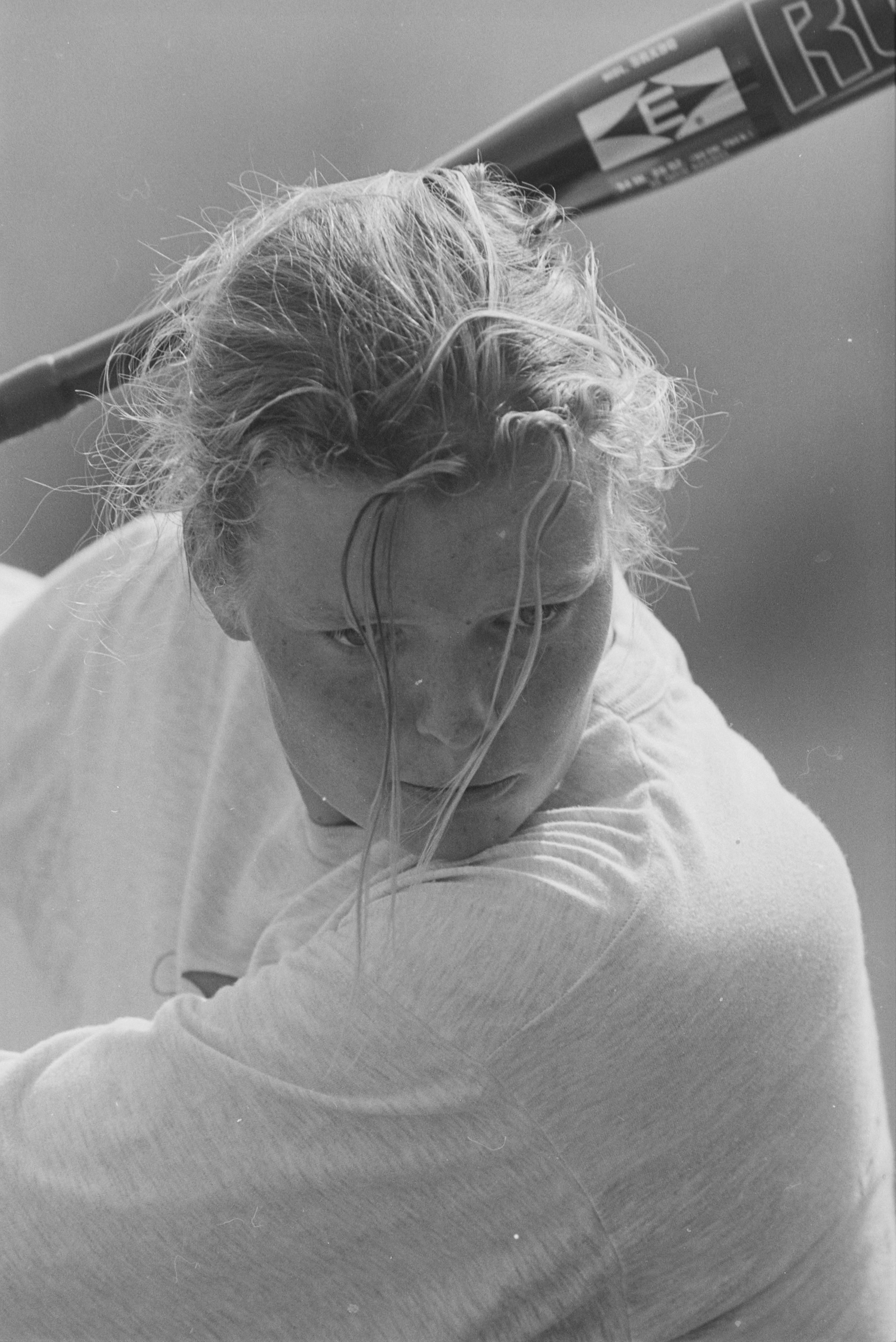
- Beek (1995)

Personal information
- Full name: Petra Danielle Beek
- Nationality: Dutch
- Born: 1 June 1973 (age 51); Bussum, Netherlands

Sport
- Sport: Softball
- Position: catcher
- Club: HCAW

Petra Danielle Beek (born 1 June 1973) is a Dutch former softball player. She played as a catcher for the Netherlands women's national softball team and HCAW.

She won with HCAW won the European Cup in 1994. She competed in the women's tournament at the 1996 Summer Olympics. She also competed in World Championships, including at the 1994 championships.

Her sister Madelon Beek was also a member of the national team at the Olympics, and played also with her sister with HCAW.

Beek is in relationship with her previous national team member Marlies van der Putten. They live in Velserbroek and have a son and a daughter.
