= Sloan DuRoss =

American rower

Personal information
- Born: October 23, 1976 (age 49) Hanover, New Hampshire, U.S.

Sport
- Country: United States
- Sport: Rowing
Medal record
Representing United States
Pan American Games
Bronze medal – third place	2003 Santo Domingo	Double sculls

Sloan DuRoss (born October 23, 1976) is an American rower. He competed at the 2004 Summer Olympics in Athens, in the men's quadruple sculls. DuRoss was born in Hanover, New Hampshire.
