= Martine Stiemer =

Dutch softball player (born 1973)

Personal information
- Full name: Martine Denise Stiemer
- Nationality: Dutch
- Born: 4 May 1973 (age 52); Veenendaal, Netherlands

Sport
- Sport: Softball
- Position: outfielder
- Club: HCAW

Martine Denise Stiemer (born 4 May 1973) is a Dutch former softball player. She played as an outfielder for the Netherlands women's national softball team and HCAW. She competed in the women's tournament at the 1996 Summer Olympics.
