= Sandra Nieuwveen =

Dutch softball player (born 1969)

Personal information
- Nationality: Dutch
- Born: 28 July 1969 (age 55); Alkmaar, Netherlands

Sport
- Sport: Softball

Sandra Nieuwveen (born 28 July 1969) is a Dutch softball player. She competed in the women's tournament at the 1996 Summer Olympics.
