= Janusz Hooker =

Australian businessman and rower

L. Janusz Hooker
Personal information
- Born: Leslie Janusz Hooker; 28 September 1969 (age 57) Sydney, Australia
- Occupations: Chairman, LJ Hooker Limited
- Website: www.ljhooker.com
Medal record
Men's rowing
Representing Australia
Olympic Games
Bronze medal – third place	1996 Atlanta	Quadruple sculls
Commonwealth Rowing Championships
Silver medal – second place	1994 Ontario	M4-
Junior World Rowing Championships
Silver medal – second place	1987 Cologne	JM1X

Leslie Janusz Hooker (born 28 September 1969) is an Australian businessman and former Australian national champion and representative rower who won a bronze medal at the 1996 Atlanta Olympic Games.

== Family background and education ==
Hooker's grandfather Leslie Joseph Hooker ("LJ") was born in Canterbury, Sydney and was of Chinese heritage. He started a real estate business in Maroubra, New South Wales in 1928 which by his retirement in 1974, had grown into the LJ Hooker national real estate network with more than 2300 staff and assets of almost $200 million. LJ's second son David married Urszula Tomaszewska and they had two children Leslie Janusz and Natalia Hooker.

Janusz Hooker was educated in Sydney at SCECGS Redlands. He studied at the University of Pennsylvania where he was a member of the St. Anthony Hall fraternity. He has a Bachelor of Science in Economics from the Wharton School of Business, with a concentration in finance.

== Club and state rowing ==
While at school Hooker rowed for the Mosman Rowing Club and was coached by Bruce Evans. At the 1986 Australian Rowing Championships he contested and placed third in the national schoolboy single sculls title. In 1987 he won the national U19 single sculls title in Mosman colours at the Australian Championships and placed second in the schoolboy scull racing for Redlands. In 1987 he was Australia's junior sculler selected for the Trans-Tasman match series against New Zealand. Hooker won all of his match races.

In 1988 he first made state selection for New South Wales as stroke of the youth eight which won the Noel Wilkinson Trophy at the Interstate Regatta within the Australian Rowing Championships. As a composite Mosman/Sydney crew that same eight contested national title for a men's U23 eight at those championships.

Whilst conducting his tertiary studies at Penn in the USA he rowed for the University of Pennsylvania. Following his return to Australia Hooker made the 1995 New South Wales men's eight contesting the King's Cup at the Interstate Regatta. In 1996 he contested the open single sculls title at the national championships.

== International representative rowing ==
Hooker made his Australian representative debut as an eighteen year old single sculler at the 1987 World Rowing U23 Championships in Aigubelette where he rowed to overall eighth place. That same year he was Australia's single scull entrant at the Junior World Rowing Championships in Cologne where he won the bronze medal.

He made the Australian senior representative squad after his study years in the US and was selected in 1994 in the coxless four which raced at the World Championships in Indianapolis to an eleventh placing. The following year at the 1995 World Rowing Championships in Tampere, Hooker rowed the Australian single scull and was well off the pace in his sixteenth-place finish.

1996 saw Hooker achieve senior representative success when he was selected in the Australian quad scull for the 1996 Atlanta Olympics. The crew was composed of diverse rowers from four states and was coached by Tim McLaren who also had responsibility for Australia's lightweight double scull. Both those sculling crews made their Olympic finals and placed third. Hooker brought home a bronze Olympic medal to mark the end of his elite rowing career.

== Business career ==
Hooker is the Chairman and was formerly Chief Executive Officer, of LJ Hooker Limited, a company founded by his grandfather Sir Leslie Joseph Hooker. He led a group of investors who acquired the LJ Hooker business from Suncorp in 2009.

Hooker's career has included being the managing director of Asia for W.P. Carey & Co., a New York-based investment management company. Previously he was the founder and CEO of TiNSHED, an Asia-Pacific investment firm. In his early career he was investment officer at the Asian Infrastructure Fund in Hong Kong and a business analyst on the China desk at Price Waterhouse.

He is passionate about youth education, co-founding the Foundation for Kids in New York and the Kids to Coast Program for the Mutitjulu Community in Central Australia.
