= Valery Rodevich =

Belarusian rower

Personal information
- Nationality: Belarusian
- Born: 26 April 1980 (age 45); Mogilev, Byelorussian SSR, Soviet Union

Sport
- Sport: Rowing

Valery Rodevich (born 26 April 1980) is a Belarusian rower. He competed at the 2004 Summer Olympics and the 2008 Summer Olympics.
