= Michael Erdlen =

Swiss rower

Personal information
- Nationality: Swiss
- Born: 7 July 1970 (age 54); Zürich, Switzerland

Sport
- Sport: Rowing

Michael Erdlen (born 7 July 1970) is a Swiss rower. He competed at the 1996 Summer Olympics and the 2000 Summer Olympics.
