= Johan Flodin =

Swedish rower

Personal information
- Nationality: Swedish
- Born: 29 July 1967 (age 57); Mölndal, Sweden

Sport
- Sport: Rowing

Johan Flodin (born 29 July 1967) is a Swedish rower. He competed in the men's quadruple sculls event at the 1996 Summer Olympics.
