= André Steiner (rower) =

German rower

Medal record

Men's rowing

Representing Germany

Olympic Games
Gold medal – first place	1996 Atlanta	Quadruple sculls

World Rowing Championships
Gold medal – first place	1993 Račice	Quadruple sculls
Silver medal – second place	1995 Tampere	Double sculls
Bronze medal – third place	1991 Vienna	Double sculls
Bronze medal – third place	1994 Indianapolis	Quadruple sculls

André Steiner (born 8 February 1970 in Gera) is a retired German rower. During his career Steiner became an Olympic champion and a world champion.
