= Pieter van Andel =

Dutch rower

Personal information
- Nationality: Dutch
- Born: 11 December 1969 (age 55); Hastings, England

Sport
- Sport: Rowing

Pieter van Andel (born 11 December 1969) is a Dutch rower. He competed in the men's quadruple sculls event at the 1996 Summer Olympics.
