= Joris Loefs =

Dutch rower

Personal information
- Nationality: Dutch
- Born: 18 April 1973 (age 51); Breda, Netherlands

Sport
- Sport: Rowing

Joris Loefs (born 18 April 1973) is a Dutch rower. He competed in the men's quadruple sculls event at the 1996 Summer Olympics.
