= Jakub Hanák =

Czech rower

Medal record

Men's rowing

Representing Czech Republic

Olympic Games
| Silver medal – second place | 2004 Athens | Quadruple sculls |

World Rowing Championships
| Silver medal – second place | 2003 Milan | Quadruple sculls |

European Rowing Championships
| Gold medal – first place | 2007 Poznań | M8+ |

Jakub Hanák (born 26 March 1983 in Uherské Hradiště) is a Czech rower.
