= Konstantin Belevich =

Belarusian rower (born 1968)

Personal information
- Nationality: Belarusian
- Born: 16 June 1968 (age 56)

Sport
- Sport: Rowing

Konstantin Belevich (born 16 June 1968) is a Belarusian rower. He competed in the men's quadruple sculls event at the 1996 Summer Olympics.
