= Marlies van der Putten =

Dutch softball player (born 1968)

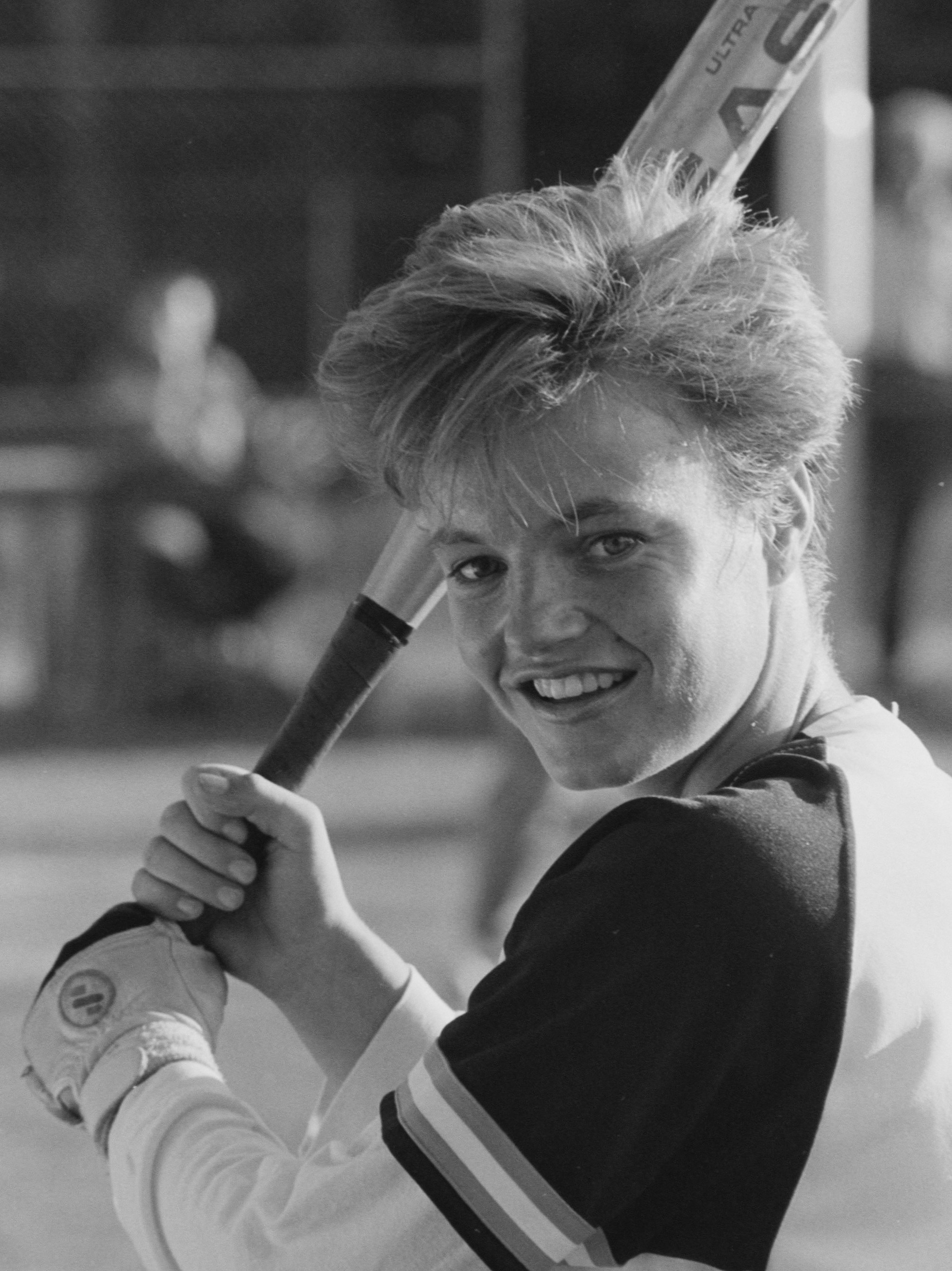
- van der Putten in 1990

Personal information
- Full name: Maria Elisabeth van der Putten
- Nationality: Dutch
- Born: 23 January 1968 (age 57); Velsen, Netherlands

Sport
- Sport: Softball
- Position: Infielder
- Club: Terrasvogels

Maria Elisabeth "Marlies" van der Putten (born 23 January 1968) is a Dutch former softball player. She played as an infielder for the Netherlands women's national softball team and Terrasvogels.

She competed in the women's tournament at the 1996 Summer Olympics.

Van der Putten was born on 23 January 1968. She has at least one sister. She is in relationship with her previous national team member Petra Beek. They live in Velserbroek and have a son and a daughter.
