= Gert de Groot =

Dutch water polo player (born 1970)

Personal information
- Nationality: Dutch
- Born: 24 February 1970 (age 55); Amsterdam, Netherlands

Sport
- Sport: Water polo

Gert de Groot (born 24 February 1970) is a Dutch water polo player. He competed in the men's tournament at the 1996 Summer Olympics.
