= David Jirka =

Czech rower (born 1982)

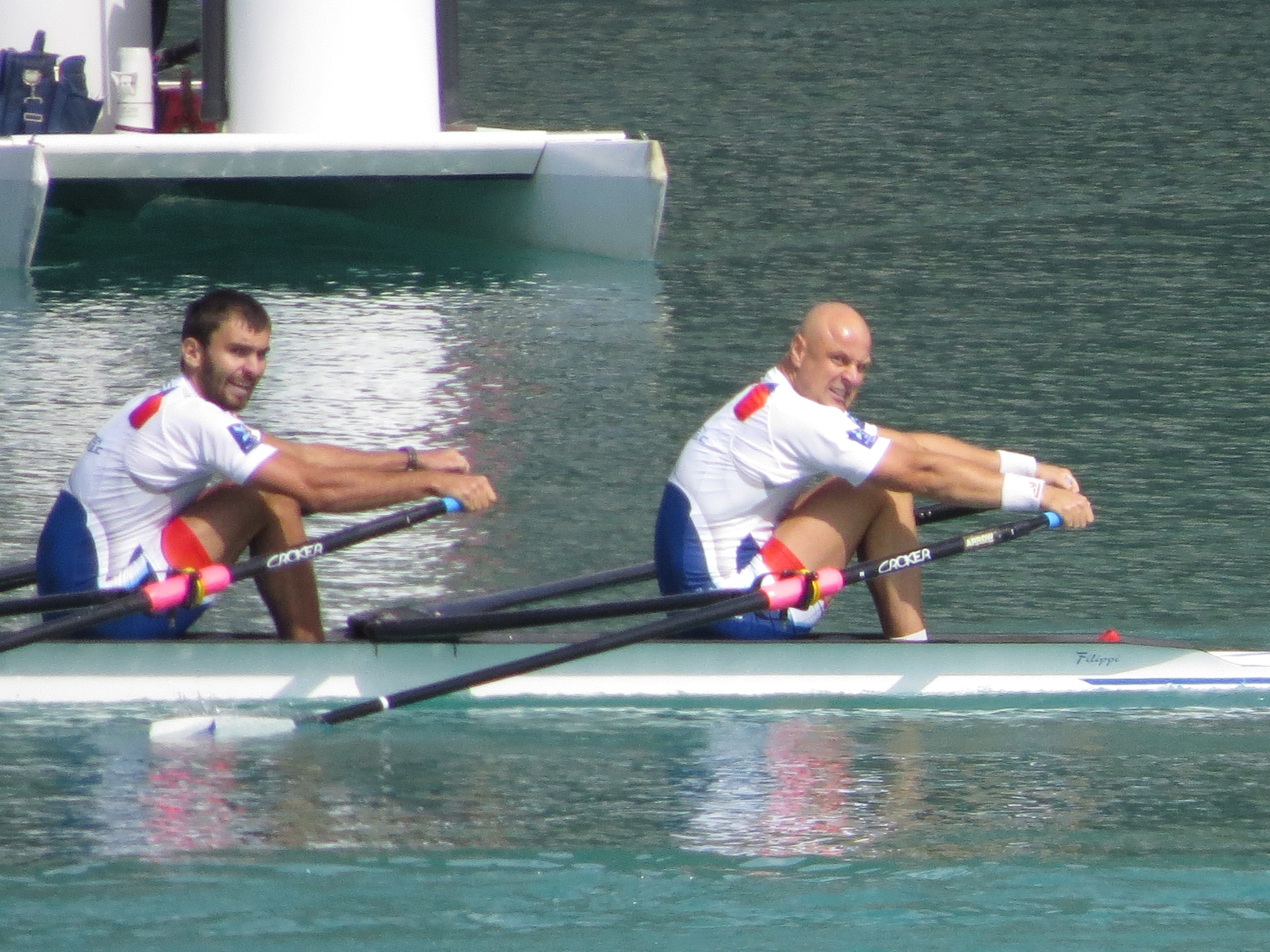
- Jirka (on the right) in 2015

Medal record

Men's rowing

Representing Czech Republic

Olympic Games
Silver medal – second place	2004 Athens	Quadruple sculls

World Rowing Championships
Silver medal – second place	2003 Milan	Quadruple sculls

European Rowing Championships
Bronze medal – third place	2012 Varese	M8+

David Jirka (born 4 January 1982 in Jindřichův Hradec) is a Czech rower.
