= Olivier Gremaud =

Swiss rower

Personal information
- Nationality: Swiss
- Born: 8 March 1979 (age 46); Zürich, Switzerland

Sport
- Sport: Rowing

Olivier Gremaud (born 8 March 1979) is a Swiss rower. He competed in the men's quadruple sculls event at the 2004 Summer Olympics.
