= Ben Holbrook =

American rower (born 1974)

Personal information
- Born: April 20, 1974 (age 52) Oconomowoc, WI, U.S.
- Spouse: Danika Holbrook-Harris

Sport
- Country: United States
- Sport: Rowing
Medal record
Men's rowing
Representing the United States
Pan American Games
Gold medal – first place	1999 Winnipeg	Eight

Ben Holbrook (born April 20, 1974) is an American rower. He competed at the 2004 Summer Olympics in Athens, in the men's quadruple sculls. Holbrook was born in Oconomowoc, Wisconsin.

He won a gold medal at the 1995 World Rowing Championships.

He is married to Danika Holbrook-Harris.
