= Sander van der Marck =

Dutch rower

Personal information
- Nationality: Dutch

Sport
- Sport: Rowing

Sander van der Marck is a Dutch rower. He competed in the men's quadruple sculls event at the 1996 Summer Olympics.
