= Sergey Fedorovtsev =

Russian rower (born 1980)

Personal information
- Born: 31 January 1980 (age 46) Rostov, Russian SFSR, Soviet Union
- Height: 195 cm (6 ft 5 in)
- Weight: 90 kg (198 lb)

Sport
- Sport: Rowing
- Club: Russian Army
Medal record
Representing Russia
Olympic Games
Gold medal – first place	2004 Athens	Quadruple sculls
European Championships
Gold medal – first place	2011 Plovdiv	Quadruple sculls
Gold medal – first place	2015 Poznan	Quadruple sculls

Sergey Anatolyevich Fedorovtsev (Russian: Сергей Анатольевич Федоровцев, born 31 January 1980) is a Russian rower.

== Career ==
Competing in quadruple sculls, he won a gold medal at the 2004 Olympics and the European title in 2011 and 2015. His teams placed seventh and eighth at the 2008 and 2012 Games, respectively.

He was disqualified from competing at the 2016 Olympics after a positive out-of-competition drug test (trimetazidine), and subsequently given a 4-year ban.

== Personal life ==
He is married to fellow rower Ekaterina Fedorovtseva. His older daughter, Arina, is a Russian national volleyball player and his younger daughter, Mariia, is a group rhythmic gymnast who won three gold medals at the 2021 Rhythmic Gymnastics European Championships.
