= Corrine Ockhuijsen =

Dutch softball player (born 1968)

Personal information
- Nationality: Dutch
- Born: 2 February 1968 (age 57); Vlaardingen, Netherlands

Sport
- Sport: Softball

Corrine Ockhuijsen (born 2 February 1968) is a Dutch softball player. She competed in the women's tournament at the 1996 Summer Olympics.
