= Madelon Beek =

Dutch softball player

Personal information
- Full name: Madelon Judith Beek
- Nationality: Dutch
- Born: 28 March 1970 (age 56) Bussum, Netherlands

Sport
- Sport: Softball
- Position: infielder
- Club: HCAW

Madelon Judith Beek (born 28 March 1970) is a Dutch former softball player.

Beek started playing softball when she was young in the mid-1970s with Huizense Zuidvogels. At elite level, she played as an infielder for the Netherlands women's national softball team and HCAW. She won multiple national and international prizes, and was captain of the national team.

With HCWA she became European Champion in 1988, and won the European Cup in 1994. She finished with the national team second at the 1992 ESF Women's Championship. She competed in the women's tournament at the 1996 Summer Olympics. She also competed in World Championships, including at the 1994 championships.

In December 1994 she received the Dutch award for most home runs of the year.

After her playing career she became head coach of the men's softball team BSV de Zuidvogels in Huizen that plays in the highest division in the Netherlands.

She played together with sister Petra Beek with the national team and HCAW.

Beek works as a civil servant at the municipality of Almere as a social domain area specialist. She is married and has two children.
