= Marjolein de Jong (softball) =

Dutch softball player (born 1967)

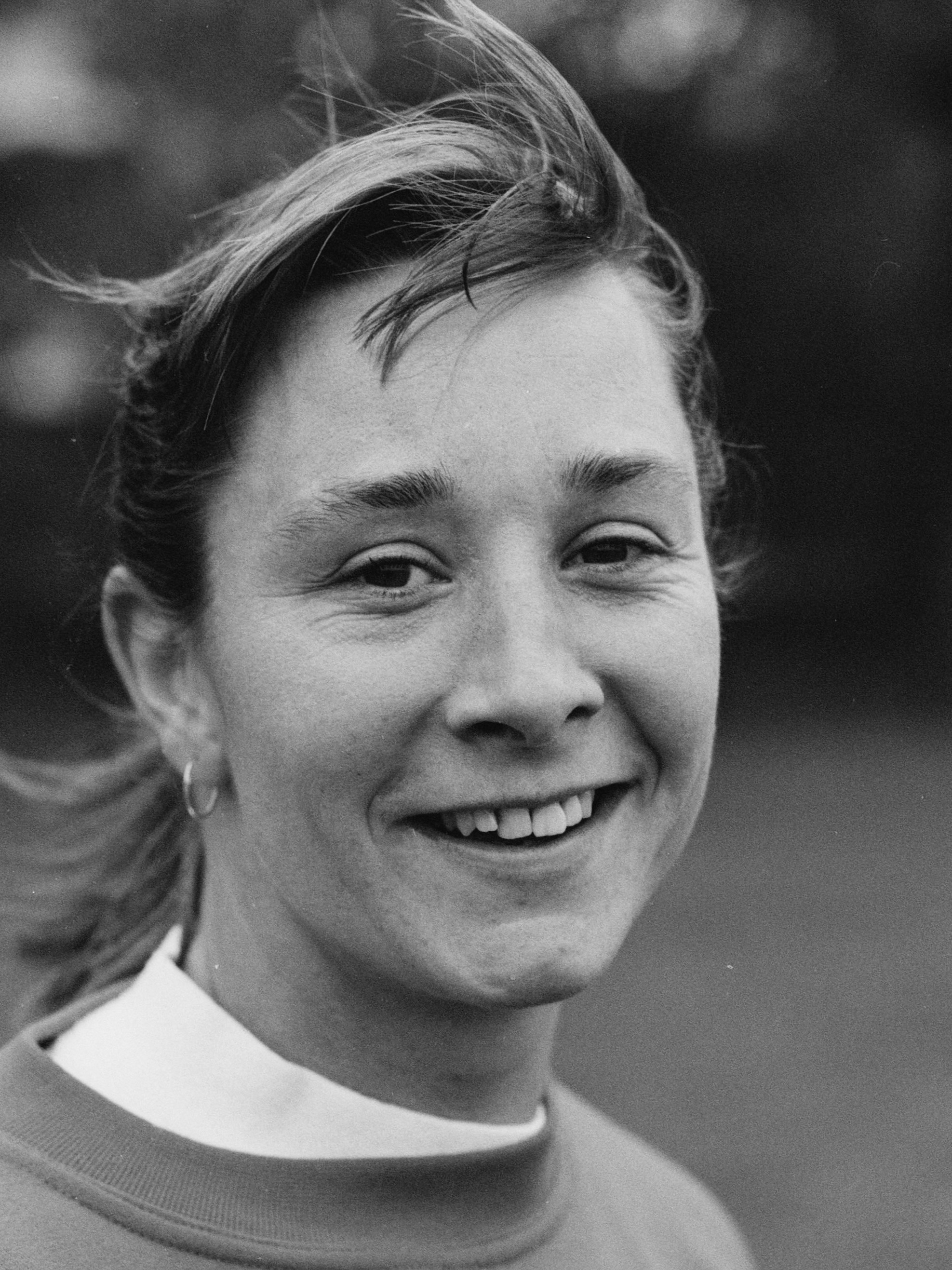
- Marjolein de Jong in 1996

Personal information
- Nationality: Dutch
- Born: 1 February 1967 (age 58); Velsen, Netherlands

Sport
- Sport: Softball

Marjolein de Jong (born 1 February 1967) is a Dutch softball player. She competed in the women's tournament at the 1996 Summer Olympics.
