= Adri Middag =

Dutch rower

Personal information
- Nationality: Dutch
- Born: 24 January 1973 (age 52); Zwolle, Netherlands

Sport
- Sport: Rowing

Adri Middag (born 24 January 1973) is a Dutch rower. He competed at the 1996 Summer Olympics and the 2000 Summer Olympics.
