= Nikolay Spinyov =

Russian rower

Personal information
- Native name: Николай Спинёв
- Born: Nikolay Nikolayevich Spinyov; 31 May 1974 (age 52) Rostov-on-Don, Russian SFSR, Soviet Union
Medal record
Men's rowing
Representing Russia
Olympic Games
Gold medal – first place	2004 Athens	Quadruple sculls

Nikolay Nikolayevich Spinyov (Russian: Николай Николаевич Спинёв, born 30 May 1974 in Rostov-on-Don) is a Russian rower. He won a gold medal at the 2004 Summer Olympics.
