= Christian Stofer =

Swiss rower

Personal information
- Nationality: Swiss
- Born: 23 January 1976 (age 49); Sursee, Switzerland

Sport
- Sport: Rowing

Christian Stofer (born 23 January 1976) is a Swiss former rower. He competed at the 2000 Summer Olympics and the 2004 Summer Olympics.
