= Simon Stürm =

Swiss rower

Personal information
- Nationality: Swiss
- Born: 24 April 1973 (age 53) Lucerne, Switzerland

Sport
- Sport: Rowing

Simon Stürm (born 24 April 1973) is a Swiss rower. He competed at the 1996 Summer Olympics, 2000 Summer Olympics and the 2004 Summer Olympics.
