= Gonny Reijnen =

Dutch softball player (born 1967)

Personal information
- Full name: Gerardina Henriette Maria "Gonny" Reijnen
- Nationality: Dutch
- Born: 4 March 1967 (age 58); Haarlem, Netherlands

Sport
- Sport: Softball

Gonny Farley-Reijnen (born 4 March 1967) is a Dutch softball player. She competed in the women's tournament at the 1996 Summer Olympics.

She is Master Docent CIOS (Centraal Instituut Opleiding Sportleiders). Her husband is a former US baseball player Brian Farley.
