= Florian Stofer =

Swiss rower

Personal information
- Nationality: Swiss
- Born: 25 June 1981 (age 43); Sursee, Switzerland

Sport
- Sport: Rowing

Florian Stofer (born 25 June 1981) is a Swiss former rower. He competed at the 2004 Summer Olympics and the 2012 Summer Olympics.
