= Penny le Noble =

Dutch softball player (born 1972)

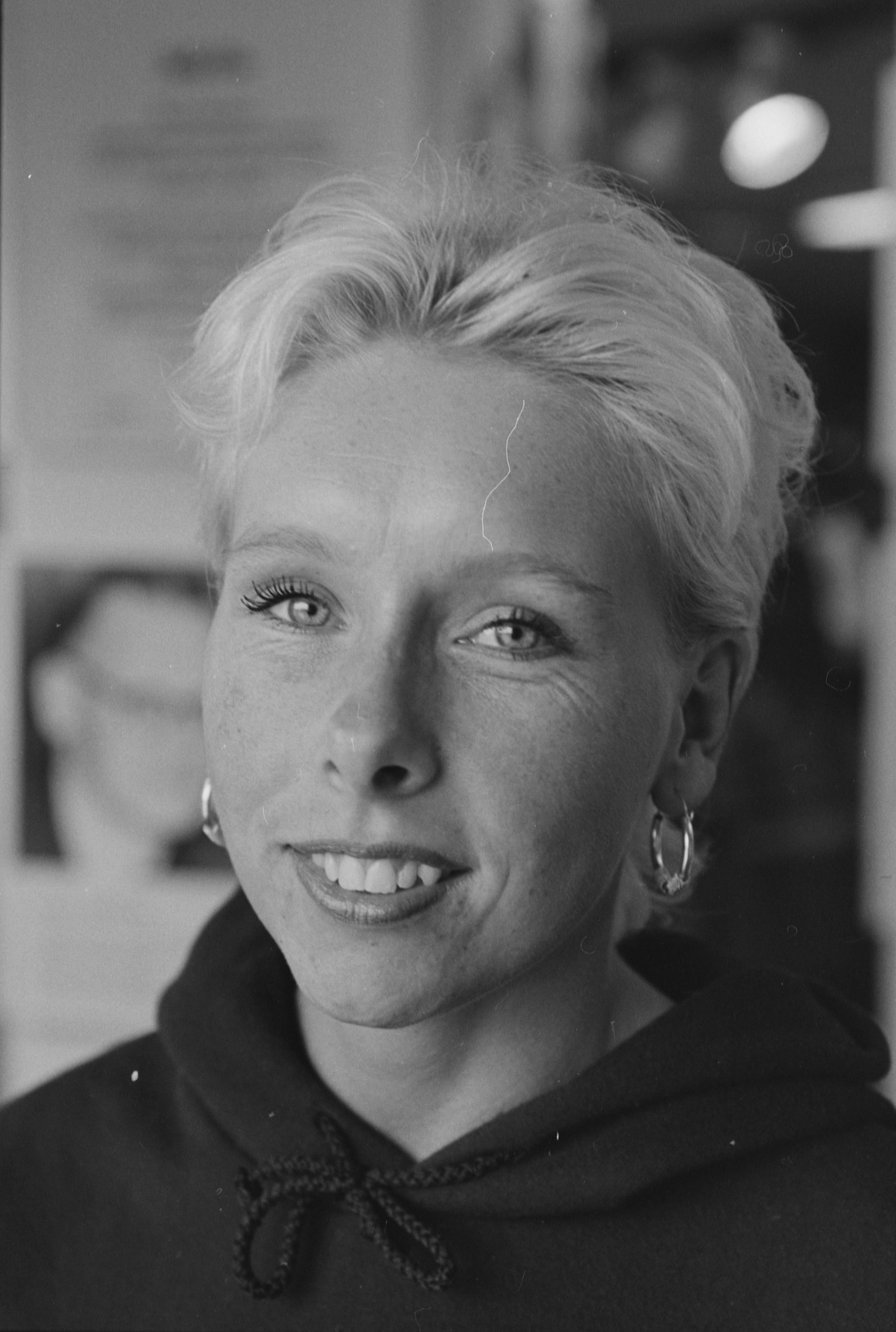
- Le Noble (1996)

Personal information
- Nationality: Dutch
- Born: 2 February 1972 (age 53); Haarlem, Netherlands

Sport
- Sport: Softball

Penny le Noble (born 2 February 1972) is a Dutch softball player. She competed in the women's tournament at the 1996 Summer Olympics.
