= Martin van der Spoel =

Dutch swimmer

Personal information
- Born: February 19, 1971 (age 55) Ermelo, Gelderland

Sport
- Sport: Swimming
- Strokes: Freestyle, medley

Martin Michel van der Spoel (born 19 February 1971 in ) is a former freestyle and medley swimmer from the Netherlands, who competed for his native country at the 1996 Summer Olympics in Atlanta, Georgia. There he finished in tenth place in the 200m individual medley, and in fifth (4x100) and seventh position (4x200) with the freestyle relay teams.

Van der Spoel was the biggest national rival of compatriot Marcel Wouda, who would become the nation's first male world champion in swimming in 1998.
