= Igor Kravtsov =

Russian rower (born 1973)

Personal information
- Native name: Игорь Кравцов
- Born: 21 December 1973 (age 52) Magnitogorsk, Russian SFSR, Soviet Union
Medal record
Men's rowing
Representing Russia
Olympic Games
Gold medal – first place	2004 Athens	Quadruple sculls

Igor Kravtsov (born 21 December 1973 in Magnitogorsk) is a Russian rower. He won a gold medal at the 2004 Summer Olympics.
