= Leonid Shaposhnikov =

Ukrainian rower

Personal information
- Born: 30 October 1969 (age 56) Khabarovsk, Soviet Union

Sport
- Sport: Rowing
Medal record
Representing Ukraine
Olympic Games
Bronze medal – third place	2004 Athens	Quadruple sculls
World Rowing Championships
Silver medal – second place	1993 Račice	M4x
Silver medal – second place	1994 Indianapolis	M4x
Silver medal – second place	1999 St. Catharines	M4x
Bronze medal – third place	1997 Aiguebelette	M4x
Summer Universiade
Gold medal – first place	1993 Buffalo	Quadruple sculls
Representing Soviet Union
World Rowing Championships
Silver medal – second place	1991 Vienna	M2x
Summer Universiade
Gold medal – first place	1989 Duisburg	Quadruple sculls

Leonid Anatoliyovych Shaposhnikov (Ukrainian: Леонід Анатолійович Шапошніков; born 30 October 1969) is a Ukrainian rower.
