= Rowing at the 2000 Summer Olympics – Women's eight =

Women's eight at the Games of the XXVII Olympiad
- Venue: Sydney International Regatta Centre
- Date: 18–24 September 2000
- Competitors: 63 from 7 nations
- Winning time: 6:06.44

Medalists
1st place, gold medalist(s)		Veronica Cochela; Georgeta Damian; Maria Magdalena Dumitrache; Liliana Gafencu; Elena Georgescu; Doina Ignat; Elisabeta Lipă; Ioana Olteanu; Viorica Susanu	Romania
2nd place, silver medalist(s)		Tessa Appeldoorn; Carin ter Beek; Pieta van Dishoeck; Elien Meijer; Eeke van Nes; Nelleke Penninx; Martijntje Quik; Anneke Venema; Marieke Westerhof	Netherlands
3rd place, bronze medalist(s)		Buffy Alexander; Laryssa Biesenthal; Heather Davis; Alison Korn; Theresa Luke; Heather McDermid; Emma Robinson; Lesley Thompson; Dorota Urbaniak	Canada

The women's eight competition at the 2000 Summer Olympics in Sydney, Australia took place at the Sydney International Regatta Centre.

== Competition format ==
This rowing event consisted of seven teams, split into two heats. Each team fielded a boat crewed by eight rowers and a coxswain. Each rower used a single oar, with four oars on each side of the boat. The winner of each heat qualified for the final (or medal) round. The remaining six teams competed in the repechage round, with the top four from that round qualifying for the "Final A" round. The last team in the repechage is eliminated from the competition.

The final ranking for this event was based on the order of finish. The top three teams earned Olympic medals for placing first, second, and third, while the remaining "Final A" teams placed fourth through sixth, according to their final finish.

== Schedule ==
All times are Australian Time (UTC+10)

Date	Time	Round
Monday, 18 September 2000	11:00	Heats
Wednesday, 20 September 2000	10:20	Repechages
Sunday, 24 September 2000	10:10	Final

== Results ==
=== Heats ===
The winner of each heat advanced to the finals, remainder goes to the repechage.

==== Heat 1 ====
Rank	Rower	Country	Time	Notes
1	Cochela, Damian, Dumitrache, Gafencu, Georgescu, Ignat, Lipă, Olteanu, Susanu	Romania	6:06.66	A
2	Davies, Foulkes, Kininmonth, Larsen, Martin, Roberts, Robinson, Thompson, Winter	Australia	6:17.44	R
3	Bazilevskaya, Berazniova, Bichyk, Helakh, Khokhlova (cox), Kuzhmar, Tratseuskaya, Zakhareuskaya, Znak	Belarus	6:19.02	R
4	Beever, Carroll, Eyre, Laverick, Mackenzie, Miller, Sanders, Trickey, Zino	Great Britain	6:19.49	R

==== Heat 2 ====
Rank	Rower	Country	Time	Notes
1	Appledoorn, ter Beek, van Dishoeck, Meijer, van Nes, Penninx, Quik, Venema, Westerhof	Netherlands	6:11.29	A
2	Alexander, Biesenthal, Davis, Korn, Luke, McDermid, Robinson, Thompson, Urbaniak	Canada	6:13.60	R
3	Folk, Fuller, Jones, Maloney, Martin, McCagg, Miller, Nelson, Shah	United States	6:17.37	R

=== Repechage ===
First four qualify to Finals A.

Rank	Rower	Country	Time	Notes
1	Folk, Fuller, Jones, Maloney, Martin, McCagg, Miller, Nelson, Shah	United States	6:17.36	A
2	Alexander, Biesenthal, Davis, Korn, Luke, McDermid, Robinson, Thompson, Urbaniak	Canada	6:17.62	A
3	Davies, Foulkes, Kininmonth, Larsen, Martin, Roberts, Robinson, Thompson, Winter	Australia	6:17.72	A
4	Bazilevskaya, Berazniova, Bichyk, Helakh, Khokhlova (cox), Kuzhmar, Tratseuskaya, Zakhareuskaya, Znak	Belarus	6:19.42	A
5	Beever, Carroll, Eyre, Laverick, Mackenzie, Miller, Sanders, Trickey, Zino	Great Britain	6:23.46	

=== Finals ===
Rank	Rower	Country	Time	Notes
1st place, gold medalist(s)	Cochela, Damian, Dumitrache, Gafencu, Georgescu, Ignat, Lipă, Olteanu, Susanu	Romania	6:06.44	
2nd place, silver medalist(s)	Appeldoorn, ter Beek, van Dishoeck, Meijer, van Nes, Penninx, Quik, Venema, Westerhof	Netherlands	6:09.39	
3rd place, bronze medalist(s)	Alexander, Biesenthal, Davis, Korn, Luke, McDermid, Robinson, Thompson, Urbaniak	Canada	6:11.58	
4	Bazilevskaya, Berazniova, Bichyk, Helakh, Khokhlova (cox), Kuzhmar, Tratseuskaya, Zakhareuskaya, Znak	Belarus	6:13.57	
5	Davies, Foulkes, Kininmonth, Larsen, Martin, Roberts, Robinson, Thompson, Winter	Australia	6:15.16	
6	Folk, Fuller, Jones, Maloney, Martin, McCagg, Miller, Nelson, Shah	United States	6:16.87	
