= Great Britain at the 2000 Summer Olympics =

- Flag of the United Kingdom
- IOC code: GBR
- NOC: British Olympic Association

in Sydney
- Competitors: 310 (181 men, 129 women) in 23 sports
- Flag bearers: Matthew Pinsent (opening); Steve Redgrave (closing)
- Medals Ranked 10th: Gold 11 Silver 10 Bronze 7 Total 28

Summer Olympics appearances (overview)
- 1896; 1900; 1904; 1908; 1912; 1920; 1924; 1928; 1932; 1936; 1948; 1952; 1956; 1960; 1964; 1968; 1972; 1976; 1980; 1984; 1988; 1992; 1996; 2000; 2004; 2008; 2012; 2016; 2020; 2024; 2028

Other related appearances
- 1906 Intercalated Games

Great Britain, represented by the British Olympic Association (BOA), competed at the 2000 Summer Olympics in Sydney, Australia. British athletes have competed in every Summer Olympic Games. 310 competitors, 181 men and 129 women, took part in 179 events in 23 sports. These were the first Summer Olympics in which the team of selected athletes was officially known as Team GB in a highly successful attempt to unify all the competing athletes across all the sports and events and boost team morale. Going into the games following their exceptionally poor performance in Atlanta widespread expectations of the team were low.

The Sydney Games was at the time the best performance by Great Britain in the Summer Olympic Games since 1920, with British competitors winning a total of 28 medals, 11 of which were gold. This represented a vast improvement in performance over the previous Summer Olympics in 1996, in which Great Britain won only one gold medal and 15 in total, and was the first of five consecutive Summer Olympics in which Great Britain would not only dramatically increase its overall performance and expectations but also see them dramatically increase its overall Summer Olympics medal tally. This was also the first Summer Olympic Games where British competitors benefited from £58.9m of National Lottery funding when it was introduced in 1997.

== Medallists ==
Medal	Name	Sport	Event	Date
Gold	Jason Queally	Cycling	Men's track time trial	16 September
Gold	Richard Faulds	Shooting	Men's double trap	20 September
Gold	James Cracknell; Tim Foster; Matthew Pinsent; Steve Redgrave	Rowing	Men's coxless four	23 September
Gold	Denise Lewis	Athletics	Women's heptathlon	24 September
Gold	Louis Attrill; Simon Dennis; Rowley Douglas (cox); Ben Hunt-Davis; Luka Grubor; Andrew Lindsay; Fred Scarlett; Steve Trapmore; Kieran West	Rowing	Men's eight	24 September
Gold	Jonathan Edwards	Athletics	Men's triple jump	25 September
Gold	Shirley Robertson	Sailing	Europe	29 September
Gold	Ben Ainslie	Sailing	Laser	29 September
Gold	Iain Percy	Sailing	Finn	30 September
Gold	Audley Harrison	Boxing	Super Heavyweight	1 October
Gold	Steph Cook	Modern pentathlon	Women's competition	1 October
Silver	Chris Hoy; Craig MacLean; Jason Queally	Cycling	Men's team sprint	17 September
Silver	Ian Peel	Shooting	Men's trap	17 September
Silver	Kate Howey	Judo	Women's 70 kg	18 September
Silver	Jeanette Brakewell; Pippa Funnell; Leslie Law; Ian Stark	Equestrian	Team eventing	19 September
Silver	Paul Ratcliffe	Canoeing	Men's slalom K-1	20 September
Silver	Steve Backley	Athletics	Men's javelin throw	23 September
Silver	Guin Batten; Miriam Batten; Katherine Grainger; Gillian Lindsay	Rowing	Women's quadruple sculls	24 September
Silver	Ian Barker; Simon Hiscocks	Sailing	49er	25 September
Silver	Darren Campbell	Athletics	Men's 200 m	28 September
Silver	Mark Covell; Ian Walker	Sailing	Star	30 September
Bronze	Paul Manning; Chris Newton; Bryan Steel; Bradley Wiggins	Cycling	Men's team pursuit	18 September
Bronze	Yvonne McGregor	Cycling	Women's individual pursuit	18 September
Bronze	Simon Archer; Joanne Goode	Badminton	Mixed doubles	21 September
Bronze	Katharine Merry	Athletics	Women's 400 m	25 September
Bronze	Kelly Holmes	Athletics	Women's 800 m	25 September
Bronze	Tim Brabants	Canoeing	Men's K-1 1000 m	30 September
Bronze	Kate Allenby	Modern pentathlon	Women's competition	1 October

Medals by sport
Sport	1st place, gold medalist(s)	2nd place, silver medalist(s)	3rd place, bronze medalist(s)	Total
Sailing	3	2	0	5
Athletics	2	2	2	6
Rowing	2	1	0	3
Cycling	1	1	2	4
Shooting	1	1	0	2
Modern pentathlon	1	0	1	2
Boxing	1	0	0	1
Canoeing	0	1	1	2
Equestrian	0	1	0	1
Judo	0	1	0	1
Badminton	0	0	1	1
Total	11	10	7	28

Medals by date
Day	Date	1st place, gold medalist(s)	2nd place, silver medalist(s)	3rd place, bronze medalist(s)	Total
1	16 Sep	1	0	0	1
2	17 Sep	0	2	0	2
3	18 Sep	0	1	2	3
4	19 Sep	0	1	0	1
5	20 Sep	1	1	0	2
6	21 Sep	0	0	1	1
7	22 Sep	0	0	0	0
8	23 Sep	1	1	0	2
9	24 Sep	2	1	0	3
10	25 Sep	1	1	2	4
11	26 Sep	0	0	0	0
12	27 Sep	0	0	0	0
13	28 Sep	0	1	0	1
14	29 Sep	2	0	0	2
15	30 Sep	1	1	1	3
16	1 Oct	2	0	1	3
Total		11	10	7	28

Multiple medalists
Name	Sport	1st place, gold medalist(s)	2nd place, silver medalist(s)	3rd place, bronze medalist(s)	Total
Jason Queally	Cycling	1	1	0	2

=== Multiple medallists ===
The following Team GB competitors won multiple medals at the 2000 Olympic Games.

Name	Medal	Sport	Event
Jason Queally	Gold; Silver	Cycling	1km time trial Men's team sprint

== Archery ==
The three British archers had a combined record of 3-3.

Athlete	Event	Ranking round		Round of 64	Round of 32	Round of 16	Quarterfinals	Semifinals	Final / BM	
Athlete	Event	Score	Seed	Opposition Score	Opposition Score	Opposition Score	Opposition Score	Opposition Score	Opposition Score	Rank
Simon Needham	Men's individual	641	9	Uprichard (NZL); W 160–155	Arias (CUB); L 164 (7)–164 (9)	Did not advance				
Vladlena Priestman	Women's individual	618	46	Pfohlj (GER); L 155–159	Did not advance					
Alison Williamson	Women's individual	635	20	Nordlander (SWE); W 156–145	Altınkaynak (TUR); W 157–154	Yun M-j (KOR); L 164–173	Did not advance			

== Athletics ==
Key

- Note–Ranks given for track events are within the athlete's heat only
- Q = Qualified for the next round
- q = Qualified for the next round as a fastest loser or, in field events, by position without achieving the qualifying target
- NR = National record
- N/A = Round not applicable for the event
- Bye = Athlete not required to compete in round

Men
Track & road events

Athlete	Event	Heat		Quarterfinal		Semifinal		Final	
Athlete	Event	Result	Rank	Result	Rank	Result	Rank	Result	Rank
Darren Campbell	100 m	10.28	1 Q	10.12	1 Q	10.19	3 Q	10.13	6
Dwain Chambers	100 m	10.38	2 Q	10.12	1 Q	10.14	1 Q	10.08	4
Jason Gardener	100 m	10.38	1 Q	10.27	4	Did not advance			
Darren Campbell	200 m	20.71	2 Q	20.13	1 Q	20.23	2 Q	20.14	2nd place, silver medalist(s)
Marlon Devonish	200 m	20.89	3 Q	20.82	7	Did not advance			
Christian Malcolm	200 m	20.52	2 Q	20.19	2 Q	20.19	2 Q	20.23	5
Sean Baldock	400 m	46.45	5	Did not advance					
Jamie Baulch	400 m	46.52	7	Did not advance					
Daniel Caines	400 m	45.39	2 Q	45.37	3 Q	45.55	5	Did not advance	
Andrew Hart	800 m	1:48.78	6	—N/a		Did not advance			
James McIlroy	800 m	1:47.44	3 q	—N/a		1:46.39	6	Did not advance	
Andrew Graffin	1500 m	3:39.75	11 q	—N/a		3:42.72	10	Did not advance	
John Mayock	1500 m	3:39.08	4 Q	—N/a		3:38.68	7 q	3:39.41	9
Anthony Whiteman	1500 m	DNF		—N/a		Did not advance			
Kristen Bowditch	5000 m	14:11.65	15	—N/a				Did not advance	
Robert Denmark	10000 m	28:43.74	13	—N/a				Did not advance	
Andres Jones	10000 m	28:11.20	9	—N/a				Did not advance	
Karl Keska	10000 m	27:48.29	6 Q	—N/a				27:44.09	8
Damien Greaves	110 m hurdles	14.01	7 q	14.08	8	Did not advance			
Colin Jackson	110 m hurdles	13.38	1 Q	13.27	1 Q	13.34	3 Q	13.28	5
Tony Jarrett	110 m hurdles	DSQ		Did not advance					
Anthony Borsumato	400 m hurdles	50.73	5	—N/a		Did not advance			
Matt Douglas	400 m hurdles	49.62	3 q	—N/a		49.53	6	Did not advance	
Christopher Rawlinson	400 m hurdles	51.30	1 Q	—N/a		49.25	6	Did not advance	
Justin Chaston	3000 m steeplechase	8:31.01	7	—N/a				Did not advance	
Christian Stephenson	3000 m steeplechase	8:46.66	10	—N/a				Did not advance	
Dwain Chambers; Allyn Condon; Marlon Devonish; Jason Gardener	4 × 100 m relay	DSQ		—N/a		Did not advance			
Jamie Baulch; Daniel Caines; Jared Deacon; Iwan Thomas	4 × 400 m relay	3:04.35	2 Q	—N/a		3:01.35	2 Q	3:01.22	5
Jon Brown	Marathon	—N/a						2:11:17	4
Keith Cullen	Marathon	—N/a						2:16:59	19
Mark Steinle	Marathon	—N/a						2:24:42	56
Chris Maddocks	50 km walk	—N/a						4:52:12	39

Field events

Athlete	Event	Qualification		Final	
Athlete	Event	Distance	Position	Distance	Position
Onochie Achike	Triple jump	17.30	1 Q	17.29	5
Jonathan Edwards	Triple jump	17.08	4 Q	17.71	1st place, gold medalist(s)
Phillips Idowu	Triple jump	17.12	2 Q	17.08	6
Ben Challenger	High jump	2.15	27	Did not advance	
Kevin Hughes	Pole vault	5.55	16	Did not advance	
Mark Proctor	Shot put	18.49	31	Did not advance	
Glen Smith	Discus throw	56.22	38	Did not advance	
Robert Weir	Discus throw	60.01	28	Did not advance	
Steve Backley	Javelin throw	83.74	9 Q	89.85	2nd place, silver medalist(s)
Michael Hill	Javelin throw	82.24	12 q	81.00	11
Nick Nieland	Javelin throw	82.12	13	Did not advance	

Combined events – Decathlon

Athlete	Event	100 m	LJ	SP	HJ	400 m	110H	DT	PV	JT	1500 m	Final	Rank
Dean Macey	Result	10.81	7.77	14.62	2.09	46.41	14.53	43.37	4.80	60.38	4:23.45	8567	4
Dean Macey	Points	903	1002	766	887	988	907	733	849	744	788	8567	4

Women
Track & road events

Athlete	Event	Heat		Quarterfinal		Semifinal		Final	
Athlete	Event	Result	Rank	Result	Rank	Result	Rank	Result	Rank
Shani Anderson	100 m	11.55	5	Did not advance					
Joice Maduaka	100 m	11.51	5	Did not advance					
Marcia Richardson	100 m	11.62	4	Did not advance					
Samantha Davies	200 m	23.36	5 q	23.20	7	Did not advance			
Joice Maduaka	200 m	23.36	5 q	23.57	7	Did not advance			
Allison Curbishley	400 m	52.20	4 q	52.50	7	Did not advance			
Donna Fraser	400 m	52.33	3 Q	50.77	3 Q	50.21	4 Q	49.79	4
Katharine Merry	400 m	51.61	1 Q	50.50	1 Q	50.32	2 Q	49.72	3rd place, bronze medalist(s)
Kelly Holmes	800 m	2:01.76	1 Q	—N/a		1:58.45	2 Q	1:56.80	3rd place, bronze medalist(s)
Diane Modahl	800 m	2:02.41	5	—N/a		Did not advance			
Kelly Holmes	1500 m	4:10.38	3 Q	—N/a		4:05.35	4 Q	4:08.02	7
Helen Pattinson	1500 m	4:08.80	6 Q	—N/a		4:09.60	9	Did not advance	
Hayley Tullett	1500 m	4:10.58	3 Q	—N/a		4:05.34	3 Q	4:22.29	11
Jo Pavey	5000 m	15:08.82	2 Q	—N/a				14:58.27	12
Andrea Whitcombe	5000 m	16:15.82	15	—N/a				Did not advance	
Paula Radcliffe	10000 m	32:34.73	6 Q	—N/a				30:26.97	4
Diane Allahgreen	100 m hurdles	13.11	5 q	13.22	8	Did not advance			
Natasha Danvers	400 m hurdles	55.68	3 q	—N/a		54.95	3 Q	55.00	8
Sinead Dudgeon	400 m hurdles	57.82	4	—N/a		Did not advance			
Keri Maddox	400 m hurdles	57.44	5	—N/a		Did not advance			
Shani Anderson; Samantha Davies; Joice Maduaka; Marcia Richardson; Sarah Wilhelmy	4 × 100 m relay	43.26	4 q	—N/a		43.19	5	Did not advance	
Allison Curbishley; Natasha Danvers; Donna Fraser; Helen Frost; Katharine Merry	4 × 400 m relay	3:25.28	1 Q	—N/a				3:25.67	6
Marian Sutton	Marathon	—N/a						2:34:33	26
Lisa Kehler	20 km walk	—N/a						1:37:47	33

Field events

Athlete	Event	Qualification		Final	
Athlete	Event	Distance	Position	Distance	Position
Jo Wise	Long jump	6.59	12	Did not advance	
Ashia Hansen	Triple jump	14.29	6 Q	13.44	11
Janine Whitlock	Pole vault	4.15	20	Did not advance	
Judy Oakes	Shot put	17.81	13	Did not advance	
Lorraine Shaw	Hammer throw	63.21	11 q	64.27	9

Combined events – Heptathlon

Athlete	Event	100H	HJ	SP	200 m	LJ	JT	800 m	Final	Rank
Denise Lewis	Result	13.23	1.75	15.55	24.34	6.48	50.19	2:16.83	6584	1st place, gold medalist(s)
Denise Lewis	Points	1090	916	898	948	1001	864	867	6584	1st place, gold medalist(s)

== Badminton ==
Men

Athlete	Event	Round of 64	Round of 32	Round of 16	Quarterfinal	Semifinal	Final / BM	
Athlete	Event	Opposition Score	Opposition Score	Opposition Score	Opposition Score	Opposition Score	Opposition Score	Rank
Peter Knowles	Singles	Bye	Ong E H (MAS); L 5–15, 15–12, 3–15	Did not advance				
Richard Vaughan	Singles	Ponsana (THA); W 15–8, 15–12	Wengberg (SWE); W 15–8, 15–4	Sun J (CHN); L 10–15, 8–15	Did not advance			
Simon Archer; Nathan Robertson	Doubles	—N/a	Bye	Łogosz / Mateusiak (POL); W 15–1, 15–10	Gunawan / Wijaya (INA); L 13–15, 11–15	Did not advance		

Women

Athlete	Event	Round of 64	Round of 32	Round of 16	Quarterfinal	Semifinal	Final / BM	
Athlete	Event	Opposition Score	Opposition Score	Opposition Score	Opposition Score	Opposition Score	Opposition Score	Rank
Julia Mann	Singles	Sawaram (MRI); W 11–0, 11–0	Pohar (SLO); W 11–4, 11–7	Mizui (JPN); L 9–11, 5–11	Did not advance			
Kelly Morgan	Singles	Popat (IND); W 5–11, 11–7, 11–2	Koon W C (HKG); W 8–11, 11–3, 11–1	Martin (DEN); L 7–11, 3–11	Did not advance			
Joanne Goode; Donna Kellogg	Doubles	—N/a	Bye	Cloutier / Hermitage (CAN); W 15–4, 15–10	Gao L / Qin Y (CHN); L 2–15, 7–15	Did not advance		
Joanne Davies; Sarah Hardaker	Doubles	—N/a	Lomban / Nathanael (INA); W 15–3, 15–11	Chung J-h / Ra K-m (KOR); L 6–15, 1–15	Did not advance			

Mixed

Athlete	Event	Round of 64	Round of 32	Round of 16	Quarterfinal	Semifinal	Final / BM	
Athlete	Event	Opposition Score	Opposition Score	Opposition Score	Opposition Score	Opposition Score	Opposition Score	Rank
Simon Archer; Joanne Goode	Doubles	—N/a	Olynyk / Hermitage (CAN); W 15–9, 15–9	Holst-Christensen / Jørgensen (DEN); W 15–17, 15–11, 15–7	Bruil / van den Heuvel (NED); W 15–12, 15–12	Haryanto / Timur (INA); L 15–12, 15–17, 11–15	Søgaard / Olsen (DEN); W 15–4, 12–17, 17–14	3rd place, bronze medalist(s)
Chris Hunt; Donna Kellogg	Doubles	—N/a	Suprianto / Resiana (INA); L 10–15, 1–15	Did not advance				

== Boxing ==
Athlete	Event	Round of 32	Round of 16	Quarterfinals	Semifinals	Final	
Athlete	Event	Opposition Result	Opposition Result	Opposition Result	Opposition Result	Opposition Result	Rank
Courtney Fry	Light heavyweight	Adamu (GHA); L 3–16	Did not advance				
Audley Harrison	Super heavyweight	—N/a	Lezin (RUS); W RSC	Mazikin (UKR); W 19–9	Vidoz (ITA); W 32–16	Dildabekov (KAZ); W 30–16	1st place, gold medalist(s)

== Canoeing ==
=== Slalom ===
Athlete	Event	Preliminary						Final					
Athlete	Event	Run 1	Rank	Run 2	Rank	Total	Rank	Run 1	Rank	Run 2	Rank	Total	Rank
Stuart McIntosh	Men's C-1	136.55	10	137.84	9	274.39	10 Q	121.23	8	122.38	8	243.61	8
Stuart Bowman; Nick Smith	Men's C-2	138.95	4	141.65	6	280.60	4 Q	123.85	5	126.08	4	249.93	4
Paul Ratcliffe	Men's K-1	126.59	2	127.10	6	253.69	3 Q	112.22	3	111.49	3	223.71	2nd place, silver medalist(s)
Laura Blakeman	Women's K-1	155.47	12	156.00	16	311.47	13 Q	136.91	12	136.80	14	273.71	12

=== Sprint ===
Athlete	Event	Heats		Semifinals		Final	
Athlete	Event	Time	Rank	Time	Rank	Time	Rank
Andrew Train; Stephen Train	Men's C-2 500 m	1:46.986	5 q	1:49.931	9	Did not advance	
Andrew Train; Stephen Train	Men's C-2 1000 m	3:39.599	4 q	3:45.624	4	Did not advance	
Ian Wynne	Men's K-1 500 m	1:42.779	2 q	1:41.485	4	Did not advance	
Tim Brabants	Men's K-1 1000 m	3:36.903	3 q	3:37.425	2 Q	3:35.057	3rd place, bronze medalist(s)
Paul Darby-Dowman; Ross Sabberton	Men's K-2 500 m	1:32.782	3 q	1:33.173	7	Did not advance	
Paul Darby-Dowman; Ross Sabberton	Men's K-2 1000 m	3:19.392	4 q	3:19.826	5	Did not advance	
Anna Hemmings	Women's K-1 500 m	1:59.190	8 q	1:59.664	9	Did not advance	

== Cycling ==
=== Road ===
Men

Athlete	Event	Time	Rank
Chris Boardman	Time trial	59.32	11
Nick Craig	Road race	Did not finish	
Rob Hayles	Road race	Did not finish	
Jeremy Hunt	Road race	Did not finish	
David Millar	Time trial	1:00.17	16
Max Sciandri	Road race	5:30:46	35
John Tanner	Road race	5:30:46	38

Women

Athlete	Event	Time	Rank
Ceris Gilfillan	Road race	3:06:37	27
Ceris Gilfillan	Time trial	44:29	14
Yvonne McGregor	Road race	3:06:31	24
Yvonne McGregor	Time trial	44:37.09	17
Sara Symington	Road race	3:06:31	10

=== Track ===
Sprint

Athlete	Event	Qualification		Round 1	Repechage 1	Round 2	Repechage 2	Quarterfinals	Semifinals	Final	
Athlete	Event	Time Speed (km/h)	Rank	Opposition Time Speed (km/h)	Opposition Time Speed (km/h)	Opposition Time Speed (km/h)	Opposition Time Speed (km/h)	Opposition Time Speed (km/h)	Opposition Time Speed (km/h)	Opposition Time Speed (km/h)	Rank
Craig MacLean	Men's sprint	10.459; 68.840	7	Villanueva (ESP); L REL	Ota (JPN); W 10.951; 65.747	Gané (FRA); L	Bērziņš (LAT); Arrue (USA); W 11.108; 64.818	Nothstein (USA); L, L	Did not advance	5th place final van Eijden (GER); Villanueva (ESP); Eadie (AUS); L	8
Chris Hoy; Craig MacLean; Jason Queally	Men's team sprint	44.659; 60.458	2 Q	Slovakia; W 44.659; 60.651	—N/a					France; L 46.680; 60.430	2nd place, silver medalist(s)

Pursuit

Athlete	Event	Qualification		Quarterfinals		Semifinals		Finals	
Athlete	Event	Time	Rank	Opponent Results	Rank	Opponent Results	Rank	Opponent Results	Rank
Rob Hayles	Men's individual pursuit	4:20.996	2 Q	—N/a		Lehmann (GER); L 4:30.080	4 FB	McGee (AUS); L 4:19.613	4
Yvonne McGregor	Women's individual pursuit	3:35.492	3 Q	—N/a		Clignet (FRA); L 3:38.409	3 FB	Ulmer (NZL); W 3:38.850	3rd place, bronze medalist(s)
Paul Manning; Chris Newton; Bryan Steel; Bradley Wiggins	Men's team pursuit	4:04.030 OR	1 Q	Russia; W 4:03.359	1 Q	Ukraine; L 4:02.387	3 FB	France; W 4:01.979	3rd place, bronze medalist(s)

Qualification legend: FA=Gold medal final; FB=Bronze medal final

Keirin

Athlete	Event	1st round	Repechage	2nd round	Final
Athlete	Event	Rank	Rank	Rank	Rank
Chris Hoy	Men's keirin	4 R	DNF	Did not advance	

Time trial

Athlete	Event	Time	Rank
Jason Queally	Men's time trial	1:01.609 OR	1st place, gold medalist(s)

Omnium

Athlete	Event	Points	Laps	Rank
Jon Clay	Men's points race	10	0	13
Emma Davies	Women's points race	0	0	14
Rob Hayles; Bradley Wiggins	Men's madison	13	0	4

=== Mountain biking ===
Athlete	Event	Time	Rank
Oli Beckingsale	Men's cross-country	2:18:17.01	23
Nick Craig	Men's cross-country	2:20:00.27	25
Caroline Alexander	Women's cross-country	1:56:50.62	12
Louise Robinson	Women's cross-country	1:59:23.27	15

== Diving ==
Men

Athlete	Event	Preliminaries		Semifinals				Final			
Athlete	Event	Points	Rank	Points	Rank	Total	Rank	Points	Rank	Total	Rank
Tony Ally	3 m springboard	393.36	10 Q	206.25	15	599.61	12 Q	377.55	12	583.80	12
Mark Shipman	3 m springboard	285.90	46	Did not advance							
Leon Taylor	10 m platform	399.90	16 Q	185.91	8	585.81	13	Did not advance			
Peter Waterfield	10 m platform	317.31	33	Did not advance							
Tony Ally; Mark Shipman	3 m synchronized springboard	—N/a								296.64	7
Leon Taylor; Peter Waterfield	10m synchronized platform	—N/a								335.34	4

Women

Athlete	Event	Preliminaries		Semifinals				Final			
Athlete	Event	Points	Rank	Points	Rank	Total	Rank	Points	Rank	Total	Rank
Jane Smith	3 m springboard	269.22	14 Q	207.90	17	477.12	16	Did not advance			
Karen Smith	3 m springboard	224.58	31	Did not advance							
Sally Freeman	10 m platform	256.17	25	Did not advance							
Lesley Ward	10 m platform	238.65	28	Did not advance							

== Fencing ==
Three fencers, two men and one woman, represented Great Britain in 2000.

Athlete	Event	Round of 64	Round of 32	Round of 16	Quarterfinal	Semifinal	Final / BM	
Athlete	Event	Opposition Score	Opposition Score	Opposition Score	Opposition Score	Opposition Score	Opposition Score	Rank
James Beevers	Men's foil	Martins (BRA); W 15–7	Golubitsky (UKR); L 1–15	Did not advance				
James Williams	Men's sabre	Drajer (ARG); W 15–13	Nemcsik (HUN); W 15–10	Frosin (RUS); L 8–15	Did not advance			
Eloise Smith	Women's foil	Halls (AUS); W 15–8	Trillini (ITA); L 2–15	Did not advance				

== Gymnastics ==
Lisa Mason, Annika Reeder, Emma Williams, Sharna Murray, Kelly Hackman & Paula Thomas represented Great Britain. The Team placed 10th which was the highest placing attained by GBR Women's Artistic Gymnastics at an Olympic Games.

=== Artistic ===
Men

Athlete	Event	Qualification								Final							
Athlete	Event	Apparatus						Total	Rank	Apparatus						Total	Rank
Athlete	Event	F	PH	R	V	PB	HB	Total	Rank	F	PH	R	V	PB	HB	Total	Rank
Craig Heap	All-around	9.137	8.800	9.462	8.825	9.075	9.212	54.511	41	Did not advance							

Women
Team

Athlete	Event	Qualification						Final					
Athlete	Event	Apparatus				Total	Rank	Apparatus				Total	Rank
Athlete	Event	F	V	UB	BB	Total	Rank	F	V	UB	BB	Total	Rank
Kelly Hackman	Team	—N/a	9.262	9.212	8.900	—N/a		Did not advance					
Lisa Mason	Team	9.231	9.350	9.662	9.337	37.580	22 Q	Did not advance					
Sharna Murray	Team	9.056	9.400	9.362	—N/a			Did not advance					
Annika Reeder	Team	9.331	9.437	9.275	9.325	37.368	27 Q	Did not advance					
Paula Thomas	Team	9.337	—N/a		9.475	—N/a		Did not advance					
Emma Williams	Team	9.187	9.262	9.237	9.275	36.961	38 Q	Did not advance					
Total	Team	37.086	37.449	37.536	37.412	149.483	10	Did not advance					

Individual finals

Athlete	Event	Apparatus				Total	Rank
Athlete	Event	F	V	UB	BB	Total	Rank
Lisa Mason	All-around	9.356	9.262	9.537	9.012	37.167	23
Annika Reeder	All-around	7.274	DNF		9.262	16.536	34
Emma Williams	All-around	9.143	9.125	9.050	9.125	36.443	31

=== Trampoline ===
Athlete	Event	Qualification		Final	
Athlete	Event	Score	Rank	Score	Rank
Lee Brearley	Men's	66.20	5 Q	37.90	6
Jaime Moore	Women's	59.90	12	Did not advance	

== Field hockey ==
=== Men's tournament ===
Squad

Head coach: Barry Dancer

1. Simon Mason (GK)
2. David Luckes (GK)
3. Jon Wyatt (c)
4. Julian Halls
5. Tom Bertram
6. Craig Parnham
7. Guy Fordham
8. Ben Sharpe
9. Mark Pearn
10. Jimmy Wallis
11. Brett Garrard
12. Bill Waugh
13. Daniel Hall
14. Michael Johnson
15. Calum Giles
16. David Hacker

Group stage

Pos	Team	Pld	W	D	L	GF	GA	GD	Pts	Qualification
1	Pakistan	5	2	3	0	15	6	+9	9	Semi-finals
2	Netherlands	5	2	2	1	11	8	+3	8	Semi-finals
3	Germany	5	2	2	1	7	6	+1	8	
4	Great Britain	5	1	2	2	8	16	−8	5	
5	Malaysia	5	0	4	1	5	6	−1	4	
6	Canada	5	0	3	2	7	11	−4	3	

Rules for classification: 1) Points; 2) Goal difference; 3) Goals scored; 4) Head-to-head result.

16 September 2000
13:30

Netherlands	4 – 2	Great Britain
de Nooijer 9'; Brinkman 43'; Veen 50', 69'	Report	Pearn 15'; Wallis 46'

Umpires:
Steven Horgan (USA)
Santiago Deo (ESP)

18 September 2000
13:30

Great Britain	1 – 8	Pakistan
Pearn 20'	Report	Abbas 7', 10', 31'; Nadeem 19', 70+'; Bashir 51', 55'; Sarwar 62'

Umpires:
Ray O'Connor (IRL)
Eric Denis (BEL)

20 September 2000
15:30

Malaysia	2 – 2	Great Britain
Nor Saiful 59'; Keevan 66'	Report	Parnham 18'; Pearn 27'

Umpires:
Eduardo Ruiz (ARG)
Donald Prior (AUS)

24 September 2000
19:00

Great Britain	1 – 1	Canada
Hall 44'	Report	Pereira 4'

Umpires:
Eduardo Ruiz (ARG)
Henrik Ehlers (DEN)

26 September 2000
18:30

Germany	1 – 2	Great Britain
Mayerhoefer 37'	Report	Parnham 41'; Giles 65'

Umpires:
Henrik Ehlers (DEN)
John Wright (RSA)

5th–8th classification

Crossover

28 September 2000
09:00

Great Britain	2 – 1	India
Parnham 16'; Giles 46'	Report	Tirkey 10'

Umpires:
Jason McCracken (NZL)
Sumesh Putra (CAN)

5th–6th place final

29 September 2000
14:00

Great Britain	0 – 4	Germany
	Report	Michel 28'; Domke 31'; Bechmann 59'; Weißenborn 63'

Umpires:
Steven Horgan (USA)
Jason McCracken (NZL)

=== Women's tournament ===
Squad

Head coach: Chris Spice

1. Carolyn Reid (GK)
2. Hilary Rose (GK)
3. Kirsty Bowden
4. Jane Smith
6. Melanie Clewlow
7. Christina Cullen
8. Kath Johnson
9. Lucilla Wright
10. Jane Sixsmith
11. Rhona Simpson
12. Denise Marston-Smith
13. Helen Richardson
14. Fiona Greenham
15. Pauline Stott (c)
16. Kate Walsh
17. Mandy Nicholson

Group stage

Pos	Team	Pld	W	D	L	GF	GA	GD	Pts	Qualification
1	Australia	4	3	1	0	9	3	+6	10	Medal round
2	Argentina	4	2	0	2	5	6	−1	6	Medal round
3	Spain	4	1	2	1	2	3	−1	5	Medal round
4	Great Britain	4	1	1	2	5	5	0	4	
5	South Korea	4	0	2	2	4	8	−4	2	

Rules for classification: 1) Points; 2) Goal difference; 3) Goals scored; 4) Head-to-head result.

17 September 2000
15:30

Australia	2 – 1	Great Britain
Hudson 18'; Powell 51'	Report	Marston-Smith 47'

Umpires:
Ute Conen (GER)
Marelize de Klerk (RSA)

18 September 2000
18:30

Great Britain	0 – 1	Argentina
	Report	Masotta 14'

Umpires:
Renee Cohen (NED)
Gina Spitaleri (ITA)

20 September 2000
10:30

South Korea	2 – 2	Great Britain
Kim Seong-Eun 14'; Kim Eun-Jin 48'	Report	Clewlow 57'; Nicholson 66'

Umpires:
Ute Conen (GER)
Jean Buchanan (RSA)

22 September 2000
20:30

Great Britain	2 – 0	Spain
Clewlow 48'; Cullen 65'	Report

Umpires:
Jean Buchanan (RSA)
Marelize de Klerk (RSA)

7th–10th classification

Crossover

25 September 2000
10:30

Great Britain	3 – 2	South Africa
Simpson 3'; Clewlow 12'; Smith 38'	Report	Dare 6'; Coetzee 31'

Umpires:
Renee Chatas (USA)
Angela Lario (ESP)

7th–8th place final

27 September 2000
13:00

Great Britain	0 – 2	Germany
	Report	Keller 21'; Becker 52'

Umpires:
Miriam van Gemert (NED)
Lyn Farrell (NZL)

== Judo ==
Men

Athlete	Event	Round of 32	Round of 16	Quarterfinals	Semifinals	Repechage 1	Repechage 2	Repechage 3	Final / BM	
Athlete	Event	Opposition Result	Opposition Result	Opposition Result	Opposition Result	Opposition Result	Opposition Result	Opposition Result	Opposition Result	Rank
John Buchanan	−60 kg	Peñas (ESP); L 001–011	Did not advance							
David Somerville	−66 kg	Mendoza (ESA); W 100–000	Benboudaoud (FRA); L 0040–0001	Did not advance		Han J-h (KOR); L 1001–0000	Did not advance			
Graeme Randall	−81 kg	Arous (TUN); W 100–000	Sarikhani (IRI); L 0013–0200	Did not advance						

Women

Athlete	Event	Round of 32	Round of 16	Quarterfinals	Semifinals	Repechage 1	Repechage 2	Repechage 3	Final / BM	
Athlete	Event	Opposition Result	Opposition Result	Opposition Result	Opposition Result	Opposition Result	Opposition Result	Opposition Result	Opposition Result	Rank
Victoria Dunn	−48 kg	Kuligina (KGZ); W 0011–0002	Bruletova (RUS); L 000–100	Did not advance		Bye	Savón (CUB); L 0000–0221	Did not advance		
Deborah Allan	−52 kg	León (ESP); L	Did not advance							
Cheryle Peel	−57 kg	Bye	Kusakabe (JPN); L 001–022	Did not advance						
Karen Roberts	−63 kg	Bye	Rodríguez (CUB); W 0001–0000	von Rekowski (GER); L 0000–0000	Did not advance	Bye	Dhahri (TUN); L 101–000	Did not advance		
Kate Howey	−70 kg	Bye	Krukower (ARG); W 0201–0000	Bosch (NED); W 0000–0000	Martín (ESP); W 1001–0000	—N/a			Veranes (CUB); L 0010–0101	2nd place, silver medalist(s)
Chloe Cowen	−78 kg	Laveti (FIJ); W 0200–0000	Richter (ROU); L 0000–1010	Did not advance						
Karina Bryant	+78 kg	Diop (SEN); W 100–000	Cicot (FRA); L 0002–0010	Did not advance						

== Modern pentathlon ==
Athlete	Event	Shooting (10 m air pistol)			Fencing (épée one touch)			Swimming (200 m freestyle)			Riding (show jumping)			Running (3000 m)			Total points	Final rank
Athlete	Event	Points	Rank	MP Points	Results	Rank	MP points	Time	Rank	MP points	Penalties	Rank	MP points	Time	Rank	MP Points	Total points	Final rank
Kate Allenby	Women's	175	12	1036	14–9	5	920	2:20.93	5	1191	60	5	1040	10:58.71	4	1086	5273	3rd place, bronze medalist(s)
Steph Cook	Women's	178	8	1072	10–13	=18	760	2:26.28	12	1138	60	8	1040	10:03.16	1	1308	5318	1st place, gold medalist(s)

== Rowing ==
Men

Athlete	Event	Heats		Repechage		Semifinals		Final	
Athlete	Event	Time	Rank	Time	Rank	Time	Rank	Time	Rank
Matthew Wells	Single sculls	7:07.76	2 R	7:08.19	2 SA/B	7:09.68	5 FB	7:00.22	9
Ed Coode; Greg Searle	Pair	6:42.45	1 SA/B	Bye		6:31.08	2 FA	6:34.38	4
Tom Kay; Tom Middleton	Lightweight double sculls	6:41.74	4 R	6:43.25	3 SC	6:31.08	2 FA	6:32.67	14
James Cracknell; Tim Foster; Matthew Pinsent; Steve Redgrave	Four	6:01.58	1 SA/B	Bye		6:02.28	1 FA	5:56.24	1st place, gold medalist(s)
Louis Attrill; Simon Dennis; Luka Grubor; Ben Hunt-Davis; Andrew Lindsay; Fred Scarlett; Steve Trapmore; Kieran West; Rowley Douglas (cox)	Eight	5:34.47	2 R	5:38.59	1 FA	—N/a		5:33.08	1st place, gold medalist(s)

Women

Athlete	Event	Heats		Repechage		Semifinals		Final	
Athlete	Event	Time	Rank	Time	Rank	Time	Rank	Time	Rank
Alison Mowbray	Single sculls	7:46.73	3 R	7:51.33	1 SA/B	7:52.28	6 FB	7:35.26	10
Dot Blackie; Cath Bishop	Pair	7:40.73	5 R	7:36.53	4 FB	—N/a		7:26.95	9
Frances Houghton; Sarah Winckless	Double sculls	7:24.07	5 R	7:14.03	3 FB	—N/a		7:07.62	9
Guin Batten; Miriam Batten; Katherine Grainger; Gillian Lindsay	Quadruple sculls	6:35.09	2 R	6:30.96	1 FA	—N/a		6:21.64	2nd place, silver medalist(s)
Alex Beever; Rowan Carroll; Lisa Eyre; Elise Laverick; Kate Mackenzie; Ali Sanders; Alison Trickey; Francesca Zino; Charlotte Miller (cox)	Eight	6:19.49	4 R	6:23.46	5	—N/a		Did not advance	7

Qualification Legend: FA=Final A (medal); FB=Final B (non-medal); FC=Final C (non-medal); FD=Final D (non-medal); FE=Final E (non-medal); FF=Final F (non-medal); SA/B=Semifinals A/B; SC/D=Semifinals C/D; SE/F=Semifinals E/F; R=Repechage

== Sailing ==
Great Britain competed in ten of the eleven Sailing events at the Sydney Olympics. They won three gold medals and two silver medals.

Men

Athlete	Event	Race											Net points	Final rank
Athlete	Event	1	2	3	4	5	6	7	8	9	10	11	Net points	Final rank
Nick Dempsey	Mistral	~~37~~; OCS	15	2	~~28~~	19	27	23	9	19	2	9	125	16
Iain Percy	Finn	2	1	9	2	5	8	1	6	1	~~14~~	~~26~~; DNC	35	1st place, gold medalist(s)
Nick Rogers; Jonathan Glanfield	470	4	3	17	1	8	~~18~~	~~19~~	6	6	6	7	58	4

Women

Athlete	Event	Race											Net points	Final rank
Athlete	Event	1	2	3	4	5	6	7	8	9	10	11	Net points	Final rank
Christine Johnston	Mistral	~~25~~	9	26	17	2	18	19	24	19	~~26~~	13	146	18
Shirley Robertson	Europe	4	3	1	6	1	~~13~~	8	9	2	~~16~~	3	37	1st place, gold medalist(s)

Open
Fleet racing

Athlete	Event	Race																Net points	Final rank
Athlete	Event	1	2	3	4	5	6	7	8	9	10	11	12	13	14	15	16	Net points	Final rank
Ben Ainslie	Laser	~~22~~	1	1	3	4	4	10	11	4	4	~~36~~	—N/a					42	1st place, gold medalist(s)
Ian Barker; Simon Hiscocks	49er	~~13~~	5	6	~~10~~	6	2	4	2	9	5	4	4	5	4	1	3	60	2nd place, silver medalist(s)
Hugh Styles; Adam May	Tornado	2	5	3	10	7	6	~~17~~; OCS	~~17~~; DSQ	10	7	3	—N/a					53	6
Ian Walker; Mark Covell	Star	1	~~9~~	~~11~~	7	2	3	2	1	7	9	3	—N/a					35	2nd place, silver medalist(s)

Match racing

Athlete	Event	Qualification races						Total	Rank	Round Robin					Rank	Quarterfinals	Semifinals	Final / BM	Rank
Athlete	Event	1	2	3	4	5	6	Total	Rank	FRA	DEN	SWE	GER	UKR	Rank	Quarterfinals	Semifinals	Final / BM	Rank
Andy Beadsworth; Barry Parkin; Richard Sydenham	Soling	~~13~~	7	8	4	4	13	36	7 Q	L	W	L	L	L	6	Did not advance			

== Shooting ==
Athlete	Event	Qualification		Final		
Athlete	Event	Points	Rank	Points	Total	Rank
Michael Babb	Men's 50 metre rifle prone	592	25	Did not advance		
Peter Boden	Men's trap	108	26	Did not advance		
Ian Peel	Men's trap	118	2 Q	24	142	2nd place, silver medalist(s)
Richard Faulds	Men's double trap	141	4 Q	46	187 (+3)	1st place, gold medalist(s)
John Davison	Men's skeet	120	19	Did not advance		
Drew Harvey	Men's skeet	116	39	Did not advance		

== Swimming ==
Men

Athlete	Events	Heat		Semifinal		Final	
Athlete	Events	Time	Rank	Time	Rank	Time	Rank
Adam Faulkner	1500 m freestyle	15:39.86	29	—N/a		Did not advance	
Mark Foster	50 m freestyle	22.65	14 Q	22.32	6 Q	22.41	7
James Hickman	100 m butterfly	53.48	10 Q	53.55	13	Did not advance	
James Hickman	200 m butterfly	1:57.88	6 Q	1:57.84	10	Did not advance	
Darren Mew	100 m breaststroke	1:02.42	15 Q	1:01.98	15	Did not advance	
Simon Militis	200 m backstroke	2:01.20	19	Did not advance			
Simon Militis	400 m individual medley	4:24.38	24	—N/a		Did not advance	
Paul Palmer	200 m freestyle	1:49.83	11 Q	1:48.79	8 Q	1:47.95	5
Paul Palmer	400 m freestyle	3:51.06	10	—N/a		Did not advance	
Paul Palmer	1500 m freestyle	15:21.09	17	—N/a		Did not advance	
Stephen Parry	200 m butterfly	1:58.00	8 Q	1:57.23	7 Q	1:57.01	6
Adam Ruckwood	100 m backstroke	56.19	16 Q	56.34	16	Did not advance	
Adam Ruckwood	200 m backstroke	2:01.11	18	Did not advance			
James Salter	200 m freestyle	1:48.77	6 Q	1:48.64	6 Q	1:48.74	6
James Salter	400 m freestyle	3:52.01	13	—N/a		Did not advance	
Adam Whitehead	100 m breaststroke	1:02.91	23	Did not advance			
Adam Whitehead	200 m breaststroke	2:17.16	24	—N/a		Did not advance	
Paul Belk; Sion Brinn; Anthony Howard; Mark Stevens	4 × 100 m freestyle relay	3:20.45	9	—N/a		Did not advance	
Andrew Clayton*; Paul Palmer; James Salter; Edward Sinclair; Marc Spackman	4 × 200 m freestyle relay	7:20.69	6 Q	—N/a		7:12.98	5
Sion Brinn; James Hickman; Darren Mew; Neil Willey	4 × 100 m medley relay	3:38.60	4 Q	—N/a		3:40.19	8

Qualifiers for the latter rounds (Q) of all events were decided on a time only basis, therefore positions shown are overall results versus competitors in all heats. * Competed in the heats only

Women

Athlete	Events	Heat		Semifinal		Final	
Athlete	Events	Time	Rank	Time	Rank	Time	Rank
Rebecca Cooke	800 m freestyle	8:43.22	15	—N/a		Did not advance	
Helen Don-Duncan	200 m backstroke	2:14.18	12 Q	2:14.97	15	Did not advance	
Heidi Earp	100 m breaststroke	1:10.56	20	Did not advance			
Kathryn Evans	200 m individual medley	2:19.41	24	Did not advance			
Joanna Fargus	200 m backstroke	2:12.99	7 Q	2:13.57	9	Did not advance	
Jaime King	200 m breaststroke	2:33.10	23	Did not advance			
Georgina Lee	200 m butterfly	2:11.09	11 Q	2:10.33	10	Did not advance	
Karen Legg	200 m freestyle	DNS		Did not advance			
Margie Pedder	100 m butterfly	1:01.53	30	Did not advance			
Margie Pedder	200 m butterfly	2:11.59	15 Q	2:10.49	11	Did not advance	
Karen Pickering	100 m freestyle	56.08	13 Q	55.71	10	Did not advance	
Karen Pickering	200 m freestyle	2:01.42	18	Did not advance			
Sarah Price	100 m backstroke	1:03.22	21	Did not advance			
Sue Rolph	50 m freestyle	26.00	20	Did not advance			
Sue Rolph	100 m freestyle	55.77	8 Q	55.69	9	Did not advance	
Sue Rolph	200 m individual medley	2:16.43	11 Q	2:15.98	12	Did not advance	
Katy Sexton	100 m backstroke	1:02.67	11 Q	1:02.35	10	Did not advance	
Alison Sheppard	50 m freestyle	25.53	9 Q	25.32	5 Q	25.45	7
Rosalind Brett; Karen Pickering; Sue Rolph; Alison Sheppard	4 × 100 m freestyle relay	3:42.47	3 Q	—N/a		3:40.54	5
Janine Belton; Claire Huddart; Nicola Jackson; Karen Legg	4 × 200 m freestyle relay	8:07.41	8 Q	—N/a		8:03.69	6
Heidi Earp; Karen Pickering; Sue Rolph; Katy Sexton	4 × 100 m medley relay	4:07.52	6 Q	—N/a		4:07.61 NR	7

Qualifiers for the latter rounds (Q) of all events were decided on a time only basis, therefore positions shown are overall results versus competitors in all heats.

== Table tennis ==
Athlete	Event	Group stage		Round of 32	Round of 16	Quarterfinals	Semifinals	Final	
Athlete	Event	Opposition Result	Opposition Result	Opposition Result	Opposition Result	Opposition Result	Opposition Result	Opposition Result	Rank
Matthew Syed	Men's singles	Franz (GER); L 0–3	Sahajasein (MRI); W 3–0	Did not advance					

== Taekwondo ==
Athlete	Event	Round of 16	Quarterfinals	Semifinals	Repechage 1	Repechage 2	Final / BM	
Athlete	Event	Opposition Result	Opposition Result	Opposition Result	Opposition Result	Opposition Result	Opposition Result	Rank
Colin Daley	Men's +80 kg	Bye	Trenton (AUS); L 4–8	Did not advance	Thorén (SWE); W 9–2	Gentil (FRA); L 0–3	Did not advance	
Sarah Stevenson	Women's 67 kg	del Real (MEX); W 8–4	Lumin (CHN); W 6–5	Gundersen (NOR); L 2–2+	—N/a	Koskinen (FIN); W 7–4	Okamoto (JPN); L 5–6	4

== Tennis ==
Men

Athlete	Event	Round of 64	Round of 32	Round of 16	Quarterfinals	Semifinals	Final / BM	
Athlete	Event	Opposition Score	Opposition Score	Opposition Score	Opposition Score	Opposition Score	Opposition Score	Rank
Barry Cowan	Singles	Nestor (CAN); L 7–5, 1–6, 4–6	Did not advance					
Tim Henman	Singles	Kučera (SVK); L 3–6, 2–6	Did not advance					
Greg Rusedski	Singles	Clément (FRA); L 2–6, 3–6	Did not advance					
Barry Cowan; Kyle Spencer	Doubles	—N/a	Kafelnikov / Safin (RUS); L 6–7^{(2–7)}, 4–6	Did not advance				

Women

Athlete	Event	Round of 64	Round of 32	Round of 16	Quarterfinals	Semifinals	Final / BM	
Athlete	Event	Opposition Score	Opposition Score	Opposition Score	Opposition Score	Opposition Score	Opposition Score	Rank
Julie Pullin; Lorna Woodroffe	Doubles	—N/a	Boogert / Oremans (NED); L 2–6, 1–6	Did not advance				

== Triathlon ==
The three British triathletes that finished the inaugural Olympic triathlon placed highly, with none lower than fifteenth place and two in the top ten. However, three more British athletes did not finish the competition.

Athlete	Event	Swim (1.5 km)	Bike (40 km)	Run (10 km)	Total Time	Rank
Tim Don	Men's	18:00.59	59:31.11	31:57.15	1:49:28.85	10
Andrew Johns	Men's	18:15.69	DNF			
Simon Lessing	Men's	17:44.79	59:39.60	31:59.93	1:49:24.32	9
Sian Brice	Women's	20:26.78	DNF			
Michelle Dillon	Women's	21:01.08	DNF			
Stephanie Forrester	Women's	21:12.18	1:08:20.90	34:23.03	2:03:56.11	15

== Weightlifting ==
Athlete	Event	Snatch		Clean & jerk		Total	Rank
Athlete	Event	Result	Rank	Result	Rank	Total	Rank
Thomas Yule	Men's −105 kg	~~155~~	DNF	—	—	—	DNF

== See also ==
- Great Britain at the Olympics
- Great Britain at the 2000 Summer Paralympics

== Notes ==
- Wallechinsky, David (2004). The Complete Book of the Summer Olympics (Athens 2004 Edition). Toronto, Canada. ISBN 1-894963-32-6.
- International Olympic Committee (2001). The Results. Retrieved 12 November 2005.
- Sydney Organising Committee for the Olympic Games (2001). Official Report of the XXVII Olympiad Volume 1: Preparing for the Games. Retrieved 20 November 2005.
- Sydney Organising Committee for the Olympic Games (2001). Official Report of the XXVII Olympiad Volume 2: Celebrating the Games. Retrieved 20 November 2005.
- Sydney Organising Committee for the Olympic Games (2001). The Results. Retrieved 20 November 2005.
- International Olympic Committee Web Site
- Gymnastics Results
