= Paul Thompson (rower) =

Australian rowing coach

Personal information
- Nationality: Australian
- Born: 15 March 1964 (age 62) Canberra, Australia

Sport
- Country: Australia
- Sport: Rowing
- Club: Mercantile Rowing Club; Torrens Rowing Club
- Now coaching: British Rowing

Achievements and titles
- World finals: Juniors 1982; U23 1985
- National finals: Kings Cup 1987, 1988
Medal record
Representing Australia
Men's rowing
World Rowing U23 Championships
| Silver medal – second place | U23 1985 Banyoles | M8+ |

Paul Anthony Thompson MBE (born 15 March 1964, Canberra) is an Australian elite level rowing coach and former rower. As a rower he was an Australian under-age champion, won a silver medal at the 1985 U23 World Championships and rowed in senior King's Cup eights for both South Australia and New South Wales. He has coached Australian and British crews to World Championship titles and Olympic medals including taking Kate Slatter and Megan Still to Australia's first women's Olympic rowing gold at Atlanta 1996. By 2012 he was Great Britain's head coach for women and lightweights and took British crews to three gold and two silver medals at London 2012. Since 2022 he has been Rowing Australia's High Performance Director.

== Australian state and representative rowing ==
Thompson first rowed at the Australian Rowing Championships in 1982 as a schoolboy contesting and winning the national U19 coxless pair title with James Galloway and representing Narrabundah College, ACT. The following year he and Galloway contested the U23 coxless pair title in the colours of the ACT Rowing Association.

Thompson was first selected to represent Australia at the 1982 Junior World Rowing Championships where he raced a coxless pair with James Galloway to fourth place. In 1984 and again in 1985 he was selected in the Australian U23 men's eight for their Trans-Tasman match series against New Zealand. In 1985, that Australian U23 men's eight with Thompson in the four seat rowed to a silver medal at the World Rowing U23 Championships in Banyoles.

Thompson's senior club rowing was firstly from the Mercantile Rowing Club in Melbourne and then the Torrens Rowing Club in Adelaide.

He contested the national coxed four title at the Australian Rowing Championships in 1985 in Mercantile colours. By 1986 he had won a scholarship to the Australian Institute of Sports and that year rowing in an AIS crew but in his Torrens RC colours, he again contested the national coxed four title. He contested the coxless pair and coxless four titles in 1987 rowing for Torrens and in 1988 in ACT Rowing Association colours.

In 1987 Thompson was seated in three Torrens Rowing Club crews which won South Australian state titles - the eight, coxless four and the coxless pair. He made state selection for South Australia that year in the men's eight contesting the 1987 King's Cup at the Interstate Regatta within the Australian Rowing Championships. The following year, qualifying through his ACT residency he rowed in the 1988 New South Wales men's King's Cup eight which placed third.

== Australian coaching career ==
Thompson's first win as a coach was in 1985 when he coached the University of Melbourne Queen's College crew to victory in the Intercollege Rowing Championship with co-coach Ben Killerby. Later, while training at the Australian Institute of Sports in 1988 Thompson suffered a bike accident which ended his rowing career. He took to coaching immediately and the following year he co-coached with Reinhold Batschi, four AIS men's crews to victory at the Australian Championships.

Thompson became in demand as a coach of women's squads. Between 1993 and 1998 he coached state representative women's coxless fours contesting the premier race for women at the annual Interstate Regatta within the Australian Rowing Championships. Firstly he coached New South Wales crews, then ACT and then in 1998 he took the Victorian women's crew to victory. He took Australian women's sweep crews to every World Rowing Championships from 1991 to 1999 and on three occasions was responsible for all three sweep-oared boat classes. He coached Kate Slatter and Megan Still to a world championship title in a coxless pair in Tampere in 1995 and the following year to Olympic gold in Atlanta. He was still coaching Slatter in 2000 when at the Sydney Olympics she and Rachael Taylor rowed to a silver medal in the coxless pair.

After his 2018 departure from British Rowing, Thompson re-engaged with Rowing Australia and by the time of the 2022 World Rowing Championships in Racize, Thompson was Rowing Australia's High Performance Director.

== British coaching career ==
Thompson joined the British Rowing coaching staff in 2001 and was the lead coach for women at the 2004 Olympics in Athens.

He coached Great Britain's Katherine Grainger for 12 years, from his arrival in the UK until the London 2012 Olympics, where she and Anna Watkins won gold. As Great Britain's head coach for women and lightweights, Thompson was responsible for three gold and two silver medals at London 2012.

In 2016 Thompson was accused by British rower Emily Taylor of being a "massive bully" and creating a culture of fear in the British women's selection squad. Taylor had lost her seat in the British women's eight to another rower two months out from London 2012. Rower Rick Eglington, the boyfriend of Vicky Thornley who was also coached by Thompson, accused him of being “overbearing” and alleged he “caused unnecessary stress to his top athlete”. After an inquiry by British Rowing, Thompson was cleared in Feb 2017 of the bullying complaint and continued in his role as the chief coach for women and lightweights. In December 2018 Thompson's departure from British Rowing was announced.

== Accolades ==
Thompson was appointed Member of the Order of the British Empire (MBE) in the 2013 New Year Honours for services to rowing and the London 2012 Olympic and Paralympic Games.

In 2013 his alma mater, the University of Canberra acknowledged him with the 2013 Distinguished Alumni Award for the Faculty of Health. He had graduated from that institution in 1990 with a B. App Science in Health Education.

In 2017 he was inducted to the Australian Capital Territory Sport Hall of Fame and he was the inaugural inductee to the University of Canberra's Sport Walk of Fame in 2022.

== Coaching palmares ==
=== Australian Rowing Championships coach ===
- 1989 Australian Institute of Sport men's sweep crews: coxless pairs (first and second), coxed pair (first), coxless four (first), coxed four (first).

=== Australian Interstate Regatta coach ===
- 1993 New South Wales women's coxless four for ULVA Trophy - second
- 1995 New South Wales women's coxless four for ULVA Trophy - third
- 1996 ACT women's coxless four for ULVA Trophy - fourth
- 1997 ACT women's coxless four for ULVA Trophy - second
- 1998 Victorian women's coxless four for ULVA Trophy - first

=== World Rowing Championships coach ===
- 1991 Austria All Australian women's sweep crews: eight, coxless four, coxless pair
- 1993 Roundnice Australian women's coxless four - sixth
- 1994 Indianapolis All Australian women's sweep crews: eight, coxless four - bronze, coxless pair - bronze
- 1995 Tampere All Australian women's sweep crews: eight, coxless four, coxless pair - gold (Slatter and Still)
- 1997 Aiguebelette Australian women's coxless pair - fourth
- 1998 Cologne Both Australian women's sweep crews: eight - fourth, coxless pair - seventh
- 1999 St Catharines Australian women's coxless pair - bronze (Slatter and Taylor)
- 2022 Racize Australia's High Performance Director - 4 x team silver medals and 4 x bronze.
- 2023 Belgrade Australia's High Performance Director

=== Olympics coach ===
- 1992 Barcelona Olympics Australian women's coxless four - sixth
- 1996 Atlanta Olympics Australian women's coxless pair - gold (Slatter and Still)
- 2000 Sydney Olympics Australian women's coxless pair - silver (Slatter and Taylor)
- 2004 Athens Olympics British women's quad scull - silver (Mowbray, Flood, Houghton, Romero) and coxless pair - silver (Grainger and Bishop)
- 2008 Beijing Olympics British women's quad scull - silver (Vernon, Flood, Houghton, Grainger)
- 2012 London Olympics British women's double scull - gold (Grainger and Watkins)
- 2016 Rio Olympics British women's double scull - silver (Grainger and Thornley)

=== Other ===
- 1994 Commonwealth Games All Australian women's sweep crews : eight - silver, coxless four - silver, coxless pair - gold (Ozolins and Klomp)
