= Laib =

Laib is a surname. Notable people with the surname include:

- Andreas Laib (born 1972), German rower
- Paul Laib (1869–1958), British photographer
- Wolfgang Laib (born 1950), German artist

== See also ==
- Lail
