= 1998 World Rowing Championships =

International rowing event

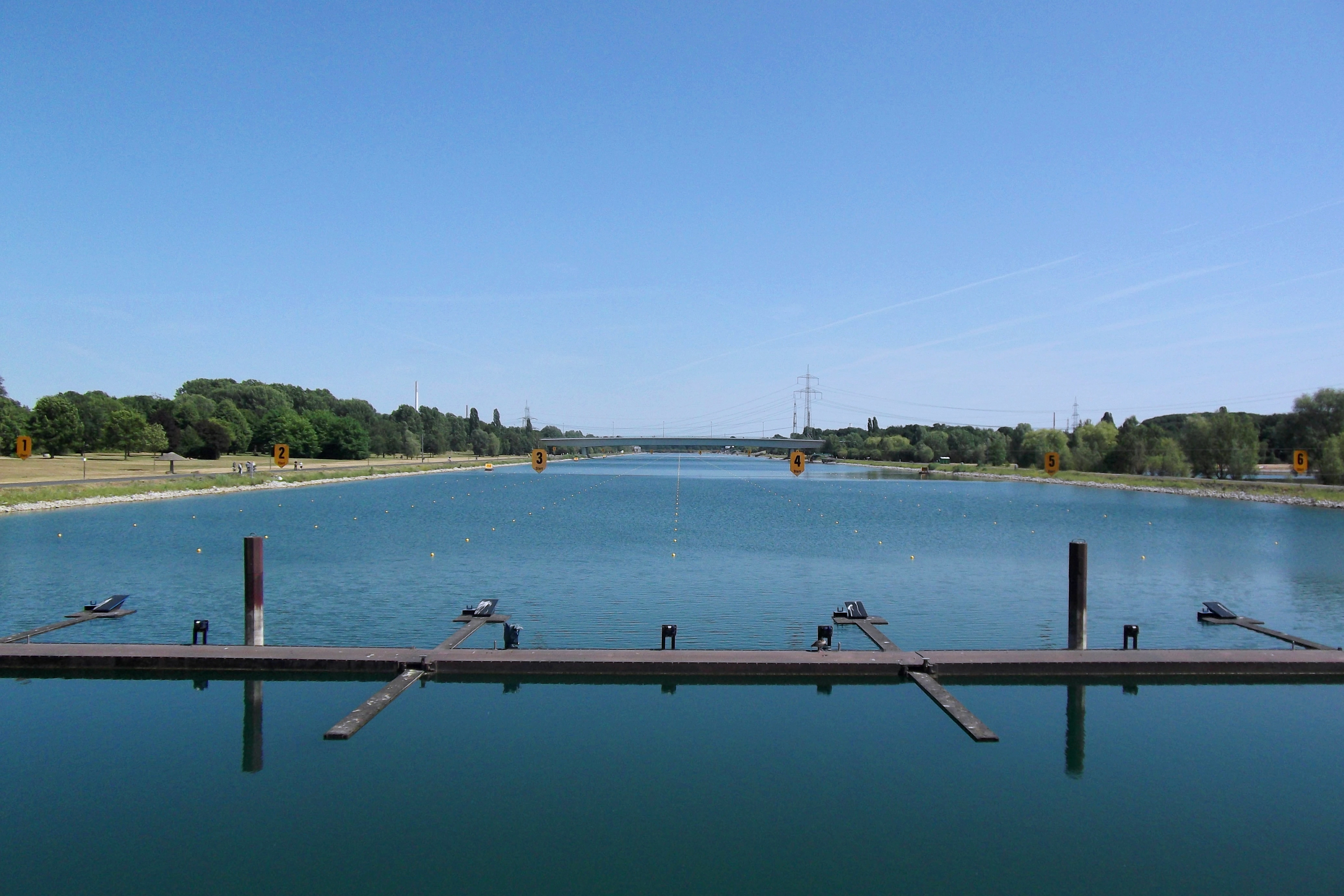
- The regatta course at Fühlinger See
- Venue: Fühlinger See
- Location: Cologne, Germany
- Dates: 9 to 18 September

The 1998 World Rowing Championships were World Rowing Championships that were held from 9 to 18 September 1998 in Cologne, Germany. The World Rowing Championships are organized by FISA, back then International Rowing Federation (since renamed to the World Rowing Federation).

== Medal summary ==
=== Men's events ===
Event	Gold	Time	Silver	Time	Bronze	Time
M1x	New Zealand; Rob Waddell	6:39.65	Switzerland; Xeno Müller	6:41.55	Czech Republic; Václav Chalupa	6:43.89
M2x	Germany; Andreas Hajek; Stephan Volkert	6:13.20	Norway; Steffen Størseth; Kjetil Undset	6:14.49	Poland; Marek Kolbowicz; Adam Korol	6:15.50
M4x	Italy; Agostino Abbagnale; Alessandro Corona; Rossano Galtarossa; Alessio Sartori	5:51.19	Germany; Marco Geisler; Marcel Hacker; Sebastian Mayer; Stefan Roehnert	5:56.13	Austria; Raphael Hartl; Norbert Lambing; Andreas Nader; Horst Nußbaumer	5:57.91
M2+	Australia; Nick Green; James Tomkins; Brett Hayman (c)	6:45.01	Italy; Gioacchino Cascone; Rosario Gioia; Gianluca Barattolo (c)	6:47.71	United States; Nicholas Anderson; Kurt Borcherding; Phil Henry (c)	6:50.06
M2-	Germany; Detlef Kirchhoff; Robert Sens	6:22.32	Australia; Drew Ginn; Mike McKay	6:24.23	Yugoslavia; Nikola Stojić; Đorđe Višacki	6:25.52
M4+	Australia; Drew Ginn; Nick Green; Mike McKay; James Tomkins; Brett Hayman (c)	6:09.43	Croatia; Denis Boban; Igor Boraska; Tihomir Franković; Siniša Skelin; Ratko Cvitanić (c)	6:12.97	Italy; Marco Bizzozero; Dario Lari; Giuseppe Musemeci; Pasquale Panzarino; Daniele Sorice (c)	6:13.59
M4-	Great Britain; James Cracknell; Tim Foster; Matthew Pinsent; Steve Redgrave	5:48.06	France; Gilles Bosquet; Daniel Fauché; François Meurillon; Anthony Perrot	5:49.44	Italy; Lorenzo Carboncini; Riccardo Dei Rossi; Valter Molea; Carlo Mornati	5:49.46
M8+	United States; Chris Ahrens; Porter Collins; Robert Kaehler; Jeffrey Klepacki; Garrett Miller; Bryan Volpenhein; Tom Welsh; Michael Wherley; Peter Cipollone (c)	5:38.78	Germany; Jörg Dießner; Stefan Forster; Stefan Heinze; Kai Horl; Thomas Jung; Ike Landvoigt; Enrico Schnabel; Marc Weber; Peter Thiede (c)	5:39.48	Romania; Dorin Alupei; Andrei Bănică; Cornel Nemțoc; Gheorghe Pîrvan; Nicolae Țaga; Viorel Talapan; Valentin Robu; Florian Tudor; Dumitru Răducanu (c)	5:40.27
Men's lightweight events
LM1x	Italy; Stefano Basalini	6:48.90	Czech Republic; Michal Vabroušek	6:50.98	Denmark; Karsten Nielsen	6:51.52
LM2x	Poland; Tomasz Kucharski; Robert Sycz	6:19.11	Italy; Michelangelo Crispi; Leonardo Pettinari	6:21.02	Switzerland; Markus Gier; Michael Gier	6:22.35
LM4x	Italy; Lorenzo Bertini; Elia Luini; Paolo Pittino; Franco Sancassani	5:57.68	Germany; Markus Baumann; Alexander Lutz; Franz Mayer; Christian Von Gyldenfeldt	5:58.59	United States; Conal Groom; Sean Groom; Ransom Weaver; Coop Wessels	6:02.74
LM2-	France; Jean-Christophe Bette; Vincent Montabonel	6:40.53	Italy; Catello Amarante; Carlo Gaddi	6:41.75	Chile; Miguel Cerda; Christián Yantani	6:44.00
LM4-	Denmark; Eskild Ebbesen; Thomas Ebert; Victor Feddersen; Thomas Poulsen	6:01.53	France; Xavier Dorfman; Yves Hocdé; Frederic Pinon; Laurent Porchier	6:02.37	Australia; Darren Balmforth; Simon Burgess; Anthony Edwards; Robert Richards	6:04.43
LM8+	Germany; Matthias Edeler; Oliver Ibielski; Andreas Laib; Stefan Locher; Daniel Rosenberger; Bernhard Stomporowski; Manuel Strauch; Vladimir Vukelic; Olaf Kaska (c)	5:36.28	United States; Michael Altmann; William Carlucci; John Cashman; Eric Gillett; Sean Kammann; William Plifka; Martin Schwartz; Andrea Trento; Sean Mulligan (c)	5:36.56	Italy; Antonello Aliberti; Carlo Artico; Filippo Dodero; Daniele Gilardoni; Andrea Lupini; Giuseppe Manzo; Salvatore Messina; Massimo Guglielmi; Antonio Cirillo (c)	5:37.06

=== Women's events ===
Event:	Gold:	Time	Silver:	Time	Bronze:	Time
W1x	Russia; Irina Fedotova	7:25.09	Germany; Katrin Rutschow	7:26.67	Sweden; Maria Brandin	7:30.99
W2x	Great Britain; Miriam Batten; Gillian Lindsay	6:48.85	Netherlands; Pieta van Dishoeck; Eeke van Nes	6:49.75	Romania; Doina Ignat; Ioana Olteanu	6:50.49
W4x	Germany; Kathrin Boron; Manuela Lutze; Jana Thieme; Christiane Will	6:24.38	Russia; Oksana Dorodnova; Yuliya Levina; Larisa Merk; Inna Moiseeva	6:26.66	Australia; Marina Hatzakis; Sally Newmarch; Jane Robinson; Bronwyn Roye	6:32.11
W2-	Canada; Alison Korn; Emma Robinson	7:05.19	Great Britain; Catherine Bishop; Dot Blackie	7:08.12	United States; Amy Martin; Linda Miller	7:08.76
W4-	Ukraine; Yevheniya Andrieieva; Tatyana Fesenko; Nina Proskura; Tetyana Savchenko	6:30.63	Canada; Buffy-Lynne Williams; Laryssa Biesenthal; Marnie McBean; Kubet Weston	6:31.90	Netherlands; Tessa Zwolle-Appeldoorn; Nelleke Penninx; Carin ter Beek; Christine Vink	6:32.73
W8+	Romania; Angela Cazac; Veronica Cochela; Georgeta Damian; Maria Magdalena Dumitrache; Liliana Gafencu; Doina Ignat; Ioana Olteanu; Viorica Susanu; Elena Georgescu (c)	6:14.62	United States; Jennifer Dore-Terhaar; Torrey Folk; Amy Fuller; Sarah Jones; Katie Maloney; Lianne Nelson-Bennion; Sally Scovel; Wendy Wilbur; Rajanya Shah (c)	6:15.81	Canada; Buffy-Lynne Williams; Laryssa Biesenthal; Heather Davis; Alison Korn; Marnie McBean; Emma Robinson; Dorota Urbaniak; Kubet Weston; Lesley Thompson-Willie (c)	6:18.25
Women's lightweight events
LW1x	Switzerland; Pia Vogel	7:41.01	France; Bénédicte Dorfman-Luzuy	7:42.01	Argentina; María Garisoain	7:44.40
LW2x	United States; Christine Collins; Sarah Garner	7:03.73	Germany; Claudia Blasberg; Karin Stephan	7:06.53	Romania; Angela Alupei-Tamas; Camelia Macoviviuc	7:09.45
LW4x	Germany; Nicole Faust; Anna Kleinz; Christine Morawitz; Valerie Viehoff	6:40.99	United States; Cassandra Cunningham; Sara Den Besten; Terry Paige Lisa Schlenker	6:42.97	Greece; Chrysi Biskitzi; Angeliki Gremou; Evangelia Kokkinou; Irini Zora	6:43.27
LW2-	Great Britain; Juliet Machan; Jo Nitsch	7:29.42	Argentina; Patricia Conte; Ana Urbano	7:32.51	United States; Michelle Borkhuis; Linda Muri	7:37.50

== Medal table ==
Place	Nation	1st place, gold medalist(s)	2nd place, silver medalist(s)	3rd place, bronze medalist(s)	Total
1	Germany	5	5	0	10
2	Italy	3	3	3	9
3	Great Britain	3	1	0	4
4	United States	2	2	4	8
5	Australia	2	1	2	5
6	France	1	3	0	4
7	Romania	1	1	3	5
8	Switzerland	1	1	1	3
8	Canada	1	1	1	3
10	Russia	1	1	0	2
11	Poland	1	0	1	2
11	Denmark	1	0	1	2
13	New Zealand	1	0	0	1
13	Ukraine	1	0	0	1
15	Czech Republic	0	1	1	2
15	Netherlands	0	1	1	2
15	Argentina	0	1	1	2
18	Croatia	0	1	0	1
18	Norway	0	1	0	1
20	Chile	0	0	1	1
20	Greece	0	0	1	1
20	Sweden	0	0	1	1
20	Yugoslavia	0	0	1	1
20	Austria	0	0	1	1
Total		24	24	24	72
