= Rachael Taylor (rower) =

Australian rower

Racheal Taylor
Personal information
- Born: 6 May 1976 (age 50)

Sport
- Sport: Rowing
- Club: Ballarat City Rowing Club; Melbourne Uni Boat Club; Powerhouse Rowing Club
Medal record
Women's rowing
Representing Australia
Olympic Games
| Silver medal – second place | 2000 Sydney | Coxless pair |
World Rowing Championships
| Silver medal – second place | 2002 Seville | W8+ |
| Bronze medal – third place | 1999 St. Catharines | W2- |

Rachael Taylor (born 6 May 1976 in Ballarat) is an Australian former rower - a national champion and an Olympic and world championship medalist.

== Club and state rowing ==
Taylor's senior rowing was initially from the Ballarat City Rowing club in her home town. After relocating to Melbourne she rowed from the Melbourne University Boat Club and during her Australian representative years from the Powerhouse Rowing Club in Melbourne.

State selection for Taylor first came in 1995 in the Victorian youth eight to contest the Bicentennial Cup at the Interstate regatta within the Australian Rowing Championships. In 1997 she was selected to the Victorian senior women's heavyweight crew which was until 1999 competing in coxless fours. She raced for and won the ULVA Trophy for Victoria in 1997 and 1998 and then was in the first Victorian state women's eight who contested and also won the ULVA Trophy in 1999. She rowed in another Victorian eights victory in 2000. By 2002 the Interstate eights were racing for the Queen's Cup and Taylor contested the 2002 Queen's Cup for Victoria finishing second.

Taylor contested national titles at the Australian Rowing Championships on a number of occasions. In 2000 wearing Powerhouse Rowing Club colours she won the national coxless pairs championship title with Kate Slatter in an Australian record time. In 2000 she also won the national open women's coxless four title.

== International representative rowing ==
Taylor's first Australian representative selection came at age eighteen when selected with Sarah Coconis to compete in a coxless pair at the 1994 World Rowing U23 Championships in Vaires Sur Marne, France. They did not make the final and finished in overall seventh place. That same year Taylor and Coconis raced the pair at the 1994 World Junior Rowing Championships in Munich to fifth place.

Taylor's senior selection debut came in 1997 when with Bronwyn Thompson she rowed the coxless pair to a fourth placing at the 1997 World Rowing Championships in Aiguebelette, France after having raced at two World Rowing Cups in Europe that season. In 1998 Taylor competed in the Australian pair, four and eight at two World Rowing Cups in Europe and then in the eight to a fourth placing at Cologne 1998.

By 1999 Kate Slatter was Australia's prominent sweep oared female rower having won both world and Olympic championships in 1995 and 1996 in the coxless pair. Her partner Megan Marcks had retired and Slatter was looking for a new pairs partner for a 2000 Olympic campaign. Slatter and Taylor came together in the coxless pair. They raced at a World Rowing Cup and then at the 1999 World Rowing Championships in St Catharines to a bronze medal. In the 2000 Olympic year they raced with success at two World Rowing Cups in Europe before coming to Sydney. At the Sydney 2000 Olympics they placed second in their heat, won their repechage and placed second behind the Romanians in the Olympic final, beating out the US pair for the silver medal by 4/100ths of a second.

Taylor continued rowing at the highest level post-Olympics. She raced in both the coxless four and the Australian eight at two World Rowing Cups in Europe and secured the five seat in the eight for the 2002 World Rowing Championships in Seville Spain where they rowed to a silver medal.
