= Raj Shah (disambiguation) =

Raj Shah is an American political aide who served as White House Deputy Press Secretary during the Trump administration.

Raj Shah may also refer to:

- Rajiv Shah (born 1973), American health economist and president of the Rockefeller Foundation
- Rajanya Shah (1974), American rower
