= Daniel Rosenberger =

German rower

Personal information
- Born: 5 April 1972 (age 54)

Sport
- Sport: Rowing
Medal record
Men's rowing
Representing Germany
World Rowing Championships
Gold medal – first place	1998 Cologne	Lwt eight

Daniel Rosenberger (born 5 April 1972) is a German lightweight rower. He won a gold medal at the 1998 World Rowing Championships in Cologne with the lightweight men's eight.
