= Olga Tratsevskaya =

Belarusian rower (born 1975)

Medal record

Women's rowing

Representing Belarus

World Rowing Championships
Gold medal – first place	1999 St. Catharines	W4-
Gold medal – first place	2000 Zagreb	W4-
Silver medal – second place	2001 Lucerne	W2-

Olga Tratsevskaya (Belarusian: Ольга Трацевская; born 25 March 1975 in Minsk) is a Belarusian rower. She finished 4th in the women's eight at the 2000 Summer Olympics.
