= Rachael Kininmonth =

Australian rower

Personal information
- Born: 16 December 1967 (age 57); Perth, Western Australia
- Height: 175 cm (5 ft 9 in)
- Weight: 70 kg (154 lb)

Sport
- Country: Australia
- Sport: Rowing

Rachael Kininmonth (born 16 December 1967 in Perth, Western Australia) is an Australian rower who competed in the women's eight at the 2000 Summer Olympics.
