= Inna Moiseeva =

Russian rower

Medal record

Representing Russia

Women's Rowing
Silver medal – second place	1998 Cologne	W4x

Inna Moiseeva (Moisseyeva, Russian: Инна Моисеева; born 17 February 1971) is a Russian rower.

== Biography ==
Inna Moiseeva was born on 17 February 1971 in Moscow. She graduated from Moscow State Academy of Physical Culture.

Member of the Russian team in rowing since 1992. Member of three world championships. In 1998 she became the vice-champion in the race of fours without the helmsman. Prizewinner of the World Cup stages.

Lives in Moscow.
