= Emily Taylor (rower) =

British rower

Medal record

Women's rowing

Representing Great Britain

European Championships
Silver medal – second place	2008 Marathon	W8+

Emily Taylor (born 28 June 1987) is a British former rower. She won a silver medal in the women's eight at the 2008 European Rowing Championships.

== Rowing career ==
Born in Lincoln and raised in nearby Heighington, Taylor took up rowing while studying at Durham University, after encountering a fellow student who was recruiting members for the university rowing club. Within two years she had won her first international medal, taking bronze in the women's coxless four at the 2007 World Rowing U23 Championships.

Taylor was selected as a spare for the British women's eight at the 2008 Summer Olympics in Beijing. Later that year, she was part of the British crew that won the silver medal in the women's eight at the 2008 European Rowing Championships.

In 2016, Taylor was among a number of former British rowers who publicly criticised women's head coach Paul Thompson, alleging that he had created a "culture of fear" within the national training squad. The allegations prompted British Rowing to conduct an internal review.
