= Maria Magdalena Dumitrache =

Romanian rower (born 1977)

Maria Dumitrache
Personal information
- Full name: Maria Magdalena Dumitrache
- Born: 3 May 1977 (age 49) Târgoviște, Dâmbovița. Romania

Sport
- Sport: Rowing
Medal record
Women's rowing
Representing Romania
Olympic Games
Gold medal – first place	2000 Sydney	Eight
World Championships
Gold medal – first place	1998 Cologne	Eight
Gold medal – first place	1999 St. Catharines	Eight

Maria Magdalena Dumitrache (born 3 May 1977) is a Romanian rower, who won gold at the 2000 Summer Olympics. She first competed as an elite rower at the 1998 World Rowing Championships where she came fifth with the women's four, and won gold with the women's eight. She retained the world championship title at the 1999 World Rowing Championships. She retired after competing in a 2001 World Rowing Cup race.
