= Victoria Toogood =

Australian rower

Personal information
- Nickname: Tory

Sport
- Country: Australia
- Sport: Rowing
- Club: Torrens Rowing Club
Medal record
Women's rowing
Representing Australia
World Rowing Championships
Silver medal – second place	1993 Racice	W2-
Bronze medal – third place	1994 Indianapolis	W4-
Junior World Rowing Championships
Gold medal – first place	1992 Montreal	W2-

Victoria Toogood is an Australian former rower. She was a national champion, a junior world champion and a medalist at World Championships.

== Club and state rowing ==
Toogood's senior club rowing was in Adelaide from the Torrens Rowing Club and Riverside Rowing Club.

Toogood first made South Australian state representation in 1991 in the youth four with Kate Slatter which contested and won the Bicentennial Cup at the Interstate Regatta within the Australian Rowing Championships. The following year she again rowed in the South Australian youth four and was joined by Alison Davies.

In 1993 Toogood was selected in the South Australian women's senior four to compete for the ULVA Trophy at the Interstate Regatta. In 1994 she stroked the South Australian four with Davies and Anna Ozolins to an ULVA Trophy victory. She was again in that boat in 1995 (second) and 1996 (first place).

== International representative rowing ==
Tory made her Australian representative debut in a coxless pair at the 1992 Junior World Rowing Championships in Montreal, where she rowed to first place and a world junior title with her South Australian teammate Alison Davies.

She made the Australian senior squad for the 1993 World Rowing Championships, and again raced the pair with Davies and won silver. The following year at Indianapolis 1994 she was selected at stroke in the W4- and won the bronze medal with Davies, Kate Slatter and Megan Still. She also rowed in the five set of the Australian women's eight at those championships and placed sixth.

For Tampere 1995 - Toogood's last Australian representative appearance - she was selected in Australian women's eight. That boat finished in overall eighth place.
