= Jodi Winter =

Australian rower

Personal information
- Born: 28 June 1976 (age 50)
- Years active: 1996–2004

Sport
- Sport: Rowing
- Club: Nepean Rowing Club
Medal record
Women's rowing
Representing Australia
World Rowing Championships
Gold medal – first place	2001 Lucerne	W8+
Gold medal – first place	2002 Seville	W4-
Silver medal – second place	2002 Seville	W8+
World Rowing U23 Championships
Gold medal – first place	1997 Milan	W4-

Jodi Winter (born 28 June 1976 in Sydney) is an Australian rower, a two-time World Champion and a dual Olympian.

== Club and state rowing ==
Winter came from a sporting family and her father had represented Australia in sailing at Olympic level. She had aspirations to be a kayaker and was spotted in a New South Wales Institute of Sports rowing talent identification program. Her early rowing training was undertaken at the NSWIS on Narrabeen Lakes where she developed her skills before being receiving support from the Australian Institute of Sport (AIS). Her senior club membership was with the Nepean Rowing Club.

Winter rowed in state representative fours (in 1998) and then eights for New South Wales contesting the Interstate women's eight championships for the ULVA Trophy and later the Queen Elizabeth II Cup. She represented her state each year from 1998 to 2004, as stroke in 1999. In the bow seat she was first rower across the line in the New South Wales victories of 2002, 2003 and 2004.

== International representative rowing ==
=== World Championships ===
Winter made her international representative debut in 1996, at the World Rowing U23 Championships in Hazewinkel, Belgium, rowing in a coxless pair with Kathleen Burke. They placed fourth. The following year at the U23 World Championships in Milan she raced in Australia's coxless four with Burke, Sarah Chibnall and with Kristina Larsen with whom she would share later career success. They led from the start and extended their 1 sec lead at the 500 m to be 2.4 secs at the 1500 m mark. The field came back over the closing stages but the Australian four held on and won the 1997 U23 World Championship.

In 1998 Winter was first selected in Australian senior crews and she raced in a coxless pair and in the eight at two World Rowing Cups in Europe and at the 1998 World Rowing Championships. At those World Championships in Cologne she placed seventh in the pair with Anna Ozlins and fourth in the eight. For St. Catharines 1999 Winter rowed in the three seat of the Australian women's eight who placed fifth.

Winter was selected in the Australian squad for the 2001 international tour. In their first competitive outing of the 2001 season, racing as an Australian Institute of Sport selection eight at Henley Royal Regatta, Winter won the 2001 Henley Prize for women's eights (from 2002 this event was renamed the Remenham Challenge Cup). Winter raced in two Australian senior crews at the World Rowing Cup IV regatta in Munich, Germany. In a coxless pair with Rebecca Sattin she placed sixth while the Australian eight placed second and were on track for possible World Championship success. A month later at the 2001 World Rowing Championships in Lucerne, Winter was in the bow seat of the Australian women's heavyweight crew who won Australia's first ever women's eight World Championship title.

The Australian women's eight stayed together into 2002 with just one seat change. Their European campaign ahead of the World Championships saw them take a bronze medal at the Rowing World Cup II in Lucerne and silver at the Rowing World Cup III in Munich. Winter raced in a double scull with Sattin in Lucerne and in a coxless four who placed third (with the other half of the eight winning) at Munich. At the 2002 World Championships in Seville Spain, the Australian eight won their heat but were beaten out by the USA by 0.45 seconds in the final. With Winter at bow the Australians just held out the Germans and she won her second World Championship placing – a silver. As in 2001, four members of the eight including Winter also doubled up in the coxless four to defend Australia's title. At Seville 2002 with Kristina Larsen in the bow, Victoria Roberts at stroke and Rebecca Sattin and Winter in the engine room, the Australian women won their heat and beat Canada in the final to claim another World Championship title – Winter's second.

Winter was again in elite Australian crew contention in 2003. She raced in a coxless four and the eight at the World Rowing Cup III in Lucerne and secured her place in the eight for the 2003 World Rowing Championships in Milan. With Winter in the three seat the eight placed fourth.

=== Olympics ===
In 2000 she made the Australian women's eight who won bronze at two World Rowing Cups in the lead up to the Olympics. For the 2000 Sydney Olympics she rowed at three in the eight who had a credible fifth placing in the final.

Ahead of the 2004 Olympics Winter rowed in the eight in the preparation race at the World Rowing Cup III in Lucerne. In Athens she was seated at two in the Australia's women's eight. In the Olympic final, the crew were fighting for a bronze medal when in the third 500 m Sally Robbins seated at six began to lose consciousness. With 400 metres to go Robbins collapsed, lying back onto Julia Wilson's runners and preventing Julia from coming forward to take a stroke. The Australian eight finished sixth and last in the final and post-regatta, endured a higher level of scrutiny and enquiry than any previous Australian rowing representatives. It was Winter's, Wilson's and Robbins' last Australian representative appearance.
