= Irina Bazilevskaya =

Belarusian rower (born 1970)

Personal information
- Nationality: Belarusian
- Born: 11 August 1970 (age 54); Brest, Belarus

Sport
- Sport: Rowing

Irina Bazilevskaya (born 11 August 1970) is a Belarusian rower. She competed in the women's eight event at the 2000 Summer Olympics.
