= Marieke Westerhof =

Dutch rower (born 1974)

Personal information
- Born: Marieke Aleida Westerhof; 14 August 1974 (age 51) Denekamp
- Height: 186 cm (6 ft 1 in)
- Weight: 75 kg (165 lb)

Sport
- Sport: Rowing
- Club: Algemene Utrechtse Studenten Roeivereniging Orca
Medal record
Women's rowing
Representing the Netherlands
Olympic Games
Silver medal – second place	2000 Sydney	Eight

Marieke Aleida Westerhof (born 14 August 1974 in Denekamp, Overijssel) is a retired rower from the Netherlands. She won a silver medal in the women's eight with coxswain in the 2000 Summer Olympics in Sydney, Australia. Four years earlier, at the 1996 Summer Olympics in Atlanta, United States, Westerhof was part of the Dutch women's eight that finished sixth in the Olympic final.
