= Elien Meijer =

Dutch rower (born 1970)

Personal information
- Born: Elsiena Janneke Meijer; 25 January 1970 (age 56) Den Helder, Netherlands
- Height: 177 cm (5 ft 10 in)
- Weight: 71 kg (157 lb)

Sport
- Sport: Rowing
- Club: Algemene Utrechtse Studenten Roeivereniging Orca
Medal record
Women's rowing
Representing the Netherlands
Olympic Games
Silver medal – second place	2000 Sydney	Eight
World Rowing Championships
Gold medal – first place	1994 Indianapolis	Coxless four

Elsiena Janneke Meijer (born 25 January 1970) is a retired rower from the Netherlands.

Meijer was born in 1970 in Den Helder, Netherlands. At the 1994 World Rowing Championships in Indianapolis, United States, she won a gold medal with the women's coxless four and came fourth with the women's eight. At the 1996 Summer Olympics in Atlanta, United States, Meijer and Anneke Venema finished eighth in the women's coxless pair competition. She won a silver medal in the women's eight in the 2000 Summer Olympics in Sydney, Australia.
