= Martijntje Quik =

Dutch rower (born 1973)

Personal information
- Born: 24 October 1973 (age 52) De Bilt, Netherlands
- Height: 168 cm (5 ft 6 in)
- Weight: 50 kg (110 lb)

Sport
- Sport: Rowing
- Club: Amsterdamsche Studenten Roeivereeniging NEREUS
Medal record
Women's rowing
Representing the Netherlands
Olympic Games
Silver medal – second place	2000 Sydney	Eight

Martijntje Quik (born 24 October 1973 in De Bilt) is a former coxswain from the Netherlands. She won a silver medal in the women's eight in the 2000 Summer Olympics in Sydney, Australia.
