= Inessa Zakhareuskaya =

Belarusian rower

Personal information
- Nationality: Belarusian
- Born: 14 August 1973 (age 51); Minsk, Belarus

Sport
- Sport: Rowing

Inessa Zakhareuskaya (born 14 August 1973) is a Belarusian rower. She competed in the women's eight event at the 2000 Summer Olympics.
