= Emily Martin (rower) =

Australian rower

Personal information
- Born: 9 May 1979 (age 47) Melbourne
- Years active: 1997–2010
- Height: 181 cm (5 ft 11 in)
- Weight: 79 kg (174 lb)

Sport
- Sport: Rowing
- Club: Wendouree Ballarat RC
Medal record
Women's rowing
Representing Australia
World Rowing Championships
Gold medal – first place	2001 Lucerne	W8+
Gold medal – first place	2005 Gifu	W8+
Gold medal – first place	2005 Gifu	W4-
Bronze medal – third place	2006 Eton	W8+
Bronze medal – third place	2007 Munich	W4-
World Rowing U23 Championships
Gold medal – first place	U23 1998 Greece	W4-

Emily Martin (born 9 May 1979) is an Australian former rower, a three time world champion and an Olympian.

== Club and state rowing ==
Martin started rowing at Ballarat Grammar School whose facilities were located at the Wendouree Ballarat boat shed. After school she joined the Wendouree Ballarat Rowing Club. She was awarded a scholarship to the New South Wales Institute of Sport prior to her 2001 World Championship success.

Martin was selected to represent Victoria in the state youth eight racing for the Bicentennial Cup at the Interstate Regatta within the Australian Rowing Championships in 1997 and 1998 and saw victories in both years. On nine consecutive occasions from 1999 to 2007 and then in 2010 she was selected to the Victorian senior women's eight who race for the Queen Elizabeth Cup at that same Interstate Regatta. She stroked that crew to victory in 2000 and rowed in seven total senior victories. Of the twelve occasions Martin raced for Victoria in representative crews she saw nine victories, two second placings and one third place.

== International representative rowing ==
Martin's debut representative appearance came in 1998 at age nineteen in a development four with Angela Heitman, Deidre Coates and Kristina Larsen with whom she would share later senior success. They won gold in a W4- at the 1998 World Rowing Cup III in Lucerne. Selectors then sent that four to the 1998 World Rowing U23 Championships in Ioannina, Greece where they won an U23 World Championship title, leading all the way in the final and beating out the US crew by 6.4 seconds.

Martin secured a seat at five in the Australian women's senior eight in 1999. She raced at the World Rowing Cup III that year in Lucerne and then at the 1999 World Rowing Championships in St Catharine's where the eight placed fifth. Her strength and skill ensured her place in the eight leading into the 2000 Olympic year. She rowed at seven in both World Cups II and III in Europe and then in Sydney for the 2000 Olympics in that critical seat setting up the bow side behind Jane Robinson. They managed a fifth-place finish in the final.

Martin was selected in the Australian squad for the 2001 international tour. In their first competitive outing of the 2001 season, racing as an Australian Institute of Sport selection eight at Henley Royal Regatta, Martin won the 2001 Henley Prize for women's eights (from 2002 this event was renamed the Remenham Challenge Cup). She rowed in two Australian senior crews at the World Rowing Cup IV regatta in Munich, Germany. In a coxless pair with Kristina Larsen she placed fourth while in the Australian eight they placed second and were on track for possible World Championship success. A month later at the 2001 World Rowing Championships in Lucerne, Martin was in the five seat of the Australian women's heavyweight crew who won Australia's first ever women's eight World Championship title. At those same World Championships she placed fourth in the final of the coxless pair with Larsen.

Martin had pressure holding her seat in the eight in 2002 as the selectors tried different combinations. She raced in a pair and the eight at the World Rowing Cup II in Lucerne and then in the pair at World Cup III in Munich. For the 2002 World Championships in Seville, Victoria Roberts and Rachael Taylor were seated at seven and five in the eight and Martin raced the Australian coxless pair with Monique Heinke. They finished in sixth place.

Though she still rowed at the top national level in 2003 and 2004, Martin was not picked to representative crews. But the typical squad changes occurring in the first year after an Olympiad as rowers step away, happened again after Athens 2004 and Martin took her opportunities. She was selected in both the W4- and the W8+ for the 2005 World Rowing Championships in Gifu Japan. Both crews took gold with Martin rowing in the middle of each boat to her second and third World Championship titles. The following year at Eton Dorney 2006 Martin rowed in the eight and in a pair with Sarah Heard. The W8+ took bronze behind the US and Germany while the pair placed ninth.

Martin was still in contention for the eight in 2007 and raced at the World Rowing Cup I in the two seat. For the World Rowing Cup II she raced only in the coxless four who won silver. Her final Australian representative appearance was in the four at the 2007 World Championships with Phoebe Stanley, Katelyn Gray and Victoria Roberts who placed third winning Martin a bronze, her fifth World Championship medal. It was a fitting end to an outstanding fourteen year elite career.

== Rowing palmares ==
=== World Championships ===
- 1998 U23 World Championships W4- two seat – gold
- 1999 St Catharine's W8+ five seat – fifth
- 2001 Lucerne W2- bow – fourth
- 2001 Lucerne W8+ five seat – gold
- 2002 Seville W2- bow – sixth
- 2005 Kaizu, Gifu W8+ five seat – gold
- 2005 Kaizu, Gifu W4- two seat – gold
- 2006 Dorney W8+ seven seat – bronze
- 2006 Dorney W2- bow – ninth
- 2007 Munich W4- three seat – bronze

=== Olympics ===
- 2000 Sydney Olympics W8+ seven seat – fifth

=== Australian Interstate Championship ===
- 1997 Interstate women's youth W8+ four seat – first
- 1998 Interstate women's youth W8+ seven seat – first
- 1999 Interstate women's W8+ three seat – first
- 2000 Interstate women's W8+ stroke – first
- 2001 Interstate women's W8+ four seat – first
- 2002 Interstate women's W8+ stroke – second
- 2003 Interstate women's W8+ seven seat – second
- 2004 Interstate women's W8+ two seat – third
- 2005 Interstate women's W8+ five seat– first
- 2006 Interstate women's W8+ five seat– first
- 2007 Interstate women's W8+ three seat– first
- 2010 Interstate women's W8+ seven seat – first
