= Valentina Khokhlova =

Belarusian rowing coxswain (born 1949)

Personal information
- Native name: Валентина Никаноровна Хохлова
- Full name: Valentina Nikanorovna Khokhlova
- Born: 10 February 1949 (age 77) Lipetsk, Russian SFSR, Soviet Union
- Height: 1.59 m (5 ft 3 in)
- Weight: 50 kg (110 lb)

Sport
- Country: Soviet Union; Belarus
- Sport: Rowing
Medal record
World Championships
Gold medal – first place	1983 Duisburg	W8+
Gold medal – first place	1985 Hazelwinkel	W8+
Gold medal – first place	1986 Nottingham	W8+
Friendship Games
Gold medal – first place	1984 Moscow	W8+

Valentina Khokhlova (born 10 February 1949 in Lipetsk, Russia) is a Belarusian rowing coxswain. She competed in the women's coxed four at the 1988 Summer Olympics and the women's eight at the 2000 Summer Olympics and won three World Rowing Championships gold medals in the eight class.
