= Anneke Venema =

Dutch rower (born 1971)

Personal information
- Born: 19 January 1971 (age 55) Veendam, Netherlands
Medal record
Women's rowing
Representing the Netherlands
Olympic Games
Silver medal – second place	2000 Sydney	Eight

Anneke Venema (born 19 January 1971) is a retired rower from the Netherlands. She won a silver medal in the women's eight with coxswain in the 2000 Summer Olympics in Sydney, Australia. At the 1996 Summer Olympics in Atlanta, United States, Venema and Elien Meijer finished 8th in the women's coxless pair.
