= Manuel Strauch =

German rower

Personal information
- Born: 18 January 1976 (age 50)

Sport
- Sport: Rowing
Medal record
Men's rowing
Representing Germany
World Rowing Championships
Gold medal – first place	1998 Cologne	Lwt eight

Manuel Strauch (born 18 January 1976) is a German lightweight rower. He won a gold medal at the 1998 World Rowing Championships in Cologne with the lightweight men's eight.
