= Alison Davies =

Australian rower (born 1974)

Personal information
- Full name: Alison Nicole Davies; Alison Nicole Fallon
- Born: 26 September 1974 (age 51) Adelaide, South Australia
- Height: 184 cm (6 ft 0 in)
- Weight: 70 kg (154 lb)

Sport
- Country: Australia
- Sport: Rowing
- Club: Adelaide University Boat Club
Medal record
Women's rowing
Representing Australia
World Rowing Championships
| Silver medal – second place | 1993 Racice | W2- |
| Bronze medal – third place | 1994 Indianapolis | W4- |
Junior World Rowing Championships
| Gold medal – first place | 1992 Montreal | W2- |
Commonwealth Rowing Championships
| Silver medal – second place | 1994 Ontario | Coxless four |
| Silver medal – second place | 1994 Ontario | Eight |

Alison Nicole Fallon (née Davies, born 26 September 1974) is an Australian rower. She was a junior world champion in 1992 and competed at two Olympic Games and at four senior World Rowing Championships.

== State rowing ==
Davies made State selection to represent South Australia in a youth coxless four competing for the Bicentennial Cup at the 1992 Interstate Regatta within the Australian Rowing Championships. For six consecutive years 1993 to 1998 she represented South Australia racing for the Women's Interstate Four Championship. Her crews won the championship in 1994 and 1996 when she stroked the boat. Since 1999 the Women's Interstate Open event has been raced in eights. Davies rowed in the 1999 and 2000 South Australian eights.

== International representative rowing ==
Davies was first selected to represent Australia at the 1992 World Junior Championships in Montreal in a coxless pair with her South Australian team mate Victoria Toogood. They won the world junior title. She made the Australian senior team for the 1993 World Rowing Championships, raced a W2- with Victoria Toogood and won silver. The following year at Indianapolis 1994 she was in the bow seat of the W4- and won the bronze medal with Toogood, Kate Slatter and Megan Still.

For Tampere 1995 and St. Catharines 1999 Davies was selected in Australian women's eight. She competed at the 1996 Atlanta and 2000 Sydney Olympics in the women's eight which both placed fifth.
