= Katie Foulkes =

Australian rower

Personal information
- Born: 3 October 1976 (age 48); Geelong, Victoria, Australia

Sport
- Country: Australia
- Sport: Rowing

Achievements and titles
- Olympic finals: 2000 Women's 8+ 2004 Women's 8+

Katie Foulkes (born 3 October 1976 in Geelong) is an Australian rower who competed as the women's eight coxswain in the 2000 Summer Olympics and the 2004 Summer Olympics.
