= Marina Kuzhmar =

Belarusian rower

Personal information
- Full name: Marina Nikolayevna Kuzhmar
- Born: 3 January 1977 (age 48); Minsk, Belarus
- Height: 1.74 m (5 ft 9 in)
- Weight: 70 kg (150 lb)

Sport
- Country: Belarus
- Sport: Rowing

Marina Kuzhmar (born 3 January 1977 in Minsk, Belarus) is a Belarusian rower. She competed in the women's eight at the 2000 Summer Olympics.
