= Vincent Montabonel =

French rower

Personal information
- Born: 29 March 1977 (age 49)

Sport
- Sport: Rowing
Medal record
Men's rowing
Representing France
World Rowing Championships
Gold medal – first place	1998 Cologne	Lwt coxless pair

Vincent Montabonel (born 29 March 1977) is a French lightweight rower. He won a gold medal at the 1998 World Rowing Championships in Cologne with the lightweight men's coxless pair.
