= Wendy Wilbur =

American rower (born 1972)

Wendy Wilbur (born April 4, 1972) is an American rower who was on the U.S. National Rowing Team between 1997 and 2003.

== Early life ==
Wendy was born on April 4, 1972. She attended East Bridgewater High School where she played a season of softball, ran track for two seasons, and played basketball.

== College career ==
After high school, Wilbur went to Salem State for two years where she was on the swim team. Wilbur then attended the University of Massachusetts Amherst from 1994 to 1997. During her time at UMass, she graduated with a bachelor's degree in sociology and communications as well as a master's degree in labor studies. She earned U.S. Rowing Association Academic All-American status in 1995.

== U.S. National Team ==
In the 2003 World Rowing Championships, she won a gold medal in the women's coxless four event. She also won a bronze medal at the 1999 World Rowing Championships in the same event, and a silver medal at the 1998 World Rowing Championships in the women's eight event.

== Post-National Team ==
Between 2005 and 2009, Wilbur was an assistant women's rowing coach at Boston College. Wilbur held this same position at Harvard between 2009 and 2014. She then worked as the director of rowing operations at the University of Texas Austin.

Wilbur was inducted into the UMass Athletics Hall of Fame in 2016.

== See also ==
Wendy Wilbur at World Rowing
