= Chris Morgan (rower) =

Australian rower (born 1982)

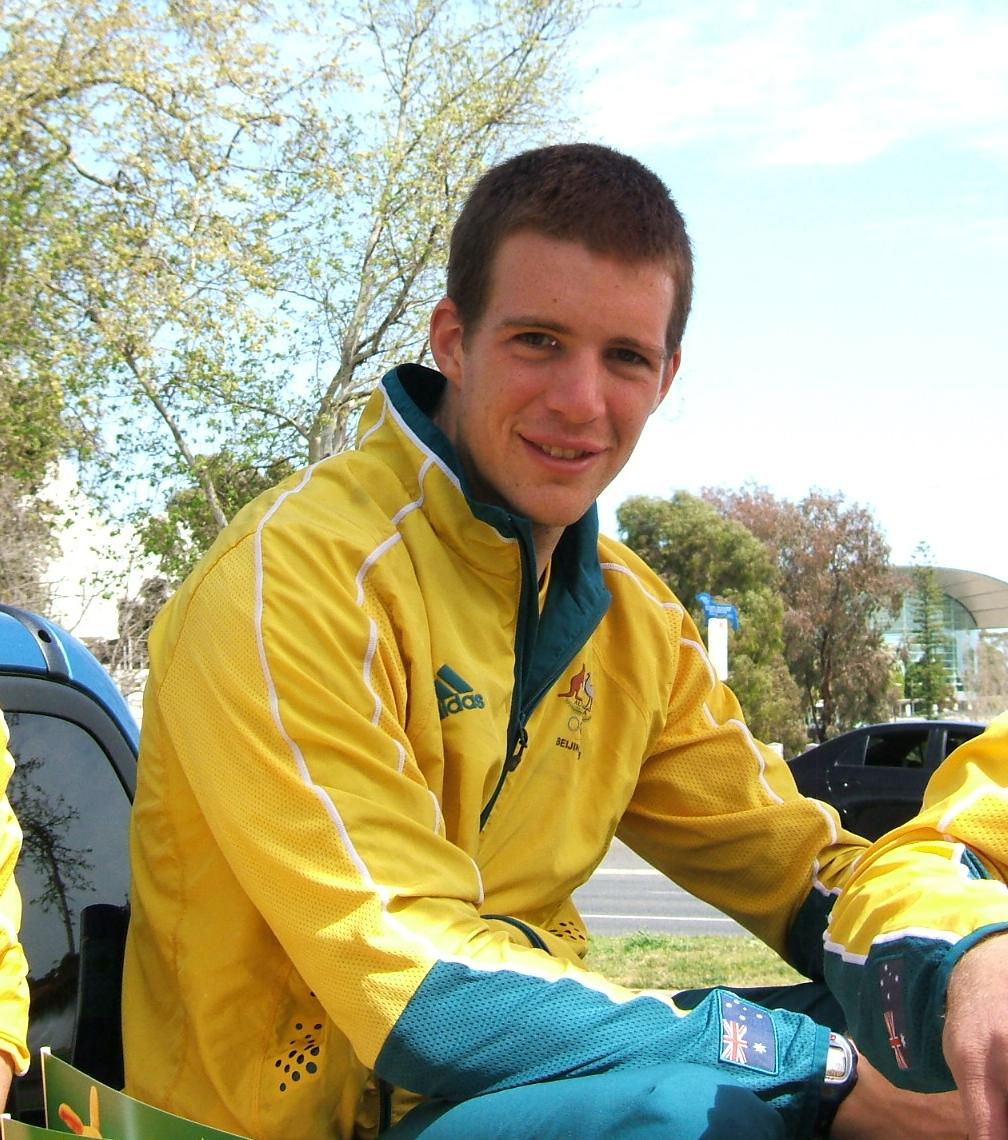
- Morgan in 2008

Personal information
- Born: 15 December 1982 (age 43) Adelaide, South Australia
- Education: Norwood Morialta High School

Sport
- Country: Australia
- Sport: Rowing
- Club: Adelaide University Boat Club; Sydney Rowing Club
Medal record
Men's rowing
Representing Australia
Olympic Games
Bronze medal – third place	2012 London	Quad scull
World Rowing Championships
Gold medal – first place	2010 Karapiro	Coxed pair
Gold medal – first place	2011 Bled	Quad scull

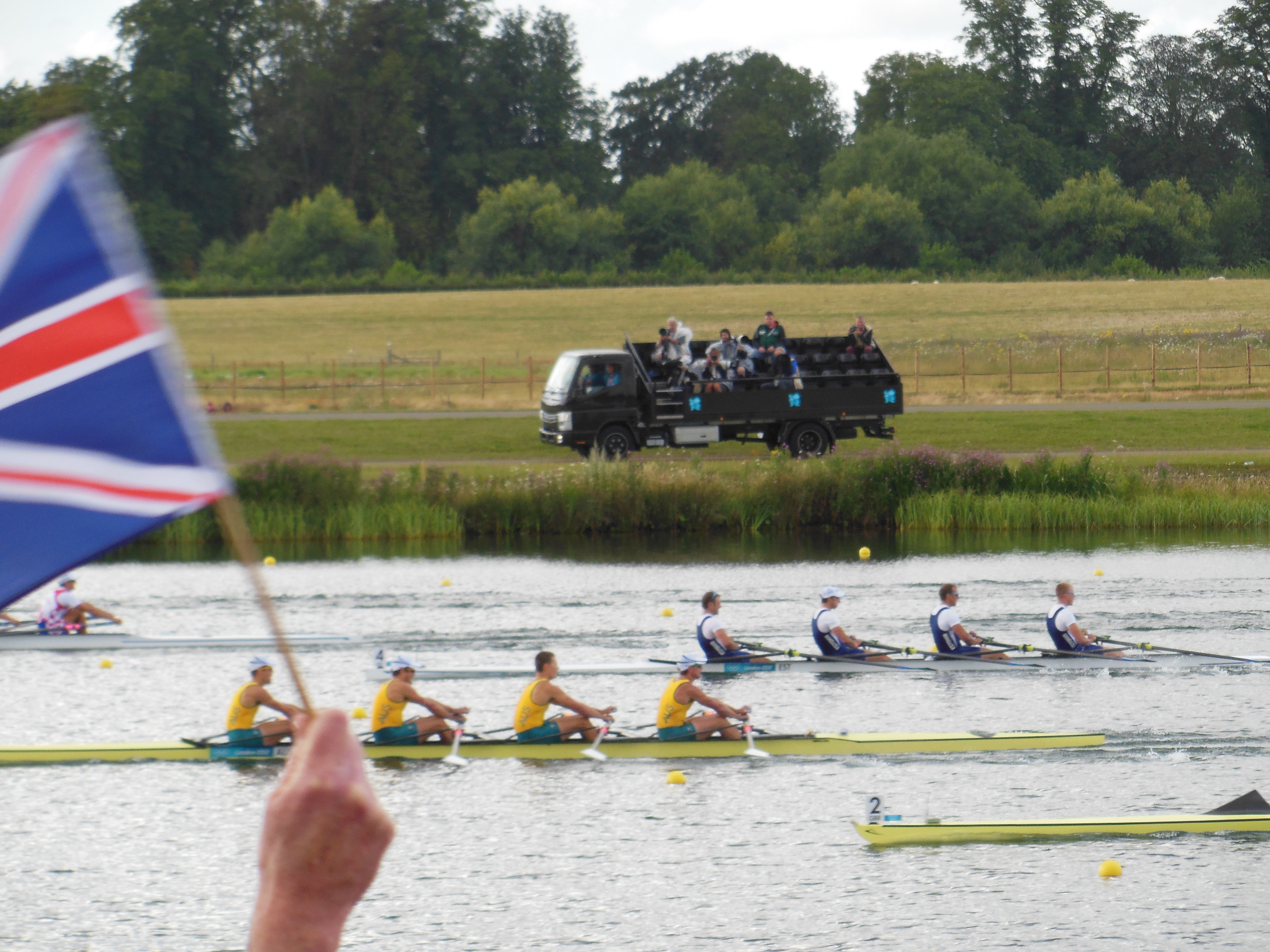
Morgan, in yellow, bow seat. Men's quad final at London 2012.

Chris Morgan (born 15 December 1982) is an Australian former representative rower. He was a national champion, two-time world champion, three time Olympian and Olympic medal winner from Adelaide, South Australia. He won world championships in both sculls and in sweep-oared boat classes.

== Education ==
Raised in Adelaide, Morgan attended Burnside Primary and Norwood Morialta High School. He had no exposure to rowing before university. He has a Bachelor of Commerce and Bachelor of Computer Science from the University of Adelaide and works as a software engineer.

Morgan began his athletic career as a competitive walker. He took up rowing in 2003 after participating in an ergometer competition held by the Adelaide University Boat Club during the University's Orientation Week. He held the fastest time on the competition until a rower from the Boat Club competed at the last moment in order to claim the case of beer that was offered as a prize. As a result of entering the competition, Chris was invited to join the Boat Club. He undertook a "Learn to Row" program and that same season was competing for Adelaide University in senior boats.

Morgan was diagnosed with high functioning autism at age 28. He has reported that his communication style and obsession with performance improvement made it hard for him to be understood and accepted in the team environment of a rowing squad.

== Club and state rowing ==
At the end of Morgan's first season of rowing in 2003–04, he won a gold medal in a double scull at the World University Games in Brive-la-Gaillarde, France. He was selected for the Australian rowing squad in 2005 and invited to train with the Australian Institute of Sport.

In 2010, Morgan won the Australian national single scull championship, becoming the first South Australian to do so in 40 years.

Morgan has consistently represented for his state at the Interstate Regatta within the Australian Rowing Championships. In the twelve-year period 2005 to 2016 he raced for South Australia on nine occasions in King's Cup eights and on eight occasions he sculled in the President's Cup. He rowed in both boats at five championships.

After London Olympics Morgan relocated to Sydney and continued his club rowing from the Sydney Rowing Club.

== International rowing career ==
Morgan represented Australia in the men's quad scull at the Beijing 2008 Olympics. His crew won their heat in a world's best time of 5:36.20, beating the previous fastest time, set by Poland, by a second. The Australians finished fourth in the final. That time of 5:36.20 stood as the Olympic best time until the 2020 Tokyo Olympics.

At the 2010 World Rowing Championships Morgan won the coxed pair world championship title with partner Dominic Grimm and coxswain David Webster at Lake Karapiro, New Zealand.

At the 2011 World Rowing Championships in an upset, Morgan rowing in the Australian men's quad defeated the German crew to take gold. Following a costly mistake in the German boat, the Australian crew took the lead in the final metres and won the race by 0.25secs.

At the 2012 London Olympics, Morgan won bronze in the men's quad scull in a time of 5:45.22.

In 2016 Morgan qualified with West Australian David Watts to contest the men's double scull at the 2016 Rio Olympics. They were out-raced in the semi-finals and won the B final for an overall seventh placing.
