= Adelaide University Boat Club =

Australian rowing club

- Motto: Mobilitate Vicemus
- Location: Adelaide, SA
- Coordinates: 34°54′57″S 138°36′07″E
- Home water: River Torrens
- Founded: 1881
- Affiliations: Adelaide University Sports Association
- Website: www.adelaideuniversityboatclub.com

Events
- Inter-Varsity Championships

Notable members
- Collier Cudmore; Jaime Fernandez; Amber Halliday; Marguerite Houston; Kate Slatter; Tim Willoughby

The Adelaide University Boat Club is a rowing club affiliated with the University of Adelaide. The club was founded in 1881, and in 1896 helped to form the Adelaide University Sports Association. The main clubrooms, donated by Robert Barr Smith in 1909, are located on the north bank of the River Torrens on War Memorial Drive, adjacent to the Adelaide University Sports Grounds. The shed has two boat bays, a gym and weights room and a small bar. The club also leases a secondary boatshed at the South Australian Rowing Association complex on Military Road at West Lakes, and also trains regularly at Port Adelaide's North Arm Creek and Murray Bridge. Members have included rowers of all levels, from total beginners to Olympic Gold Medallists. The club shares the nickname "The Blacks" with the Adelaide University Football Club.

== Competitions ==
Adelaide University Boat Club, winners 1997 City of Adelaide sprint regatta

One of the primary purposes of the Adelaide University Boat Club, as stated in its constitution, is to field competitive crews in the Intervarsity Championships. AUBC also competes in local regattas, and has a number of rowers who compete at South Australian Sports Institute time trials and the National Regatta.

Recent performance by the club has been impressive, winning the South Australian State Championships in both Men's and Women's Eights in 2005, 2006, 2007 and 2008. Interstate performance has also been good. The club achieved a number of wins in the Victorian State Championships in 2006, and also gained a number of silver medals and a gold at the National Regatta. Club members have also enjoyed success at the recent Under 23 World Championships in Belgium.

Club members competed for the University of Adelaide to win the Oxford and Cambridge Cup at the 2009 Australian Universities Rowing Championships in Canberra. The crew included Beijing Olympian James McRae and defeated the highly fancied Sydney crew by over a boat length.

In 2010, Club member Chris Morgan won the National Single Scull Championship, becoming the first South Australian in 40 years to do so.

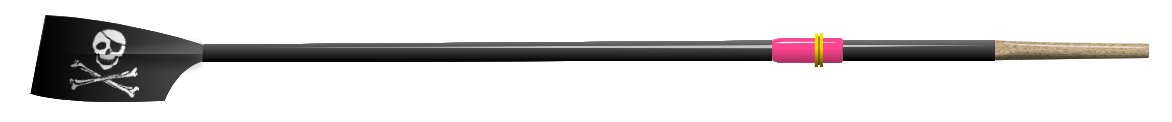
AUBC Blade with Jolly Roger. Regular club blades are plain black

== Notable members ==
- Sir Collier Cudmore - Gold Medallist in the Men's Coxless Four at the 1908 London Olympics. Although he rowed for Great Britain, he was the first Australian to win an Olympic gold medal for rowing.
- Tim Willoughby - Rowed twice in the Olympic Men's Eight (1980 and 1984), winning bronze in '84.
- Kate Slatter - Three time Olympian in the Women's Coxless Four (1992) and Coxless Pair (1996 and 2000), winning gold at Atlanta '96 and a Silver at Sydney 2000, Kate is the most successful past member of AUBC.
- Jaime Fernandez - Three time Olympian in the Men's Eight (1992, 1996 and 2000), winning a silver medal in 2000.
- Amber Halliday - Three-time world champion in the Women's Lightweight Double Scull (2002,'03, '07) and in the Lightweight Quad Scull (2001), Olympian at the 2004 Athens Games and 2008 Beijing Games, and multiple winner at the National Championships.
- Marguerite Houston - World Champion in the Lightweight Quad Scull in 2002, and the Lightweight Double Scull in 2007 with double-partner Amber Halliday. Houston and Halliday competed together in the Lightweight Double Scull at the 2008 Beijing Games.
- Chris Morgan - World Champion in the Quadruple Scull in 2011 and Coxed Pair in 2010, and three-time Olympian at Athens 2008, London 2012 and Rio 2016.
