= Katie Maloney =

American rower

Personal information
- Born: March 22, 1974 (age 51); Cleveland, Ohio, United States

Sport
- Sport: Rowing

Katie Maloney (born March 22, 1974) is an American rower. She competed in the women's eight event at the 2000 Summer Olympics.
