= Ali Sanders =

British rower (born 1970)

Personal information
- Nationality: British
- Born: 15 December 1970 (age 55) Hertford, England

Sport
- Sport: Rowing

Ali Sanders (born 15 December 1970) is a British physician and rower. She competed in the women's eight event at the 2000 Summer Olympics. She later qualified as a consultant in emergency medicine. She was also the clinical director of the Emergency Department at St. Mary's Hospital.
