= Kate Slatter =

Australian rower (born 1971)

Personal information
- Born: Kate Elizabeth Slatter; 10 November 1971 (age 54)

Sport
- Sport: Rowing
- Club: Adelaide University Boat Club
Medal record
Women's rowing
Representing Australia
Olympic Games
Gold medal – first place	1996 Atlanta	Coxless pair
Silver medal – second place	2000 Sydney	Coxless pair
World Rowing Championships
Gold medal – first place	Tampere 1995	Coxless pair
Bronze medal – third place	Indianapolis 1994	Coxless four
Bronze medal – third place	St Catharines 1999	Coxless pair
Commonwealth Rowing Championships
Silver medal – second place	1994 Ontario	Coxless four
Silver medal – second place	1994 Ontario	Eight

Kate Elizabeth Slatter OAM (born 10 November 1971) is an Australian former rower, a sixteen time national champion, world champion and Olympic champion from Adelaide, South Australia. She is a three-time Olympian who in 1996 won Australia's first Olympic gold in women's rowing.

== Club and state rowing ==
Slatter began rowing at the Adelaide University Boat Club in 1989, and rowed in their victorious women's eight at the 1996 Australian University Games, two weeks after winning gold in Atlanta.

Slatter made her selection debut for South Australia in 1992 in the state women's coxless four to contest the ULVA Trophy at the Interstate Regatta within the Australian Rowing Championships. She raced in further South Australian women's coxless fours in 1993, 1996 and 1998 seeing a victory in 1996. In 1999 the blue riband women's heavy weight event at the Australian Interstate Regatta became an event for eights. Slatter stroked the first two South Australian women's eight which competed for the ULVA Trophy in 1999 and 2000.

In AUBC colours Slatter contested national titles at the Australian Rowing Championships on many occasions starting with her 1990 win of the U23 women's coxless four championship. In 1991 Slatter first competed at the national level with Megan Still when they contested the Australian women's pair championship title in an AIS composite crew. That same year Slatter and Still won two national senior championships together - the open women's coxless four and the open women's eight in an AIS crew but wearing AUBC colours. In 2000 she won the national coxless pairs championship title with Rachael Taylor. All told Slatter won sixteen Australian championship titles for either South Australia or the Adelaide University Boat Club.

== International representative rowing ==
Slatter's first Australian representative selection came at age twenty and straight into the senior women's squad for the 1991 World Rowing Championships in Vienna. She was selected in the women's coxless four with Jodie Dobson, Emmy Snook and Megan Marcks. All four girls doubled up in the Australian women's eight.

The 1991 coxless four stayed together into the 1992 Olympic year and were selected to compete at the 1992 Barcelona Olympics. They had to defeat France in a qualification regatta to get through. Then in the Olympic lead-up Marcks suffered a stress fracture of the rib affecting the crew's preparation. They made the Olympic final in the coxless four, a good result given their lack of international racing experience but finished in overall sixth place.

With Snook and Dobson changed out for Courtney Johnstone and Gina Douglas, Slatter and Marcks stayed together in the coxless four into 1993 and they competed at the 1993 World Rowing Championships in Racice where again they were last in the A final and achieved a sixth place. At the 1994 World Rowing Championships Slatter and Marcks were still in the coxless four and now with Alison Davies and Tory Toogood they rowed to a bronze medal. All four girls backed up in the Australian women's eight and with Slatter in the six seat, they rowed to a sixth-place finish.

In 1995 in their fifth year of rowing together Slatter and Marcks stepped into the Australian women's coxed pair. They were about to make Australian women's rowing history. At the 1995 World Rowing Championships in Tampere they won their heat, semi and the final claimed a world championship title and put their opponents on notice as to their Olympics aspirations. They also doubled up in the engine room - seated at three and four - of the women's eight who placed ninth overall.

At the 1996 Atlanta Olympics, Marcks and Slatter in the coxless pair prevailed over an American crew with a 0.39 seconds margin to claim the first Olympic title by an Australian women’s crew. The same day, the pair's gold medal was matched by the Oarsome Foursome of Ginn, Tomkins, McKay, Green. Additionally, the men’s coxless pair won a silver metal, marking the event as a significant day for Australian rowing until the Olympic regatta in 2008.

Upon Marcks' 1996 retirement, Slatter was determined to go again and needed to find a new pair partner to build a campaign for Sydney 2000. She chose Rachael Taylor after rowing with her in the women's eight at various international competitions including the 1998 World Rowing Championships. Slatter competed in the eight and in a coxless four at two World Rowing Cups in Europe in 1998 and then in the eight to a fourth placing at Cologne 1998.

In 1999 Slatter and Rachael Taylor came together in the coxless pair. They raced at a World Rowing Cup and then at the 1999 World Rowing Championships in St Catharines to a bronze medal. In the 2000 Olympic year they raced with success at two World Rowing Cups in Europe before coming to Sydney. At the Sydney 2000 Olympics they placed second in their heat, won their repechage and placed second behind the Romanians in the Olympic final, beating out the US pair for the silver by 4/100ths of a second. Their racing at Sydney 2000 was in a shell named after Megan Marcks. It was a fitting end to a stellar representative career for Slatter.

Arguably Slatter was Australia's finest ever female rower until Kim Crow's dominance was established between 2012 and 2016.

== Accolades ==
Slatter was awarded the Order of Australia medal for her rowing achievements.

In 2001, she was inducted into the Australian Institute of Sport "Best of the Best". In 2002, she was inducted into the Sport Australia Hall of Fame.
