= Heather Davis =

Canadian rower (born 1974)

Medal record

Women's rowing

Representing Canada

Olympic Games
Bronze medal – third place	2000 Sydney	Eights

World Rowing Championships
Bronze medal – third place	1998 Cologne	W8+

Heather Davis (born 26 February 1974 in Vancouver) is a Canadian rower.
