= Lail =

Lail is a surname. Notable people with the surname include:

- Brady Lail (born 1993), American baseball player
- Elizabeth Lail (born 1992), American actress
- Leah Lail, American actress and real estate agent
- Muedzul Lail Tan Kiram (born 1966), head of the Royal House of Sulu, Philippines

== See also ==
- Al-Lail
- Lehal
