= Kristina Larsen (rower) =

Australian rower (born 1978)

Personal information
- Born: 17 March 1978 (age 48)
- Years active: 1995–2004

Sport
- Sport: Rowing
- Club: Sydney Rowing Club
Medal record
Women's rowing
Representing Australia
World Rowing Championships
Gold medal – first place	2001 Lucerne	W8+
Gold medal – first place	2002 Seville	W4-
Silver medal – second place	2002 Seville	W8+
World Rowing U23 Championships
Gold medal – first place	U23 1998 Greece	W4-
Gold medal – first place	U23 1997 Milan	W4-

Kristina Larsen (born 17 March 1978 in Sydney) is an Australian former representative rower. She is a two-time World Champion, an Olympian and won ten Australian national championship titles in sweep-oared boats, often at stroke.

== Club and state rowing ==
Larsen was selected in a rowing talent identification program in 1993 aged just 15. She had already excelled in surf life saving, netball and athletics and was regarded as a promising all-round athlete. Her early rowing training was undertaken at the New South Wales Institute of Sports on Narrabeen Lakes where she developed her skills before receiving support from the AIS. By 1995 she was in the Australian junior representative squad and rowing at club level from the Sydney Rowing Club.

Larsen rowed in state representative eights for New South Wales contesting the Interstate women's eight title at the Australian Rowing Championships for the ULVA Trophy and later the Queen Elizabeth II Cup. She represented her state in 1999 and 2000 and from 2002 to 2004. She stroked the New South Wales women's eight to victories in 2002 and 2003 and rowed at two in the winning 2004 crew.

Larsen contested events in sweep boats at the Australian Rowing Championships every year from 1999 to 2004. She won national championship titles in the women's eight in 2000 (an AIS composite crew) and in both the coxless four and coxless pair in 2001 (in Sydney Rowing Club colours). At the 2003 Australian Championships she won all three women's sweep boat national titles wearing Sydney colours in composite selection crews. In 2004 she won another open women's eight national championship title.

== International rowing career ==
Larsen was picked to represent Australia at the World Junior Rowing Championships in Poznan in 1995. She was selected to stroke the women's junior eight though they did not race due to illness. The following year she was picked in a junior pair with Shea Crumlin to race at the World Junior Championships in Glasgow and they won a bronze.

In 1997 Larsen was elevated to a coxless four contesting the World Rowing U23 Championships in Milan. They won gold. She repeated that feat the following year at the U23 Championships in Ioannina, Greece winning another U23 Championship title. For St. Catharines 1999 Larsen rowed in the six seat of the Australian senior women's eight who placed fifth.

In 2000 she made the Australian women's eight who won bronze at two World Rowing Cups in the lead up to the Olympics. For the 2000 Sydney Olympics she rowed at six in the eight who had a credible fifth placing in the final.

Larsen made the Australian squad for the 2001 international tour. In their first competitive outing of the 2001 season, racing as an Australian Institute of Sport selection eight at Henley Royal Regatta, Larsen stroked the Australian eight to win the 2001 Henley Prize for women's eights (from 2002 this event was renamed the Remenham Challenge Cup). Larsen was the selected in two Australian crews at the 2001 World Rowing Cup IV in Munich Germany. In a coxless pair with Emily Martin she placed fourth while the Australian eight placed second and were on track for possible World Championship success. A month later at the 2001 World Rowing Championships in Lucerne, Switzerland Larsen stroked the Australian women's heavyweight crew to win Australia's first ever women's eight World Championship title.

The Australian women's eight stayed together into 2002 with just one seat change. Their European campaign ahead of the World Championships saw them take a bronze medal at the Rowing World Cup II in Lucerne and silver at the Rowing World Cup III in Munich. Larsen also raced at these regattas in a coxless pair with Victoria Roberts placing 7th and 10th. At the 2002 World Championships in Seville Spain, the Australian eight won their heat but were beaten out by the USA by 0.45 seconds in the final. With Larsen setting the pace at stroke the Australians just held out the Germans and she won her second World Championship placing – a silver. As in 2001 four members of the eight including Larsen also doubled up in the coxless four to defend Australia's title. At Seville 2002 with Larsen in the bow, Victoria Roberts at stroke and Rebecca Sattin and Jodi Winter in the engine room, the Australian girls won their heat and beat Canada in the final to claim another World Championship title – Larsen's second.

Larsen was again in elite Australian crew contention in 2003. She raced in a coxless four and the eight at the World Rowing Cup III in Lucerne and secured her place in the eight for the 2003 World Rowing Championships in Milan. With Larsen in the two seat the eight placed fourth. It was her last Australian representative appearance.
