= Carin ter Beek =

Dutch rower (born 1970)

- Carin ter Beek at the World Rowing Championships in Lucerne

Personal information
- Full name: Carin Anuschka ter Beek
- Born: 29 December 1970 (age 55) Groningen, Netherlands
- Height: 186 cm (6 ft 1 in)
- Weight: 68 kg (150 lb)

Sport
- Sport: Rowing
- Club: Proteus Eretes, Delft
Medal record
Women's rowing
Representing the Netherlands
Olympic Games
Silver medal – second place	2000 Sydney	Eight

Carin Anuschka ter Beek (born 29 December 1970 in Groningen) is a retired rower from the Netherlands. She won a silver medal in the women's eight in the 2000 Summer Olympics in Sydney, Australia.
