= Charlotte Miller =

British rower

Personal information
- Nationality: British
- Born: 24 November 1972 (age 52); York, England

Sport
- Sport: Rowing

Charlotte Miller (born 24 November 1972) is a British rower. She competed in the women's eight event at the 2000 Summer Olympics.
