= Francesca Zino =

British rower

Personal information
- Nationality: British
- Born: 11 February 1975 (age 50); London, England

Sport
- Sport: Rowing

Francesca Zino (born 11 February 1975) is a British rower. She competed in the women's eight event at the 2000 Summer Olympics.
