= Torrey Folk =

American rower

Personal information
- Born: December 10, 1973 (age 51); Ann Arbor, Michigan, United States

Sport
- Sport: Rowing

Torrey Folk (born December 10, 1973) is an American rower. She competed in the women's eight event at the 2000 Summer Olympics.
