= Linda Miller (rower) =

American rower

Linda Miller OLY
Personal information
- National team: United States
- Born: October 16, 1972 (age 54) Washington, D.C., United States

Sport
- Sport: Rowing

Linda S. Miller (born October 16, 1972) is an American rower. She competed in the women's eight event at the 2000 Summer Olympics.
