= Dorota Urbaniak =

Canadian rower

Medal record

Women's rowing

Representing Canada

Olympic Games
Bronze medal – third place	2000 Sydney	Eights

World Rowing Championships
Silver medal – second place	1997 Aiguebelette	W8+
Bronze medal – third place	1998 Cologne	W8+
Bronze medal – third place	1999 St. Catharines	W8+

Dorota Urbaniak (born 6 May 1972 in Łask, Poland) is a Canadian rower.
