= Rowan Carroll =

British rower (born 1970)

Personal information
- Nationality: British
- Born: 3 November 1970 (age 54); London, England

Sport
- Sport: Rowing
- Club: NCRA

Rowan Carroll (born 3 November 1970) is a British rower. She competed in the women's eight event at the 2000 Summer Olympics. She was part of the quadruple sculls with Trisha Corless, Tonia Williams and Lucy Hart that won the national title rowing for the NCRA at the 1995 National Championships, she also gained a silver in the single sculls behind Tish Reid.
