= Alison Trickey =

British rower

Personal information
- Nationality: British
- Born: 1 September 1975 (age 49); Falmouth, England

Sport
- Sport: Rowing

Alison Trickey (born 1 September 1975) is a British rower. She competed in the women's eight event at the 2000 Summer Olympics.
