= Rajanya Shah =

American rower (born 1974)

Dr. Rajanya Shah
Personal information
- Nationality: American
- Born: February 16, 1974 (age 52) Albany, New York
- Height: 152 cm (5 ft 0 in)
Medal record
Woman's rowing
Representing the United States
Silver medal – second place	1998 World Rowing Championships	Woman's eights
Silver medal – second place	1999 World Rowing Championships	Woman's eights

Rajanya Shah (born February 16, 1974) is an American rower who competed in the 1997, 1998, and 1999 World Rowing Championships, as well as the 2000 Summer Olympics in Sydney, Australia.

Shah was born on February 16, 1974, in Albany, New York. She attended Phillips Exeter Academy, and then Brown University, where she coxed the freshman men’s eight for the 1993 season, and the men’s varsity eight from 1994-1996, including winning the national championships in 1994 and 1995.
