= Amy Martin (rower) =

American rower (born 1974)

Amy Martin (born November 4, 1974) is an American rower who competed in the 2000 Summer Olympics. She attended Oregon State University, where she began rowing in 1992. She earned a silver medal in the 1999 World Championships, and a bronze medal in 1998. Martin was a member of the U.S. women's eight rowing team that competed in the 2000 Summer Olympics. The U.S. team came in 6th place.

Martin now owns and operates Frontier Outdoors, a worldwide adventure videography company.
