= Alex Beever =

British rower

Alexandra Beever
Personal information
- Nationality: British
- Born: 5 September 1973 (age 53) Oxford, England

Sport
- Sport: Rowing

Alex Beever (born 5 September 1973) is a British rower. She competed at the 1997 World Rowing Championships in France winning the first ever gold medal for GB women as part of the W4-. At the same event she also secured a bronze medal in the W8+. Alex competed at the 2000 Summer Olympics (Sydney, Australia) – Women's eight

2000 Summer Olympics.[1]
