= Sarah Jones (rower) =

American rower

Personal information
- Born: August 6, 1973 (age 52) Olympia, Washington, U.S.

Sport
- Country: United States
- Sport: Rowing

Sarah Jones (born August 26, 1973) is an American rower. She competed at the 2004 Summer Olympics in Athens, in the women's coxless pair. Jones was born in Olympia, Washington, and resided in Stanwood.
