= Megan Marcks =

Australian rower

Personal information
- Born: Megan Leanne Still; 19 October 1972 (age 54) Queanbeyan, New South Wales, Australia

Sport
- Sport: Rowing
- Club: Australian Institute of Sport; Canberra Rowing Club
Medal record
Women's rowing
Representing Australia
Olympic Games
Gold medal – first place	1996 Atlanta	Coxless pair
World Rowing Championships
Gold medal – first place	1995 Tampere	Coxless pair
Bronze medal – third place	1994 Indianapolis	Coxless four
Commonwealth Rowing Championships
Silver medal – second place	1994 Ontario	Coxless four
Silver medal – second place	1994 Ontario	Eight

Megan Leanne Marcks (née Still), OAM (born 19 October 1972) is an Australian former national, Olympic and world champion rower. She is an Olympic and World Champion in the coxless pair who represented Australia at the Olympics in 1992 and 1996.

== Club and state rowing ==
Marcks was born in 1972 in Queanbeyan, New South Wales. She was selected by the Australian Institute of Sport as a candidate rower (based on physique and aerobic capacity) through their Talent Identification program in 1988, having had no former involvement with the sport, although Marcks had had a successful career as a junior athlete.

Rowing in Canberra Rowing club colours in an AIS composite crew she contested the women's U19 coxless four title at the 1990 Australian Rowing Championships. In 1991 she first competed at the national level with Kate Slatter when they contested the Australian women's pair championship title in an AIS composite crew. That same year she won her first national championship titles with Kate Slatter – the open women's coxless four and the women's eight in AIS crews but wearing Canberra Rowing Club colours.

In 1993 she was selected in the New South Wales' state women's coxless four to contest the ULVA Trophy at the Interstate Regatta within the Australian Rowing Championships. She raced in further New South Wales women's coxless fours in 1994 and 1995 and stroked the 1994 crew. In 1996 she stroked an ACT crew selected to compete for the ULVA Trophy.

== International representative rowing ==
Marcks' first Australian representative selection came at age eighteen when she was selected in 1990 in the women's junior eight to contest the 1990 Junior World Rowing Championships in Aiguebelette, France. The eight rowed to fourth place. In 1991, only her third year of rowing she was elevated to the Australian senior women's squad and selected in the women's coxless four with Jodie Dobson, Emmy Snook and Kate Slatter to compete at the 1991 World Rowing Championships in Vienna. All four girls doubled up in the Australian women's eight.

The coxless four stayed together into the 1992 Olympic year and were selected to compete at the 1992 Barcelona Olympics. They had to defeat France in a qualification regatta to get through. Then in the Olympic lead-up Marcks suffered a stress fracture of the rib affecting the crew's preparation. They made the Olympic final in the coxless four, a good result given their lack of international racing experience but finished in overall sixth place.

With Snook and Dobson changed out for Courtney Johnstone and Gina Douglas, Slatter and Marcks stayed together in the coxless four into 1993 and they competed at the 1993 World Rowing Championships in Racice where again they were last in the A final and achieved a sixth place. At the 1994 World Rowing Championships Slatter and Marcks were still in the coxless four and now with Alison Davies and Tory Toogood they rowed to a bronze medal. All four girls backed up in the Australian women's eight and with Marcks in the three seat, they rowed to a sixth place finish.

In 1995 in their fifth year of rowing together Slatter and Marcks stepped into the Australian women's coxed pair. They were about to make Australian women's rowing history. At the 1995 World Rowing Championships in Tampere they won their heat, semi and the final claimed a world championship title and put their opponents on notice as to their Olympics aspirations. They also doubled up in the engine room – seated at three and four – of the women's eight who placed ninth overall.

At the 1996 Atlanta Olympics, Still and Slatter in the coxless pair prevailed over the American crew with a 0.39 seconds margin to claim the first Olympic title by an Australian women’s crew. The girls' gold medal was matched by the Oarsome Foursome of Ginn, Tomkins, McKay, Green and was supplemented by a silver medal from the men’s coxless pair making it the best day for Australian rowing at an Olympic regatta until 2008.

== Rowing palmares ==
- 1990 Junior World Championships-France, Women's Eight: 4th
- 1992 Olympics-Barcelona, Women's Four: 6th
- 1993 World Championships-Czech Republic, Women's Four: 6th
- 1994 World Championships-Indianapolis, Women's Four: 3rd
- 1994 Commonwealth Games Regatta-Canada, Women's Four: 2nd
- 1994 Commonwealth Games Regatta-Canada, Women's Eight: 2nd
- 1995 World Championships-Finland, Women's Pair: 1st
- 1996 Olympics-Atlanta, Women's Pair: 1st

== Post retirement rowing honours ==
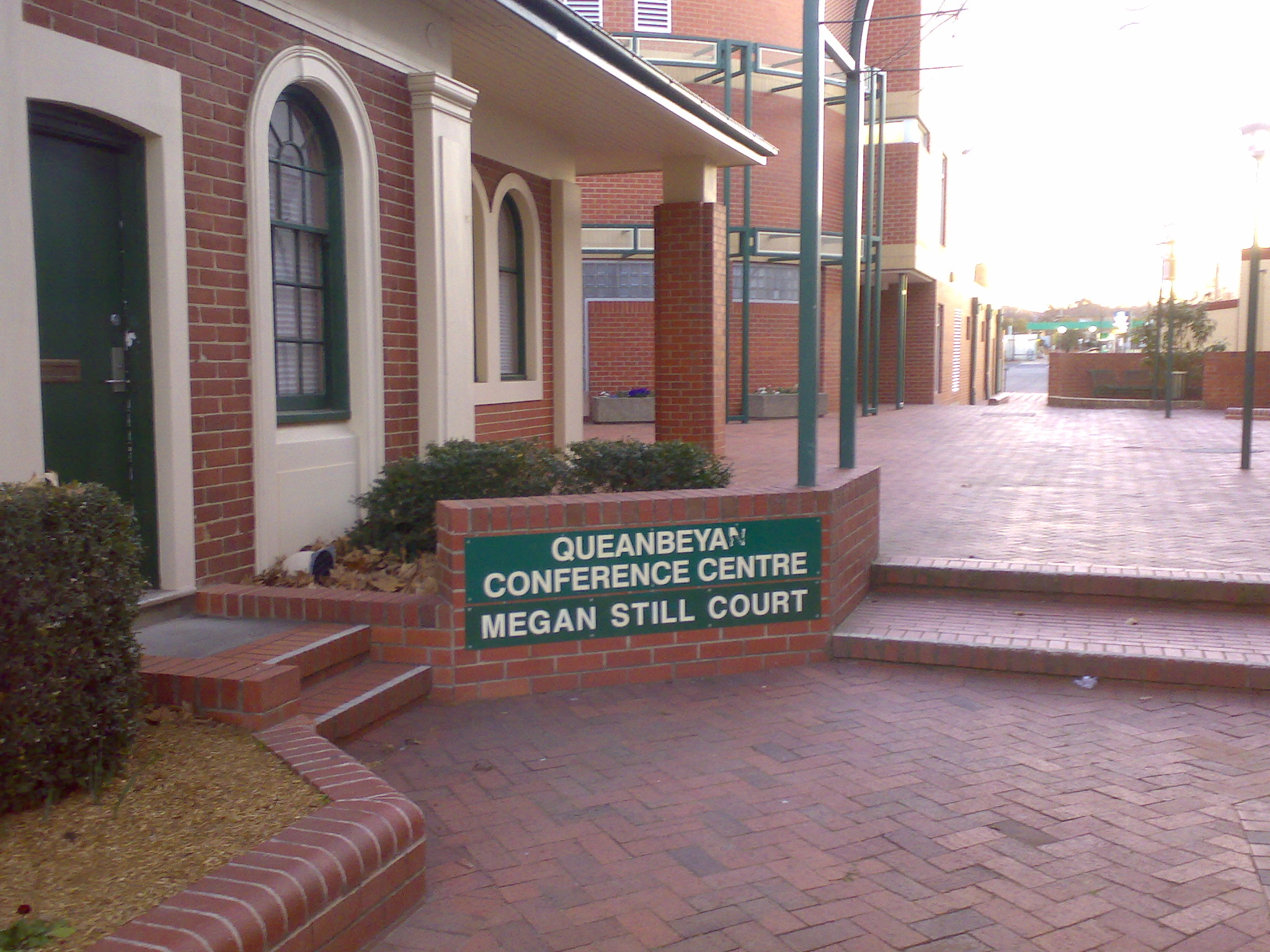
Queanbeyan's "Megan Still Court" immediately adjacent the City Council Chambers

- 1997: Medal of the Order of Australia
- 2000: Australian Sports Medal
- 2003: Sport Australia Hall of Fame inductee

Marcks is honoured within her home city of Queanbeyan (New South Wales, Australia) by the naming of "Megan Still Court", located adjacent to the Queanbeyan–Palerang Regional Council chambers. She retired from the sport in 1997. She is married, has a daughter and a son and works with the ACT Academy of Sport on talent programs. Inaugural inductee to University of Canberra Sport Walk of Fame in 2022.
