= Germany at the 1996 Summer Olympics =

- IOC code: GER
- NOC: National Olympic Committee for Germany

in Atlanta, United States 19 July–4 August 1996
- Competitors: 465 (278 men, 187 women) in 26 sports
- Flag bearer: Arnd Schmitt (fencing)
- Medals Ranked 3rd: Gold 20 Silver 18 Bronze 27 Total 65

Summer Olympics appearances (overview)
- 1896; 1900; 1904; 1908; 1912; 1920–1924; 1928; 1932; 1936; 1948; 1952; 1956–1988; 1992; 1996; 2000; 2004; 2008; 2012; 2016; 2020; 2024; 2028

Other related appearances
- 1906 Intercalated Games –––– Saar (1952); United Team of Germany (1956–1964); East Germany (1968–1988); West Germany (1968–1988)

Germany competed at the 1996 Summer Olympics in Atlanta, United States. 465 competitors, 278 men and 187 women, took part in 234 events in 26 sports.

== Medalists ==
Medal	Name	Sport	Event	Date
Gold	Christian Klees	Shooting	Men's 50 metre rifle prone	25 July
Gold	Ralf Schumann	Shooting	Men's 25 metre rapid fire pistol	25 July
Gold	Udo Quellmalz	Judo	Men's 65 kg	25 July
Gold	Jana Sorgers; Katrin Rutschow; Kathrin Boron; Kerstin Köppen	Rowing	Women's quadruple sculls	28 July
Gold	André Steiner; Andreas Hajek; Stephan Volkert; André Willms	Rowing	Men's quadruple sculls	28 July
Gold	Oliver Fix	Canoeing	Men's slalom K-1	28 July
Gold	Jens Fiedler	Cycling	Men's sprint	28 July
Gold	Isabell Werth; Monica Theodorescu; Klaus Balkenhol; Martin Schaudt	Equestrian	Team dressage	28 July
Gold	Ilke Wyludda	Athletics	Women's discus throw	29 July
Gold	Andreas Wecker	Gymnastics	Men's horizontal bar	29 July
Gold	Lars Riedel	Athletics	Men's discus throw	31 July
Gold	Ludger Beerbaum; Ulrich Kirchhoff; Lars Nieberg; Franke Sloothaak	Equestrian	Team jumping	1 August
Gold	Jochen Schümann; Thomas Flach; Bernd Jäkel	Sailing	Soling	2 August
Gold	Astrid Kumbernuss	Athletics	Women's shot put	2 August
Gold	Ramona Portwich; Manuela Mucke; Birgit Fischer; Anett Schuck	Canoeing	Women's K-4 500 metres	3 August
Gold	Andreas Dittmer; Gunar Kirchbach	Canoeing	Men's C-2 1000 metres	3 August
Gold	Detlef Hofmann; Olaf Winter; Thomas Reineck; Mark Zabel	Canoeing	Men's K-4 1000 metres	3 August
Gold	Isabell Werth	Equestrian	Individual dressage	3 August
Gold	Kay Bluhm; Torsten Gutsche	Canoeing	Men's K-2 500 metres	4 August
Gold	Ulrich Kirchhoff	Equestrian	Individual jumping	4 August
Silver	Petra Horneber	Shooting	Women's 10 metre air rifle	20 July
Silver	Sandra Völker	Swimming	Women's 100 metre freestyle	20 July
Silver	Thomas Zander	Wrestling	Men's Greco-Roman 82 kg	21 July
Silver	Franziska van Almsick	Swimming	Women's 200 metre freestyle	21 July
Silver	Dagmar Hase	Swimming	Women's 400 metre freestyle	22 July
Silver	Susanne Kiermayer	Shooting	Women's double trap	23 July
Silver	Dagmar Hase	Swimming	Women's 800 metre freestyle	25 July
Silver	Franziska van Almsick; Kerstin Kielgaß; Anke Scholz; Dagmar Hase; Simone Osygus (*); Meike Freitag (*)	Swimming	Women's 4 × 200 metre freestyle relay	25 July
Silver	Marc Huster	Weightlifting	Men's 83 kg	26 July
Silver	Annika Walter	Diving	Women's 10 metre platform	27 July
Silver	Frank Richter; Mark Kleinschmidt; Wolfram Huhn; Marc Weber; Detlef Kirchhoff; Thorsten Streppelhoff; Ulrich Viefers; Roland Baar; Peter Thiede	Rowing	Men's eight	28 July
Silver	Ronny Weller	Weightlifting	Men's +108 kg	30 July
Silver	Frank Busemann	Athletics	Men's decathlon	1 August
Silver	Barbara Mensing; Cornelia Pfohl; Sandra Wagner	Archery	Women's team	2 August
Silver	Jan Hempel	Diving	Men's 10 metre platform	2 August
Silver	Kay Bluhm; Torsten Gutsche	Canoeing	Men's K-2 1000 metres	3 August
Silver	Ramona Portwich; Birgit Fischer	Canoeing	Women's K-2 500 metres	4 August
Silver	Oktay Urkal	Boxing	Light welterweight	4 August
Bronze	Johanna Hagn	Judo	Women's +72 kg	20 July
Bronze	Frank Möller	Judo	Men's +95 kg	20 July
Bronze	Mark Warnecke	Swimming	Men's 100 metre breaststroke	20 July
Bronze	Dagmar Hase	Swimming	Women's 200 metre freestyle	21 July
Bronze	Aimo Heilmann; Christian Keller; Christian Tröger; Steffen Zesner; Konstantin Dubrovin (*); Oliver Lampe (*)	Swimming	Men's 4 × 200 metre freestyle relay	21 July
Bronze	Marko Spittka	Judo	Men's 86 kg	22 July
Bronze	Sandra Völker; Simone Osygus; Antje Buschschulte; Franziska van Almsick; Meike Freitag (*)	Swimming	Women's 4 × 100 metre freestyle relay	22 July
Bronze	Maik Bullmann	Wrestling	Men's Greco-Roman 90 kg	23 July
Bronze	Christian Tröger; Bengt Zikarsky; Björn Zikarsky; Mark Pinger; Alexander Lüderitz (*)	Swimming	Men's 4 × 100 metre freestyle relay	23 July
Bronze	Anja Fichtel-Mauritz; Monika Weber-Koszto; Sabine Bau	Fencing	Women's team foil	25 July
Bronze	Cathleen Rund	Swimming	Women's 200 metre backstroke	25 July
Bronze	Richard Trautmann	Judo	Men's 60 kg	26 July
Bronze	Sandra Völker	Swimming	Women's 50 metre freestyle	26 July
Bronze	Thomas Lange	Rowing	Men's single sculls	27 July
Bronze	Oliver Caruso	Weightlifting	Men's 91 kg	27 July
Bronze	André Ehrenberg; Michael Senft	Canoeing	Men's slalom C-2	28 July
Bronze	Thomas Becker	Canoeing	Men's slalom K-1	28 July
Bronze	Judith Arndt	Cycling	Women's individual pursuit	28 July
Bronze	Florian Schwarthoff	Athletics	Men's 110 metres hurdles	29 July
Bronze	Arawat Sabejew	Wrestling	Men's freestyle 100 kg	31 July
Bronze	Jörg Roßkopf	Table tennis	Men's singles	1 August
Bronze	Marc-Kevin Goellner; David Prinosil	Tennis	Men's doubles	1 August
Bronze	Luan Krasniqi	Boxing	Heavyweight	1 August
Bronze	Andrej Tiwontschik	Athletics	Men's pole vault	2 August
Bronze	Zoltan Lunka	Boxing	Flyweight	2 August
Bronze	Thomas Ulrich	Boxing	Light heavyweight	2 August
Bronze	Uta Rohländer; Linda Kisabaka; Anja Rücker; Grit Breuer	Athletics	Women's 4 × 400 metres relay	3 August

== Competitors ==
The following is the list of number of competitors in the Games.

Sport	Men	Women	Total
Archery	0	3	3
Athletics	49	36	85
Badminton	3	3	6
Boxing	8	–	8
Canoeing	21	6	27
Cycling	14	4	18
Diving	3	4	7
Equestrian	12	4	16
Fencing	9	6	15
Field hockey	16	16	32
Football	0	15	15
Gymnastics	7	10	17
Handball	15	15	30
Judo	7	6	13
Rowing	28	20	48
Sailing	12	3	15
Shooting	17	5	22
Swimming	16	12	28
Table tennis	3	4	7
Tennis	2	1	3
Volleyball	2	14	16
Water polo	13	–	13
Weightlifting	10	–	10
Wrestling	12	–	12
Total	279	187	466

== Archery ==
In Germany's sixth archery competition, the German women's team won the silver medal. Germany's highest placing individual was Barbara Mensing, who advanced to the quarterfinal before being defeated. No Germany men competed in Atlanta.

Women

Athlete	Event	Ranking round		Round of 64	Round of 32	Round of 16	Quarterfinals	Semifinals	Final / BM	
Athlete	Event	Score	Seed	Opposition Score	Opposition Score	Opposition Score	Opposition Score	Opposition Score	Opposition Score	Rank
Barbara Mensing	Individual	632	42	Tutatchikova (RUS); W 150–145	Lantang (INA); W 144–141	Valeeva (MDA); W 163–158	He (CHN); L 93–103	Did not advance		
Cornelia Pfohl	Individual	621	47	Zabugina (BLR); L 152–158	Did not advance					
Sandra Wagner	Individual	640	24	Lin (TPE); L 158–162	Did not advance					
Barbara Mensing; Cornelia Pfohl; Sandra Wagner	Team	1893	11	—N/a		Italy; W 245–236	China; W 232–231	Turkey; W 239–237	South Korea; L 235–245	2nd place, silver medalist(s)

== Athletics ==
Men
Track and road events

Athlete	Event	Heats		Quarterfinal		Semifinal		Final	
Athlete	Event	Result	Rank	Result	Rank	Result	Rank	Result	Rank
Marc Blume	100 metres	10.33	23 Q	10.33	26	Did not advance			
Joachim Dehmel	800 metres	1:47.12	25	—N/a		Did not advance			
Nico Motchebon	800 metres	1:45.82	7 Q	—N/a		1:45.40	8 Q	1:43.91	5
Michael Gottschalk	1500 metres	3:56.46	53	—N/a		Did not advance			
Dieter Baumann	5000 metres	13:52.00	6 Q	—N/a		14:03.75	12 Q	13:08.81	4
Stéphane Franke	5000 metres	14:06.34	27 q	—N/a		13:40.94	9 q	13:44.64	14
Stéphane Franke	10,000 metres	28:24.30	17 Q	—N/a				27:59.08	9
Konrad Dobler	Marathon	—N/a						2:21:12	48
Stephan Freigang	Marathon	—N/a						DNF	
Claude Edorh	110 metres hurdles	13.74	28 q	13.64	23	Did not advance			
Eric Kaiser	110 metres hurdles	13.64	17 Q	DNF	q	13.59	14	Did not advance	
Florian Schwarthoff	110 metres hurdles	13.39	5 Q	13.27	2 Q	13.13	2 Q	13.17	3rd place, bronze medalist(s)
Kim Bauermeister	3000 metres steeplechase	8:36.86	23 q	—N/a		8:51.83	24	Did not advance	
Steffen Brand	3000 metres steeplechase	8:31.18	12 Q	—N/a		8:19.11	3 Q	8:18.52	6
Martin Strege	3000 metres steeplechase	8:32.76	21 Q	—N/a		8:27.99	12 Q	8:30.31	10
Michael Huke; Marc Blume; Holger Blume; Florian Schwarthoff; Andreas Ruth (*)	4 × 100 metres relay	38.77	3 Q	—N/a		DNF		Did not advance	
Rico Lieder; Andreas Hein; Kai Karsten; Thomas Schönlebe	4 × 400 metres relay	3:05.16	17	—N/a		Did not advance			
Nischan Daimer	20 kilometres walk	—N/a						1:23:23	14
Andreas Erm	20 kilometres walk	—N/a						1:25:08	23
Robert Ihly	20 kilometres walk	—N/a						1:23:47	16
Axel Noack	50 kilometres walk	—N/a						3:51:55	12
Thomas Wallstab	50 kilometres walk	—N/a						3:54:48	15
Ronald Weigel	50 kilometres walk	—N/a						DNF	

Field events

Athlete	Event	Qualification		Final	
Athlete	Event	Distance	Position	Distance	Position
Wolfgang Kreißig	High jump	2.28	11 Q	2.29	9
Tim Lobinger	Pole vault	5.70	1 Q	5.80	7
Michael Stolle	Pole vault	5.70	10 Q	5.70	9
Andrej Tiwontschik	Pole vault	5.70	9 Q	5.92	3rd place, bronze medalist(s)
Georg Ackermann	Long jump	7.86	21	Did not advance	
Hans-Peter Lott	Long jump	NM		Did not advance	
Charles Friedek	Triple jump	16.71	14	Did not advance	
Oliver-Sven Buder	Shot put	20.43	3 Q	20.51	5
Michael Mertens	Shot put	19.07	16	Did not advance	
Dirk Urban	Shot put	19.39	13	Did not advance	
Michael Möllenbeck	Discus throw	55.18	35	Did not advance	
Lars Riedel	Discus throw	64.66	1 Q	69.40 OR	1st place, gold medalist(s)
Jürgen Schult	Discus throw	62.58	8 Q	64.62	6
Claus Dethloff	Hammer throw	74.60	14	Did not advance	
Karsten Kobs	Hammer throw	74.20	18	Did not advance	
Heinz Weis	Hammer throw	77.84	4 Q	79.78	5
Peter Blank	Javelin throw	82.68	9 q	81.82	9
Raymond Hecht	Javelin throw	83.24	7 Q	86.88	4
Boris Henry	Javelin throw	83.22	8 Q	85.68	5

Combined events – Decathlon

Athlete	Event	100 m	LJ	SP	HJ	400 m	110H	DT	PV	JT	1500 m	Final	Rank
Frank Busemann	Result	10.60	8.07 OB	13.60	2.04	48.34	13.47 OB	45.04	4.80	66.86	4:31.41	8706	2nd place, silver medalist(s)
Frank Busemann	Points	952	1079	704	840	893	1044	768	849	842	735	8706	2nd place, silver medalist(s)
Frank Müller	Result	10.95	7.25	14.69	1.95	49.05	14.86	45.90	5.10	66.10	4:37.50	8253	14
Frank Müller	Points	872	874	771	758	859	867	785	941	830	696	8253	14
Dirk-Achim Pajonk	Result	10.67	7.50	14.46	1.95	48.81	14.79	41.94	4.50	54.16	4:21.62	8045	20
Dirk-Achim Pajonk	Points	935	935	757	758	870	875	704	760	650	801	8045	20

Women
Track and road events

Athlete	Event	Heats		Quarterfinal		Semifinal		Final	
Athlete	Event	Result	Rank	Result	Rank	Result	Rank	Result	Rank
Silke Lichtenhagen	100 metres	11.30	14 Q	11.53	25	Did not advance			
Melanie Paschke	100 metres	11.27	13 Q	11.18	8 Q	11.14	10	Did not advance	
Andrea Philipp	100 metres	11.32	15 Q	11.38	17	Did not advance			
Melanie Paschke	200 metres	22.93	11 Q	22.84	12 Q	22.81	12	Did not advance	
Grit Breuer	400 metres	52.20	19 Q	50.57	2 Q	50.75	8 Q	50.71	8
Linda Kisabaka	800 metres	1:59.56	8 q	—N/a		1:59.23	11	Did not advance	
Sylvia Kühnemund	1500 metres	4:14.35	23 q	—N/a		4:16.85	21	Did not advance	
Carmen Wüstenhagen	1500 metres	4:10.06	12 Q	—N/a		4:11.47	15	Did not advance	
Claudia Lokar	5000 metres	15:28.35	16	—N/a				Did not advance	
Petra Wassiluk	5000 metres	15:37.73	19	—N/a				Did not advance	
Kathrin Weßel	10,000 metres	33:31.67	28	—N/a				Did not advance	
Katrin Dörre-Heinig	Marathon	—N/a						2:28:45	4
Sonja Krolik	Marathon	—N/a						2:31:16	8
Uta Pippig	Marathon	—N/a						DNF	
Kristin Patzwahl	100 metres hurdles	12.98	16 Q	12.91	13 Q	13.05	15	Did not advance	
Birgit Wolf	100 metres hurdles	13.16	27 q	13.08	26	Did not advance			
Heike Meißner	400 metres hurdles	55.05	4 Q	—N/a		54.27	4 Q	54.03	5
Silvia Rieger	400 metres hurdles	55.33	8 Q	—N/a		54.27	4 Q	54.57	8
Andrea Philipp; Silke Lichtenhagen; Melanie Paschke; Silke Knoll	4 × 100 metres relay	DNF		—N/a				Did not advance	
Uta Rohländer; Linda Kisabaka; Anja Rücker; Grit Breuer	4 × 400 metres relay	3:24.08	3 Q	—N/a				3:21.14	3rd place, bronze medalist(s)
Kathrin Boyde	10 kilometres walk	—N/a						44:50	15
Beate Gummelt	10 kilometres walk	—N/a						DQ	

Field events

Athlete	Event	Qualification		Final	
Athlete	Event	Distance	Position	Distance	Position
Alina Astafei	High jump	1.93	1 q	1.96	5
Petra Lobinger	Triple jump	NM		Did not advance	
Astrid Kumbernuss	Shot put	19.93	1 Q	20.56	1st place, gold medalist(s)
Kathrin Neimke	Shot put	19.02	8 Q	18.92	7
Stephanie Storp	Shot put	19.29	3 Q	19.06	6
Franka Dietzsch	Discus throw	63.94	3 Q	65.48	4
Anja Gündler	Discus throw	63.80	4 Q	61.16	11
Ilke Wyludda	Discus throw	66.78	1 Q	69.66	1st place, gold medalist(s)
Karen Forkel	Javelin throw	60.84	11 q	64.18	6
Steffi Nerius	Javelin throw	60.98	10 q	60.20	9
Silke Renk	Javelin throw	59.70	13	Did not advance	

Combined event – Heptathlon

Athlete	Event	100H	HJ	SP	200 m	LJ	JT	800 m	Total	Rank
Peggy Beer	Result	13.52	1.74	13.65	24.64	6.09	46.72	2:13.15	6234	13
Peggy Beer	Points	1047	903	771	920	877	797	919	6234	13
Sabine Braun	Result	13.55	1.83	14.48	24.89	6.21	48.72	2:22.87	6317	7
Sabine Braun	Points	1043	1016	826	897	915	835	785	6317	7
Mona Steigauf	Result	13.22	1.77	12.35	24.50	6.47	42.40	2:15.44	6246	11
Mona Steigauf	Points	1091	941	684	933	997	713	887	6246	11

== Badminton ==
Men

Athlete	Event	Round of 64	Round of 32	Round of 16	Quarterfinals	Semifinals	Final	
Athlete	Event	Opposition Result	Opposition Result	Opposition Result	Opposition Result	Opposition Result	Opposition Result	Rank
Michael Helber	Singles	Korshuk (BLR); W 15–12, 15–1	Liu (TPE); L 15–8, 0–15, 2–15	Did not advance				
Oliver Pongratz	Singles	Yu (CHN); L 5–15, 15–12, 1–15	Did not advance					
Michael Helber; Michael Keck	Doubles	—N/a	Axelsson / Jönsson (SWE); W 15–8, 15–13	Antropov / Zuyev (RUS); L 1–15, 7–15	Did not advance			

Women

Athlete	Event	Round of 64	Round of 32	Round of 16	Quarterfinals	Semifinals	Final	
Athlete	Event	Opposition Result	Opposition Result	Opposition Result	Opposition Result	Opposition Result	Opposition Result	Rank
Katrin Schmidt; Kerstin Ubben	Doubles	—N/a	de Souza / Jean-Pierre (MRI); W 15–1, 15–2	Ge / Gu (CHN); L 3–15, 6–15	Did not advance			

Mixed

Athlete	Event	Round of 64	Round of 32	Round of 16	Quarterfinals	Semifinals	Final	
Athlete	Event	Opposition Result	Opposition Result	Opposition Result	Opposition Result	Opposition Result	Opposition Result	Rank
Karen Stechmann; Michael Keck	Doubles	—N/a	Wright / Ponting (GBR); L 10–15, 14–18	Did not advance				

== Boxing ==
Athlete	Event	Round of 32	Round of 16	Quarterfinals	Semifinals	Final	
Athlete	Event	Opposition Result	Opposition Result	Opposition Result	Opposition Result	Opposition Result	Rank
Zoltan Lunka	Flyweight	Castillo (MEX); W 13–7	Ballo (INA); W 18–12	Assous (ALG); W 19–6	Jumadilov (KAZ); L 18–23	Did not advance	3rd place, bronze medalist(s)
Falk Huste	Featherweight	Burke (GBR); W 13–9	Ibragimov (UZB); W 8–4	Todorov (BUL); L 6–14	Did not advance		
Oktay Urkal	Light welterweight	Galido (PHI); W 19–2	Diaz (USA); W 14–6	Mouchi (FRA); W 19–10	Missaoui (TUN); W 20–6	Vinent (CUB); L 13–20	2nd place, silver medalist(s)
Markus Beyer	Light middleweight	Vaștag (ROU); W 17–12	Mizsei (HUN); W 14–6	Ibraimov (KAZ); L 9–19	Did not advance		
Sven Ottke	Middleweight	Mendy (FRA); W 11–4	Hernández (CUB); L 0–5	Did not advance			
Thomas Ulrich	Light heavyweight	Timperi (AUS); W 21–7	Koné (SWE); W 24–9	Bispo (BRA); W 14–7	Lee (KOR); L 8–12	Did not advance	3rd place, bronze medalist(s)
Luan Krasniqi	Heavyweight	Chagaev (UZB); W 12–4	Kshinin (RUS); W 10–2	Dychkov (BLR); W 10–5	Savón (CUB); L walkover	Did not advance	3rd place, bronze medalist(s)
René Monse	Super heavyweight	Bye	El-Said (EGY); W 12–9	Lezin (RUS); L 5–9	Did not advance		

== Canoeing ==
=== Slalom ===
Athlete	Event	Run 1	Rank	Run 2	Rank	Best	Rank
Vitus Husek	Men's C-1	167.48	14	164.29	7	164.29	12
Sören Kaufmann	Men's C-1	168.43	15	177.25	15	168.43	17
Martin Lang	Men's C-1	159.91	5	167.24	11	159.91	7
Manfred Berro; Michael Trummer	Men's C-2	180.55	6	163.72	4	163.72	4
André Ehrenberg; Michael Senft	Men's C-2	167.33	1	163.72	3	163.72	3rd place, bronze medalist(s)
Thomas Becker	Men's K-1	144.48	2	142.79	2	142.79	3rd place, bronze medalist(s)
Oliver Fix	Men's K-1	141.22	1	209.75	37	141.22	1st place, gold medalist(s)
Jochen Lettmann	Men's K-1	145.99	5	150.97	12	145.99	8
Elisabeth Micheler-Jones	Women's K-1	176.56	5	461.73	29	176.56	10
Kordula Striepecke	Women's K-1	326.63	24	176.98	8	176.98	11

=== Sprint ===
Men

Athlete	Event	Heats		Repechage		Semifinals		Final	
Athlete	Event	Time	Rank	Time	Rank	Time	Rank	Time	Rank
Thomas Zereske	C-1 500 metres	1:53.840	1 F	—N/a		Bye		1:52.358	5
Patrick Schulze	C-1 1000 metres	4:21.114	2 F	—N/a		Bye		3:57.778	4
Andreas Dittmer; Gunar Kirchbach	C-2 500 metres	1:45.145	2 SF	Bye		1:43.650	2 F	1:41.760	4
Andreas Dittmer; Gunar Kirchbach	C-2 1000 metres	4:00.851	1 F	—N/a		Bye		3:31.870	1st place, gold medalist(s)
Lutz Liwowski	K-1 500 metres	1:41.079	2 SF	Bye		1:40.319	1 F	1:39.307	5
Lutz Liwowski	K-1 1000 metres	3:44.776	3 SF	Bye		3:42.657	3 F	3:30.025	4
Kay Bluhm; Torsten Gutsche	K-2 500 metres	1:31.361	1 SF	Bye		1:29.883	1 F	1:28.697	1st place, gold medalist(s)
Kay Bluhm; Torsten Gutsche	K-2 1000 metres	3:39.388	1 SF	Bye		3:19.394	3 F	3:10.518	2nd place, silver medalist(s)
Detlef Hofmann; Olaf Winter; Thomas Reineck; Mark Zabel	K-4 1000 metres	3:07.908	1 F	—N/a		Bye		2:51.528	1st place, gold medalist(s)

Women

Athlete	Event	Heats		Repechage		Semifinals		Final	
Athlete	Event	Time	Rank	Time	Rank	Time	Rank	Time	Rank
Birgit Fischer	K-1 500 metres	1:54.880	3 SF	Bye		1:51.863	3 F	1:49.383	4
Ramona Portwich; Birgit Fischer	K-2 500 metres	1:45.504	1 SF	Bye		1:43.069	2 F	1:39.689	2nd place, silver medalist(s)
Ramona Portwich; Manuela Mucke; Birgit Fischer; Anett Schuck	K-4 500 metres	1:37.895	1 F	—N/a		Bye		1:31.077 OB	1st place, gold medalist(s)

== Cycling ==
=== Road ===
Men

Athlete	Event	Time	Rank
Rolf Aldag	Road race	4:56:44	28
Olaf Ludwig	Road race	4:56:32	16
Uwe Peschel	Road race	DNF	
Uwe Peschel	Time trial	1:07:33	12
Michael Rich	Road race	DNF	
Michael Rich	Time trial	1:07:08	10
Erik Zabel	Road race	4:56:43	20

Women

Athlete	Event	Time	Rank
Vera Hohlfeld	Road race	2:37:06	4

=== Track ===
Sprint

Athlete	Event	Qualification		Round 1	Repechage	Round 2	Repechage 2	Round of 16	rRepechage 3	Quarterfinals	Semifinals	Final	
Athlete	Event	Time Speed (km/h)	Rank	Opposition Time Speed (km/h)	Opposition Time Speed (km/h)	Opposition Time Speed (km/h)	Opposition Time Speed (km/h)	Opposition Time Speed (km/h)	Opposition Time Speed (km/h)	Opposition Time Speed (km/h)	Opposition Time Speed (km/h)	Opposition Time Speed (km/h)	Rank
Jens Fiedler	Men's sprint	10.232	4	Capitano (ITA); W 11.722	Bye	Escuredo (ESP); W 10.597	Bye	Bērziņš (LAT); W 10.808	Bye	Rousseau (FRA); W, W	Neiwand (AUS); W, W	Nothstein (USA); W, W	1st place, gold medalist(s)
Eyk Pokorny	Men's sprint	10.233	5	Bazálik (SVK); W 10.995	Bye	Moreno (ESP); W 10.966	Bye	Rousseau (FRA); L	Chiappa (ITA), Moreno (ESP); W 10.982	Neiwand (AUS); L, L	Did not advance	Hill (AUS), Magné (FRA), Rousseau (FRA); L	7
Annett Neumann	Women's sprint	11.536	6 Q	Paraskevin-Young (USA); W 12.078	Bye	—N/a				Grishina (RUS); L, W, W	Ballanger (FRA); L, L	Haringa (NED); W, L, L	4

Time trial

Athlete	Event	Time	Rank
Sören Lausberg	Time trial	1:03.514	4

Pursuit

Athlete	Event	Qualification		Quarterfinals	Semifinals	Final	
Athlete	Event	Time	Rank	Opposition Time	Opposition Time	Opposition Time	Rank
Heiko Szonn	Men's individual pursuit	4:29.931	6 Q	Markov (RUS); L 4:31.583	Did not advance		
Judith Arndt	Women's individual pursuit	3:40.335	5 Q	Twigg (USA); W 3:38.898	Clignet (FRA); L 3:38.744	Did not advance	3rd place, bronze medalist(s)
Robert Bartko; Guido Fulst; Danilo Hondo; Heiko Szonn	Men's team pursuit	4:15.140	9	Did not advance			

Points race

Athlete	Event	Laps	Points	Rank
Guido Fulst	Men's points race	–1 lap	7	10
Judith Arndt	Women's points race	±0 laps	2	13

=== Mountain biking ===
Athlete	Event	Time	Rank
Ralph Berner	Men's cross-country	2:27:43	10
Mike Kluge	Men's cross-country	DNF	
Regina Marunde	Women's cross-country	1:57:21	7

== Diving ==
Men

Athlete	Event	Preliminary		Semifinal		Final	
Athlete	Event	Points	Rank	Points	Rank	Points	Rank
Jan Hempel	3 metre springboard	358.26	13 Q	578.25	10 Q	622.32	7
Andreas Wels	3 metre springboard	405.33	5 Q	612.54	6 Q	583.56	12
Jan Hempel	10 metre platform	394.17	7 Q	591.39	5 Q	663.27	2nd place, silver medalist(s)
Michael Kühne	10 metre platform	375.27	11 Q	544.38	11 Q	583.98	8

Women

Athlete	Event	Preliminary		Semifinal		Final	
Athlete	Event	Points	Rank	Points	Rank	Points	Rank
Claudia Bockner	3 metre springboard	281.31	5 Q	481.50	8 Q	455.70	11
Simona Koch	3 metre springboard	239.91	16 Q	444.90	16	Did not advance	
Annika Walter	10 metre platform	298.11	5 Q	464.25	5 Q	479.22	2nd place, silver medalist(s)
Ute Wetzig	10 metre platform	258.93	11 Q	410.37	11 Q	367.35	12

== Equestrian ==
=== Dressage ===
Athlete	Horse	Event	Grand Prix		Grand Prix Special			Grand Prix Freestyle		Overall	
Athlete	Horse	Event	Score	Rank	Score	Total	Rank	Score	Rank	Score	Rank
Klaus Balkenhol	Goldstern	Individual	71.72	6 Q	73.81	145.53	6 Q	76.28	5	221.81	6
Martin Schaudt	Durgo	Individual	71.24	8 Q	70.98	142.22	9 Q	70.53	12	212.75	9
Monica Theodorescu	Grunox	Individual	73.80	5 Q	73.91	147.71	5 Q	76.85	3	224.56	4
Nicole Uphoff-Becker	Rembrandt	Individual	70.04	9 Q	73.02	143.06	8 Q	DNS			
Isabell Werth	Gigolo	Individual	76.60	1 Q	75.49	152.09	2 Q	83.00	1	235.09	1st place, gold medalist(s)
Klaus Balkenhol; Martin Schaudt; Monica Theodorescu; Isabell Werth	Goldstern	Team	5553	1	—N/a					5553	1st place, gold medalist(s)

=== Eventing ===
Athlete	Horse	Event	Dressage		Cross-country			Jumping		Total	
Athlete	Horse	Event	Penalties	Rank	Penalties	Total	Rank	Penalties	Rank	Penalties	Rank
Herbert Blöcker	Kiwi Dream	Individual	42.40	6	111.20	153.60	18	6.50	8	160.10	16
Peter Thomsen	White Girl 3	Individual	53.60	18	Withdrawn						
Hendrik von Paepcke	Amadeus 18	Individual	56.20	23	26.00	82.20	10	5.00	5	87.20	7
Bodo Battenberg; Jürgen Blum; Ralf Ehrenbrink; Bettina Overesch-Böker	Sam the Man; Brownie McGee; Connection L Watermill Stream	Team	145.00	5	1091.60	1192.40	EL	11.75	EL	1204.15	9

=== Jumping ===
Athlete	Horse	Event	Qualification								Final					
Athlete	Horse	Event	Round 1		Round 2		Round 3		Total		Round 1		Round 2		Total	
Athlete	Horse	Event	Score	Rank	Score	Rank	Score	Rank	Score	Rank	Penalties	Rank	Penalties	Rank	Penalties	Rank
Ludger Beerbaum	Ratina Z	Individual	0.00	1	0.00	1	0.25	10	0.25	1	Did not start					
Ulrich Kirchhoff	Jus de Pommes	Individual	4.00	14	0.75	10	0.75	12	5.50	5 Q	0.00	1	1.00	6	1.00	1st place, gold medalist(s)
Lars Nieberg	For Pleasure	Individual	8.00	40	0.00	1	12.00	47	20.00	29 q	0.00	1	16.00	24	16.00	20
Franke Sloothaak	Joly	Individual	4.00	14	60.25	75	DNF									
Ludger Beerbaum; Ulrich Kirchhoff; Lars Nieberg; Franke Sloothaak	See above	Team	—N/a								0.75	1	1.00	1	1.75	1st place, gold medalist(s)

== Fencing ==
15 fencers, 9 men and 6 women, represented Germany in 1996.

Men

Athlete	Event	Round of 64	Round of 32	Round of 16	Quarterfinals	Semifinals	Final	
Athlete	Event	Opposition Result	Opposition Result	Opposition Result	Opposition Result	Opposition Result	Opposition Result	Rank
Alexander Koch	Foil	Bye	Ye (CHN); L 13–15	Did not advance				
Uwe Römer	Foil	Bye	Wendt (AUT); W 15–7	Kim (KOR); L 13–15	Did not advance			
Wolfgang Wienand	Foil	Bye	Marchetti (ARG); W 15–1	Kiełpikowski (POL); W 15–11	Tucker (CUB); W 15–12	Plumenail (FRA); L 9–15	Boidin (FRA); L 11–15	4
Alexander Koch; Uwe Römer; Wolfgang Wienand	Team foil	—N/a		Bye	Poland; L 44–45	Italy; W 45–36	Hungary; L 44–45	6
Elmar Borrmann	Épée	Lee (KOR); W 15–14	Randazzo (ITA); W 15–14	Imre (HUN); L 14–15	Did not advance			
Arnd Schmitt	Épée	Bye	Chang (KOR); W 15–13	Trevejo (CUB); L 8–15	Did not advance			
Marius Strzalka	Épée	Pantelimon (ROU); W 15–12	Chouinard (CAN); W 15–12	Mazzoni (ITA); W 15–13	Kovács (HUN); L 13–15	Did not advance		
Elmar Borrmann; Arnd Schmitt; Marius Strzalka	Team épée	—N/a		Bye	Estonia; W 45–39	Italy; L 44–45	France; L 42–45	4
Felix Becker	Sabre	Bye	Cox Jr. (USA); W 15–12	Ducheix (FRA); W 15–8	Navarrete (HUN); L 7–15	Did not advance		
Frank Bleckmann	Sabre	Bye	Jaskot (POL); L 10–15	Did not advance				
Steffen Wiesinger	Sabre	Bye	Köves (HUN); W 15–10	Terenzi (ITA); W 15–8	Sharikov (RUS); L 6–15	Did not advance		
Felix Becker; Frank Bleckmann; Steffen Wiesinger	Team sabre	—N/a		Bye	Italy; L 42–45	Spain; L 34–45	Romania; L 42–45	8

Women

Athlete	Event	Round of 64	Round of 32	Round of 16	Quarterfinals	Semifinals	Final	
Athlete	Event	Opposition Result	Opposition Result	Opposition Result	Opposition Result	Opposition Result	Opposition Result	Rank
Sabine Bau	Foil	Bye	Ohayon (ISR); W 15–10	Marsh (USA); L 8–15	Did not advance			
Anja Fichtel-Mauritz	Foil	Bye	Liang (CHN); W 15–10	Mohamed (HUN); L 14–15	Did not advance			
Monika Weber-Koszto	Foil	Bye	Felusiak (POL); W 15–14	Czuckermann-Hatuel (ISR); W 15–13	Modaine-Cessac (FRA); L 14–15	Did not advance		
Sabine Bau; Anja Fichtel-Mauritz; Monika Weber-Koszto	Team foil	—N/a		Bye	Poland; W 45–35	Romania; L 33–45	Hungary; W 45–42	3rd place, bronze medalist(s)
Claudia Bokel	Épée	Bye	Sidiropoulou (GRE); W 15–10	Zalaffi (ITA); L 8–15	Did not advance			
Eva-Maria Ittner	Épée	Bye	Vybornova (UKR); W 15–7	Moressée-Pichot (FRA); W 15–10	Zalaffi (ITA); L 10–15	Did not advance		
Katja Nass	Épée	Bye	Rohi (EST); W 15–12	Hormay (HUN); L 9–15	Did not advance			
Claudia Bokel; Eva-Maria Ittner; Katja Nass	Team épée	—N/a		Bye	Russia; L 37–45	Cuba; L 40–45	United States; W 45–37	7

== Field hockey ==
Summary

Key:

- FT – After full time.
- P – Match decided by penalty-shootout.

Team	Event	Group stage								Semifinal	Final / BM	
Team	Event	Opposition Score	Opposition Score	Opposition Score	Opposition Score	Opposition Score	Opposition Score	Opposition Score	Rank	Opposition Score	Opposition Score	Rank
Germany men's	Men's tournament	Spain; L 0–1	India; D 1–1	Pakistan; W 3–1	Argentina; W 3–0	United States; W 3–0	—N/a		2 Q	Netherlands; L 1–3	Bronze Medal Match; Australia; L 2–3	4
Germany women's	Women's tournament	Argentina; W 2–0	Spain; W 2–1	Australia; L 0–1	Netherlands; L 3–4	United States; D 1–1	Great Britain; L 2–3	South Korea; L 0–1	6	Did not advance		6

=== Men's team competition ===
Team roster
- Christopher Reitz (gk)
- Jan-Peter Tewes
- Carsten Fischer
- Christian Blunck
- Björn Emmerling
- Patrick Bellenbaum
- Sven Meinhardt
- Christoph Bechmann
- Oliver Domke
- Andreas Becker
- Michael Green
- Klaus Michler
- Volker Fried
- Christian Mayerhöfer
- Stefan Saliger
- Michael Knauth (gk)

Head coach: Paul Lissek

Group play

Pos	Team	Pld	W	D	L	GF	GA	GD	Pts	Qualification
1	Spain	5	4	0	1	14	5	+9	8	Advanced to Semi-finals
2	Germany	5	3	1	1	10	3	+7	7	Advanced to Semi-finals
3	India	5	2	2	1	8	3	+5	6	
4	Pakistan	5	2	1	2	11	8	+3	5	
5	Argentina	5	2	0	3	9	13	−4	4	
6	United States (H)	5	0	0	5	3	23	−20	0	

Source: FIH
Rules for classification: 1) points; 2) goal difference; 3) games won; 4) head-to-head result.
(H) Hosts

20 July 1996
09:00

Spain	1–0	Germany
Arnau 50'	Report

Umpires:
Don Prior (AUS)
Craig Madden (GBR)

22 July 1996
17:30

Germany	1–1	India
Saliger 66'	Report	Mukesh 62'

Umpires:
Roger St Rose (TRI)
Floris Idenburg (NED)

24 July 1996
20:00

Germany	3–1	Pakistan
Becker 6', 49'; Meinhardt 39'	Report	Khalid 62'

Umpires:
Don Prior (AUS)
Patrick van Beneden (BEL)

26 July 1996
09:00

Germany	3–0	Argentina
Saliger 16'; Becker 19'; Bellenbaum 64'	Report

Umpires:
Floris Idenburg (NED)
Don Prior (AUS)

28 July 1996
17:30

United States	0–3	Germany
	Report	Fischer 11', 22'; Blunck 23'

Umpires:
Sasidharan Vasutheven (MAS)
Peter von Reth (NED)

Semifinal

31 July 1996
20:00

Germany	1–3	Netherlands
Meinhardt 60'	Report	Van den Honert 3', 45', 53'

Umpires:
Donald Prior (AUS)
Ray O'Connor (IRL)

Bronze medal match

2 August 1996
17:00

(bronze) Australia	3–2	Germany
Stacy 14', 63'; Choppy 69'	Report	Meinhardt 40'; Domke 46'

Umpires:
Eduardo Ruiz (ARG)
Peter von Reth (NED)

=== Women's tournament ===
Team roster
- (01.) Susie Wollschläger (gk)
- (02.) Birgit Beyer (gk)
- (03.) Vanessa van Kooperen
- (04.) Philippa Suxdorf
- (05.) Nadine Ernsting-Krienke
- (06.) Simone Thomaschinski
- (07.) Irina Kuhnt
- (08.) Melanie Cremer
- (09.) Franziska Hentschel
- (10.) Tanja Dickenscheid
- (11.) Eva Hagenbäumer
- (12.) Britta Becker
- (13.) Natascha Keller
- (14.) Tina Peters
- (15.) Heike Lätzsch
- (16.) Katrin Kauschke

Group play

Pos	Team	Pld	W	D	L	GF	GA	GD	Pts	Qualification
1	Australia	7	6	1	0	24	4	+20	13	Gold medal match
2	South Korea	7	4	2	1	18	9	+9	10	Gold medal match
3	Great Britain	7	3	2	2	12	11	+1	8	Bronze medal match
4	Netherlands	7	3	2	2	15	15	0	8	Bronze medal match
5	United States (H)	7	2	2	3	8	11	−3	6	
6	Germany	7	2	1	4	10	11	−1	5	
7	Argentina	7	2	1	4	7	21	−14	5	
8	Spain	7	0	1	6	5	17	−12	1	

Source: FIH
Rules for classification: 1) points; 2) goal difference; 3) goals scored; 4) head-to-head result.
(H) Hosts

20 July 1996
17:30

Argentina	0–2	Germany
	Report	van Kooperan 17'; Lätzsch 39'

Umpires:
Janice McDonald (GBR)
Angela Lario Ruiz (ESP)

21 July 1996
17:30

Spain	1–2	Germany
Tellería 31'	Report	Hentschel 15' van Kooperen 56'

Umpires:
Laura Crespo (ARG)
Gill Clarke (GBR)

23 July 1996
09:00

Australia	1–0	Germany
Roche 25'	Report

Umpires:
Lee Mi-ok (KOR)
Gina Spitaleri (ITA)

25 July 1996
11:00

Netherlands	4–3	Germany
Dubbeldam 3' de Ruiter 21'; Donners 52', 63'	Report	Becker 27', 43'; Cremer 55'

Umpires:
Laura Crespo (ARG)
Margaret Lanning (CAN)

26 July 1996
17:30

United States	1–1	Germany
Werley 54'	Report	Cremer 3'

Umpires:
Kazuko Yasueda (JPN)
Janice McDonald (GBR)

28 July 1996
09:00

Germany	2–3	Great Britain
Hentschel 29'; Becker 38'	Report	Atkins 51', 69'; Sixsmith 61'

Umpires:
Miriam van Gemert (NED)
Laura Crespo (ARG)

30 July 1996
11:00

Germany	0–1	South Korea
	Report	Chang Eun-jung 31'

Umpires:
Gina Spitaleri (ITA)
Naomi Kato (JPN)

== Football ==
=== Summary ===
Key:

- A.E.T – After extra time.
- P – Match decided by penalty-shootout.

Team	Event	Group stage				Semifinal	Final / BM	
Team	Event	Opposition Score	Opposition Score	Opposition Score	Rank	Opposition Score	Opposition Score	Rank
Germany women's	Women's tournament	Japan; W 3–2	Norway; L 2–3	Brazil; D 1–1	3	Did not advance		5

=== Women's tournament ===
Team roster

Head coach: Gero Bisanz

Germany named a squad of 16 players and 4 alternates for the tournament.

No.	Pos.	Player	Date of birth (age)	Caps	Goals	Club
1	GK	Manuela Goller	5 January 1971 (aged 25)	42		(German Football Association) Grün-Weiß Brauweiler
2	DF	Jutta Nardenbach	13 August 1968 (aged 27)	56		(German Football Association) TuS Ahrbach
3	DF	Birgitt Austermühl	8 October 1965 (aged 30)	55		(German Football Association) FSV Frankfurt
4	DF	Kerstin Stegemann	29 September 1977 (aged 18)	9		(German Football Association) FC Eintracht Rheine
5	DF	Doris Fitschen	25 October 1968 (aged 27)	81		(German Football Association) TSV Siegen
6	MF	Dagmar Pohlmann	7 February 1972 (aged 24)	36		(German Football Association) FSV Frankfurt
7	MF	Martina Voss	22 December 1967 (aged 28)	89		(German Football Association) FC Rumeln-Kaldenhausen
8	MF	Bettina Wiegmann	7 October 1971 (aged 24)	67		(German Football Association) Grün-Weiß Brauweiler
9	FW	Heidi Mohr	29 May 1967 (aged 29)	101		(German Football Association) TuS Niederkirchen
10	MF	Silvia Neid (captain)	2 May 1964 (aged 32)	108		(German Football Association) TSV Siegen
11	FW	Patricia Brocker	7 April 1966 (aged 30)	43		(German Football Association) TuS Niederkirchen
12	GK	Katja Kraus	23 November 1970 (aged 25)	6		(German Football Association) FSV Frankfurt
13	DF	Sandra Minnert	7 April 1973 (aged 23)	28		(German Football Association) FSV Frankfurt
14	MF	Pia Wunderlich	26 January 1975 (aged 21)	19		(German Football Association) SG Praunheim
15	FW	Birgit Prinz	25 October 1977 (aged 18)	25		(German Football Association) FSV Frankfurt
16	MF	Renate Lingor	11 October 1975 (aged 20)	5		(German Football Association) SC Klinge Seckach

Unenrolled alternate players
No.	Pos.	Player	Date of birth (age)	Caps	Goals	Club
17	DF	Tina Wunderlich	10 October 1977 (aged 18)	6		(German Football Association) SG Praunheim
18	FW	Katja Bornschein	16 March 1972 (aged 24)	31		(German Football Association) FSV Frankfurt
19	MF	Sandra Smisek	3 July 1977 (aged 19)	9		(German Football Association) FSV Frankfurt
20	GK	Christine Francke	12 June 1974 (aged 22)	2		

Group play

Pos	Team	Pld	W	D	L	GF	GA	GD	Pts	Qualification
1	Norway	3	2	1	0	9	4	+5	7	Semi-finals
2	Brazil	3	1	2	0	5	3	+2	5	Semi-finals
3	Germany	3	1	1	1	6	6	0	4	
4	Japan	3	0	0	3	2	9	−7	0	

Source: FIFA
Rules for classification: Tiebreakers
21 July 1996
13:30

Germany	3–2	Japan
Wiegmann 5'; Tomei 29' (o.g.); Mohr 52'	Report (FIFA)	Kioka 18'; Noda 33'

Legion Field, Birmingham, Alabama
Attendance: 44,211
Referee: Sonia Denoncourt (Canada)

23 July 1996
18:30

Norway	3–2	Germany
Aarønes 5'; Medalen 34'; Riise 65'	Report (FIFA)	Wiegmann 32'; Prinz 62'

Robert F. Kennedy Stadium, Washington, D.C.
Attendance: 28,000
Referee: Edward McGregor Lennie (Australia)

25 July 1996
18:30

Brazil	1–1	Germany
Sissi 53'	Report (FIFA)	Wunderlich 4'

Legion Field, Birmingham, Alabama
Attendance: 28,319
Referee: Sonia Denoncourt (Canada)

== Gymnastics ==
=== Artistic ===
==== Men ====
Team

Athlete	Event	Qualification							
Athlete	Event	Apparatus						Total	Rank
Athlete	Event	F	PH	R	V	PB	HB	Total	Rank
Valeri Belenki	Team	19.150	18.425	19.137	19.149	18.862	19.187	113.910	13 Q
Uwe Billerbeck	Team	18.662	—N/a		18.937	18.850	18.950	75.399	101
Jan-Peter Nikiferow	Team	19.112	18.837	18.850	18.912	18.375	19.112	113.198	24 Q
Karsten Oelsch	Team	9.275	17.225	18.662	18.587	17.550	19.162	100.461	75
Marius Tobă	Team	9.225	16.525	19.350 Q	—N/a			45.100	110
Oliver Walther	Team	18.675	18.750	19.025	18.700	18.450	18.962	112.562	32
Andreas Wecker	Team	18.975	18.650	19.350 Q	19.162	18.950	19.387 Q	114.474	9 Q
Total	Team	94.649	92.437	95.712	94.935	93.862	95.810	567.405	7

Individual finals

Athlete	Event	Apparatus						Total	Rank
Athlete	Event	F	PH	R	V	PB	HB	Total	Rank
Valeri Belenki	All-around	9.612	9.762	9.612	9.600	9.625	9.637	57.848	6
Jan-Peter Nikiferow	All-around	9.587	9.450	9.575	9.400	9.437	9.375	56.824	23
Marius Tobă	Rings	—N/a		9.737	—N/a			9.737	7
Andreas Wecker	All-around	9.600	9.025	9.750	9.662	9.600	9.775	57.412	13
Andreas Wecker	Rings	—N/a		9.762	—N/a			9.762	5
Andreas Wecker	Horizontal bar	—N/a					9.850	9.850	1st place, gold medalist(s)

==== Women ====
Athlete	Event	Qualification					
Athlete	Event	Apparatus				Total	Rank
Athlete	Event	V	UB	BB	F	Total	Rank
Yvonne Pioch	Individual	17.925	18.187	16.475	17.100	69.687	72
Kathleen Stark	Individual	18.900	18.525	17.487	18.625	73.537	55

=== Rhythmic ===
Group all-around

Athlete	Event	Qualification				Final			
Athlete	Event	Hoop	Ball + Ribbon	Total	Rank	Hoop	Ball + Ribbon	Total	Rank
Nicole Bittner; Katrin Hoffmann; Anne Jung; Dörte Schiltz; Luise Stäblein; Katharina Wildermuth	Group all-around	19.050	18.832	37.882	8	Did not advance			

Individual all-around

Athlete	Event	Qualification						Semifinal						Final					
Athlete	Event	Hoop	Ball	Clubs	Ribbon	Total	Rank	Hoop	Ball	Clubs	Ribbon	Total	Rank	Hoop	Ball	Clubs	Ribbon	Total	Rank
Magdalena Brzeska	Individual	9.566	8.933	9.533	9.583	37.615	15 Q	9.550	9.583	9.516	9.583	38.232	10 Q	9.516	9.600	9.566	9.633	38.315	10
Kristin Sroka	Individual	9.432	9.450	9.399	9.416	37.697	14 Q	9.283	9.550	8.900	9.400	37.133	16	Did not advance					

== Handball ==
=== Summary ===
Key:

- A.E.T – After extra time.
- P – Match decided by penalty-shootout.

Team	Event	Group stage						Semifinal	Final / BM	
Team	Event	Opposition Score	Opposition Score	Opposition Score	Opposition Score	Opposition Score	Rank	Opposition Score	Opposition Score	Rank
Germany men's	Men's tournament	Brazil; W 30–20	Spain; L 20–22	Egypt; L 22–24	Algeria; W 25–23	France; W 24–23	4	—N/a	7th Place Match; Switzerland; W 23–16	7
Germany women's	Women's tournament	South Korea; L 20–33	Norway; L 23–28	Angola; W 27–12	—N/a		3	—N/a	5th Place Match; China; L 26–28	6

=== Men's tournament ===
Team roster

- Markus Baur
- Jan Fegter
- Henning Fritz
- Jan Holpert
- Holger Löhr
- Thomas Knorr
- Karsten Kohlhaas
- Stephan Kretschmar
- Klaus-Dieter Petersen
- Christian Scheffler
- Martin Schmidt
- Martin Schwalb
- Christian Schwarzer
- Daniel Stephan
- Andreas Thiel
- Volker Zerbe

Group play

Pos	Team	Pld	W	D	L	GF	GA	GD	Pts	Qualification
1	France	5	4	0	1	145	114	+31	8 (Note: France 27–25 Spain)	Semifinals
2	Spain	5	4	0	1	114	97	+17	8	Semifinals
3	Egypt	5	3	0	2	113	103	+10	6 (Note: Germany 22–24 Egypt)	Fifth place game
4	Germany	5	3	0	2	121	112	+9	6	Seventh place game
5	Algeria	5	0	1	4	95	117	−22	1 (Note: Algeria 20–20 Brazil)	Ninth place game
6	Brazil	5	0	1	4	100	145	−45	1	Eleventh place game

Rules for classification: 1) points; 2) head-to-head points; 3) head-to-head goal difference; 4) head-to-head number of goals scored; 5) goal difference.
Notes:

24 July 1996; 20:45	Germany	30–20	Brazil	Georgia World Congress Center; Referees: Bojsen, Boehne (USA)
24 July 1996; 20:45	Löhr 7	(12–7)	Barros 4	Georgia World Congress Center; Referees: Bojsen, Boehne (USA)

25 July 1996; 16:15	Spain	22–20	Germany	Georgia World Congress Center; Referees: Brussel, van Dongen (NED)
25 July 1996; 16:15	Garralda, Urdiales 5	(11–10)	Zerbe 6	Georgia World Congress Center; Referees: Brussel, van Dongen (NED)

27 July 1996; 16:15	Germany	22–24	Egypt	Georgia World Congress Center; Referees: Dăncescu, Mateescu (ROU)
27 July 1996; 16:15	Schwalb 6	(9–11)	El-Attar 5	Georgia World Congress Center; Referees: Dăncescu, Mateescu (ROU)

29 July 1996; 14:30	Germany	25–23	Algeria	Georgia World Congress Center; Referees: Vujnović, Mladinić (CRO)
29 July 1996; 14:30	Kretzschmar 5	(13–12)	Saidi 6	Georgia World Congress Center; Referees: Vujnović, Mladinić (CRO)

31 July 1996; 16:15	France	23–24	Germany	Georgia World Congress Center; Referees: Brussel, van Dongen (NED)
31 July 1996; 16:15	Prandi, Stoecklin 6	(10–12)	Fegter 7	Georgia World Congress Center; Referees: Brussel, van Dongen (NED)

7th place match

2 August 1996; 14:30	Switzerland	16–23	Germany	Georgia World Congress Center; Referees: Elbrønd, Løvqvist (DEN)
2 August 1996; 14:30	Scharer 6	(10–12)	Scheffler, Stephan 5	Georgia World Congress Center; Referees: Elbrønd, Løvqvist (DEN)

=== Women's tournament ===
Team roster

- Kathrin Blacha
- Andrea Bölk
- Eike Bram
- Csilla Elekes
- Michaela Erler
- Franziska Heinz
- Grit Jurack
- Eva Kiss-Györi
- Christine Lindemann
- Emilia Luca
- Heike Murrweiss
- Miroslava Ritskiavitchius
- Michaela Schanze
- Melanie Schliecker
- Bianca Urbanke
- Marlies Waelzer

Group play

Pos	Team	Pld	W	D	L	GF	GA	GD	Pts	Qualification
1	South Korea	3	3	0	0	83	60	+23	6	Semifinals
2	Norway	3	2	0	1	79	66	+13	4	Semifinals
3	Germany	3	1	0	2	70	73	−3	2	Fifth place game
4	Angola	3	0	0	3	49	82	−33	0	Seventh place game

Rules for classification: 1) points; 2) head-to-head points; 3) head-to-head goal difference; 4) head-to-head number of goals scored; 5) goal difference.

26 July 1996; 16:30	South Korea	33–20	Germany	Georgia World Congress Center; Referees: Elbrønd, Løvqvist (DEN)
26 July 1996; 16:30	Lim 7	(17–12)	Erler, Luca 4	Georgia World Congress Center; Referees: Elbrønd, Løvqvist (DEN)

28 July 1996; 16:30	Germany	23–28	Norway	Georgia World Congress Center; Referees: Garcia, Moréno (FRA)
28 July 1996; 16:30	Ritskiavitchius 8	(11–15)	Grini 10	Georgia World Congress Center; Referees: Garcia, Moréno (FRA)

30 July 1996; 12:00	Germany	27–12	Angola	Georgia World Congress Center; Referees: Al-Houli, Al-Enezi (KUW)
30 July 1996; 12:00	Jurack, Waelzer 5	(10–6)	Webba 5	Georgia World Congress Center; Referees: Al-Houli, Al-Enezi (KUW)

5th place match

1 August 1996; 14:30	Germany	26–28	China	Georgia World Congress Center; Referees: Vujnović, Mladinić (CRO)
1 August 1996; 14:30	Heinz 7	(12–16)	Shi 12	Georgia World Congress Center; Referees: Vujnović, Mladinić (CRO)

== Judo ==
Men

Athlete	Event	Round of 64	Round of 32	Round of 16	Quarterfinals	Semifinals	Repechage			Final	
Athlete	Event	Round of 64	Round of 32	Round of 16	Quarterfinals	Semifinals	Round 1	Round 2	Round 3	Final	
Athlete	Event	Opposition Result	Opposition Result	Opposition Result	Opposition Result	Opposition Result	Opposition Result	Opposition Result	Opposition Result	Opposition Result	Rank
Richard Trautmann	–60 kg	Bye	Sunada (USA); W Ippon	Bagirov (BLR); W Shido	Kim (KOR); W Ippon	Giovinazzo (ITA); L Ippon	Bye			Ozhegin (RUS); W Ippon	3rd place, bronze medalist(s)
Udo Quellmalz	–65 kg	Bye	Figuereo (DOM); W Ippon	Hernández (CUB); W Ippon	Almeida (POR); W Ippon	Laats (BEL); W Ippon	Bye			Nakamura (JPN); W Yusei-gachi	1st place, gold medalist(s)
Martin Schmidt	–71 kg	Bye	Wojdan (POL); W Ippon	Hajtós (HUN); W Ippon	Nakamura (JPN); L Ippon	Did not advance	Bye	Schleicher (AUT); W Waza-ari	Pedro (USA); L Ippon	Did not advance	
Stefan Dott	–78 kg	Bye	Dixon (NCA); W Ippon	Laats (BEL); W Ippon	Uznadze (TUR); W Ippon	Bouras (FRA); L Keikoku	Bye			Liparteliani (GEO); L Ippon	5
Marko Spittka	–86 kg	Bye	Alimzhanov (KAZ); W Ippon	Zanol (BRA); W Keikoku	Gill (CAN); W Ippon	Jeon (KOR); L Ippon	Bye			Yoshida (JPN); W Yusei-gachi	3rd place, bronze medalist(s)
Detlef Knorrek	–95 kg	Bye	Soares (POR); L Ippon	Did not advance							
Frank Möller	+95 kg	Bye	Ebbers (NED); W Ippon	Pérez (ESP); L Yusei-gachi	Did not advance		Tataroğlu (TUR); W Ippon	Csősz (HUN); W Ippon	Kosorotov (RUS); W Ippon	Ogawa (JPN); W Ippon	3rd place, bronze medalist(s)

Women

Athlete	Event	Round of 32	Round of 16	Quarterfinals	Semifinals	Repechage			Final	
Athlete	Event	Round of 32	Round of 16	Quarterfinals	Semifinals	Round 1	Round 2	Round 3	Final	
Athlete	Event	Opposition Result	Opposition Result	Opposition Result	Opposition Result	Opposition Result	Opposition Result	Opposition Result	Opposition Result	Rank
Jana Perlberg	–48 kg	Bye	Roszkowska (POL); L Koka	Did not advance						
Alexa von Schwichow	–52 kg	Bye	Verdecia (CUB); L Ippon	Did not advance		—N/a	Sugawara (JPN); L Chui	Did not advance		
Susann Singer	–61 kg	Jung (KOR); L Yuko	Did not advance			Pace (MLT); W Ippon	Kobaş (TUR); L Ippon	Did not advance		
Anja von Rekowski	–66 kg	Pierantozzi (ITA); W Ippon	Sweatman (GBR); L Koka	Did not advance						
Hannah Ertel	–72 kg	Bacher (USA); W Ippon	Tanabe (JPN); L Ippon	Did not advance		—N/a	Howey (GBR); W Shido	Luna (CUB); L Ippon	Did not advance	
Johanna Hagn	+72 kg	Seriese (NED); W Ippon	Burgatta (ITA); W Yusei-gachi	Sun (CHN); L Yuko	Did not advance	—N/a	Rogers (GBR); W Shido	da Silva (BRA); W Yuko	Maksymow (POL); W Yuko	3rd place, bronze medalist(s)

== Rowing ==
Men

Athlete	Event	Heats		Repechage		Semifinals		Final	
Athlete	Event	Time	Rank	Time	Rank	Time	Rank	Time	Rank
Thomas Lange	Single sculls	7:34.52	1 SF	Bye		7:12.30	1 FA	6:47.72	3rd place, bronze medalist(s)
Sebastian Mayer; Roland Opfer	Double sculls	6:51.41	2 R	6:47.52	1 SF	6:42.57	3 FA	6:29.32	6
Peter Uhrig; Ingo Euler	Lightweight double sculls	6:54.82	2 R	6:18.11	2 SF	6:40.14	6 FB	6:30.43	11
André Steiner; Andreas Hajek; Stephan Volkert; André Willms	Quadruple sculls	6:06.33	1 SF	Bye		5:55.10	1 FA	5:56.93	1st place, gold medalist(s)
Matthias Ungemach; Colin von Ettingshausen	Coxless pair	6:57.78	4 R	7:11.67	5 FC	—N/a		7:06.88	15
Stefan Forster; Ike Landvoigt; Claas Peter Fischer; Stefan Scholz	Coxless four	6:21.98	4 R	6:29.10	1 SF	6:19.06	6 FB	5:57.77	9
Tobias Rose; Martin Weis; Michael Buchheit; Bernhard Stomporowski	Lightweight coxless four	6:22.97	2 R	5:58.90	1 SF	6:12.73	3 FA	6:14.79	5
Frank Richter; Mark Kleinschmidt; Wolfram Huhn; Marc Weber; Detlef Kirchhoff; Thorsten Streppelhoff; Ulrich Viefers; Roland Baar; Peter Thiede	Eight	5:46.04	2 R	5:30.61	1 FA	—N/a		5:44.58	2nd place, silver medalist(s)

Women

Athlete	Event	Heats		Repechage		Semifinals		Final	
Athlete	Event	Time	Rank	Time	Rank	Time	Rank	Time	Rank
Meike Evers	Single sculls	8:24.14	5 R	8:54.05	3 FC	—N/a		8:16.51	13
Jana Thieme; Manuela Lutze	Double sculls	7:21.13	2 SF	Bye		7:19.62	3 FA	7:04.14	5
Michelle Darvill; Ruth Kaps	Lightweight double sculls	7:45.52	2 R	7:05.29	2 SF	7:19.69	4 FB	7:04.31	8
Jana Sorgers; Katrin Rutschow; Kathrin Boron; Kerstin Köppen	Quadruple sculls	6:36.00	1 FA	Bye		—N/a		6:27.44	1st place, gold medalist(s)
Kathrin Haacker; Stefani Werremeier	Coxless pair	7:28.65	2 SF	Bye		7:34.80	3 FA	7:08.49	4
Ina Justh; Antje Rehaag; Kathleen Naser; Andrea Gesch; Dana Pyritz; Micaela Schmidt; Anja Pyritz; Ute Schell; Daniela Neunast	Eight	6:33.90	3 R	6:09.43	5 FB	—N/a		6:17.73	8

== Sailing ==
Men

Athlete	Event	Race											Net points	Final rank
Athlete	Event	1	2	3	4	5	6	7	8	9	10	11	Net points	Final rank
Matthias Bornhäuser	Mistral One Design	3	11	13	~~27~~	~~47~~	15	7	8	3	—N/a		60	10
Michael Fellmann	Finn	15	12	11	17	15	~~26~~	~~26~~	15	14	22	—N/a	121	20
Ronald Rensch; Torsten Haverland	470	~~37~~	8	2	10	22	9	22	11	14	~~29~~	6	104	12

Women

Athlete	Event	Race											Net points	Final rank
Athlete	Event	1	2	3	4	5	6	7	8	9	10	11	Net points	Final rank
Sibylle Powarzynski	Europe	18	3	4	7	10	10	~~25~~	18	~~21~~	4	1	75	6
Susanne Bauckholt; Katrin Adlkofer	470	~~16~~	6	5	5	3	4	6	7	11	2	~~12~~	49	5

Open
Fleet racing

Athlete	Event	Race											Net points	Final rank
Athlete	Event	1	2	3	4	5	6	7	8	9	10	11	Net points	Final rank
Stefan Warkalla	Laser	13	2	2	3	12	4	~~15~~	6	5	7	~~57~~	54	5
Roland Gäbler; Frank Parlow	Tornado	~~15~~	8	11	1	~~12~~	9	9	2	2	1	5	48	7
Frank Butzmann; Kai Falkenthal	Star	8	13	4	4	~~17~~	12	8	~~15~~	2	15	—N/a	66	10

Match racing

Athlete	Event	Qualification races										Total	Rank	Quarterfinals	Semifinals	Final / BM	Rank
Athlete	Event	1	2	3	4	5	6	7	8	9	10	Total	Rank	Quarterfinals	Semifinals	Final / BM	Rank
Jochen Schümann; Thomas Flach; Bernd Jäkel	Soling	5	5	2	4	1	~~9~~	~~9~~	6	2	9	34	1 Q	Bye	Great Britain; W 3–0	Russia; W 3–0	1st place, gold medalist(s)

== Shooting ==
Men

Athlete	Event	Qualification		Final	
Athlete	Event	Points	Rank	Points	Rank
Karsten Bindrich	Trap	121	9	Did not advance	
Karsten Bindrich	Double trap	133	15	Did not advance	
Jörg Damme	Trap	119	20	Did not advance	
Maik Eckhardt	10 metre air rifle	591	9	Did not advance	
Maik Eckhardt	50 metre rifle three positions	1165	10	Did not advance	
Artur Gevorgjan	10 metre air pistol	580	9	Did not advance	
Artur Gevorgjan	50 metre pistol	548	37	Did not advance	
Jan-Henrik Heinrich	Skeet	118	26	Did not advance	
Bernhard Hochwald	Skeet	119	20	Did not advance	
Michael Jakosits	10 metre running target	568	11	Did not advance	
Christian Klees	50 metre rifle three positions	1155	37	Did not advance	
Christian Klees	50 metre rifle three prone	600	1 Q	704.8	1st place, gold medalist(s)
Daniel Leonhard	25 metre rapid fire pistol	586	6 Q	683.6	8
Uwe Möller	Trap	114	49	Did not advance	
Hans-Jürgen Neumaier	10 metre air pistol	580	9	Did not advance	
Hans-Jürgen Neumaier	50 metre pistol	549	35	Did not advance	
Johann Riederer	10 metre air rifle	588	18	Did not advance	
Bernd Rücker	50 metre rifle three prone	595	11	Did not advance	
Waldemar Schanz	Double trap	128	22	Did not advance	
Ralf Schumann	25 metre rapid fire pistol	596	1 Q	698.0	1st place, gold medalist(s)
Axel Wegner	Skeet	118	26	Did not advance	
Jens Zimmermann	10 metre running target	574	7 Q	672.2	7

Women

Athlete	Event	Qualification		Final	
Athlete	Event	Points	Rank	Points	Rank
Petra Horneber	10 metre air rifle	397	1 Q	497.4	2nd place, silver medalist(s)
Petra Horneber	50 metre rifle three positions	579	9	Did not advance	
Susanne Kiermayer	Double trap	105	3 Q	139	2nd place, silver medalist(s)
Bettina Knells	10 metre air rifle	386	36	Did not advance	
Kirsten Obel	50 metre rifle three positions	584	4 Q	679.2	4
Anke Völker	10 metre air pistol	375	27	Did not advance	
Anke Völker	25 metre pistol	573	23	Did not advance	

== Swimming ==
Men

Athlete	Event	Heats		Final A/B	
Athlete	Event	Time	Rank	Time	Rank
Ralf Braun	100 metre backstroke	55.73	6 FA	55.56	7
Ralf Braun	200 metre backstroke	2:01.50	12 FB	Withdrew	
Chris-Carol Bremer	200 metre butterfly	2:00.48	14 FB	2:01.62	16
Aimo Heilmann	200 metre freestyle	1:49.57	10 FB	1:48.81	9
Jörg Hoffmann	400 metre freestyle	3:51.26	3 FA	3:52.15	7
Jörg Hoffmann	1500 metre freestyle	15:18.61	5 FA	15:18.86	7
Christian Keller	200 metre individual medley	2:03.82	12 FB	2:02.90	9
Oliver Lampe	100 metre butterfly	54.56	21	Did not advance	
Oliver Lampe	200 metre butterfly	1:59.87	9 FB	2:00.08	12
Alexander Lüderitz	50 metre freestyle	23.06	21	Did not advance	
Stev Theloke	100 metre backstroke	56.26	13 FB	56.63	14
Stev Theloke	200 metre individual medley	2:04.23	13 FB	2:03.94	12
Christian Tröger	100 metre freestyle	50.06	9 FB	49.90	10
Mark Warnecke	100 metre breaststroke	1:01.79	3 FA	1:01.33	3rd place, bronze medalist(s)
Sebastian Wiese	400 metre freestyle	3:53.55	9 FB	3:52.37	10
Steffen Zesner	1500 metre freestyle	15:21.65	9	Did not advance	
Bengt Zikarsky	50 metre freestyle	22.68	9 FB	22.73	10
Björn Zikarsky	100 metre freestyle	50.38	15 FB	49.91	11
Christian Tröger; Bengt Zikarsky; Björn Zikarsky; Mark Pinger; Alexander Lüderitz (*)	4 × 100 metre freestyle relay	3:19.27	2 FA	3:17.20	3rd place, bronze medalist(s)
Aimo Heilmann; Christian Keller; Christian Tröger; Steffen Zesner; Konstantin Dubrovin (*); Oliver Lampe (*)	4 × 200 metre freestyle relay	7:22.17	4 FA	7:17.71	3rd place, bronze medalist(s)
Ralf Braun; Mark Warnecke; Christian Keller; Björn Zikarsky; Stev Theloke (*); Oliver Lampe (*); Bengt Zikarsky (*)	4 × 100 metre medley relay	3:41.10	3 FA	3:39.64	4

Women

Athlete	Event	Heats		Final A/B	
Athlete	Event	Time	Rank	Time	Rank
Antje Buschschulte	100 metre backstroke	1:02.68	7 FA	1:02.52	6
Kathrin Dumitru	100 metre breaststroke	1:11.92	26	Did not advance	
Kathrin Dumitru	200 metre breaststroke	2:37.07	31	Did not advance	
Dagmar Hase	200 metre freestyle	2:00.38	4 FA	1:59.56	3rd place, bronze medalist(s)
Dagmar Hase	400 metre freestyle	4:11.17	4 FA	4:08.30	2nd place, silver medalist(s)
Dagmar Hase	800 metre freestyle	8:33.55	2 FA	8:29.91	2nd place, silver medalist(s)
Sabine Herbst	200 metre butterfly	2:16.66	19	Did not advance	
Sabine Herbst	200 metre individual medley	2:18.00	15 FB	2:16.68	11
Sabine Herbst	400 metre individual medley	4:45.36	7 FA	4:43.78	4
Kerstin Kielgaß	400 metre freestyle	4:08.99	1 FA	4:09.83	4
Kerstin Kielgaß	800 metre freestyle	8:36.33	3 FA	8:31.06	4
Simone Osygus	50 metre freestyle	26.00	13 FB	26.16	14
Cathleen Rund	200 metre backstroke	2:13.58	6 FA	2:12.06	3rd place, bronze medalist(s)
Cathleen Rund	400 metre individual medley	4:55.30	21	Did not advance	
Anke Scholz	100 metre backstroke	1:03.05	10 FB	1:02.85	10
Anke Scholz	200 metre backstroke	2:12.73	3 FA	2:12.90	4
Franziska van Almsick	100 metre freestyle	55.80	4 FA	55.59	5
Franziska van Almsick	200 metre freestyle	1:59.40	1 FA	1:58.57	2nd place, silver medalist(s)
Sandra Völker	50 metre freestyle	25.45	3 FA	25.14	3rd place, bronze medalist(s)
Sandra Völker	100 metre freestyle	55.55	3 FA	54.88	2nd place, silver medalist(s)
Julia Voitovitsch	100 metre butterfly	1:01.47	14 FB	1:01.14	12
Sandra Völker; Simone Osygus; Antje Buschschulte; Franziska van Almsick; Meike Freitag (*)	4 × 100 metre freestyle relay	3:44.17	4 FA	3:41.48	3rd place, bronze medalist(s)
Franziska van Almsick; Kerstin Kielgaß; Anke Scholz; Dagmar Hase; Simone Osygus (*); Meike Freitag (*)	4 × 200 metre freestyle relay	8:08.58	2 FA	8:01.55	2nd place, silver medalist(s)
Antje Buschschulte; Kathrin Dumitru; Franziska van Almsick; Sandra Völker	4 × 100 metre medley relay	4:08.95	3 FA	4:09.22	6

== Table tennis ==
Men

Athlete	Event	Group Stage				Round of 16	Quarterfinal	Semifinal	Final	
Athlete	Event	Opposition Result	Opposition Result	Opposition Result	Rank	Opposition Result	Opposition Result	Opposition Result	Opposition Result	Rank
Peter Franz	Singles	Florea (ROU); L 0–2	Al-Habashi (KUW); W 2–0	Saive (BEL); L 0–2	3	Did not advance				
Jörg Roßkopf	Singles	Muñoz (MEX); W 2–0	Lo (HKG); W 2–0	Shibutani (JPN); W 2–0	1 Q	Chila (FRA); W 3–0	Kim (KOR); W 3–2	Liu (CHN); L 1–3	Korbel (CZE); W 3–1	3rd place, bronze medalist(s)
Jörg Roßkopf; Steffen Fetzner	Doubles	Peixoto / Hoyama (BRA); W 2–0	Ng / Huang (CAN); W 2–0	Schlager / Jindrak (AUT); W 2–0	1 Q	—N/a	Éloi / Gatien (FRA); W 3–0	Lu / Wang (CHN); L 0–3	Lee / Yoo (KOR); L 0–3	4

Women

Athlete	Event	Group Stage				Round of 16	Quarterfinal	Semifinal	Final	
Athlete	Event	Opposition Result	Opposition Result	Opposition Result	Rank	Opposition Result	Opposition Result	Opposition Result	Opposition Result	Rank
Olga Nemes	Singles	Chen (TPE); W 2–0	Steshenko (TKM); W 2–0	Park (KOR); L 0–2	2	Did not advance				
Jie Schöpp	Singles	Timina (RUS); W 2–0	Oshonaike (NGR); W 2–0	Kim (PRK); L 0–2	2	Did not advance				
Nicole Struse	Singles	Touati (TUN); W 2–0	Boroš (CRO); W 2–0	Todo (JPN); W 2–1	1 Q	Tu (SUI); W 3–1	Deng (CHN); L 0–3	Did not advance		
Elke Schall; Nicole Struse	Doubles	Keen / Hooman-Kloppenburg (NED); W 2–1	Arisi / Negrisoli (ITA); W 2–0	Koyama / Todo (JPN); L 1–2	2	Did not advance				
Jie Schöpp; Olga Nemes	Doubles	Lomas / Holt (GBR); W 2–0	Tepes / Rodríguez (CHI); W 2–0	Liu / Qiao (CHN); L 1–2	2	Did not advance				

== Tennis ==
Men

Athlete	Event	Round of 64	Round of 32	Round of 16	Quarterfinals	Semifinals	Final	
Athlete	Event	Opposition Result	Opposition Result	Opposition Result	Opposition Result	Opposition Result	Opposition Result	Rank
Marc-Kevin Goellner	Singles	Enqvist (SWE); L 6–7, 6–4, 4–6	Did not advance					
David Prinosil	Singles	Vacek (CZE); L 4–6, 6–2, 4–6	Did not advance					
Marc-Kevin Goellner; David Prinosil	Doubles	—N/a	Gaudenzi / Nargiso (ITA); W 4–6, 6–1, 7–5	Black / Black (ZIM); W 6–4, 7–6	Hiršzon / Ivanišević (CRO); W 6–2, 6–3	Broad / Henman (GBR); L 6–4, 3–6, 8–10	Eltingh / Haarhuis (NED); W 6–2, 7–5	3rd place, bronze medalist(s)

Women

Athlete	Event	Round of 64	Round of 32	Round of 16	Quarterfinals	Semifinals	Final	
Athlete	Event	Opposition Result	Opposition Result	Opposition Result	Opposition Result	Opposition Result	Opposition Result	Rank
Anke Huber	Singles	Cristea (ROU); W 2–6, 6–4, 6–2	de Swardt (RSA); W 3–6, 6–1, 6–4	Davenport (USA); L 1–6, 6–3, 3–6	Did not advance			

== Volleyball ==
=== Summary ===
Team	Event	Group stage						Quarterfinal	Semifinal	Final / BM	
Team	Event	Opposition Score	Opposition Score	Opposition Score	Opposition Score	Opposition Score	Rank	Opposition Score	Opposition Score	Opposition Score	Rank
Germany women's	Women's tournament	Russia; L 0–3	Peru; W 3–0	Canada; W 3–0	Cuba; L 0–3	Brazil; L 1–3	4 Q	China; L 0–3	Classification 5-8; Netherlands; L 2–3	7th Place Match; United States; L 1–3	8

=== Women's tournament ===
Team roster
- Nancy Celis
- Tanja Hart
- Karin Horninger
- Silvia Roll
- Susanne Lahme
- Grit Naumann
- Hanka Pachale
- Ines Pianka
- Constanze Radfan
- Christine Schultz
- Ute Steppin
- Claudia Wilke

- Head coach: Sigfried Kohler

Group stage

Pos	Team	Pld	W	L	Pts	SW	SL	SR	SPW	SPL	SPR	Qualification
1	Brazil	5	5	0	10	15	1	15.000	238	121	1.967	Quarterfinals
2	Russia	5	4	1	9	12	4	3.000	217	140	1.550	Quarterfinals
3	Cuba	5	3	2	8	10	6	1.667	196	156	1.256	Quarterfinals
4	Germany	5	2	3	7	7	9	0.778	163	191	0.853	Quarterfinals
5	Canada	5	1	4	6	3	14	0.214	156	239	0.653	
6	Peru	5	0	5	5	2	15	0.133	129	252	0.512	

Date		Score		Set 1	Set 2	Set 3	Set 4	Set 5	Total	Report
20 Jul	Russia	3–0	Germany	15–5	15–10	15–7			45–22	Report
22 Jul	Germany	3–0	Peru	15–11	15–6	15–3			45–20	Report
24 Jul	Canada	0–3	Germany	5–15	12–15	6–15			23–45	Report
26 Jul	Germany	0–3	Cuba	6–15	8–15	4–15			18–45	Report
28 Jul	Brazil	3–1	Germany	15–4	13–15	15–6	15–8		58–33	Report

Quarterfinal

Date		Score		Set 1	Set 2	Set 3	Set 4	Set 5	Total	Report
30 Jul	China	3–0	Germany	15–12	15–8	15–8			45–28	Report

Classification 5-8

Date		Score		Set 1	Set 2	Set 3	Set 4	Set 5	Total	Report
31 Jul	Germany	2–3	Netherlands	12–15	15–9	15–13	9–15	10–15	61–67	Report

7th place match

Date		Score		Set 1	Set 2	Set 3	Set 4	Set 5	Total	Report
1 Aug	Germany	1–3	United States	16–17	6–15	15–5	6–15		43–52	Report

== Water polo ==
Summary

Key:

- FT – After full time.

Team	Event	Group stage						Classification round			
Team	Event	Opposition Score	Opposition Score	Opposition Score	Opposition Score	Opposition Score	Rank	Opposition Score	Opposition Score	Opposition Score	Rank
Germany men's	Men's tournament	Spain; L 3–9	Hungary; L 8–9	Russia; L 8–10	FR Yugoslavia; L 8–9	Netherlands; W 9–8	5	Ukraine; W 10–4	Netherlands; W 9–6	Romania; W 10–6	9

=== Men's tournament ===
Team roster

- Ingo Borgmann
- Piotr Bukowski
- Oliver Dahler
- Jörg Dresel
- Torsten Dresel
- Davor Erjavec
- Michael Ilgner
- Dirk Klingenberg
- Raul de la Peña
- René Reimann
- Uwe Sterzik
- Lars Tomanek
- Daniel Voß

Group play

Pos	Team	Pld	W	D	L	GF	GA	GD	Pts
1	Hungary	5	5	0	0	47	38	+9	10
2	FR Yugoslavia	5	3	1	1	46	44	+2	7
3	Spain	5	3	0	2	39	33	+6	6
4	Russia	5	2	1	2	42	38	+4	5
5	Germany	5	1	0	4	36	45	−9	2
6	Netherlands	5	0	0	5	36	48	−12	0

20 July 1996; 16:40	Spain	9–3	Germany	Georgia Tech Aquatic Center; Referees: Daniel Légaré (CAN), Bret Bernard (USA)
20 July 1996; 16:40	Score by quarters: 3–0, 1–2, 2–1, 3–0			Georgia Tech Aquatic Center; Referees: Daniel Légaré (CAN), Bret Bernard (USA)
20 July 1996; 16:40	Gómez, Oca 2	Goals	three players 1	Georgia Tech Aquatic Center; Referees: Daniel Légaré (CAN), Bret Bernard (USA)

21 July 1996; 12:40	Hungary	9–8	Germany	Georgia Tech Aquatic Center; Referees: Željko Klarić (CRO), Jean-Claude Demey (FRA)
21 July 1996; 12:40	Score by quarters: 3–1, 3–3, 1–3, 2–1			Georgia Tech Aquatic Center; Referees: Željko Klarić (CRO), Jean-Claude Demey (FRA)
21 July 1996; 12:40	Kásás 3	Goals	Erjavec 3	Georgia Tech Aquatic Center; Referees: Željko Klarić (CRO), Jean-Claude Demey (FRA)

22 July 1996; 11:00	Russia	10–8	Germany	Georgia Tech Aquatic Center; Referees: François Simons (BEL), Salvatore Merola (ITA)
22 July 1996; 11:00	Score by quarters: 3–2, 3–3, 2–1, 2–2			Georgia Tech Aquatic Center; Referees: François Simons (BEL), Salvatore Merola (ITA)
22 July 1996; 11:00	Garbuzov 4	Goals	four players 2	Georgia Tech Aquatic Center; Referees: François Simons (BEL), Salvatore Merola (ITA)

23 July 1996; 11:00	FR Yugoslavia	9–8	Germany	Georgia Tech Aquatic Center; Referees: Bret Bernard (USA), Vladimir Prikhodko (KAZ)
23 July 1996; 11:00	Score by quarters: 2–1, 1–3, 5–2, 1–2			Georgia Tech Aquatic Center; Referees: Bret Bernard (USA), Vladimir Prikhodko (KAZ)
23 July 1996; 11:00	Vičević 3	Goals	Reimann, Dresel 2	Georgia Tech Aquatic Center; Referees: Bret Bernard (USA), Vladimir Prikhodko (KAZ)

24 July 1996; 16:40	Germany	9–8	Netherlands	Georgia Tech Aquatic Center; Referees: Jean-Claude Demey (FRA), Salah Hamici (ALG)
24 July 1996; 16:40	Score by quarters: 2–2, 4–0, 2–5, 1–1			Georgia Tech Aquatic Center; Referees: Jean-Claude Demey (FRA), Salah Hamici (ALG)
24 July 1996; 16:40	Erjavec 3	Goals	Havenga 4	Georgia Tech Aquatic Center; Referees: Jean-Claude Demey (FRA), Salah Hamici (ALG)

Classification round

	Team	Points	G	W	D	L	GF	GA	Diff
9.	Germany	6	3	3	0	0	29	16	+13
10.	Netherlands	3	3	1	1	1	25	26	–1
11.	Romania	2	3	1	0	2	25	28	–3
12.	Ukraine	1	3	0	1	2	21	30	–9

26 July 1996; 11:00	Germany	10–4	Ukraine	Georgia Tech Aquatic Center; Referees: Željko Klarić (CRO), Miroslav Radenović (YUG)
26 July 1996; 11:00	Score by quarters: 3–0, 3–1, 1–1, 3–2			Georgia Tech Aquatic Center; Referees: Željko Klarić (CRO), Miroslav Radenović (YUG)
26 July 1996; 11:00	Erjavec, Klingenberg 2	Goals	Stratan 2	Georgia Tech Aquatic Center; Referees: Željko Klarić (CRO), Miroslav Radenović (YUG)

27 July 1996; 11:00	Germany	9–6	Netherlands	Georgia Tech Aquatic Center; Referees: Joaquin Fernández (ESP), Bret Bernard (USA)
27 July 1996; 11:00	Score by quarters: 1–0, 2–3, 3–1, 3–2			Georgia Tech Aquatic Center; Referees: Joaquin Fernández (ESP), Bret Bernard (USA)
27 July 1996; 11:00	Klingenberg 3	Goals	van der Meer, van der Kolk 2	Georgia Tech Aquatic Center; Referees: Joaquin Fernández (ESP), Bret Bernard (USA)

28 July 1996; 9:30	Germany	10–6	Romania	Georgia Tech Aquatic Center; Referees: Andrey Afanasyev (RUS), Salah Hamici (ALG)
28 July 1996; 9:30	Score by quarters: 2–2, 2–0, 3–2, 3–2			Georgia Tech Aquatic Center; Referees: Andrey Afanasyev (RUS), Salah Hamici (ALG)
28 July 1996; 9:30	three players 2	Goals	Totolici, Hagiu 2	Georgia Tech Aquatic Center; Referees: Andrey Afanasyev (RUS), Salah Hamici (ALG)

== Weightlifting ==
Athlete	Event	Snatch		Clean & jerk		Total	Rank
Athlete	Event	Result	Rank	Result	Rank	Total	Rank
Andreas Behm	–70 kg	147.5	10	180.0	7	327.5	10
Andrey Poitschke	–76 kg	155.0	11	180.0	10	335.0	10
Ingo Steinhöfel	–76 kg	160.0	5	187.5	7	347.5	6
Marc Huster	–83 kg	170.0	2	212.5	1	382.5	2nd place, silver medalist(s)
Oliver Caruso	–91 kg	175.0	4	215.0	1	390.0	3rd place, bronze medalist(s)
Igor Sadykov	–99 kg	177.5	5	207.5	7	385.0	7
Mario Kalinke	–108 kg	177.5	8	212.5	10	390.0	9
Dimitri Prochorow	–108 kg	175.0	12	215.0	6	390.0	11
Manfred Nerlinger	+108 kg	185.0	7	237.5	5	422.5	6
Ronny Weller	+108 kg	200.0	1	255.0	2	455.0	2nd place, silver medalist(s)

== Wrestling ==
Greco-Roman

Athlete	Event	Round of 32	Round of 16	Quarterfinals	Semifinals	Repechage					Final	
Athlete	Event	Round of 32	Round of 16	Quarterfinals	Semifinals	Round 1	Round 2	Round 3	Round 4	Round 5	Final	
Athlete	Event	Opposition Result	Opposition Result	Opposition Result	Opposition Result	Opposition Result	Opposition Result	Opposition Result	Opposition Result	Opposition Result	Opposition Result	Rank
Oleg Kutscherenko	–48 kg	Zahidov (AZE); W 10–0	Sánchez (CUB); L 1–1	Did not advance		Bye	Kang (PRK); L 0–3	Did not advance				
Alfred Ter-Mkrtchyan	–52 kg	Al-Faraj (SYR); L 1–3	Did not advance			Rønningen (NOR); W 9–0	Vartanovas (LTU); W 8–0	Kalashnykov (UKR); L Fall	Did not advance			
Rifat Yildiz	–57 kg	Fernández (MEX); W 12–0	Sarmiento (CUB); W 4–1	Bye	Melnichenko (KAZ); L 0–3	Bye				Khakymov (UKR); L 2–3	Sarmiento (CUB); W Default	5
Erik Hahn	–74 kg	Kopytov (BLR); W 4–2	Dzyhasov (UKR); L 1–2	Did not advance		Bye	Katayama (JPN); W 5–2	Berzicza (HUN); W 3–1	Bye	Iskandaryan (RUS); W 8–5	Tracz (POL); L 2–4	4
Thomas Zander	–82 kg	Isisola (PER); W 10–0	Tsvir (RUS); W DQ	Bye	Tsitsiashvili (ISR); W 3–1	Bye					Yerlikaya (TUR); L 0–3	2nd place, silver medalist(s)
Maik Bullmann	–90 kg	Hussein (EGY); W 3–0	Sidorenko (BLR); W 1–0	Oliynyk (UKR); L 2–4	Did not advance	Bye		Dimitrov (BUL); W Fall	Waldroup (USA); W 4–0	Başar (TUR); W Fall	Sidorenko (BLR); W 2–0	3rd place, bronze medalist(s)
René Schiekel	–130 kg	Liu (CHN); W 3–0	Kékes (HUN); W 2–0	Bye	Ghaffari (USA); L 0–4	Bye				Mureiko (MDA); L 0–5	Poikilidis (GRE); L 0–3	6

Freestyle

Athlete	Event	Round of 32	Round of 16	Quarterfinals	Semifinals	Repechage					Final	
Athlete	Event	Round of 32	Round of 16	Quarterfinals	Semifinals	Round 1	Round 2	Round 3	Round 4	Round 5	Final	
Athlete	Event	Opposition Result	Opposition Result	Opposition Result	Opposition Result	Opposition Result	Opposition Result	Opposition Result	Opposition Result	Opposition Result	Opposition Result	Rank
Jürgen Scheibe	–62 kg	Calder (CAN); W 4–2	Azizov (RUS); L 2–8	Did not advance		Bye	Smal (BLR); L 1–8	Did not advance				
Alexander Leipold	–74 kg	Loizidis (GRE); W 6–0	Saitiev (RUS); L 1–3	Did not advance		Bye		Hohl (CAN); W 10–2	Haciyev (AZE); W 3–0	Paskalev (BUL); L 4–8	Monday (USA); W Default	5
Heiko Balz	–90 kg	Renney (AUS); W 11–1	Tedeyev (UKR); L 1–4	Did not advance		Bye	Bayramukov (KAZ); L 0–3	Did not advance				
Arawat Sabejew	–100 kg	Kovalevsky (BLR); W 3–0	Murtazaliev (UKR); L 3–13	Did not advance		Bye	Magomedov (AZE); W 3–1	Morales (CUB); W 3–2	Bye	Aleksandrov (KGZ); W 10–0	Kovalevsky (BLR); W 7–4	3rd place, bronze medalist(s)
Sven Thiele	–130 kg	Kovalevsky (KGZ); W 1–0	Feng (CHN); W 3–0	Bye	Medvedev (BLR); L 0–0	Bye				Baumgartner (USA); L 0–3	Kovalevsky (KGZ); L 1–3	6

== Notes ==
- Watkins, Ginger T., ed. (1997). The Official Report of the Centennial Olympic Games, Volume III The Competition Results (PDF). Atlanta: Peachtree Publishers. ISBN 1-56145-150-9. Archived from the original (PDF) on 2007-09-27.
- "Olympic Medal Winners". International Olympic Committee.
