= Water polo at the 1996 Summer Olympics – Men's team squads =

These are the rosters of all participating teams at the men's water polo tournament at the 1996 Summer Olympics in Atlanta.

== Croatia ==
The following players represented Croatia:

- Maro Balić
- Perica Bukić
- Damir Glavan
- Igor Hinić
- Vjekoslav Kobešćak
- Joško Kreković
- Ognjen Kržić
- Dubravko Šimenc
- Siniša Školneković
- Ratko Štritof
- Renato Vrbičić
- Tino Vegar
- Zdeslav Vrdoljak

== Greece ==
The following players represented Greece:

- Georgios Afroudakis
- Symeon Georgaras
- Filippos Kaiafas
- Theodoros Kalakonas
- Thomas Khatzis
- Theodoros Chatzitheodorou
- Theodoros Lorantos
- Konstantinos Loudis
- Georgios Mavrotas
- Tasos Papanastasiou
- Vangelis Patras
- Georgios Psykhos
- Gerasimos Voltyrakis

== Germany ==
The following players represented Germany:

- Ingo Borgmann
- Piotr Bukowski
- Oliver Dahler
- Jörg Dresel
- Torsten Dresel
- Davor Erjavec
- Michael Ilgner
- Dirk Klingenberg
- Raúl de la Peña
- René Reimann
- Uwe Sterzik
- Lars Tomanek
- Daniel Voß

== Hungary ==
The following players represented Hungary:

- Tibor Benedek
- Tamás Dala
- Rajmund Fodor
- András Gyöngyösi
- Tamás Kásás
- Zoltán Kósz
- Péter Kuna
- Attila Monostori
- Zsolt Németh
- Frank Tóth
- László Tóth
- Zsolt Varga
- Balázs Vincze

== Italy ==
The following players represented Italy:

- Alberto Angelini
- Francesco Attolico
- Fabio Bencivenga
- Alessandro Bovo
- Alessandro Calcaterra
- Roberto Calcaterra
- Marco Gerini
- Alberto Ghibellini
- Luca Giustolisi
- Amedeo Pomilio
- Francesco Postiglione
- Carlo Silipo
- Leonardo Sottani

== Netherlands ==
The following players represented the Netherlands:

- Arie van de Bunt
- Gert de Groot
- Arno Havenga
- Koos Issard
- Bas de Jong
- Niels van der Kolk
- Marco Kunz
- Harry van der Meer
- Hans Nieuwenburg
- Joeri Stoffels
- Eelco Uri
- Wyco de Vries

== Romania ==
The following players represented Romania:

- Edward Andrei
- Florin Bonca
- Robert Dinu
- Niculae Fulgeanu
- Vlad Hagiu
- Gelu Lisac
- Istvan Moldvai
- Daniel Radu
- Bogdan Rath
- Radu Sabău
- Ștefan Sanda
- Dinel Stemate
- Liviu Totolici

== Russia ==
The following players represented Russia:

- Dmitry Apanasenko
- Dmitry Dugin
- Sergey Garbuzov
- Dmitry Gorshkov
- Sergey Ivlev
- Vladimir Karabutov
- Ilya Konstantinov
- Nikolay Kozlov
- Nikolay Maksimov
- Aleksey Panfili
- Yury Smolovoy
- Aleksandr Yeryshov
- Sergey Yevstigneyev

== Spain ==
The following players represented Spain:

- Josep Maria Abarca
- Ángel Andreo
- Daniel Ballart
- Manuel Estiarte
- Pedro García
- Salvador Gómez
- Iván Moro
- Miki Oca
- Jorge Payá
- Sergi Pedrerol
- Jesús Rollán
- Carles Sans
- Jordi Sans

== Ukraine ==
The following players represented Ukraine:

- Dmytro Andriyev
- Ihor Horbach
- Vadym Kebalo
- Vitaliy Khalchaytskiy
- V'iacheslav Kostanda
- Andriy Kovalenko
- Oleksandr Potulnytskiy
- Vadym Rozhdestvenskiy
- Vadym Skuratov
- Anatoliy Solodun
- Dmitry Stratan
- Oleh Volodymyrov
- Oleksiy Yehorov

== United States ==
The following players represented the United States:

- Gavin Arroyo
- Troy Barnhart Jr.
- Chris Duplanty
- Mike Evans
- Kirk Everist
- Dan Hackett
- Chris Humbert
- Kyle Kopp
- Jeremy Laster
- Rick McNair
- Chris Oeding
- Alex Rousseau
- Wolf Wigo

== Yugoslavia ==
The following players represented Yugoslavia:

- Viktor Jelenić
- Igor Milanović
- Ranko Perović
- Dejan Savić
- Vaso Subotić
- Aleksandar Šapić
- Aleksandar Šoštar
- Milan Tadić
- Petar Trbojević
- Veljko Uskoković
- Mirko Vičević
- Vladimir Vujasinović
- Predrag Zimonjić
