= Dresel =

Dresel is a surname. Notable people with the surname include:

- Bernie Dresel (born 1961), American studio drummer and percussionist
- Ellis Loring Dresel (1865–1925), American lawyer and diplomat
- Jörg Dresel (born 1968), German water polo player
- Otto Dresel (1826–1890), German-born American pianist, music teacher, and composer
- Torsten Dresel (born 1967), German water polo player

== See also ==
- Dressel, another surname
