= Dahler =

Dahler is a surname. Notable people with the surname include:

- Don Dahler (born 1960), American journalist and writer
- Ed Dahler (1926–2012), American basketball player
- Lucien Dähler (born 2001), Swiss footballer
- Oliver Dahler (born 1969), German water polo player
- P. F. Dahler (1883–1948), Dutch politician
- Wolfgang Dahler (born 1975), German politician

== See also ==
- Bahler
