= Ilya Konstantinov =

Ilya Konstantinov may refer to:

- Ilya Konstantinov (water polo)
- Ilya Konstantinov (politician)
