= Daniel Radu =

Daniel Radu can refer to:

- Daniel Radu (boxer) (born 1959), a Romanian boxer
- Daniel Radu (judoka) (born 1957), a Romanian judoka
- Daniel Radu (water polo) (born 1977), a Romanian water polo player

== See also ==
- Dan Ghica-Radu
