= Sabău =

Sabău is a Romanian-language surname derived from the Hungarian surname Szabó. Notable people with the surname include:

- Antoaneta Sabău (born 1982), Romanian classicist, translator and editor
- Ioan Sabău (born 1968), Romanian footballer and manager
- Radu Sabău (born 1968), Romanian water polo player
- Răzvan Sabău (born 1977), Romanian retired professional tennis player

== See also ==
- Szabó
