= Erjavec =

Erjavec is a South Slavic surname, occurring mainly in Slovenia and Croatia. Notable people with the surname include:

- Davor Erjavec (born 1970), German water polo player
- Karl Erjavec (born 1960), Slovenian lawyer and politician
- Mladen Erjavec (born 1970), Croatian basketball coach and player
- Nataša Erjavec (born 1968), Slovenian athlete
- Veronika Erjavec (born 1999), Slovenian tennis player

== See also ==
- Mali Erjavec, village in Croatia
