= Al-Habashi =

Al-Habashi is an Arabic-language word meaning "the Ethiopian". It may refer to the following notable people:

- Bilāl al-Ḥabashī (c. 580–640), companion of the Islamic prophet Muhammad
- Dukhail Al-Habashi (born 1975), Kuwaiti table tennis player
- Wael Sulaiman Al-Habashi (born 1964), Kuwaiti retired football player
- Sultan Al-Hebshi (born 1983 or 1985), Saudi shot putter

== See also ==
- Al-Ahbash, Sufi religious movement and Lebanese political party
