= Dressel =

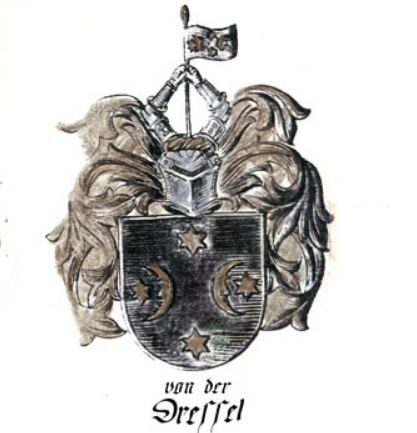
Dressel coat of arms as depicted in Johann Siebmacher's "Wappenbuch" (1605)

The Dressel family history begins with Benedictus de Benehusin, who lived in the middle of the 11th Century. He was a free noble vassal of the abbot of Hersfeld monastery in Hessen. He gave his first name to his estate, which was originally called Benehusin and later called Bennenhus, Beinhausen, Benhausen, etc. Today it is called Beenhausen. It is located in the hill and forest area of Northeastern Hessen, between Fulda and Schwalm in the Gemeinde Ludwigsau on the stream called Rohrbach, in the former Landkreis Rotenburg.

The unbroken Dressel pedigree begins with Nortmann de Benehusin documented 1179, gen. I.

The von Bennhausen sold their properties in the Bennhausen Kreis Rotenberg area at the end of the 14th Century and moved east to Thuringia. Then their name often appears in documents from the Eisenach area, as having estates there, and serving as Burgmen, (Castellans for the Dukes of Thuringia). The Benhausen line became extinct in Thuringia toward the end of the 15th Century.

== The Beenhausen-Dressel connection ==
The de Benehusin and the de Dressel are considered to be the same family for the following historical and sociological reasons:

1. In the 14th century, the Bennhausen and Dressel families had the same coat of arms. The earliest known example of the Bennhausen arms is a seal dated 1314 (ex. 38.2) The earliest known Dressel arms is a seal dated 1361, (ex. 38.2a) The shields of both seals are identical.
2. Both the Bennhausen and Dressel occasionally used variations of their charge (shield figures) as their family Crest.
3. The family colors, black & gold (sometimes blue & gold) are the same for both families.
4. Both families during the 14th Century used similar first names:

Conrad de Bennhausen, doc. 1337	Conrad de Dressel, doc. 1323
Heinz de Beenhausen, doc. 1381	Heinz de Dressel, doc. 1380
Johanis de Bennhausen, doc. 1330	Johanis de Dressel, doc. 1376
Johanis de Bennhausen, doc. 1401	Johanis de Drossel, doc. 1408

The Bennhausen and Dressel family members were Hessen, Thuringian and Saxon knights. The social history of this class is, therefore, also that of the Bennhausen-Dressel family. The documented history of German knighthood as a class begins with the death of Emperor Otto II in 983 AD, because, by this time, social customs and laws existed that defined this group. However, some of their traditions date back not only to the court of Charlemagne the Great, 742-814 AD, but also to the knightly class of the Roman Empire. Some historians now believe that the early medieval German knightly families originated from the original German tribal nobility.

Rule, born circa 1270, was a member of the von Bennhausen family who immigrated to Saxony, as did so many knights from Thuringia in the late part of the 1200s. In the document dated 1319, ex.3, he is referred to as dictus de Drysiule, which can be translated, who is now called de Drysiule. He received the hereditary fief (estate) called Dreiseil from the Duke of Saxony. His descendants took the name of the estate for their family name. Rule de Drysule (Dresul, Drisule) begins the Dressel branch of the family pedigree, ex 3.; VI.4.

== List of people with surname Dressel ==
- Andreas Dressel (born 1975), German politician
- Caeleb Dressel (born 1996), American swimmer
- Birgit Dressel (1960–1987), German heptathlete
- Chris Dressel (born 1961), American football player
- Delverne Dressel, American lacrosse player
- Erwin Dressel (1909–1972), German composer and pianist
- Heinrich Dressel (1845–1920), German archaeologist
- James K. Dressel (1943–1992), state representative in the Michigan legislature
- Lucian W. Dressel (born 1940), American winemaker, grapevine breeder, classical composer
- Paul Dressel (1910-1989), American educational psychologist
- Shelby Dressel (born 1990), American Country Singer-Songwriter
- Waltraud Dressel (1893 – 1940), German freestyle swimmer
- Wilma Dressel (born 1983), German rower

== See also ==
- Dresel
