= Gavin Arroyo =

American water polo player (born 1972)

Personal information
- Full name: Gavin Baxter Arroyo
- Born: May 10, 1972 (age 54) Orange, California, U.S.
- Occupations: Water Polo Coach; *Long Beach State; *US National Team 1993-2000
- Height: 190 cm (6 ft 3 in)
- Weight: 86 kg (190 lb)

Sport
- Country: United States
- Sport: Water polo
- College team: University of California Berkeley
- Coached by: Steve Heaston (UC Berkeley); Richard Corso (1996 Olympics); John Vargas (2000 Olympics)
Medal record
Men's water polo
Representing the United States
FINA World Cup
Gold medal – first place	1997 Athens	Team
Pan American Games
Gold medal – first place	1995 Mar del Plata	Team
Gold medal – first place	1999 Winnipeg	Team

Gavin Baxter Arroyo (born May 10, 1972) is a former water polo defender from the United States, who competed in two Summer Olympics (1996 and 2000) for his native country. He was part of the United States national team that won the gold medal in the 1997 FINA World Cup in Athens. Beginning in 2006, Arroyo had a long career as the Men's Water Polo Coach for Long Beach State, and coached the women's team from 2009 to 2020. At the international level, he served as an Assistant Water Polo Coach for the Men's US team at the 2020 Tokyo Olympics, and was on the US men's water polo coaching staff for the 2024 Paris Olympics. He has been honored as an inductee of both the USA Water Polo Hall of Fame, and the California Athletics Hall of Fame.

Arroyo was born May 10, 1972 in Orange California. He attended Villa Park High School, where as a Senior, he was honored as a swimmer of the year and water polo player of the year.

== University of California Berkeley ==
Arroyo attended and played water polo for the University of California Berkeley where he was managed and trained by Coach Steve Heaston, a water polo Hall of Fame inductee, who had formerly served as an Assistant Water Polo Coach at the 1988 Olympic Games, where the US men's team won a silver medal. At UC Berkeley, Arroyo received All-American honors in both 1992 and 1993. He played a significant role in helping to lead UC Berkeley varsity water polo team to three consecutive NCAA National Championship team titles from 1990 to 1992. In the 1992 season, the UC Berkeley's varsity water polo team went undefeated.

== 1996 Atlanta Olympics ==
Arroyo competed with the US team at the 1996 Olympic water polo tournament under Head Coach Richard Corso, a USA Hall of Fame inductee, where the US team placed seventh overall among twelve competing nations. One of Arroyo's Olympic teammates was Chris Oeding, the second highest scorer on the US Olympic team. Though Hungary and Italy were the strong pre-Olympic favorites, Spain defeated Hungary 7–6 in the semi-finals. In the final game Spain beat Croatia, and captured the gold medal with a score of 7-5, leaving Croatia the silver medal, and pre-game favorite Italy the bronze.

== 2000 Sydney Olympics ==
Arroyo participated with the US Men's water polo team for the second time at the 2000 Sydney Olympics under Olympic Coach John Vargas. Arroyo was part of the US team that completed the Olympics with an overall sixth-place finish among twelve competing countries. In preliminary rounds, the US team defeated the Netherlands and Croatia, both traditionally strong teams, but lost their last match in the final round 10–8 to Italy. Perennial pre-game favorite Hungary took the gold medal, Russia took the silver, and the historically dominant team from Yugoslavia took the bronze, having had more total goals than the United States. Hungary easily defeated rival Russia in the final game by a score of 13-6, leading in each of the first three periods by a score of 3-1, 8-2, and 10-4 respectively.

In international amateur competition, Arroyo won a gold medal at the Pan American games in 1995 in Mar del Plata, and another Pan American Gold medal at the Pan American Games in 1999 in Winnipeg, Ontario, Canada. In the FINA World Cup, he won a team gold medal at the 1997 Games in Athens, Greece.

=== Professional water polo ===
In professional water polo, he played overseas for seven years for five professional teams. In Greece, he played for Olympiacos, Vouliagmeni, Glyfada and in Spain for Barcelona and CN Atlètic-Barceloneta. As a member of Olympiacos from 1997 to 1999, Arroyo won the Greek Championship (1999), the Greek Cup (1998) and the Greek Super Cup (1998) and was twice runner-up of the LEN Cup Winners' Cup in 1998 and 1999.

== Coaching ==
Since 2006, Arroyo has served as the Men's Water Polo Coach for Long Beach State, known currently as California State University, Long Beach. He has coached the women's water polo teams at Long Beach State beginning in 2009 through 2020. In his Long Beach State coaching career through 2025, he earned a combined record of 294-217. A highly accomplished collegiate coach, he was a three-time Coach of the Year three times while at Long Beach State.

Also active at an international level, he served as an Assistant Water Polo Coach for the US Men's Water Polo team at the 2020 Tokyo Olympics, and was on the US men's water polo coaching staff for the 2024 Paris Olympics. He served on the staff of the US National team from 1993 to 2000. He has also served with the Junior Olympic National Teams.

=== Honors ===
In 2020, Arroyo was inducted into the USA Water Polo Hall of Fame. In 2022, Arroyo became a member of the California Athletics Hall of Fame to honor his achievements in water polo at the University of California Berkeley, at the Olympics as both a coach and player, and for his coaching career with Long Beach State University.
