= Christine Francke =

German retired football goalkeeper

Personal information
- Date of birth: 12 June 1974 (age 52)
- Place of birth: Germany
- Position: Goalkeeper

International career
Years	Team	Apps	(Gls)
1996	Germany	2	

Christine Francke (born 12 June 1974) is a German retired football goalkeeper. She was part of the Germany women's national football team at the 1996 Summer Olympics, but did not compete.

== See also ==
- Germany at the 1996 Summer Olympics
