= Nemenčinė =

- City
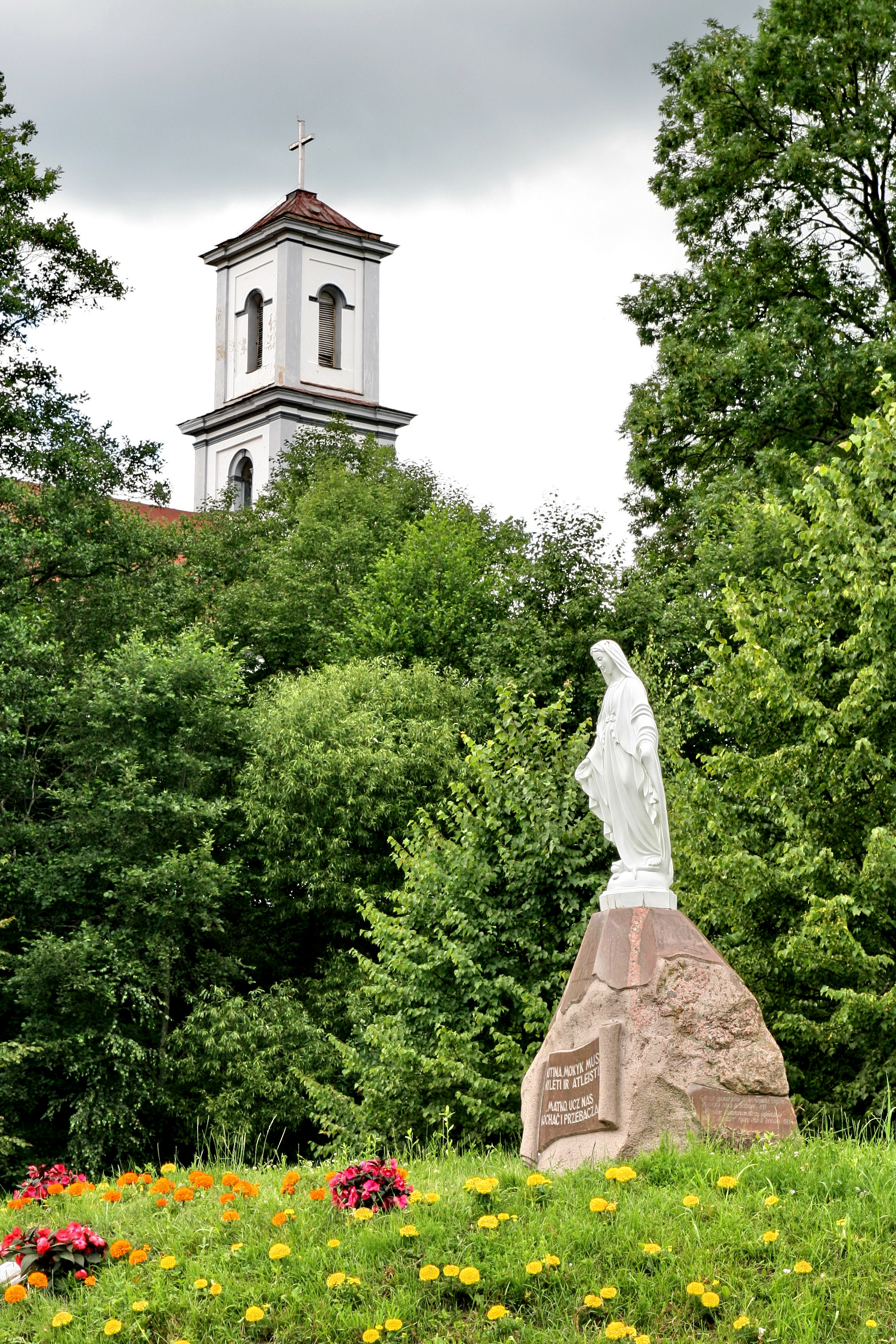
- Sculpture of Mary at the center of the city and the church

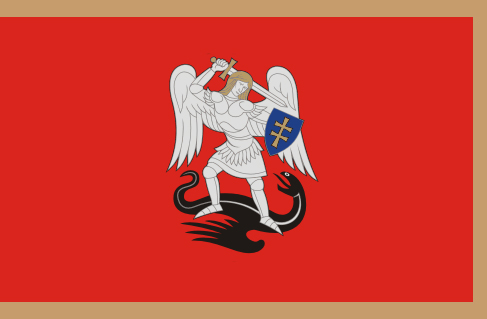
- Flag Coat of arms

- Location of Nemenčinė
- Coordinates: 54°51′0″N 25°29′0″E
- Country: Lithuania
- Ethnographic region: Dzūkija
- County: Vilnius County
- Municipality: Vilnius district municipality
- Eldership: Nemenčinė eldership
- Capital of: Nemenčinė eldership
- First mentioned: 14th century
- Granted town rights: 1955

Area
  - Total: 5 km^{2} (1.9 sq mi)

Population (2022)Densityː 916/km2
  - Total: 4,582
- Time zone: UTC+2 (EET)
  - Summer (DST): UTC+3 (EEST)

Nemenčinė (Lithuanian pronunciation: [nʲɛmɛnʲˈt͡ɕiːnʲeː]; Polish: Niemenczyn) is a city in Vilnius district municipality, Lithuania, it is located only about 7 kilometres (4.3 mi) north-east of Vilnius. Close to Nemenčinė forest was planted which forms a sentence Žalgiris 600 (commemorating the Battle of Grunwald) visible from the air. Nemenčinė is the only city in Lithuania, where it has a subarctic climate (Koppen: Dfc) with 1-3 months above 10 °C 50 °F, And January averages lower than 0 °C 32 °F.

== Names ==
Nemenčinė is the original name of the town reflected in historical documents and still in use today. It derives from a Lithuanian word referring to the river Nemenčia. Other versions of the name include Niemenczyn in Polish, Неменчын in Belarusian, Неменчине (or Нямянчине) in Russian, Nementschine in German and Nementchin (נעמענטשין) in Yiddish.

Nemenčinė was the location of one of many Roman Catholic churches where the priests had to know the Lithuanian language according to the Grand Duke of Lithuania Alexander Jagiellon in 1501

== History ==
Lithuanian wooden castle and the mound stood in Nemenčinė in 10-14th centuries. The settlement started to grow around the castle. In 1387, following the Christianization of Lithuania, Jogaila established the first Christian parish in Nemenčinė and built a church there. In a 1434 document Andrius Sakaitis, one of the most influential Lithuanian noble families during the reign of Grand Duke of Lithuania Casimir IV Jagiellon, listed Nemenčinė as his domain. In 1554, Nemenčinė after the Volok Reform got the rights of the town.

In 1613, the town was marked on the map of the Grand Duchy of Lithuania – Magni Ducatus Lithuaniae, et Regionum Adiacentium exacta Descriptio printed in Amsterdam and financed by the Lithuanian magnate Mikołaj Krzysztof Radziwiłł the Orphan.

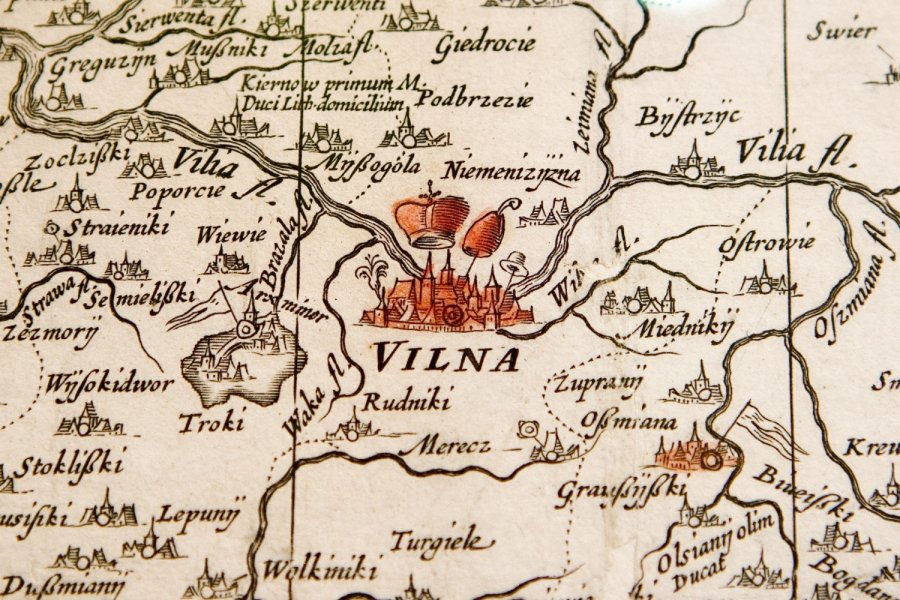
Fragment of a map of the Grand Duchy of Lithuania (1613) and Nemenčinė (Niemenizijina), shown just north of the capital Vilnius (Vilna).

Nemenčinė was administratively located in the Wilno Voivodeship of Poland in the interbellum.

During World War II, it was occupied by the Soviet Union from 1940, then by Nazi Germany from 1941, and then re-occupied by the Soviet Union in 1944. On 20 September 1941, 403 Jews from the town were massacred in a mass execution. 128 men, 186 women and 99 children were shot by an Einsatzgruppen of local Nazi collaborators. In 1971, a monument was erected on the execution site.

== Ethnic composition ==
The ethnic composition of Nemenčinė is as follows:

Total population in 2011 – 5054

- Poles 56,5% (2858)
- Lithuanians 27,1% (1368)
- Russians 9,2% (463)
- Belarusians 3,6% (183)
- Ukrainians 0,9% (43)
- Others 2,4% (120)

Total population in 2021 – 4831

- Poles 55,7% (2690)
- Lithuanians 29,1% (1407)
- Russians 8,1% (391)
- Belarusians 2,9% (138)
- Ukrainians 0,8% (38)
- Others 3,3% (160)

== International partnership ==
Nemenčinė is twinned with three towns in Poland: Węgorzewo, Ełk and Suwałki. It also has a partnership agreement with Poland's West Pomeranian Voivodeship, signed in Vilnius on 19 June 2009.

== Sports ==
In 14 of September 2017 Nemenčinė Biathlon Stadium was opened and become a second operating Biathlon course in Lithuania (first being Ignalina Winter Sports Centre).

== People ==
- Zdzisław Balicki (1930–1995), Sejm deputy of the Polish People's Republic
- Miroslava Ritskiavitchius, Lithuanian handball player that represented Germany at 1996 Olympics
