= Taeko Todo =

Japanese table tennis player

Taeko Todo (東童 多英子, Tōdō Taeko) (born 25 October 1968 in Liaoning, China), born Zhao Duoduo (Chinese: 赵多多), is a Chinese-born table tennis player who represented Japan at the 1996 Summer Olympics.
