= Jan Fegter =

German handball player (born 1969)

Personal information
- Nickname: Fege
- Nationality: Germany
- Born: 19 September 1969 (age 57) Norden, West Germany
- Height: 191 cm (75 in)

Sport
- Sport: Handball
- Position: Right back / Left back

Senior clubs
- Years: Team
- 1987-1990: SG VTB/Altjührden
- 1990-1992: Bayer Leverkusen
- 1992-1995: SG Hameln
- 1995-2003: SG Flensburg-Handewitt
- 1995-2003: Wilhelmshavener HV
- 2006-2007: SG Flensburg-Handewitt II
National team
Years	Team	Apps	(Gls)
1994-?	Germany	61	(167)
- Updated on 2014

Jan Fegter (born 19 September 1969) is a German male handball player. He was a member of the Germany men's national handball team. He was part of the team at the 1996 Summer Olympics, playing five matches. On club level he played for SG Flensburg-Handewitt in Flensburg.
