= Miroslava Ritskiavitchius =

German handball player (born 1964)

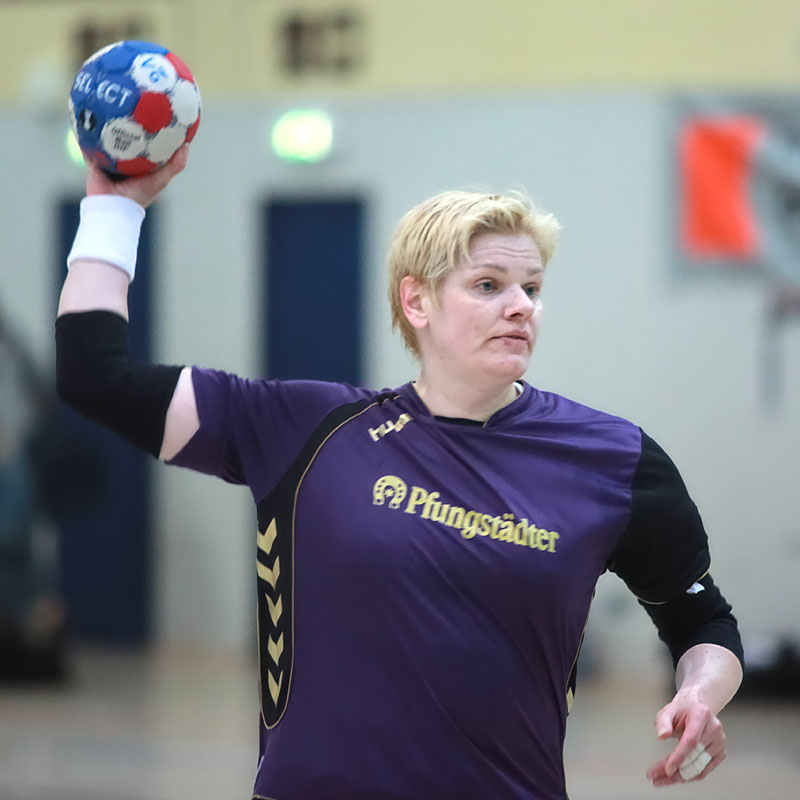
- Miroslava Ritskiavitchius in 2011

Personal information
- Nationality: German
- Born: 23 February 1964 (age 62) Nemenčinė, Lithuanian SSR, Soviet Union
- Height: 179 cm (70 in)

Sport
- Sport: Handball
- Position: Left back

Senior clubs
- Years: Team
- -1997: TV Lützellinden
- 1997-1998: VfL Waiblingen
- 1998-2000: HC Leipzig
- 2000-2006: TV Lützellinden
- 2011-2014: FSG Crumstadt/Goddelau
- 2014-?: TSG Ober-Eschbach
National team
Years	Team		
–	Lithuania		
–	Germany	81	(274)
Medal record
World Championship
Bronze medal – third place	1997 Germany

Miroslava Ritskiavitchius (Lithuanian: Miroslava Trainovskaja-Rickevičienė; born 23 February 1964) is a German handball player of Lithuanian descent. She competed in the women's tournament at the 1996 Summer Olympics.
