= Marlies Waelzer =

German handball player (born 1970)

Personal information
- Nationality: German
- Born: 13 February 1970 (age 55) Hamburg, West Germany

Sport
- Sport: Handball

Marlies Waelzer (born 13 February 1970) is a German handball player. She competed in the women's tournament at the 1996 Summer Olympics.
