= Kathrin Dumitru =

German swimmer

Personal information
- Born: 30 October 1980 (age 46) Fulda, West Germany
- Height: 176 cm (5 ft 9 in)
- Weight: 60 kg (130 lb)

Sport
- Sport: Swimming
- Strokes: Breaststroke
- Club: SC Magdeburg

Kathrin Dumitru (born 30 October 1980) is a German former swimmer. She competed in three events at the 1996 Summer Olympics.
