= Christian Scheffler =

German handball player (born 1972)

Personal information
- Nationality: German
- Born: 29 March 1972 (age 54) Hamburg, West Germany
- Height: 183 cm (72 in)

Sport
- Sport: Handball
- Position: Left wing

Youth career
- Years: Team
- 1982-1985: Niendorfer TSV
- 1985-1991: TSV Ellerbek

Senior clubs
- Years: Team
- 1991-2003: THW Kiel
- 2003-?: Polizei SV Kiel
National team
Years	Team	Apps	(Gls)
1993-?	Germany	49	(107)

Christian Scheffler (born 29 March 1972) is a German handball player. He competed in the men's tournament at the 1996 Summer Olympics.

== Club career ==
He played most of his career for THW Kiel, where she won the German Championship in 1994, 1995, 1996, 1998, 1999, 2000 and 2002 and the DHB-Pokal in 1998, 1999 and 2000.
