= Holger Löhr =

German handball player (born 1970)

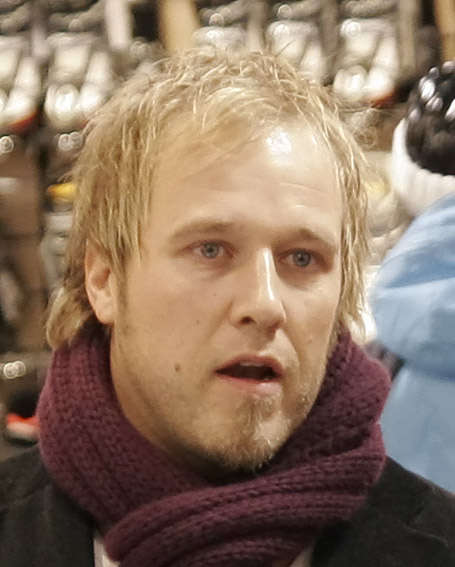

Personal information
- Nationality: Germany
- Born: 25 July 1970 (age 56) Heidelberg, West Germany
- Height: 171 cm (67 in)

Sport
- Sport: Handball
- Position: Right wing

Senior clubs
- Years: Team
- 1986-?: TSV Oftersheim
- –: VfL Pfullingen
- -1995: SG Leutershausen
- 1995-1998: VfL Gummersbach
- 1998-1999: TV Großwallstadt
- 1999-2002: SG Willstätt/Schutterwald
- 2002-2005: SG Kronau-Östringen
National team
Years	Team	Apps	(Gls)
1991-?	Germany	119	(219)

Teams managed
- 2007-2013: SG Leutershausen
- 2017-2021: HG Oftersheim/Schwetzingen
- 2024-: Rhein-Neckar Löwen II

Holger Löhr (born 25 July 1970) is a German male handball coach and former player. Currently he is the coach at the German club Rhein-Neckar Löwens second team. He was a member of the Germany men's national handball team. He was part of the team at the 1996 Summer Olympics, playing three matches. On club level he played for SG Leutershausen, VfL Gummersbach TV Großwallstadt, SG Willstätt/Schutterwald and SG Kronau-Östringen. He won 119 international caps and scored 219 goals. He also participated in the 1993 World Championships, and the 1995 and 1998 Europeans.
