= Rohrbach (Fulda) =

River in Germany

Location
- Country: Germany
- State: Hesse

Physical characteristics
- Mouth
  - location: Fulda
  - coordinates: 50.9087°N 9.7524°E
- Length: 17.9 km (11.1 mi)

Basin features
- Progression: Fulda→ Weser→ North Sea

Rohrbach is a river of Hesse, Germany. It is a left tributary of the Fulda in Ludwigsau.

== See also ==
- List of rivers of Hesse
