= Karsten Kohlhaas =

German handball player (born 1970)

Personal information
- Nationality: Germany
- Born: 4 April 1970 (age 56) Dortmund, West Germany
- Height: 200 cm (79 in)

Sport
- Sport: Handball
- Position: Left back

Senior clubs
- Years: Team
- 2002: OSC Dortmund
- 2002: TUSEM Essen
- -1996: TSV Bayer Dormagen
- 1996-1998: VfL Gummersbach
- 1998-2002: HSG Nordhorn
- 2002: HSG Schwerte/Westhofen
National team
Years	Team	Apps	(Gls)
1989-2002	Germany	97	(184)

Karsten Kohlhaas (born 4 April 1970) is a German male handball player. He was a member of the Germany men's national handball team. He was part of the team at the 1996 Summer Olympics, playing three matches. On club level he played for TSV Bayer Dormagen.
