= Bahler =

Bahler, Bähler or Baehler is a surname. Notable people with the surname include:

- Liane Bahler (1982–2007), German cyclist
- John Bahler (born 1940), American musician
- Tom Bahler (born 1943), American musician
- Heidi Zeller-Bähler (born 1967), Swiss alpine skier
