= Sibylle Merk =

German yacht racer

Sibylle Merk (born as Sibylle Powarzynski, 5 February 1968) is a German former yacht racer who competed in the 1996 Summer Olympics.
