= Martín Castillo =

Martín Castillo may refer to:

- Martin Castillo (Miami Vice character), fictional character in TV series Miami Vice, played by Edward James Olmos
- Martín Castillo (boxer), Mexican boxer
- Marty Castillo, baseball player
- Martín Castillo (footballer) (born 1988), Mexican footballer
