= Emilia Luca =

German handball player (born 1969)

Personal information
- Nationality: German-Romanian
- Born: 4 October 1969 (age 57) Bacău, Romania
- Height: 174 cm (69 in)

Sport
- Sport: Handball
- Position: Right wing
National team
Years	Team	Apps
–	Romania	85
–	Germany	56

Emilia Luca (born 4 October 1969) is a German-Romanian handball player, who played for both the Romanian and the German national team. Representing Germany, she competed in the women's tournament at the 1996 Summer Olympics. At club level she played for HC Știința Bacău in Romania and TV Lützellinden, TV Mainzlar and TSG Leihgestern in Germany. In the 1998–99 season she was the top scorer in the German Bundesliga.
