= Liviu Totolici =

Romanian water polo player

Personal information
- Born: 1 January 1969 (age 56)

Sport
- Sport: Water polo

Liviu Totolici (born 1 January 1969) is a Romanian former water polo player who competed in the 1996 Summer Olympics.
