= Michael Ilgner =

German water polo player

Personal information
- Nationality: German
- Born: 1 May 1971 (age 53); Werneck, West Germany

Sport
- Sport: Water polo

Michael Ilgner (born 1 May 1971) is a German former water polo player. He competed in the men's tournament at the 1996 Summer Olympics.
