= Uwe Sterzik =

German water polo player

Personal information
- Nationality: German
- Born: 27 April 1966 (age 58); Ostrov, Czechoslovakia

Sport
- Sport: Water polo

Uwe Sterzik (born 27 April 1966) is a German water polo player. He competed at the 1988 Summer Olympics, the 1992 Summer Olympics and the 1996 Summer Olympics. During his career, he won more than 340 international caps and later became the coach of the Swiss national team.
