= Daniel Radu (water polo) =

Romanian water polo player

Personal information
- Full name: Cătălin Daniel Radu
- Nationality: Romanian
- Born: 24 April 1977 (age 47); Bucharest, Romania

Sport
- Sport: Water polo

Daniel Radu (born 24 April 1977) is a Romanian former water polo player who competed in the 1996 Summer Olympics.
