= Vlad Hagiu =

Romanian water polo player

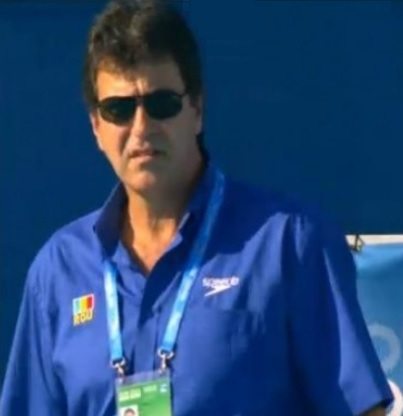

Personal information
- Born: 29 March 1963 (age 63) Bucharest, Romania

Sport
- Sport: Water polo
- Position: Wing

Senior clubs
- Years: Team
- 1979–1990 1990–1996 1996–1997 1997–1998 1998–2001 2001–2004: Dinamo Bucharest; Ortigia Siracusa; Dinamo Bucharest; Rari Nantes Cagliari; Sportiva Nervi; Sporting Club Quinto
National team
- Years: Team
- 1980–2000: Romania

Teams coached
- 2004–2008 2008–2009 2009–2010 2010–2013 2010–2013 2013–2014 2014–: Romania; Steaua Bucharest; Romania U19; Germany U19; WU Magdeburg; Romania; Romania (women)
Medal record
Men's water polo
Representing Romania
Summer Universiade
Bronze medal – third place	1981 Bucharest	Team

Vlad Hagiu (born 29 March 1963) is a Romanian coach and former water polo player who competed in the 1996 Summer Olympics.

== Achievements ==
=== Player ===
Dinamo Bucharest

- Romanian Superliga: 1979, 1980, 1982, 1983, 1984, 1987, 1988, 1989, 1990, 1997
- LEN Cup Winners' Cup runner-up: 1986

Romania

- European Water Polo Championship: 4th place: 1993

=== Individual ===
- Top Scorer of the 1991 World Championship: 25 goals.

=== Head coach ===
Romania

- European Water Polo Championship: 4th place: 2006

Steaua Bucharest

- Romanian Cup: 2009
