= Radu Sabău =

Romanian water polo player

Personal information
- Born: March 8, 1968 (age 57); Brașov, Romania

Sport
- Sport: Water polo

Radu Sabău (born 8 March 1968) is a Romanian former water polo player who competed in the 1996 Summer Olympics.
