= René Reimann =

German water polo player

Personal information
- Nationality: German
- Born: 9 May 1967 (age 57); West Berlin, West Germany

Sport
- Sport: Water polo

René Reimann (born 9 May 1967) is a German water polo player. He competed at the 1988 Summer Olympics, the 1992 Summer Olympics and the 1996 Summer Olympics.
