= Niels van der Kolk =

Dutch water polo player (born 1970)

Personal information
- Nationality: Dutch
- Born: 7 October 1970 (age 54); Veenendaal, Netherlands

Sport
- Sport: Water polo

Niels van der Kolk (born 7 October 1970) is a Dutch water polo player. He competed in the men's tournament at the 1996 Summer Olympics.
