= Daniel Voß =

German water polo player

Personal information
- Nationality: German
- Born: 28 March 1971 (age 55) Hamm, West Germany

Sport
- Sport: Water polo

Daniel Voß (born 28 March 1971) is a German former water polo player. He competed in the men's tournament at the 1996 Summer Olympics.

== See also ==
- Germany men's Olympic water polo team records and statistics
- List of men's Olympic water polo tournament goalkeepers
