= Piotr Bukowski =

German water polo player

Personal information
- Nationality: German
- Born: 10 March 1963 (age 62); Gorzów Wielkopolski, Poland

Sport
- Sport: Water polo

Piotr Bukowski (born 10 March 1963) is a German water polo player. He competed at the 1992 Summer Olympics and the 1996 Summer Olympics.
