= Ilya Konstantinov (water polo) =

Russian water polo player

Personal information
- Nationality: Russian
- Born: 23 March 1970 (age 55)

Sport
- Sport: Water polo

Ilya Konstantinov (born 23 March 1970) is a Russian water polo player. He competed in the men's tournament at the 1996 Summer Olympics.
