= Lars Tomanek =

German water polo player

Personal information
- Nationality: German
- Born: 2 November 1965 (age 59); Peine, West Germany

Sport
- Sport: Water polo

Lars Tomanek (born 2 November 1965) is a German former water polo player. He competed in the men's tournament at the 1996 Summer Olympics.
