= Dukhail Al-Habashi =

Kuwaiti table tennis player

Personal information
- Nationality: Kuwait
- Born: 9 September 1975 (age 49)

Sport
- Sport: Table tennis

Dukhail Al-Habashi (born 9 September 1975) is a Kuwaiti table tennis player. He competed in the 1996 Summer Olympics. He is considered one of the greatest Kuwaiti table tennis players.
