= Oliver Dahler =

German water polo player

Personal information
- Nationality: German
- Born: 19 October 1969 (age 55); Krefeld, West Germany

Sport
- Sport: Water polo

Oliver Dahler (born 19 October 1969) is a German former water polo player. He competed in the men's tournament at the 1996 Summer Olympics.
