= Jörg Dresel =

German water polo player

Personal information
- Nationality: German
- Born: 25 December 1968 (age 56); Hagen, West Germany

Sport
- Sport: Water polo

Jörg Dresel (born 25 December 1968) is a German water polo player. He competed at the 1992 Summer Olympics and the 1996 Summer Olympics.
