= Davor Erjavec =

German water polo player

Personal information
- Nationality: German/Croatien
- Born: 28 February 1970 (age 55) Zagreb, Yugoslavia

Sport
- Sport: Water polo

Davor Erjavec (born 28 February 1970 in Zagreb, Croatia) is a German water polo player. He competed in the men's tournament at the 1996 Summer Olympics.
