= Torsten Dresel =

German water polo player

Personal information
- Nationality: German
- Born: 25 April 1967 (age 57); Hagen, West Germany

Sport
- Sport: Water polo

Torsten Dresel (born 25 April 1967) is a German water polo player. He competed at the 1992 Summer Olympics and the 1996 Summer Olympics.
