= Rowing at the 1992 Summer Olympics – Women's eight =

Women's eight at the Games of the XXV Olympiad
- Date: 28 July – 2 August 1992
- Competitors: 72 from 8 nations

Medalists
1st place, gold medalist(s)		Kirsten Barnes; Shannon Crawford; Megan Delehanty; Kathleen Heddle; Marnie McBean; Jessica Monroe; Brenda Taylor; Lesley Thompson; Kay Worthington	Canada
2nd place, silver medalist(s)		Viorica Neculai; Adriana Bazon; Maria Păduraru; Iulia Bulie; Doina Robu; Victoria Lepădatu; Doina Șnep-Bălan; Elena Georgescu; Ioana Olteanu	Romania
3rd place, bronze medalist(s)		Sylvia Dördelmann; Kathrin Haacker; Christiane Harzendorf; Daniela Neunast; Cerstin Petersmann; Dana Pyritz; Annegret Strauch; Ute Schell; Judith Zeidler	Germany

The women's eight competition at the 1992 Summer Olympics took place at took place at Lake of Banyoles, Spain.

== Competition format ==
The competition consisted of two main rounds (heats and finals) as well as a repechage. The 8 boats were divided into two heats for the first round, with 4 boats in each heat. The first-place boat in each heat (2 boats total) advanced directly to the "A" final. The remaining 6 boats were placed in the repechage. The repechage featured a single heat. The top 4 boats in the repechage advanced to the "A" final, while the remaining 2 boats (5th and 6th placers in the repechage) were sent to the "B" final.

The boats in the "A" final competed for medals and 4th through 6th place; the boats in the "B" final competed for 7th and 8th.

All races were over a 2000 metre course.

== Results ==
=== Heats ===
==== Heat 1 ====
Rank	Rowers	Coxswain	Nation	Time	Notes
1	Kirsten Barnes; Shannon Crawford; Megan Delehanty; Kathleen Heddle; Marnie McBean; Jessica Monroe; Brenda Taylor; Kay Worthington	Lesley Thompson	Canada	6:11.44	QA
2	Lin Zhiai; Ma Linqin; Pei Jiayun; He Yanwen; Liu Xirong; Liang Xiling; Cao Mianying Zhou Shouying	Li Ronghua	China	6:14.99	R
3	Tina Brown; Shannon Day; Betsy McCagg; Mary McCagg; Sarah Gengler; Tracy Rude; Kelley Jones; Diana Olson	Yasmin Farooq	United States	6:15.52	R
4	Lenka Zavadilová; Eliška Jandová; Renata Beránková; Martina Šefčíková; Sabina Telenská; Michaela Vávrová; Hana Žáková; Hana Dariusová	Lenka Kováčová	Czechoslovakia	6:31.54	R

==== Heat 2 ====
Rank	Rowers	Coxswain	Nation	Time	Notes
1	Sylvia Dördelmann; Kathrin Haacker; Christiane Harzendorf; Cerstin Petersmann; Dana Pyritz; Annegret Strauch; Ute Schell; Judith Zeidler	Daniela Neunast	Germany	6:11.70	QA
2	Svitlana Fil; Marina Znak; Irina Gribko; Sarmīte Stone; Marina Suprun; Nataliya Stasyuk; Nataliya Grigoryeva; Yekaterina Kotko	Yelena Medvedeva	Unified Team	6:15.04	R
3	Viorica Neculai; Adriana Bazon; Maria Păduraru; Iulia Bulie; Doina Robu; Victoria Lepădatu; Doina Șnep-Bălan; Ioana Olteanu	Elena Georgescu	Romania	6:16.74	R
4	Fiona Freckleton; Philippa Cross; Dot Blackie; Susan Smith; Kate Grose; Rachel Hirst; Kareen Marwick; Katharine Brownlow	Alison Paterson	Great Britain	6:31.63	R

=== Repechage ===
Rank	Rowers	Coxswain	Nation	Time	Notes
1	Viorica Neculai; Adriana Bazon; Maria Păduraru; Iulia Bulie; Doina Robu; Victoria Lepădatu; Doina Șnep-Bălan; Ioana Olteanu	Elena Georgescu	Romania	6:10.98	QA
2	Lin Zhiai; Ma Linqin; Pei Jiayun; He Yanwen; Liu Xirong; Liang Xiling; Cao Mianying Zhou Shouying	Li Ronghua	China	6:13.80	QA
3	Tina Brown; Shannon Day; Betsy McCagg; Mary McCagg; Sarah Gengler; Tracy Rude; Kelley Jones; Diana Olson	Yasmin Farooq	United States	6:13.83	QA
4	Svitlana Fil; Marina Znak; Irina Gribko; Sarmīte Stone; Marina Suprun; Nataliya Stasyuk; Nataliya Grigoryeva; Yekaterina Kotko	Yelena Medvedeva	Unified Team	6:14.97	QA
5	Fiona Freckleton; Philippa Cross; Dot Blackie; Susan Smith; Kate Grose; Rachel Hirst; Kareen Marwick; Katharine Brownlow	Alison Paterson	Great Britain	6:18.99	QB
6	Lenka Zavadilová; Eliška Jandová; Renata Beránková; Martina Šefčíková; Sabina Telenská; Michaela Vávrová; Hana Žáková; Hana Dariusová	Lenka Kováčová	Czechoslovakia	6:22.59	QB

=== Finals ===
==== Final B ====
Rank	Rowers	Coxswain	Nation	Time
7	Fiona Freckleton; Philippa Cross; Dot Blackie; Susan Smith; Kate Grose; Rachel Hirst; Kareen Marwick; Katharine Brownlow	Alison Paterson	Great Britain	6:29.68
8	Lenka Zavadilová; Eliška Jandová; Renata Beránková; Martina Šefčíková; Sabina Telenská; Michaela Vávrová; Hana Žáková; Hana Dariusová	Lenka Kováčová	Czechoslovakia	6:31.12

==== Final A ====
Rank	Rowers	Coxswain	Nation	Time
1st place, gold medalist(s)	Kirsten Barnes; Shannon Crawford; Megan Delehanty; Kathleen Heddle; Marnie McBean; Jessica Monroe; Brenda Taylor; Kay Worthington	Lesley Thompson	Canada	6:02.62
2nd place, silver medalist(s)	Viorica Neculai; Adriana Bazon; Maria Păduraru; Iulia Bulie; Doina Robu; Victoria Lepădatu; Doina Șnep-Bălan; Ioana Olteanu	Elena Georgescu	Romania	6:06.26
3rd place, bronze medalist(s)	Sylvia Dördelmann; Kathrin Haacker; Christiane Harzendorf; Cerstin Petersmann; Dana Pyritz; Annegret Strauch; Ute Schell; Judith Zeidler	Daniela Neunast	Germany	6:07.80
4	Svitlana Fil; Marina Znak; Irina Gribko; Sarmīte Stone; Marina Suprun; Nataliya Stasyuk; Nataliya Grigoryeva; Yekaterina Kotko	Yelena Medvedeva	Unified Team	6:09.68
5	Lin Zhiai; Ma Linqin; Pei Jiayun; He Yanwen; Liu Xirong; Liang Xiling; Cao Mianying Zhou Shouying	Li Ronghua	China	6:12.08
6	Tina Brown; Shannon Day; Betsy McCagg; Mary McCagg; Sarah Gengler; Tracy Rude; Kelley Jones; Diana Olson	Yasmin Farooq	United States	6:12.25

== Final classification ==
The following rowers took part:

Rank	Rowers	Country
1st place, gold medalist(s)	Kirsten Barnes; Shannon Crawford; Megan Delehanty; Kathleen Heddle; Marnie McBean; Jessica Monroe; Brenda Taylor; Lesley Thompson; Kay Worthington	Canada
2nd place, silver medalist(s)	Viorica Neculai; Adriana Bazon; Maria Păduraru; Iulia Bulie; Doina Robu; Victoria Lepădatu; Doina Șnep-Bălan; Elena Georgescu; Ioana Olteanu	Romania
3rd place, bronze medalist(s)	Sylvia Dördelmann; Kathrin Haacker; Christiane Harzendorf; Daniela Neunast; Cerstin Petersmann; Dana Pyritz; Annegret Strauch; Ute Schell; Judith Zeidler	Germany
	Svitlana Fil; Marina Znak; Irina Gribko; Sarmīte Stone; Marina Suprun; Nataliya Stasyuk; Nataliya Grigoryeva; Yekaterina Kotko; Yelena Medvedeva	Unified Team
	Lin Zhiai; Ma Linqin; Pei Jiayun; He Yanwen; Liu Xirong; Liang Xiling; Cao Mianying; Zhou Shouying; Li Ronghua	China
	Tina Brown; Shannon Day; Betsy McCagg; Mary McCagg; Sarah Gengler; Tracy Rude; Kelley Jones; Diana Olson; Yasmin Farooq	United States
	Fiona Freckleton; Philippa Cross; Dot Blackie; Susan Smith; Kate Grose; Rachel Hirst; Kareen Marwick; Katharine Brownlow; Alison Paterson	Great Britain
	Lenka Zavadilová; Eliška Jandová; Renata Beránková; Martina Šefčíková; Sabina Telenská; Michaela Vávrová; Hana Žáková; Hana Dariusová; Lenka Kováčová	Czechoslovakia
