= Rowing at the 1992 Summer Olympics =

Rowing at the Games of the XXV Olympiad
- Venue: Lake of Banyoles
- Date: 27 July – 2 August 1992
- Competitors: 627 (437 men, 190 women) from 45 nations

At the 1992 Summer Olympics in Barcelona, 14 events in rowing were contested, eight for men and six for women. The events were held at the Lake of Banyoles, situated some 95 kilometres (59 mi) north-east of Barcelona.

== Medal table ==
Rank	Nation	Gold	Silver	Bronze	Total
1	Germany	4	3	3	10
2	Canada	4	0	1	5
3	Romania	2	4	1	7
4	Australia	2	0	0	2
4	Great Britain	2	0	0	2
6	United States	0	2	1	3
7	Italy	0	1	1	2
8	Austria	0	1	0	1
8	Belgium	0	1	0	1
8	Czechoslovakia	0	1	0	1
8	Norway	0	1	0	1
12	Poland	0	0	2	2
12	Slovenia	0	0	2	2
14	China	0	0	1	1
14	Netherlands	0	0	1	1
14	Unified Team	0	0	1	1
Totals (16 entries)		14	14	14	42

=== Men's events ===
Games	Gold	Silver	Bronze
Single sculls	Thomas Lange; Germany	Václav Chalupa; Czechoslovakia	Kajetan Broniewski; Poland
Double sculls	Peter Antonie and Stephen Hawkins; Australia	Arnold Jonke and Christoph Zerbst; Austria	Nico Rienks and Henk-Jan Zwolle; Netherlands
Quadruple sculls	Germany; Andreas Hajek; Michael Steinbach; Stephan Volkert; André Willms	Norway; Kjetil Undset; Per Sætersdal; Lars Bjønness; Rolf Thorsen	Italy; Alessandro Corona; Gianluca Farina; Rossano Galtarossa; Filippo Soffici
Coxless pair	Matthew Pinsent and Steve Redgrave; Great Britain	Colin von Ettingshausen and Peter Hoeltzenbein; Germany	Iztok Čop and Denis Žvegelj; Slovenia
Coxed pair	Great Britain; Garry Herbert (cox); Greg Searle; Jonny Searle	Italy; Giuseppe Di Capua (cox); Carmine Abbagnale; Giuseppe Abbagnale	Romania; Dumitru Răducanu (cox); Dimitrie Popescu; Nicolae Țaga
Coxless four	Australia; Andrew Cooper; Nick Green; Mike McKay; James Tomkins	United States; Jeffrey McLaughlin; William Burden; Thomas Bohrer; Patrick Manning	Slovenia; Milan Janša; Sadik Mujkič; Sašo Mirjanič; Janez Klemenčič
Coxed four	Romania; Iulică Ruican; Viorel Talapan; Dimitrie Popescu; Dumitru Răducanu; Nicolae Țaga	Germany; Ralf Brudel; Uwe Kellner; Thoralf Peters; Karsten Finger; Hendrik Reiher	Poland; Wojciech Jankowski; Maciej Łasicki; Jacek Streich; Tomasz Tomiak; Michał Cieślak
Coxed eight	Canada; Darren Barber; Andrew Crosby; Michael Forgeron; Robert Marland; Terrence Paul; Derek Porter; Michael Rascher; Bruce Robertson; John Wallace	Romania; Iulică Ruican; Viorel Talapan; Vasile Năstase; Gabriel Marin; Dănuț Dobre; Valentin Robu; Vasile Măstăcan; Ioan Vizitiu; Marin Gheorghe	Germany; Roland Baar; Armin Eichholz; Detlef Kirchhoff; Manfred Klein; Bahne Rabe; Frank Richter; Hans Sennewald; Thorsten Streppelhoff; Ansgar Wessling

=== Women's events ===
Games	Gold	Silver	Bronze
Single sculls	Elisabeta Lipă; Romania	Annelies Bredael; Belgium	Silken Laumann; Canada
Double sculls	Kerstin Köppen and Kathrin Boron; Germany	Veronica Cochela and Elisabeta Lipă; Romania	Gu Xiaoli and Lu Huali; China
Quadruple sculls	Germany; Sybille Schmidt; Birgit Peter; Kerstin Müller; Kristina Mundt	Romania; Anişoara Dobre; Doina Ignat; Constanța Burcică; Veronica Cochela	Unified Team; Antonina Zelikovich; Tetiana Ustiuzhanina; Ekaterina Karsten; Yelena Khloptseva
Coxless pair	Kathleen Heddle and Marnie McBean; Canada	Ingeburg Schwerzmann and Stefani Werremeier; Germany	Stephanie Pierson and Anna Seaton; United States
Coxless four	Canada; Kirsten Barnes; Jessica Monroe; Brenda Taylor; Kay Worthington	United States; Shelagh Donohoe; Cynthia Eckert; Carol Feeney; Amy Fuller	Germany; Antje Frank; Annette Hohn; Gabriele Mehl; Birte Siech
Coxed eight	Canada; Kirsten Barnes; Shannon Crawford; Megan Delehanty; Kathleen Heddle; Marnie McBean; Jessica Monroe; Brenda Taylor; Lesley Thompson (cox); Kay Worthington	Romania; Viorica Neculai; Adriana Bazon; Maria Păduraru; Iulia Bulie; Doina Robu; Victoria Lepădatu; Doina Șnep-Bălan; Elena Georgescu (cox); Ioana Olteanu	Germany; Sylvia Dördelmann; Kathrin Haacker; Christiane Harzendorf; Daniela Neunast (cox); Cerstin Petersmann; Dana Pyritz; Annegret Strauch; Ute Wagner; Judith Zeidler

== Participating nations ==
- Argentina (6)
- Australia (28)
- Austria (12)
- Belgium (9)
- Brazil (8)
- Bulgaria (15)
- Canada (27)
- China (22)
- Croatia (7)
- Cuba (3)
- Czechoslovakia (31)
- Denmark (13)
- Estonia (7)
- Finland (3)
- France (25)
- Germany (53)
- Great Britain (46)
- Greece (2)
- Hong Kong (3)
- Hungary (8)
- Independent Olympic Participants (2)
- Ireland (1)
- Italy (21)
- Japan (13)
- Latvia (3)
- Lebanon (1)
- Lithuania (8)
- Mexico (5)
- New Zealand (12)
- Netherlands (20)
- Norway (6)
- Poland (15)
- Portugal (2)
- Romania (32)
- Slovenia (6)
- South Africa (9)
- South Korea (2)
- Spain (22)
- Sweden (7)
- Switzerland (9)
- Turkey (1)
- Unified Team (47)
- United States (52)
- Uruguay (1)
- Zimbabwe (2)

== See also ==
- Rowers at the 1992 Summer Olympics
