= Canada at the Olympics =

- IOC code: CAN
- NOC: Canadian Olympic Committee
- Website: www.olympic.ca (in English and French)
- Medals Ranked 16th: Gold 161 Silver 196 Bronze 240 Total 597

Summer appearances
- ~~1900~~; 1904; 1908; 1912; 1920; 1924; 1928; 1932; 1936; 1948; 1952; 1956; 1960; 1964; 1968; 1972; 1976; 1980; 1984; 1988; 1992; 1996; 2000; 2004; 2008; 2012; 2016; 2020; 2024; 2028

Winter appearances
- 1924; 1928; 1932; 1936; 1948; 1952; 1956; 1960; 1964; 1968; 1972; 1976; 1980; 1984; 1988; 1992; 1994; 1998; 2002; 2006; 2010; 2014; 2018; 2022; 2026

Other related appearances
- 1906 Intercalated Games

Canada has sent athletes to every Winter Olympic Games and every Summer Olympic Games since its debut at the 1900 games with the exception of the 1980 Summer Olympics, which it boycotted along with the US and other countries. Canada has won at least one medal at every Olympics in which it has competed. The Canadian Olympic Committee (COC) is the National Olympic Committee for Canada.

At the 2010 Winter Olympics, Canada would win more gold medals than any other competing nation for the first time. Canada also served as the host nation of the 2010 Winter Olympics, with the games taking place in Vancouver, British Columbia.

== Hosted Games ==
Canadian host cities of the Olympic Games

Canada has hosted the winter Olympic games twice, the 1988 Winter Olympics in Calgary, and the 2010 Winter Olympics in Vancouver.

Games	Host city	Dates	Nations	Participants	Events
1976 Summer Olympics	Montreal, Quebec	17 July – 1 August	92	6,028	198
1988 Winter Olympics	Calgary, Alberta	13 – 28 February	57	1,423	46
2010 Winter Olympics	Vancouver, British Columbia	12 – 28 February	82	2,629	86

=== Unsuccessful bids ===
Games	City	Winner of bid
1956 Winter Olympics	Montréal	Cortina d'Ampezzo, Italy
1956 Summer Olympics	Montréal	Melbourne, Australia
1964 Winter Olympics	Calgary	Innsbruck, Austria
1968 Winter Olympics	Calgary	Grenoble, France
1972 Winter Olympics	Calgary	Sapporo, Japan
1972 Summer Olympics	Montréal	Munich, West Germany
1976 Winter Olympics	Vancouver	Innsbruck, Austria
1996 Summer Olympics	Toronto	Atlanta, United States
2002 Winter Olympics	Québec City	Salt Lake City, United States
2008 Summer Olympics	Toronto	Beijing, China
2030 Winter Olympics	Vancouver	Nice and French Alps, France

== Medal tables ==
=== Medals by Summer Games ===
Host country

Games	Athletes	Gold	Silver	Bronze	Total	Gold medal	Total medal
(French Third Republic) 1900 Paris	did not participate						
(United States) 1904 St. Louis	52	4	1	1	6	3	3
(United Kingdom) 1908 London	87	3	3	10	16	7	5
(Sweden) 1912 Stockholm	37	3	2	3	8	9	9
(Belgium) 1920 Antwerp	53	3	3	3	9	12	13
(French Third Republic) 1924 Paris	65	0	3	1	4	20	18
(Netherlands) 1928 Amsterdam	69	4	4	7	15	10	10
(United States) 1932 Los Angeles	102	2	5	8	15	13	10
(Nazi Germany) 1936 Berlin	97	1	3	5	9	17	14
(United Kingdom) 1948 London	118	0	1	2	3	25	22
(Finland) 1952 Helsinki	107	1	2	0	3	21	25
(Australia) 1956 Melbourne	92	2	1	3	6	15	15
(Italy) 1960 Rome	85	0	1	0	1	32	34
(Japan) 1964 Tokyo	115	1	2	1	4	22	21
1968 Mexico City	138	1	3	1	5	23	21
(West Germany) 1972 Munich	208	0	2	3	5	27	22
(Canada) 1976 Montreal	385	0	5	6	11	27	13
(Soviet Union) 1980 Moscow	boycotted						
(United States) 1984 Los Angeles	408	10	18	16	44	6	4
(South Korea) 1988 Seoul	328	3	2	5	10	19	19
(Spain) 1992 Barcelona	295	7	4	7	18	11	15
(United States) 1996 Atlanta	303	3	11	8	22	21	11
(Australia) 2000 Sydney	294	3	3	8	14	24	24
(Greece) 2004 Athens	262	3	6	3	12	21	19
(China) 2008 Beijing	332	3	9	8	20	20	13
(United Kingdom) 2012 London	273	2	6	10	18	27	15
(Brazil) 2016 Rio de Janeiro	314	4	3	15	22	20	10
(Japan) 2020 Tokyo	381	7	7	10	24	11	11
(France) 2024 Paris	315	9	7	11	27	12	11
(United States) 2028 Los Angeles	future event						
(Australia) 2032 Brisbane	future event						
Total (27/30)		79	117	155	351	19	15

Notes

- ^{ART} Art competitions (1912–1948) are not included in the medal table above, as they were non-sports events formerly part of the Olympic Games. (Note: In 1952, art competition medals, as well as the gold medal awards for feats in alpinism and aeronautics, were removed from the official national medal counts. Only since 2021 have they been officially listed again by the IOC in the medal tables and respective National Olympic Committee (NOC) profiles on its website.) Canada won a total of two art competition medals (1 silver, and 1 bronze), across the 1932, and 1948 Summer Olympics.
- ^{NAT} Athletes at the early Olympic Games (1896, 1900, and 1904) are attributed by the International Olympic Committee (IOC) according to the national affiliation of their club/team rather than their nationality. (Note: In 2024, the IOC reinstated its original and current attribution policy for athletes at the early Olympic Games (1896, 1900, and 1904). From 2021 to 2024, the IOC briefly attributed medals in individual events according to the athlete's nationality, even when the athlete represented a foreign club/team. Since 2024, participation and medals have instead been attributed according to the national affiliation of the club/team represented by the athlete.) Canadian George Orton competed at the 1900 Summer Olympics, winning a gold medal and a bronze medal in athletics. As he represented the American University of Pennsylvania, his results are attributed to the United States.

Canada also won 1 gold medal and 1 silver medal at the 1906 Intercalated Games, which the IOC no longer recognizes as an official Olympic games, so these medals are not counted in this table.

=== Medals by Winter Games ===
Host country

Games	Athletes	Gold	Silver	Bronze	Total	Gold medal	Total medal
(France) 1924 Chamonix	12	1	0	0	1	8	9
(Switzerland) 1928 St. Moritz	23	1	0	0	1	5	6
(United States) 1932 Lake Placid	42	1	1	5	7	4	3
(Nazi Germany) 1936 Garmisch-Partenkirchen	29	0	1	0	1	9	9
(Switzerland) 1948 St. Moritz	28	2	0	1	3	6	8
(Norway) 1952 Oslo	39	1	0	1	2	6	8
(Italy) 1956 Cortina d'Ampezzo	37	0	1	2	3	10	9
(United States) 1960 Squaw Valley	44	2	1	1	4	7	8
(Austria) 1964 Innsbruck	55	1	1	1	3	9	10
(France) 1968 Grenoble	70	1	1	1	3	13	14
(Japan) 1972 Sapporo	47	0	1	0	1	17	17
(Austria) 1976 Innsbruck	59	1	1	1	3	11	11
(United States) 1980 Lake Placid	59	0	1	1	2	14	13
(Socialist Federal Republic of Yugoslavia) 1984 Sarajevo	67	2	1	1	4	8	8
(Canada) 1988 Calgary	112	0	2	3	5	13	12
(France) 1992 Albertville	108	2	3	2	7	9	9
(Norway) 1994 Lillehammer	95	3	6	4	13	7	6
(Japan) 1998 Nagano	144	6	5	4	15	4	5
(United States) 2002 Salt Lake City	150	7	3	7	17	4	4
(Italy) 2006 Turin	191	7	10	7	24	5	3
(Canada) 2010 Vancouver	201	14	7	5	26	1	3
(Russia) 2014 Sochi	217	10	10	5	25	3	4
(South Korea) 2018 Pyeongchang	225	11	8	10	29	3	3
(China) 2022 Beijing	215	4	8	14	26	11	4
(Italy) 2026 Milano Cortina	205	5	7	9	21	11	8
(France) 2030 French Alps	future event						
(United States) 2034 Utah	future event						
Total (25/25)		82	79	85	246	4	5

=== Medals by summer sport ===
Leading in that sport

Sport	Gold	Silver	Bronze	Total
Athletics	18	19	32	69
Swimming	12	20	30	62
Rowing	10	18	16	44
Canoeing and kayaking (sprint)	5	11	12	28
Shooting	4	3	2	9
Boxing	3	7	8	18
Freestyle wrestling	3	7	7	17
Artistic swimming	3	4	1	8
Trampoline gymnastics	2	3	3	8
Weightlifting	2	3	1	6
Track cycling	2	2	6	10
Equestrian (jumping)	2	2	1	5
Football	2	0	2	4
Lacrosse	2	0	1	3
Diving	1	5	9	15
Judo	1	2	5	8
Triathlon	1	1	0	2
Tennis	1	0	1	2
Artistic gymnastics	1	0	0	1
Breaking	1	0	0	1
Golf	1	0	0	1
Rhythmic gymnastics	1	0	0	1
Sailing	0	3	6	9
Mountain biking	0	2	1	3
Road cycling	0	1	2	3
Taekwondo	0	1	2	3
Beach volleyball	0	1	1	2
Rugby sevens	0	1	1	2
Basketball	0	1	0	1
Equestrian (dressage)	0	0	1	1
Equestrian (eventing)	0	0	1	1
Fencing	0	0	1	1
Marathon swimming	0	0	1	1
Softball	0	0	1	1
Totals (34 entries)	78	117	155	350

*One of Canada's ice hockey gold medals was won during the 1920 Summer Olympics. This table does not include this medal, resulting in the discrepancy between the medals by games and medals by sports tables.

Canada has never won an Olympic medal in the following current or recent summer sports or disciplines: aquatics (water polo), archery, badminton, baseball, basketball (3-on-3), canoeing and kayaking (slalom), cycling (BMX freestyle), cycling (BMX racing), field hockey, handball, karate, modern pentathlon, skateboarding, sport climbing, surfing, table tennis, volleyball (indoor), and wrestling (Greco-Roman).

=== Medals by winter sport ===
Leading in that sport

Sport	Gold	Silver	Bronze	Total
Freestyle skiing	14	13	8	35
Ice hockey	14	8	3	25
Speed skating	11	17	19	47
Short track speed skating	11	15	16	42
Curling	7	3	4	14
Figure skating	6	11	13	30
Snowboarding	5	6	7	18
Bobsleigh	5	2	4	11
Alpine skiing	4	1	7	12
Skeleton	2	1	1	4
Cross-country skiing	2	1	0	3
Biathlon	2	0	1	3
Luge	0	1	1	2
Ski jumping	0	0	1	1
Totals (14 entries)	83	79	85	247

*One of Canada's ice hockey gold medals was won during the 1920 Summer Olympics. This table includes this medal, resulting in the discrepancy between the medals by games and medals by sports tables.

Nordic combined and ski mountaineering are the only current winter sports and disciplines that Canada has never won a medal in.

- Canada has finished with the highest Canadian Winter medals total at the 2018 Winter Olympic Games with 29 medals. This represents Canada's second highest medal haul at the Olympics, behind the 44 of the Soviet-bloc-boycotted 1984 Summer Games.
- Canada has finished the 2010 Winter Olympics at the first place at the medal table, with 14 gold medals.
- Canada was the first nation to win 14 gold medals at a single Winter Games. In 2018, Germany and Norway matched this record. Then in 2022, Norway set a new record with 16.

== Records ==
In 2012, Equestrian show jumper Ian Millar competed at his tenth Summer Olympics, tying the record for most Olympic games participated in set by Austrian sailor Hubert Raudaschl between 1964 and 1996. He has been named to eleven straight Olympic teams, but did not compete at the 1980 Summer Olympics due to the Canadian boycott. In 2008 he won his first medal, a silver medal in the team jumping event.

Clara Hughes is the inaugural and only Olympian of any country or gender, to win medals all Olympic Games: two Summer and four Winter medals. Cindy Klassen and Charles Hamelin hold the record for most Winter medals won by a Canadian, with six apiece. Penny Oleksiak and Andre De Grasse are the most decorated Canadian athletes to ever compete at the Summer Games, each winning 7 medals.

Catriona Le May Doan became the inaugural Canadian to defend their gold medal at the Olympics. She repeated her gold medal in the women's 500m long track speedskating event at the 2002 Salt Lake City Olympics from the 1998 Nagano Olympics.

Alexandre Bilodeau became the first freestyle skiing gold medallist to defend his Olympic title, and first repeat gold medallist, winning the men's moguls at the 2014 Sochi Winter Olympics. He became the second Canadian to defend their Olympic gold, and first man.

Trampoline gymnast Rosie MacLennan was the first Canadian to defend their gold medal in an individual sport at the Summer Olympics. She won gold at the 2012 and 2016 Summer Olympics, the inaugural Olympian to defend their title in that discipline.

After captaining the women's ice hockey team to gold at the 2014 Winter Olympics, Caroline Ouellette became the first Winter Olympian of any country or gender to enter four or more career events and win gold in each. Oullette had previously won gold in ice hockey in 2002, 2006, and 2010.

Jennifer Jones skipped the Canadian women's team at the 2014 Winter Olympics to a gold medal. She is the first ever female skip in Olympic history to be undefeated throughout the tournament. Jones, Kaitlyn Lawes, Jill Officer, Dawn McEwen and spare Kirsten Wall went unbeaten with an 11–0 record defeating China, Sweden (round-robin and finals), Great Britain (round-robin and semi-finals), Denmark, Switzerland, Japan, Russia, the United States, and Korea.

During the 2016 Summer Olympics, swimmer Penny Oleksiak became the inaugural Canadian of either gender to win four medals at a single Summer Games and the distinction of the country's youngest Olympic multiple medalist at the age of 16: a gold in the 100 m freestyle, a silver in the 100 m butterfly, and two bronzes in the women's freestyle relays (4 × 100 m and 4 × 200 m). She shares the distinction of being the co-inaugural Olympic medalist born in the 21st century when, in women's 4 × 100 m freestyle relay a few days earlier, she won the bronze medal with teammate Taylor Ruck.

After capturing gold in 2010 Winter Olympics, Tessa Virtue and Scott Moir became the inaugural ice dancers from North America to win an Olympic gold medal, ending the 34-year streak of the Europeans. They were the inaugural ice dance team to win the Olympic gold at home ice and the inaugural ice dancers to win gold at their Olympic debut. They are the youngest pair to win an Olympic title at 20 and 22 respectively. They would win two more silver medals at the 2014 Winter Olympics and two more gold medals at the 2018 Winter Olympics, giving them the distinction of being the most decorated figure skaters at the Winter Games.

Broadcaster Richard Garneau covered 23 Olympic Games, more than any other journalist in the world, starting with Rome in 1960 to London in 2012, missing only the Atlanta and Nagano Games. The International Olympic Committee awarded him posthumously the Pierre de Coubertin Medal in recognition of his exceptional service to the Olympic movement.

=== Top medal earners ===
- Years in **bolded text** are Olympics at which that competitor won a medal.

Athlete	Sport	Type	Olympics	Gold	Silver	Bronze	Total
Andre De Grasse	Athletics	Summer	**2016**, **2020**, **2024**	2	2	3	7
Penny Oleksiak	Swimming	Summer	**2016**, **2020**, 2024	1	2	4	7
Charles Hamelin	Short track	Winter	**2006**, **2010**, **2014**, **2018**, **2022**	4	1	1	6
Cindy Klassen	Speed skating	Winter	**2002**, **2006**, 2010	1	2	3	6
Clara Hughes	Cycling	Summer	**1996**, 2000, 2012	0	0	2	6
Clara Hughes	Speed skating	Winter	**2002**, **2006**, **2010**	1	1	2	6
Kim Boutin	Short track	Winter	**2018**, **2022**, **2026**	0	2	4	6
Jayna Hefford	Ice hockey	Winter	**1998**, **2002**, **2006**, **2010**, **2014**	4	1	0	5
Hayley Wickenheiser	Ice hockey	Winter	**1998**, **2002**, **2006**, **2010**, **2014**	4	1	0	5
Scott Moir	Figure skating	Winter	**2010**, **2014**, **2018**	3	2	0	5
Tessa Virtue	Figure skating	Winter	**2010**, **2014**, **2018**	3	2	0	5
Marie-Philip Poulin	Ice hockey	Winter	**2010**, **2014**, **2018**, **2022**, **2026**	3	2	0	5
Marc Gagnon	Short track	Winter	**1994**, **1998**, **2002**	3	0	2	5
Mikaël Kingsbury	Freestyle skiing	Winter	**2014**, **2018**, **2022**, **2026**	2	3	0	5
Steven Dubois	Short track	Winter	**2022**, **2026**	2	2	1	5
François-Louis Tremblay	Short track	Winter	**2002**, **2006**, **2010**	2	2	1	5
Valérie Maltais	Short track	Winter	**2014**, 2018	0	1	0	5
Valérie Maltais	Speed skating	Winter	**2022**, **2026**	2	0	2	5
Lesley Thompson	Rowing	Summer	**1984**, 1988, **1992**, **1996**, **2000**, 2008, **2012**, 2016	1	3	1	5
Kylie Masse	Swimming	Summer	**2016**, **2020**, **2024**	0	2	3	5
Phil Edwards	Athletics	Summer	**1928**, **1932**, **1936**	0	0	5	5
Caroline Ouellette	Ice hockey	Winter	**2002**, **2006**, **2010**, **2014**	4	0	0	4
Meghan Agosta	Ice hockey	Winter	**2006**, **2010**, **2014**, **2018**	3	1	0	4
Jennifer Botterill	Ice hockey	Winter	**1998**, **2002**, **2006**, **2010**	3	1	0	4
Becky Kellar	Ice hockey	Winter	**1998**, **2002**, **2006**, **2010**	3	1	0	4
Rebecca Johnston	Ice hockey	Winter	**2010**, **2014**, **2018**, **2022**	3	1	0	4
Summer McIntosh	Swimming	Summer	2020, **2024**	3	1	0	4
Kathleen Heddle	Rowing	Summer	**1992**, **1996**	3	0	1	4
Marnie McBean	Rowing	Summer	**1992**, **1996**	3	0	1	4
Brianne Jenner	Ice hockey	Winter	**2014**, **2018**, **2022**, **2026**	2	2	0	4
Jocelyne Larocque	Ice hockey	Winter	**2014**, **2018**, **2022**, **2026**	2	2	0	4
Natalie Spooner	Ice hockey	Winter	**2014**, **2018**, **2022**, **2026**	2	2	0	4
Ivanie Blondin	Speed skating	Winter	2018, **2022**, **2026**	2	2	0	4
Éric Bédard	Short track	Winter	**1998**, **2002**, **2006**	2	1	1	4
Gaétan Boucher	Speed skating	Winter	1976, **1980**, **1984**, 1988	2	1	1	4
Isabelle Weidemann	Speed skating	Winter	2018, **2022**, **2026**	2	1	1	4
Victor Davis	Swimming	Summer	**1984**, **1988**	1	3	0	4
Denny Morrison	Speed skating	Winter	**2006**, **2010**, **2014**, 2018	1	2	1	4
Adam van Koeverden	Kayaking	Summer	**2004**, **2008**, **2012**, 2016	1	2	1	4
Kristina Groves	Speed skating	Winter	2002, **2006**, **2010**	0	3	1	4
Tania Vicent	Short track	Winter	**1998**, **2002**, **2006**, **2010**	0	2	2	4
Émilie Heymans	Diving	Summer	**2000**, **2004**, **2008**, **2012**	0	2	2	4
Courtney Sarault	Short track	Winter	2022, **2026**	0	2	2	4
Taylor Ruck	Swimming	Summer	**2016**, **2020**, 2024	0	1	3	4
Alex Wilson	Athletics	Summer	**1928**, **1932**	0	1	3	4

=== 3+ medals at one Olympics ===
Athlete	Sport	Olympics	Gold	Silver	Bronze	Total
Phil Edwards	Athletics	1932 Summer	0	0	800 m 1500 m 4×400 m relay	3
Alex Wilson	Athletics	1932 Summer	0	800 m	400 m 4×400 m relay	3
Elaine Tanner	Swimming	1968 Summer	0	100 m backstroke 200 m backstroke	4×100m freestyle	3
Victor Davis	Swimming	1984 Summer	200 m breaststroke	100 m breaststroke 4×100 m medley	0	3
Anne Ottenbrite	Swimming	1984 Summer	200 m breaststroke	100 m breaststroke	4×100 m medley	3
Gaétan Boucher	Speed skating	1984 Winter	1000 m 1500 m	0	500 m	3
Marc Gagnon	Short track	2002 Winter	500 m 5000 m relay	0	1500 m	3
Cindy Klassen	Speed skating	2006 Winter	1500 m	1000 m Team pursuit	3000 m 5000 m	5
Penny Oleksiak	Swimming	2016 Summer	100 m freestyle	100 m butterfly	4×100 m freestyle 4×200 m freestyle	4
Andre De Grasse	Athletics	2016 Summer	0	200 m	100 m 4×100 m relay	3
Kim Boutin	Short track	2018 Winter	0	1000 m	500 m 1500 m	3
Maggie MacNeil	Swimming	2020 Summer	100 m butterfly	4x100 m freestyle	4×100 m medley	3
Kylie Masse	Swimming	2020 Summer	0	100 m backstroke 200 m backstroke	4×100 m medley	3
Penny Oleksiak	Swimming	2020 Summer	0	4x100 m freestyle	200 m freestyle 4×100 m medley	3
Andre De Grasse	Athletics	2020 Summer	200 m	4×100 m relay	100 m	3
Steven Dubois	Short track	2022 Winter	5000 m relay	1500 m	500 m	3
Isabelle Weidemann	Speed skating	2022 Winter	Team Pursuit	5000 m	3000 m	3
Summer McIntosh	Swimming	2024 Summer	200 m medley 400 m medley 200 m butterfly	400 m freestyle	0	4
Courtney Sarault	Short track	2026 Winter	0	1000 m 2000 m mixed relay	500 m 3000 m relay	4
Valérie Maltais	Speed skating	2026 Winter	Team Pursuit	0	1500 m 3000 m	3

=== Multiple gold medals at one Olympics ===
Athlete	Sport	Olympics	Golds	Total
George Hodgson	Swimming	1912 Summer	400 m freestyle 1500 m freestyle	2
Percy Williams	Athletics	1928 Summer	100 m 200 m	2
Gaétan Boucher	Speed skating	1984 Winter	1000 m 1500 m	2
Alex Baumann	Swimming	1984 Summer	200 m medley 400 m medley	2
Carolyn Waldo	Synchronized swimming	1988 Summer	Solo; Duet	2
Kathleen Heddle; Marnie McBean	Rowing	1992 Summer	Coxless pair Eight	2
Kirsten Barnes; Jessica Monroe; Brenda Taylor; Kay Worthington	Rowing	1992 Summer	Coxless four Eight	2
Myriam Bédard	Biathlon	1994 Winter	Sprint; 15 km	2
Donovan Bailey	Athletics	1996 Summer	100 m 4 × 100 m relay	2
Marc Gagnon	Short track	2002 Winter	500 m 5000 m relay	2
Charles Hamelin	Short track	2010 Winter	500 m 5000 m relay	2
Scott Moir; Tessa Virtue	Figure skating	2018 Winter	Ice dance Team	2
Summer McIntosh	Swimming	2024 Summer	200 m medley 400 m medley 200 m butterfly	3

== See also ==
- List of flag bearers for Canada at the Olympics
- List of Canadian Summer Olympics gold medalists
- List of Olympic men's ice hockey players for Canada
- List of Olympic women's ice hockey players for Canada
- Canadian Olympic stamps
- Own the Podium
- Canada at the Paralympics
