= Gabriele Mehl =

German rower

Medal record

Women's rowing

Representing West Germany

World Rowing Championships
Silver medal – second place	1990 Tasmania	W4-

Representing Germany

Olympic Games
Bronze medal – third place	1992 Barcelona	Coxless fours

World Rowing Championships
Bronze medal – third place	1991 Vienna	W4-

Gabriele Mehl (born 25 February 1967, in Hagenbach) is a former German rower. She won a bronze medal at the Olympic Games in 1992.

== Career ==
Mehl was Member of the rowing club "am Baldeneysee" in Essen, Germany. In 1987 and 1988 she and Meike Holländer formed a coxless pair team at the German Championship and scored second. At the World Championship in 1987 the team started as part of an Eight and scored fifth.

In 1990, Mehl and Holländer participated as a coxless four team with Cerstin Petersmann and Sylvia Drödelmann. After their victory at the German Championships they scored second at the World Championships in Tasmania. After the German reunification in 1990 the rowing clubs of western and eastern Germany united. As a newly formed coxless four team, Gabriele Mehl, Cerstin Petersmann, Judith Zeidler and Kathrin Haaker won the German Championship and scored third at the World Championship.

In 1992, Gabriele Mehl was member of a coxless four with Antje Frank, Birte Siech and Annette Hohn at the Olympic Games 1992. They scored third, arriving after both the Canadian and the American team.
