= Rachel Hirst =

British rower

Personal information
- Full name: Rachel Clare Hirst
- Nationality: British
- Born: 4 March 1965 (age 60); Cheltenham, England

Sport
- Sport: Rowing
- Club: Trent Polytechnic; Nottinghamshire County RA

Rachel Clare Hirst married name Rachel Stanhope (born 4 March 1965) is a former British rower who won a silver medal at the 1989 World Rowing Championships in Bled, in the lightweight coxless four event and competed at the 1992 Summer Olympics.

== Early life ==
She grew up in Flaxton, North Yorkshire.

== Rowing career ==
She won the single sculls title rowing for Trent Polytechnic, at the 1986 National Championships and the following year she repeated the success but this time rowing for the Nottinghamshire County Rowing Association. In 1989 she won the coxed four and lightweight coxless four national titles at the 1989 National Championships. and won a silver medal at the 1989 World Rowing Championships in Bled.

She was selected to represent Great Britain in the women's eight event at the 1992 Olympic Games in Barcelona. The team which consisted of Hirst, Fiona Freckleton, Philippa Cross, Dot Blackie, Susan Smith, Kate Grose, Kareen Marwick, Katharine Brownlow and Alison Paterson finished in seventh place.

== Personal life ==
She lived in West Bridgford. She married rower Richard Stanhope on Saturday 17 October 1992 at St Lawrence's Church, Flaxton.
