= Kareen Marwick =

British rower

Personal information
- Full name: Kareen Elizabeth Marwick
- Nationality: British
- Born: 14 May 1961 (age 64); Kirkwall, Scotland

Sport
- Sport: Rowing
- Club: Tideway Scullers School; NCRA

Kareen Elizabeth Marwick married name Kareen Larkin (born 14 May 1961) is a former British rower who competed at the 1992 Summer Olympics.

== Rowing career ==
Marwick was part of the coxless fours crew, with Tessa Millar, Katie Ball, Kate McNicol and Sue Bailey, that won the national title rowing for the A.R.A Squad, at the 1983 National Rowing Championships.

She was part of the coxless fours with Kate Grose, Miriam Batten and Caroline Christie that won the national title rowing for the British squad at the 1990 National Championships. In 1992 she was selected to represent Great Britain in the women's eight event at the 1992 Olympic Games in Barcelona. The crew which consisted of Marwick, Fiona Freckleton, Philippa Cross, Dot Blackie, Susan Smith, Kate Grose, Rachel Hirst, Katharine Brownlow and Alison Paterson finished in seventh place.

== Personal life ==
Kareen was educated at Cambridge University and married fellow rower and rowing coach Simon Larkin in 1996. She is a part time General practitioner.
