= Kate Grose =

British rower

Personal information
- Born: 7 February 1959 (age 67) Haverhill, England

Sport
- Sport: Rowing
- Club: Trinity Hall BC; Cambridge University WBC; Thames RC; Tideway Scullers School; Norwich Scullers
Medal record
Rowing
Representing England
Commonwealth Games
Silver medal – second place	1986 Edinburgh	eight

Katherine L.F. Grose (born 7 February 1959) is a British retired rower, who competed at the 1988 Summer Olympics and the 1992 Summer Olympics.

== Rowing career ==
Grose took up rowing while at Cambridge University in 1978. Six years later she was in the women's boat race rowing for the blue boat when studying for a post graduate architecture diploma and was part of the Cambridge boat that won the eight at the 1984 National Championships.

She represented England and won a silver medal in the eight, at the 1986 Commonwealth Games in Edinburgh and competed in the 1986 World Rowing Championships.

The following year she was a member of the eight that won the national title rowing for a A.R.A squad at the 1987 National Championships and rowed in her second World Championships in Copenhagen. She was selected to represent Great Britain in the women's coxed four event at the 1988 Olympic Games in Seoul. The team which consisted of Grose, Joanne Gough, Fiona Johnston, Susan Smith and Alison Norrish finished in sixth place.

Grose competed in both the 1989 and 1990 World Championships and was part of the coxless fours with Miriam Batten, Kareen Marwick and Caroline Christie that won the national title rowing for the British squad at the 1990 National Championships.

In 1992 she was selected to represent Great Britain in her second Olympics, in the women's eight event at the 1992 Olympic Games in Barcelona. The team which consisted of Grose, Rachel Hirst, Fiona Freckleton, Philippa Cross, Dot Blackie, Susan Smith, Kareen Marwick, Katharine Brownlow and Alison Paterson finished in seventh place.
