= 1991 World Rowing Championships =

International rowing event

- Venue: New Danube
- Location: Vienna, Austria
- Dates: 19–25 August

The 1991 World Rowing Championships were World Rowing Championships that were held from 19 to 25 August 1991 in Vienna, Austria. The regatta was held on the New Danube.

== Medal summary ==
The finals were raced on Saturday and Sunday, 24 and 25 August.

=== Men's events ===
Event:	Gold:	Time	Silver:	Time	Bronze:	Time
M1x	Germany; Thomas Lange	6:41.29	Czechoslovakia; Václav Chalupa	6:45.26	Poland; Kajetan Broniewski	6:48.91
M2x	Netherlands; Nico Rienks; Henk-Jan Zwolle	6:06.14	Soviet Union; Uģis Lasmanis; Leonid Shaposhnikov	6:07.49	Germany; Oliver Grüner; André Steiner	6:08.36
M4x	Soviet Union; Valeriy Dosenko; Sergey Kinyakin; Mykola Chupryna; Ģirts Vilks	6:08.39	Italy; Alessandro Corona; Gianluca Farina; Massimo Paradiso; Filippo Soffici	6:11.21	Netherlands; Rutger Arisz; Koos Maasdijk; Hans Kelderman; Ronald Florijn	6:13.03
M2+	Italy; Carmine Abbagnale; Giuseppe Abbagnale; Giuseppe Di Capua	7:34.39	Poland; Piotr Basta; Tomasz Mruczkowski; Bartosz Sroga	7:35.83	Czechoslovakia; Michal Dalecký; Dušan Macháček; Oldřich Hejdušek	7:38.02
M2-	Great Britain; Steve Redgrave; Matthew Pinsent	6:21.35	Yugoslavia; Iztok Čop; Denis Žvegelj	6:24.18	Austria; Hermann Bauer; Karl Sinzinger Jr	6:24.51
M4+	Germany; Armin Eichholz; Bahne Rabe; Matthias Ungemach; Armin Weyrauch; Jörg Dedering	5:58.96	Romania; Dănuț Dobre; Dragoș Neagu; Valentin Robu; Ioan Snep; Dumitru Răducanu	6:00.29	Poland; Wojciech Jankowski; Maciej Łasicki; Jacek Streich; Tomasz Tomiak; Michał Cieślak	6:01.30
M4-	Australia; Andrew Cooper; Nick Green; Mike McKay; James Tomkins	6:29.69	United States; Thomas Bohrer; Patrick Manning; Jeffrey McLaughlin; Michael Porterfield	6:32.22	Germany; Markus Bräuer; Andreas Lütkefels; Stefan Scholz; Markus Vogt	6:34.43
M8+	Germany; Martin Steffes-Mies; Dirk Balster; Claas-Peter Fischer; Thorsten Streppelhoff; Jürgen Hecht; Wolfgang Klapheck; Ansgar Wessling; Roland Baar; Manfred Klein	5:50.98	Canada; Darren Barber; Andy Crosby; Robert Bob Marland; Derek Porter; Michael Mike Rascher; Bruce Robertson; Don Telfer; John Wallace; Terrence Paul	5:51.68	Great Britain; Martin Cross; Tim Foster; Anton Obholzer; Richard Phelps; Greg Searle; Jonny Searle; Jonny Singfield; Richard Stanhope; Garry Herbert	5:52.74
Men's lightweight events
LM1x	Ireland; Niall O'Toole	6:49.17	Germany; Peter Uhrig	6:49.96	Belgium; Wim Van Belleghem	6:52.26
LM2x	Germany; Michael Buchheit; Kai von Warburg	6:20.04	Austria; Walter Rantasa; Christoph Schmölzer	6:25.29	Netherlands; Jan van Bekkum; Daan Boddeke	6:26.22
LM4x	Australia; Simon Burgess; Gary Lynagh; Bruce Hick; Stephen Hawkins	6:37.02	Sweden; Joakim Brischewski; Bo Ekros; Lars-Johan Flodin; Per Lundberg	6:37.25	France; Roland Gaillac; Patrick Maiore; Laurent Porchier; Thierry Renault	6:38.02
LM4-	Great Britain; Christopher Bates; Toby Hessian; Tom Kay; Carl Smith	5:57.60	Italy; Sabino Bellomo; Franco Cattaneo; Danilo Fraquelli; Alfredo Striani	5:58.61	Spain; Juan Luis Aguierre Barco; Fernando Climent; José María de Marco Pérez; Fernando Molina Castillo	6:00.85
LM8+	Italy; Enrico Barbaranelli; Domenico Cantoni; Carlo Gaddi; Pasquale Marigliano; Fabrizio Ranieri; Fabrizio Ravasi; Andrea Re; Roberto Romanini; Gaetano Iannuzzi	6:13.21	France; Stéphane Barré; Sebastien Bel; Bruno Boucher; Stéphane Guerinot; Laurent Irazusta; Benoit Masson; Antoine Orieux; José Oyarzabal; Philippe Spinelli	6:13.40	United States; Eduardo Montalvo; Tom Hartley; Robert Hermann; Brian Varga; David Collins; Dale Hurley; Tom Auth; James Manson; Michael O'Gorman	6:15.25

=== Women's events ===
Event:	Gold:	Time	Silver:	Time	Bronze:	Time
W1x	Canada; Silken Laumann	8:17.58	Romania; Elisabeta Lipă	8:20.53	Belgium; Annelies Bredael	8:21.96
W2x	Germany; Kathrin Boron; Beate Schramm	6:44.71	Romania; Anișoara Dobre-Bălan; Elisabeta Lipă	6:46.40	Soviet Union; Ekaterina Khadatovich; Sariya Zakyrova	6:47.36
W4x	Germany; Kerstin Köppen; Claudia Krüger; Sybille Schmidt; Jana Sorgers	6:55.85	Soviet Union; Yelena Khloptseva; Mariya Omelianovych; Tetiana Ustiuzhanina; Mira Vaganova	7:00.37	Romania; Constanța Burcică; Anișoara Dobre-Bălan; Doina Ignat; Fanica Costea	7:04.86
W2-	Canada; Kathleen Heddle; Marnie McBean	6:57.42	Germany; Stefani Werremeier; Ingeburg Althoff	6:59.55	Great Britain; Miriam Batten; Fiona Freckleton	7:02.28
W4-	Canada; Kirsten Barnes; Jennifer Doey; Jessica Monroe; Brenda Taylor	6:25.47	United States; Shelagh Donohoe; Cynthia Eckert; Stephanie Maxwell-Pierson; Anna Seaton	6:27.39	Germany; Kathrin Haacker; Gebriele Mehl; Cerstin Petersmann; Judith Ungemach-Zeidler	6:30.30
W8+	Canada; Kirsten Barnes; Megan Delehanty; Jennifer Doey; Kathleen Heddle; Kelly Mahon; Marnie McBean; Jessica Monroe; Brenda Taylor; Lesley Thompson-Willie	6:28.20	Soviet Union; Irina Gribko; Marina Suprun; Nataliya Grigoryeva; Ekaterina Kotko; Olga Smetannikova; Sarmīte Stone; Marina Znak; Elena Medvedeva; Nataliya Stasyuk	6:28.73	Romania; Doina Snep; Adriana Chelariu-Bazon; Iulia Bobeica; Veronica Cochela; Marioara Curela; Viorica Neculai; Maria Padurariu; Doina Ciucanu-Robu; Elena Georgescu	6:34.07
Women's lightweight events
LW1x	New Zealand; Philippa Baker	7:29.99	Netherlands; Laurien Vermulst	7:32.41	Denmark; Mette Bloch Jensen	7:33.17
LW2x	Germany; Claudia Waldi; Christiane Weber	7:58.53	United States; Lindsay Burns; Teresa Zarzeczny	8:00.16	Denmark; Elisabeth Fraas; Ulla Jensen	8:06.32
LW4-	China; Li Fei; Liang Sanmei; Liao Xiaoli; Ou Shaoyan	7:37.06	Great Britain; Alison Brownless; Katharine Brownlow; Anna Marie Dryden; Claire Davies	7:41.15	United States; Christine Collins; Ellen Minzner; Alison Shaw; Kelly Sherman	7:43.99

== Medal table ==
Place	Nation	1st place, gold medalist(s)	2nd place, silver medalist(s)	3rd place, bronze medalist(s)	Total
1	Germany	7	2	3	12
2	Canada	4	1	0	5
3	Italy	2	2	0	4
4	Great Britain	2	1	2	5
5	Australia	2	0	0	2
6	Soviet Union	1	3	1	5
7	Netherlands	1	1	2	4
8	China	1	0	0	1
8	Ireland	1	0	0	1
8	New Zealand	1	0	0	1
11	Romania	0	3	2	5
11	United States	0	3	2	5
13	Poland	0	1	2	3
14	Austria	0	1	1	2
14	France	0	1	1	2
14	Czechoslovakia	0	1	1	2
17	Sweden	0	1	0	1
17	Yugoslavia	0	1	0	1
19	Belgium	0	0	2	2
19	Denmark	0	0	2	2
21	Spain	0	0	1	1
Total		22	22	22	66
