= 1990 World Rowing Championships =

International rowing event

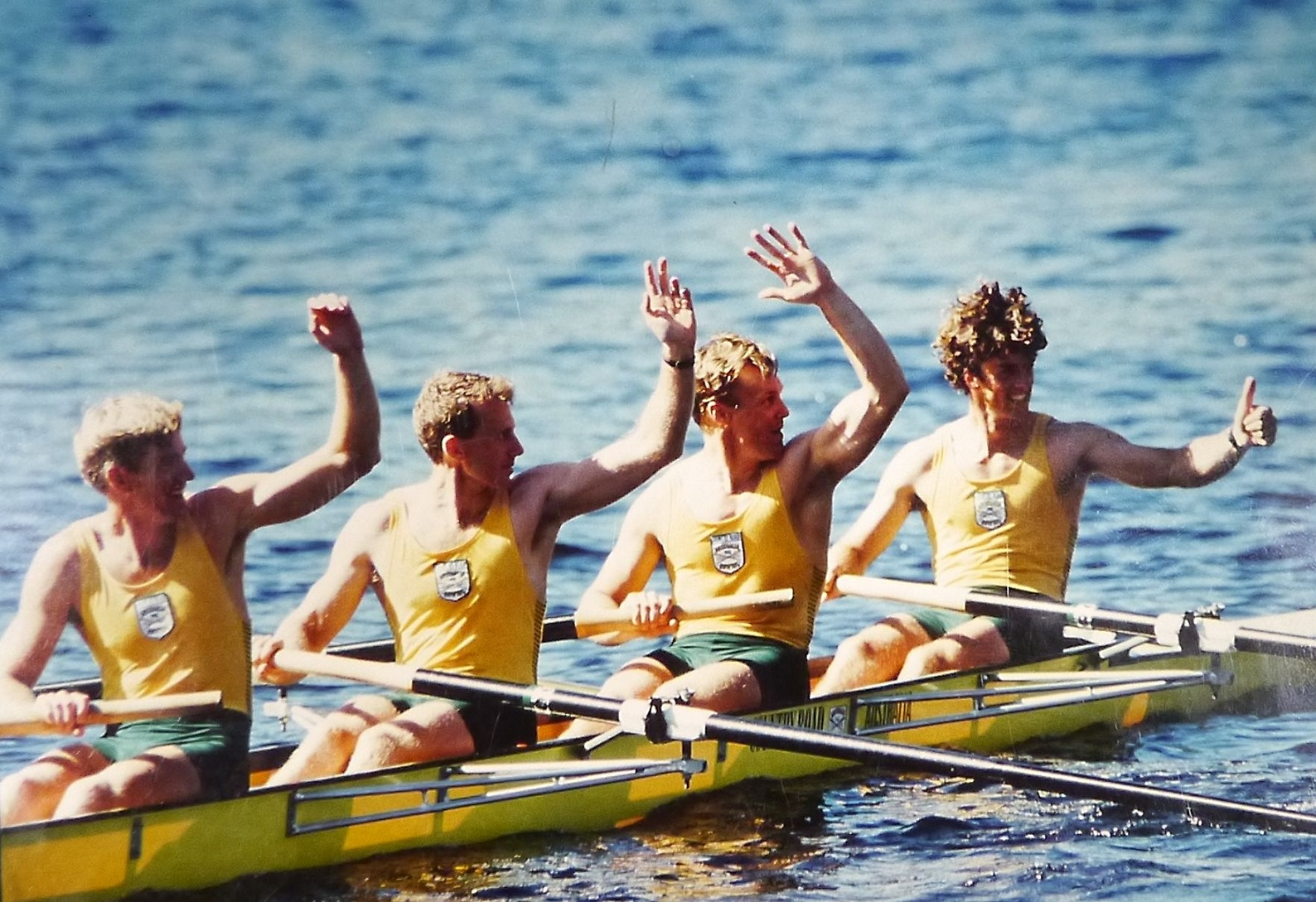
- Australian champion M4-
- Venue: Lake Barrington
- Location: Tasmania, Australia
- Dates: 31 October to 4 November

The 1990 World Rowing Championships were World Rowing Championships that were held from 31 October to 4 November 1990 at Lake Barrington in Tasmania, Australia.

== German teams ==
A month prior to the World Championships, Germany completed the political process of reunification of the eastern and western parts of the country. This was done at great speed, and organisational changes at the sports level took longer, with the German rowing federations due to merge by the end of 1990. FISA confirmed to the East German rowing federation that their rowers could participate as a separate team to West Germany, but without the designation of East Germany (GDR). There were no problems with medal ceremonies, as national anthems were not played nor national flags raised based on a decision made in 1955.

== Medal summary ==
=== Men's events ===
Event:	Gold:	Time	Silver:	Time	Bronze:	Time
M1x	Soviet Union; Jüri Jaanson	7:22.15	Czechoslovakia; Václav Chalupa	7:26.98	New Zealand; Eric Verdonk	7:31.70
M2x	Austria; Arnold Jonke (b); Christoph Zerbst (s)	6:56.37	East Germany; Thomas Lange (b); Stefan Ullrich (s)	6:57.08	Australia; Peter Antonie (b); Paul Reedy (s)	7:04.49
M4x	Soviet Union; Valeriy Dosenko (b); Sergey Kinyakin (2); Mykola Chupryna (3); Ģirts Vilks (s)	5:40.44	Switzerland; Ueli Bodenmann (b); Marc-Sven Nater (2); Alexander Rückstuhl (3); Beat Schwerzmann (s)	5:41.81	Italy; Alessandro Corona (b); Gianluca Farina (2); Massimo Paradiso (3); Filippo Soffici (s)	5:42.18
M2+	Italy; Carmine Abbagnale (b); Giuseppe Abbagnale (s); Giuseppe Di Capua (c)	6:48.30	Spain; José Ignacio Bugarín (b); Ibon Urbieta (s); Gabriel de Marco (c)	6:50.52	Yugoslavia; Milan Janša (b); Robert Krašovec (s); Robert Eržen (c)	6:51.84
M2-	East Germany; Thomas Jung (b); Uwe Kellner (s)	7:07.91	Soviet Union; Nikolay Pimenov (b); Yuriy Pimenov (s)	7:10.20	Great Britain; Matthew Pinsent (b); Steve Redgrave (s)	7:12.38
M4+	East Germany; Bernd Eichwurzel (b); Mario Gruessel (2); Detlef Kirchhoff (3); Stefan Schulz (s); Hendrik Reiher (c)	6:46.73	West Germany; Wolfgang Klapheck (b); Stefan Scholz (2); Ansgar Wessling (3); Volker Zimmermann (s); Thomas Alt (c)	6:48.03	Soviet Union; Igor Bortnitski (b); Sigitas Kučinskas (2); Jonas Narmontas (3); Vladimir Romanishin (s); Petr Petrinitch (c)	6:49.40
M4-	Australia; Nick Green (b); Mike McKay (2); Samuel Patten (3); James Tomkins (s)	5:52.20	Netherlands; Niels van der Zwan (b); Jaap Krijtenburg (2); Bart Peters (3); Sven Schwarz (s)	5:53.41	East Germany; Ralf Brudel (b); Olaf Förster (2); Thomas Greiner (3); Jens Luedecke (s)	5:54.71
M8+	West Germany; Roland Baar (b); Dirk Balster (2); Frank Dietrich (3); Christoph Korte (4); Frank Richter (5); Martin Steffes-Mies (6); Matthias Ungemach (7); Armin Weyrauch (s); Manfred Klein (c)	5:26.62	Canada; Darren Barber (b); Andy Crosby (2); Robert Bob Marland (3); Derek Porter (4); Michael Mike Rascher (5); Bruce Robertson (6); Brian Saunderson (7); John Wallace (s); Terrence Paul (c)	5:27.57	East Germany; Thomas Baensch (b); Andre Hache (2); Frank Pawlowski (3); Michael Peter (4); Roland Schröder (5); Hans Sennewald (6); Thomas Woddow (7); Lutz Thiede (s); Peter Thiede (c)	5:29.88
Men's lightweight events
LM1x	Netherlands; Frans Göbel	7:21.24	Belgium; Wim Van Belleghem	7:22.49	Norway; Per Sætersdal	7:28.80
LM2x	United States; Robert Dreher (b); Stephen Peterson (s)	7:46.15	West Germany; Karsten Krueger (b); Peter Müller (s)	7:46.38	Austria; Walter Rantasa (b); Christoph Schmölzer (s)	7:46.88
LM4x	Italy; Francesco Esposito (b); Massimo Lana (2); Paolo Pittino (3); Massimo Guglielmi (s)	5:46.38	France; Bruno Boucher (b); Bruno Lebeda (2); Laurent Porchier (3); Thierry Renault (s)	5:48.58	Australia; Simon Burgess (b); Bruce Hick (2); Gary Lynagh (3); Stephen Hawkins (s)	5:48.72
LM4-	West Germany; Klaus Altena (b); Michael Buchheit (2); Stephan Fahrig (3); Bernhard Stomporowski (s)	7:03.68	France; Stéphane Guerinot (b); Laurent Irazusta (2); Benoit Masson (3); José Oyarzabal (s)	7:05.57	Netherlands; Frank Gerritse (b); Pim Laken (2); Mark Emke (3); Han de Regt (s)	7:05.84
LM8+	Italy; Enrico Barbaranelli (b); Franco Falossi (2); Carlo Gaddi (3); Fabrizio Ranieri (4); Fabrizio Ravasi (5); Andrea Re (6); Roberto Romanini (7); Alfredo Striani (s); Giuseppe Lamberti (c)	5:35.03	Denmark; Svend Blitskov (b); Peter Madsen (2); Flemming Meyer (3); Vagn Nielsen (4); Henning Bay Nielsen (5); Lars Rasmussen (6); Hans Christian Sørensen (7); Bo Vestergaard (s); Stephen Masters (c)	5:36.98	Great Britain; Christopher Bates (b); Marysh Chmiel (2); Peter Haining (3); Toby Hessian (4); Tom Kay (5); Carl Smith (6); Neil Staite (7); Stephen Wright (s); John Deakin (c)	5:37.75

=== Women's events ===
Event:	Gold:	Time	Silver:	Time	Bronze:	Time
W1x	East Germany; Birgit Peter	7:24.10	Canada; Silken Laumann	7:27.08	West Germany; Titie Jordache	7:30.03
W2x	East Germany; Kathrin Boron (b); Beate Schramm	8:18.63	Soviet Union; Inna Frolova (b); Tetiana Ustiuzhanina (s)	8:23.46	United States; Kristine Karlson (b); Alison Townley (s)	8:29.35
W4x	East Germany; Kerstin Köppen (b); Claudia Krüger (2); Sybille Schmidt (3); Jana Sorgers (s)	6:14.08	Soviet Union; Yelena Khloptseva (b); Svitlana Maziy (2); Mariya Omelianovych (3); Sariya Zakyrova (s)	6:20.25	Czechoslovakia; Hana Kafková (b); Iva Mikolova (2); Martina Šefčíková (3); Irena Soukupová (s)	6:22.33
W2-	West Germany; Stefani Werremeier (b); Ingeburg Althoff (s)	8:28.37	United States; Stephanie Maxwell-Pierson (b); Anna Seaton (s)	8:41.62	East Germany; Ina Justh (b); Birte Siech (s)	8:44.59
W4-	Romania; Doina Șnep (b); Iulia Bobeică (2); Marioara Curela (3); Doina Robu (s)	7:51.68	West Germany; Sylvia Dördelmann (b); Meike Holländer (2); Gabriele Mehl (3); Cerstin Petersmann (s)	7:52.45	East Germany; Jeannette Barth (b); Antje Frank (2); Kathrin Haacker (3); Judith Zeidler (s)	7:56.54
W8+	Romania; Doina Șnep (b); Iulia Bobeică (2); Constanța Burcică (3); Veronica Cochela (4); Marioara Curela (5); Anisoara Oprea (6); Marioara Popescu (7); Doina Ciucanu-Robu (s); Elena Nedelcu (c)	5:59.26	United States; Shelagh Donohoe (b); Cynthia Eckert (2); Sarah Gengler (3); Kelley Jones (4); Stephanie Maxwell-Pierson (5); Tracy Rude (6); Anna Seaton (7); Kathryn Young (s); Yasmin Farooq (c)	6:01.67	East Germany; Ramona Franz (b); Christiane Harzendorf (2); Anette Hohn (3); Micaela Schmidt (4); Ute Wagner (5); Annegret Strauch (6); Ute Noetzel-Wild (7); Heike Winkler (s); Yvonne Illing (c)	6:03.18
Women's lightweight events
LW1x	Denmark; Mette Bloch Jensen	8:12.64	Netherlands; Laurien Vermulst	8:14.58	Belgium; Rita Defauw	8:21.20
LW2x	Denmark; Ulla Jensen (b); Regitze Siggaard (s)	6:57.96	United States; Holly Brunkov (b); Lindsay Burns (s)	7:03.24	Canada; Brenda Colby (b); Wendy Wiebe (s)	7:03.30
LW4-	Canada; Rachel Starr (b); Jill Blois (2); Diana Sinnige (3); Colleen Miller (s)	6:38.40	Australia; Amanda Cross (b); Pam Westendorf (2); Sally Ninham (3); Rebecca Joyce (s)	6:40.32	China; Liang Sanmei (b); Lin Zhi-ai (2); Zeng Meilan (3); Zhang Huajie (s)	6:42.30

== Medal table ==
Place	Nation	1st place, gold medalist(s)	2nd place, silver medalist(s)	3rd place, bronze medalist(s)	Total
1	East Germany	5	1	5	11
2	West Germany	3	3	1	7
3	Italy	3	0	1	4
4	Soviet Union	2	3	1	6
5	Denmark	2	1	0	3
6	Romania	2	0	0	2
7	United States	1	3	1	5
8	Canada	1	2	1	4
8	Netherlands	1	2	1	4
10	Australia	1	1	2	4
11	Austria	1	0	1	2
12	France	0	2	0	2
13	Belgium	0	1	1	2
13	Czechoslovakia	0	1	1	2
15	Spain	0	1	0	1
15	Switzerland	0	1	0	1
17	Great Britain	0	0	2	2
18	China	0	0	1	1
18	New Zealand	0	0	1	1
18	Norway	0	0	1	1
18	Yugoslavia	0	0	1	1
Total		22	22	22	66
