= Lin Zhiai =

Chinese rower

Personal information
- Born: 27 December 1968 (age 57) Xinxing, Guangdong, China

Sport
- Sport: Rowing
Medal record
Representing China
World Championships
Gold medal – first place	1988 Milan	Lwt coxless fours
Gold medal – first place	1989 Bled	Lwt coxless fours
Bronze medal – third place	1990 Tasmania	Lwt coxless fours
Asian Games
Gold medal – first place	1990 Beijing	Lwt coxless fours
Summer Universiade
Silver medal – second place	1989 Duisburg	Coxless pairs

Lin Zhi-ai (born 27 December 1968) is a Chinese rower. She has won gold medals in the lightweight women's four at World Rowing Championships in 1988 and 1989. At the 1990 World Rowing Championships, she won a bronze medal in the lightweight women's four. At the 1991 World Rowing Championships, she came seventh with the women's eight. At the 1992 Summer Olympics in Barcelona, Spain, she came fifth in the women's eight.
