= Snep (disambiguation) =

Syndicat National de l'Édition Phonographique (SNEP) is a French music industry organization.

Snep or SNEP may also refer to:

- Simple NDEF Exchange Protocol, see Near field communication § ISO/IEC
- Ioan Snep (born 1966), Romanian rower
- Doina Șnep-Bălan (born 1963), Romanian rower
- A shortening of Snow leopard

== See also ==
- SNePS
