= Robu =

Robu is a Romanian surname. Notable people with the surname include:

- Doina Robu (born 1967), Romanian rower
- Ioan Robu (born 1944), Romanian Catholic prelate
- Mihai Robu (1884–1944), Romanian cleric
- Nicolae Robu (born 1955), Romanian politician
- Valentin Robu (born 1967), Romanian rower
