= Zavadil =

Zavadil (feminine Zavadilová) is a Czech surname. Notable people with the surname include:

- Lenka Zavadilová (born 1975), Czech rower
- Pavel Zavadil (born 1978), Czech footballer
- Peter Zavadil, American music video director
- Radek Zavadil (born 1973), Czech rower
