= Fabrizio Ranieri =

Italian rower

Personal information
- Born: 22 February 1968 (age 58)
- Height: 181 cm (5 ft 11 in)
- Weight: 72 kg (159 lb)

Sport
- Sport: Rowing
Medal record
Men's rowing
Representing Italy
World Championships
Gold medal – first place	1990 Tasmania	Lwt eight
Gold medal – first place	1991 Vienna	Lwt eight
Bronze medal – third place	1993 Račice	Lwt eight

Fabrizio Ranieri (born 22 February 1968) is an Italian lightweight rower. He won a gold medal at the 1990 World Rowing Championships in Tasmania with the lightweight men's eight.
