= Liao Xiaoli =

Chinese rower

Liao Xiaoli is a Chinese rower.

She was competing in the lightweight women's double sculls and came fifth at the 1989 World Rowing Championships, and fourth at the 1990 World Rowing Championships. She then changed to the lightweight women's four and won gold at the 1991 World Rowing Championships, and bronze at the 1994 World Rowing Championships.
