= Roberto Romanini =

Italian rower

Personal information
- Born: 11 April 1966 (age 60)

Sport
- Sport: Rowing
Medal record
Men's rowing
Representing Italy
World Rowing Championships
Gold medal – first place	1989 Bled	Lwt eight
Gold medal – first place	1990 Tasmania	Lwt eight
Gold medal – first place	1991 Vienna	Lwt eight
Bronze medal – third place	1994 Indianapolis	Lwt eight
Bronze medal – third place	1995 Tampere	Lwt eight

Roberto Romanini (born 11 April 1966) is an Italian lightweight rower. He won a gold medal at the 1989 World Rowing Championships in Bled with the lightweight men's eight.
