= Robert Dreher =

American lightweight rower

Sport
- Sport: Rowing
Medal record
Men's rowing
Representing United States
World Rowing Championships
Gold medal – first place	1990 Tasmania	Lwt double scull

Robert Dreher is an American lightweight rower. He won a gold medal at the 1990 World Rowing Championships in Tasmania with the lightweight men's double scull.
