= Alison Paterson =

Alison Paterson may refer to:

- Alison Paterson (company director) (born 1935), New Zealand businesswoman
- Alison Paterson (rower) (born 1966), British rower
