= Anna Seaton =

American rower

Personal information
- Full name: Anna Seaton
- Born: February 12, 1964 (age 62) Topeka, Kansas, U.S.
Medal record
Women's rowing
Representing United States
Olympic Games
Bronze medal – third place	1992 Barcelona	Coxless pairs
World Rowing Championships
Silver medal – second place	1987 Copenhagen	W8+
Silver medal – second place	1990 Tasmania	W8+
Silver medal – second place	1990 Tasmania	W2-
Silver medal – second place	1991 Vienna	W4-

Anna Seaton (born February 12, 1964) is an American rower and author. She competed in the women's eight oared shell in the 1988 Olympics and won a bronze medal in the coxless pair in 1992 at the Barcelona Games. She also won five World Championship silver medals during her six-year career on the U.S. National Rowing Team.

In 1995 she was a member of the first all women's team to vie for the America's Cup sailing trophy. Seaton wrote a book about that campaign called, Making Waves: The Inside Story of Managing and Motivating the First Women's Team to Compete for the America's Cup.

She has been inducted into the Harvard University sports Hall of Fame, the Kansas Sports Hall of Fame, and the National Rowing Foundation's Hall of Fame.

Seaton graduated from Harvard in 1986 and received a M.S. from Columbia University in 1996.
