= Nataliya Grygoryeva =

Nataliya Grygoryeva may refer to

- Nataliya Grygoryeva (hurdler) (born 1962), Ukrainian hurdle runner
- Nataliya Grigoryeva (rower) (born 1965), Russian rower
