= Michaela Vávrová =

Michaela Vávrová may refer to:

- Michaela Vávrová (golfer) (born 2000), Slovak golfer
- Michaela Vávrová (rower) (born 1974), Czech rower
