= Domenico Cantoni =

Italian rower (born 1966)

Personal information
- Born: 27 January 1966 (age 60)

Sport
- Sport: Rowing
Medal record
Men's rowing
Representing Italy
World Rowing Championships
Gold medal – first place	1991 Vienna	Lwt eight

Domenico Cantoni (born 27 January 1966) is an Italian lightweight rower. He won a gold medal at the 1991 World Rowing Championships in Vienna with the lightweight men's eight.
