= Jose Oyarzabal =

Jose Oyarzabal may refer to:

- José Ramón Oyarzábal (born 1957), Spanish rower
- José Oyarzabal (French rower) (born 1970), French rower
