= Brenda Taylor =

Brenda Taylor may refer to:

- Brenda Taylor (hurdler) (born 1979), American Olympic hurdler
- Brenda Taylor (rower) (born 1962), Canadian Olympic gold medalist in rowing
