= Matthias Ungemach =

German rower

Medal record

Men's rowing

World Rowing Championships

Representing West Germany
Gold medal – first place	1990 Tasmania	M8+

Representing Germany
Gold medal – first place	1991 Vienna	M4+

Matthias Ungemach (born 21 May 1968 in Dortmund, North Rhine-Westphalia) is a German rower (6'6"; 100 kg), double World Champion and Olympian.

Ungemach, Armin Weyrauch, Armin Eichholz, Bahne Rabe and Jorg Dederding won the 1991 World Championship in the coxed four in world record time (5:58,96), which is still unbeaten. He won another world title with the German eight in 1990 in Tasmania (Australia). Ungemach rowed in the final of the coxless four in 1992 Barcelona Spain and came fourth in a heartbeat final. Other highlights were the win of at Henley Royal Regatta, Good Will Games Seattle, Head of the Charles Boston, and 12 German Championships in all boat classes.

With his pair partner Colin von Ettingshausen he represented Germany on various world titles and in the Atlanta Olympics 1996 in the coxless pair. Matthias Ungemach retired from professional rowing afterwards.

Ungemach lives with his family in Curl Curl, New South Wales on the Northern Beaches of Sydney, Australia and is married to Judith Ungemach (née Judith Zeidler) who won Olympic gold in the women's eight in Seoul (1988) and bronze in Barcelona (1992). As of 2024, he was coach of a U23 Men's Four team for Australia Rowing.

In the hours before dawn on 22 February 2020, Ungemach was driving his SUV and towing a 10-meter trailer with rowing shells, on his way to a regatta in Penrith. As he was in the process of negotiating a traffic calming feature in heavy rain, a 66-year-old pedestrian attempted to cross the roadway behind the SUV, likely not seeing the towed trailer. The pedestrian was killed in the collision with the trailer. Months later, Ungemach was arrested and charged related to the alleged hit-and-run incident, but charges were dropped after an expert report found that the pedestrian had initiated the collision, and that Ungemach likely wouldn't have noticed the impact on the towed trailer.
