= Toby Hessian =

British rower

Personal information
- Born: 17 June 1969 (age 57)

Sport
- Sport: Rowing
Medal record
Men's rowing
Representing Great Britain
World Championships
Gold medal – first place	1991 Vienna	Lwt men's four
Gold medal – first place	1992 Montreal	Lwt men's four
Gold medal – first place	1994 Indianapolis	Lwt men's eight
Bronze medal – third place	1990 Tasmania	Lwt men's eight

Toby Hessian (born 17 June 1969) is a British lightweight rower. He was three times world champion; twice with the lightweight men's four (in 1991 in Vienna and in 1992 in Montreal) and once with the lightweight men's eight (in 1994 in Indianapolis).
