= Stephanie Maxwell-Pierson =

American rower

Personal information
- Born: January 4, 1964 (age 62) Somerville, New Jersey, U.S.
Medal record
Women's rowing
Representing United States
Olympic Games
Bronze medal – third place	1992 Barcelona	Coxless pairs
World Rowing Championships
Silver medal – second place	1987 Copenhagen	W8+
Silver medal – second place	1990 Tasmania	W8+
Silver medal – second place	1990 Tasmania	W2-
Silver medal – second place	1991 Vienna	W4-

Stephanie Maxwell-Pierson (born January 4, 1964, in Somerville, New Jersey) is an American rower.
