= Ioan Șnep =

Romanian rower

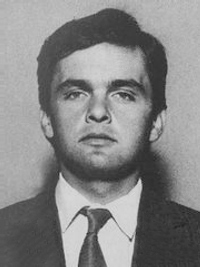

Personal information
- Born: 12 July 1966 (age 60) Negreşti-Oaş, Romania
- Height: 191 cm (6 ft 3 in)
- Weight: 94 kg (207 lb)
- Relatives: Doina Șnep-Bălan (wife); Anișoara Bălan (sister-in-law); Valentin Robu (brother-in-law)

Sport
- Sport: Rowing
- Club: Triumf Bucharest; Dinamo Bucharest; Steaua Bucharest
Medal record
Representing Romania
Olympic Games
Silver medal – second place	1988 Seoul	Coxed four
World Rowing Championships
Silver medal – second place	1989 Bled	Coxed pair
Silver medal – second place	1991 Vienna	Coxed four
Summer Universiade
Gold medal – first place	1989 Duisburg	Coxless pairs

Ioan Gabor Șnep (born 12 July 1966) is a retired Romanian rower. Competing in coxed pairs and coxed fours he won silver medals at the 1988 Olympics and 1989 and 1991 world championships. After retiring from competitions he worked as a rowing coach. His wife Doina Șnep, sister-in-law Anișoara Bălan and brother-in-law Valentin Robu are also retired Olympic rowers.
