= Irina Gribko =

Soviet rower

Personal information
- Born: 16 January 1969 (age 57) Minsk, Belarusian SSR, Soviet Union

Sport
- Sport: Rowing
Medal record
World Rowing Championships
Representing the Soviet Union
Silver medal – second place	1991 Vienna	Eight
Representing Belarus
Bronze medal – third place	1995 Tampere	Coxless four

Irina Petrovna Gribko (Russian: Ирина Петровна Грибко, born 16 January 1969) is a retired Soviet rower who won a silver medal in the eights at the 1991 World Championships. Next year her team finished fourth in this event at the 1992 Summer Olympics. She later competed for Belarus and won a bronze medal in the coxless fours at the 1995 World Championships.
