= Michael Buchheit =

German lightweight rower

Personal information
- Born: 25 October 1967 (age 58)

Sport
- Sport: Rowing
Medal record
Men's rowing
World Rowing Championships
Representing West Germany
Gold medal – first place	1989 Bled	Lwt men's four
Gold medal – first place	1990 Tasmania	Lwt men's four
Representing Germany
Gold medal – first place	1991 Vienna	Lwt men's double scull
Bronze medal – third place	1992 Montreal	Lwt men's eight
Bronze medal – third place	1995 Tampere	Lwt men's four

Michael Buchheit (born 25 October 1967) is a German lightweight rower. He won a gold medal at the 1989 World Rowing Championships in Bled with the lightweight men's four.
