= Iulia Bulie =

Romanian rower

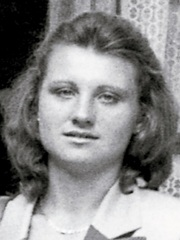

Personal information
- Born: Iulia Bobeică; 3 July 1967 (age 59) Gorbănești, Romania

Sport
- Sport: Rowing
- Club: Metalul Bucharest; Dinamo Bucharest
Medal record
Representing Romania
Olympic Games
Silver medal – second place	1992 Barcelona	Eight
World Rowing Championships
Gold medal – first place	1990 Tasmania	Coxless fours
Gold medal – first place	1990 Tasmania	Eights
Bronze medal – third place	1991 Vienna	Eights
Gold medal – first place	1993 Račice	Eights
Silver medal – second place	1994 Indianapolis	Coxless pairs
Bronze medal – third place	1994 Indianapolis	Eights
Silver medal – second place	1995 Tampere	Eights

Iulia Bulie (née Bobeică, born 3 July 1967) is a retired Romanian rower who competed at the 1992 and 1996 Olympics and several world championships in the 1990s. She had her best achievements in the eights, winning an Olympic silver medal in 1992 and the world title in 1990 and 1993. She competed under her maiden name at the 1992 Olympics, and under Iulia Bulie at the 1996 Olympics.
