= Ulla Jensen =

Danish rower

Ulla Jensen is a Danish rower. In the 1990 World Rowing Championships, she won a gold medal in the women's lightweight double sculls event. She also won a bronze medal in the same event in the 1991 World Rowing Championships.

== See also ==
Ulla Jensen at World Rowing
