= Anișoara Dobre-Bălan =

Romanian rower

Anișoara Bălan
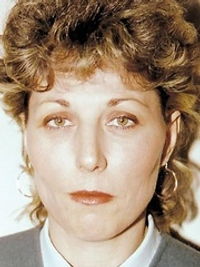

Personal information
- Born: 1 July 1966 (age 60) Liteni, Romania
- Height: 176 cm (5 ft 9 in)
- Weight: 71 kg (157 lb)
- Relatives: Doina Șnep-Bălan (sister); Ioan Snep (brother-in-law)

Sport
- Sport: Rowing
Medal record
Representing Romania
Olympic Games
Silver medal – second place	1992 Barcelona	Quadruple sculls
Bronze medal – third place	1988 Seoul	Quadruple sculls
World Rowing Championships
Gold medal – first place	1989 Bled	Eights
Silver medal – second place	1986 Nottingham	Quadruple sculls
Silver medal – second place	1991 Vienna	Double sculls
Bronze medal – third place	1985 Hazewinkel	Quadruple sculls
Bronze medal – third place	1991 Vienna	Quadruple sculls
Summer Universiade
Gold medal – first place	1987 Zagreb	Quadruple sculls

Anișoara Dobre-Bălan (née Bălan; born 1 July 1966) is a Romanian rower. Competing in quadruple sculls she won two Olympic medals, in 1988 and 1992, and three world championship medals, in 1985, 1986 and 1991. She also won the world title in women's eight in 1989. Her sister Doina Șnep-Bălan is married to Ioan Snep; both are Olympic rowers. The sisters often competed at the same tournament but in different crews.
