= Hana Žáková =

Czech rower (born 1974)

Personal information
- Nationality: Czech
- Born: 29 September 1974 (age 50); Prague, Czechoslovakia

Sport
- Sport: Rowing

Hana Žáková (born 29 September 1974) is a Czech rower. She competed in the women's eight event at the 1992 Summer Olympics.
