= Ma Linqin =

Chinese rower

Personal information
- Nationality: Chinese
- Born: 9 September 1971 (age 53)

Sport
- Sport: Rowing

Ma Linqin (born 9 September 1971) is a Chinese rower. She competed in the women's eight event at the 1992 Summer Olympics.
