= Christiane Harzendorf =

German rower

Medal record

Women's rowing

Representing East Germany

World Rowing Championships
Gold medal – first place	1989 Bled	Coxless four
Bronze medal – third place	1990 Tasmania	Eight

Representing Germany

Olympic Games
Bronze medal – third place	1992 Barcelona	Eight

World Rowing Championships
Bronze medal – third place	1993 Račice	Eight

Christiane Harzendorf (born 28 December 1967 in Borna) is a German rower.
