= Diana Olson =

American rower

Personal information
- Full name: Diana Lynn Olson
- Born: February 27, 1969 (age 56); Anchorage, Alaska, United States

Sport
- Sport: Rowing

Diana Lynn Olson (born February 27, 1969) is an American rower. She competed in the women's eight event at the 1992 Summer Olympics.
