= Yekaterina Kotko =

Soviet rower

Personal information
- Born: 20 October 1965 (age 60)

Sport
- Sport: Rowing
Medal record
Representing the Soviet Union
World Rowing Championships
Silver medal – second place	1991 Vienna	Eights

Yekaterina Kotko (Russian: Екатерина Котько, born 20 October 1965) is a retired Soviet rower who won a silver medal in the eights at the 1991 World Championships. Next year her team finished fourth in this event at the 1992 Summer Olympics.
