= Lesley Thompson =

Canadian rower (born 1959)

Medal record

Women's rowing

Representing Canada

Olympic Games
Gold medal – first place	1992 Barcelona	Eight
Silver medal – second place	1984 Los Angeles	Coxed four
Silver medal – second place	1996 Atlanta	Eight
Silver medal – second place	2012 London	Eight
Bronze medal – third place	2000 Sydney	Eight

World Championships
Gold medal – first place	1991 Vienna	Eight
Silver medal – second place	2010 Lake Karapiro	Eight
Silver medal – second place	2011 Lake Bled	Eight
Bronze medal – third place	1984 Montreal	Eight
Bronze medal – third place	1985 Hazewinkel	Coxed four
Bronze medal – third place	1986 Nottingham	Coxed four
Bronze medal – third place	1998 Cologne	Eight
Bronze medal – third place	1999 St. Catharines	Eight
Bronze medal – third place	2015 Aiguebelette	Eight

Commonwealth Games
Gold medal – first place	1986 Edinburgh	Coxed four

Lesley Allison Thompson-Willie (born September 20, 1959) is a Canadian rowing coxswain and Olympic champion. Between 1984 and 2016, she has competed at eight Olympic Games, a record for a rower, winning medals in five of them including gold in the eight at the 1992 Summer Olympics in Barcelona.

== Career ==
At the 1984 Summer Olympics in Los Angeles Thompson competed in the Women's Coxed Four event; the Canadian team won a silver medal behind gold winner Romania. At the 1988 Summer Olympics in Seoul the Canadian team qualified for the B final in the coxed four, and placed 7th. At the 1991 World Championships in Austria she won a gold medal in the eight with the Canadian team. Next year, at the 1992 Summer Olympics in Barcelona she competed in the eight, winning a gold medal for Canada. In 1996 in Atlanta she won a silver medal in the eight. At the 1998 World Championships in France she placed second in the eight. At the 2000 Summer Olympics in Sydney she won a bronze medal in the eight. At the 2008 Summer Olympics in Beijing, she coxed the Canadian eight boat that finished in fourth. When the Canadian eights won silver at the 2012 London Olympics she became the first Canadian to win medals at five different Olympic Games.

A former track athlete, she also competed in gymnastics until 1983. She lives in London and St. Catharines and is affiliated with the London RC Club. She was elected to the Canadian Olympic Hall of Fame in 1994.

She initially retired after the 2000 Sydney Olympics, missing the 2004 Summer Olympics in Athens. Her appearance at the 2008 Olympics, when her team lost out on a medal by 0.79 seconds, began back in 2005 when she made a joke to rowing coach Al Morrow about going to Beijing. When he replied, "Really?", she began training.

Aged 56, Thompson-Willie coxed the women's eight for Canada at the 2016 Olympic Games in Rio de Janeiro. Her crew would go on to finish 5th. As of 2019 she continues to train with the national team and has been named as coxswain of the Canadian men's eight for the World Rowing Cup.

She is one of only nine athletes who have competed at eight Olympic Games with her record standing alone among rowers.

== Outside rowing ==
Thompson-Willie is a graduate of the University of Western Ontario. She was a teacher-librarian and physical education teacher at South Secondary School in London, Ontario but retired in 2018. She married Dr. Paul Willie in 2000, but still competed as Lesley Thompson at the 2000 Sydney Olympics. Her husband is a professor of accounting, finance, and hotel management at Niagara College.

== See also ==
- List of athletes with the most appearances at Olympic Games
