= Regitze Siggaard =

Danish rower

Regitze Siggaard (born 22 September 1967) is a Danish rower. In the 1990 World Rowing Championships, she won a gold medal in the women's lightweight double sculls event.

== See also ==
- Regitze Siggaard at World Rowing
