= Renata Beránková =

Czech rower (born 1971)

Personal information
- Nationality: Czech
- Born: 21 March 1971 (age 54); Děčín, Czechoslovakia

Sport
- Sport: Rowing

Renata Beránková (born 21 March 1971) is a Czech rower. She competed in the women's eight event at the 1992 Summer Olympics.
