= Svitlana Fil =

Soviet rower

Personal information
- Nationality: Soviet
- Born: 4 May 1969 (age 55)

Sport
- Sport: Rowing

Svitlana Fil (born 4 May 1969) is a Soviet rower. She competed in the women's eight event at the 1992 Summer Olympics.
