= Dana Pyritz =

German rower (born 1970)

Medal record

Women's rowing

Representing Germany

Olympic Games
Bronze medal – third place	1992 Barcelona	Eight

World Rowing Championships
Gold medal – first place	1994 Indianapolis	W8+
Silver medal – second place	1995 Tampere	W4-
Bronze medal – third place	1993 Račice	W8+
Bronze medal – third place	2001 Lucerne	W8+
Bronze medal – third place	2002 Seville	W8+
Bronze medal – third place	2003 Milan	W4-

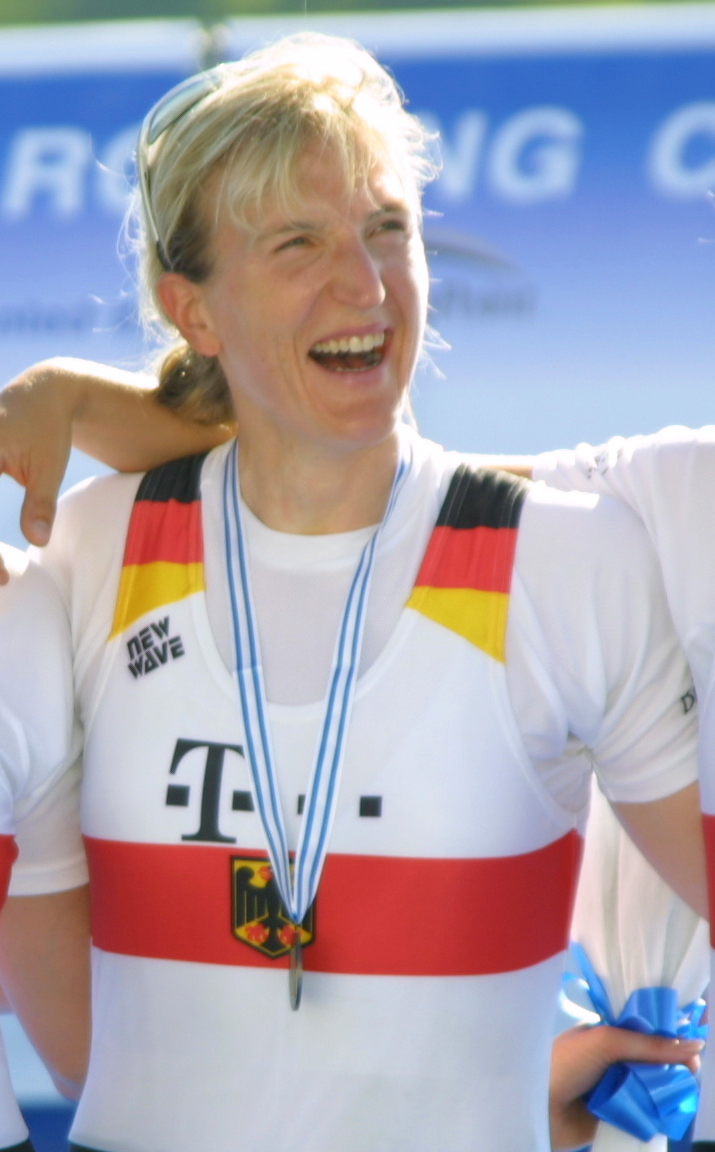
Dana Pyritz

Dana Pyritz (born 31 August 1970 in Kühlungsborn) is a German rower.
