= Ute Schell =

German rower (born 1966)

Personal information
- Born: Ute Stange; 2 April 1966 (age 60) Heubach, Masserberg, East Germany

Sport
- Sport: Rowing
- Club: SG Dynamo Potsdam; Sportvereinigung (SV) Dynamo
Medal record
Representing East Germany
Olympic Games
Gold medal – first place	1988 Seoul	Eight
World Rowing Championships
Silver medal – second place	1985 Hazewinkel	Eight
Silver medal – second place	1986 Nottingham	Eight
Bronze medal – third place	1990 Tasmania	Eight
Representing Germany
Olympic Games
Bronze medal – third place	1992 Barcelona	Eight
World Rowing Championships
Gold medal – first place	1994 Indianapolis	Eight

Ute Schell (née Stange then Wagner, born 2 April 1966) is a German rower, who competed for the SG Dynamo Potsdam / Sportvereinigung (SV) Dynamo. She has won several medals at international rowing competitions. She was first coached by Herta Weissig and then Wolfgang Schell.

She first competed under her maiden name Stange up until the 1988 Olympics; in November 1988 she received a Patriotic Order of Merit in gold under her first married name Wagner. In 1995 she married her coach Schell. She competed at the 1996 Olympics under her second married name Schell.
