= Shannon Day (rower) =

American rower

Personal information
- Full name: Shannon Lee Day
- Nationality: American
- Born: January 5, 1970 (age 55) Seattle, Washington, United States

Sport
- Sport: Rowing

Shannon Lee Day (born January 5, 1970) is an American rower. She competed in the women's eight event at the 1992 Summer Olympics. She became a rowing coach in 1996 for Union College. In 1998, she became an assistant coach at Duke University. She became an assistant coach at the University of Tennessee in 2003, and after three years moving to Colorado.
