= Viorica Neculai =

Romanian rower

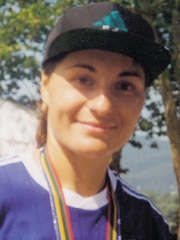

Personal information
- Born: 6 February 1967 (age 59) Vorniceni, Botoșani, Romania
- Height: 177 cm (5 ft 10 in)
- Weight: 76 kg (168 lb)

Sport
- Sport: Rowing
Medal record
Representing Romania
Olympic Games
Silver medal – second place	1988 Seoul	Eight
World Rowing Championships
Gold medal – first place	1989 Bled	Eight
Gold medal – first place	1993 Račice	Eight
Bronze medal – third place	1991 Vienna	Eight
Summer Universiade
Gold medal – first place	1989 Duisburg	Coxless four

Viorica Neculai (later Ilica, born 6 February 1967) is a retired Romanian rower. Competing in eights she won a silver medal at the 1988 Olympics and gold medals at the 1989 and 1993 world championships.

She should not be confused with Veronica Necula and Viorica Ioja, fellow rowers who competed in the same events in the same period.
