= Victoria Lepădatu =

Romanian rower (born 1971)

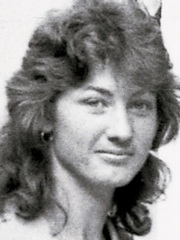

Personal information
- Born: 12 June 1971 (age 55) Vorniceni, Botoșani, Romania

Sport
- Country: Romania
- Sport: Rowing
Medal record
Olympic Games
Silver medal – second place	1992 Barcelona	Eights

Victoria Lepădatu (born 12 June 1971) is a retired Romanian rower. She competed in coxless fours and eights at the 1992 Olympics and won a silver medal in the eights.
