= Yelena Medvedeva =

Soviet rowing coxswain (born 1965)

Personal information
- Born: 21 November 1965 (age 60)

Sport
- Sport: Rowing
Medal record
Representing the Soviet Union
World Rowing Championships
| Silver medal – second place | 1991 Vienna | Eights |

Yelena Medvedeva (Russian: Елена Медведева, born 21 November 1965) is a retired Soviet rowing coxswain who won a silver medal in the eights at the 1991 World Championships. Next year her team finished fourth in this event at the 1992 Summer Olympics.
