= Gorbănești =

Gorbăneşti
- Commune
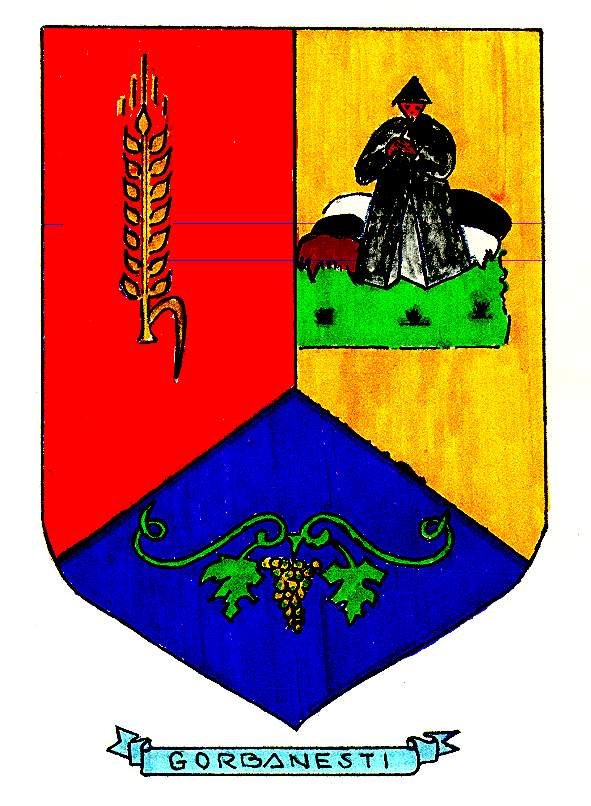
- Coat of arms

- Location in Botoșani County

- Location in Romania
- Coordinates: 47°47′N 26°51′E
- Country: Romania
- County: Botoșani
- Subdivisions: Gorbăneşti, Bătrânești, George Coșbuc, Mihai Eminescu, Silișcani, Socrujeni, Viforeni, Vânători

Government
  - Mayor (2024–2028): Ionuț Lucian Melinte (PSD)
- Area: 81.62 km^{2} (31.51 sq mi)
- Elevation: 190 m (620 ft)
- Population (2021-12-01): 3,148
  - Density: 39/km^{2} (100/sq mi)
- Time zone: EET/EEST (UTC+2/+3)
- Postal code: 717175
- Area code: +40 x31
- Vehicle reg.: BT
- Website: primariagorbanesti.ro

Gorbănești is a commune in Botoșani County, Western Moldavia, Romania. It is composed of eight villages: Bătrânești, George Coșbuc, Gorbănești, Mihai Eminescu, Silișcani, Socrujeni, Viforeni and Vânători.

== Natives ==
- Iulia Bulie
