= Marina Suprun =

Soviet rower (born 1962)

Personal information
- Born: 17 August 1962 (age 63)
- Height: 1.82 m (6 ft 0 in)
- Weight: 87 kg (192 lb)

Sport
- Sport: Rowing
- Club: Spartak Moscow
Medal record
Representing the Soviet Union
World Rowing Championships
Gold medal – first place	1985 Hazewinkel	Eights
Gold medal – first place	1986 Nottingham	Eights
Silver medal – second place	1991 Vienna	Eights
Bronze medal – third place	1987 Copenhagen	Eights

Marina Pavlovna Suprun (Russian: Марина Павловна Супрун, born 17 August 1962) is a retired Russian rower who won four medals in the eights at the world championships of 1985–1991. She finished ninth in the coxed fours at the 1988 Olympics and fourth in the eights at the 1992 Games.
