= Sarmīte Stone =

Soviet rower (born 1963)

Personal information
- Born: 30 May 1963 (age 63) Riga, Latvian SSR, Soviet Union
- Height: 1.80 m (5 ft 11 in)
- Weight: 82 kg (181 lb)

Sport
- Sport: Rowing
- Club: Spartak Riga
Medal record
Representing the Soviet Union
World Rowing Championships
Gold medal – first place	1982 Lucerne	Eights
Gold medal – first place	1983 Duisburg	Eights
Silver medal – second place	1991 Vienna	Eights
Bronze medal – third place	1987 Copenhagen	Eights
Friendship Games
Gold medal – first place	1984 Moscow	Eights

Sarmīte Stone (born 30 May 1963) is a retired Latvian rower who won four medals in the eights at the world championships of 1982–1991, competing for the Soviet Union. She finished fifth in the coxless pairs at the 1988 Olympics and fourth in the eights at the 1992 Games.
