= Yasmin Farooq =

American rower

Personal information
- Born: November 25, 1965 (age 60) Golden Valley, Minnesota, U.S.
Medal record
Women's rowing
Representing United States
World Rowing Championships
Gold medal – first place	1995 Tampere	W8+
Silver medal – second place	1990 Tasmania	W8+
Silver medal – second place	1993 Račice	W8+
Silver medal – second place	1994 Indianapolis	W8+

Yasmin Farooq (born November 25, 1965, in Golden Valley, Minnesota) is an American rowing cox and the head coach of the University of Washington women's rowing team. She graduated from Waupun High School in 1984 at Waupun, Wisconsin. She attended the University of Wisconsin where she joined the rowing team in 1984 as a coxswain. She was a member of the 1986 national champion JV eight and served as captain and MVP of the team her senior year. A two-time Olympian and world champion in rowing, Farooq later became a college coach at Stanford University where she helped the Cardinal win its first ever Pac-12 and NCAA titles in rowing. At the University of Washington, her team swept the NCAA Championship for the first-time in history, then repeated the feat in 2019 setting NCAA records in all three events. She has been named Pac-12 coach of the year six times and national coach of the year three times. She was inducted into the USRowing Hall of Fame in 2014 and awarded the Ernestine Bayer Woman of the Year award by USRowing in 2017. In 2021, Farooq was inducted into the Wisconsin Athletics Hall of Fame.

== U.S. National Team ==
Farooq was the coxswain for the first U.S. women's eight to win the World Rowing Championships in 1995 and also won silver medals in that event in 1990, 1993 and 1994. She finished 6th in the women's eight at the 1992 Summer Olympics and 4th in the women's eight at the 1996 Summer Olympics.

In 2012, Farooq served as coach of the United States Under-23 women's eight which won a gold medal at the Under-23 World Rowing Championships in Trakai, Lithuania.

In 2014, Farooq was inducted in the National Rowing Hall of Fame for her contributions to the US National Rowing Team as a coxswain.

In 2019, Farooq coached the U.S. women's pair of Megan Kalmoe and Tracy Eisser at the World Rowing Championships where the crew finished fourth and qualified for the Olympic Games.

In 2021, Farooq joined the U.S. rowing coaching staff as a support coach at the 2020 Olympic Games in Tokyo.

== Coaching at Stanford University 2006–2016 ==
In 2006, Farooq became the head coach of Stanford University's women's rowing team. In her second year at the helm, the Stanford varsity eight won a silver medal at the NCAA Championships, and she was named Pac-10 Coach of the Year. In 2009, she led the team to Stanford's first NCAA Team Title in rowing. The Stanford varsity eight set an NCAA record of 6:11.95 en route to victory in the grand final. The team title was solidified with a third-place finish by the second varsity eight and a fifth-place finish by the varsity four. Also in 2009, Farooq was named 2009 Coach of the Year by the Rowing News, and also earned "Joy of Sculling Coaches Conference Award for University Women's Coach of the Year" at the 17th Annual Joy of Sculling Conference. In 2011, Stanford finished in a tie with Brown University for first place in the NCAA team standings, but they lost the tie-breaker by .05 in the first varsity eight grand final.

In 2014, Farooq led the Cardinal women to their first Pac-12 Conference Title. Stanford swept all three varsity events. The Cardinal went on to finish fourth at the NCAA Championships in Indianapolis, IN. Farooq was named Pac-12 Coach of the Year.

In 2016, after leading the Cardinal to a 4th-place finish at the NCAA's, Farooq resigned to become head coach at the University of Washington. In her 10 years at Stanford, Farooq led her crews to five NCAA podium finishes. Under Farooq, 138 Cardinal rowers earned Academic All-Pac-12 honors and 74 were named CRCA Scholar-Athletes. 28 Stanford rowers during her tenure were named CRCA All-America.

Stanford Olympians coached by Farooq include Elle Logan, an NCAA champion (2009), three-time world champion, three-time Olympic gold medalist (2008, 2012 and 2016, all in the U.S. eight). Logan was named Pac-12 Women's Rower of the Century in 2016. Farooq also coached 2016 Olympian Grace Luczak at Stanford. Luczak was also a member of Stanford's NCAA Championship team in 2009 and is a three-time World Champion (2013, 2014, 2015) as a member of the U.S. women's eight and four. Luczak competed in the U.S. women's pair that finished 4th at the Rio de Janeiro Games.

== Coaching at the University of Washington 2016–present ==
In her first season at Washington, Farooq led the Huskies to a sweep of the Pac-12 Championship and the 2017 NCAA Championship after a 16-year drought. Washington won all three grand finals, accomplishing that sweep for the first time in the 21-year history of the NCAA Regatta. The championship was the Huskies' fourth NCAA rowing title and their first since 2001. In winning the title, Farooq became both the first coach to win an NCAA rowing championship in her first season with the winning program and the first to win it as head coach of two different schools. The UW's rowing championship was also the 500th team championship to be won by a Pac-12 Conference program. At season's end, Farooq was named Pac-12 Coach of the Year and also the Collegiate Rowing Coaches Association (CRCA) national coach of the year. In 2017 USRowing awarded her the Ernestine Bayer Award (formerly Woman of the Year).

In 2018, Washington swept the Pac-12 Championship again and finished as NCAA Runner-Up with a second-place finish in the varsity eight, a first-place finish in the second varsity eight and second-place finish in the varsity four. Farooq earned Pac-12 Coach of the Year honors.

In 2019, Washington made history again when Farooq's team swept the NCAA Championships setting NCAA records in all three events. The varsity eight stunned the field with a sprint from sixth place to first in the final 500m to capture the win. Farooq earned coach of the year honors again in the Pac-12 and nationally.

After the 2020 season was cancelled due to the pandemic, Farooq's Huskies finished in a three-way tie with Texas and Stanford at the 2021 NCAA Championships in Sarasota, Fla. Washington won the fours and second eights grand finals, but finished third in the first eights final. The tie-breaker (best finish in the first eights final) meant that Texas won the NCAA title, with Stanford second and Washington third. Farooq was named CRCA Region 5 Coach of the Year and Pac-12 Co-Coach of the Year with her long-time friend, UCLA head coach Amy Fuller.

In 2022, the Washington women finished second in the Pac-12 and fourth overall at the NCAA Regatta with a fifth-place finish in the varsity eight, a third-place finish in the second varsity eight and a fifth-place finish in the varsity four.

In 2023, the Huskies finished second in the Pac-12 to Stanford and entered the NCAA's ranked eighth overall. At the NCAA Regatta, the varsity eight and second varsity eight finished second. With points from the varsity four's eighth-place finish, the Huskies earned an NCAA Runner-Up finish to Stanford.

In 2024, Washington finished third at the last-ever Pac-12 Championship regatta, behind Stanford and California. At NCAAs, all three Husky crews advanced to the grand finals. UW's crews finished fourth in the second varsity eight final and sixth in both the first eights and the fours, good for a fifth-place overall finish. It marked the seventh time in seven NCAA regattas under Farooq that the UW finished in the top-five in the country.

Washington Olympians. At the 2020 Olympic Games (held in 2021), five women coached by Farooq at UW represented their countries. Brooke Mooney and Jessica Thoennes were both in the U.S. women's eight. Chiara Ondoli (women's double) and Valentina Iseppi (women's quad) both rowed for Italy, and Phoebe Spoors was an alternate for New Zealand. Farooq served as a support coach for the U.S. Team.

Washington sent a total of seven women's team alumnae to the 2024 Olympic Games in Paris, with three of those seven earning medals. As a program (men's and women's teams), Washington won a total of 11 Olympic medals, most-sever in program history. Holly Dunford won a bronze medal in the Great Britain women's eight, while Germany's Tabea Schendekehl earned bronze in the quad and New Zealand's Spoors took bronze in the four. Additionally, Thoeness finished fourth in the pair, Teal Cohen (USA) was ninth in the quad, coxswain Nina Castagna (USA) took fifth in the eight, and Italian Aisha Rocek was sixth in the eight.

== Rowing Analyst ==
Farooq has worked as rowing commentator for NBC's Olympic broadcasts in Sydney 2000, Athens 2004, Beijing 2008, and London 2012. She was also the rowing analyst for NBC's Universal Sports, covering World Cup regattas and the World Championships.

== Personal life ==
Farooq is married to Roger Waterman, a television cameraman and producer. Farooq also hosts COXSWAINation.com, a web resource for rowing coaches and coxswains. She is of Kashmiri descent.
