= Tina Brown (rower) =

American rower

Personal information
- Full name: Christina Brown
- Born: January 5, 1968 (age 58) Peterborough, New Hampshire, United States

Sport
- Sport: Rowing

Achievements and titles
- Olympic finals: 1992 Summer Olympics

Christina Brown (born January 5, 1968) is an American rower. She competed in the women's eight event at the 1992 Summer Olympics.
