= Lenka Kováčová =

Czech rowing cox

Personal information
- Nationality: Czech
- Born: 22 May 1966 (age 58); Prague, Czechoslovakia
- Height: 160 cm (5 ft 3 in)
- Weight: 45 kg (99 lb)

Sport
- Sport: Rowing

Lenka Kováčová (born 22 May 1966) is a Czech rowing coxswain. She competed in the women's eight event at the 1992 Summer Olympics.
