= Maria Păduraru =

Romanian rower (born 1970)

Personal information
- Born: 5 October 1970 (age 55) Negrești, Romania

Sport
- Sport: Rowing
Medal record
Representing Romania
Olympic Games
| Silver medal – second place | 1992 Barcelona | Eight |
World Rowing Championships
| Bronze medal – third place | 1991 Vienna | Eight |
Summer Universiade
| Gold medal – first place | 1993 Buffalo | Coxless four |

Maria Păduraru (born 5 October 1970) is a Romanian rower. She competed at the 1992 Summer Olympics winning a silver medal in the women's eight.
