= José Oyarzabal (French rower) =

French rower (born 1970)

Personal information
- Born: 13 February 1970 (age 56)

Sport
- Sport: Rowing
Medal record
Representing France
World Championships
Silver medal – second place	1990 Tasmania	Lwt coxless four
Silver medal – second place	1991 Vienna	Lwt eights
Bronze medal – third place	1992 Montreal	Lwt coxless four
Summer Universiade
Gold medal – first place	1993 Buffalo	Lwt coxless four

José Oyarzabal (born 13 February 1970) is a French rower.

He won a silver medal in eights at the 1988 World Junior Rowing Championships, a silver medal in coxless fours at the 1990 World Rowing Championships, a silver medal in eights at the 1990 World Rowing Championships, and a bronze medal in coxless fours at the 1992 World Rowing Championships.
