= Annegret Strauch =

German rower

Medal record

Women's rowing

Representing East Germany

Olympic Games
Gold medal – first place	1988 Seoul	Eight

World Rowing Championships
Bronze medal – third place	1990 Tasmania	Eight

Representing Germany

Olympic Games
Bronze medal – third place	1992 Barcelona	Eight

Annegret Strauch (born 1 December 1968 in Radebeul) is a German rower.
