= Lenka Zavadilová =

Czech rower (born 1975)

Personal information
- Nationality: Czech
- Born: 7 July 1975 (age 49); Prague, Czechoslovakia
- Relatives: Radek Zavadil (brother)

Sport
- Sport: Rowing

Lenka Zavadilová (born 7 July 1975) is a Czech rower. She competed in the women's eight event at the 1992 Summer Olympics. Her brother Radek Zavadil is also an Olympic rower.
