= Liang Xiling =

Chinese rower

Personal information
- Nationality: Chinese
- Born: 12 July 1971 (age 55)

Sport
- Sport: Rowing

Liang Xiling (born 12 July 1971) is a Chinese rower. She competed at the 1992 Summer Olympics and the 1996 Summer Olympics.
