= Tracy Rude =

American rower

Personal information
- Born: September 25, 1968 (age 57) Appleton, Wisconsin, United States

Sport
- Country: United States
- Sport: Rowing
- College team: Syracuse Orange (1987–1990)

Tracy Rude (born September 25, 1968) is an American rower. She competed in the women's eight event at the 1992 Summer Olympics.

Rude graduated from Syracuse University in 1990 from the S.I. Newhouse School of Public Communications. At Syracuse, she rowed for the Syracuse Orange women's rowing team.

Rude was inducted into the Orange Plus Hall of Fame (Syracuse) in 1999. She also served as President of the Syracuse Alumni Rowing Association (SARA) beginning in 2010, becoming the first woman to lead the organization in its 57-year history.

Rude joined Community Rowing, Inc. in 2012.

In 2022, Rude was inducted into the Syracuse Alumni Rowing Association (SARA) Hall of Fame.
