= Nataliya Grigoryeva (rower) =

Russian rower

Personal information
- Born: 8 December 1965 (age 60)

Sport
- Sport: Rowing
Medal record
Representing the Soviet Union
World Rowing Championships
Silver medal – second place	1985 Hazewinkel	Quad sculls
Silver medal – second place	1991 Vienna	Eights
Summer Universiade
Silver medal – second place	1989 Duisburg	Quad sculls

Nataliya Semyonovna Grigoryeva (Russian: Наталья Григорьева, born 8 December 1965) is a retired Russian rower who won two silver medals at the world championships of 1985 and 1991. She finished fourth in the eights event at the 1992 Summer Olympics.
