= Michaela Vávrová (rower) =

Czech rower (born 1974)

Personal information
- Nationality: Czech
- Born: 1 April 1974 (age 52) Prague, Czechoslovakia

Sport
- Sport: Rowing

Michaela Vávrová (born 1 April 1974) is a Czech rower. She competed in the women's eight event at the 1992 Summer Olympics.
