= Megan Delehanty =

Canadian rower (born 1968)

Personal information
- Born: Megan Catherine Delehanty; March 24, 1968 (age 58) Edmonton, Alberta, Canada
Medal record
Women's rowing
Representing Canada
Olympic Games
| Gold medal – first place | 1992 Barcelona | Eight |

Megan Catherine Delehanty (born March 24, 1968) is a Canadian rower. She won a gold medal at the 1992 Summer Olympics in Barcelona, in the women's eight.
