= Radek Zavadil =

Czech rower

Personal information
- Nationality: Czech
- Born: 16 March 1973 (age 52); Prague, Czechoslovakia
- Relatives: Lenka Zavadilová (sister)

Sport
- Sport: Rowing

Radek Zavadil (born 16 March 1973) is a Czech rower. He competed in the men's eight event at the 1992 Summer Olympics. His sister Lenka Zavadilová is also an Olympic rower.
