= Kirsten Barnes =

Canadian rower (born 1968)

Personal information
- Born: March 26, 1968 (age 58) Westminster, London, Great Britain

Sport
- Sport: Rowing
Medal record
Representing Canada
Olympic Games
Gold medal – first place	1992 Barcelona	Coxless four
Gold medal – first place	1992 Barcelona	Eight
World Championships
Gold medal – first place	1991 Vienna	Coxless four
Gold medal – first place	1991 Vienna	Eight
Pan American Games
Gold medal – first place	1987 Indianapolis	Coxless pair
Summer Universiade
Silver medal – second place	1989 Duisburg	Coxless four

Jennifer-Kirsten Barnes (born March 26, 1968) is a Canadian rower and double Olympic champion.

Barnes was born in London, UK, in 1968. She competed at the 1988 Summer Olympics in the Coxless pair, with Sarah Ann Ogilvie as her rowing partner, where they came seventh.
