= Judith Zeidler =

German rower

Medal record

Women's rowing

Olympic Games

Representing East Germany
Gold medal – first place	1988 Seoul	Eight

Representing Germany
Bronze medal – third place	1992 Barcelona	Eight

World Rowing Championships

Representing East Germany
Gold medal – first place	1989 Bled	Coxless pairs
Bronze medal – third place	1990 Tasmania	Coxless fours

Representing Germany
Bronze medal – third place	1991 Vienna	Coxless fours

Judith Ungemach (née Zeidler, born 11 May 1968) is a German world champion rower and Olympic gold and bronze medalist.

== Early life and education ==
Zeidler was born in Beeskow, Brandenburg. She started rowing at the age of thirteen at the East German best rowing club Dynamo Berlin (later Sport Club Berlin).

== Career ==
After three World Junior titles, Zeidler won gold in the women's eight at the 1988 Summer Olympics. A year later she won the world titles in Bled (Slovenia) in the coxless pair. At the 1992 Summer Olympics she won bronze in the women's eight with the unified German eight.

Zeidler lives with her husband, Matthias Ungemach, and two sons and one daughter on Sydney's Northern Beaches.

== Achievements ==
=== Junior world championships ===
- 1984: Jönköping (SWE) – 1st place (quadruple scull)
- 1986: Roudnice (CZE) – 1st place (quadruple scull)

=== World championships ===
- 1989: Bled (SLO) – 1st place (coxless pair)
- 1990: Lake Barrington (AUS) – 3rd place (coxless four)
- 1991: Vienna (AUT) – 3rd place (coxless four)

=== Olympics ===
- 1988: Seoul (KOR) – 1st place (eight)
- 1992: Barcelona (SPA) – 3rd place (eight)

== See also ==
- German Australian
