= Pei Jiayun =

Chinese rower

Pei Jiayun (Chinese: 裴佳云; pinyin: Péi Jiāyún; born 20 June 1971) is a Chinese rower. At the 1993 World Rowing Championships in Račice, Czech Republic, she won a gold medal in the women's coxless four. She also competed at the 1992 Summer Olympics.

Her husband was a victim of the COVID-19 pandemic.
