= Valentin Robu =

Romanian rower

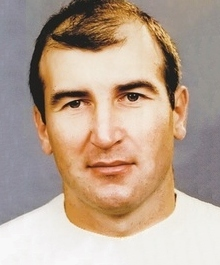

Personal information
- Born: 17 January 1967 (age 59) Săbăoani, Romania
- Height: 193 cm (6 ft 4 in)
- Weight: 96 kg (212 lb)

Sport
- Sport: Rowing
- Club: Dinamo Bucharest
Medal record
Representing Romania
Olympic Games
Silver medal – second place	1988 Seoul	Coxed four
Silver medal – second place	1992 Barcelona	Eight
World Rowing Championships
Gold medal – first place	1989 Bled	Coxed four
Gold medal – first place	1994 Indianapolis	Coxed four
Silver medal – second place	1991 Vienna	Coxed four
Silver medal – second place	1993 Račice	Eight
Silver medal – second place	1997 Aiguebelette	Eight
Bronze medal – third place	1994 Indianapolis	Eight
Bronze medal – third place	1998 Cologne	Eight
Bronze medal – third place	1999 St. Catharines	Coxed four
Summer Universiade
Gold medal – first place	1987 Zagreb	Coxed fours
Gold medal – first place	1989 Duisburg	Coxed fours

Valentin Robu (born 17 January 1967) is a retired Romanian rower. He competed in coxed fours and eights at four Olympics and eight world championships, and won two Olympic silver medals in 1988 and 1992 and eight world championship medals, including gold medals in 1989 and 1994. After retiring from competitions he worked as a rowing coach. His wife Doina Robu and brother-in-law Ioan Snep are also retired Olympic rowers.
