= Marnie McBean =

Canadian rower (born 1968)

The Honourable Marnie McBean OC MSM

Canadian Senator from Ontario
- Incumbent
- Assumed office December 20, 2023
- Nominated by: Justin Trudeau
- Appointed by: Mary Simon

Personal details
- Born: Marnie Elizabeth McBean; January 28, 1968 (age 58) Vancouver, British Columbia, Canada
- Party: Independent Senators Group
- Spouse: Deanah Shelly (m. 2014)
- Sports career
- Country: Canada
- Sport: Women's rowing
Medal record
Women's rowing
Representing Canada
Olympic Games
Gold medal – first place	1992 Barcelona	Coxless pair
Gold medal – first place	1992 Barcelona	Eight
Gold medal – first place	1996 Atlanta	Double sculls
Bronze medal – third place	1996 Atlanta	Quadruple sculls
World Championships
Gold medal – first place	1991 Vienna	Coxless pair
Gold medal – first place	1991 Vienna	Eight
Gold medal – first place	1995 Tampere	Double sculls
Silver medal – second place	1993 Račice	Single sculls
Silver medal – second place	1994 Indianapolis	Double sculls
Silver medal – second place	1995 Tampere	Quadruple sculls
Silver medal – second place	1998 Cologne	Coxless four
Bronze medal – third place	1998 Cologne	Eight
World Junior Championships
Gold medal – first place	1986 Račice	Coxless pair
Pan American Games
Gold medal – first place	1995 Mar del Plata	Double sculls
Gold medal – first place	1999 Winnipeg	Single sculls
Summer Universiade
Gold medal – first place	1993 Buffalo	Coxless four
Silver medal – second place	1989 Duisburg	Coxless four
Silver medal – second place	1993 Buffalo	Single sculls

Marnie Elizabeth McBean, OC MSM (born January 28, 1968) is a Canadian former rower. She is a three-time Olympic gold medallist. In 2023, she was appointed to the Senate of Canada.

== Rowing career ==
A graduate of the University of Western Ontario, McBean competed at the 1992 Summer Olympics in the coxless pairs and eights events, winning gold medals in both.

In 1994, McBean won the Princess Royal Challenge Cup (the premier women's singles sculls event) at the Henley Royal Regatta, rowing for the Western Middlesex RC.

At the 1996 Summer Olympics she competed in the double and quadruple sculls, winning gold in the double and bronze in the quadruple. With her long-time rowing partner Kathleen Heddle, she was the first Canadian to win three Olympic Gold medals. In addition to her other exploits, McBean won a Silver medal in the single scull event at the 1993 World Rowing Championships.

At the 2000 Sydney Olympics, McBean was set to represent Canada in the single scull and she had hoped to win a fourth gold medal. After travelling to Australia, a back injury which eventually required an operation forced McBean to withdraw from the Olympics and McBean decided to retire from international competition.

== Accolades and personal life ==
In 1997, McBean was inducted into the Canadian Sports Hall of Fame. In 2002, McBean was awarded the Thomas Keller Medal by FISA, the International Rowing Federation, for her outstanding career in international rowing. In 1997, she was awarded the Meritorious Service Medal (civil division). In 2013, she was made an Officer of the Order of Canada. She has been appointed as chef de mission of Canada's team at the 2020 Olympic Games, to be held in Tokyo.

After retiring from active competition, McBean came out as gay. She met her partner Deanah Shelly in 2010, and the couple married in April 2014. They have a daughter named Isabel.

In 2015, McBean was presented the Bonham Centre Award from The Mark S. Bonham Centre for Sexual Diversity Studies, University of Toronto, for her contributions to the advancement and education of issues around sexual identification.
