= Sylvia Dördelmann =

German rower (born 1970)

Medal record

Women's rowing

Olympic Games

Representing Germany
Bronze medal – third place	1992 Barcelona	Eights

World Rowing Championships

Representing West Germany
Silver medal – second place	1990 Tasmania	W4-

Sylvia Dördelmann (born 7 April 1970 in Waltrop) is a German rower.
