= Doina Robu =

Romanian rower

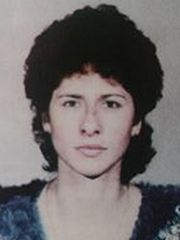

Personal information
- Born: 22 July 1967 (age 59) Piatra Neamț, Romania
- Spouse: Valentin Robu

Sport
- Sport: Rowing
- Club: Steaua Bucuresti
Medal record
Representing Romania
Olympic Games
Silver medal – second place	1992 Barcelona	Eight
World Rowing Championships
Gold medal – first place	1990 Tasmania	Coxless four
Gold medal – first place	1993 Račice	Eight
Silver medal – second place	1986 Nottingham	Quadruple sculls
Bronze medal – third place	1991 Vienna	Eight
Summer Universiade
Gold medal – first place	1987 Zagreb	Quadruple sculls

Doina Robu (née Ciucanu; born 22 July 1967) is a retired Romanian rower who won a silver medal at the 1992 Olympics. She also won two gold, one silver and one bronze medal at the world championships between 1986 and 1993. She is married to the Olympic rower Valentin Robu. She competed at the 1990 World Rowing Championships under her married name.
