= Cerstin Petersmann =

German rower (born 1964)

Medal record

Women's rowing

Representing West Germany

World Rowing Championships
Silver medal – second place	1990 Tasmania	W4-

Representing Germany

Olympic Games
Bronze medal – third place	1992 Barcelona	Eights

World Rowing Championships
Bronze medal – third place	1991 Vienna	W4-

Cerstin Petersmann (born 27 November 1964 in Dortmund) is a German rower.
