= Martina Šefčíková =

Czech rower (born 1971)

Personal information
- Nationality: Czech
- Born: 1 June 1971 (age 53); Jindřichův Hradec, Czechoslovakia

Sport
- Sport: Rowing

Martina Šefčíková (born 1 June 1971) is a Czech rower. She competed in the women's eight event at the 1992 Summer Olympics.
