= Doina Șnep-Bălan =

Romanian rower

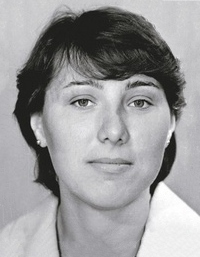
- circa 1980s

Personal information
- Born: Doina Liliana Bălan; 10 December 1963 (age 62) Liteni, Romania
- Height: 175 cm (5 ft 9 in)
- Weight: 68 kg (150 lb)
- Relatives: Anișoara Bălan (sister); Ioan Șnep (husband)

Sport
- Sport: Rowing
- Club: Dinamo Bucharest
Medal record
Representing Romania
Olympic Games
Silver medal – second place	1984 Los Angeles	Eight
Silver medal – second place	1988 Seoul	Eight
Silver medal – second place	1992 Barcelona	Eight
Bronze medal – third place	1988 Seoul	Coxed four
World Rowing Championships
Gold medal – first place	1986 Nottingham	Coxed four
Gold medal – first place	1990 Tasmania	Coxless four
Gold medal – first place	1990 Tasmania	Eight
Silver medal – second place	1989 Bled	Coxless pair
Bronze medal – third place	1985 Hazewinkel	Eight
Bronze medal – third place	1991 Vienna	Eight
Summer Universiade
Gold medal – first place	1989 Duisburg	Coxless fours

Doina Liliana Bălan (later Șnep, born 10 December 1963) is a retired Romanian rower. She competed at the 1984, 1988 and 1992 Olympics and five world championships between 1985 and 1991 and won 10 medals, including three gold medals. Her husband Ioan Șnep and sister Anișoara Bălan are also Olympic rowers.
