= Kathleen Heddle =

Canadian Olympic rower (1965–2021)

Kathleen Joan Heddle
Personal information
- Born: November 27, 1965 Trail, British Columbia
- Died: January 11, 2021 (aged 55) Vancouver, British Columbia

Sport
- Sport: Rowing
- Club: Burnaby Lake Rowing Club
Medal record
Event	1st	2nd	3rd
Olympic Games	3	0	1
World Championships	3	2	0
Pan American Games	1	0	0
Summer Universiade	0	1	0
Women's rowing
Representing Canada
Olympic Games
Gold medal – first place	1992 Barcelona	Coxless pair
Gold medal – first place	1992 Barcelona	Eight
Gold medal – first place	1996 Atlanta	Double sculls
Bronze medal – third place	1996 Atlanta	Quadruple sculls
World Championships
Gold medal – first place	1991 Vienna	Coxless pairs
Gold medal – first place	1991 Vienna	Eight
Gold medal – first place	1995 Tampere	Double sculls
Silver medal – second place	1994 Indianapolis	Double sculls
Silver medal – second place	1995 Tampere	Quadruple sculls
Pan American Games
Gold medal – first place	1987 Indianapolis	Coxless pairs
Summer Universiade
Silver medal – second place	1989 Duisburg	Coxless fours

Kathleen Joan Heddle, OBC (November 27, 1965 – January 11, 2021) was a Canadian Olympic rower. She and her long-time rowing partner Marnie McBean were the first Canadians to be awarded three Olympic gold medals at the Summer Games. They also won a silver in double sculls at the 1994 World Championships.

== Early life ==
Heddle was born in Trail, British Columbia, on November 27, 1965. Her father, Duncan, worked as a geological engineer; her mother, Marilyn (Buchanan), was a registered dietitian and housewife. Heddle had two sisters (Libby and Peggy) and one brother (Murray). The family moved to the Kitsilano neighbourhood of Vancouver when she was twenty months old, and she graduated from Kitsilano Secondary School. Heddle went on to study psychology at the University of British Columbia (UBC), obtaining a bachelor's degree in 1990.

Although she initially played volleyball and intended to make the varsity team, her interest in rowing was piqued when she passed by the team's booth while registering for courses during her junior year at the War Memorial Gymnasium. She was selected in large part due to her height and rowed with the team for two years. During this time, she suffered extreme anxiety and apprehension during major races. Heddle was promoted to the national team in 1987, and won a gold medal in straight pairs at the Pan American Games that year.

== Career ==
Heddle was part of the quartet that finished in fourth place in both the 1989 and 1990 World Rowing Championships. She was consequently paired with Marnie McBean by their coach. McBean was initially doubtful of their partnership, with her outgoing personality contrasting with Heddle's introversion. McBean interpreted this as a lack of ambition and competitiveness, and even went as far as to request a new partner. Their coach responded, "You do realize that Kathleen is the best rower on the team, and she's even better than you, Marnie". At the 1991 World Cup in Lucerne, their first major tournament together, they defeated the defending world champions in their opening race. The same year, they won a gold medal in straight pairs at the World Championships, and secured another gold as part of Canada's eights team. They replicated their performance at the 1992 Summer Olympics, winning gold medals in straight pairs and eights.

Heddle took a one-year hiatus from the sport in 1993, and changed to sculling. On her return at the 1994 World Championships, she and McBean finished runners-up in double sculls. They improved on their result at the championships the following year, and also secured silver as part of the quad sculls team. Her final event before retiring was the 1996 Summer Olympics in Atlanta, where she won a gold medal with McBean in double sculls and a bronze in the quad sculls. At the time of her death, she and McBean were the only Canadians to win three gold medals at the Summer Olympic Games.

== Honours ==
Heddle was inducted into the Canadian Olympic Hall of Fame in 1994. Three years later, she was awarded the Order of British Columbia, inducted into the Canadian Sports Hall of Fame, and named B.C. Athlete of the Year. She was also conferred the Thomas Keller Medal by FISA, the International Rowing Federation, for her outstanding career in international rowing in 1999.

Heddle was enshrined into the BC Sports Hall of Fame in 2003. She was subsequently granted an honorary doctorate of letters by UBC (her alma mater) in November 2004.

== Personal life ==
After retiring, Heddle moved to Kerrisdale in Vancouver. She married Mike Bryden in October 2000. They had two children, one of whom also studied at UBC and joined its rowing team.

Heddle died on January 11, 2021, at her home in Vancouver. She was 55, and had breast cancer and lymphoma followed by melanoma and brain cancer in the six years preceding her death.
