= Kelley Jones (rower) =

American rower

Personal information
- Born: December 8, 1965 (age 59); Houston, Texas, United States

Sport
- Sport: Rowing

Kelley Jones (born December 8, 1965) is an American rower. She competed in the women's eight event at the 1992 Summer Olympics.
