= Jessica Monroe =

Canadian rower (born 1966)

Medal record

Women's rowing

Representing Canada

Olympic Games
Gold medal – first place	1992 Barcelona	Coxless four
Gold medal – first place	1992 Barcelona	Eight
Silver medal – second place	1996 Atlanta	Eight

Jessica Monroe (born May 31, 1966), also known under her married name Gonin, is a Canadian rower. She was born in Palo Alto, California. Monroe won two gold medals at the 1992 Summer Olympics in Barcelona, in the coxless four and in the eight, and a silver medal in 1996 in Atlanta.

== Awards and honours ==
In 2013, Monroe was inducted into the Canada's Sports Hall of Fame.
