= Mette Bloch Jensen =

Danish rower

Mette Bloch Jensen (born 13 February 1966) is a Danish rower. In the 1992 World Rowing Championships, she won a gold medal in the lightweight women's single sculls event.

== See also ==
- Mette Bloch Jensen at World Rowing
