= Vorniceni, Botoșani =

Vorniceni
- Commune
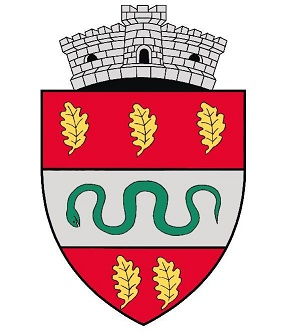
- Coat of arms

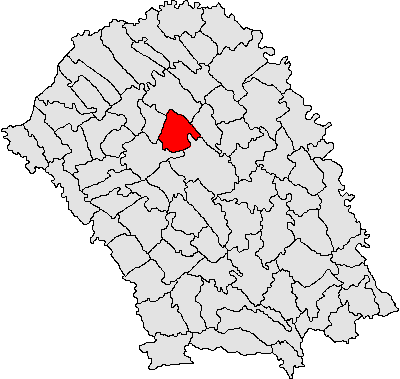
- Location in Botoșani County

- Location in Romania
- Coordinates: 47°59′N 26°40′E
- Country: Romania
- County: Botoșani
- Subdivisions: Vorniceni, Davidoaia, Dealu Crucii

Government
  - Mayor (2024–2028): Lucian Ioan Ungureanu (PSD)
- Area: 60 km^{2} (23 sq mi)
- Elevation: 200 m (660 ft)
- Population (2021-12-01): 3,700
  - Density: 62/km^{2} (160/sq mi)
- Time zone: UTC+02:00 (EET)
  - Summer (DST): UTC+03:00 (EEST)
- Postal code: 717470
- Area code: +40 x31
- Vehicle reg.: BT
- Website: primaria-vorniceni.ro

Vorniceni is a commune in Botoșani County, Western Moldavia, Romania. It is composed of three villages: Davidoaia, Dealu Crucii and Vorniceni.
