= Kathrin Haacker =

German rower

Medal record

Women's rowing

Representing East Germany

Rowing at the Summer Olympics
Gold medal – first place	1988 Seoul	Eight

World Rowing Championships
Gold medal – first place	Bled 1989	Double sculls
Silver medal – second place	Copenhagen 1987	Double sculls
Silver medal – second place	Tasmania 1990	Coxless four
Bronze medal – third place	Nottingham 1986	Double sculls

Representing Germany

Rowing at the Summer Olympics
Bronze medal – third place	1992 Barcelona	Eight

World Rowing Championships
Gold medal – first place	Indianapolis 1994	Eight
Bronze medal – third place	Roudnice 1993	Eight

Kathrin Haacker (born 3 April 1967 in Wismar, Bezirk Rostock) is a German former rower, who competed for SC Dynamo Berlin. She won medals at Olympic and world championships.
