= Fiona Freckleton =

British rower

Personal information
- Born: 6 November 1960 (age 65) Chelmsford, England
- Education: Somerville College, Oxford

Sport
- Sport: Rowing
- Club: Somerville College Boat Club; Westminster School

Fiona Freckleton (born 6 November 1960) is a British rower. She competed in the women's eight event at the 1992 Summer Olympics.

Freckleton is a bronze medalist in the Women's Pairs at the 1991 World Rowing Championships in Vienna, Great Britain's first medal in a major World Championship women's rowing event. She also competed at the 1993 World Rowing Championships.

Freckleton studied at Somerville College, Oxford.

She competed for Scotland at the 1986 Commonwealth Games where she finished 4th in the coxless pairs event alongside Morag Simpson.
