= Susan Smith (rower) =

British rower

Personal information
- Nationality: British
- Born: 1 June 1965 (age 59); Norwich, England

Sport
- Sport: Rowing

Susan Smith (born 1 June 1965) is a British rower. She competed at the 1988 Summer Olympics and the 1992 Summer Olympics.
