= Alison Paterson (rower) =

British rower

Personal information
- Full name: Alison Murray Paterson
- Nationality: British
- Born: 29 May 1966 (age 58); Edinburgh, Scotland

Sport
- Sport: Rowing

Alison Murray Paterson (born 29 May 1966) is a British rower. She competed in the women's eight event at the 1992 Summer Olympics.
