= Philippa Cross =

British rower

Personal information
- Nationality: British
- Born: 7 July 1966 (age 58); Banbury, England

Sport
- Sport: Rowing

Philippa Cross (born 7 July 1966) is a British rower. She competed at the 1992 Summer Olympics and the 1996 Summer Olympics. Cross also represented Durham University Women's Boat Club.
