= Dot Blackie =

British rower

Personal information
- Born: 18 February 1967 (age 58); St Andrews, Scotland

Sport
- Sport: Rowing

Dorothy Roberts (née Blackie; born 18 February 1967) is a British retired rower. She competed at the 1992 Summer Olympics, 1996 Summer Olympics and the 2000 Summer Olympics.

Roberts is Pathway and Performance Manager for Scottish Swimming and a member of the Scottish Rowing Board of Directors serving as the Director of Performance.
