= Brenda Taylor (rower) =

Canadian rower

Medal record

Women's rowing

Representing Canada

Olympic Games
Gold medal – first place	1992 Barcelona	Coxless four
Gold medal – first place	1992 Barcelona	Eights

Brenda Taylor (born October 28, 1962, in Nanaimo, British Columbia) is a Canadian rower. She won two gold medals at the 1992 Summer Olympics in Barcelona, in the coxless four and in the eight. She was inducted into the Canada's Sports Hall of Fame in 2013.
