= Katharine Brownlow =

British rower

Personal information
- Full name: Katharine Charlotte Deirdre Brownlow
- Nationality: British
- Born: 16 August 1964 (age 60); Altrincham, England

Sport
- Sport: Rowing

Katharine Charlotte Deirdre Brownlow (born 16 August 1964) is a British rower. She competed in the women's eight event at the 1992 Summer Olympics.
