= World Rowing Championships =

International rowing event

- Status: Active
- Genre: Rowing World championship
- Date: Varying
- Frequency: Annual
- Country: Varying
- Inaugurated: 1962
- Most recent: 2025
- Next event: 2026
- Organiser: World Rowing
- Website: worldrowing.com

The World Rowing Championships is an international rowing regatta organized by FISA (the International Rowing Federation). It is a week-long event held at the end of the northern hemisphere summer and in non-Olympic years is the highlight of the international rowing calendar.

== History ==
The first event was held in Lucerne, Switzerland, in 1962. The event then was held every four years until 1974, when it became an annual competition. Also in 1974, men's lightweight and women's open weight events were added to the championships.

Initially, men's events were 2000 metres long and women's events 1000 metres. At the 1984 World Championships in Montreal, Canada, women's lightweight demonstration events were raced over a 2000-metre course for the first time. In 1985, Women's lightweight events were officially added to the schedule and all men's and women's events were contested over a 2000-metre course.

Since 1996, during (Summer) Olympic years, the World Rowing Junior Championships are held at the same time.

In 2002, adaptive rowing events were introduced for the following classes of disability: LTA (legs, trunk and arms), TA (trunk, arms), and A (arms-only). In 2009, the A category was replaced by AS (arms and shoulders), and an ID (intellectually disabled) category was added (but then removed after the 2011 Championships). From 2017, the designations AS, TA, and LTA have been changed to PR1, PR2, and PR3.

== Boats ==
Rowing takes place in 21 different boat classes, apart from during Olympic years when only non-Olympic boat classes race. National teams generally take less interest in the non-Olympic events, as the Olympic events are considered the "premier" events.

The table below shows the boat classes, "O" indicates the boat races at both the Olympics and World Championships. "WC" indicates this is only a World Championship event. After 2007, the coxed fours (4+) no longer runs as a world championship event. Similarly after 2011 the women's coxless four was no longer included, but it was reintroduced in 2013. Lightweight men's eight was removed after 2015.

As a result of the IOC's aim for gender parity, it has been agreed that for 2020 onwards the lightweight men's coxless four will be removed from the Olympics and replaced by women's coxless four.

At the 2017 FISA Ordinary Congress there were further revisions, removing M2+ and LM4- from the World Championships, and reinstating LW2-.

For the 2025 World championships further changes were made to the roster of boat classes with the removal of the LM2-, LW2-, LM4x, LW4x and the addition of the mixed 2x and mixed 8+

Boat		Men	Lwt men	Women	Lwt women
1x	Single sculls	O	WC	O	WC
2x	Double sculls	O	WC	O	WC
2-	Coxless pairs	O		O	
2+	Coxed pairs				
4x	Quad sculls	O		O	
4-	Coxless fours	O		O	
4+	Coxed fours				
8+	Eights	O		O	

== Editions ==
World Rowing Championships have been held since 1962; first every four years, then annually since 1974 (except 2020 and 2021 due to the COVID-19 pandemic).

Edition	Year	Host city	Host country	Rowing events	Pararowing events
1	1962	Lucerne	Switzerland	7	-
2	1966	Bled	Yugoslavia	7	-
3	1970	St. Catharines	Canada	7	-
4	1974	Lucerne	Switzerland	17	-
5	1975	Nottingham	Great Britain	17	-
6	1976	Villach	Austria	3	-
7	1977	Amsterdam	Netherlands	17	-
8	1978	Copenhagen	Denmark	4	-
8	1978	Cambridge	New Zealand	14	-
9	1979	Bled	Yugoslavia	18	-
10	1980	Heindonk	Belgium	4	-
11	1981	Oberschleißheim	West Germany	18	-
12	1982	Lucerne	Switzerland	18	-
13	1983	Duisburg	West Germany	18	-
14	1984	Montreal	Canada	8	-
15	1985	Heindonk	Belgium	21	-
16	1986	Nottingham	Great Britain	21	-
17	1987	Copenhagen	Denmark	21	-
18	1988	Milan	Italy	7	-
19	1989	Bled	Yugoslavia	22	-
20	1990	Tasmania	Australia	22	-
21	1991	Vienna	Austria	22	-
22	1992	Montreal	Canada	8	-
23	1993	Račice	Czech Republic	23	-
24	1994	Indianapolis	United States	23	-
25	1995	Tampere	Finland	24	-
26	1996	Motherwell	Great Britain	10	-
27	1997	Aiguebelette-le-Lac	France	24	-
28	1998	Cologne	Germany	24	-
29	1999	St. Catharines	Canada	24	-
30	2000	Zagreb	Croatia	10	-
31	2001	Lucerne	Switzerland	24	-
32	2002	Seville	Spain	24	2
33	2003	Milan	Italy	24	4
34	2004	Banyoles	Spain	9	3
35	2005	Kaizu	Japan	23	3
36	2006	Dorney	Great Britain	23	4
37	2007	Oberschleißheim	Germany	23	4
38	2008	Ottensheim	Austria	8	-
39	2009	Poznań	Poland	22	5
40	2010	Cambridge	New Zealand	22	5
41	2011	Bled	Slovenia	22	5
42	2012	Plovdiv	Bulgaria	7	-
43	2013	Chungju	South Korea	22	5
44	2014	Amsterdam	Netherlands	22	5
45	2015	Aiguebelette-le-Lac	France	22	4
46	2016	Rotterdam	Netherlands	7	1
47	2017	Sarasota	United States	21	5
48	2018	Plovdiv	Bulgaria	20	9
49	2019	Ottensheim	Austria	20	9
—N/a	~~2020~~ (Note: Cancelled due to the COVID-19 pandemic.)	~~Bled~~	~~Slovenia~~	—N/a	—N/a
—N/a	~~2021~~	~~Shanghai~~	~~China~~	—N/a	—N/a
50	2022	Račice	Czech Republic	20	9
51	2023	Belgrade	Serbia	19	8
52	2024	St. Catharines	Canada	5 (Note: Excluding Under 23 and Under 19 Championships.)	1
53	2025	Shanghai	China	18	5
54	2026	Amsterdam	Netherlands	18	5
55	2027	Lucerne	Switzerland		

== Hosts (1962–2027) ==
Times hosted	Host country
5	Canada, Switzerland
4	Germany (including West Germany), Great Britain, Netherlands
3	Austria, Yugoslavia (Note: All Yugoslav hostings were in present-day Slovenia.)
2	Belgium, Bulgaria, Czech Republic, Denmark, France, Italy, New Zealand, Spain, United States
1	Australia, Croatia, Finland, Japan, Poland, Serbia, Slovenia, South Korea, China

== Medals ==
=== Rowing (1962–2026) ===
Rank	Nation	Gold	Silver	Bronze	Total
1	Italy	95	73	56	224
2	East Germany	94	45	25	164
3	Germany	85	78	76	239
4	Great Britain	79	80	65	224
5	United States	69	79	97	245
6	New Zealand	58	36	31	125
7	Australia	47	51	49	147
8	Romania	46	47	46	139
9	Soviet Union	35	44	29	108
10	Denmark	34	27	34	95
11	France	32	47	28	107
12	Canada	28	34	45	107
13	Netherlands	26	52	48	126
14	West Germany	24	23	25	72
15	Ireland	20	10	14	44
16	China	19	12	23	54
17	Switzerland	17	16	18	51
18	Poland	15	22	18	55
19	Norway	15	7	13	35
20	Belarus	11	6	10	27
21	Greece	9	14	10	33
22	Bulgaria	9	12	14	35
23	Austria	9	7	10	26
24	Czech Republic	7	15	12	34
25	Croatia	7	6	5	18
26	Spain	6	9	16	31
27	Ukraine	5	6	10	21
28	Hungary	4	6	6	16
29	Slovenia	4	5	6	15
30	Finland	3	4	4	11
31	Lithuania	3	3	2	8
32	Mexico	3	1	2	6
33	Belgium	2	7	9	18
34	Sweden	2	4	6	12
35	South Africa	2	2	4	8
36	Russia	1	8	9	18
37	Chile	1	3	1	5
38	Japan	1	2	1	4
39	Argentina	1	1	5	7
40	Brazil	1	1	2	4
41	Serbia and Montenegro	1	1	1	3
42	Uruguay	1	1	0	2
43	Uzbekistan	1	0	0	1
44	Czechoslovakia	0	11	11	22
45	Serbia	0	3	5	8
46	Cuba	0	2	1	3
47	Estonia	0	1	6	7
48	Yugoslavia	0	1	4	5
49	Slovakia	0	1	2	3
50	Peru	0	1	1	2
50	Tunisia	0	1	1	2
52	Indonesia	0	1	0	1
52	Paraguay	0	1	0	1
54	Individual Neutral Athletes	0	0	2	2
54	Moldova	0	0	2	2
54	Turkey	0	0	2	2
57	Portugal	0	0	1	1
57	Zimbabwe	0	0	1	1
Totals (58 entries)		932	930	924	2,786

=== Pararowing (2002–2026) ===
Rank	Nation	Gold	Silver	Bronze	Total
1	Great Britain	25	9	3	37
2	Australia	16	9	10	35
3	Ukraine	14	9	9	32
4	United States	8	10	7	25
5	Netherlands	6	6	1	13
6	Norway	6	1	1	8
7	France	5	11	11	27
8	Germany	4	5	9	18
9	Brazil	4	3	2	9
10	Canada	3	3	2	8
11	Hong Kong	3	0	0	3
12	China	2	3	0	5
13	Russia	2	2	7	11
14	Ireland	2	0	1	3
15	Italy	1	12	6	19
16	Israel	1	3	5	9
17	Poland	0	3	7	10
18	Austria	0	3	0	3
19	Belarus	0	1	2	3
19	Portugal	0	1	2	3
21	Belgium	0	1	0	1
21	South Korea	0	1	0	1
21	Spain	0	1	0	1
24	Greece	0	0	1	1
24	New Zealand	0	0	1	1
24	South Africa	0	0	1	1
24	Switzerland	0	0	1	1
Totals (27 entries)		102	97	89	288

== Multiple medallists ==
Athlete	Nation	Born	Gold medal	Silver medal	Bronze medal	Tot.
Daniele Gilardoni	Italy	1976	11	1	1	13
Matthew Pinsent	Great Britain	1970	10	0	2	12
Steve Redgrave	Great Britain	1962	9	2	1	12
Franco Sancassani	Italy	1974	9	2	1	12
Francesco Esposito	Italy	1955	9	1	1	11
Giuseppe Di Capua	Italy	1958	8	3	1	12
Andrea Re	Italy	1963	8	1	2	11
Simona Radis	Romania	1999	8	1	0	9

=== Scull and sweep medalists ===
incomplete list

Scull and Sweep World Champions

Rower	Total		Scull		Sweep		Disciplines	
Rower	# of disciplines	Gold medal Silver medal Bronze medal	# of disciplines	Gold medal Silver medal Bronze medal	# of disciplines	Gold medal Silver medal Bronze medal	Scull	Sweep
(Netherlands) Michiel Bartman	3	4	1	1	2	3	M4x	M4+, M8+
(Romania) Nicoleta-Ancuța Bodnar	3	5	1	3	2	2	W2x	W4-, W8+
(Netherlands) Karolien Florijn	3	4	2	3	1	1	W1x, W4x	W4-
(Netherlands) Ronald Florijn	3	4	1	1	1	2	M2x	M4-, M8+
(Italy) Daniele Gilardoni	2	13	1	12	1	1	LM4x	LM8+
(Switzerland) Mario Gyr	2	2	1	1	1	1	LM2x	LM4-
(United Kingdom) Katherine Grainger	5	8	3	6	2	2	W1x, W2x, W4x	W2-, W8+
(Canada) Kathleen Heddle	4	5	2	3	2	2	W2x, W4x	W2-, W8+
(Romania) Elisabeta Lipă	5	13	3	9	2	4	W1x, W2x, W4x	W2-, W8+
(Canada) Marnie McBean	5	7	2	3	3	4	W2x, W4x	W2-, W4-, W8+
(Romania) Simona Radiș	4	9	1	3	3	6	W2x	W2-, W8+, mix8+
(Netherlands) Nico Rienks	2	4	1	2	1	2	M2x	M8+
(Italy) Franco Sancassani	3	12	1	10	2	2	LM4x	LM2-, LM8+
(Switzerland) Simon Schürch	2	2	1	1	1	1	LM2x	LM4-
(United Kingdom) Greg Searle	4	7	1	1	3	6	M1x	M2+, M4-, M8+
(Netherlands) Diederik Simon	2	2	1	1	1	1	M4x	M8+
(Croatia) Martin Sinković	3	9	2	6	1	3	M2x, M4x	M2-
(Croatia) Valent Sinković	3	9	2	6	1	3	M2x, M4x	M2-
(Netherlands) Olivia van Rooijen	2	3	1	3	1	1	W4x	W8-
(Netherlands) Henk-Jan Zwolle	2	3	1	1	1	2	M2x	M8+
(Germany) Michael Buchheit	3	5	1	1	2	4	LM2x	LM4-, LM8+

Martin and Valent Sinković are the first crew in rowing history that in the same composition won gold medals at World Championship in sweep and scull rowing.
