= Rowing at the 1988 Summer Olympics – Women's quadruple sculls =

Women's quadruple sculls at the Games of the XXIV Olympiad
- Date: 20–25 September 1988
- Competitors: 41 from 10 nations

Medalists
1st place, gold medalist(s)		Kerstin Förster; Kristina Mundt; Beate Schramm; Jana Sorgers	East Germany
2nd place, silver medalist(s)		Irina Kalimbet; Svitlana Maziy; Inna Frolova; Antonina Zelikovich	Soviet Union
3rd place, bronze medalist(s)		Anișoara Bălan; Anişoara Minea; Veronica Cogeanu; Elisabeta Lipă	Romania

The women's quadruple sculls competition at the 1988 Summer Olympics took place at took place at Han River Regatta Course, South Korea.

== Competition format ==
The competition consisted of two main rounds (heats and finals) as well as a repechage. The 10 boats were divided into two heats for the first round, with 5 boats in each heat. The winner of each heat (2 boats total) advanced directly to the "A" final (for 1st through 6th place). The remaining 8 boats were placed in the repechage. The repechage featured two heats, with 4 boats in each heat. The top two boats in each repechage heat (4 boats total) advanced to the "A" final. The remaining 4 boats (3rd and 4th placers in the repechage heats) were eliminated from medal contention and competed in the "B" final for 7th through 10th place.

All races were over a 2000 metre course, unlike previous Games in which women used a 1000 metre course.

== Results ==
=== Heats ===
==== Heat 1 ====
Rank	Rowers	Nation	Time	Notes
1	Galina Anakhrieva; Pavlina Khristova; Krasimira Tocheva; Iskra Velinova	Bulgaria	6:23.22	QA
2	Anișoara Bălan; Veronica Cochela; Anişoara Minea; Doina Robu	Romania	6:26.95	R
3	Inna Frolova; Irina Kalimbet; Svitlana Maziy; Antonina Zelikovich	Soviet Union	6:35.55	R
4	Hana Krejčová; Blanka Mikysková; Ľubica Novotníková-Kurhajcová; Irena Soukupová	Czechoslovakia	6:41.03	R
5	Monique Coupat; Christine Dubosquelle-Jullien; Christine Gossé; Chantal Lafon	France	6:49.29	R

==== Heat 2 ====
Rank	Rowers	Nation	Time	Notes
1	Kerstin Förster; Kristina Mundt; Beate Schramm; Jana Sorgers	East Germany	6:31.40	QA
2	Sherry Cassuto; Angie Herron; Jennie Marshall; Anne Martin	United States	6:42.93	R
3	Annelies Bredael; Lucia Focque; Ann Haesebrouck; Marie-Anne Vandermoere	Belgium	6:43.56	R
4	Jos Compaan; Marjan Pentenga; Nicolette Wessel; Marijke Zeekant	Netherlands	6:45.27	R
5	Erika Bertényi; Ildikó Cserey; Anikó Kapócs; Katalin Sarlós	Hungary	6:47.13	R

=== Repechage ===
==== Repechage heat 1 ====
Rank	Rowers	Nation	Time	Notes
1	Anișoara Bălan; Veronica Cochela; Anişoara Minea; Doina Robu	Romania	6:26.14	QA
2	Annelies Bredael; Lucia Focque; Ann Haesebrouck; Marie-Anne Vandermoere	Belgium	6:37.46	QA
3	Jos Compaan; Marjan Pentenga; Nicolette Wessel; Marijke Zeekant	Netherlands	6:38.95	QB
4	Monique Coupat; Christine Dubosquelle-Jullien; Christine Gossé; Chantal Lafon	France	6:44.15	QB

==== Repechage heat 2 ====
Rank	Rowers	Nation	Time	Notes
1	Inna Frolova; Irina Kalimbet; Svitlana Maziy; Antonina Zelikovich	Soviet Union	6:27.75	QA
2	Hana Krejčová; Blanka Mikysková; Ľubica Novotníková-Kurhajcová; Irena Soukupová	Czechoslovakia	6:33.36	QA
3	Sherry Cassuto; Angie Herron; Jennie Marshall; Anne Martin	United States	6:39.10	QB
4	Erika Bertényi; Ildikó Cserey; Anikó Kapócs; Katalin Sarlós	Hungary	6:41.24	QB

=== Finals ===
==== Final B ====
Rank	Rowers	Nation	Time
7	Jos Compaan; Marjan Pentenga; Nicolette Wessel; Marijke Zeekant	Netherlands	6:38.70
8	Erika Bertényi; Ildikó Cserey; Anikó Kapócs; Katalin Sarlós	Hungary	6:40.91
9	Sherry Cassuto; Angie Herron; Jennie Marshall; Anne Martin	United States	6:41.28
10	Monique Coupat; Christine Dubosquelle-Jullien; Christine Gossé; Chantal Lafon	France	6:43.16

==== Final A ====
Rank	Rowers	Nation	Time
1st place, gold medalist(s)	Kerstin Förster; Kristina Mundt; Beate Schramm; Jana Sorgers	East Germany	6:21.06
2nd place, silver medalist(s)	Inna Frolova; Irina Kalimbet; Svitlana Maziy; Antonina Zelikovich	Soviet Union	6:23.47
3rd place, bronze medalist(s)	Anișoara Bălan; Veronica Cochela; Elisabeta Lipă; Anişoara Minea	Romania	6:23.81
4	Galina Anakhrieva; Pavlina Khristova; Krasimira Tocheva; Iskra Velinova	Bulgaria	6:24.10
5	Hana Krejčová; Blanka Mikysková; Ľubica Novotníková-Kurhajcová; Irena Soukupová	Czechoslovakia	6:41.86
6	Annelies Bredael; Lucia Focque; Ann Haesebrouck; Marie-Anne Vandermoere	Belgium	6:43.79

== Final classification ==
Rank	Rowers	Nation
1st place, gold medalist(s)	Kerstin Förster; Kristina Mundt; Beate Schramm; Jana Sorgers	East Germany
2nd place, silver medalist(s)	Irina Kalimbet; Svitlana Maziy; Inna Frolova; Antonina Zelikovich	Soviet Union
3rd place, bronze medalist(s)	Anișoara Bălan; Anişoara Minea; Veronica Cogeanu; Doina Robu (heats)/Elisabeta Lipă (final)	Romania
4	Pavlina Khristova; Galina Anakhrieva; Iskra Velinova; Krasimira Tocheva	Bulgaria
5	Hana Krejčová; Ľubica Novotníková-Kurhajcová; Blanka Mikysková; Irena Soukupová	Czechoslovakia
6	Marie-Anne Vandermoere; Ann Haesebrouck; Lucia Focque; Annelies Bredael	Belgium
7	Jos Compaan; Marjan Pentenga; Nicolette Wessel; Marijke Zeekant	Netherlands
8	Erika Bertényi; Ildikó Cserey; Anikó Kapócs; Katalin Sarlós	Hungary
9	Sherry Cassuto; Angie Herron; Jennie Marshall; Anne Martin	United States
10	Monique Coupat; Christine Dubosquelle-Jullien; Christine Gossé; Chantal Lafon	France
