= Rowing at the 1992 Summer Olympics – Women's double sculls =

Women's double sculls at the Games of the XXV Olympiad
- Date: 27 July – 1 August 1992
- Competitors: 26 from 13 nations

Medalists
1st place, gold medalist(s)		Kerstin Köppen; Kathrin Boron	Germany
2nd place, silver medalist(s)		Veronica Cochela; Elisabeta Lipă	Romania
3rd place, bronze medalist(s)		Gu Xiaoli; Lu Huali	China

The women's double sculls competition at the 1992 Summer Olympics took place at took place at Lake of Banyoles, Spain.

== Competition format ==
The competition consisted of three main rounds (heats, semifinals, and finals) as well as a repechage. The 13 boats were divided into three heats for the first round, with 4 or 5 boats in each heat. The top three boats in each heat (9 boats total) advanced directly to the semifinals. The remaining 4 boats were placed in the repechage. The repechage featured a single heat. The top three boats in the repechage advanced to the semifinals. The slowest boat (4th place) in the repechage finished in 13th place.

The 12 semifinalist boats were divided into two heats of 6 boats each. The top three boats in each semifinal (6 boats total) advanced to the "A" final to compete for medals and 4th through 6th place; the bottom three boats in each semifinal were sent to the "B" final for 7th through 12th.

All races were over a 2000 metre course.

== Results ==
=== Heats ===
==== Heat 1 ====
Rank	Rowers	Nation	Time	Notes
1	Kerstin Köppen; Kathrin Boron	Germany	7:16.74	Q
2	Daniela Oronova; Galina Kamenova	Bulgaria	7:19.53	Q
3	Rita de Jong; Marie-José de Groot	Netherlands	7:23.59	Q
4	Cindy Ryder; Mary Mazzio	United States	7:26.73	R
5	Martha García Lourdes Montoya	Mexico	7:47.64	R

==== Heat 2 ====
Rank	Rowers	Nation	Time	Notes
1	Veronica Cochela; Elisabeta Lipă	Romania	7:16.41	Q
2	Philippa Baker; Brenda Lawson	New Zealand	7:20.49	Q
3	Jennifer Luff; Gillian Campbell	Australia	7:24.14	Q
4	Annabel Eyres; Alison Gill	Great Britain	7:31.85	R

==== Heat 3 ====
Rank	Rowers	Nation	Time	Notes
1	Gu Xiaoli; Lu Huali	China	7:27.62	Q
2	Sariya Zakyrova; Inna Frolova	Unified Team	7:34.73	Q
3	Renée Govaert; Ann Haesebrouck	Belgium	7:41.32	Q
4	Edit Punk; Anikó Kapócs	Hungary	7:47.05	R

=== Repechage ===
Rank	Rowers	Nation	Time	Notes
1	Annabel Eyres; Alison Gill	Great Britain	7:20.97	Q
2	Cindy Ryder; Mary Mazzio	United States	7:22.29	Q
3	Martha García Lourdes Montoya	Mexico	7:29.27	Q
4	Edit Punk; Anikó Kapócs	Hungary	7:43.84	

=== Semifinals ===
==== Semifinal 1 ====
Rank	Rowers	Nation	Time	Notes
1	Kerstin Köppen; Kathrin Boron	Germany	7:01.32	QA
2	Veronica Cochela; Elisabeta Lipă	Romania	7:03.92	QA
3	Sariya Zakyrova; Inna Frolova	Unified Team	7:04.78	QA
4	Jennifer Luff; Gillian Campbell	Australia	7:07.00	QB
5	Rita de Jong; Marie-José de Groot	Netherlands	7:14.90	QB
6	Martha García Lourdes Montoya	Mexico	7:42.37	QB

==== Semifinal 2 ====
Rank	Rowers	Nation	Time	Notes
1	Gu Xiaoli; Lu Huali	China	6:58.09	QA
2	Philippa Baker; Brenda Lawson	New Zealand	7:01.07	QA
3	Annabel Eyres; Alison Gill	Great Britain	7:03.89	QA
4	Daniela Oronova; Galina Kamenova	Bulgaria	7:04.02	QB
5	Renée Govaert; Ann Haesebrouck	Belgium	7:07.35	QB
6	Cindy Ryder; Mary Mazzio	United States	7:13.04	QB

=== Finals ===
==== Final B ====
Rank	Rowers	Nation	Time
7	Daniela Oronova; Galina Kamenova	Bulgaria	7:04.19
8	Jennifer Luff; Gillian Campbell	Australia	7:05.91
9	Renée Govaert; Ann Haesebrouck	Belgium	7:06.98
10	Rita de Jong; Marie-José de Groot	Netherlands	7:10.62
11	Cindy Ryder; Mary Mazzio	United States	7:12.24
12	Martha García Lourdes Montoya	Mexico	7:19.10

==== Final A ====
Rank	Rowers	Nation	Time
1st place, gold medalist(s)	Kerstin Köppen; Kathrin Boron	Germany	6:49.00
2nd place, silver medalist(s)	Veronica Cochela; Elisabeta Lipă	Romania	6:51.47
3rd place, bronze medalist(s)	Gu Xiaoli; Lu Huali	China	6:55.16
4	Philippa Baker; Brenda Lawson	New Zealand	6:56.81
5	Annabel Eyres; Alison Gill	Great Britain	7:06.62
6	Sariya Zakyrova; Inna Frolova	Unified Team	7:09.45

== Final classification ==
The following rowers took part:

Rank	Rowers	Country
1st place, gold medalist(s)	Kerstin Köppen; Kathrin Boron	Germany
2nd place, silver medalist(s)	Veronica Cochela; Elisabeta Lipă	Romania
3rd place, bronze medalist(s)	Gu Xiaoli; Lu Huali	China
	Philippa Baker; Brenda Lawson	New Zealand
	Annabel Eyres; Alison Gill	Great Britain
	Sariya Zakyrova; Inna Frolova	Unified Team
	Daniela Oronova; Galina Kamenova	Bulgaria
	Jennifer Luff; Gillian Campbell	Australia
	Renée Govaert; Ann Haesebrouck	Belgium
	Rita de Jong; Marie-José de Groot	Netherlands
	Cindy Ryder; Mary Mazzio	United States
	Martha García; Lourdes Montoya	Mexico
	Edit Punk; Anikó Kapócs	Hungary
