= Rowing at the 1992 Summer Olympics – Women's coxless four =

Women's coxless fours at the Games of the XXV Olympiad
- Venue: Lake of Banyoles
- Date: 27 July – 1 August 1992
- Competitors: 36 from 9 nations

Medalists
1st place, gold medalist(s)		Kirsten Barnes; Jessica Monroe; Brenda Taylor; Kay Worthington	Canada
2nd place, silver medalist(s)		Shelagh Donohoe; Cynthia Eckert; Carol Feeney; Amy Fuller	United States
3rd place, bronze medalist(s)		Antje Frank; Annette Hohn; Gabriele Mehl; Birte Siech	Germany

Women's coxless fours competition at the 1992 Summer Olympics in Barcelona was held between 27 July and 1 August at Lake of Banyoles. The event was an open-style, individual rowing event conducted as part of the Rowing at the 1992 Summer Olympics program.

== Schedule ==
Date	Round
Monday, 27 July 1992	Heats
Wednesday, 29 July 1992	Repechage
Saturday, 1 August 1992	Final B
Saturday, 1 August 1992	Final

== Results ==
=== Heats ===
First team of each heat qualify to the final, remainder goes to the repechage.

==== Heat 1 ====
Rank	Rowers	Country	Time	Notes
1	Kirsten Barnes; Jessica Monroe; Brenda Taylor; Kay Worthington	Canada	6:44.11	Q
2	Shelagh Donohoe; Cynthia Eckert; Carol Feeney; Amy Fuller	United States	6:46.03	R
3	Victoria Lepădatu; Iulia Bobeică; Adriana Chelariu-Bazon; Maria Pădurariu	Romania	6:48.60	R
4	Liu Xirong; He Yanwen; Cao Mianying; Zhou Shouying	China	6:51.87	R
5	Allison Barnett; Kim Thomas; Suzanne Kirk; Gillian Lindsay	Great Britain	7:05.38	R

==== Heat 2 ====
Rank	Rowers	Country	Time	Notes
1	Antje Frank; Annette Hohn; Gabriele Mehl; Birte Siech	Germany	6:49.63	Q
2	Frédérique Heligon; Chantal Lafon; Christine Dubosquelle-Jullien; Hélène Cortin	France	6:50.95	R
3	Jodie Dobson; Emmy Snook; Megan Still; Kate Slatter	Australia	6:58.34	R
4	Lalka Berberova; Mariana Yankulova; Liliya Stoyanova; Mariana Stoyanova	Bulgaria	7:11.71	R

=== Repechage ===
Top two in each heat advanced to the final.

==== Heat 1 ====
Rank	Rowers	Country	Time	Notes
1	Shelagh Donohoe; Cynthia Eckert; Carol Feeney; Amy Fuller	United States	6:48.55	Q
2	Jodie Dobson; Emmy Snook; Megan Still; Kate Slatter	Australia	6:54.16	Q
3	Lalka Berberova; Mariana Yankulova; Liliya Stoyanova; Mariana Stoyanova	Bulgaria	6:57.97	
4	Allison Barnett; Kim Thomas; Suzanne Kirk; Gillian Lindsay	Great Britain	6:59.75	

==== Heat 2 ====
Rank	Rowers	Country	Time	Notes
1	Liu Xirong; He Yanwen; Cao Mianying; Zhou Shouying	China	6:45.16	Q
2	Victoria Lepădatu; Iulia Bobeică; Adriana Chelariu-Bazon; Maria Pădurariu	Romania	6:46.94	Q
3	Frédérique Heligon; Chantal Lafon; Christine Dubosquelle-Jullien; Hélène Cortin	France	6:50.23	

=== Finals ===
==== Final B ====
Rank	Rowers	Country	Time	Notes
1	Frédérique Heligon; Chantal Lafon; Christine Dubosquelle-Jullien; Hélène Cortin	France	6:45.16	
2	Allison Barnett; Kim Thomas; Suzanne Kirk; Gillian Lindsay	Great Britain	6:49.76	
3	Lalka Berberova; Mariana Yankulova; Liliya Stoyanova; Mariana Stoyanova	Bulgaria	6:57.78	

==== Final A ====
Rank	Rowers	Country	Time	Notes
1st place, gold medalist(s)	Kirsten Barnes; Jessica Monroe; Brenda Taylor; Kay Worthington	Canada	6:30.85	
2nd place, silver medalist(s)	Shelagh Donohoe; Cynthia Eckert; Carol Feeney; Amy Fuller	United States	6:31.86	
3rd place, bronze medalist(s)	Antje Frank; Annette Hohn; Gabriele Mehl; Birte Siech	Germany	6:32.34	
4	Liu Xirong; He Yanwen; Cao Mianying; Zhou Shouying	China	6:32.50	
5	Victoria Lepădatu; Iulia Bobeică; Adriana Chelariu-Bazon; Maria Pădurariu	Romania	6:37.24	
6	Jodie Dobson; Emmy Snook; Megan Still; Kate Slatter	Australia	6:41.72	
