= Rowing at the 1992 Summer Olympics – Women's quadruple sculls =

Women's quadruple sculls at the Games of the XXV Olympiad
- Date: 28 July – 2 August 1992
- Competitors: 36 from 9 nations

Medalists
1st place, gold medalist(s)		Sybille Schmidt; Birgit Peter; Kerstin Müller; Kristina Mundt	Germany
2nd place, silver medalist(s)		Anişoara Dobre; Doina Ignat; Constanța Burcică; Veronica Cochela	Romania
3rd place, bronze medalist(s)		Antonina Zelikovich; Tetiana Ustiuzhanina; Ekaterina Karsten; Yelena Khloptseva	Unified Team

The women's quadruple sculls competition at the 1992 Summer Olympics took place at took place at Lake of Banyoles, Spain.

== Competition format ==
The competition consisted of two main rounds (heats and finals) as well as a repechage. The 9 boats were divided into two heats for the first round, with 4 or 5 boats in each heat. The first-place boat in each heat (2 boats total) advanced directly to the "A" final. The remaining 7 boats were placed in the repechage. The repechage featured two heats, with 3 or 4 boats in each heat. The top two boats in each repechage heat (4 boats total) advanced to the "A" final, while the remaining 3 boats (3rd and 4th placers in the repechage heats) were sent to the "B" final.

The boats in the "A" final competed for medals and 4th through 6th place; the boats in the "B" final competed for 7th through 9th.

All races were over a 2000-metre course.

== Results ==
=== Heats ===
==== Heat 1 ====
Rank	Rowers	Nation	Time	Notes
1	Sybille Schmidt; Birgit Peter; Kerstin Müller; Kristina Mundt	Germany	6:24.70	QA
2	Anişoara Dobre; Doina Ignat; Constanța Burcică; Veronica Cochela	Romania	6:29.58	R
3	Laurien Vermulst; Marjan Pentenga; Anita Meiland; Harriet van Ettekoven	Netherlands	6:33.84	R
4	Feng Lili; Yang Hong; Lu Huali; Gu Xiaoli	China	6:40.38	R
5	Lalka Berberova; Sevdalina Teokharova; Galina Anakhrieva; Rumyana Dzhadzharova-Neykova	Bulgaria	6:46.40	R

==== Heat 2 ====
Rank	Rowers	Nation	Time	Notes
1	Antonina Zelikovich; Tetiana Ustiuzhanina; Ekaterina Karsten; Yelena Khloptseva	Unified Team	6:30.17	QA
2	Kristine Karlson; Alison Townley; Serena Eddy-Moulton; Michelle Knox-Zaloom	United States	6:36.73	R
3	Ľubica Novotníková-Kurhajcová; Michaela Burešová-Loukotová; Hana Kafková; Irena Soukupová	Czechoslovakia	6:37.20	R
4	Berit Christoffersen; Lene Pedersen; Trine Hansen; Ulla Werner Hansen	Denmark	7:03.34	R

=== Repechage ===
==== Repechage 1 ====
Rank	Rowers	Nation	Time	Notes
1	Anişoara Dobre; Doina Ignat; Constanța Burcică; Veronica Cochela	Romania	6:37.11	QA
2	Ľubica Novotníková-Kurhajcová; Michaela Burešová-Loukotová; Hana Kafková; Irena Soukupová	Czechoslovakia	6:40.18	QA
3	Berit Christoffersen; Lene Pedersen; Trine Hansen; Ulla Werner Hansen	Denmark	6:48.76	QB
4	Lalka Berberova; Sevdalina Teokharova; Galina Anakhrieva; Rumyana Dzhadzharova-Neykova	Bulgaria	6:49.72	QB

==== Repechage 2 ====
Rank	Rowers	Nation	Time	Notes
1	Kristine Karlson; Alison Townley; Serena Eddy-Moulton; Michelle Knox-Zaloom	United States	6:30.93	QA
2	Laurien Vermulst; Marjan Pentenga; Anita Meiland; Harriet van Ettekoven	Netherlands	6:34.78	QA
3	Feng Lili; Yang Hong; Lu Huali; Gu Xiaoli	China	6:38.70	QB

=== Finals ===
==== Final B ====
Rank	Rowers	Nation	Time
7	Feng Lili; Yang Hong; Lu Huali; Gu Xiaoli	China	6:48.90
8	Berit Christoffersen; Lene Pedersen; Trine Hansen; Ulla Werner Hansen	Denmark	6:51.89
9	Lalka Berberova; Sevdalina Teokharova; Galina Anakhrieva; Rumyana Dzhadzharova-Neykova	Bulgaria	6:53.71

==== Final A ====
Rank	Rowers	Nation	Time
1st place, gold medalist(s)	Sybille Schmidt; Birgit Peter; Kerstin Müller; Kristina Mundt	Germany	6:20.18
2nd place, silver medalist(s)	Anişoara Dobre; Doina Ignat; Constanța Burcică; Veronica Cochela	Romania	6:24.34
3rd place, bronze medalist(s)	Antonina Zelikovich; Tetiana Ustiuzhanina; Ekaterina Karsten; Yelena Khloptseva	Unified Team	6:25.07
4	Laurien Vermulst; Marjan Pentenga; Anita Meiland; Harriet van Ettekoven	Netherlands	6:32.40
5	Kristine Karlson; Alison Townley; Serena Eddy-Moulton; Michelle Knox-Zaloom	United States	6:32.65
6	Ľubica Novotníková-Kurhajcová; Michaela Burešová-Loukotová; Hana Kafková; Irena Soukupová	Czechoslovakia	6:35.99

== Final classification ==
The following rowers took part:

Rank	Rowers	Country
1st place, gold medalist(s)	Sybille Schmidt; Birgit Peter; Kerstin Müller; Kristina Mundt	Germany
2nd place, silver medalist(s)	Anişoara Dobre; Doina Ignat; Constanța Burcică; Veronica Cochela	Romania
3rd place, bronze medalist(s)	Antonina Zelikovich; Tetiana Ustiuzhanina; Ekaterina Karsten; Yelena Khloptseva	Unified Team
	Laurien Vermulst; Marjan Pentenga; Anita Meiland; Harriet van Ettekoven	Netherlands
	Kristine Karlson; Alison Townley; Serena Eddy-Moulton; Michelle Knox-Zaloom	United States
	Ľubica Novotníková-Kurhajcová; Michaela Burešová-Loukotová; Hana Kafková; Irena Soukupová	Czechoslovakia
	Feng Lili; Yang Hong; Lu Huali; Gu Xiaoli	China
	Berit Christoffersen; Lene Pedersen; Trine Hansen; Ulla Werner Hansen	Denmark
	Lalka Berberova; Sevdalina Teokharova; Galina Anakhrieva; Rumyana Dzhadzharova-Neykova	Bulgaria
