= Beate Schramm =

German rower (born 1966)

Personal information
- Born: 21 June 1966 (age 60) Leisnig, Saxony, East Germany
- Height: 188 cm (6 ft 2 in)
- Weight: 77 kg (170 lb)

Sport
- Sport: Rowing
Medal record
Women's rowing
Olympic Games
Representing East Germany
Gold medal – first place	1988 Seoul	Quadruple sculls
World Rowing Championships
Representing East Germany
Gold medal – first place	1986 Nottingham	Double sculls
Gold medal – first place	1989 Bled	Double sculls
Gold medal – first place	1990 Tasmania	Double sculls
Representing Germany
Gold medal – first place	1991 Vienna	Double sculls
World Rowing Junior Championships
Representing East Germany
Gold medal – first place	1983 Vichy	Junior single sculls
Gold medal – first place	1984 Jönköping	Junior single sculls

Beate Schramm (born 21 June 1966) is a German rower and Olympic gold medallist. Between 1986 and 1991, she won four senior world championship titles, after having previously twice been junior world champion. She won gold at the 1988 Seoul Olympics in the quad sculls event for East Germany, but missed the A final at the 1992 Barcelona Olympics in the single sculls event when she competed for Germany. She was national rowing champion a total of six times; four times in East Germany and twice German champion after the reunification.

== Early life ==
Schramm was born in Leisnig, Saxony in 1966; at the time, this was in East Germany.

== Rowing career ==
=== East Germany ===
Schramm belonged to the National People's Army and was allowed to train full time. She competed for the SC Dynamo Berlin / Sportvereinigung (SV) Dynamo. Her first international appearance was at the 1983 World Rowing Junior Championships in Vichy, France, where she won the junior women's single sculls. She repeated this feat at the subsequent Junior Championships in 1984 in Jönköping, Sweden.

She had her first success as a senior at the 1986 World Rowing Championships in Nottingham, United Kingdom, where she and Sylvia Schwabe became world champion in the double sculls. In October 1986, she was awarded a Patriotic Order of Merit in gold (first class) for her sporting success.

After a disappointing fifth place at the 1987 World Rowing Championships in Copenhagen, Denmark, she terminated her partnership with Schwabe and teamed up with Kathrin Boron instead. The double scullers lost their dominant position to the team made of Birgit Peter and Martina Schröter, who went on to win the double sculls at the 1988 Summer Olympics in Seoul, South Korea. For the 1988 Olympics, Schramm instead became a member of the East German quad sculls team with Kerstin Förster, Kristina Mundt, and Jana Sorgers-Rau, and they won Olympic gold in their event.

For the 1989 World Rowing Championships in Bled, Yugoslavia, she teamed up with Sorgers-Rau in the double squad, and they won the gold medal. For the 1990 World Rowing Championships in Tasmania, Australia, Schramm once again teamed up with Boron, and they won the world championship.

Schramm also competed at the East German rowing championships. In 1983, she came second in the single sculls. In 1984, she came third in the coxed quad sculls (in subsequent years, the quad sculls were held as a coxless event). In 1985, she came second in both the single sculls and the quad sculls. In 1986, she won her first national championship (in the double sculls with Sylvia Schwabe), and she came second in both the single sculls and the quad sculls. In 1987, she came third in the quad sculls. She gained her second national title in 1988 (in the quad sculls) and also came second in the double sculls. She was national champion in the double sculls in both 1989 (with Jana Sorgers) and 1990 (with Kathrin Boron), and was also second in 1990 in the quad sculls. In total, she was thus East German national rowing champion four times.

Schramm was twice awarded Patriotic Order of Merit for her international rowing successes; first in 1986 and then in 1988.

=== Germany ===
The same team won the subsequent World Championships in 1991 in Vienna, Austria, but this time they represented Germany, as the German reunification had occurred in the meantime. At the 1992 Summer Olympics in Barcelona, Spain, Schramm competed in the single sculls event. She came fourth in the semi-final, with only the first three progressing to the A final, but was more than 16 seconds behind the third-placed rower and opted not to start in the B final.

Schramm continued to contest national championships after the reunification. In 1991, she was national champion in the double sculls (with Kathrin Boron) and in 1992, she was first in the single sculls.

== Post-rowing career ==
With the reunification of Germany, Schramm lost her army privileges and took on a half-time role as an economist with the Ministry of Finance of the federated state of Brandenburg. From 2004 to 2005, she was running the restaurant of the rowing club in Mainz. As of 2007, she worked as a criminal officer for the Police.
