= Rowing at the 1992 Summer Olympics – Women's single sculls =

Women's single sculls at the Games of the XXV Olympiad
- Date: 28 July – 2 August 1992
- Competitors: 15 from 15 nations

Medalists
1st place, gold medalist(s)		Elisabeta Lipă	Romania
2nd place, silver medalist(s)		Annelies Bredael	Belgium
3rd place, bronze medalist(s)		Silken Laumann	Canada

The women's single sculls competition at the 1992 Summer Olympics took place at took place at Lake of Banyoles, Spain.

== Competition format ==
The competition consisted of three main rounds (heats, semifinals, and finals) as well as a repechage. The 15 boats were divided into three heats for the first round, with 5 boats in each heat. The top three boats in each heat (9 boats total) advanced directly to the semifinals. The remaining 6 boats were placed in the repechage. The repechage featured a single heat. The top three boats in the repechage advanced to the main semifinals. The remaining three boats (4th through 6th in the repechage) were placed in the "C" final to compete for 13th through 15th places.

The 12 semifinalist boats were divided into two heats of 6 boats each. The top three boats in each semifinal (6 boats total) advanced to the "A" final to compete for medals and 4th through 6th place; the bottom three boats in each semifinal were sent to the "B" final for 7th through 12th.

All races were over a 2000 metre course.

== Results ==
=== Heats ===
==== Heat 1 ====
Rank	Rower	Nation	Time	Notes
1	Anne Marden	United States	7:40.12	Q
2	Silken Laumann	Canada	7:46.16	Q
3	Tonia Svaier	Greece	7:51.35	Q
4	Patricia Reid	Great Britain	8:00.64	R
5	Violeta Ninova-Yordanova	Bulgaria	8:08.43	R

==== Heat 2 ====
Rank	Rower	Nation	Time	Notes
1	Annelies Bredael	Belgium	7:50.02	Q
2	Corinne Le Moal	France	7:50.96	Q
3	Beate Schramm	Germany	8:00.81	Q
4	Kristina Poplavskaja	Lithuania	8:06.31	R
5	Ho Kim Fai	Hong Kong	8:13.19	R

==== Heat 3 ====
Rank	Rower	Nation	Time	Notes
1	Elisabeta Lipă	Romania	7:42.94	Q
2	Maria Brandin	Sweden	7:47.01	Q
3	Irene Eijs	Netherlands	7:52.13	Q
4	Andrea Coss	Australia	7:58.51	R
5	Katalin Sarlós	Hungary	8:00.45	R

=== Repechage ===
Rank	Rower	Nation	Time	Notes
1	Violeta Ninova-Yordanova	Bulgaria	7:58.70	Q
2	Patricia Reid	Great Britain	7:59.53	Q
3	Kristina Poplavskaja	Lithuania	8:01.31	Q
4	Katalin Sarlós	Hungary	8:05.17	QC
5	Ho Kim Fai	Hong Kong	8:14.63	QC
–	Andrea Coss	Australia	DNF	QC

=== Semifinals ===
==== Semifinal 1 ====
Rank	Rower	Nation	Time	Notes
1	Elisabeta Lipă	Romania	7:31.71	QA
2	Anne Marden	United States	7:35.72	QA
3	Corinne Le Moal	France	7:39.78	QA
4	Irene Eijs	Netherlands	7:40.44	QB
5	Tonia Svaier	Greece	7:42.77	QB
6	Patricia Reid	Great Britain	7:44.36	QB

==== Semifinal 2 ====
Rank	Rower	Nation	Time	Notes
1	Silken Laumann	Canada	7:30.48	QA
2	Annelies Bredael	Belgium	7:33.97	QA
3	Maria Brandin	Sweden	7:36.88	QA
4	Beate Schramm	Germany	7:53.22	QB
5	Violeta Ninova-Yordanova	Bulgaria	8:01.15	QB
6	Kristina Poplavskaja	Lithuania	8:05.15	QB

=== Finals ===
==== Final C ====
Rank	Rower	Nation	Time
13	Katalin Sarlós	Hungary	8:11.55
14	Andrea Coss	Australia	8:13.46
15	Ho Kim Fai	Hong Kong	8:32.86

==== Final B ====
Rank	Rower	Nation	Time
7	Tonia Svaier	Greece	8:06.65
8	Irene Eijs	Netherlands	8:09.62
9	Patricia Reid	Great Britain	8:13.05
10	Violeta Ninova-Yordanova	Bulgaria	8:16.22
11	Kristina Poplavskaja	Lithuania	8:27.84
12	Beate Schramm	Germany	DNS

==== Final A ====
Rank	Rower	Nation	Time
1st place, gold medalist(s)	Elisabeta Lipă	Romania	7:25.54
2nd place, silver medalist(s)	Annelies Bredael	Belgium	7:26.64
3rd place, bronze medalist(s)	Silken Laumann	Canada	7:28.85
4	Anne Marden	United States	7:29.84
5	Maria Brandin	Sweden	7:37.55
6	Corinne Le Moal	France	7:41.85

== Final classification ==
The following rowers took part:

Rank	Rowers	Country
1st place, gold medalist(s)	Elisabeta Lipă	Romania
2nd place, silver medalist(s)	Annelies Bredael	Belgium
3rd place, bronze medalist(s)	Silken Laumann	Canada
	Anne Marden	United States
	Maria Brandin	Sweden
	Corinne Le Moal	France
	Tonia Svaier	Greece
	Irene Eijs	Netherlands
	Patricia Reid	Great Britain
	Violeta Ninova-Yordanova	Bulgaria
	Kristina Poplavskaja	Lithuania
	Beate Schramm	Germany
	Katalin Sarlós	Hungary
	Andrea Coss	Australia
	Ho Kim Fai	Hong Kong
