= Renée Slegers =

Dutch footballer and coach (born 1989)

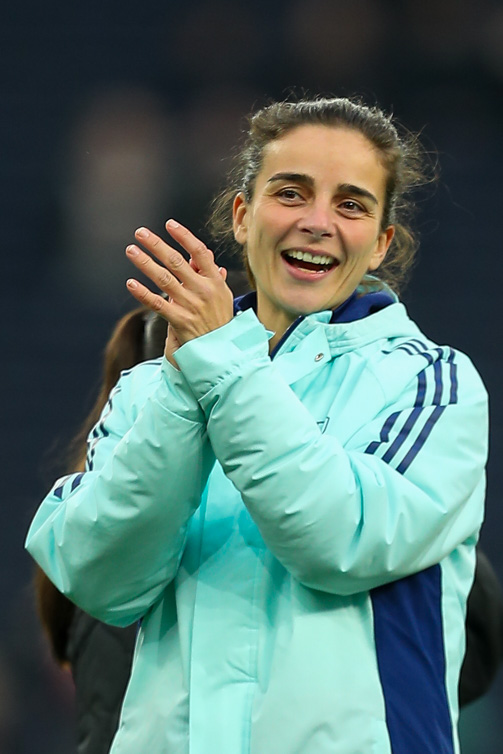
- Slegers in 2024

Personal information
- Full name: Renée Josiena Anna Slegers
- Date of birth: 5 February 1989 (age 37)
- Place of birth: Someren-Eind, Netherlands
- Height: 1.63 m (5 ft 4 in)
- Position: Midfielder

Team information
- Current team: Arsenal (head coach)

Youth career
- 1997–2006: SSE
- 2006–2007: Arsenal

Senior career*
Years	Team	Apps	(Gls)
2007–2011	Willem II	20	(7)
2011–2012	Djurgårdens IF	33	(4)
2013–2016	Linköping FC	58	(8)

International career^{‡}
2004	Netherlands U15	2	(0)
2005	Netherlands U17	4	(0)
2006–2008	Netherlands U19	30	(3)
2009–2016	Netherlands	55	(15)

Managerial career
- 2018–2020: IF Limhamn Bunkeflo
- 2021: Sweden U23
- 2021–2023: FC Rosengård
- 2024–2025: Arsenal (interim)
- 2025–: Arsenal
- * Club domestic league appearances and goals as of 15 December 2018 ‡ National team caps and goals as of 15 December 2018

Renée Josiena Anna Slegers (Dutch: [rəˈneː joːˈsinaː ˈʔɑnaː ˈsleːɣərs]; born 5 February 1989) is a Dutch football coach and former player, who is currently the head coach of Women's Super League club Arsenal.

Slegers played as a midfielder, representing Willem II, as well as Swedish Damallsvenskan clubs Djurgårdens IF and Linköping FC. She won 55 caps for the Netherlands women's national football team and appeared at UEFA Women's Euro 2013. After her retirement, Slegers began coaching in Sweden and spent two seasons as head coach of FC Rosengård. She then joined Arsenal in September 2023, serving as assistant coach under Jonas Eidevall, and became the interim coach in October 2024, following Eidevall's resignation. In January 2025, Slegers was permanently named head coach of Arsenal, signing a contract until the end of the 2025–26 season. Five months after that, she guided them into the 2024–25 UEFA Women's Champions League trophy.

== Club career ==
=== Youth career ===
Slegers started her youth career with local Someren side SSE. In 2006, she moved to England to join Arsenal’s youth academy for the 2006/07 season. She lived and studied at Oaklands College while training with the Arsenal Ladies, where she was coached by Emma Hayes and Kelly Smith. On 24 January 2007, Slegers made a substitute appearance in the quarter-final of the London County Cup, as Arsenal defeated West Ham United 4–0.

=== Professional career ===
In 2007, Slegers returned to the Netherlands to begin her senior career with Willem II in the inaugural season of the Eredivisie Vrouwen. She remained with the club for four seasons and finished as their top scorer in the 2009–10 season, recording five goals in 11 appearances.

In January 2011, she moved to Sweden to sign her first full-time professional contract with Djurgårdens IF. Slegers represented the Damallsvenskan side for two seasons, making 33 appearances and scoring four goals before departing the club following their relegation to the Elitettan in 2012.

Slegers moved to Linköping FC in January 2013, stating a desire to prove herself in the Damallsvenskan after injuries impacted her time at Djurgårdens. At Linköping, she won two Svenska Cupen trophies and the 2016 Damallsvenskan title.

Slegers’ playing career ended following an anterior cruciate ligament (ACL) injury sustained on 29 November 2016 while on international duty. After a period of rehabilitation, she formally announced her retirement on 24 February 2018.

== International career ==
On 5 March 2009, Slegers debuted for the senior Netherlands women's national football team, against Russia in the Cyprus Women's Cup. She was not selected in the squad for UEFA Women's Euro 2009, where the Netherlands reached the semi-finals, but was placed on standby in the event of injuries.

In June 2013, national team coach Roger Reijners selected Slegers for the Netherlands squad for UEFA Women's Euro 2013 in Sweden. She started all three group stage matches against Germany, Norway, and Iceland. In a 2015 World Cup qualification match on 10 April 2014, Slegers scored five goals in a 10–1 victory over Albania, which included a hat-trick scored in four minutes.

In 2015, Slegers missed the 2015 FIFA Women's World Cup in Canada due to a pelvic injury that kept her out of competitive football for a year and a half. In March 2016, national team coach Arjan van der Laan selected Slegers for the Netherlands squad for the 2016 UEFA Women's Olympic Qualifying Tournament, in which she appeared for the Netherlands in the games against Norway and Sweden.

On 29 November 2016, Slegers made her final appearance in a 0–1 home friendly defeat to England at the Koning Willem II Stadion, where she sustained an ACL injury. She was subsequently ruled out of UEFA Women's Euro 2017, which the Netherlands hosted and won. Slegers later announced her retirement on 24 February 2018. She ended her international career with 55 caps and 15 goals.

== Managerial and coaching career ==
=== Early career (2018–2021) ===
Slegers coached IF Limhamn Bunkeflo's under-19 team in the 2018 season, leading the team to win the Swedish U19 Women's Championship. She was promoted to head coach of the A-team in November 2018, ahead of the 2019 season. The club finished the 2019 Damallsvenskan season with 14 points, placing 11th in the table, and were relegated to the Elitettan on goal difference. In February 2020, the club withdrew from the Elitettan due to financial difficulties.

During the 2019 FIFA Women's World Cup in France, Slegers worked as a scout for the Netherlands national team. Slegers participated in the 2019-21 UEFA Coach Mentor Programme, where she was mentored by then-Arsenal head coach Joe Montemurro. As part of the programme, she undertook a study visit to Arsenal.

In July 2020, Slegers was appointed joint head coach of FC Rosengård 1917 (the club's "B" team) alongside Elena Sadiku. The pair led the team to the 2020 Division 2 Södra Götaland title, securing promotion to Division 1. On 19 March 2021, Slegers was announced as the new head coach of Sweden women's under-23 national team, a role she held concurrently with her position at Rosengård. Following a training camp in June 2021, which involved a win over Finland and a draw against France, she resigned to take over the FC Rosengård senior team.

=== FC Rosengård (2021–2023) ===
On 28 June 2021, Slegers was appointed head coach of FC Rosengård, succeeding Jonas Eidevall mid-way through the season. She led the club to the 2021 Damallsvenskan title and a 2021-22 Svenska Cupen victory, defeating BK Häcken FF 2–1 in the final on 26 May 2022. She led Rosengård to a second consecutive Damallsvenskan title in 2022, her first full season in charge. On 17 April 2023, Slegers departed the club by mutual consent after the team recorded one point from the opening three matches of the season.

=== Arsenal (2023–present) ===
In September 2023, Slegers joined Arsenal as an assistant coach under Jonas Eidevall. Focused on individual player development, Slegers worked with members of the squad to refine their technical and tactical performance. Defender Lotte Wubben-Moy credited Slegers with helping her develop key areas of her game, specifically her body positioning and aggression.

On 15 October 2024, following Eidevall's resignation as head coach, Slegers took over as interim head coach. During her interim tenure, she led the team to an eleven-match unbeaten run, consisting of ten wins and one draw. Five consecutive group stage victories saw Arsenal qualify for the Women's Champions League quarter-finals as group winners.

On 17 January 2025, Slegers was appointed head coach on a permanent basis, signing a one-and-a-half-year contract. On 24 May 2025, she led Arsenal to their second UEFA Women's Champions League title, defeating FC Barcelona Femení 1–0 in the final. The victory made Slegers the first Dutch manager to win the competition, ending the club's 18-year wait for a second European title.

On 9 January 2026, it was announced that Slegers had signed a three-year deal until 2029. On 1 February 2026, Slegers guided Arsenal to victory in the inaugural FIFA Women's Champions Cup final, defeating Corinthians 3–2 after extra time to become the first Intercontinental Club Champions.

== Personal life ==
Slegers was born and raised in Someren-Eind, a village in the southeastern part of North Brabant, Netherlands. Growing up alongside two younger brothers, she was inspired to take up football after watching them play, subsequently participating in both boys' and mixed-gender youth teams. She later studied communication sciences and practical philosophy at university.

At the age of 22, Slegers moved to Sweden to play in the Damallsvenskan. She spent 12 years in the country as both a player and a manager, and has stated that she feels "half-Swedish".

Slegers has two children with her partner and former Linköping FC defender, Maja Krantz.

== Career statistics ==
Scores and results list the Netherlands goal tally first.

Goal	Date	Venue	Opponent	Score	Result	Competition
1.	21 November 2009	Kyocera Stadion, The Hague, Netherlands	Belarus	1–0	1–1	2011 FIFA Women's World Cup qualification
2.	22 April 2010	Milano Arena, Kumanovo, Macedonia	North Macedonia	7–0	7–0	2011 FIFA Women's World Cup qualification
3.	13 June 2010	MAC³PARK Stadion, Zwolle, Netherlands	Belgium	4–1	4–1	Friendly
4.	2 March 2011	GSP Stadium, Nicosia, Cyprus	New Zealand	4–1	4–1	2011 Cyprus Cup
5.	4 March 2011	Ammochostos Stadium, Larnaca, Cyprus	France	1–0	2–1	2011 Cyprus Cup
6.	26 September 2013	Qemal Stafa Stadium, Tirana, Albania	Albania	4–0	4–0	2015 FIFA Women's World Cup qualification
7.	26 October 2013	Estádio José de Carvalho, Maia, Portugal	Portugal	1–0	7–0	2015 FIFA Women's World Cup qualification
8.	26 October 2013	Estádio José de Carvalho, Maia, Portugal	Portugal	2–0	7–0	2015 FIFA Women's World Cup qualification
9.	10 April 2014	Stadion De Braak, Helmond, Netherlands	Albania	2–0	10–1	2015 FIFA Women's World Cup qualification
10.	10 April 2014	Stadion De Braak, Helmond, Netherlands	Albania	3–0	10–1	2015 FIFA Women's World Cup qualification
11.	10 April 2014	Stadion De Braak, Helmond, Netherlands	Albania	4–0	10–1	2015 FIFA Women's World Cup qualification
12.	10 April 2014	Stadion De Braak, Helmond, Netherlands	Albania	7–1	10–1	2015 FIFA Women's World Cup qualification
13.	10 April 2014	Stadion De Braak, Helmond, Netherlands	Albania	10–1	10–1	2015 FIFA Women's World Cup qualification
14.	7 May 2014	Den Dreef, Leuven, Belgium	Belgium	2–0	2–0	2015 FIFA Women's World Cup qualification
15.	20 October 2016	Tony Macaroni Arena, Livingston, Scotland	Scotland	4–0	7–0	Friendly

== Managerial statistics ==
As of 22 November 2026

Managerial record by team and tenure
Team	From	To	Record								Ref
Team	From	To	P	W	D	L	GF	GA	GD	Win %	Ref
IF Limhamn Bunkeflo	1 January 2019	22 January 2020	22	3	5	14	16	46	−30	13.64	
FC Rosengård	28 June 2021	17 April 2023	59	38	8	13	145	66	+79	64.41	
Arsenal	15 October 2024	Present	90	58	15	17	204	82	+122	64.44	
Career total			171	99	28	44	365	194	+171	57.89	

== Honours ==
=== Player ===
Linköping FC

- Damallsvenskan: 2016
- Svenska Cupen: 2013–14, 2014–15

=== Manager ===
FC Rosengård

- Damallsvenskan: 2021, 2022
- Svenska Cupen: 2021–22

Arsenal WFC

- UEFA Women's Champions League: 2024–25
- FIFA Women's Champions Cup: 2026

Individual

- FA WSL Manager of the Month: December 2024, February 2025, March 2025, March 2026
- The Best FIFA Women's Coach finalist: 2025
- Ballon d'Or Women's Coach of the Year nominee: 2025
- LMA John Duncan Award: 2025
- IFFHS World's Best Women's Club Coach: 2025
