= Hong Yan =

Hong Yan may refer to:

- Yan Hong (disambiguation), Chinese people with the surname Yan
- Hongyan (disambiguation)
