= Paul Rowe (rower) =

Australian rower and coach

Paul Francis Rowe
Personal information
- Born: 22 February 1948
- Died: 25 July 2015 (aged 67) Queanbeyan, NSW
- Occupation: Rowing coach

Sport
- Sport: Rowing
- Club: Haberfield Rowing Club; Daramalan RC (coach)

Achievements and titles
- National finals: President's Cup 1974 & 75

Paul Francis Rowe (22 February 1948 - 25 July 2015) was an Australian representative rower and elite level rowing coach. He was an eight-time Australian national champion in both sweep oared and sculling boats across both lightweight and open divisions. He was Australia's lightweight sculling representative at the 1975 World Rowing Championships. He coached scullers and crews to three Australia national title wins and to world championships and to Commonwealth and Olympic Games.

== Early life and first rowing ==
Rowe was born in Bulli, New South Wales and grew up in Young, New South Wales. He was the second son and the third of eight children of Dr Charles Rowe, a GP and his wife June. He was educated at St Joseph's College, Hunters Hill but did not row at the school. He attended St John's College, University of Sydney and took up rowing for the Sydney University Boat Club in 1968. His first race was at the 1968 Australian University Championships in a four coxed by future sporting administration great John Boultbee. They won the Intervarsity lightweight four championship.

== Club and state rowing ==
Rowe joined the UTS Haberfield Rowing Club and made sculling his daily commute up the Parramatta River to Ryde where he worked for Howard Croker who manufactured oars. At the 1971 Australian University Championships he raced the single scull event for the University of New South Wales That same year he won the New South Wales state junior sculling title.

Rowe first came into state representative contention in 1970 when having only been rowing for two years he was selected as a reserve for the New South Wales lightweight four to contest the Penrith Cup at the 1970 Interstate Regatta. In 1974 and in 1975 he was the New South Wales selected single sculler to contest the President's Cup at the Interstate Regatta within the Australian Rowing Championships. He placed second both times.

In Haberfield colours Rowe had great success at all five Australian Rowing Championships he contested between 1972 and 1977. In 1972 he raced the lightweight pair, lightweight coxless four and the lightweight eight national title in Haberfield crews and won the lightweight four title. From 1974 he focussed on sculling and he won all seven national sculling championship titles he contested between 1974 and 1977 including three national championship victories in the single year of 1975. He won the men's lightweight single scull and lightweight double sculls titles in 1975. He won the national men's heavyweight double-scull title on three occasions - with Haberfield's Dick Reddell in 1974; with Ted Hale from Sydney Rowing Club in 1976; and with his own younger brother Charlie in 1977. He twice won the national title in a quad scull (1975 and 1977) - both crews included Reddell and the 1977 quad was crewed by his brother Charlie Rowe.

== International representative rowing ==
In 1975 Rowe was selected as Australia's lightweight sculler to race at the World Rowing Championships in Nottingham. He won his heat, came second in his semi and then finished sixth in the A final.

== Rowing coach ==
After retiring from competition Rowe worked in Europe for Melchior Bürgin and his Stämpfli Racing Boats business. Rowe started coaching at the St George Rowing Club in Sydney in the 1980s. He took Tim McLaren, a St George sculler in 1983 and a St George lightweight double scull in 1985 both to the Australian Championships. He was coach of both Australian U23 lightweight men's scullers selected for the 1984 Trans Tasman series.

He accepted a posting to the AIS as a scholarship coach in 1985. He took an ACT lightweight pair to a national title win in 1986; coached Gordon Marcks a Canberra Rowing Club sculler to the Australian Championships in 1987 and an ANU lightweight pair to second place in their national title attempt in 1988. During this time he took ACT oarsmen to New South Wales state representation - Ron Smith in the single sculls in 1985 and then all three New South Wales lightweight men's fours from 1986 to 1988. The 1987 New South Wales four of all ACT oarsmen won the Penrith Cup (the Interstate Championship title) at that year's Interstate Regatta.

He was the AIS' head sculling coach from 1990 to 1994 taking Australian scullers to World Rowing Championships in 1991, 1993 and 1994. He was a long-time coach of Haberfield's Jennifer Luff starting with her 1990 and 1991 campaigns as the selected New South Wales single sculler for the interstate title (the Nell Slatter Trophy which she won in 1991). In 1991 he also coached the West Australian state sculler Andrea Coss. He took Luff and Gillian Campbell in a women's double scull to the 1990 and 1991 World Rowing Championships and then the 1992 Barcelona Olympics. In 1993 he coached Luff and Marina Hatzakis in the double as well as the single sculler Emmy Snook to the 1993 World Rowing Championships.

He coached the South Australian sculler Alistair McLachlan in his 1992 and 1993 President's Cup campaigns. In 1994 he coached the veteran Victorian sculler Peter Antonie when at the end of his career Antonie was selected with Canberra's Nick McDonald-Crowley to row the double-scull at the 1994 World Rowing Championships and the 1994 Commonwealth Rowing Championships where they won a silver medal. Rowe had success as the coach of Australian U23 scullers in the Trans Tasman series with the 1992 pairing of Duncan Free and Craig Jones and the 1994 combination of Ralph Cruickshank and Matthew Cordery. Both crews won all of their match races in each of those series against New Zealand crews.

== Personal ==
During his AIS and representative coaching years and for the rest of his life he lived in the Australian Capital Territory or at Queanbeyan. He had a community involvement in the Daramalan Rowing Club. He died in 2015 after battling dementia.
