= Shelagh Donohoe =

American rower

Personal information
- Born: January 22, 1965 (age 61) Lowell, Massachusetts, U.S.
- Education: University of Massachusetts Lowell (B.A.,1988)
Medal record
Women's rowing
Representing United States
Olympic Games
Silver medal – second place	1992 Barcelona	Coxless fours

Shelagh Donohoe (born January 22, 1965) is an American Olympic rower.

== Early years ==
Shelagh was born in Lowell, Massachusetts, and attended Keith Hall, now a part of Lowell Catholic High School, from 1981 to 1985.

She later attended the University of Massachusetts-Lowell from 1984 to 1988, and graduated with a B.A. in Business Administration. She was on the Varsity rowing team all four years, and in 1987, her team won Bronze at the Varsity Four at the Dad Vail Regatta in Philadelphia.

== Rowing career ==
1989–1992, Donohoe was a member of the U.S. National Rowing Team with the following achievements:

- 1989 Bled, Yugoslavia World Championships.
- 1990 Tasmania, Australia, World Championships. Silver Medal (women's Eight).
- 1991 Vienna, Austria, World Championships. Silver Medal (Coxless Fours).
- 1992 Barcelona, Spain, Summer Olympics. Silver Medal (Coxless) Fours).

When Donohoe, with teammates; Cindy Ekert, Carol Feeney, and Amy Fuller, won the Silver in Barcelona, the August 2, 1992 Boston Globe article by John Powers reported:

BANYOLES, Spain -- Bobbing up and down at the finish, depleted and gasping, Shelagh Donohoe had no idea where her boat had finished.

"I didn't know if we were first -- or fourth," the Lowell, Mass., oarswoman said yesterday morning, an Olympic silver medal around her neck. "They told us it was a photo finish."

The photo was for third, between the Germans and the Chinese. There was no question about second. Donohoe and her mates in the US straight four had it nailed down from the start, when they latched onto world champion Canada and stayed within a quarter-length all the way…

== Coaching career ==
- 1994, coached the U.S. Junior Women's National Team.
- 1994–1996, assistant coach at Boston University and Harvard University.
- 1996 Selected to attend the NCAA Women Coaches Academy.

From 1996 to 2006, Shelagh coached at the Northeastern University. With the following achievements:

- 2004, New England Assistant Coach of the Year.

Since 2006, Donohoe has been head coach of the University of Rhode Island women's rowing. With the following achievements:

- 2007, Atlantic 10 Coach of the year.
- 2008, Atlantic 10 championship & coach of the year.
- 2010, Atlantic 10 championship & coach of the year.

== Honors ==
- Shelagh was inducted into the U-Mass Lowell's Athletics Hall of Fame, 1993.
- Shelagh was inducted into the Lowell catholic High School Athletics Hall of Fame.
