= Allison Barnett =

Allison Barnett may refer to:

- Allison Barnett (rower) (born 1966), British rower
- Allison J. Barnett (1892–1971), officer in the United States Army
