= Coss (surname) =

Coss is a surname. Notable people with the surname include:

- Andrea Coss (born 1960), Australian rower
- David Coss, American politician and civil servant
- Emma Coss – English footballer (born in 1979)
- Eric Coss – American football player (born 1963)
- Gabriel Coss, music video director
- Peter Coss (born 1946), British historian
- Roxy Coss, American saxophonist and composer
