= Monique Coupat =

French rower

Personal information
- Nationality: French
- Born: 16 April 1955 (age 69)

Sport
- Sport: Rowing

Monique Coupat (born 16 April 1955) is a French rower. She competed in the women's quadruple sculls event at the 1988 Summer Olympics.
