= Corinne Le Moal =

French rower

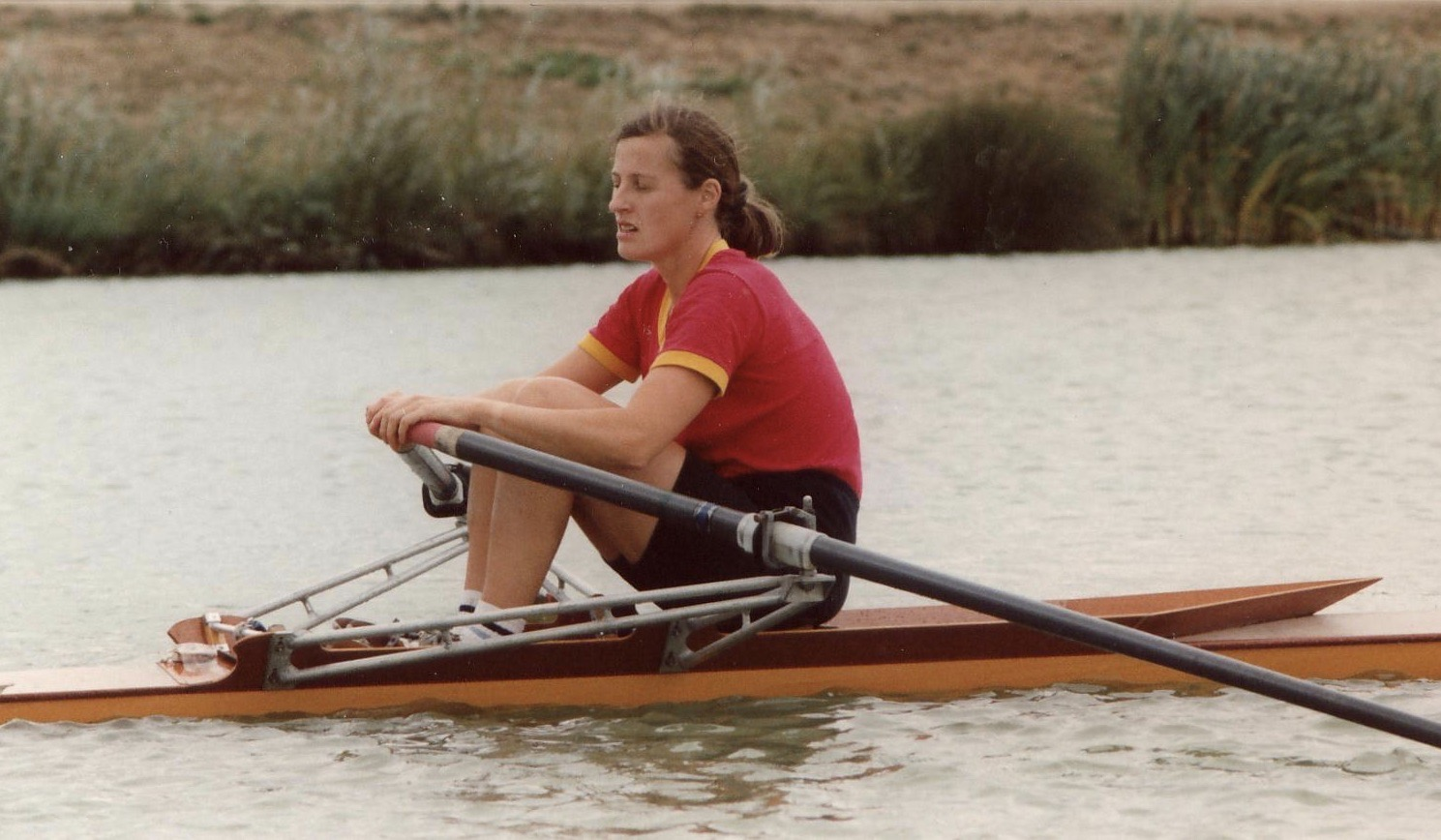

Personal information
- Nationality: French
- Born: 10 November 1954 (age 70); Étrépagny, France

Sport
- Sport: Rowing

Corinne Le Moal (born 10 November 1954) is a French rower. She competed in the women's single sculls event at the 1992 Summer Olympics.
