= Sherry Cassuto =

American rower

Personal information
- Nationality: American
- Born: January 24, 1957 Brooklyn, New York, United States
- Died: April 29, 2016 (aged 59) Seattle, Washington, United States

Sport
- Sport: Rowing

Sherry Cassuto (January 24, 1957 – April 29, 2016) was an American rower. She competed in the women's quadruple sculls event at the 1988 Summer Olympics.

At the 1989 Maccabiah Games in Israel, Cassuto won the single sculls crew event.

She was a lesbian.
