= Lucia Focque =

Belgian rower

Personal information
- Nationality: Belgian
- Born: 30 March 1964 (age 60); Willebroek, Belgium

Sport
- Sport: Rowing

Lucia Focque (born on 30 March 1964) is a Belgian rower. She competed in the women's quadruple sculls event at the 1988 Summer Olympics.
