= Erzsébet Stephens-Sarlós =

Hungarian athlete, researcher and university lecturer

Elizabeth Stephens-Sarlós (born December 6, 1965, in Budapest) is a Hungarian rower, researcher, and university lecturer. She won a bronze medal in the women's coxed four event at the 1984 Friendship Games. Since 2026, she has served as a Senior Research Fellow at the Faculty of Health and Sport Sciences, Széchenyi István University, where she is engaged in teaching and research.

== Early life ==
Elizabeth Stephens-Sarlós was born in Budapest on December 6, 1965. Her father, György Sarlós, was an Olympic silver medalist rower in the coxless four event at the 1968 Summer Olympics. Her sister, Katalin Sarlós, competed at the 1988 Summer Olympics and the 1992 Summer Olympics.

== Academic career ==
Following her athletic career, she turned to scientific and academic work. Since 2026, she has served as a Senior Research Fellow at the Faculty of Health and Sport Sciences, Széchenyi István University, where she carries out teaching and research duties.

In 2025, she received the Arany Fokozatú Oktatási Innovációs Díj (Gold Level Educational Innovation Award), a Hungarian award from the OTP Fáy Foundation for the programme Success in Motion – Playful Sensorimotor Training.

In 2023, her book The Stephens-Sarlós Program: Rewiring the Brain using Sensorimotor Exercises was published.
