= Blanka Mikysková =

Czech rower (born 1963)

Personal information
- Nationality: Czech
- Born: 28 October 1963 (age 61); Valtice, Czechoslovakia

Sport
- Sport: Rowing

Blanka Mikysková (born 28 October 1963) is a Czech rower. She competed in the women's quadruple sculls event at the 1988 Summer Olympics.
