= Anișoara Sorohan =

Romanian rower

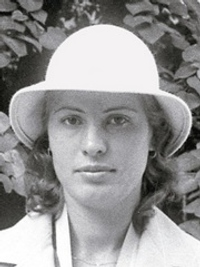

Personal information
- Born: 9 February 1963 (age 63) Târgu Frumos, Romania
- Height: 177 cm (5 ft 10 in)
- Weight: 69 kg (152 lb)

Sport
- Sport: Rowing
- Club: Steaua Bucuresti
Medal record
Representing Romania
Olympic Games
Gold medal – first place	1984 Los Angeles	Quadruple sculls
Bronze medal – third place	1988 Seoul	Quadruple sculls
World Rowing Championships
Silver medal – second place	1986 Nottingham	Quadruple sculls
Bronze medal – third place	1985 Hazewinkel	Quadruple sculls
Summer Universiade
Gold medal – first place	1987 Zagreb	Quadruple sculls

Anișoara Sorohan (later Minea, born 9 February 1963) is a retired Romanian rower. Competing in quadruple sculls she won two Olympic and two World Championship medals between 1984 and 1988.
