= Ildikó Cserey =

Hungarian rower

Personal information
- Nationality: Hungarian
- Born: 30 November 1962 (age 62); Budapest, Hungary

Sport
- Sport: Rowing

Ildikó Cserey (born 30 November 1962) is a Hungarian rower. She competed in the women's quadruple sculls event at the 1988 Summer Olympics.
