= Yang Hong =

Yang Hong may refer to:

- Yang Hong (scholar) (陽鴻), Eastern Han dynasty scholar
- Yang Hong (楊弘), an official serving under the Eastern Han dynasty warlord Yuan Shu
- Yang Hong (Shu Han) (楊洪), official of the Shu Han state in the Three Kingdoms period
- Yang Hong (rower) (born 1971), Chinese Olympic rower
- Yang Hong (swimmer) (born 2000), Chinese Paralympic swimmer
