= Edit Punk =

Hungarian rower

Personal information
- Nationality: Hungarian
- Born: 6 May 1967 (age 57); Budapest, Hungary

Sport
- Sport: Rowing

Edit Punk (born 6 May 1967) is a Hungarian rower. She competed in the women's double sculls event at the 1992 Summer Olympics.
