= Pavlina Khristova =

Bulgarian rower

Personal information
- Nationality: Bulgarian
- Born: 6 October 1968 (age 56); Targovishte, Bulgaria

Sport
- Sport: Rowing

Pavlina Khristova (born 6 October 1968) is a Bulgarian rower. She competed in the women's quadruple sculls event at the 1988 Summer Olympics.
