= Jennie Marshall =

American rower

Personal information
- Born: December 21, 1960 (age 64); Cooperstown, New York, United States

Sport
- Sport: Rowing

Jennie Marshall (born December 21, 1960) is an American rower. She competed in the women's quadruple sculls event at the 1988 Summer Olympics.
