= György Sarlós =

Hungarian rower

Personal information
- Born: 29 July 1940 (age 85) Budakeszi, Kingdom of Hungary

Sport
- Sport: Rowing
Medal record
Representing Hungary
Men's rowing
Silver medal – second place	1968 Mexico City	Coxless four
European Rowing Championships
Silver medal – second place	1967 Vichy	Coxless four
Silver medal – second place	1969 Klagenfurt	Coxless four

György Sarlós (born 29 July 1940) is a Hungarian rower who competed in the 1960 Summer Olympics, in the 1968 Summer Olympics, and in the 1972 Summer Olympics.

== Early life and family ==
He was born in Budakeszi.

His daughter, Katalin Sarlós, competed at the 1988 Summer Olympics and the 1992 Summer Olympics. His daughter Erzsébet Stephens-Sarlós won a bronze medal in the women's coxed four event at the 1984 Friendship Games.

== Rowing ==
In 1960 he was a crew member of the Hungarian boat which was eliminated in the repechage of the coxless four event.

Eight years later at the 1968 Games in Mexico City he won the silver medal with the Hungarian boat in the coxless fours competition.

At the 1972 Games in Munich he and his partner László Balogh were eliminated in the repechage of the coxless pair event.

He was a rowing coach at Ferencváros Sports Club for four years from 1974 and then at Vasas Sport Club, also for four years. He worked as a technical director at the Hungarian Rowing Association from 1994, retiring in 1999.
