= Hana Kafková =

Czech rower (born 1965)

Personal information
- Nationality: Czech
- Born: 26 June 1965 (age 59); Prague, Czechoslovakia

Sport
- Sport: Rowing

Hana Kafková (born 26 June 1965) is a Czech rower. She competed in the women's quadruple sculls event at the 1992 Summer Olympics.
