= Sybille Schmidt =

German rower

Personal information
- Born: 31 August 1967 (age 58) Apolda, East Germany

Sport
- Sport: Rowing
Medal record
Olympic Games
Representing Germany
Gold medal – first place	1992 Barcelona	Quad sculls
World Rowing Championships
Representing East Germany
Gold medal – first place	1989 Bled	Quad sculls
Gold medal – first place	1990 Tasmania	Quad sculls
Representing Germany
Gold medal – first place	1991 Vienna	Quad sculls
Summer Universiade
Representing East Germany
Bronze medal – third place	1987 Zagreb	Quad sculls

Sybille Schmidt (born 31 August 1967) is a German rower who competed for the SC Dynamo Berlin / Sportvereinigung (SV) Dynamo. She won a gold medal at the 1992 Summer Olympics and 3 Gold Medals in the World Championships, beginning with 1989 in Bled, Slovenia for the former East Germany.
