= Serena Eddy-Moulton =

American rower

Personal information
- Nationality: American
- Born: May 20, 1964 (age 60); Burlington, Vermont, United States

Sport
- Sport: Rowing

Serena Eddy-Moulton (born May 20, 1964) is an American rower. She competed in the women's quadruple sculls event at the 1992 Summer Olympics. She graduated from Harvard University.
