= Emmy Snook =

Australian rower

Emmelia Snook
Personal information
- Nationality: Australian
- Born: 4 October 1973 (age 52) Perth, Western Australia

Sport
- Country: Australia
- Sport: Rowing
- Club: University of WA; Drummoyne Rowing Club; UTS Haberfield Rowing Club

Achievements and titles
- Olympic finals: Coxless four Barcelona 1992
- National finals: Nell Slatter Trophy 1993-95

Emmelia Anne Snook (born 4 October 1973) is an Australian former representative rower. In a short six year career at the elite level, Snook was a twelve-time national champion, represented four times at World Rowing Championships and competed in the women's coxless four event at the 1992 Summer Olympics.

== Family ==
Snook is the third child of Ronald Arnott Snook of Cunderdin and Noreen Lesley Glasson of Kalgoorlie. She is the younger sister of Ronald Snook who was also an Australian representative rower and who was competing at the elite level during and after Emmy's key competitive years.

== Club and state rowing ==
A Western Australian, Snook's early senior rowing was from the University of Western Australia. Her talents were spotted early and in 1990 she was selected into the then nascent Australian Institute of Sport rowing program when she was still seventeen. In her AIS sculling years in Sydney from 1993 to 1995 she rowed from the Drummoyne Rowing Club under Paul Rowe and then from the UTS Haberfield Rowing Club under Ellen Randell.

In 1990 in UWA colours but in AIS composite crews, Snook won U19 national titles in the coxless four and the pair at the Australian Rowing Championships. In 1991 in composite AIS crews she won the national title in the eight and took silver in the four. In 1992 in Drummoyne colours she won two silver medals at the Australian Championships in the coxless four and in the women's eight.

From 1993 to 1995 Snook won the senior women's single scull title at the Australian Rowing Championships. In 1993 & 1994 she also won the double scull national title with Jennifer Luff and in 1995 she won that title again, rowing with Bronwyn Roye.

Rowing Western Australia didn't select Snook into their state senior fours in 1991 or 1992 and being a New South Wales resident, Snook was selected in 1993 as the NSW entrant to contest the Nell Slatter Trophy for single sculls at the 1993 Interstate Regatta. She won that event and repeated the feat in 1994. She won the Nell Slatter Trophy for a third time in 1995 but this time finally representing her home state of Western Australia.

== International representative rowing ==
Snook made her representative debut for Australia when selected in the junior women's eight to contest the 1990 World Junior Rowing Championships in Aiguebelette. They finished in fourth place. In 1991 she moved into the Australian women's senior squad and raced in both the coxless four and the women's eight at the 1991 World Rowing Championships in Vienna. Both crews finished their racing in the B finals.

For the 1992 Barcelona Olympics Australian selectors put a women's coxless four together with rowers from four different states. Snook secured the two seat. They had a disrupted preparation with Megan Still suffering a rib stress fracture although they raced well at the Olympic regatta. They placed 3rd in their heat, 2nd in the repechage and made the A final where they finished in 6th place.

By 1993 Snook had moved into the Australian women's sculling squad. She raced a single scull at both World Rowing Cups I and II that year and then was Australia's selected entrant in the single scull for the 1993 World Rowing Championships in Racice where she finished in overall tenth place. In 1995 Snook made her last Australian representative appearance when picked with Bronwyn Roye to race a double-scull at the 1995 World Rowing Championships in Finland. They finished sixth in the A final.
