= Lene Pedersen (rower) =

Danish rower (born 1972)

Personal information
- Nationality: Danish
- Born: 22 April 1972 (age 52)

Sport
- Sport: Rowing

Lene Pedersen (born 22 April 1972) is a Danish rower. She competed in the women's quadruple sculls event at the 1992 Summer Olympics.
