= Mariana Yankulova =

Bulgarian rower

Personal information
- Nationality: Bulgarian
- Born: 23 August 1969 (age 55); Velingrad, Bulgaria

Sport
- Sport: Rowing

Mariana Yankulova (Bulgarian: Марияна Янкулова; born 23 August 1969) is a Bulgarian rower. She competed in the women's coxless four event at the 1992 Summer Olympics.
