= Krasimira Tocheva =

Bulgarian rower

Personal information
- Nationality: Bulgarian
- Born: 28 July 1967 (age 57); Sofia, Bulgaria

Sport
- Sport: Rowing

Krasimira Tocheva (Bulgarian: Красимира Точева; born 28 July 1967) is a Bulgarian rower. She competed in the women's quadruple sculls event at the 1988 Summer Olympics.
