= Allison Barnett (rower) =

British rower (born 1966)

Personal information
- Full name: Allison Elena Barnett
- Nationality: British
- Born: 19 March 1966 (age 60) Reading, England

Sport
- Sport: Rowing

Allison Elena Barnett (born 19 March 1966) is a British rower.

== Early life ==
She came from Addlestone.

== Career ==
She competed in the women's coxless four event at the 1992 Summer Olympics.

She rowed with Kim Thomas in the 1984 and 1992 Olympics.
