= Anita Meiland =

Dutch rower

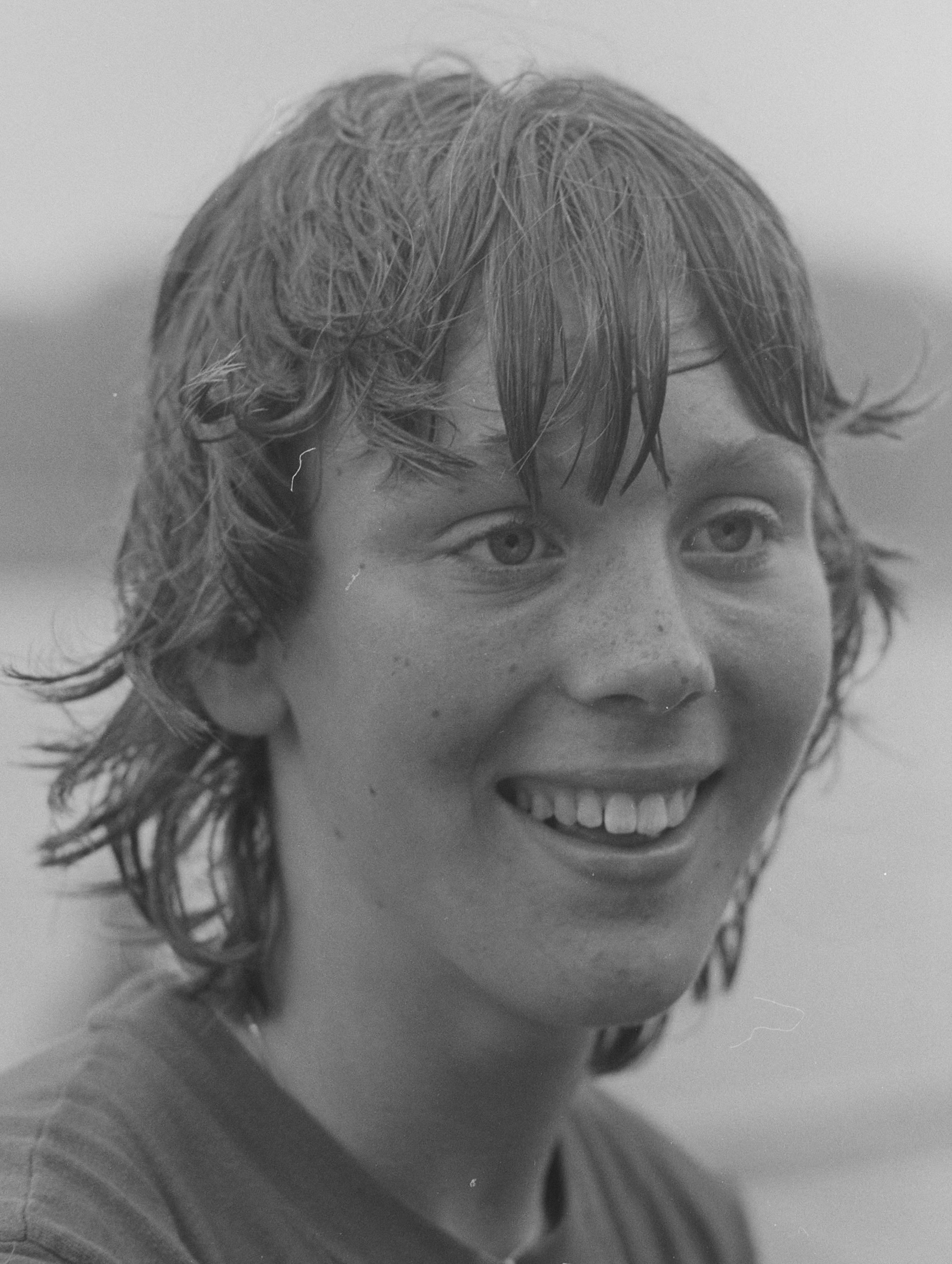
- Anita Meiland, in 1983

Personal information
- Nationality: Dutch
- Born: 12 November 1967 (age 57); Haarlem, Netherlands

Sport
- Sport: Rowing

Anita Meiland (born 12 November 1967) is a Dutch rower. She competed in the women's quadruple sculls event at the 1992 Summer Olympics.
