= Annette Hohn =

German rower (born 1966)

Medal record

Women's rowing

Representing Germany

Olympic Games
Bronze medal – third place	1992 Barcelona	Coxless four

World Rowing Championships
Silver medal – second place	1989 Bled	W8+
Bronze medal – third place	1990 Tasmania	W8+

Annette Hohn (born 22 November 1966 in Schwerin) is a German rower.
