= Frédérique Heligon =

French rower

Personal information
- Nationality: French
- Born: 27 February 1970 (age 55); Nantes, France

Sport
- Sport: Rowing

Frédérique Heligon (born 27 February 1970) is a French rower. She competed in the women's coxless four event at the 1992 Summer Olympics.
