= Yan Hong =

Yan Hong is the name of:

- Yan Hong (racewalker) (born 1966), Chinese race walking athlete
- Yan Hong (swimmer) (born 1967), Chinese swimmer

== See also ==
- Yanhong (盐鸿), a town in Shantou, Guangdong, China
- Yang Hong (disambiguation)
