= Erika Bertényi =

Hungarian rower

Personal information
- Nationality: Hungarian
- Born: 18 March 1959 (age 66); Vác, Hungary

Sport
- Sport: Rowing

Erika Bertényi (born 18 March 1959) is a Hungarian rower. She competed in the women's quadruple sculls event at the 1988 Summer Olympics.
