= Marie-José de Groot =

Dutch rower

Personal information
- Nationality: Dutch
- Born: 22 January 1966 (age 59); Someren, Netherlands

Sport
- Sport: Rowing

Josephina Maria Allegonda de Groot (born 22 January 1966), known as Marie-José de Groot, is a Dutch rower. She competed in the women's double sculls event at the 1992 Summer Olympics.
