= Ulla Werner Hansen =

Danish rower

Personal information
- Nationality: Danish
- Born: 27 November 1973 (age 51)

Sport
- Sport: Rowing

Ulla Werner Hansen (born 27 November 1973) is a Danish rower. She competed in the women's quadruple sculls event at the 1992 Summer Olympics.
