= Liliya Stoyanova =

Bulgarian rower

Personal information
- Nationality: Bulgarian
- Born: 19 November 1968 (age 56); Sofia, Bulgaria

Sport
- Sport: Rowing

Liliya Stoyanova (Bulgarian: Лилия Стоянова; born 19 November 1968) is a Bulgarian rower. She competed in the women's coxless four event at the 1992 Summer Olympics.
