= Angela Herron =

American rower (born 1961)

Personal information
- Born: May 25, 1961 (age 65)

Sport
- Sport: Rowing
Medal record
Women's rowing
Representing United States
World Rowing Championships
Gold medal – first place	1984 Montreal	LW8+
Bronze medal – third place	1986 Nottingham	LW1x
Gold medal – first place	1987 Copenhagen	LW4-

Angela Herron (born May 25, 1961) is a retired American lightweight rower. She won a gold medal at the 1984 World Rowing Championships in Montreal, Canada, with the lightweight women's eight; this was the only year that this boat class competed at World Rowing Championships. At the 1986 World Rowing Championships in Nottingham, she won a bronze medal in the lightweight women's single scull. At the 1987 World Rowing Championships in Copenhagen, she became world champion in the lightweight women's four. At the 1991 World Rowing Championships in Vienna, she came fourth in the lightweight women's single scull.

She also competed in the women's quadruple sculls event at the 1988 Summer Olympics.
