= Annabel Eyres =

British rower

Personal information
- Full name: Annabel Juliet Eyres
- Nationality: British
- Born: 4 February 1965 (age 61) London, England
- Education: City of London School for Girls; Bryanston School; Ruskin School of Drawing and Fine Art; University of Oxford
- Height: 183 cm (6 ft 0 in)
- Weight: 70 kg (154 lb)
- Other interests: Artist, printmaking
- Website: www.annabeleyres.com

Sport
- Country: United Kingdom
- Sport: Rowing
- University team: Oxford University Women's Boat Club; Pembroke College Boat Club (Oxford)
- Club: Tideway Scullers School; Upper Thames RC

Achievements and titles
- Olympic finals: 1992 Summer Olympics, women's double sculls
- World finals: 1989 World Rowing Championships women's quadruple sculls; 1991 World Rowing Championships women's double sculls
- National finals: 1990 British Rowing Championships, women's coxless pairs

Annabel Juliet Eyres (born 4 February 1965) is a British international rower and artist.

Annabel Eyres was educated at the City of London School for Girls in London and Bryanston School in Dorset. She then studied at the Ruskin School of Drawing and Fine Art, University of Oxford, where she was a student at Pembroke College. During this time, she rowed for the Pembroke College Boat Club and the Oxford University Women's Boat Club, competing in the Oxford and Cambridge Women's Boat Race. She also rowed for the Tideway Scullers School and the Upper Thames Rowing Club.

Eyres competed in the women's double sculls event at the 1992 Summer Olympics. She was part of the coxless pairs with Joanne Gough that won the national title rowing for the British squad at the 1990 National Championships. She also completed in the 1989 World Rowing Championships women's quadruple sculls final and the 1991 World Rowing Championships women's double sculls final.

As well as rowing, Eyres has been an artist, producing prints and also paper cuts and collages, as well as painting, especially of rowing-related subjects. She helped form the company Rock the Boat, selling rowing-related items, including artworks. She has exhibited regularly in London, including at the Riverside Gallery, and Oxford, including as part of Oxfordshire Artweeks.

Annabel Eyres is married with a family.
