= Feng Lili =

Chinese rower

Personal information
- Nationality: Chinese
- Born: 26 July 1973 (age 51)

Sport
- Sport: Rowing

Feng Lili (born 26 July 1973) is a Chinese rower. She competed in the women's quadruple sculls event at the 1992 Summer Olympics.
