= Jodie Dobson =

Australian rower

Personal information
- Nationality: Australian
- Born: 5 September 1969 (age 55)

Sport
- Sport: Rowing

Jodie Dobson (born 5 September 1969) is an Australian rower. She competed in the women's coxless four event at the 1992 Summer Olympics.
