= Alison Townley =

American rower

Personal information
- Born: September 6, 1965 (age 59); Minneapolis, Minnesota, United States

Sport
- Sport: Rowing

Alison Townley (born September 6, 1965) is an American rower. She competed at the 1988 Summer Olympics and the 1992 Summer Olympics. She graduated from Harvard University. After her rowing career, Townley went on to work for L'Oréal and Chevron, before becoming a dressage trainer in Oakland Hills.

== Biography ==
Townley was born in Minneapolis in 1965. She was part of the United States national rowing team from 1985 to 1992. She won two silver medals at the 1986 Goodwill Games in Moscow, and went on to repeat the feat at the 1990 Goodwill Games in Seattle. Townley also took part in five editions of the World Rowing Championships from 1985 to 1991, winning a bronze medal at the 1990 edition. She also rowed for Harvard University, and after graduation in 1987 she won the Alumnae Association Award from Radcliffe College.

Townley competed in women's eight event at the 1988 Summer Olympics in Seoul, where the US team finished in sixth place. Four years later, at the 1992 Summer Olympics in Barcelona, Townley was part of the US women's quadruple sculls team that finished in fifth place.

After her rowing career, Townley went to work for L'Oréal in New York, before moving to the West Coast to work in marketing for Chevron. After working for Chevron for some years, she quit her job to become a dressage trainer in California. In January 2022, she was appointed as one of the six new board members of the National Rowing Foundation.
