= Kerstin Müller =

German rower

Medal record

Women's rowing

Representing Germany

Olympic Games
Gold medal – first place	1992 Barcelona	Quadruple sculls

World Rowing Championships
Silver medal – second place	1993 Račice	Quadruple sculls

Kerstin Müller (born 7 June 1969 in Halle, Saxony-Anhalt) is a German rower.
