= Renée Govaert =

Belgian rower

Personal information
- Nationality: Belgian
- Born: 25 January 1962 (age 64)

Sport
- Sport: Rowing

Renée Govaert (born 25 January 1962) is a Belgian rower. She competed in the women's double sculls event at the 1992 Summer Olympics.
