= Nicolette Wessel =

Dutch rower (born 1959)

Personal information
- Nationality: Dutch
- Born: 18 October 1959 (age 65); The Hague, Netherlands

Sport
- Sport: Rowing

Nicolette Wessel (born 18 October 1959) is a Dutch rower. She competed in the women's quadruple sculls event at the 1988 Summer Olympics.
