= Sevdalina Teokharova =

Bulgarian rower

Personal information
- Nationality: Bulgarian
- Born: 24 July 1974 (age 50)

Sport
- Sport: Rowing

Sevdalina Teokharova (Bulgarian: Севдалина Теохарова; born 24 July 1974) is a Bulgarian rower. She competed in the women's quadruple sculls event at the 1992 Summer Olympics.
