= Anne Martin (rower) =

American rower

Personal information
- Nationality: American
- Born: September 24, 1961 (age 63)

Sport
- Sport: Rowing

Anne Martin (born September 24, 1961) is an American rower. She competed in the women's quadruple sculls event at the 1988 Summer Olympics. After her rowing career, Martin worked as the Chief Investment Officer at Wesleyan University.

== Biography ==
Martin was born in 1961. She attended Smith College, and took up rowing in the early 1980s during her sophomore year. She competed at the World Rowing Championships from 1984 to 1987. At the 1984 and 1985 Championships, she won bronze in the single sculls. At the 1986 World Rowing Championships, Martin won gold in the coxless four. After the World Championships, Martin began training for a spot on the US Olympic team.

At the 1988 Summer Olympics in Seoul, Martin competed in the women's quadruple sculls, where the US team finished in ninth place.

After her rowing career, Martin went to Stanford University earning an MBA. She started work in the finance sector at Alex. Brown & Sons, before moving to a private equity company in San Francisco. After becoming a director at Yale Investments Office, Martin became the chief investment officer at Wesleyan University.

Martin is married to John Pescatore, who also rowed for the United States at the Olympics in 1988 and 1992, and has twin boys. She was inducted into the National Rowing Foundation's hall of fame in 1997.
