= Marie-Anne Vandermoere =

Belgian rower

Personal information
- Nationality: Belgian
- Born: 10 September 1966 (age 60) Bruges, Belgium

Sport
- Sport: Rowing

Marie-Anne Vandermoere (born 10 September 1966) is a Belgian rower. She competed in the women's quadruple sculls event at the 1988 Summer Olympics.
