= Kristina Mundt =

German rower

Medal record

Women's rowing

Representing East Germany

Olympic Games
Gold medal – first place	1988 Seoul	Quadruple sculls

World Rowing Championships
Gold medal – first place	1985 Hazewinkel	Quadruple sculls

Representing Germany

Olympic Games
Gold medal – first place	1992 Barcelona	Quadruple sculls

World Rowing Championships
Gold medal – first place	1994 Indianapolis	Quadruple sculls (W4x)
Silver medal – second place	1993 Račice	Quadruple sculls (W4x)

Kristina Mundt (later Richter, born 25 January 1966) is a German rower. She won gold medals in the 1988 and 1992 Olympics. Mundt studied sports science at Leipzig University, and after her sporting career went on to work for the general regional health insurance (AOK) Leipzig.

Mundt was born in Merseburg. In October 1986, she was awarded a Patriotic Order of Merit in gold (first class) for her sporting success.
