= Someren =

- Town and municipality
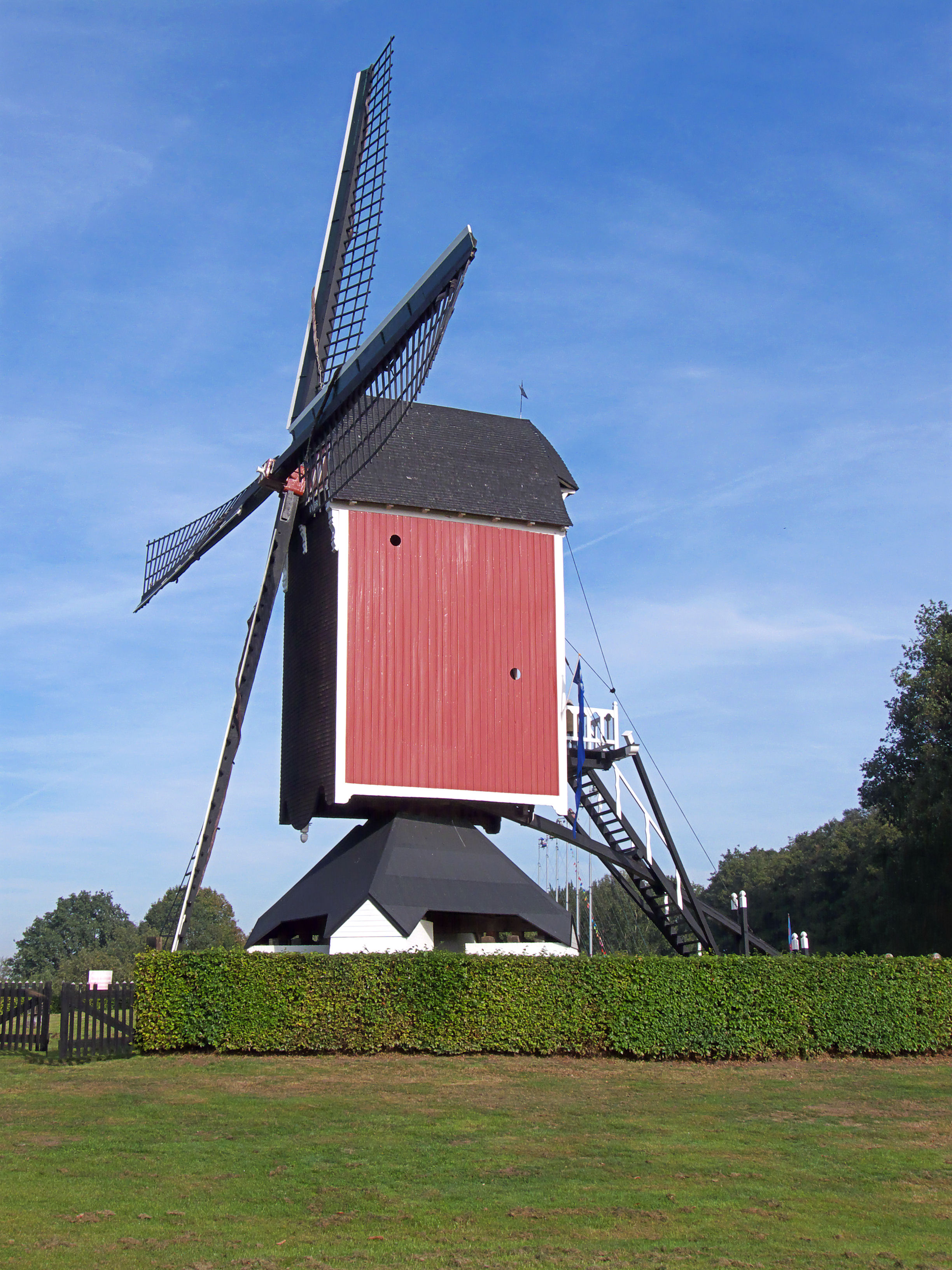
- Listed (monument) windmill in Someren

- Flag Coat of arms

- Location in North Brabant
- Coordinates: 51°23′N 5°43′E
- Country: Netherlands
- Province: North Brabant

Government
  - Body: Municipal council
  - Mayor: Elly Blanksma (acting) (CDA)

Area
  - Total: 81.50 km^{2} (31.47 sq mi)
  - Land: 80.27 km^{2} (30.99 sq mi)
  - Water: 1.23 km^{2} (0.47 sq mi)
- Elevation: 26 m (85 ft)

Population (January 2021)
  - Total: 19,428
  - Density: 242/km^{2} (630/sq mi)
- Demonym: Somerenaar
- Time zone: UTC+1 (CET)
  - Summer (DST): UTC+2 (CEST)
- Postcode: 5710–5715
- Area code: 0492, 0493
- Website: www.someren.nl

Someren (Dutch pronunciation: [ˈsoːmərə(n)]) is a municipality and town in the province of North Brabant in the Southern Netherlands. As of January 2019, the municipality had 19,322 inhabitants, with over half of the population residing in the town. Someren, just south of Helmond and to the north of Weert, Limburg, is located on the provincial border with Limburg.

The spoken dialect is Peellands (an East Brabantian dialect, which is very similar to colloquial Dutch). In Brabantian, Someren is known as Zummere.

== Population centres ==
- Someren-Eind
- Someren-Heide
- Someren
- Lierop

=== Topography ===
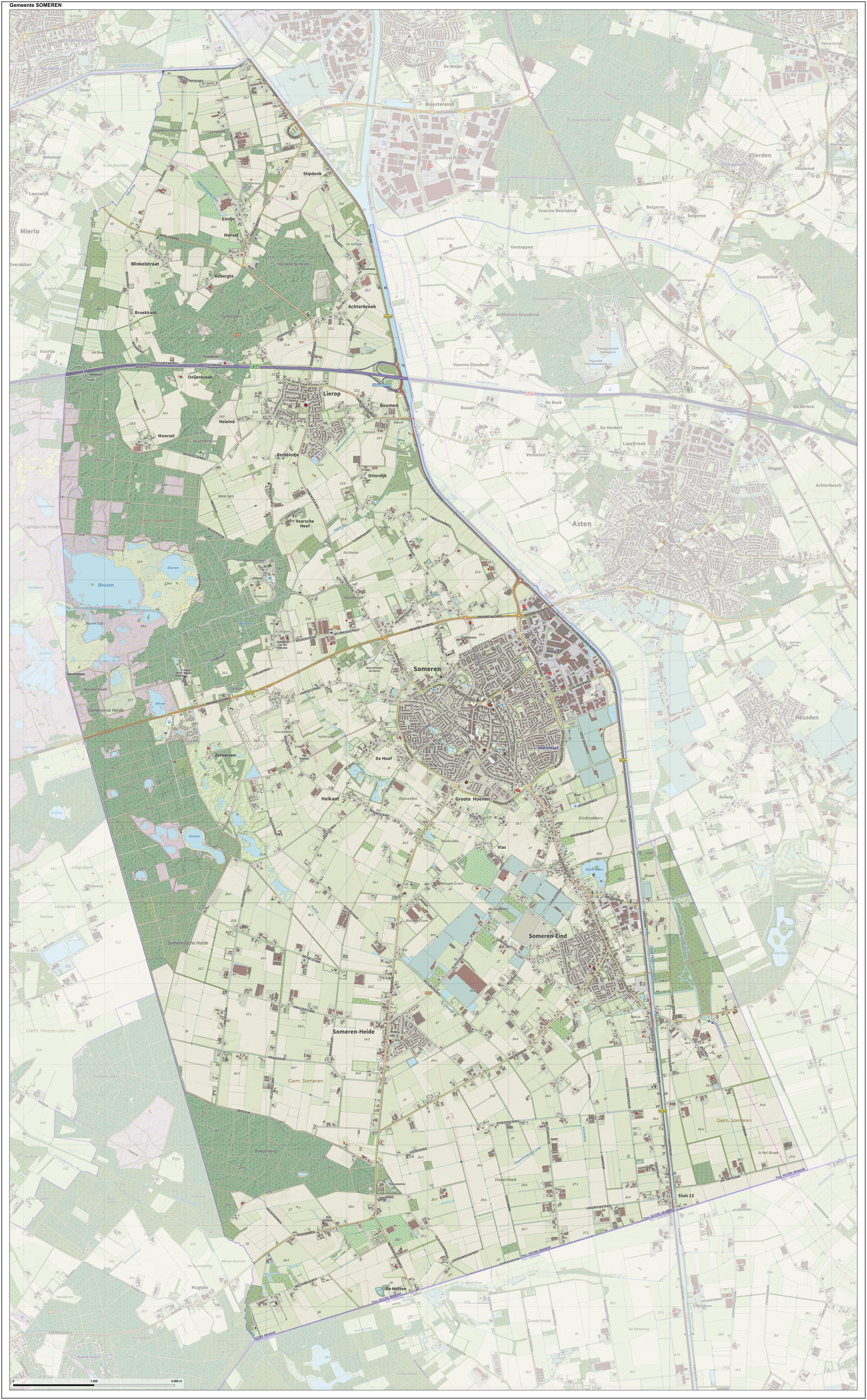

Dutch Topographic map of the municipality of Someren, June 2015

== Notable people ==
- Antonius Lambertus Maria Hurkmans (born 1944 in Someren) Bishop emeritus of the Roman Catholic Diocese of 's-Hertogenbosch
- Marie-José de Groot (born 1966 in Someren) a Dutch rower, competed at the 1992 Summer Olympics
- Vincent Voorn (born 1984 in Someren) a Dutch show jumper, competed in the 2008 Summer Olympics
- Evy Kuijpers (born 1995 in Lierop) a Dutch professional racing cyclist

== Gallery ==
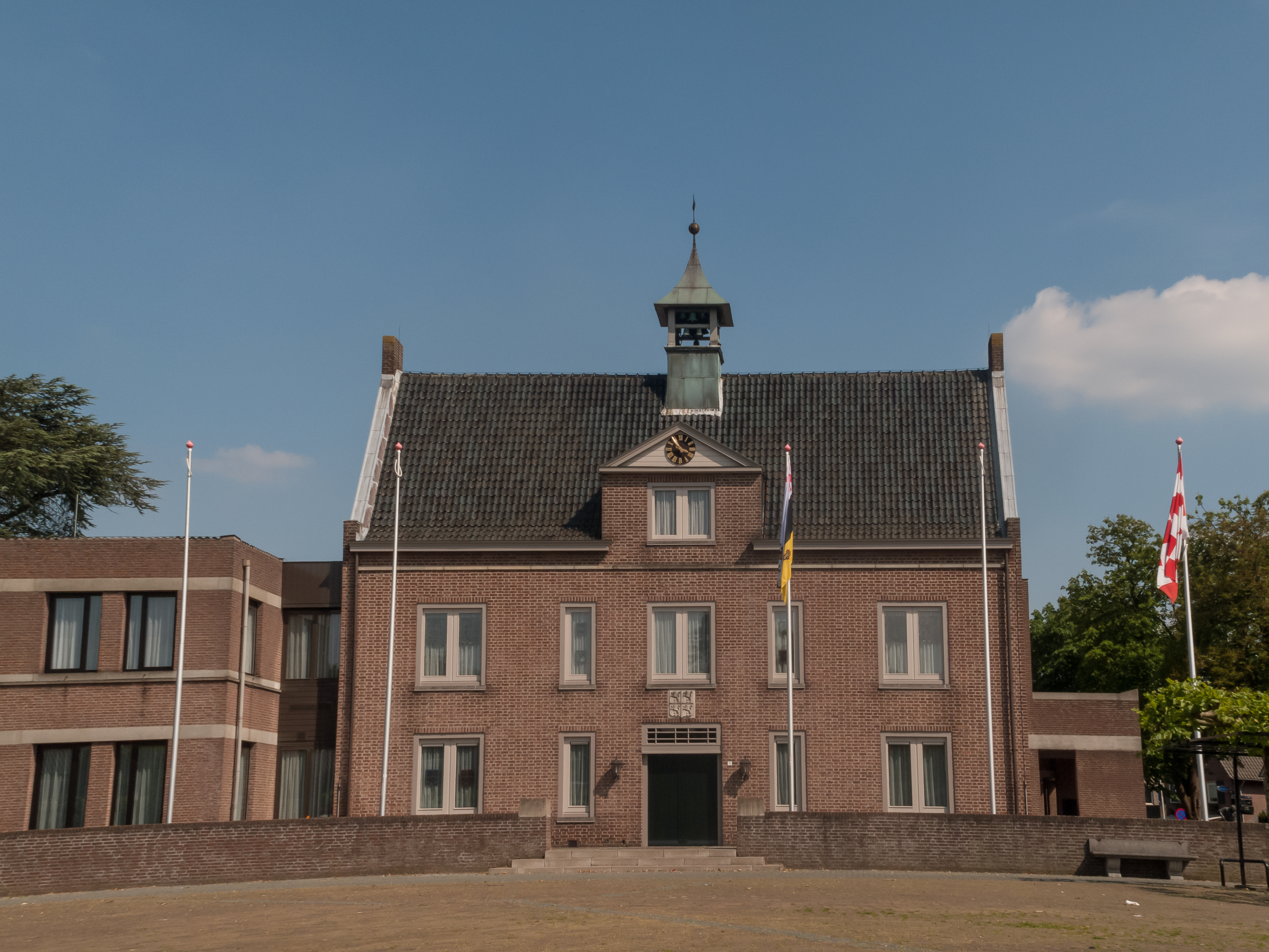
Someren, townhall

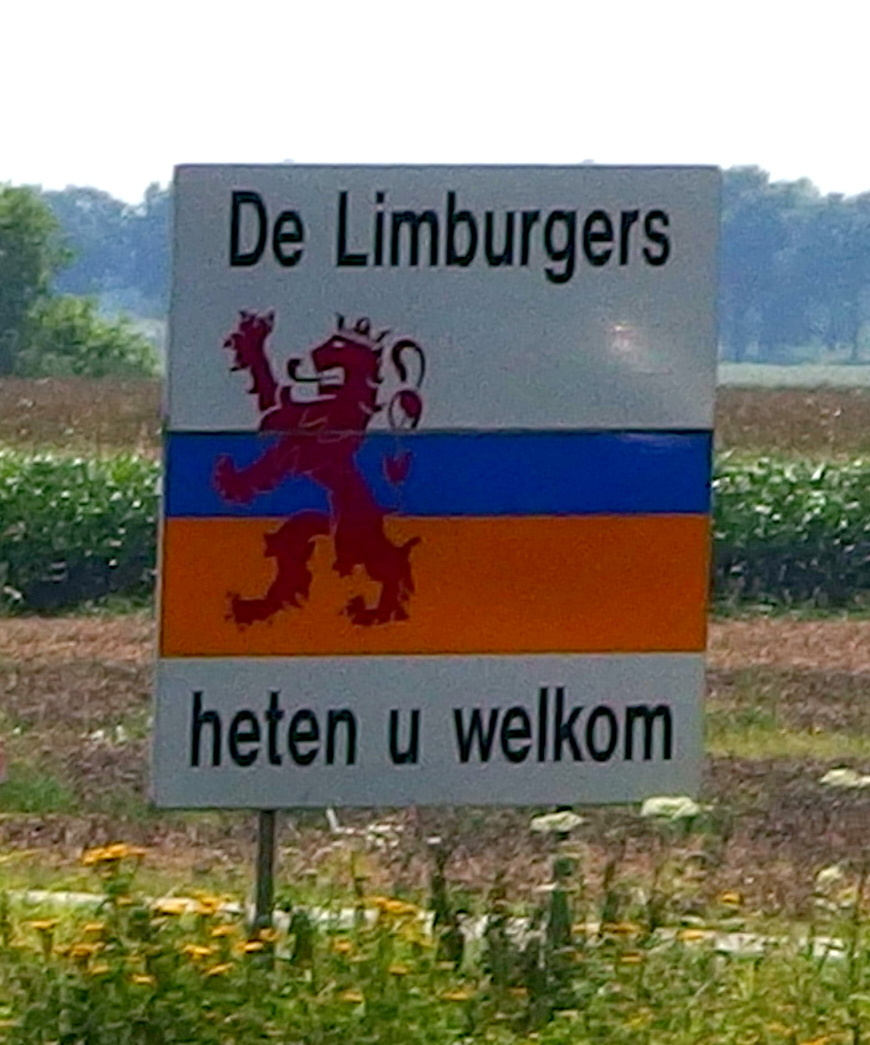
Border of North Brabant and Limburg alongside Zuid-Willemsvaart

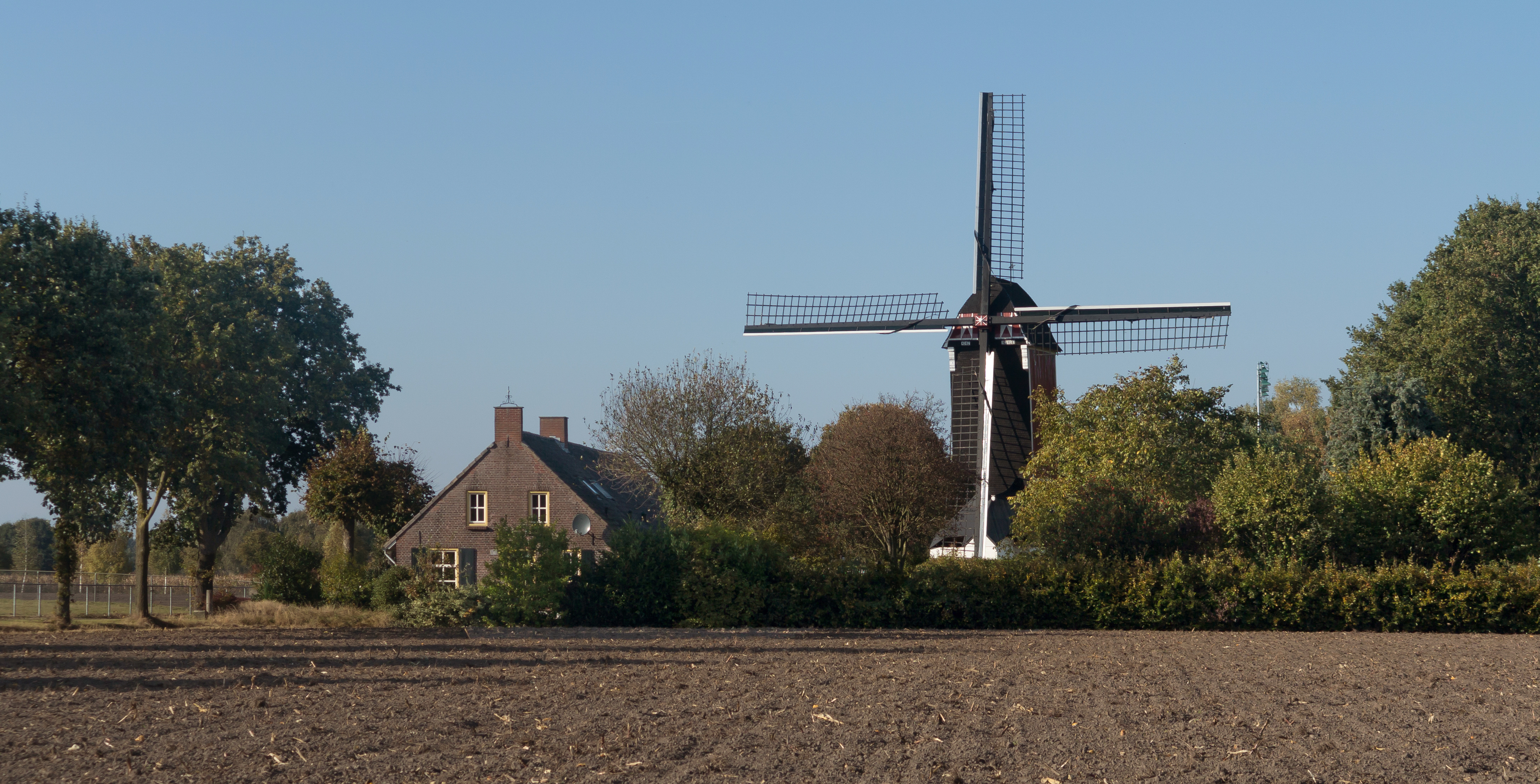
Someren, windmill: standerdmolen Den Evert

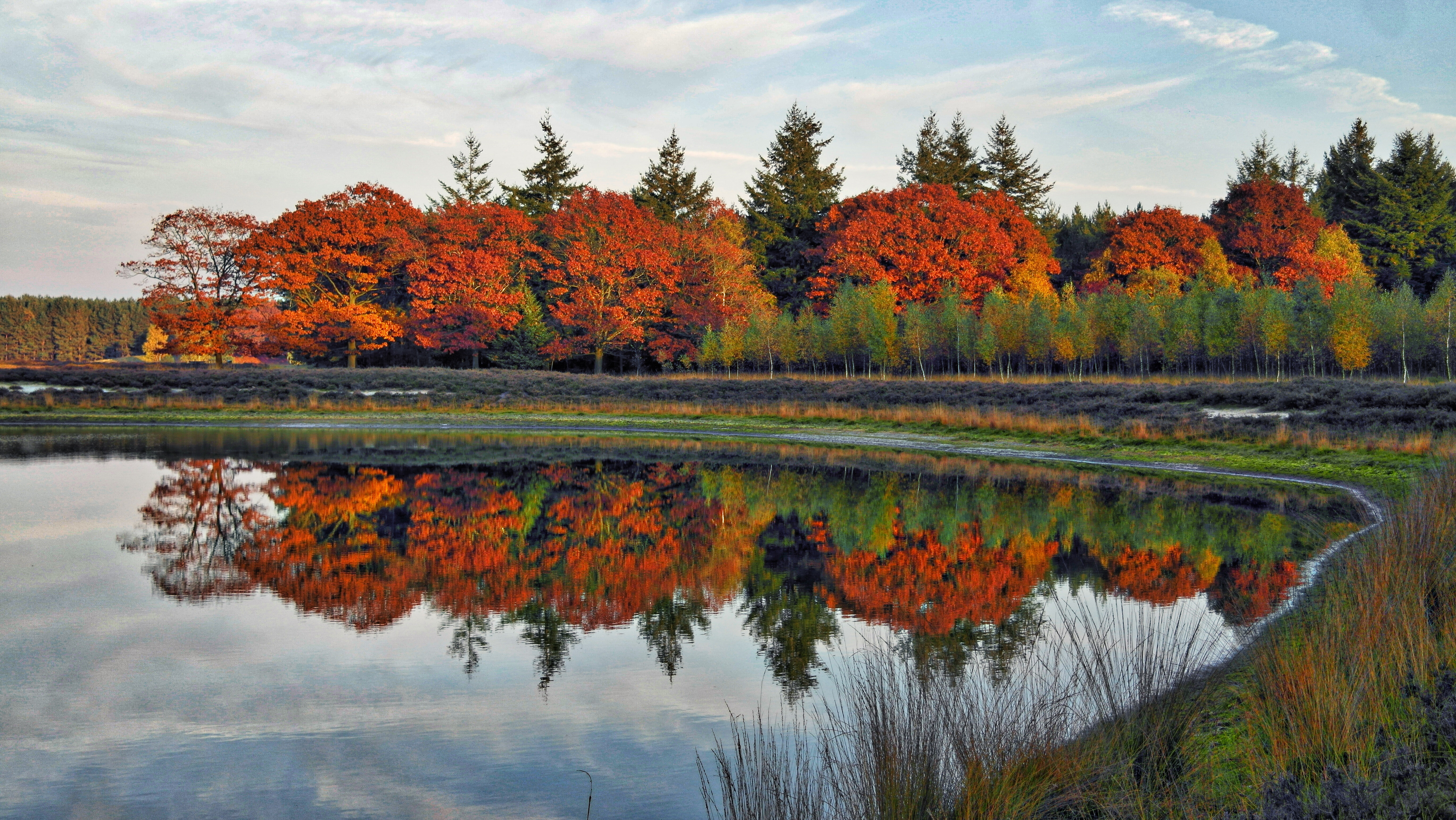
Somerense Heide

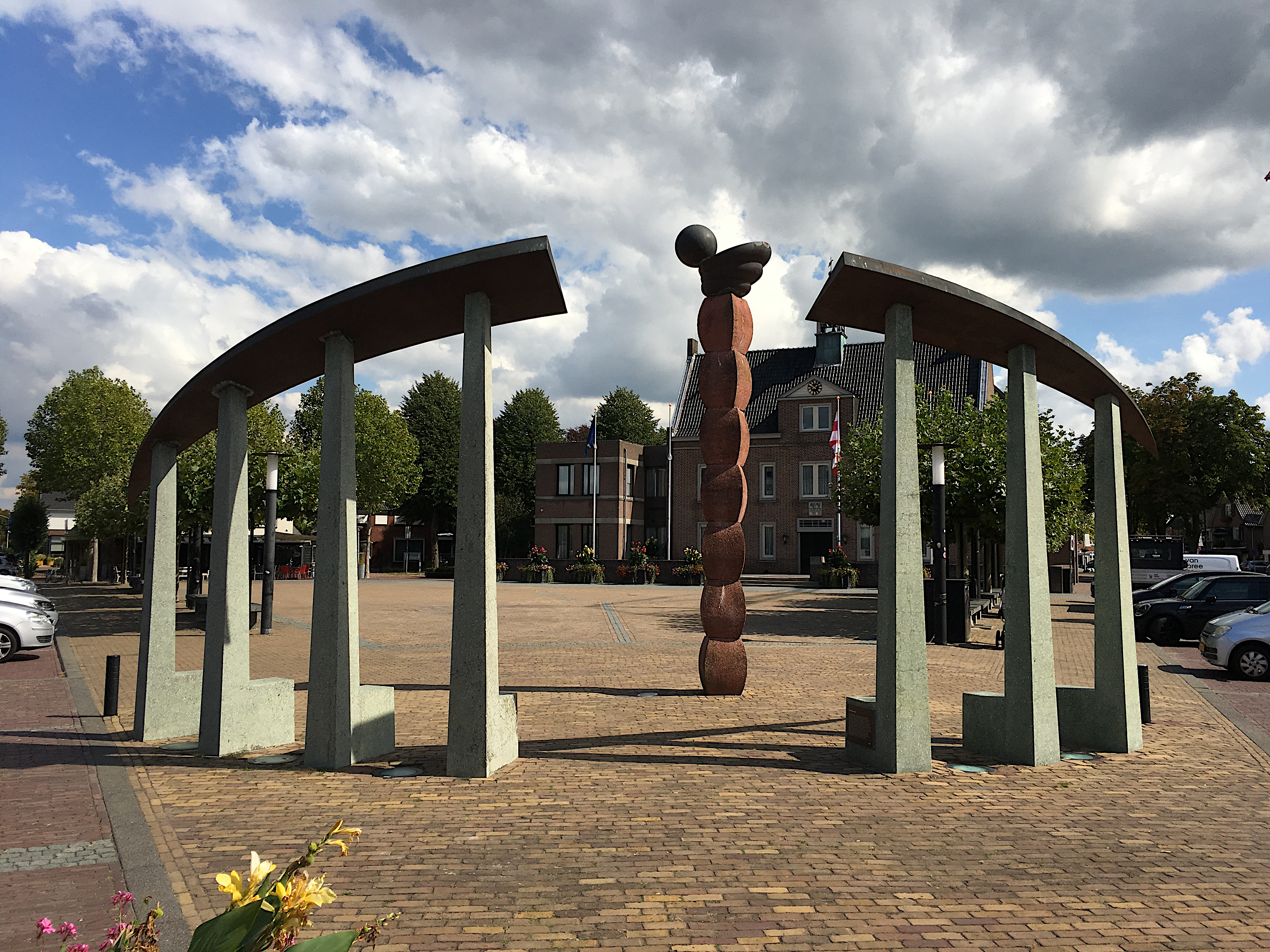
Someren Ruimtelijk Object Jan Samsom

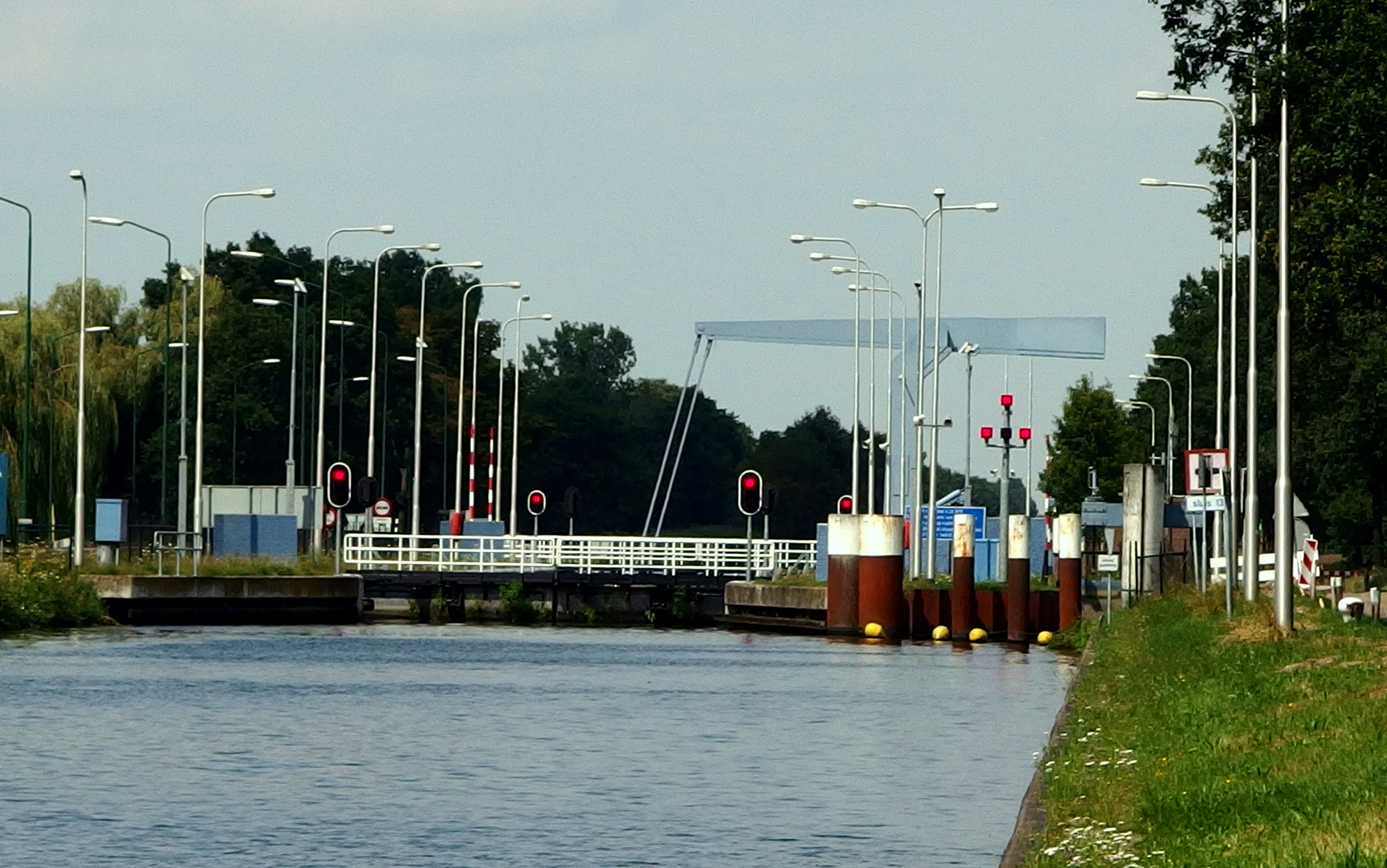
Sluis (canal lock) 13 in Zuid-Willemsvaart

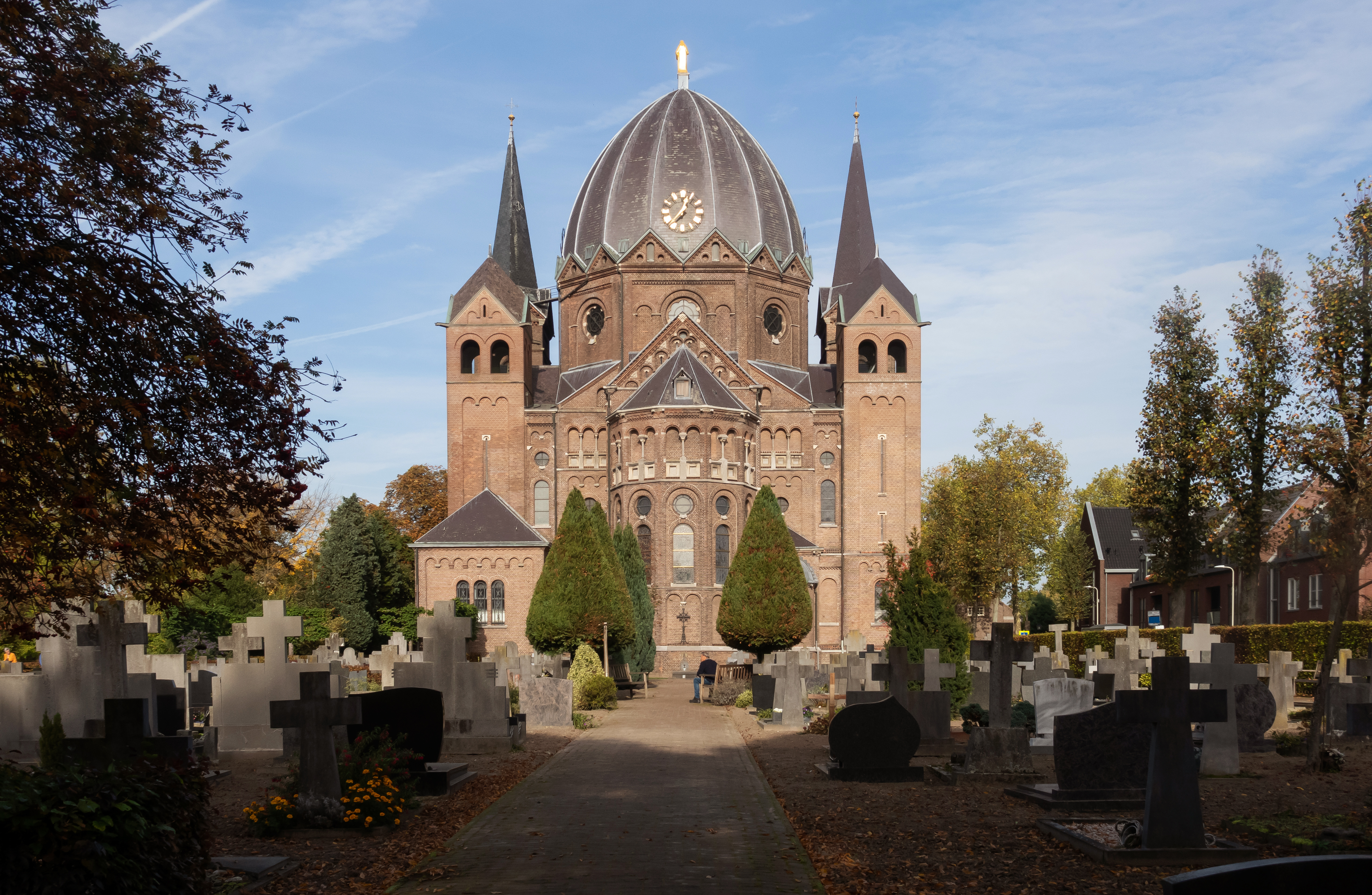
Lierop, church: Heilige Naam Jezuskerk
