= Gillian Campbell =

Australian rower

Personal information
- Full name: Gillian Margaret Campbell
- Nationality: Australian
- Born: 21 August 1960 (age 65)

Sport
- Sport: Rowing

Gillian Margaret Campbell (born 21 August 1960) is a former competitive Australian rower. In the six seasons from 1988 to 1993 she was consistently in the top-tier of Australian heavyweight women scullers winning ten national sculling titles and one sweep-oared championship title. She competed in the women's double sculls event at the 1992 Summer Olympics.

== Club and state rowing ==
Gillian Campbell's senior rowing was from the Leichhardt Rowing Club in Sydney and later when she made national training squads she raced in Australian Institute of Sport colours. She was Leichhardt's first female club captain, serving from 1988 to 1992.

Campbell first made state selection for New South Wales when she was picked as the 1988 single scull representative contesting the Nell Slatter trophy at the Interstate Regatta within the Australian Rowing Championships - she placed second. The following year she again contested that event placing sixth and in 1992 she placed third. In 1991, at the annual Interstate Regatta in the New South Wales women's heavyweight four, she contested and won the ULVA Trophy. This was before the elite heavyweight women raced for the Queen's Cup. In 1993 and 1994, she again rowed in the New South Wales women's four for the ULVA Trophy, placing second on both occasions.

Campbell first competed for national titles at the Australian Rowing Championships in 1988 when she raced in Leichhardt colours in all three open women's sculling classes. She won the double and quad sculls championships and placed third in the single. The 1989 Australian Championships were interrupted by cyclonic conditions, but not before the open women's single scull final was raced in which Campbell placed second.

By 1990, she was racing in crews with Jenny Luff with whom she would share national success and pair up for World Championships and Olympics. They won the 1990 national titles in the double and the quad, and Campbell finished 2nd in the single. At the Australian Rowing Championships in 1991, she was the victorious Australian Champion in all three women's heavyweight sculling classes. She was recognized as the New South Wales Oarswoman of the Year for the 1988/89 and the 1990/91 seasons.

In 1992, Campbell placed second in the single scull and racing in AIS colours with Luff, won the double and the quad. In 1993, she placed third in her single scull national title attempt and second in the double scull rowing with Adair Ferguson. She won her eleventh and final Australian title that year in a composite selection quad scull. Campbell had rowed in every Australian championship winning women's quad scull contested between 1988 and 1993.

== International representative rowing ==
Campbell's first Australian representative selection came in 1990 when with Jenny Luff as the current Australian double scull champions, they were selected to race the double at the 1990 World Rowing Championships in Lake Barrington, Tasmania. They placed fifth. At the 1991 World Rowing Championships in Vienna, Luff and Campbell slipped down the rankings and finished seventh overall. By the 1992 Barcelona Olympics Luff and Campbell were still seen as superior to all other domestic crews and were selected to race the double at Barcelona. They missed the A final and finished eighth overall. It was Campbell's last Australian representative outing.

== Coaching career ==
Campbell was a Physical Education Teacher at Pymble Ladies College during her rowing career and was instrumental in the Leichhardt Rowing Club's 1992 decision to open its facilities to a school rowing program with PLC. That co-operative arrangement and the broader Sydney Rowing Competition for Girls' Independent Schools are still flourishing as of 2022.

Gillian and her husband, Mark Campbell, coached crews at Pymble Ladies College from the 1990s through to 2012. PLC first eights coached by Campbell won the NSW Schoolgirls Head of The River successively from 2000 to 2009 and in 2012.
