= Amy Fuller =

American rower (1968–2023)

Personal information
- Born: May 30, 1968 Inglewood, California, U.S.
- Died: March 11, 2023 (aged 54) Los Angeles, California, U.S.
Medal record
Women's rowing
Representing United States
Olympic Games
Silver medal – second place	1992 Barcelona	Coxless four
World Rowing Championships
Gold medal – first place	1995 Tampere	W8+
Silver medal – second place	1993 Račice	W8+
Silver medal – second place	1993 Račice	W4-
Silver medal – second place	1994 Indianapolis	W8+
Silver medal – second place	1994 Indianapolis	W4-
Silver medal – second place	1998 Cologne	W8+
Silver medal – second place	1999 St. Catharines	W8+

Amy Lynn Fuller (May 30, 1968 – March 11, 2023) was an American rower, three-time Olympian, and one time World Record holder. In 1993, she was acclaimed as the U.S. Rowing Female Athlete of the Year, and in 1995, she was a finalist for the James E. Sullivan Award, given annually to the nation's top amateur athlete.

Fuller earned trips to the Olympics in 1992, 1996, and 2000. In 1992, she brought home a silver medal in the women's 4-, and in 1996 and 2000, she placed in the top 6 in the women's 8+. Fuller also competed in eight World Championships, earning one gold medal and six silver medals (1989, 1991, 1993–95, 1997–98, and 1999).

Fuller died from breast cancer in Los Angeles on March 11, 2023, at the age of 54.
