= Kim Thomas =

British rower

Kimothy thomas
Personal information
- Born: Kim Susannah Thomas; 10 October 1967 (age 59) Wandsworth, London, Great Britain
- Occupation: Teacher
- Height: 174 cm (5 ft 9 in)
- Weight: 70 kg (150 lb)

Sport
- Sport: Rowing
- Club: Weybridge Ladies ARC; Durham University Boat Club; Leander Club

Kim Susannah Thomas (born 10 October 1967) is a former competitive rower from Great Britain.

== Early life ==
Thomas was born in 1967 in Wandsworth, Great Britain. She grew up in Ottershaw in Surrey.

She is a member of the Leander Club at Henley-on-Thames. She received her education at Surbiton High School in Surbiton, and then studied engineering at Durham University in October 1988, as a deferred entry. She then trained as a teacher concentrating on physics, but later focussed on mathematics.

== Rowing career ==
She competed at the World Rowing Junior Championships in 1983, 1984, and 1985. In 1983 in Vichy, France, she came fifth with the junior women's eight. In 1984 in Jönköping, Sweden, she came sixth in the junior women's coxed four. A year later in the same boat class but with a different team, she came fifth.

In 1987, Thomas competed at senior level and was part of the coxless pairs with Alison Bonner that won the national title rowing for a Kingston and Weybridge Ladies composite, at the 1987 National Championships and at that year's World Rowing Championships, she competed in the women's pair with Alison Bonner and they came seventh. Thomas and Bonner competed at the 1988 Summer Olympics in the coxless pair and came eighths. At the 1989 World Rowing Championships at Lake Bled near Bled in SR Slovenia, Yugoslavia, she teamed up with Catherine Miller in the women's pair and they came in eleventh (and last) place.

At the 1992 Summer Olympics, she was a member of Great Britain's coxless four, and the team came eighths in the competition. She was a member of the Durham University Boat Club from 1989 to 1991.

In 1989, Thomas was the second recipient of The Sunday Times Sportswoman of the Year award.

== Professional career ==
Thomas' first teaching role was at Kingston Grammar School, where she joined their mathematics department. After two years in that role, she went to Pangbourne College as head of mathematics.

At present, she is a teacher at Albyn School in Aberdeen, Scotland, and coaches rowing as part of her job.
