= Hongyan =

Hongyan may refer to:

- Red Crag, 1961 Chinese novel by Luo Guangbin and Yang Yiyan
- Dam Street, 2005 Chinese film by Li Yu
- Red Rock Village Museum, or Hongyan Village
- Hongyan River (红岩河), a tributary of Liuchong River
- Hongyan, an automotive marque owned by SAIC Iveco Hongyan

Towns in China (红岩镇)

- Hongyan, Suining, Hunan
- Hongyan, Guangyuan, Sichuan
- Hongyan, Pengzhou, Sichuan
- Hongyan, Midu, Yunnan

Townships in China (红岩乡)

- Hongyan, Liupanshui, Guizhou
- Hongyan, Hongjiang, Hunan
- Hongyan, Heishui, Sichuan
- Hongyan, Huaying, Sichuan
- Hongyan, Huidong, Sichuan
- Hongyan, Linshui, Sichuan
- Hongyan, Mingshan, Sichuan
- Hongyan, Nanjiang, Sichuan

Given names

- Pi Hongyan, badminton player
- Xi Hongyan, ice dancer
- Xiao Hongyan, runner
- Yan Hongyan, general
- Zhong Hongyan, canoeist
- Hongyan (prince), Manchu prince

== See also ==
- Hongyanhe Nuclear Power Plant
