= Sariya Zakyrova =

Russian rower

Personal information
- Nationality: Russian
- Born: 10 April 1964 (age 60); Naberezhnye Chelny, Tatar ASSR, Soviet Union

Sport
- Sport: Rowing

Sariya Mahrupovna Zakyrova (Russian: Сария́ Магру́повна Заки́рова, Tatar: Сәрия Мәгъруф кызы Закирова, born 10 April 1964) is a Russian rower. She competed at the 1988 Summer Olympics and the 1992 Summer Olympics.
