= Yang Hong (rower) =

Chinese rower

Personal information
- Nationality: Chinese
- Born: 8 September 1971 (age 53)

Sport
- Sport: Rowing

Yang Hong (Chinese: 楊 紅; born 8 September 1971) is a Chinese rower. She competed in the women's quadruple sculls event at the 1992 Summer Olympics.
