= Someren-Eind =

- Village
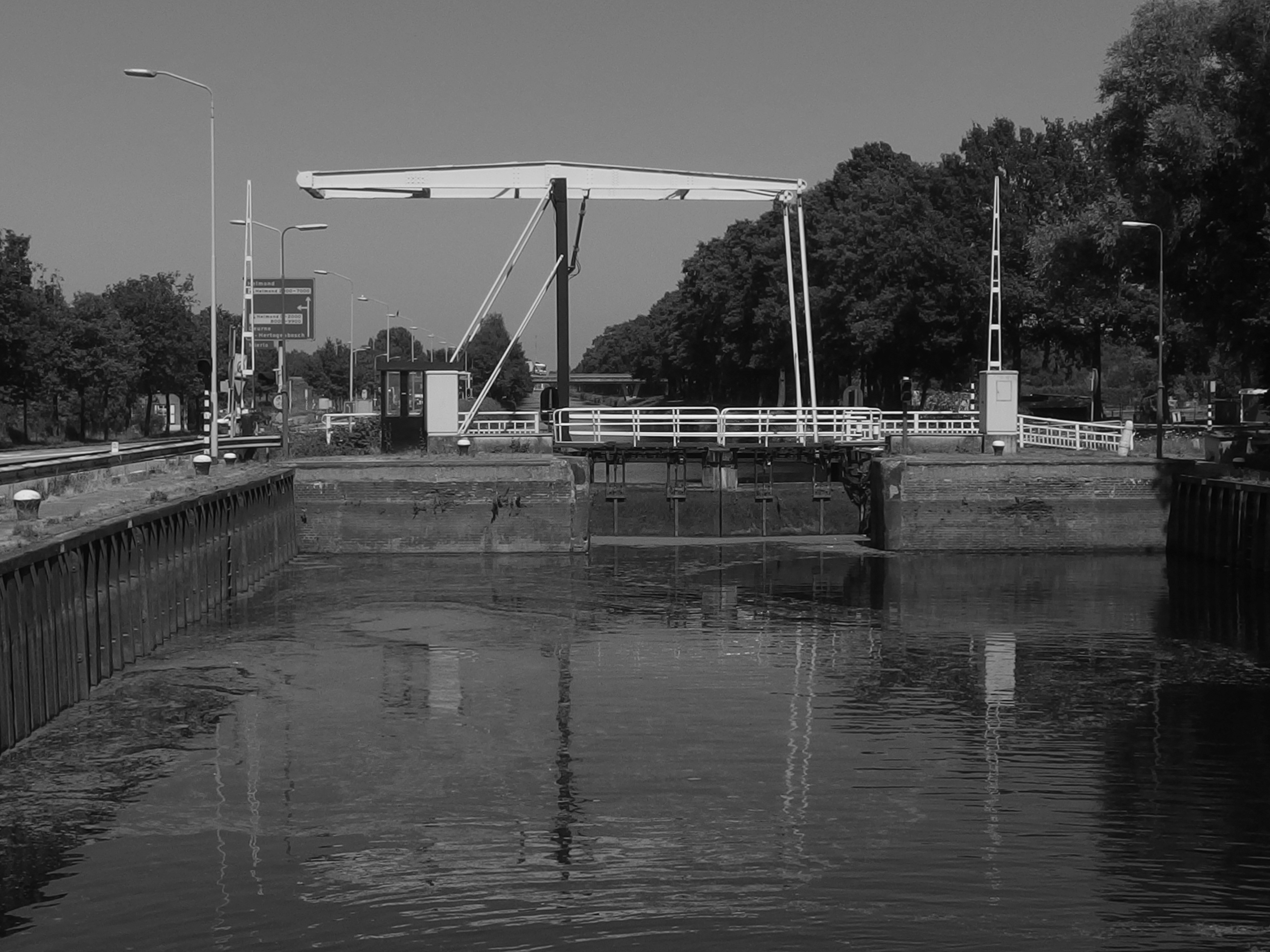
- Former lock on the Zuid-Willemsvaart

- Location in the province of North Brabant in the Netherlands Someren-Eind (Netherlands)
- Coordinates: 51°21′N 5°44′E
- Country: Netherlands
- Province: North Brabant
- Municipality: Someren

Area
  - Total: 17.61 km^{2} (6.80 sq mi)
- Elevation: 26 m (85 ft)

Population (2021)
  - Total: 3,400
  - Density: 190/km^{2} (500/sq mi)
- Time zone: UTC+1 (CET)
  - Summer (DST): UTC+2 (CEST)
- Postal code: 5712
- Dialing code: 0493

Someren-Eind is a small town, located in the southeast of North Brabant, Netherlands. It is a part of the gemeente Someren, counting 3510 residents by 2007. Someren-Eind is located near the Zuid-Willemsvaart, a canal that connects 's-Hertogenbosch and Maastricht. Someren-Eind is also known under the name D'end.

== History ==
Someren-Eind arose in 1878, when the town got its own independent parish. Before, the area had been a marsh and a part of 'de Groote Peel'. Peat workers lived in Someren-Eind because it was closer to the marsh where they stabbed peat. After several years, people from the surrounding area started building a life in Someren-Eind. And so, the tiny town (with around 60 residents) started growing into a bigger town.

== Architecture ==
Someren-Eind doesn't have a church anymore'. On that church the following text was featured: 'Laus tua in finis terrae'. Finisterra (end of the world) is a quite vague definition for a community within two kilometres from its municipality. Though the church has been demolished, the church tower is still in its original state. There are two chapels, one is located at the Boerenkamplaan, the other at the Brugstraat. The one at the Brugstraat is the Lambertuskapel (chapel), the other one is the Sint-Jozefkapel. Both of them have a special reason.

== Nature and environment ==
Someren-Eind lies within poor heather reclamation. At the east of the Zuid-Willemsvaart lies a swampy district, and the valley of the Aa, a small river. These parts are quite rough. At the northwest lies the Keelven, a forest with heather, swamps, lakes and trees.
