= Antje Frank =

German rower (born 1968)

Medal record

Women's rowing

Olympic Games

Representing Germany
Bronze medal – third place	1992 Barcelona	Coxless fours

World Rowing Championships

Representing East Germany
Bronze medal – third place	1990 Tasmania	W4-

Antje Frank (born 5 June 1968 in Bartmannshagen) is a German rower.
