= Jennifer Luff =

Australian rower

Personal information
- Nationality: Australian
- Born: 7 January 1966 (age 60) Sydney, Australia

Sport
- Sport: Rowing
- Club: Nepean Rowing Club; UTS Haberfield Rowing Club

Achievements and titles
- Olympic finals: Atlanta 1996 W8+
- National finals: Nell Slatter Trophy 1990-91; ULVA Trophy 1993-96

Jennifer Luff (born 7 January 1966) is an Australian former representative rower. In a nine year career at the elite level between 1988 and 1996 she won sixteen Australian national titles, raced for Australia at five World Rowing Championships and competed at the 1992 and the 1996 Summer Olympics. In 1990 and 1992 she won the full set of all three open women's sculling boat titles at the Australian Rowing Championships and mirrored that feat in 1995 when she won all three possible open women's titles in sweep-oared boats.

== Club and state rowing ==
Jenny Luff's senior rowing was initially from the Nepean Rowing Club and later when she made national training squads from UTS Haberfield Rowing Club and the Australian Institute of Sport. For all of her early career she was coached by Paul Rowe.

Initially a sculler, Luff first made state selection for New South Wales when she was picked as the 1990 single scull representative contesting the Nell Slatter trophy at the Interstate Regatta within the Australian Rowing Championships - she placed second. The following year Luff won the Nell Slatter Trophy in that same event. From 1993 to 1996 she raced at the annual Interstate Regatta in the New South Wales women's heavyweight four contesting the ULVA Trophy. This was before the elite heavyweight women raced for the Queen's Cup.

Luff first competed for national titles at the Australian Rowing Championships in 1988 when she raced in Nepean colours for the women's quad and double sculls championships. National championship success came in 1990 when she won three Australian titles in all three sculling classes. In the double and the quad she was partnered with Gillian Campbell with whom she would share much national success and pair up for World Championships and Olympics. At the Australian Rowing Championships in 1991 and 1992 Luff again contested all three sculling classes. She won all three in 1992, won the double and the quad in 1991 and might have achieved the unrivalled feat of winning all nine Australian sculling titles in a three year period had she not suffered an equipment failure in the semi-final of the single scull in 1991.

In 1993 Luff placed second in her single scull national title attempt and won the double scull rowing with Emmy Snook. By 1994 Luff was rowing in UTS Haberfield colours and now coached by Ellen Randell. With Snook that year she again won the national double scull title and solo, Luff finished sixth in the single scull event.

By 1995 Luff's Australian representative career was revitalised by a shift to sweep-oared boats under the coaching of Paul Thompson. At the 1995 Australian Championships she was the dominant women's sweep rower winning the coxless pair title with Georgina Douglas, the coxless four title and the senior women's eight title in an Australian selection eight stroked by Luff. The 1996 Olympic year marked Luff's final appearances at an Australian Championship and she went out on top of her game again winning the coxless pair title with Douglas, winning in the eight, placing 2nd in a coxless four and finishing third in a double scull, the boat class where her stellar career had started.

== International representative rowing ==
Jenny Luff's first Australian representative selection came in 1990 when with Gillian Campbell as the current Australian double scull champions they were selected to race the double at the 1990 World Rowing Championships in Lake Barrington, Tasmania. They placed fifth. At the 1991 World Rowing Championships in Vienna, Luff and Campbell slipped down the rankings and finished seventh overall. By the 1992 Barcelona Olympics Luff and Campbell were still seen as superior to all other domestic crews and were selected to race the double at Barcelona. They missed the A final and finished eight overall.

Luff was straight back on the water in the first year of the new Olympiad and in 1993 she raced in a single scull for Australia at the World Rowing Cups II and III. For the 1993 World Championships in Račice she was paired with Marina Hatzakis in the double scull. They finished ninth.

From 1994 on Luff rowed in the Australian women's eight in the preparation for the 1996 Summer Olympics. She was in the four seat for the 1994 World Championships when they placed sixth and rowed at six when they rowed at the 1993 World Championships to an eighth placing. The eight was forced to raced at a Lucerne qualification regatta prior to the Olympics. They got through and Luff held her seat in the middle of the boat when the final crew was selected for Athens 1996. The made the A final and finished in overall fifth place. It was Jenny Luff's final Australian representative appearance.
