= Galina Kamenova =

Bulgarian rower

Personal information
- Nationality: Bulgarian
- Born: 16 September 1970 (age 54); Vratsa, Bulgaria

Sport
- Sport: Rowing

Galina Kamenova (Bulgarian: Галина Каменова; born 16 September 1970) is a Bulgarian rower. She competed at the 1992 Summer Olympics and the 1996 Summer Olympics.
