= Cynthia Ryder =

American rower (born 1966)

Cindy Ryder
Personal information
- Full name: Cynthia Louise Ryder
- Born: August 12, 1966 (age 59) Leominster, Massachusetts, U.S.
Medal record
Women's rowing
Representing the United States
Pan American Games
Gold medal – first place	1991 Havana	Single Sculls

Cynthia Louise "Cindy" Ryder (born August 12, 1966) is an American Olympic athlete who won the gold medal in women's single sculls rowing event at the 1991 Pan American Games and participated in the 1992 Olympics in Barcelona.
