= Kerstin Förster =

German rower (born 1965)

Personal information
- Born: 9 November 1965 (age 60) Cottbus, East Germany

Sport
- Sport: Rowing
Medal record
Representing East Germany
Olympic Games
| Gold medal – first place | 1988 Seoul | Quad sculls |
World Rowing Championships
| Silver medal – second place | 1983 Duisburg | Coxed quad sculls |
| Gold medal – first place | 1986 Nottingham | Quad sculls |
| Gold medal – first place | 1987 Copenhagen | Quad sculls |
Summer Universiade
| Bronze medal – third place | 1989 Duisburg | Quad sculls |

Kerstin Förster (née Pieloth, born 9 November 1965) is a German rower.

In October 1986, she was awarded a Patriotic Order of Merit in gold (first class) for her sporting success.

She married Olaf Förster during the winter break between the 1987 and 1988 rowing seasons. He also won a gold medal at the rowing competition at the 1988 Summer Olympics.
