= Gu Xiaoli =

Chinese rower

Olympic medal record

Representing China

Rowing at the Summer Olympics
Bronze medal – third place	1992 Barcelona	Double sculls

Gu Xiaoli (Chinese: 顧曉黎, born 28 March 1971 in Liaoning, China) is a Chinese rower. She won a bronze medal in Double sculls with her partner Lu Huali at the 1992 Barcelona Olympic Games.
