= Katalin Sarlós =

Hungarian rower

Personal information
- Nationality: Hungarian
- Born: 24 August 1968 (age 57) Budapest, Hungary

Sport
- Sport: Rowing

Katalin Sarlós (born 24 August 1968) is a Hungarian rower. She competed at the 1988 Summer Olympics and the 1992 Summer Olympics.

== Early life and family ==
Her father, György Sarlós, was an Olympic silver medalist rower in the coxless four event at the 1968 Summer Olympics. Her sister Erzsébet Stephens-Sarlós won a bronze medal in the women's coxed four event at the 1984 Friendship Games.

== Rowing ==
At the 1988 Olympic Games in Seoul she was a crew member of the Hungarian boat which reached the B Final of the Women's Quadruple Sculls event.

At the 1992 Games in Barcelona she competed in the Women's Single Sculls event, reaching the C Final.

She received a Rower of the Year award from the Hungarian Rowing Association in 1987, 1988, 1989, 1990 and 1992.
