= Carol Feeney =

American rower

Personal information
- Born: October 4, 1964 (age 61) Oak Park, Illinois, U.S.
Medal record
Women's rowing
Representing United States
Olympic Games
Silver medal – second place	1992 Barcelona	Coxless fours

Carol Feeney (born October 4, 1964) is an American rower who competed in the 1992 Summer Olympics.

Feeney was born in Oak Park, Illinois. She attended college at the University of Wisconsin where she was on the 1986 Varsity Women's Eight team that won the collegiate national title at the Cincinnati Regatta in Bantam, Ohio. Feeney now works as an eighth grade science teacher at Ottoson Middle School.

== Rowing career ==
- In 1986, her team placed 4th in the World Championships, Nottingham, England (Eight).
- In 1989, her team placed 6th in the World Championships, Bled, Yugoslavia (Eight).
- In 1990, her team placed 5th in the (Coxless Fours), and 6th in the (Eight), Goodwill Games, Seattle, WA.
- In 1991, her team placed 4th in the World Championships, Vienna, Austria (Eight).
- In 1992, she was a member of the United States team that placed second in the women's Coxless Fours rowing competition in the 1992 Summer Olympics.
