= Anikó Kapócs =

Hungarian rower

Personal information
- Nationality: Hungarian
- Born: 2 June 1967 (age 57); Székesfehérvár, Hungary

Sport
- Sport: Rowing

Anikó Kapócs (born 2 June 1967) is a Hungarian rower. She competed at the 1988 Summer Olympics and the 1992 Summer Olympics.
