= Chantal Lafon =

French rower

Personal information
- Nationality: French
- Born: 14 December 1965 (age 59)

Sport
- Sport: Rowing

Chantal Lafon (born 14 December 1965) is a French rower. She competed at the 1988 Summer Olympics and the 1992 Summer Olympics.
