= Marjan Pentenga =

Dutch rower

Personal information
- Nationality: Dutch
- Born: 16 March 1964 (age 61); Groningen, Netherlands

Sport
- Sport: Rowing

Marjan Pentenga (born 16 March 1964) is a Dutch rower. She competed at the 1988 Summer Olympics and the 1992 Summer Olympics.
