= Andrea Coss =

Australian rower

Personal information
- Full name: Andrea Gay Coss
- Nationality: Australian
- Born: 6 November 1960 (age 65) Port Moresby, Territory of Papua New Guinea

Sport
- Sport: Rowing

Andrea Gay Coss (born 6 November 1960) is an Australian rower. She competed in the women's single sculls event at the 1992 Summer Olympics.
