= Christine Dubosquelle-Jullien =

French rower

Personal information
- Nationality: French
- Born: 7 May 1965 (age 60)

Sport
- Sport: Rowing

Christine Dubosquelle-Jullien (born 7 May 1965) is a French rower. She competed at the 1988 Summer Olympics and the 1992 Summer Olympics.
