= Irena Soukupová =

Czech rower (1964–2020)

Personal information
- Nationality: Czech
- Born: 9 December 1964; Prague, Czechoslovakia
- Died: 4 February 2020 (aged 55); Prague

Sport
- Country: Czechoslovakia
- Sport: Rowing

Irena Soukupová (9 December 1964 – 4 February 2020) was a Czech rower. She competed for Czechoslovakia at the 1988 Summer Olympics and the 1992 Summer Olympics.
