= Annelies Bredael =

Belgian rower (born 1965)

Personal information
- Born: 15 June 1965 (age 61) Willebroek, Antwerp, Belgium
Medal record
Women's Rowing
Representing Belgium
Olympic Games
Silver medal – second place	1992 Barcelona	Single Sculls
World Championships
Bronze medal – third place	1991 Vienna	Single sculls
Bronze medal – third place	1994 Indianapolis	Single sculls
Bronze medal – third place	1995 Tampere	Single sculls

Annelies Bredael (born 15 June 1965 in Willebroek, Antwerp) is a Belgian rower. She participated in 3 consecutive Summer Olympic Games in Seoul, Barcelona and Atlanta In 1992, she won the silver medal in rowing, single scull at the Summer Olympics in Barcelona.
