= Lu Huali =

Chinese rower

- Citizenship: Chinese
- Occupation: Rower

Olympic medal record

Representing China

Rowing at the Summer Olympics
Bronze medal – third place	1992 Barcelona	Double sculls

Lu Huali (路华利; born 14 March 1972) is a Chinese rower. She won a bronze medal in Double sculls with her partner Gu Xiaoli at the 1992 Barcelona Olympic Games.
