= Ľubica Novotníková-Kurhajcová =

Czech rower

Personal information
- Nationality: Slovak
- Born: 13 June 1964 (age 60); Bratislava, Czechoslovakia

Sport
- Sport: Rowing

Ľubica Novotníková-Kurhajcová (born 13 June 1964) is a Slovak rower. She competed at the 1988 Summer Olympics and the 1992 Summer Olympics.
