= Rowing at the 1996 Summer Olympics – Women's quadruple sculls =

Women's quadruple sculls at the Games of the XXVI Olympiad
- Date: 22–28 July 1996
- Competitors: 40 from 10 nations

Medalists
1st place, gold medalist(s)		Katrin Rutschow; Jana Sorgers; Kerstin Köppen; Kathrin Boron	Germany
2nd place, silver medalist(s)		Svitlana Maziy; Dina Miftakhutdynova; Inna Frolova; Olena Ronzhyna	Ukraine
3rd place, bronze medalist(s)		Laryssa Biesenthal; Diane O'Grady; Kathleen Heddle; Marnie McBean	Canada

The women's quadruple sculls competition at the 1996 Summer Olympics in Atlanta, Georgia took place at Lake Lanier.

== Competition format ==
The competition consisted of two main rounds (heats and finals) as well as a repechage. The 10 boats were divided into two heats for the first round, with 5 boats in each heat. The first-place boat in each heat (2 boats total) advanced directly to the "A" final. The remaining 8 boats were placed in the repechage. The repechage featured two heats, with 4 boats in each heat. The top two boats in each repechage heat (4 boats total) advanced to the "A" final, while the remaining 4 boats (3rd and 4th placers in the repechage heats) were sent to the "B" final.

The boats in the "A" final competed for medals and 4th through 6th place; the boats in the "B" final competed for 7th through 10th.

All races were over a 2000-metre course.

== Results ==
=== Heats ===
==== Heat 1 ====
Rank	Rowers	Nation	Time	Notes
1	Laryssa Biesenthal; Diane O'Grady; Kathleen Heddle; Marnie McBean	Canada	6:39.32	QA
2	Irene Eijs; Meike van Driel; Nelleke Penninx; Eeke van Nes	Netherlands	6:43.76	R
3	Cao Mianying; Zhang Xiuyun; Liu Xirong; Gu Xiaoli	China	6:46.00	R
4	Sally Newmarch; Jane Robinson; Marina Hatzakis; Bronwyn Roye	Australia	6:48.58	R
5	Angela Alupei; Viorica Susanu; Iulia Bulie; Doina Robu	Romania	6:50.93	R

==== Heat 2 ====
Rank	Rowers	Nation	Time	Notes
1	Katrin Rutschow-Stomporowski; Jana Sorgers-Rau; Kerstin Köppen; Kathrin Boron	Germany	6:36.00	QA
2	Irina Fedotova; Oksana Dorodnova; Larisa Merk; Margarita Bogdanova	Russia	6:37.59	R
3	Inger Pors Olsen; Ulla Werner Hansen; Sarah Lauritzen; Dorthe Pedersen	Denmark	6:38.25	R
4	Svitlana Maziy; Dina Miftakhutdynova; Inna Frolova; Olena Ronzhyna	Ukraine	6:46.17	R
5	Dré Thies; Cécile Tucker; Cathy Symon; Julia Chilicki	United States	6:54.73	R

=== Repechage ===
==== Repechage 1 ====
Rank	Rowers	Nation	Time	Notes
1	Inger Pors Olsen; Ulla Werner Hansen; Sarah Lauritzen; Dorthe Pedersen	Denmark	6:15.45	QA
2	Irene Eijs; Meike van Driel; Nelleke Penninx; Eeke van Nes	Netherlands	6:15.92	QA
3	Sally Newmarch; Jane Robinson; Marina Hatzakis; Bronwyn Roye	Australia	6:16.85	QB
4	Dré Thies; Cécile Tucker; Cathy Symon; Julia Chilicki	United States	6:25.54	QB

==== Repechage 2 ====
Rank	Rowers	Nation	Time	Notes
1	Svitlana Maziy; Dina Miftakhutdynova; Inna Frolova; Olena Ronzhyna	Ukraine	6:19.11	QA
2	Cao Mianying; Zhang Xiuyun; Liu Xirong; Gu Xiaoli	China	6:21.23	QA
3	Angela Alupei; Viorica Susanu; Iulia Bulie; Doina Robu	Romania	6:26.27	QB
–	Irina Fedotova; Oksana Dorodnova; Larisa Merk; Margarita Bogdanova	Russia	DNS	QB

=== Finals ===
==== Final B ====
Rank	Rowers	Nation	Time
7	Irina Fedotova; Oksana Dorodnova; Larisa Merk; Margarita Bogdanova	Russia	6:24.10
8	Dré Thies; Cécile Tucker; Cathy Symon; Julia Chilicki	United States	6:24.49
9	Sally Newmarch; Jane Robinson; Marina Hatzakis; Bronwyn Roye	Australia	6:25.73
10	Angela Alupei; Viorica Susanu; Iulia Bulie; Doina Robu	Romania	6:31.35

==== Final A ====
Rank	Rowers	Nation	Time
1st place, gold medalist(s)	Katrin Rutschow-Stomporowski; Jana Sorgers-Rau; Kerstin Köppen; Kathrin Boron	Germany	6:27.44
2nd place, silver medalist(s)	Svitlana Maziy; Dina Miftakhutdynova; Inna Frolova; Olena Ronzhyna	Ukraine	6:30.36
3rd place, bronze medalist(s)	Laryssa Biesenthal; Diane O'Grady; Kathleen Heddle; Marnie McBean	Canada	6:30.38
4	Inger Pors Olsen; Ulla Werner Hansen; Sarah Lauritzen; Dorthe Pedersen	Denmark	6:30.92
5	Cao Mianying; Zhang Xiuyun; Liu Xirong; Gu Xiaoli	China	6:31.10
6	Irene Eijs; Meike van Driel; Nelleke Penninx; Eeke van Nes	Netherlands	6:35.54
