= Rowing at the 2000 Summer Olympics – Women's double sculls =

Women's double sculls at the Games of the XXVII Olympiad
- Venue: Sydney International Regatta Centre
- Date: 17–23 September 2000
- Competitors: 20 from 10 nations
- Winning time: 6:55.44

Medalists
1st place, gold medalist(s)		Kathrin Boron; Jana Thieme	Germany
2nd place, silver medalist(s)		Pieta van Dishoeck; Eeke van Nes	Netherlands
3rd place, bronze medalist(s)		Kristina Poplavskaja; Birutė Šakickienė	Lithuania

The women's double sculls competition during the 2000 Summer Olympics in Sydney, Australia took place at Sydney International Regatta Centre.

== Competition format ==
This rowing event is a double scull event, meaning that each boat is propelled by a pair of rowers. The "scull" portion means that each rower uses two oars, one on each side of the boat; this contrasts with sweep rowing in which each rower has one oar and rows on only one side. The competition consists of multiple rounds. Finals were held to determine the placing of each boat; these finals were given letters with those nearer to the beginning of the alphabet meaning a better ranking. Semifinals were named based on which finals they fed, with each semifinal having two possible finals.

With 10 boats in heats, the best boats qualify directly for "Final A". All other boats progress to the repechage round, which offers a second chance to qualify for "Final A". Unsuccessful boats from the repechage must proceed to final B, which determines the last four places, from 7–10. The final ranking for this event was based on the order of finish. The top three teams earned Olympic medals for placing first, second, and third, while the remaining "Final A" teams placed fourth through sixth, according to their final finish.

== Schedule ==
All times are Australian Time (UTC+10)

Date	Time	Round
Sunday, 17 September 2000	10:40	Heats
Tuesday, 19 September 2000	10:20	Repechages
Friday, 22 September 2000	10:50	Final B
Saturday, 23 September 2000	09:50	Final

== Results ==
=== Heats ===
The winner of each heat advanced to Final A, remainder goes to the repechage.

==== Heat 1 ====
Rank	Rower	Country	Time	Notes
1	Kathrin Boron; Jana Thieme	Germany	7:04.74	Q
2	Pieta van Dishoeck; Eeke van Nes	Netherlands	7:10.55	R
3	Ruth Davidon; Carol Skricki	United States	7:15.48	R
4	Marina Hatzakis; Bronwyn Roye	Australia	7:18.40	R
5	Frances Houghton; Sarah Winckless	Great Britain	7:24.07	R

==== Heat 2 ====
Rank	Rower	Country	Time	Notes
1	Veronica Cogeanu-Cochela; Elisabeta Oleniuc-Lipă	Romania	7:08.70	Q
2	Kristina Poplavskaja; Birutė Šakickienė	Lithuania	7:13.04	R
3	Gaëlle Buniet; Céline Garcia	France	7:15.39	R
4	Carolina Lüthi; Bernadette Wicki	Switzerland	7:16.94	R
5	Liu Lin; Sun Guangxia	China	7:33.17	R

=== Repechage ===
First two qualify to Final A, the remainder to final B.

==== Repechage 1 ====
Rank	Rower	Country	Time	Notes
1	Pieta van Dishoeck; Eeke van Nes	Netherlands	7:08.98	A
2	Marina Hatzakis; Bronwyn Roye	Australia	7:10.09	A
3	Gaëlle Buniet; Céline Garcia	France	7:10.98	B
4	Liu Lin; Sun Guangxia	China	7:32.36	B

==== Repechage 2 ====
Rank	Rower	Country	Time	Notes
1	Kristina Poplavskaja; Birutė Šakickienė	Lithuania	7:08.18	A
2	Ruth Davidon; Carol Skricki	United States	7:08.99	A
3	Frances Houghton; Sarah Winckless	Great Britain	7:14.03	B
4	Carolina Lüthi; Bernadette Wicki	Switzerland	7:15.09	B

=== Finals ===
==== Final B ====
Rank	Rower	Country	Time	Notes
1	Carolina Lüthi; Bernadette Wicki	Switzerland	7:02.82	
2	Gaëlle Buniet; Céline Garcia	France	7:04.73	
3	Frances Houghton; Sarah Winckless	Great Britain	7:07.62	
4	Liu Lin; Sun Guangxia	China	7:23.74	

==== Final A ====
Rank	Rower	Country	Time	Notes
1st place, gold medalist(s)	Kathrin Boron; Jana Thieme	Germany	6:55.44	
2nd place, silver medalist(s)	Pieta van Dishoeck; Eeke van Nes	Netherlands	7:00.36	
3rd place, bronze medalist(s)	Kristina Poplavskaja; Birutė Šakickienė	Lithuania	7:01.71	
4	Ruth Davidon; Carol Skricki	United States	7:02.61	
5	Veronica Cogeanu-Cochela; Elisabeta Oleniuc-Lipă	Romania	7:05.05	
6	Marina Hatzakis; Bronwyn Roye	Australia	7:05.35	
