= Rowing at the 2000 Summer Olympics – Women's quadruple sculls =

Women's quadruple sculls at the Games of the XXVII Olympiad
- Venue: Sydney International Regatta Centre
- Date: 18–24 September 2000
- Competitors: 36 from 9 nations
- Winning time: 6:19.58

Medalists
1st place, gold medalist(s)		Meike Evers; Kerstin Kowalski; Manja Kowalski; Manuela Lutze	Germany
2nd place, silver medalist(s)		Guin Batten; Miriam Batten; Katherine Grainger; Gillian Lindsay	Great Britain
3rd place, bronze medalist(s)		Oksana Dorodnova; Irina Fedotova; Yuliya Levina; Larisa Merk	Russia

The women's quadruple sculls competition at the 2000 Summer Olympics in Sydney, Australia took place at the Sydney International Regatta Centre.

== Competition format ==
This rowing event is a quadruple scull event, meaning that each boat is propelled by four rowers. The "scull" portion means that each rower uses two oars, one on each side of the boat; this contrasts with sweep rowing in which each rower has one oar and rows on only one side. The competition consisted of multiple rounds. Finals were held to determine the placing of each boat; these finals were given letters with those nearer to the beginning of the alphabet meaning a better ranking.

With 9 boats in heats, the best boats qualify directly for "Final A". All other boats progress to the repechage round, which offers a second chance to qualify for "Final A". Unsuccessful boats from the repechage must proceed to final B, which determines the last three places, from 7–9. The final ranking for this event was based on the order of finish. The top three teams earned Olympic medals for placing first, second, and third, while the remaining "Final A" teams placed fourth through sixth, according to their final finish.

== Schedule ==
All times are Australian Time (UTC+10)

Date	Time	Round
Monday, 18 September 2000	10:10	Heats
Wednesday, 20 September 2000	09:50	Repechages
Saturday, 23 September 2000	11:40	Final B
Sunday, 24 September 2000	09:30	Final

== Results ==
=== Heats ===
The winner of each heat advanced to Final A, remainder goes to the repechage.

==== Heat 1 ====
Rank	Rower	Country	Time	Notes
1	Oksana Dorodnova, Irina Fedotova, Yuliya Levina, Larisa Merk	Russia	6:31.77	Q
2	Guin Batten, Miriam Batten, Katherine Grainger, Gillian Lindsay	Great Britain	6:35.09	R
3	Jennifer Dore, Hilary Gehman, Laurel Korholz, Kelly Salchow	United States	6:42.12	R
4	Han Jing, Liu Lijuan, Liu Lin, Sun Guangxia	China	6:49.84	R
5	Aurica Bărăscu, Elena Popa, Crina Violeta Serediuc, Doina Spîrcu	Romania	6:52.01	R

==== Heat 2 ====
Rank	Rower	Country	Time	Notes
1	Meike Evers, Kerstin Kowalski, Manja Kowalski, Manuela Lutze	Germany	6:25.98	Q
2	Svitlana Maziy, Dina Miftakhutdynova, Olena Ronzhyna, Tetiana Ustiuzhanina	Ukraine	6:28.17	R
3	Bianca Carstensen, Katrin Gleie, Sarah Lauritzen, Dorthe Pedersen	Denmark	6:35.39	R
4	Monique Heinke, Kerry Knowler, Sally Robbins, Julia Wilson	Australia	6:47.01	R

=== Repechage ===
First two qualify to Final A, the remainder to final B.

==== Repechage 1 ====
Rank	Rower	Country	Time	Notes
1	Guin Batten, Miriam Batten, Katherine Grainger, Gillian Lindsay	Great Britain	6:30.96	A
2	Bianca Carstensen, Katrin Gleie, Sarah Lauritzen, Dorthe Pedersen	Denmark	6:35.76	A
3	Han Jing, Liu Lijuan, Liu Lin, Sun Guangxia	China	6:52.47	B

==== Repechage 2 ====
Rank	Rower	Country	Time	Notes
1	Svitlana Maziy, Dina Miftakhutdynova, Olena Ronzhyna, Tetiana Ustiuzhanina	Ukraine	6:29.41	A
2	Jennifer Dore, Hilary Gehman, Laurel Korholz, Kelly Salchow	United States	6:34.63	A
3	Monique Heinke, Kerry Knowler, Sally Robbins, Julia Wilson	Australia	6:42.22	B
4	Aurica Bărăscu, Elena Popa, Crina Violeta Serediuc, Doina Spîrcu	Romania	6:50.34	B

=== Finals ===
==== Final B ====
Rank	Rower	Country	Time	Notes
1	Monique Heinke, Kerry Knowler, Sally Robbins, Julia Wilson	Australia	6:37.22	
2	Han Jing, Liu Lijuan, Liu Lin, Sun Guangxia	China	6:39.51	
3	Aurica Bărăscu, Elena Popa, Crina Violeta Serediuc, Doina Spîrcu	Romania	6:46.78	

==== Final A ====
Rank	Rower	Country	Time	Notes
1st place, gold medalist(s)	Meike Evers, Kerstin Kowalski, Manja Kowalski, Manuela Lutze	Germany	6:19.58	
2nd place, silver medalist(s)	Guin Batten, Miriam Batten, Katherine Grainger, Gillian Lindsay	Great Britain	6:21.64	
3rd place, bronze medalist(s)	Oksana Dorodnova, Irina Fedotova, Yuliya Levina, Larisa Merk	Russia	6:21.65	
4	Svitlana Maziy, Dina Miftakhutdynova, Olena Ronzhyna, Tetiana Ustiuzhanina	Ukraine	6:25.71	
5	Jennifer Dore, Hilary Gehman, Laurel Korholz, Kelly Salchow	United States	6:30.26	
6	Bianca Carstensen, Katrin Gleie, Sarah Lauritzen, Dorthe Pedersen	Denmark	6:31.30	
