= Rowing at the 1996 Summer Olympics – Women's single sculls =

Women's single sculls at the Games of the XXVI Olympiad
- Venue: Lake Lanier
- Date: 21–27 July 1996
- Competitors: 17 from 17 nations

Medalists
1st place, gold medalist(s)		Ekaterina Khodotovich	Belarus
2nd place, silver medalist(s)		Silken Laumann	Canada
3rd place, bronze medalist(s)		Trine Hansen	Denmark

The Women's single sculls competition at the 1996 Summer Olympics took place at Lake Lanier, Atlanta, United States of America. The event was held from 21 to 27 July 1996.

== Heats ==
The winner in each heat advanced directly to the semi-finals. The remaining rowers must compete in the repechage for the remaining spots in semi-finals.

=== Heat 1 ===
Rank	Athlete Name	Country	Time	Notes
1	Maria Brandin	Sweden	8:00.70	SF
2	Rumyana Neykova	Bulgaria	8:12.85	R
3	Tonia Svaier	Greece	8:17.49	R
4	Birutė Šakickienė	Lithuania	8:21.78	R
5	Meike Evers	Germany	8:24.14	R
6	Ana Urbano	Argentina	8:42.59	R

=== Heat 2 ===
Rank	Athlete Name	Country	Time	Notes
1	Ekaterina Khodotovich	Belarus	8:03.73	SF
2	Annelies Bredael	Belgium	8:08.40	R
3	Ruth Davidon	United States	8:09.78	R
4	Céline Garcia	France	8:10.22	R
5	Elisabeta Lipă	Romania	8:22.92	R
6	Samia Hireche	Algeria	9:08.31	R

=== Heat 3 ===
Rank	Athlete Name	Country	Time	Notes
1	Trine Hansen	Denmark	8:02.06	SF
2	Silken Laumann	Canada	8:10.57	R
3	Liu Xiaochun	China	8:12.82	R
4	Guin Batten	Great Britain	8:54.05	R
5	Laila Finska-Bezerra	Finland	8:31.56	R

== Repechage ==
First three rowers in each race advanced to Semifinal 1 or 2, the rest went to Final C.

=== Repechage 1 ===
Rank	Athlete Name	Country	Time	Notes
1	Ruth Davidon	United States	8:33.73	S
2	Rumyana Neykova	Bulgaria	8:41.37	S
3	Guin Batten	Great Britain	8:44.73	S
4	Meike Evers	Germany	8:54.05	FC
5	Samia Hireche	Algeria	9:28.41	FC

=== Repechage 2 ===
Rank	Athlete Name	Country	Time	Notes
1	Elisabeta Lipă	Romania	8:30.97	S
2	Annelies Bredael	Belgium	8:33.72	S
3	Liu Xiaochun	China	8:37.01	S
4	Birutė Šakickienė	Lithuania	8:41.08	FC

=== Repechage 3 ===
Rank	Athlete Name	Country	Time	Notes
1	Silken Laumann	Canada	8:28.88	S
2	Céline Garcia	France	8:32.58	S
3	Laila Finska-Bezerra	Finland	8:35.72	S
4	Tonia Svaier	Greece	8:49.44	FC
5	Ana Urbano	Argentina	9:04.66	FC

== Semifinal ==
First three rowers from each semifinal advanced to Final A, while the others advanced to Final B.

=== Semifinal 1 ===
Rank	Athlete Name	Country	Time	Notes
1	Silken Laumann	Canada	7:57.68	FA
2	Ekaterina Khodotovich	Belarus	8:00.02	FA
3	Maria Brandin	Sweden	8:01.55	FA
4	Annelies Bredael	Belgium	8:05.78	FB
5	Rumyana Neykova	Bulgaria	8:15.63	FB
6	Laila Finska-Bezerra	Finland	8:25.00	FB

=== Semifinal 2 ===
Rank	Athlete Name	Country	Time	Notes
1	Trine Hansen	Denmark	7:53.45	FA
2	Ruth Davidon	United States	7:54.97	FA
3	Guin Batten	Great Britain	7:56.61	FA
4	Elisabeta Lipă	Romania	8:01.84	FB
5	Céline Garcia	France	8:13.37	FB
6	Liu Xiaochun	China	8:15.83	FB

== Final ==
=== Final C ===
Rank	Athlete Name	Country	Time	Notes
13	Meike Evers	Germany	8:16.51	
14	Birutė Šakickienė	Lithuania	8:17.80	
15	Tonia Svaier	Greece	8:25.83	
16	Ana Urbano	Argentina	8:41.51	
17	Samia Hireche	Algeria	9:09.92	

=== Final B ===
Rank	Athlete Name	Country	Time	Notes
7	Annelies Bredael	Belgium	7:25.83	
8	Rumyana Neykova	Bulgaria	7:27.77	
9	Elisabeta Lipă	Romania	7:28.79	
10	Céline Garcia	France	7:33.30	
11	Liu Xiaochun	China	7:33.67	
12	Laila Finska-Bezerra	Finland	7:34.85	

=== Final A ===
Rank	Athlete Name	Country	Time	Notes
1st place, gold medalist(s)	Ekaterina Khodotovich	Belarus	7:32.31	
2nd place, silver medalist(s)	Silken Laumann	Canada	7:35.15	
3rd place, bronze medalist(s)	Trine Hansen	Denmark	7:37.20	
4	Maria Brandin	Sweden	7:42.58	
5	Guin Batten	Great Britain	7:45.08	
6	Ruth Davidon	United States	7:46.47	

== Sources ==
- The Official Report of the Centennial Olympic Games Volume Three ˗ The Competition Results (PDF) (PDF). p. 320. Archived from the original (PDF) on 27 September 2007.
