= Min (Korean surname) =

- Hangul: 민
- Hanja: 閔
- RR: Min
- MR: Min

Min is an uncommon Korean family name.

== Distribution ==
The Korean family name Min is written with only one hanja (閔). The 2000 census found 142,752 people in 43,887 households belonging to this clan (about 0.35% of the South Korean population at the time), making it the 47th-most-common surname among the 286 surnames listed in the census. This represented a growth of 3.8 percent from 137,317 in the 1985 census, a far smaller increase than the fifteen percent growth in the overall South Korean population over the same period.

The family name Min has one major clan lineage, the Yeoheung Min clan, whose bon-gwan (ancestral seat) is present-day Yeoju, Gyeonggi Province. Yeoju has traditionally been called Yeoheung (during Joseon dynasty) and Hwangryeo (Goryeo dynasty), and the Min clan has accordingly been referred to as Hwangryeo Min clan or other variations during different times in history.

The Yeoheung Min clan is subdivided into 46 branches ("Pa"). In addition to the Yeoheung Mins, the Korean census lists families using the syllable Min in their family names including the Gyeongju Min clan and Yeongju Min clan. These clans are not listed in the official family tree (Jokbo) of the Yeoheung Min clan and their origins are unverified.

== Notable people ==
People with the family name Min include:

- Queen Wongyeong (1365–1420), queen consort of King Taejong
- Queen Inhyeon (1667–1701), queen consort of King Sukjong of Joseon
- Stephen Min Kuk-ka (1787–1840), Korean Roman Catholic saint
- Empress Myeongseong (1851–1895), queen consort of King Gojong of Joseon
- Min Young-hwan (1861–1905), Korean Empire official
- Min Sang-ho (1870–1933), Korean Empire soldier and pro-Japanese collaborator
- Empress Sunmyeong (1872–1907), princess consort of Emperor Sunjong of Korea
- Min Yeong-chan (1873–1948), Korean Empire official
- Min Won-sik (1886–1921), Korean male journalist of the Japanese colonial period
- Aleksandr Min (1915–1944), first Korean awarded the title of Hero of the Soviet Union
- Min Byung-dae (1918–1983), South Korean male football defender
- Min Hyun-sik (born 1946), South Korean male architect
- Min Young-sam (born 1954), South Korean sport shooter
- Min Byung-doo (born 1958), South Korean male politician
- Min Gyeong-seung (born 1962), South Korean male fencer
- Min Hae-kyung (born 1962), South Korean female singer
- Min Se-hun (born 1963), South Korean male discus thrower
- Min Joon-ki (born 1968), South Korean male film director
- Janice Min (born 1969), American female writer of Korean descent
- Min Hye-sook (born 1970), South Korean female team handball player
- Min Kyu-dong (born 1970), South Korean male film director
- Min Kyung-gab (born 1970), South Korean male wrestler
- Min Byeong-sun (born 1974), South Korean male rower
- Klara Min (born 1976), South Korean female pianist
- Min Young-ki (born 1976), South Korean male football defender
- Min Hee-jin (born 1979), South Korean female creative director
- Min Ryoung (born 1982), South Korean male short track speed skater
- Min Kyung-hoon (born 1984), South Korean male singer
- Min Ji-hyun (born 1984), South Korean actress
- Min Young-won (born Jo Hyo-kyung, 1984), South Korean actress
- Min Jin-woong (born 1986), South Korean actor
- Zizo (born Min Ju-hong, 1986), South Korean male rapper
- Min Hyo-rin (born Jung Eun-ran, 1986), South Korean actress
- Jenna Ushkowitz (born Min Ji, 1986), Korean-American actress
- Min Byung-hun (born 1987), South Korean male baseball outfielder
- Min Na-on (born 1988), South Korean female golfer
- Min Sun-ye (born 1989), South Korean female singer, former member of Wonder Girls
- Min Ok-ju (born 1990), North Korean female volleyball player
- Justin H. Min (born 1990), American actor
- Min Sang-gi (born 1991), South Korean male football midfielder
- Suga (born Min Yoon-gi, 1993), South Korean rapper, member of BTS
- Min Do-hee (born 1994), South Korean actress
- Grace Min (born 1994), American female tennis player of Korean descent
- Yura Min (born 1995), South Korean female ice dancer
- Min Kyeong-ho (born 1996), South Korean male track cyclist
- Min Jiwoon (born 1999), South Korean singer and songwriter
- Anna Min, 21st-century American photographer of Korean descent
- Min Jong-gi, 21st-century South Korean male politician
- Pyong Gap Min, 21st-century American sociologist

== See also ==
- List of Korean family names
- Yeoheung Min clan
