= Rowing at the 1996 Summer Olympics – Women's double sculls =

Women's double sculls at the Games of the XXVI Olympiad
- Date: 21–27 July 1996
- Competitors: 28 from 14 nations

Medalists
| 1st place, gold medalist(s) | | Kathleen Heddle; Marnie McBean | Canada |
| 2nd place, silver medalist(s) | | Zhang Xiuyun; Cao Mianying | China |
| 3rd place, bronze medalist(s) | | Irene Eijs; Eeke van Nes | Netherlands |

The women's double sculls competition at the 1996 Summer Olympics in Atlanta, Georgia took place at Lake Lanier.

== Heats ==
- SA/B denotes qualification to Semifinal A/B.
- R denotes qualification to Repechage.

=== Heat 1 ===
| Rank | Rowers | Country | Time | Notes |
|---|---|---|---|---|
| 1 | Kathleen Heddle; Marnie McBean | Canada | 7:23.07 | SA/B |
| 2 | Zhang Xiuyun; Cao Mianying | China | 7:26.47 | SA/B |
| 3 | Michelle Knox-Zaloom; Jennifer Devine | United States | 7:31.98 | SA/B |
| 4 | Sanita Ozoliņa; Liene Lutere | Latvia | 7:36.18 | R |
| 5 | Erika Bello; Marianna Barelli | Italy | 7:47.07 | R |

=== Heat 2 ===
| Rank | Rowers | Country | Time | Notes |
|---|---|---|---|---|
| 1 | Marina Hatzakis; Bronwyn Roye | Australia | 7:20.10 | SA/B |
| 2 | Jana Thieme; Manuela Lutze | Germany | 7:21.13 | SA/B |
| 3 | Daniela Oronova; Galina Kamenova | Bulgaria | 7:36.48 | SA/B |
| 4 | Dolores Amaya; María Garisoain | Argentina | 7:57.05 | R |
| 5 | Min Byeong-sun; Park Yeong-ja | South Korea | 8:34.55 | R |

=== Heat 3 ===
| Rank | Rowers | Country | Time | Notes |
|---|---|---|---|---|
| 1 | Irene Eijs; Eeke van Nes | Netherlands | 7:23.12 | SA/B |
| 2 | Philippa Baker; Brenda Lawson | New Zealand | 7:26.83 | SA/B |
| 3 | Tetiana Ustiuzhanina; Olena Reutova | Ukraine | 7:27.12 | SA/B |
| 4 | Kristine Bjerknes; Kristine Klaveness | Norway | 7:30.32 | R |

== Repechage ==
First three qualify to the semifinals, the remainder are eliminated.

=== Repechage 1 ===
| Rank | Rowers | Country | Time | Notes |
|---|---|---|---|---|
| 1 | Kristine Bjerknes; Kristine Klaveness | Norway | 7:43.75 | SA/B |
| 2 | Sanita Ozoliņa; Liene Lutere | Latvia | 7:48.02 | SA/B |
| 3 | Erika Bello; Marianna Barelli | Italy | 7:52.07 | SA/B |
| 4 | Dolores Amaya; María Garisoain | Argentina | 8:09.24 | E |
| 5 | Min Byeong-sun; Park Yeong-ja | South Korea | 8:44.34 | E |

== Semi-finals ==
- A denotes qualification to Final A.
- B denotes qualification to Final B.

=== Semi-final 1 ===
| Rank | Rowers | Country | Time | Notes |
|---|---|---|---|---|
| 1 | Kathleen Heddle; Marnie McBean | Canada | 7:11.21 | A |
| 2 | Philippa Baker; Brenda Lawson | New Zealand | 7:15.57 | A |
| 3 | Marina Hatzakis; Bronwyn Roye | Australia | 7:15.58 | A |
| 4 | Daniela Oronova; Galina Kamenova | Bulgaria | 7:18.33 | B |
| 5 | Michelle Knox-Zaloom; Jennifer Devine | United States | 7:21.97 | B |
| 6 | Erika Bello; Marianna Barelli | Italy | 7:38.85 | B |

=== Semi-final 2 ===
| Rank | Rowers | Country | Time | Notes |
|---|---|---|---|---|
| 1 | Zhang Xiuyun; Cao Mianying | China | 7:15.47 | A |
| 2 | Irene Eijs; Eeke van Nes | Netherlands | 7:16.39 | A |
| 3 | Jana Thieme; Manuela Lutze | Germany | 7:19.62 | A |
| 4 | Kristine Bjerknes; Kristine Klaveness | Norway | 7:26.24 | B |
| 5 | Tetiana Ustiuzhanina; Olena Reutova | Ukraine | 7:28.53 | B |
| 6 | Sanita Ozoliņa; Liene Lutere | Latvia | 7:32.00 | B |

== Finals ==
=== Final B ===
| Rank | Rowers | Country | Time | Notes |
|---|---|---|---|---|
| 1 | Kristine Bjerknes; Kristine Klaveness | Norway | 6:53.31 | |
| 2 | Tetiana Ustiuzhanina; Olena Reutova | Ukraine | 6:53.96 | |
| 3 | Michelle Knox-Zaloom; Jennifer Devine | United States | 6:58.78 | |
| 4 | Daniela Oronova; Galina Kamenova | Bulgaria | 7:00.14 | |
| 5 | Sanita Ozoliņa; Liene Lutere | Latvia | 7:06.47 | |
| 6 | Erika Bello; Marianna Barelli | Italy | 7:16.54 | |

=== Final A ===
| Rank | Rowers | Country | Time | Notes |
|---|---|---|---|---|
| 1st place, gold medalist(s) | Kathleen Heddle; Marnie McBean | Canada | 6:56.84 | |
| 2nd place, silver medalist(s) | Zhang Xiuyun; Cao Mianying | China | 6:58.35 | |
| 3rd place, bronze medalist(s) | Irene Eijs; Eeke van Nes | Netherlands | 6:58.74 | |
| 4 | Marina Hatzakis; Bronwyn Roye | Australia | 7:01.26 | |
| 5 | Jana Thieme; Manuela Lutze | Germany | 7:04.14 | |
| 6 | Philippa Baker; Brenda Lawson | New Zealand | 7:09.92 | B |
