= Davidon =

Davidon is a surname. Notable people with the surname include:

- Ruth Davidon (born 1964), American rower
- William C. Davidon (1927–2013), American physicist and activist

== See also ==
- Davidson (name)
