= History of the United States at the Olympics =

The United States has participated in nearly every modern Olympic Games since 1896 and has won more medals than any other nation. American athletes have competed in both the Summer and Winter Games, with U.S. Olympic history shaped by periods of athletic dominance, wartime interruptions, and political boycotts.

== Early Olympics (1896–1912) ==
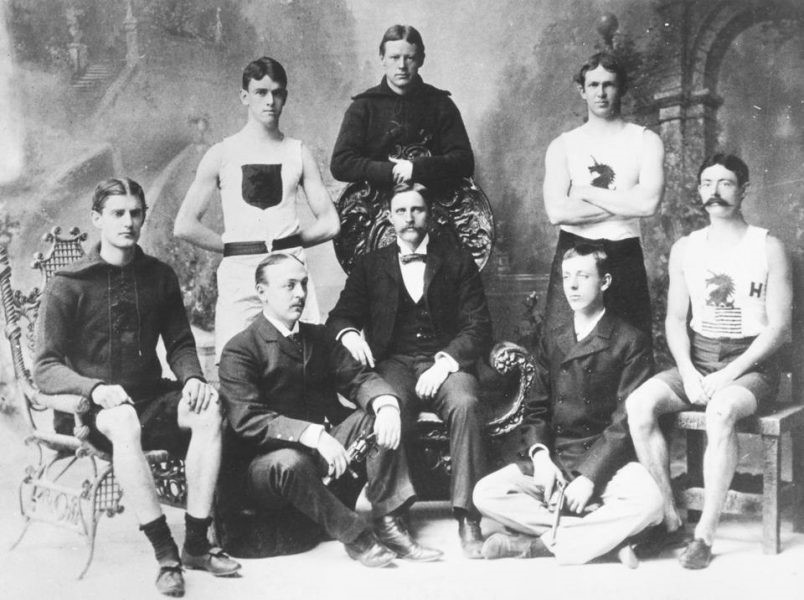
Several members of America's first Olympic team in 1896. Standing: T.E. Burke, Thomas P. Curtis, Ellery H. Clark. Seated: W.W. Hoyt, Sumner Paine, trainer John Graham, John B. Paine, Arthur C. Blake.

At the first modern Olympic Games in 1896, the United States was the only non-European country to compete. Despite their small team of fourteen athletes, the Americans won 11 events—more gold medals than any other country. Host nation Greece fielded 169 athletes and earned 46 medals overall, while the United States claimed 20. Though the Greeks led the total medal count, the U.S. topped the gold medal tally, edging out Greece's 10 golds.

James Connolly became the first modern Olympic champion by winning the triple jump, and Thomas Burke won three gold medals in various track events, assuming the title of the most successful athlete of the 1896 Games. Robert Garrett won two gold medals in the discus throw and shot put events, demonstrating American strength in athletics.

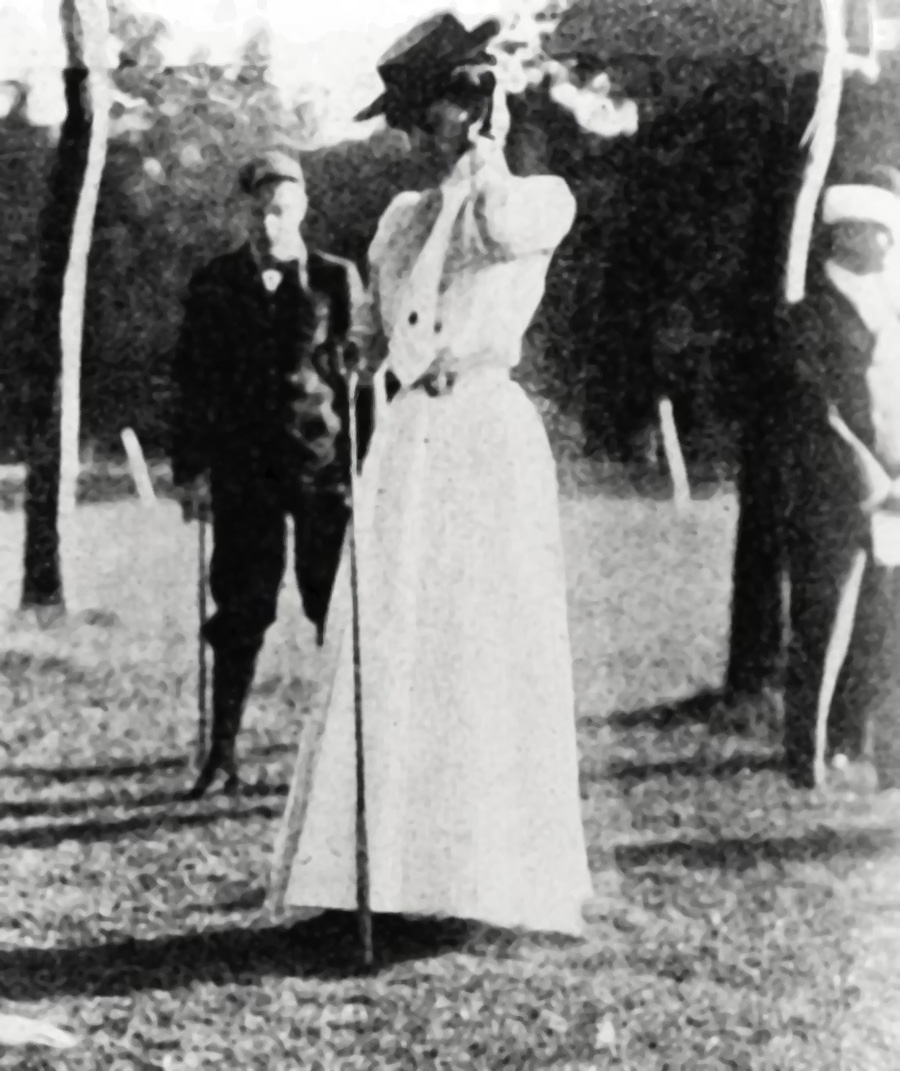
Margaret Abbott competing in golf. Abbott was the first American woman to win an Olympic event.

At the 1900 Paris Olympics, the U.S. team featured 75 athletes, a significant increase compared to 1896, but still considerably less than the French hosts, who fielded 720 competitors. The most notable of all American participants was Margaret Abbott, who became the first female American Olympic champion by winning the women's golf event. The vast majority of American medals were won in the sport of athletics, where U.S. athletes clinched 16 golds and 39 medals overall. Alvin Kraenzlein made significant contributions, winning four gold medals in track and field events. Ray Ewry won three gold medals in standing jumps (standing high jump, standing long jump, and standing triple jump) and Walter Tewksbury won two gold medals (400m hurdles and 200m hurdles) and a silver medal (60m). Team USA won only 8 medals outside of athletics, four of them in golf. Overall, France dominated the medal standings, winning 29 gold and 112 total medals. The United States ranked second with 19 and 48, respectively, showing great efficiency, despite having significantly fewer athletes.

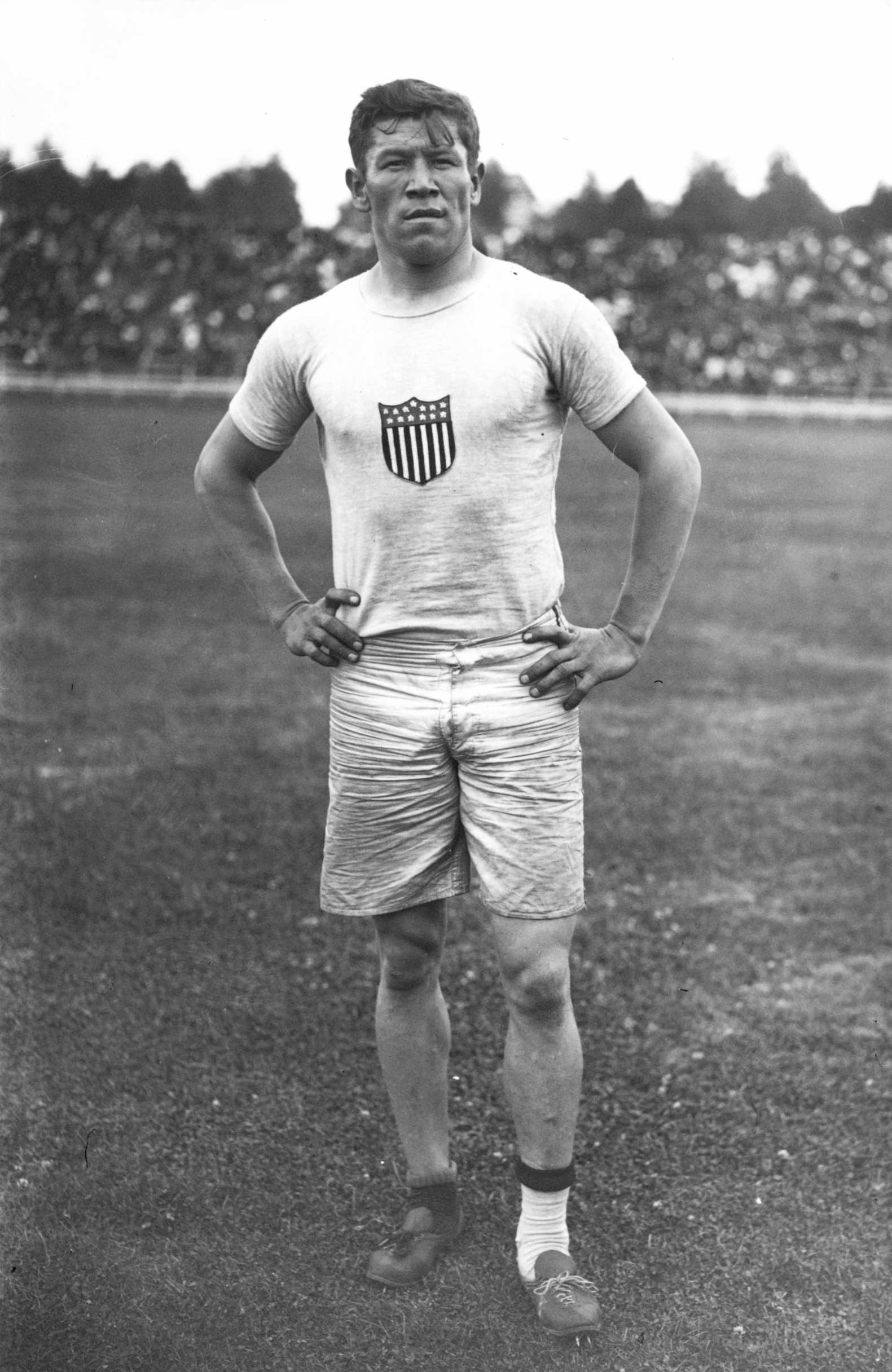
Jim Thorpe is remembered as a trailblazer, breaking barriers for Native American athletes

The 1904 Summer Olympics in St. Louis, Missouri coincided with the Louisiana Purchase Exposition, a world's fair, and marked the first time the Olympic Games were held outside Europe. Due to travel costs and logistical challenges, only 12 countries participated, and the United States accounted for 523 of the 630 athletes. This advantage helped the host win 239 medals (78 gold), the most medals earned by any country at one Olympic Games.

Notable performers included Archie Hahn, who won three gold medals in sprint events (60m, 100m, and 200m); James Lightbody, who won three gold medals in middle-distance events (800m, 1500m, and 2590m steeplechase); and Ray Ewry, who won three gold medals in standing jumps (high jump, long jump, and triple jump). Harry Hillman capturing multiple gold medals in various track and field events.

Continuing their track and field dominance, Team USA showcased formidable talent at the 1908 London Olympics. Notable athletes such as Ray Ewry (who won three gold medals in standing jumps), John Taylor (gold in 400m), and Mel Sheppard (gold in 800m and 1500m) contributed to the USA's success in athletics. Athletes such as Mel Sheppard emerged as stars, claiming multiple gold medals and solidifying America's status as a powerhouse in athletics. One of the most famous moments involving an American athlete at the 1908 Olympics was during the marathon race. Italian runner Dorando Pietri collapsed near the finish line due to exhaustion and was helped across the line by officials, but was subsequently disqualified, allowing American Johnny Hayes to win the gold medal. The United States won 47 medals in total, second to host Great Britain's 146.

American athletes continued to dominate in track and field event, and the 1912 Stockholm Olympics marked a significant milestone in American sports history as Jim Thorpe, a Native American athlete, achieved a unique feat by clinching gold medals in both the pentathlon and decathlon. He showcased exceptional athleticism in the process and became a celebrated figure in Olympic history. Controversy surrounding the supposed amateurism of athletes led to Thorpe's medals being rescinded due to his involvement in semi-professional baseball. They were returned in 1983, and 39 more years later he was restored as the sole winner of both events. Thorpe's legacy remains undiminished. Ralph Craig won the gold medal in both the 100 meters and 200 meters, solidifying American dominance in sprint events. American swimmers also performed well, contributing to the overall medal tally. Notable swimmers included Duke Kahanamoku, who won two gold medals in swimming events (100 meters freestyle and 4×200 meters freestyle relay). Sweden edged the United States in total medals, 65 to 64, but the U.S. claimed more golds—26 to Sweden's 23.

Overall, the U.S. placed first in gold medals during the early Olympic period, and second twice. These editions witnessed inconsistent event scheduling and programs, which usually favored hosting nations.

== Interwar period (1920–1936) ==
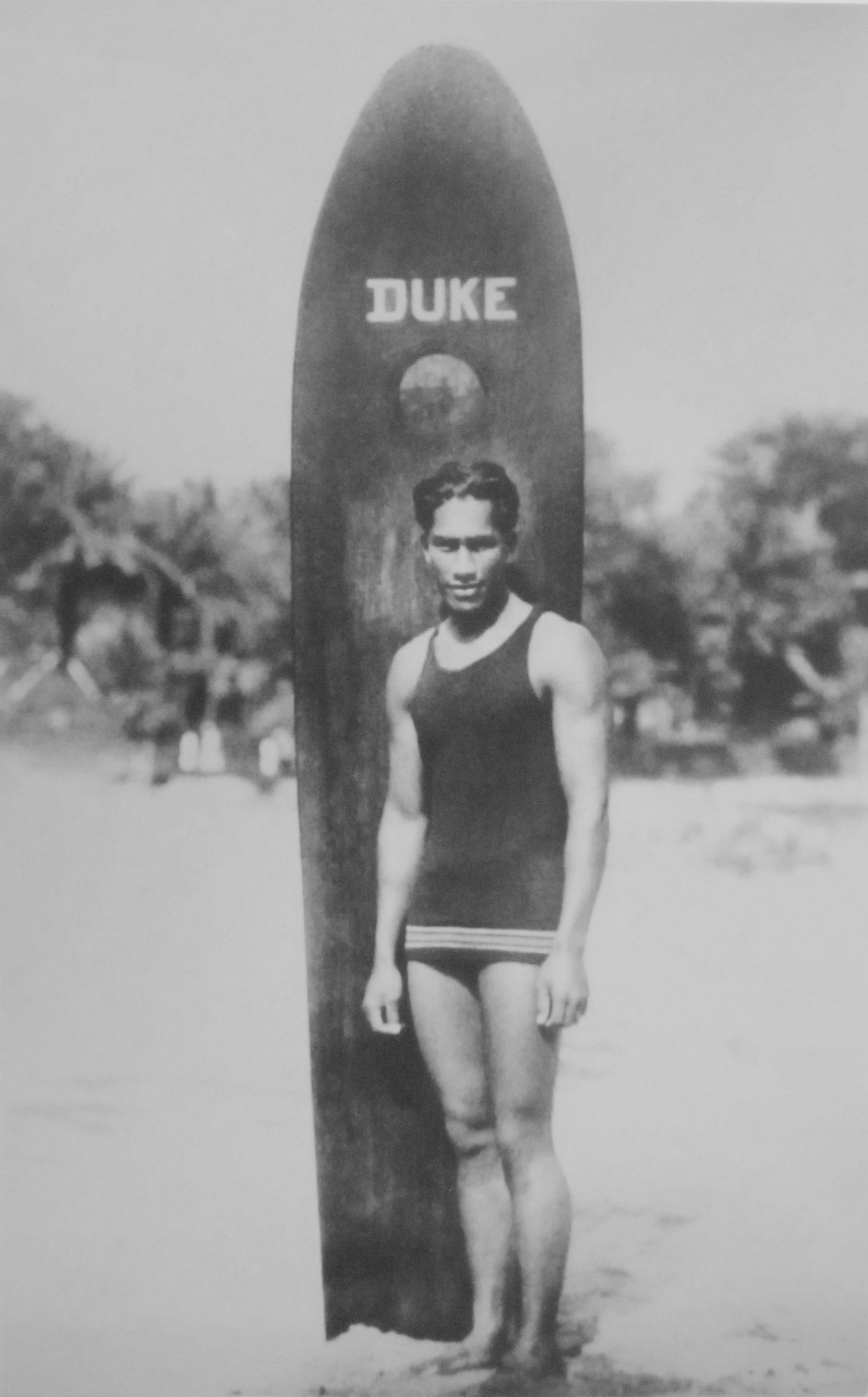
Duke Kahanamoku Hawaiian swimmer, won multiple gold medals at the 1920 Olympics and became renowned for his pioneering contributions to the sport of swimming.

Several notable American athletes participated in the 1920 Antwerp Olympics, including future legendary figures like swimmer Duke Kahanamoku. These games marked a historic moment for American swimming when Ethelda Bleibtrey became the first American woman to earn Olympic gold in the sport. 14 year-old Aileen Riggin became the first female Olympic diving champion, winning gold in the 3-meter springboard event.

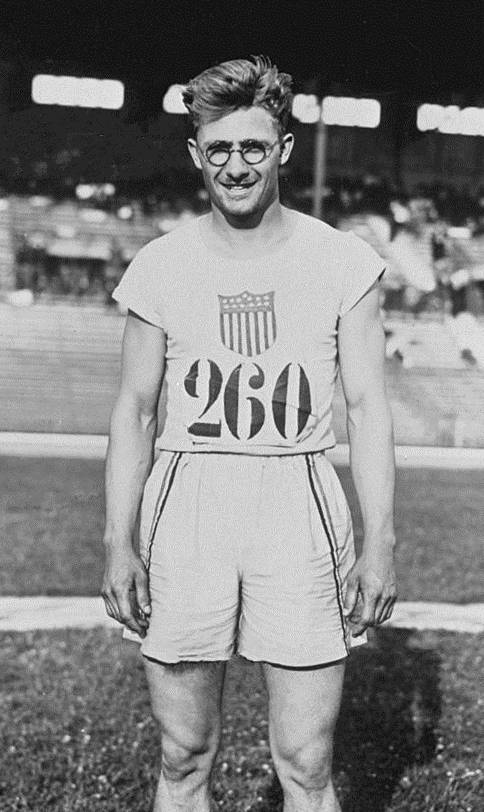
Harold Osborn won the gold medal in the decathlon at the 1924 Olympics in Paris, setting a world record in the process.

In 1924, at the Paris Olympics, Harold Osborn set a new world record while winning gold in the decathlon, and sprinter and long jumper Charley Paddock won two gold medals in the 100 meters and 4×100 meters relay. Johnny Weissmuller, who later gained fame as an actor playing Tarzan, secured three gold medals in swimming (100- and 400-meter freestyle, 4×200-meter freestyle relay) and a bronze medal in water polo. In the 1928 Amsterdam Olympics, he once again garnered gold in the 100-meter freestyle and 4×200-meter freestyle relay.

The 1932 Los Angeles Olympics distinguished itself as the first Games to host outdoor diving events, a milestone in Olympic history. Throughout these years, track and field remained a cornerstone of Team USA's success, highlighted by standout performances such as Babe Didrikson's achievements. American swimmers continued their tradition of excellence, with Helene Madison winning three gold medals in the women's freestyle events (100m, 400m, and 4 × 100 m relay). The U.S. also performed strongly in team sports and rowing (multiple medals). Lastly, the 1932 Olympics were significant as they were held during the Great Depression, and the success of American athletes provided a morale boost to the nation. The games also highlighted Los Angeles as a major international city capable of hosting large-scale sporting events. Moreover, the United States led both gold and overall medal counts at these four Games, establishing itself as a premier sporting power in the world.

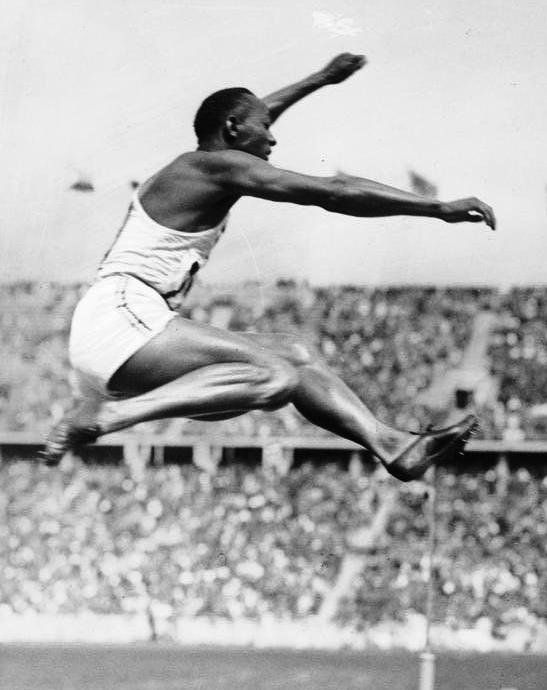
Jesse Owens at the 1936 Olympics

In 1936, Jesse Owens achieved enduring international renown at the Summer Olympics in Berlin, Germany. Owens's four gold medals in the 100 meters, long jump, 200 meters, and 4 × 100-meter relay not only established him as a legend but also challenged and debunked the Nazi theory of Aryan racial superiority on a global stage. However, for the first time since 1908, the U.S. ranked second in the medal standings, behind the hosts. The USA men's basketball team won the inaugural gold medal, establishing their dominance in the sport.

Overall, the United States delegations were highly successful during the interwar period, placing first at four consecutive Summer Olympics in 1920–1932 and second in 1936.

== Cold War era (1948–1992) ==
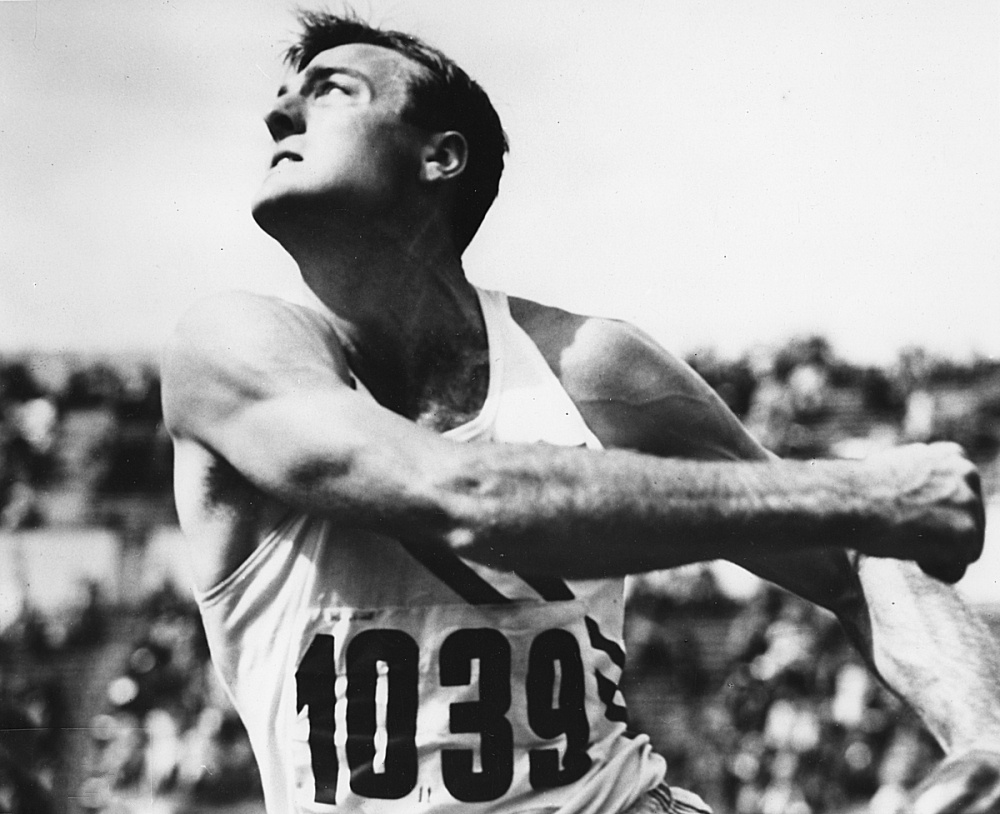
Bob Mathias became the star of the 1948 London games by winning the decathlon event at the age of 17. He would go on to repeat this feat at the 1952 Olympics in Helsinki, setting a new world record.

The 1948 London Olympics marked the first time that newly communist countries, occupied by the Soviet Union after WW2, competed in the games. The Soviets themselves declined to compete, sending only observers, after a long hesitation that saw Soviet leader Joseph Stalin demanding guarantees from his sports officials that the USSR would beat the US in the medal standings. The Soviet officials told him that chances were even, and Stalin ultimately rejected the idea of competing in 1948. With its newest political rival absent, the United States comfortably dominated the games, winning 38 gold and 84 total medals, 22 gold and 40 total medals more than the runner-up Sweden. The most medals were won in track and field, 27, and swimming, 15. The US basketball team won its second consecutive gold medal, defeating France in the final, 65–21. The 1948 London Summer Olympics marked the first time that the Olympic Games were broadcast on television with a more widespread coverage. However, television sets were still not widely available to the public at this time.

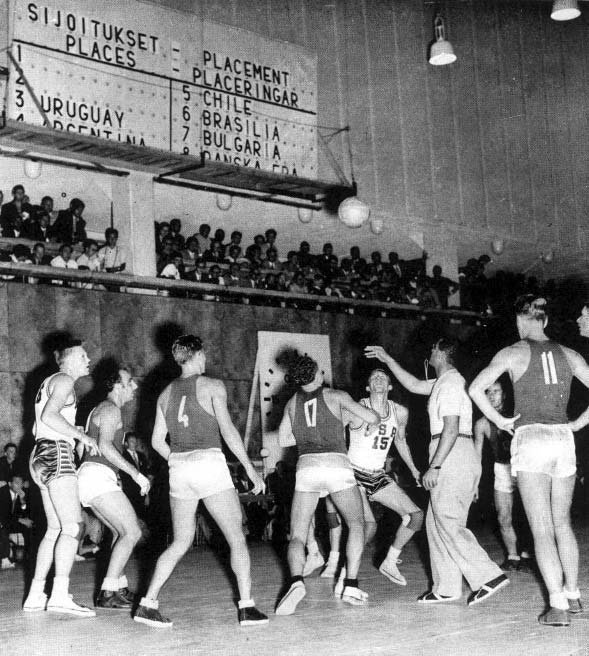
Gold medal game in basketball at the 1952 Olympics between the US and the USSR. The Americans won, 36–25.

In 1952, Helsinki saw the Soviets sending a team for the first time. This was a beginning of a new era, as the Soviet Union would go on to dominate the Olympics for the next four decades. The Soviet authorities provided state-funding to their athletes, who trained full-time. The United States still topped the medal count at these games, winning 40 gold and 76 total medals, 18 gold and five total medals more than the Soviets who finished second. American athletes won 31 medals in track and field, their most successful sport. The U.S. basketball team continued its winning streak, capturing the gold medal for the third consecutive time since basketball was introduced as an Olympic sport and twice defeating the Soviets in the process. American boxers won all five finals they entered, and American weightlifters edged their Soviet rivals four to three in terms of gold medals, with the two nations sweeping all seven events in the sport.

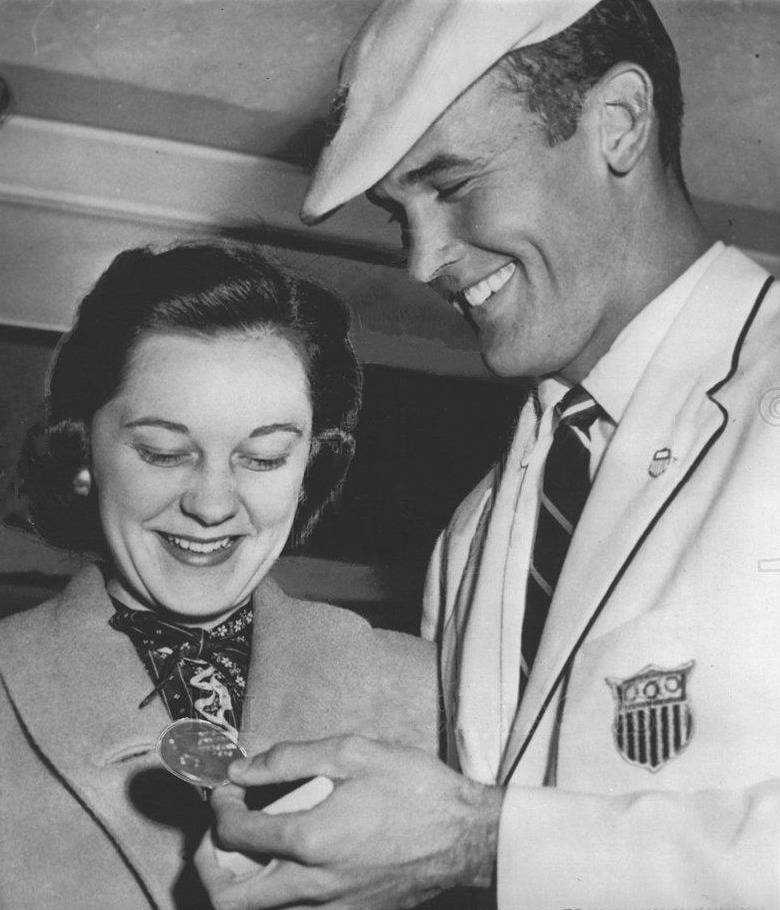
Bobby Morrow won gold in 100 meters, 200 meters, and 4×100 meters relay (track and field) at the 1956 Summer Olympics in Melbourne.

Melbourne hosted the Olympics in 1956. There were calls for the expulsion of the Soviet Union following their invasion of Hungary, but the International Olympic Committee decided not to pursue any action. As a result, some nations boycotted the games in protest of the Soviets' presence, and the Hungarians themselves became engaged in a violent brawl with their Soviet counterparts in a water polo game, an event that was instantly called "Blood in the Water". The U.S. performance at the games was relatively successful, as the Americans earned 32 gold and 78 total medals (second place in the medal standings), 5 gold and 24 total medals less than the first-place Soviets. The U.S. contingent was particularly successful in track and field, where American athletes amassed 31 medals. On the other hand, the U.S. won only 2 golds in swimming, being unable to stop the Australian domination of the swimming events at these games. In weightlifting, the Americans and Soviets once again won all seven events, with four and three golds, respectively. In boxing, the Soviets won 3 golds, while the Americans only won two events. However, it was gymnastics where the USSR achieved its greatest success, winning 11 out of 17 events and guaranteeing first place in the medal rankings. The U.S. basketball team won its fourth consecutive gold, beating the Soviets in the final game, 89–55. The 1956 Melbourne Summer Olympics were the first to be broadcast live via satellite. This allowed for real-time coverage of events across the globe, significantly expanding the audience reach.

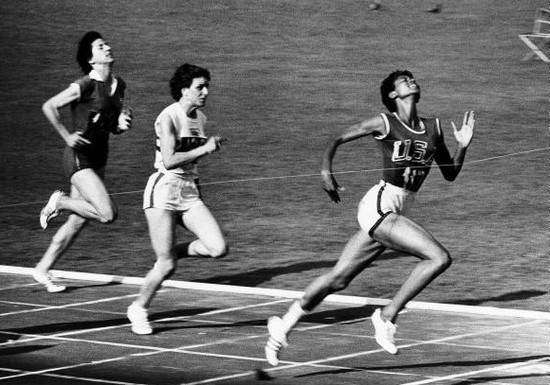
Wilma Rudolph became the first woman in history to sweep 100 meters, 200 meters, and 4×100 meters relay at the 1960 Rome Games.

The 1960 Rome Olympics saw the Americans losing their grip on their traditionally successful sports, such as track and field and weightlifting. On the other hand, boxing, swimming (where the Americans won 9 gold medals, while being controversially denied gold in the 100 meters freestyle), and wrestling produced unexpectedly good results. In track and field, the U.S. won 12 golds, as the U.S. team encountered problems, such as a controversial disqualification of their gold medal-winning men's 4×100 relay team. In weightlifting, the Soviets won five out of seven events, leaving the U.S. with one gold. The U.S. basketball team met the pre-tournament expectations and won its fifth consecutive gold medal. The final result of 34 gold and 71 total medals for the U.S., compared to the USSR's 43 gold and 103 total medals, showed that the U.S. was no longer the dominant force in Olympic competition. The 1960 Rome Summer Olympics were the first to be broadcast in the United States on CBS, with extensive coverage.

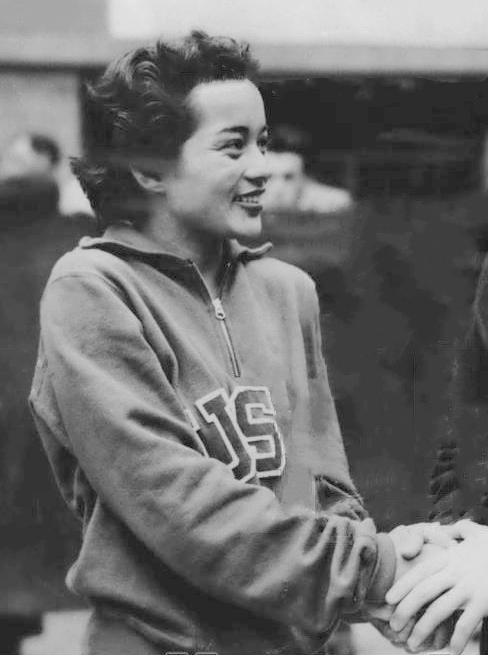
Victoria Manalo Draves was the first American woman to win two gold medals in diving, and the first Asian American to win Olympic gold medals.

There was some redemption for the U.S. at the 1964 Summer Olympics in Tokyo, as the nation returned to the top of the gold medal count for the first time since 1952. Particularly successful was the U.S. swimming team that won 13 out of an available 18 golds and shattered 9 world records. In track and field, the Americans also improved on their 1960 performance, winning 14 gold and 24 total medals. The Soviets, continued to dominate Olympic weightlifting, and, with the American program falling short, the USSR produced four golds and three silvers. However, for the Americans, despite a dismal performance in boxing, where they achieved only one gold, the 1964 Olympics were a definite success, with the nation winning 36 gold and 90 total medals, compared to the Soviet tally of 30 gold and 96 total medals. The U.S. topped the gold medal count, finishing second in the total medal count, while the USSR topped the total medal count and finished second in the gold medal count. The U.S. basketball team won its sixth consecutive gold, beating the USSR in the final, 73–59.

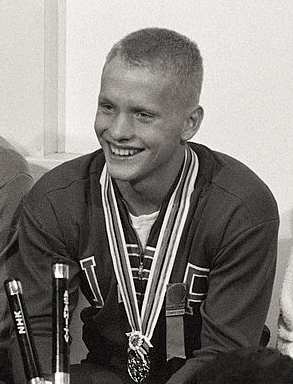
Don Schollander won 4 golds in swimming at the 1964 games in Tokyo, the largest individual medal haul in a single Olympics since Jesse Owens in 1936.

The 1968 Mexico Olympics became the most successful summer games for the U.S. in the post-war era. American athletes amassed 45 gold and 107 total medals. The U.S. swimming team dominated the competition, winning a staggering 51 medals and sweeping the podium on five occasions. The Americans also managed to medal in each of the 29 swimming events, thus achieving a unique feat. The U.S. track and field team won 15 gold and 28 total medals. Swimming and athletics accounted for more than 70% of all U.S. medals and ensured the top place in the medal table for the Americans for the second consecutive Games and their first finish at the top of the overall medal table since 1952. In other sports, however, the performance of American athletes was less convincing. The U.S. weightlifting team continued to fade, winning just one medal. American boxers won 7 medals, of which two were gold, while U.S. divers won 6 medals. The men's volleyball team stunned the defending champions from the Soviet Union, beating them in five sets, but still finished out of medals. The U.S. basketball team won its seventh consecutive gold medal, a feat not matched by any other Olympic team in ball sports. It was to be the last time that the U.S. finished first in the medal table in a fully attended Summer Olympics until 1996 (the Americans would top the medal standings in 1984 amid the Soviet boycott). The 1968 Grenoble Winter Olympics were the first to be broadcast in color, enhancing the viewing experience for audiences worldwide.

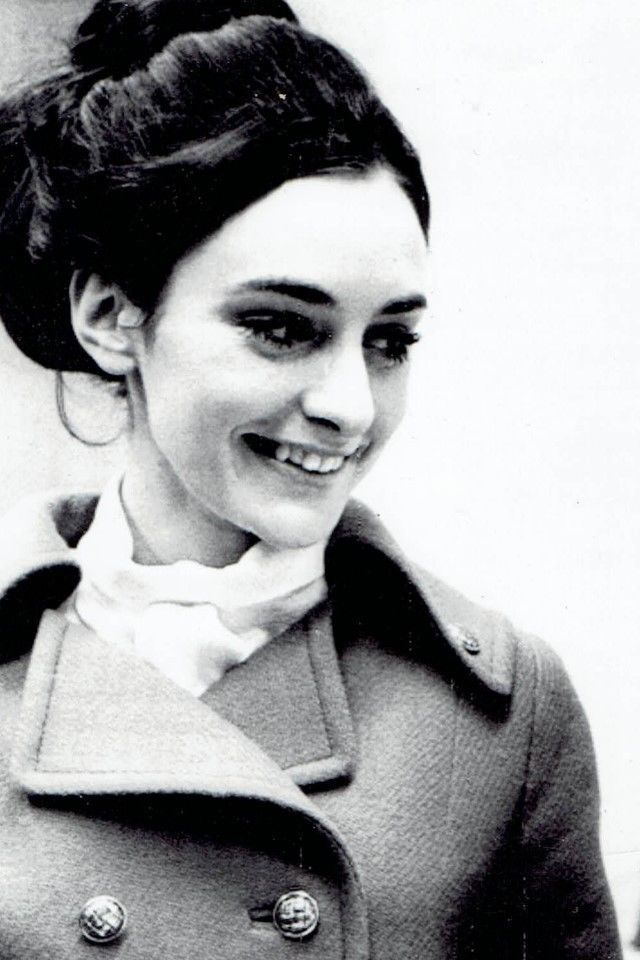
Peggy Fleming an American former figure skater and the only U.S. athlete in the 1968 Winter Olympics in Grenoble, France to bring home a gold medal

The Munich Olympics was largely overshadowed by the Munich massacre in the second week, in which eleven Israeli athletes and coaches and a West German police officer at Olympic village were killed by Black September terrorists. There were multiple calls to cancel the games after the terrorist attack, but the IOC declined. From a sporting standpoint, these Olympic Games were among the most controversial in history and one of the strangest Olympics ever for American athletes. U.S. world record holders in the 100 meters were given the wrong starting time and were unable to compete in the event. In swimming, the U.S. gold medal winner in the 400 meters freestyle was stripped of his medal for using his prescription asthma medication, also depriving him of a chance at multiple medals. U.S. boxers complained that they were judged unfairly in the bouts against their communist counterparts. In shooting, a U.S. athlete initially won the 50 meters rifle only to be relegated to silver after a "review". Finally, in the most controversial event of the Games, and one of the most controversial events of all time, the U.S. basketball team was denied gold after apparently winning the final match against the Soviet Union. The final three seconds of the game were replayed three times until the Soviets came out on top. The Americans did not accept the silver medals, believing that they were robbed. This was the first U.S. loss in Olympic basketball history, and it ended the Americans' 63-game winning streak in Olympic basketball. In general, the U.S. team greatly underperformed at these Games, winning only 6 gold medals in track and field to the East Germans' 8 and Soviets' 9, though the Americans still won the most total medals, 22. In boxing, the Cubans and Soviets dominated, winning three and two championships, respectively, while the U.S. won only one gold and four medals overall. In diving, the Americans won three medals; in wrestling, the U.S. team surprised with three golds in freestyle. In water polo, the Americans struck bronze, tying the eventual gold medalists, the Soviet Union, in the final round. Swimming was the only sport where the American team did not disappoint, winning 17 gold and 43 total medals. American women dominated swimming for the last time until 1992.

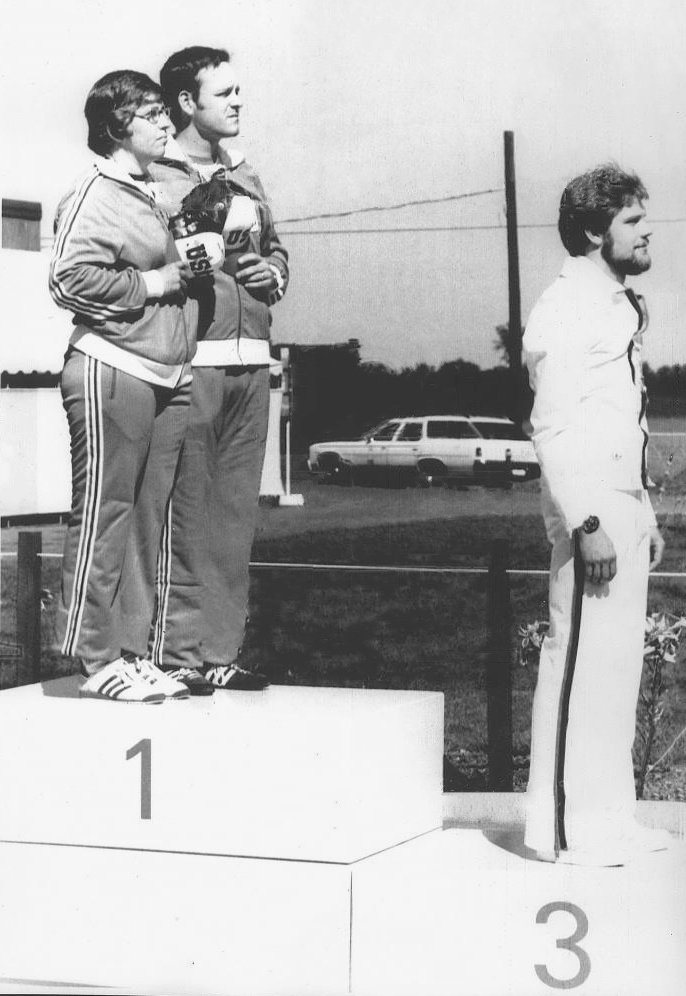
In 1976, Margaret Murdock captured the silver in the three positions shooting event. Lanny Bassham and Murdock tied for the first place, but Murdock was placed second after review of the targets. Bassham suggested that two gold medals be given, and after this request was declined, asked Murdock to share the top step with him at the award ceremony. Women had no separate shooting events at the time and were allowed to compete with men. Murdock became the first woman to win an Olympic medal in shooting.

The Eastern Bloc dominated the 1976 Montreal Olympics, with seven countries placing in the top ten of the medal table. The United States team was relegated to a third place in the medal standings for the first time in its history. This was an Olympics of contrasts: the U.S. men's swimming team, despite the generally dismal showing of the overall delegation, swept 12 gold and 27 total medals in the 13 events that were on the program and broke 11 world records in the process, while the US women's swimming team, on the other hand, fell victim to what was later shown to be a pervasive East German doping program. They still managed to win one gold medal, in an upset of the East Germans in the 4×100 freestyle relay. The event was held on the last day of the swimming program, and the American women were risking being deprived of gold for the first time in U.S. Olympic history. The victory was somewhat overlooked at the time, but since the early 1990s, when public revelation of the doping program began, the American gold medal is considered to be one of the sport's most improbable upsets. In track and field, both the U.S. men's and women's teams were overwhelmed by East Germans who secured a bulk of medals in the signature sports of the U.S., resulting in the USSR topping the medal table. The U.S. boxing team surprised everyone, advancing to six gold medal bouts and winning five of them, drawing parallels to a stellar 1952 team that also took five golds. The achievement was even more notable due to the fact that the American boxers were significantly younger and less experienced than their Cuban and Soviet counterparts. In other sports, U.S. divers won five medals, including two golds; the U.S. equestrian team took home four medals; American shooters won three medals, including a historic silver by a woman in the mixed 50 meters rifle three positions; U.S. freestyle wrestlers advanced to four gold medal bouts, yet won only one of them, concluding the meet with six medals overall. The U.S. men's basketball team reclaimed the gold medal, while the women's team won a surprising silver, being ranked no higher than sixth prior to the start of the tournament. The Soviets and East Germans were unstoppable in canoeing, gymnastics, rowing, weightlifting and wrestling, going 1–2 in the overall medal standings (49 gold and 125 total medals for the Soviets, and 40 gold and 90 total medals for East Germans). The U.S. won medals in 14 sports, finishing third with 34 gold and 94 total medals. The most successful day for the Americans was July 31 when they won 8 gold and 18 total medals.

The 1980 Summer Olympics marked another first for the United States, as the nation led by far the largest and most significant boycott in the Olympic history. The boycott was motivated by the 1979 Soviet invasion of Afghanistan. The United States and 65 other countries chose not to attend the Moscow Games, leaving them with the smallest attendance since 1956. Predictably, the great majority of the medals were taken by the host country and East Germany in what was the most skewed medal tally since 1904. The Soviets amassed 80 gold and 195 total (second-best result after the US in 1904) medals in their anticlimactic performance.

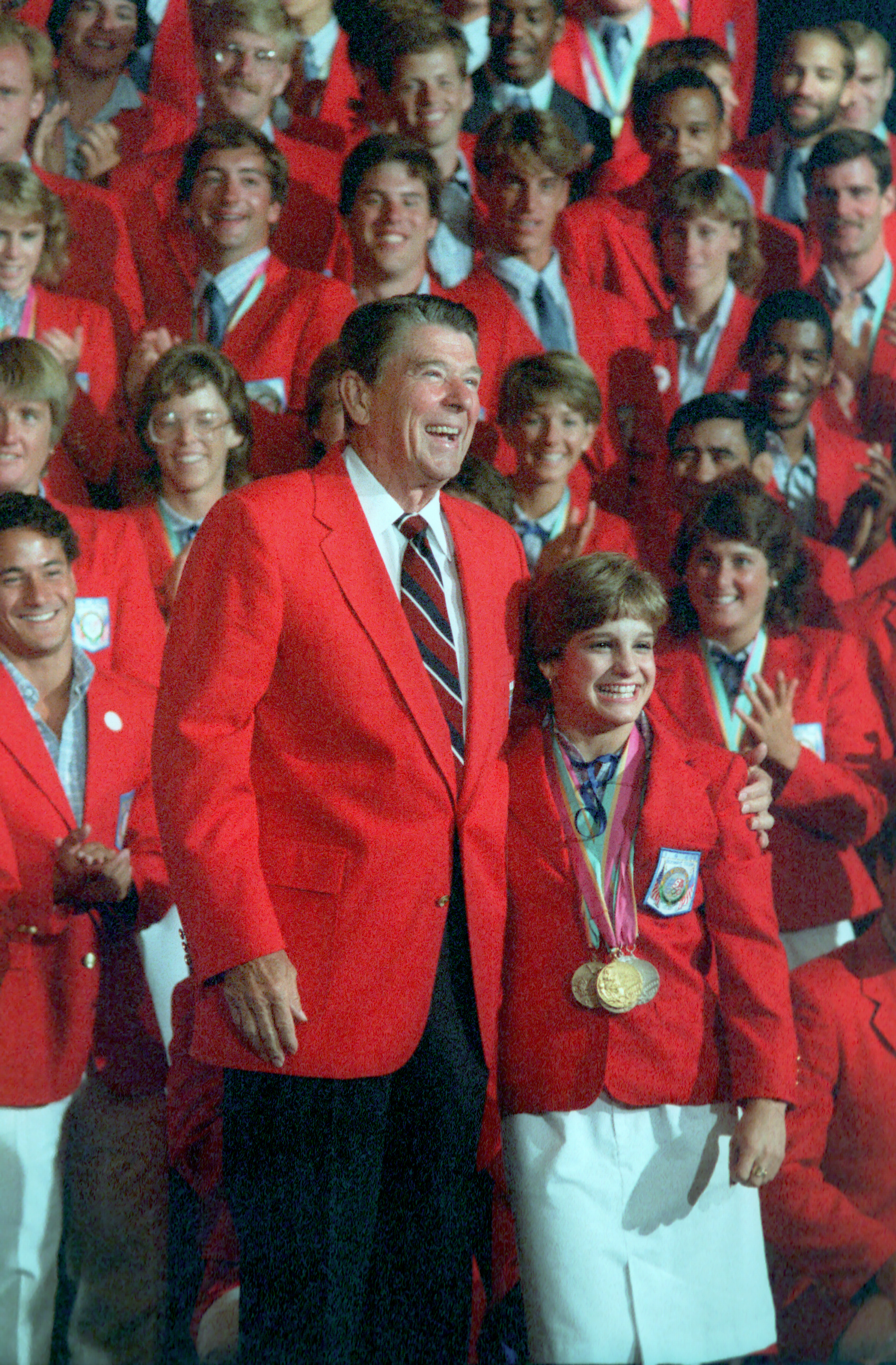
President Ronald Reagan and Mary Lou Retton with the U.S. Olympic Team in Los Angeles, 1984. Retton had just recovered in time from surgery to compete for the all-around title, where she completed two perfect 10s to defeat her Soviet-bloc competitor by .05 points for the gold medal.

In 1984, Los Angeles witnessed what was considered a retaliatory boycott by the Soviets and their satellites, although the Soviets cited security concerns and "chauvinistic sentiments and an anti-Soviet hysteria being whipped up in the United States." However, no threat to Eastern Bloc athletes was ever discovered, and the athletes from the Eastern Bloc country that did attend the 1984 games in Los Angeles—Romania—encountered no problems, and in fact were widely cheered above all other visiting nations at the Opening Ceremonies when they marched into the Los Angeles Memorial Coliseum (Romania ended up finishing second in the medal table at the Games). Furthermore, despite the Soviet boycott, a record 140 nations (including China, which participated for the first time since 1952) attended the Games. The 1984 Los Angeles Summer Olympics marked the first time that the Games were broadcast in multiple channels simultaneously, offering viewers a variety of events to watch. The United States topped the medal count, winning a record 83 gold medals and surpassing the Soviet Union's total of 80 golds at the 1980 Moscow Olympics.

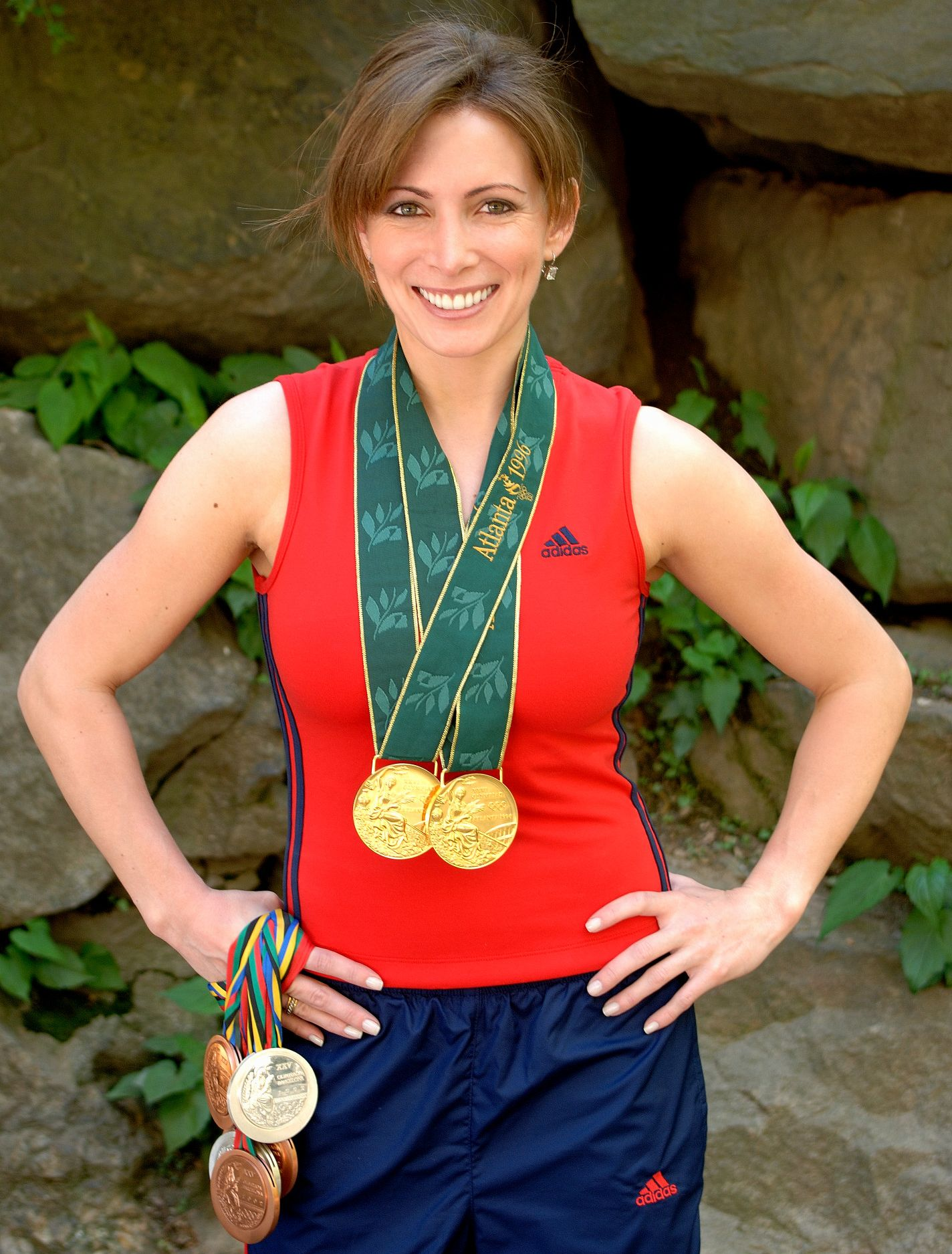
Among Olympic medalists, Shannon Miller is widely regarded as one of the greatest gymnasts in American history, with her achievements at the Olympics and beyond sports leaving an enduring legacy.

There were fears that the Soviet Union would boycott the 1988 Summer Olympics in Seoul as well, because South Korea had no diplomatic relations with the USSR, which recognized and supported only North Korea. However, the policies of Perestroika that were initiated by Gorbachev in 1985 led to the Soviet participation in the Games. Cuba decided to boycott the Olympics on its own, impacting the boxing field as a result. The Soviets and East Germany dominated what would be their last Olympics, winning 55 and 37 gold medals respectively (132 and 102 total medals). The United States placed third with 36 and 94. 1976 and 1988 are the only occasions where America failed to make the top two at the Summer Olympics (although in 1976 they placed second by total medals).

During the Cold War era, American athletes placed first in the medal count five times, second four times (including 1992), and third twice. Out of all periods, this was the United States' least dominant.
