= Dating Fever =

- Film poster
- Directed by: Han Jing
- Release date: 1 November 2013
- Running time: 106 minutes
- Country: China
- Language: Mandarin

Dating Fever (Chinese: 我為相親狂) is a 2013 Chinese romantic comedy film directed by Han Jing.

== Reception ==
On Film Business Asia, Derek Elley gave the film a grade of 6 out of 10, calling it a "frothy slice of throwaway rom-com fun" with "a lively young cast".
