= Serediuc =

Serediuc is a Romanian surname. Notable people with the surname include:

- Crina Violeta Serediuc (born 1971), Romanian rower
- Tiberiu Serediuc (born 1992), Romanian footballer
