= Pieta van Dishoeck =

Dutch rower (born 1972)

Personal information
- Born: 13 May 1972 (age 54)
Medal record
Women's rowing
Representing the Netherlands
Olympic Games
Silver medal – second place	2000 Sydney	Double sculls
Silver medal – second place	2000 Sydney	Eight

Pieta Roberta van Dishoeck (born 13 May 1972 in Hilversum, North Holland) is a retired rower from the Netherlands who won two Olympic medals during her career. She claimed the silver medal in the women's double sculls, alongside Eeke van Nes, and in the women's eight with coxswain in the 2000 Summer Olympics in Sydney, Australia.
