= Gleie =

Gleie is a surname. Notable people with the surname include:

- Katrin Gleie (born 1978), Danish rower
- Knud Gleie (1935–2010), Danish swimmer
