= Laryssa Biesenthal =

Canadian rower (born 1971)

Personal information
- Born: June 22, 1971 (age 55) Walkerton, Ontario, Canada
- Spouse: Iain Brambell
Medal record
Women's rowing
Representing Canada
Olympic Games
Bronze medal – third place	1996 Atlanta	Quadruple sculls
Bronze medal – third place	2000 Sydney	Eight
World Championships
Silver medal – second place	1995 Tampere	Quadruple sculls
Silver medal – second place	1997 Aiguebelette-le-lac	Eight
Bronze medal – third place	1998 Cologne	Eight
Bronze medal – third place	1999 St. Catharines	Eight
Pan American Games
Gold medal – first place	1999 Winnipeg	Double sculls

Laryssa Biesenthal (born June 22, 1971) is a Canadian former representative rower. She is a dual Olympic medallist and represented Canada in sweep-oared and sculling boats at four World Rowing Championships, medalling on each occasion. She is married to Olympic rower Iain Brambell.

== Rowing career ==
Biesenthal first started rowing as a student at the University of British Columbia in 1990.

She made her national representative debut for Canada at the 1995 World Rowing Championships in Tampere, Finland, where she won a silver medal in the quadruple sculls event with Kathleen Heddle, Marnie McBean and Diane O’Grady. This same quad won bronze at the 1996 Atlanta Olympics. Biensenthal went on to win a silver medal at the 1997 World Rowing Championships, silver and bronze medals at the 1998 World Rowing Championships, and another bronze at the 1999 World Championships.

Biensenthal won two more medals before retiring, gold at the 1999 Pan American Games, and a final bronze at the 2000 Sydney Olympic Games.

== Coaching career ==
After her retirement from competitive rowing, she worked as a coach for the Canadian national team prior to the 2004 Summer Games. She has been Head Coach at the Brentwood College School on Vancouver Island and in 2022 took a senior coaching role at the Sydney University Boat Club.

Biesenthal has worked as a World Rowing Development Coach in Asia and Oceania was inducted into the University of British Columbia Hall of Fame in 2014.
