= Kerstin Köppen =

German rower

Personal information
- Born: 24 November 1967 (age 58) Rathenow, Bezirk Potsdam, East Germany

Sport
- Sport: Rowing
Medal record
Representing East Germany
World Rowing Championships
| Gold medal – first place | 1990 Tasmania | Quadruple sculls |
Summer Universiade
| Bronze medal – third place | 1989 Duisburg | Quadruple sculls |
Representing Germany
Olympic Games
| Gold medal – first place | 1992 Barcelona | Double sculls |
| Gold medal – first place | 1996 Atlanta | Quadruple sculls |
World Rowing Championships
| Gold medal – first place | 1991 Vienna | Quadruple Sculls |
| Gold medal – first place | 1994 Indianapolis | Quadruple Sculls |
| Gold medal – first place | 1995 Tampere | Quadruple Sculls |
| Gold medal – first place | 1997 Aiguebelette | Quadruple Sculls |
| Silver medal – second place | 1993 Racice | Double Sculls |

Kerstin Köppen (later Köppen-Kosbab now Holtmeyer, born 24 November 1967) is a German former rower and Olympic champion. She is a two-time Olympic gold medallist, winning in 1992 and 1996. In addition, she has also won 5 Gold Medals in the Quadruple Sculls event at the World Championships beginning with Lake Barrington, Tasmania in 1990 whilst representing the former East Germany and a further four times for the re-unified Germany. She is married to Ralf Holtmeyer who coaches the German eight.
