= Dolores Amaya =

Argentine rower

Personal information
- Nationality: Argentine
- Born: 16 April 1980 (age 45)

Sport
- Sport: Rowing

Dolores Amaya (born 16 April 1980) is an Argentine rower. She competed in the women's double sculls event at the 1996 Summer Olympics. Aged 16, she was Argentina's youngest rowing competitor at the 1996 Olympics.
