= Inna Frolova =

Ukrainian rower

Personal information
- Born: Inna Vasylivna Frolova; 3 June 1965 (age 61) Dnipropetrovsk, Ukrainian SSR, Soviet Union
- Height: 182 cm (6 ft 0 in)
- Weight: 82 kg (181 lb)

Sport
- Sport: Rowing
- Club: Spartak Dnipropetrovsk
Medal record
Women's rowing
Olympic Games
Representing the Soviet Union
Silver medal – second place	1988 Seoul	Quadruple sculls
World Rowing Championships
Silver medal – second place	1990 Copenhagen	Double sculls
Representing Ukraine
Silver medal – second place	1996 Atlanta	Quadruple sculls
World Rowing Championships
Bronze medal – third place	1997 Aiguebelette-le-Lac	Quadruple sculls

Inna Vasylivna Frolova (Ukrainian: Инна Фролова; born 3 June 1965 in Dnipropetrovsk) is a retired rower from Ukraine, who twice won an Olympic medal during her career. She is a three-time Olympian.

After having won the silver medal for the Soviet Union in the Women's Quadruple Sculls at the 1988 Summer Olympics Frolova repeated that feat, rowing for Ukraine at the 1996 Summer Olympics. In Atlanta, Georgia her team mates were Olena Ronzhyna, Svitlana Maziy, and Dina Miftakhutdynova.
