= Patsouris =

Greek sport shooter

Patsouris (Greek: Πατσούρης) was a Greek shooter. He competed at the 1896 Summer Olympics in Athens. Patsouris competed in the military pistol event. His place and score in the competition are unknown except that he did not finish in the top five.
