= Shooting at the 1896 Summer Olympics – Men's 25 metre military pistol =

Olympic shooting event

Men's 25 metre military pistol at the Games of the I Olympiad
- Shooting pictogram
- Venue: Kallithea shooting range
- Date: April 10, 1896
- Competitors: 16 from 4 nations
- Winning score: 442

Medalists
1st place, gold medalist(s)		John Paine; United States
2nd place, silver medalist(s)		Sumner Paine; United States
3rd place, bronze medalist(s)		Nikolaos Morakis; Greece

The men's 25 metre military pistol was one of the five sport shooting events on the 1896 Summer Olympics shooting programme. 16 competitors from four nations entered the military pistol match, held on 10 April. Each shot thirty rounds in five strings of six at a target 25 metres away. The winner, John Paine of the United States, hit the target 25 times. His brother, Sumner Paine, hit the target 23 times. They used American-made military Colt revolvers.

== Background ==
This was the only appearance of the men's 25 metre military pistol event.

== Competition format ==
The competition had each shooter fire 30 shots, in 5 strings of 6, at a range of 25 metres. Scoring involved multiplying target hits by points scored in each string. Each target had a score of up to 6. The maximum score possible in each string of shots was 216 (6 hits times 6 scores of 6); for the 5-string total, the maximum was 1080 points.

== Schedule ==
The military pistol event was held at the start of the fifth day of competition.

Date		Time	Round
Gregorian	Julian	Time	Round
Friday, 10 April 1896	Friday, 29 March 1896	10:00	Final

== Results ==
Rank	Shooter	Nation	Score	Hits
1st place, gold medalist(s)	John Paine	United States	442	25
2nd place, silver medalist(s)	Sumner Paine	United States	380	23
3rd place, bronze medalist(s)	Nikolaos Morakis	Greece	205	Unknown
4	Ioannis Phrangoudis	Greece	Unknown	
5	Holger Nielsen	Denmark	Unknown	
6–13	Zenon Mikhailidis	Greece	Unknown	
6–13	Georgios Orphanidis	Greece	Unknown	
6–13	Pantazidis	Greece	Unknown	
6–13	Patsouris	Greece	Unknown	
6–13	Panagiotis Pavlidis	Greece	Unknown	
6–13	Aristovoulos Petmezas	Greece	Unknown	
6–13	Platis	Greece	Unknown	
6–13	Vavis	Greece	Unknown	
—	Pantelis Karasevdas	Greece	Did not finish	
—	Sidney Merlin	Great Britain	Did not finish	
—	Sanidis	Greece	Did not finish	
