= Kerry Knowler =

Australian rower

Personal information
- Born: 26 August 1967 (age 57); Sydney, Australia
- Height: 1.78 m (5 ft 10 in)
- Weight: 70 kg (150 lb)

Sport
- Country: Australia
- Sport: Rowing
- Club: UTS Haberfield Rowing Club, Sydney

Kerry Knowler (born 26 August 1967 in Sydney) is an Australian rower. She competed in the women's quadruple sculls event at the 2000 Summer Olympics in Sydney.
