= Margarita Bogdanova =

Russian rower

Personal information
- Nationality: Russian
- Born: 1 January 1972 (age 53)

Sport
- Sport: Rowing

Margarita Bogdanova (Russian: Маргарита Богданова; born 1 January 1972) is a Russian rower. She competed in the women's quadruple sculls event at the 1996 Summer Olympics.
