= Jennifer Dore =

American rower (born 1971)

Personal information
- Born: December 19, 1971 (age 54) Montclair, New Jersey, U.S.
Medal record
Women's rowing
Representing United States
World Rowing Championships
Gold medal – first place	1995 Tampere	W8+
Silver medal – second place	1993 Račice	W8+
Silver medal – second place	1994 Indianapolis	W8+
Silver medal – second place	1998 Cologne	W8+
Summer Universiade
Silver medal – second place	1993 Buffalo	W8+

Jennifer Dore-Terhaar (born December 19, 1971) is an American rower, two-time Olympian and World Champion. She competed in women's quadruple sculls at the 2000 Summer Olympics.

Raised in Kearny, Dore graduated from Kearny High School and attended Rutgers University, where she competed as a rower. She graduated from Rutgers in 1993 and was inducted into the school's hall of fame in 2000.

She is currently a teacher as well as a crew coach at The Peddie School.
