= Kristina Poplavskaja =

Lithuanian rower (born 1972)

Olympic medal record

Women's Rowing
Bronze medal – third place	2000 Sydney	Double sculls

Kristina Poplavskaja (born 24 July 1972) is a Lithuanian rower who won an Olympic bronze medal in the Double Sculls event at the 2000 Summer Olympics in Sydney.
