= Manja Kowalski =

German rower (born 1976)

Medal record

Women's rowing

Representing Germany

Olympic Games
Gold medal – first place	2000 Sydney	Quad sculls

World Rowing Championships
Gold medal – first place	2001 Lucerne	Quad sculls

Manja Kowalski (born 25 January 1976 in Potsdam) is a German rower. She is the twin sister of Kerstin Kowalski.
