= Laila Finska-Bezerra =

Finnish rower

Personal information
- Nationality: Finnish
- Born: 8 August 1968 (age 56); Maaninka, Finland

Sport
- Sport: Rowing

Laila Finska-Bezerra (née Finska; born 8 August 1968) is a Finnish former rower. She competed in the women's single sculls event at the 1996 Summer Olympics.

== Personal life ==
Finska-Bezerra is married to Portuguese former rower Luis Bezerra. They live in Porto, Portugal.
