= Nikolaos Morakis =

Greek sports shooter

Medal record

Men's shooting

Representing Greece

Olympic Games
Bronze medal – third place	1896 Athens	Military pistol

Nikolaos "Nikos" Morakis (Greek: Νικόλαος "Νίκος" Μωράκης), sometimes seen as Dorakis (Greek: Δοράκης), was a Greek shooter. He competed at the 1896 Summer Olympics in Athens. Morakis came third in the military pistol event with 205 points behind the American brothers John and Sumner Paine, and fourth in the free pistol event.
