= Park Yeong-ja =

South Korean rower

Personal information
- Nationality: South Korean
- Born: 7 March 1975 (age 50)

Sport
- Sport: Rowing

Park Yeong-ja (Korean: 박영자; born 7 March 1975) is a South Korean rower. She competed in the women's double sculls event at the 1996 Summer Olympics.
