= Kerstin Kowalski =

German rower (born 1976)

Medal record

Women's rowing

Representing Germany

Olympic Games
Gold medal – first place	2000 Sydney	Quad sculls
Gold medal – first place	2004 Athens	Quad sculls

World Rowing Championships
Gold medal – first place	1999 St. Catharines	Quad sculls
Gold medal – first place	2001 Lucerne	Double sculls
Gold medal – first place	2002 Seville	Quad sculls
Bronze medal – third place	2003 Milan	Quad sculls

Kerstin Kowalski (also known as Kerstin El Qalqili; born 25 January 1976 in Potsdam-Babelsberg) is a German rower. At the 2000 Olympics she rowed with her twin sister Manja. Kowalski was married to fellow rower Iradj El Qalqili, who had proposed to her at the finish line at the 2000 Olympics.
