= Cathy Symon =

American rower

Personal information
- Full name: Catherine P. Symon
- Born: December 16, 1971 (age 54) Villanova, Pennsylvania, United States

Sport
- Sport: Rowing
Medal record
Representing United States
Pan American Games
| Silver medal – second place | 1995 Mar del Plata | Quadruple sculls |

Catherine P. Symon (born December 16, 1971) is an American rower. She competed in the women's quadruple sculls event at the 1996 Summer Olympics.
