= Marianna Barelli =

Italian rower

Personal information
- Nationality: Italian
- Born: 15 July 1976 (age 48); Como, Italy

Sport
- Sport: Rowing

Marianna Barelli (born 15 July 1976) is an Italian rower. She competed in the women's double sculls event at the 1996 Summer Olympics.
