= Meike van Driel =

Dutch rower

Personal information
- Nationality: Dutch
- Born: 12 July 1972 (age 52); Voorburg, Netherlands

Sport
- Sport: Rowing

Meike van Driel (born 12 July 1972) is a Dutch rower. She competed in the women's quadruple sculls event at the 1996 Summer Olympics.
