= Kristine Klaveness =

Norwegian rower

Personal information
- Nationality: Norwegian
- Born: 11 February 1976 (age 49) Oslo, Norway

Sport
- Sport: Rowing

Kristine Klaveness (born 11 February 1976) is a Norwegian rower. She competed in the women's double sculls event at the 1996 Summer Olympics.
