= Vavis =

Greek sport shooter

Vavis (Greek: Βάβης) was a Greek shooter. He competed at the 1896 Summer Olympics in Athens. Vavis competed in the military pistol event. His place and score in the competition are unknown except that he did not finish in the top five.
