= Kristine Bjerknes =

Norwegian rower

Personal information
- Nationality: Norwegian
- Born: 22 February 1976 (age 49); Drammen, Norway

Sport
- Sport: Rowing

Kristine Bjerknes (born 22 February 1976) is a Norwegian rower. She competed in the women's double sculls event at the 1996 Summer Olympics.
