= Dré Thies =

American rower

Personal information
- Full name: Andréa B. Thies
- Born: September 21, 1967 (age 58) Irvington, New York, United States

Sport
- Sport: Rowing
Medal record
Representing United States
Pan American Games
Silver medal – second place	1995 Mar del Plata	Double sculls

Andréa B. Thies (born September 21, 1967), known as Dré Thies, is an American rower. She competed in the women's quadruple sculls event at the 1996 Summer Olympics.
