= Julia Chilicki =

American rower

Personal information
- Full name: Julia L. Chilicki
- Born: August 1, 1971 (age 54) Somers, Connecticut, United States

Sport
- Sport: Rowing
Medal record
Representing United States
Pan American Games
Bronze medal – third place	1995 Mar del Plata	Quadruple sculls

Julia Chilicki (later Beasley; born August 1, 1971) is an American rower. She competed in the women's quadruple sculls event at the 1996 Summer Olympics.
