= Liene Lutere =

Latvian rower (born 1976)

Personal information
- Born: 3 February 1976 (age 49) Cēsis, Latvia

Sport
- Country: Latvia
- Sport: Rowing

Liene Lutere (born 3 February 1976) is a Latvian rower. She competed in the women's double sculls event at the 1996 Summer Olympics.
