= Sanita Ozoliņa =

Latvian rower (born 1975)

Personal information
- Nationality: Latvian
- Born: 18 October 1975 (age 50) Riga, Latvia

Sport
- Sport: Rowing

Sanita Ozoliņa (born 18 October 1975) is a Latvian rower. She competed in the women's double sculls event at the 1996 Summer Olympics.
