= Elena Popa =

Romanian rower

Personal information
- Nationality: Romanian
- Born: 1 October 1976 (age 48); Batăr, Romania

Sport
- Sport: Rowing

Elena Popa (born 1 October 1976) is a Romanian rower. She competed in the women's quadruple sculls event at the 2000 Summer Olympics.
