= Pantazidis =

Greek sport shooter

Pantazidis (Greek: Πανταζίδης) was a Greek shooter. He competed at the 1896 Summer Olympics in Athens, Greece. Pantazidis competed in the military pistol event. His place and score in the competition are unknown except that he did not finish in the top five.
