= Bianca Carstensen =

Danish rower

Personal information
- Nationality: Danish
- Born: 1 September 1975 (age 49)

Sport
- Sport: Rowing

Bianca Carstensen (born 1 September 1975) is a Danish rower. She competed in the women's quadruple sculls event at the 2000 Summer Olympics.
