= Bernadette Wicki =

Swiss rower

Personal information
- Nationality: Swiss
- Born: 30 June 1968 (age 57) Hergiswil, Switzerland

Sport
- Sport: Rowing

Bernadette Wicki (born 30 June 1968) is a Swiss rower. She competed in the women's double sculls event at the 2000 Summer Olympics.
