= Carol Skricki =

American rower

Medal record

Women's rowing

Representing the United States

World Rowing Championships
Bronze medal – third place	2001 Lucerne	W4x

Carol Skricki (born July 27, 1962, in Norwood, Massachusetts) is an American rower. Along with Ruth Davidon she finished 4th in the women's double sculls at the 2000 Summer Olympics.
