= Sanidis =

Greek sport shooter

Sanidis (Greek: Σανίδης) was a Greek shooter. He competed at the 1896 Summer Olympics in Athens. Sanidis competed in the military pistol event. He did not finish the competition.
