= Liu Xiaochun =

Chinese rower

Personal information
- Nationality: Chinese
- Born: 21 April 1974 (age 51)

Sport
- Sport: Rowing

Liu Xiaochun (Chinese: 劉曉春; born 21 April 1974) is a Chinese rower. She competed in the women's single sculls event at the 1996 Summer Olympics.
