= Monique Heinke =

Australian rower

Personal information
- Born: 25 May 1973 (age 51); Sydney, Australia
- Height: 1.90 m (6 ft 3 in)
- Weight: 75 kg (165 lb)

Sport
- Country: Australia
- Sport: Rowing

Monique Heinke (born 25 May 1973 in Sydney) is an Australian rower. She competed in the women's quadruple sculls event at the 2000 Summer Olympics and the women's eight event at the 2004 Summer Olympics in Athens.
