= Erika Bello =

Italian rower

Personal information
- Nationality: Italian
- Born: 30 November 1975 (age 49); Rome, Italy

Sport
- Sport: Rowing

Erika Bello (born 30 November 1975) is an Italian former rower. She competed in the women's double sculls event at the 1996 Summer Olympics.
