= Trine Hansen =

Danish rower

Personal information
- Full name: Hanne Trine Hansen
- Nationality: Danish
- Born: 19 February 1973 (age 53) Ringsted, Denmark
- Height: 179 cm (5 ft 10 in)
Medal record
Women's rowing
Representing Denmark
Olympic Games
Bronze medal – third place	1996 Atlanta	Single sculls
World Rowing Championship
Gold medal – first place	1994 Indianapolis	Single Sculls
Silver medal – second place	1997 Aiguebelette	Single Sculls
Bronze medal – third place	1993 Račice	Single Sculls

Trine Hansen (born 19 February 1973 in Ringsted, Sjælland) is a retired female rower from Denmark. Hansen mainly competed in the single scull boat type, and she won the World Rowing Championship in 1994 and a Bronze medal at the 1996 Summer Olympics in single sculls.

Trine Hansen grew up in Sorø and was affiliated with Sorø Roklub until 1997 where she moved to Roforeningen Kvik. She won the Danish Rowing Championship in single sculls in eight consecutive years (1992–1999), in addition to several other Danish titles (W2x in 1998 and 1999; W8+ in 2002). She competed at the Summer Olympic Games in Barcelona 1992 and in Atlanta 1996.

She won her first international medal (Bronce) at the 1991 World Rowing Junior Championships on Lake of Banyoles that became the venue for rowing at the Olympic Games the following year.

In 1993 she beat England's Alison Hall by 4 lengths to become the first female winner of the Henley Royal Regatta. 1993 was the first year that women were allowed to row competitively over the full course. The same year she won the Bronze medal at the World Rowing Championship in Račice, Czech Republic.

In 1994 she won the World Rowing Championship in the Women's Single Sculls competition that took place in Indianapolis, Indiana.

In 1996 Hansen claimed the bronze medal in the Women's Single Sculls Competition at the 1996 Summer Olympics in Atlanta, Georgia.

In 1997 Hansen won Silver at the World Rowing Championship at Lac d'Aiguebelette in France.
