= Cécile Tucker =

American rower

Personal information
- Full name: Cécile Ulbrich Tucker
- Born: May 19, 1969 (age 55); Warren, Maine, United States

Sport
- Sport: Rowing

Cécile Ulbrich Tucker (born May 19, 1969) is an American rower. She competed in the women's quadruple sculls event at the 1996 Summer Olympics. She rowed at Harvard College.

Her great-grandfather, John Paine, competed in the 1896 Summer Olympics, one hundred years before her.
