= Olena Reutova =

Ukrainian rower

Personal information
- Nationality: Ukrainian
- Born: 18 August 1968 (age 56)

Sport
- Sport: Rowing

Olena Reutova (Ukrainian: Олена Реутова; born 18 August 1968) is a Ukrainian rower. She competed in the women's double sculls event at the 1996 Summer Olympics.
