= Diane O'Grady =

Canadian rower

Personal information
- Born: November 23, 1967 (age 58) North Bay, Ontario, Canada

Sport
- Sport: Rowing
Medal record
Women's rowing
Representing Canada
Olympic Games
Bronze medal – third place	1996 Atlanta	Quadruple sculls
World Rowing Championships
Silver medal – second place	1995 Tampere	Quadruple sculls
Pan American Games
Gold medal – first place	1995 Mar del Plata	Double sculls
Gold medal – first place	1995 Mar del Plata	Quadruple sculls
Summer Universiade
Gold medal – first place	1993 Buffalo	Coxless fours

Diane Carolyn O'Grady (born November 23, 1967) is a Canadian rower. She competed at the 1996 Summer Olympics.
