= Han Jing =

Chinese rower

Personal information
- Nationality: Chinese
- Born: 7 August 1978 (age 46)

Sport
- Sport: Rowing

Han Jing (born 7 August 1978) is a Chinese rower. She competed in the women's quadruple sculls event at the 2000 Summer Olympics.
