= William C. Davidon =

American physicist and activist (1927–2013)

- Born: March 18, 1927; Fort Lauderdale, Florida, U.S.
- Died: November 8, 2013 (aged 86); Highlands Ranch, Colorado
- Known for: Quasi-Newton methods Citizens' Commission to Investigate the FBI

Academic background
- Education: University of Chicago
- Thesis: A Proper Time Formalism (1954)
- Doctoral advisor: Murray Gell-Mann

Academic work
- Institutions: Argonne National Laboratory; Haverford College

William Cooper Davidon (March 18, 1927 – November 8, 2013) was an American professor of physics and mathematics, and a peace activist. As the mastermind of the March 8, 1971, FBI office break-in, in Media, Pennsylvania, Davidon was the informal leader of the Citizens' Commission to Investigate the FBI. The Media break-in resulted in the disclosure of COINTELPRO, which in turn led to subsequent investigations and reforms of the FBI.

== Life ==
Davidon was born in Fort Lauderdale, Florida, in 1927. He attended Purdue University and graduated from the University of Chicago with a B.S. (1947), masters (1950), and Ph.D. (1954) in physics. From 1954 to 1956, Davidon was a research associate at the Enrico Fermi Institute. From 1956 to 1961, he was an associate physicist at the Argonne National Laboratory, where he developed the first quasi-Newton algorithm, now known as the Davidon–Fletcher–Powell formula.

Davidon was professor of physics at Haverford College from 1961 to 1981, and then Professor of Mathematics (1981–1991), as his interests shifted to include mathematical logic, set theory and non-standard analysis. Davidon was a 1966 Fulbright Scholar. He retired in 1991.

Davidon moved to Highlands Ranch, Colorado, in 2010. He died November 8, 2013, of Parkinson's disease.

== Activism ==
In 1966, Davidon traveled to South Vietnam, with A. J. Muste, sponsored by the Committee for Non-Violent Action. He also announced that year that he would be refusing to pay his federal income tax in protest against the Vietnam War. Later, he became a sponsor of the War Tax Resistance project, which practiced and advocated tax resistance as a form of anti-war protest. In 1971, he was named an "unindicted co-conspirator" in the Harrisburg Seven case. During much of this time, he served on the board of directors of the American Civil Liberties Union, Philadelphia affiliate.

As the leader of the Citizens' Commission to Investigate the FBI, Davidon was instrumental in planning and organizing a break-in of the FBI's Media, Pennsylvania office. The documents stolen there led to the disclosure of COINTELPRO. According to The Burglary, a book published shortly after his death, Davidon also had engaged in draft board raids, stealing or destroying files, and subsequent to Media participated in two acts of sabotage against military materiel intended for use in Vietnam. Due at least in part to his exceptionally careful planning and his co-conspirators' total commitment to secrecy and discretion, neither he nor anyone else was ever charged in any of those actions, despite an intense, five-year FBI investigation.

== Family ==
In 1963, Davidon married Ann Morrissett (1925–2004), a noted pacifist/feminist essayist and activist. They had two daughters, Sarah Davidon and Ruth Rodgers. Davidon and Morrissett divorced in 1978. He subsequently married Maxine Libros, who died in 2010. Davidon had a son, Alan (1949– ), from his first marriage to Phyllis Wise (1927–2020).
