= Jana Thieme =

German rower

Personal information
- Born: 6 July 1970 (age 55) Beeskow
Medal record
Women's rowing
Representing East Germany
World Rowing Championships
Gold medal – first place	1989 Bled	Quad sculls
Representing Germany
Olympic Games
Gold medal – first place	2000 Sydney	Double sculls
World Rowing Championships
Gold medal – first place	1993 Račice	Single sculls
Bronze medal – third place	1994 Indianapolis	Double sculls
Gold medal – first place	1995 Tampere	Quad sculls
Gold medal – first place	1998 Cologne	Quad sculls
Gold medal – first place	1999 St. Catharines	Double sculls

Jana Thieme (born 6 July 1970) is a German rower and Olympic champion.

Thieme travelled to Barcelona for the 1992 Summer Olympics as a substitute but did not compete. She competed at the 1996 Summer Olympics. She won a gold medal in double sculls with her partner Kathrin Boron at the 2000 Sydney Olympic Games.

Thieme has won six World Championships and nine German Championships.
