= Min Byeong-sun =

South Korean rower

Personal information
- Nationality: South Korean
- Born: 21 December 1974 (age 51)

Sport
- Sport: Rowing

Min Byeong-sun (Korean: 민병순; born 21 December 1974) is a South Korean rower. She competed in the women's double sculls event at the 1996 Summer Olympics.
