= Irene Eijs =

Dutch rower (born 1966)

Personal information
- Born: 16 December 1966 (age 59)
Medal record
Women's rowing
Representing the Netherlands
Olympic Games
Bronze medal – third place	1996 Atlanta	Double sculls

Irene Elisabeth Maria Eijs (born 16 December 1966 in Wassenaar, South Holland) is a retired rower from the Netherlands, who won a bronze medal in the women's double sculls at the 1996 Summer Olympics in Atlanta, United States alongside Eeke van Nes.
