= Nelleke Penninx =

Dutch rower (born 1971)

Personal information
- Born: 14 September 1971 (age 54)
Medal record
Women's rowing
Representing the Netherlands
Olympic Games
Silver medal – second place	2000 Sydney	Eight

Petronella Wilhelmina Cornelia Penninx (born 14 September 1971 in Loosdrecht, North Holland) is a retired rower from the Netherlands. She won a silver medal in the women's eight with coxswain in the 2000 Summer Olympics in Sydney, Australia. Four years earlier, at the 1996 Summer Olympics in Atlanta, United States, Penninx finished sixth in the women's quadruple sculls.
