= Katrin Gleie =

Danish rower

Personal information
- Nationality: Danish
- Born: 6 June 1978 (age 46)

Sport
- Sport: Rowing

Katrin Gleie (born 6 June 1978) is a Danish rower. She competed in the women's quadruple sculls event at the 2000 Summer Olympics.
