= John Paine (sport shooter) =

American sport shooter

Medal record

Men's shooting

Representing the United States

Olympic Games
Gold medal – first place	1896 Athens	25 m military pistol

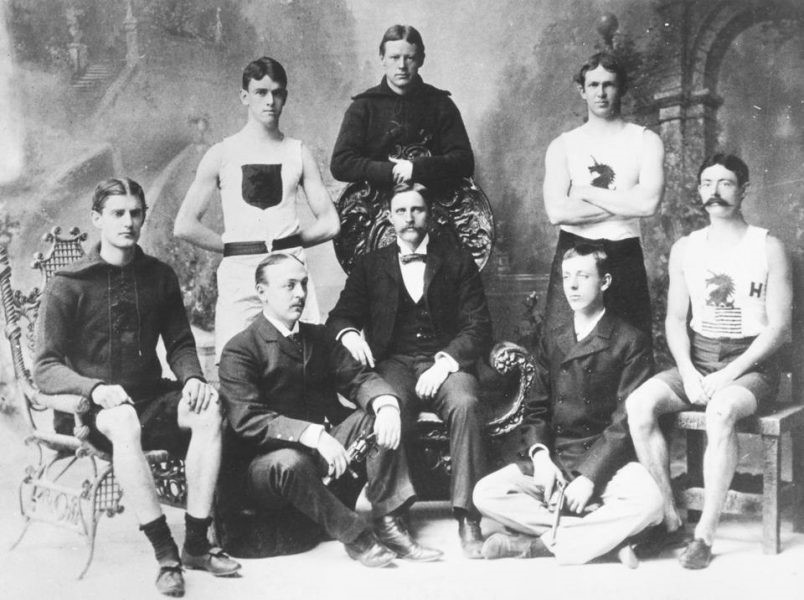
1896 US olympic athletes

John Bryant Paine (April 19, 1870 in Boston, Massachusetts – August 1, 1951 in Weston, Massachusetts) was an American shooter. He competed at the 1896 Summer Olympics in Athens.

Paine was the son of Charles Jackson Paine who was a general in the Union Army during the American Civil War, and also was the younger brother to Sumner Paine. He graduated from Harvard College.

Paine was a member of the Boston Athletic Association, the association were sending over members to Athens for the 1896 Summer Olympics, Paine decided to go along but first stopped in Paris to convince his brother Sumner to join him.

Paine entered all three of the pistol events at the 1896 Games, but actually competed in only one. He, along with his brother Sumner Paine, was disqualified from the rapid fire pistol event for not having the appropriate caliber pistol. Both of the Paines used Colt revolvers, firearms that were far superior to those used by their opponents in the 25 metre military pistol event, John won the event easily, scoring 442 points on 25 hits out of 30 shots, Sumner was not far behind, at 380 points on 23 hits; the third-place finisher, the Greek Nikolaos Morakis, scored only 205 points.

Paine then withdrew from the 30 metre free pistol event, citing his desire to not embarrass his Greek hosts. He also said he had an agreement with his brother that whoever won the first event between them would drop out the next event.

After the Olympics, Paine went on to serve in the Spanish–American War before returning to Boston, Massachusetts, and becoming a wealthy investment banker.

Paine is also the great-grandfather of Cécile Tucker who competed in 1996 Summer Olympics in a rowing event.
