= Crina Violeta Serediuc =

Romanian rower

Personal information
- Nationality: Romanian
- Born: 3 January 1971 (age 54); Suceava, Romania

Sport
- Sport: Rowing

Crina Violeta Serediuc (born 3 January 1971) is a Romanian rower. She competed in the women's quadruple sculls event at the 2000 Summer Olympics.
