= Gaëlle Buniet =

French rower

Personal information
- Nationality: French
- Born: 21 January 1978 (age 47); Grande-Synthe, France

Sport
- Sport: Rowing

Gaëlle Buniet (born 21 January 1978) is a French rower. She competed at the 2000 Summer Olympics and the 2004 Summer Olympics.
