= Dina Miftakhutdynova =

Ukrainian rower (born 1973)

Dina Miftakhutdinova
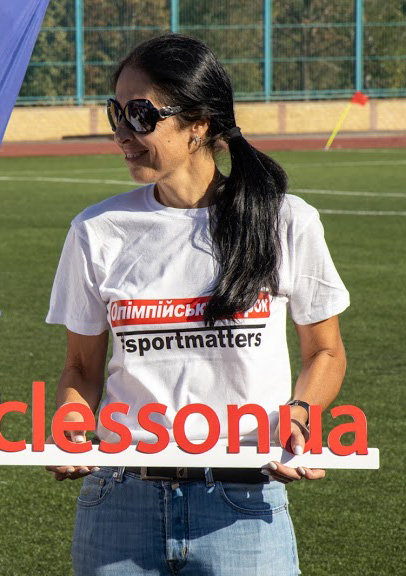
- Dina Miftakhutdynova in 2020

Personal information
- Born: 2 November 1973 (age 52)
Medal record
Women's rowing
Representing Ukraine
Olympic Games
Silver medal – second place	1996 Atlanta	Quadruple sculls
World Rowing Championships
Bronze medal – third place	1994 Indianapolis	Quadruple sculls
Bronze medal – third place	1997 Aiguebelette-le-Lac	Quadruple sculls

Dina Arturivna Miftakhutdinova (Ukrainian: Діна Артурівна Міфтахутдинова; born 2 November 1973) is a retired rower from Ukraine, who won a silver medal at the 1996 Summer Olympics. She is a two-time Olympian. In Atlanta, Georgia her teammates in the women's quadruple sculls were Olena Ronzhyna, Svitlana Maziy, and Inna Frolova.
