= Svitlana Maziy =

Ukrainian rower

Personal information
- Born: 30 January 1968 (age 58) Kiev, Ukrainian SSR, Soviet Union
Medal record
Women's rowing
Olympic Games
Representing the Soviet Union
Silver medal – second place	1988 Seoul	Quadruple sculls
World Rowing Championships
Silver medal – second place	1989 Bled	Quadruple sculls
Bronze medal – third place	1987 Copenhagen	Quadruple sculls
Representing Ukraine
Silver medal – second place	1996 Atlanta	Quadruple sculls
World Rowing Championships
Silver medal – second place	1999 St. Catharines	Quadruple sculls
Bronze medal – third place	1994 Indianapolis	Quadruple sculls
Bronze medal – third place	1997 Aiguebelette-le-Lac	Quadruple sculls

Svitlana Ivanivna Maziy (Ukrainian: Світлана Іванівна Мазій; born 30 January 1968 in Kiev) is a retired rower from Ukraine, who twice won an Olympic medal during her career. She is a four-time Olympian.

After having won the silver medal for the Soviet Union in the Women's Quadruple Sculls at the 1988 Summer Olympics Frolova repeated that feat, rowing for independent Ukraine at the 1996 Summer Olympics. In Atlanta, Georgia her team mates were Olena Ronzhyna, Inna Frolova, and Dina Miftakhutdynova.
