= Cao Mianying =

Chinese rower

Personal information
- Born: 12 August 1967 (age 59) Haiyan County, Zhejiang, China
Medal record
Women's rowing
Representing China
Olympic Games
| Silver medal – second place | 1996 Atlanta | Double sculls |
World Rowing Championships
| Gold medal – first place | 1993 Racice | Quadruple sculls |
| Silver medal – second place | 1989 Bled | Coxless four |
| Silver medal – second place | 1994 Indianapolis | Quadruple sculls |
Summer Universiade
| Bronze medal – third place | 1989 Duisburg | Coxless four |
Asian Games
| Gold medal – first place | 1990 Beijing | Single sculls |
| Gold medal – first place | 1994 Hiroshima | Single sculls |

Cao Mianying (Chinese: 曹棉英; born 12 August 1967) is a Chinese rower. She won a silver medal in double sculls with her partner Zhang Xiuyun at the 1996 Atlanta Olympic Games. She also competed at the 1988 Summer Olympics and 1992 Summer Olympics.

She is from Haiyan County, Zhejiang province. She graduated from Beijing Sport University in sports training. She is responsible for training the national rowing women's team.

She is a member of the Communist Party. In 2008, she became a delegate in the 11th National People's Congress, where she has repeatedly emphasised the importance of the development of sports.
