= Klara Min =

South Korean pianist (born c. 1976)

- Born: Min Yu-kyoung; 1975 or 1976 (age 49–50); Seoul, South Korea
- Occupation: Classical pianist

Korean name
- Hangul: 민유경
- RR: Min Yugyeong
- MR: Min Yugyŏng

Klara Yu-Kyoung Min (born c. 1976) is a South Korean-born classical pianist. She has performed in North America, Germany, Switzerland, France, Italy and South Korea in such venues as New York's Carnegie Hall, Merkin Hall, Barge Music, Gasteig Hall in Munich, Berlin Philharmonie Hall, and KBS Broadcast hall in Seoul.

== Education ==
Born into a musical family in Seoul, South Korea, Min started her first piano lessons despite what her composer mother said to her, when she refused to teach her. However, once she had made her choice, her mother was supportive of that decision. She received her musical education at Yewon School and Seoul Arts High School and continued her studies at the Manhattan School of Music. Min received a bachelor's degree with Solomon Mikowsky and a master's degree with Byron Janis. She has Aufbaustudium (Konzertexamen) at Lübeck Academy of Music in Germany with James Tocco.

== Career ==
Min made her New York recital debut in 2002 at Carnegie Hall's Weill Recital Hall in which she performed the US premiere of Unsuk Chin's Piano Études (selections). She has performed extensively throughout North America and Europe as well as in her home country of South Korea, in venues including Carnegie Hall's Weill Recital Hall, the Alice Tully Hall at the Lincoln Center in New York City, Gasteig in Munich, Berlin Philharmonie, Laeiszhalle in Hamburg, Wigmore Hall in London and KBS Broadcast Hall in Seoul. She has performed with orchestras such as the Korean Symphony Orchestra, Seoul Symphony Orchestra, sinfonie orchester berlin, Hamburger Kammerphilharmonie, Manhattan Chamber Orchestra, New York Sinfonietta, Fairbanks Symphony Orchestra and the American Chamber Orchestra.

Min established the as New York Concert Artists & Associates as "a modern-day realization of Robert Schumann's Alliance of David (Davidsbund), an imagined spiritual fraternity of creative minds".

Min's first album, Ripples on Water, features modern Korean piano music. It was released on Naxos. Her second release of a selection of Chopin's Mazurkas was released on Delos. The American Record Guide selected the album as one of six critics' choices in 2013 raving that "her dynamic control is out of this world". Both albums are frequently broadcast on WQXR/WNYC radio stations. Min's future recording engagements include a CD of Chopin and Scriabin for the Steinway & Sons record label and two further CDs for Delos, one of piano concertos by Beethoven and the other titled Fosteriana with character pieces by the American composer Henry Martin based on Stephen Foster's songs.

Min was the recipient of a Samsung scholarship. She became a Steinway Artist in 2014 and is based in Berlin and New York.

=== Faculty ===
Min has been a piano faculty member at Wesleyan University in Connecticut and an assistant teacher at Cincinnati Conservatory of Music at the University of Cincinnati.

== Awards ==
Min is a recipient of the Samsung scholarship. Other competition prizes include a Grand Prize at the IBLA Grand Prize International Competition, Best Performance of Mozart at the Viotti-Valsesia International Piano Competition in Italy, and a top prize at the World Piano Competition in Cincinnati.

Her performances have been praised by New York Concert Review as "a lovely, nuanced tone, genuine expressiveness, excellent technique, exuberance and vitality" and by the Polish newspaper Przegląd Polski as "a beautiful, rich sound and splendid vitality". The Cincinnati Enquirer said that "although she is petite, she has steely nerves".

== Personal life ==
Min resides in New York City.
