= Sumner Paine =

American sport shooter

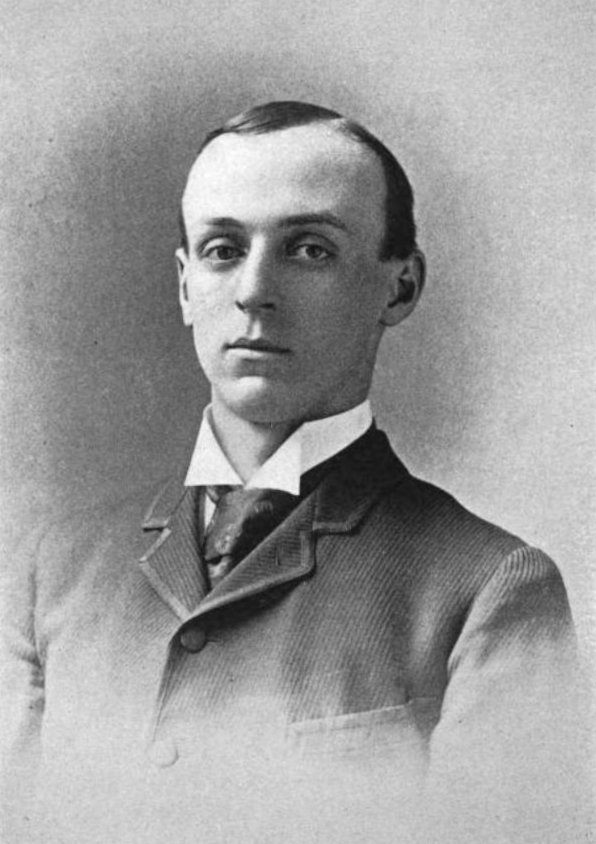

Medal record

Men's shooting

Representing the United States

Olympic Games
Gold medal – first place	1896 Athens	30 m free pistol
Silver medal – second place	1896 Athens	25 m military pistol

Sumner Paine (May 13, 1868 – April 18, 1904) was an American shooter. He competed at the 1896 Summer Olympics in Athens.

== Biography ==
Sumner Paine was born in Boston on May 13, 1868. His father was Charles Jackson Paine, who was a general in the Union Army during the American Civil War, and also was the older brother to John Paine. Sumner briefly attended Harvard University before ending up at the University of Colorado School of Medicine, he earned an M.D. but never practiced, instead he went off to Paris, France, to work.

Paine entered all three of the pistol events in the 1896 Games. He, along with his brother John Paine, was disqualified from the rapid fire pistol because their firearms were not of the appropriate caliber.

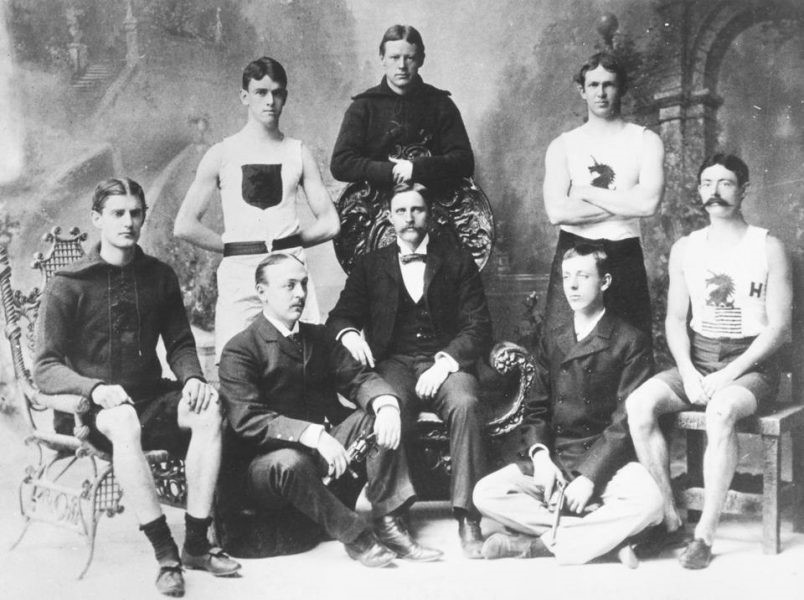
Paine, seated second from left, with other members of the 1896 Olympic team

The Paine brothers used Colt revolvers in the 25 metre military pistol event, these pistols were superior to the arms used by their opponents, and the brothers had little difficulty winning the top two spots. Sumner finished second with 380 points on 23 hits (of 30 shots) to John's 442 points on 25 hits. The next closest shooter (Nikolaos Morakis from Greece) scored only 205 points.

After winning the military pistol, John withdrew from the 30 metre free pistol event, Sumner easily won this event as well, scoring exactly the same number of points (442) as John had to win the military pistol event, he did this on one fewer hit (24), though, in this case, the second place competitor scored 285 points.

In 1901, Paine went home to find his wife in bed with his daughter's music teacher. To ward him away from the house, he fired four shots at him, missing each time. He was briefly jailed and charged with assault until the police realized who he was and accepted that he must have missed on purpose. He was then released.

Paine died in Boston on April 18, 1904, at age 35, due to pneumonia.
