= Olena Ronzhyna =

Ukrainian rower (born 1970)

Personal information
- Full name: Olena Ronzhyna-Morozova
- Born: 18 November 1970 (age 55) Dnipropetrovsk, Ukrainian SSR, Soviet Union
Medal record
Women's rowing
Representing Ukraine
Olympic Games
Silver medal – second place	1996 Atlanta	Quadruple sculls
Disqualified	2004 Athens	Quadruple sculls
World Rowing Championships
Silver medal – second place	1999 St. Catharines	Quadruple sculls
Bronze medal – third place	1994 Indianapolis	Quadruple sculls
Bronze medal – third place	1997 Aiguebelette-le-Lac	Quadruple sculls

Olena Ivanivna Ronzhyna-Morozova (Ukrainian: Олена Іванівна Ронжина-Морозова; born 18 November 1970 in Dnipropetrovsk) is a retired rower from Ukraine, who won a silver medal at the 1996 Summer Olympics. She is a four-time Olympian.

Ronzhyna competed for the Unified Team at the 1992 Summer Olympics. She was a member of the Ukrainian team at the 1996 Summer Olympics in Atlanta, winning a silver medal in the women's quadruple sculls with teammates Inna Frolova, Svitlana Maziy, and Dina Miftakhutdynova. At her last Olympic appearance in 2004, she was disqualified with her team after one of her teammates, Olena Olefirenko, tested positive for ethamivan.
