= Irina Fedotova (rower) =

Russian rower

Medal record

Representing Russia

Olympic Games

Women's rowing
Bronze medal – third place	2000 Sydney	Quadruple sculls

Irina Mikhaylovna Fedotova (Russian: Ирина Михайловна Федотова, (born 15 February 1975 in Krasnodar) is a Russian rower who competed for the Russia in the three Summer Olympics.

In 2000, she was a crew member of the Russia boat which won the bronze medal in the quadruple sculls event.
