= Min Jong-gi =

South Korean politician

Min Jong-gi is a South Korean politician charged with corruption. He is currently the governor of Dangjin County in South Chungcheong Province, where he has brought development to the area. In late April 2010, he was detained by government officials as he was about to leave the country but was not held in custody. He had in his possession a forged passport. The government was pursuing him because of allegations that he had given construction contracts in exchange for a villa and that he had run a slush fund worth nearly two million dollars while only reporting assets of under $550,000.

== Biography ==
Min obtained a bachelor's degree from the prestigious South Korean Air Force Academy and a doctorate from an American university. He later became director of the province's regional economic bureau and then deputy mayor of Nonsan and Cheonan.
