= Dorthe Pedersen =

Danish rower (born 1977)

Medal record

Women's rowing

Representing Denmark

World Rowing Championships
Silver medal – second place	1997 Aiguebelette	W4x
Silver medal – second place	2002 Seville	W4x

Dorthe Pedersen (born 5 November 1977 in Nykøbing Falster) is a Danish rower.
