= Oksana Dorodnova =

Russian rower

Olympic medal record

Women's Rowing
Bronze medal – third place	2000 Sydney	quadruple sculls

Оksana Anatolyevna Dorodnova (Russian: Оксана Анатольевна Дороднова, (born 14 April 1974 in Moscow) is a Russian rower who competed for the Russia in the four Summer Olympics.

In 2000, she was a crew member of the Russia boat which won the bronze medal in the quadruple sculls event.
