= Sarah Lauritzen =

Danish rower (born 1976)

Medal record

Women's rowing

Representing Denmark

World Rowing Championships
Silver medal – second place	1997 Aiguebelette	W4x
Silver medal – second place	2002 Seville	W4x

Sarah Lauritzen (born 27 February 1976 in Copenhagen) is a Danish rower.
