= Eeke van Nes =

Dutch rower (born 1969)

Personal information
- Born: 17 April 1969 (age 57) Delft, the Netherlands
- Height: 1.86 m (6 ft 1 in)
- Weight: 73 kg (161 lb)

Sport
- Sport: Rowing
- Club: Delftsche Studenten-Roeivereeniging LAGA
Medal record
Women's rowing
Representing the Netherlands
Olympic Games
Silver medal – second place	2000 Sydney	Double sculls
Silver medal – second place	2000 Sydney	Eight
Bronze medal – third place	1996 Atlanta	Double sculls
World Rowing Championships
Silver medal – second place	1995 Tampere	Double sculls
Silver medal – second place	1998 Cologne	Double sculls
Bronze medal – third place	1995 Tampere	Quad sculls
Bronze medal – third place	1999 St. Catharines	Double sculls

Eeke Geertruida van Nes (born 17 April 1969) is a retired rower from the Netherlands. She won three Olympic medals, a bronze in the double sculls in 1996, with Irene Eijs, and two silver medals in 2000, in eights and double sculls. Between 1995 and 1999 she won four medals at the world championships.

Van Nes is a daughter of the rowers Hadriaan van Nes and Meike de Vlas and granddaughter of football player Jan Thomée.
