= Céline Garcia =

French rower

Personal information
- Nationality: French
- Born: 6 January 1976 (age 49); Dole, France

Sport
- Sport: Rowing

Céline Garcia (born 6 January 1976) is a French rower. She competed at the 1996 Summer Olympics and the 2000 Summer Olympics.
