= Birutė Šakickienė =

Lithuanian rower (born 1968)

Olympic medal record

Women's Rowing
Bronze medal – third place	2000 Sydney	Double Scull

Birutė Šakickienė (born 26 November 1968) is a Lithuanian rower who won an Olympic bronze medal in the Double Sculls event at the 2000 Summer Olympics in Sydney. She also competed at the 1996 Summer Olympics.
