= Liu Lin (rower) =

Chinese rower

Personal information
- Nationality: Chinese
- Born: 10 January 1977 (age 48)

Sport
- Sport: Rowing

Liu Lin (born 10 January 1977) is a Chinese rower. She competed in two events at the 2000 Summer Olympics.
