= Bronwyn Roye =

Australian rower

Personal information
- Born: 18 July 1970 (age 55)

Sport
- Sport: Rowing
- Club: St George Rowing Club; UTS Haberfield Rowing Club
Medal record
Women's rowing
Representing Australia
World Rowing Championships
Bronze medal – third place	1998 Cologne	W4X
Commonwealth Rowing Championships
Gold medal – first place	1994 Ontario	W1X

Bronwyn Roye (born 18 July 1970 in Sydney) is an Australian former rower. She is a six-time national champion, a medalist at World Championships and a dual Olympian who raced in two Australian sculling events at the 1996 Summer Olympics.

== Club and state rowing ==
Roye's senior club rowing was initially from the St George Rowing Club on Sydney's Cooks River and then from the UTS Haberfield Rowing Club.

Roye made state selection for New South Wales in 1994 in the state women's coxless four to contest the ULVA Trophy at the Interstate Regatta within the Australian Rowing Championships. In 1995 she was the New South Wales single sculls entrant selected to race for the Nell Slatter Trophy at the Interstate Regatta. In 1996 she raced both the state coxless four and the single scull, winning the Nell Slatter Trophy in the single. She again contested the interstate single sculls title from 1997 to 2000 winning that title in 1997 and 1999.

In UTS Haberfield colours she contested the open women's single scull title at the Australian Rowing Championships on seven consecutive occasion from 1994 to 2000. She won that national title in 1996, 1999 and 2000.

== International representative rowing ==
Roye's Australian representative debut came in 1994 as a single sculler. At the 1994 World Rowing Championships in Indianapolis she was Australia's single sculls entrant and finished in fifth place.

In 1995 she rowed in the Australian senior women's double scull. She raced with West Australian Emmy Snook at 1995 World Rowing Championships in Tampere to fourth place. She then moved in to the Australian women's quad scull and with Sally Newmarch, Marina Hatzakis and Jane Robinson she competed at the 1996 Atlanta Olympics finishing ninth overall. In Atlanta Roye also doubled up with Marina Hatzakis in the women's double scull and finished in fourth place.

In 1997 Roye rowed in the double scull at the World Rowing Cup I but not at the World Championships. She came back into the senior quad in 1998 with Hatzakis, Robinson and Newmarch and after racing at the World Rowing Cup III in Lucerne, they competed at the 1998 World Rowing Championships in Cologne and won a bronze medal.

Roye's final two years of representative rowing was with Hatzakis in the Australian women's double scull. They raced at the 1999 World Rowing Cup III in Lucerne and then at the 1999 World Rowing Championships in St Catharines, Canada to a sixth place finish. Their campaign in the 2000 Olympic year started at two World Rowing Cups in Europe and then at Sydney 2000 they placed fourth in their heat and fought through a repechage to make the final in which they finished last for an overall sixth ranking. It was the conclusion of Roye's representative career.
