= Marina Hatzakis =

Australian rower (born 1972)

Marina Ann Hatzakis
Personal information
- Born: 7 March 1972 (age 54)

Sport
- Sport: Rowing
- Club: Queensland Uni Boat Club; UTS Haberfield Rowing Club
Medal record
Women's rowing
Representing Australia
World Rowing Championships
Bronze medal – third place	1998 Cologne	Quad scull
Commonwealth Rowing Championships
Gold medal – first place	1994 Ontario	Quad scull

Marina Ann Hatzakis (born 7 March 1972 in Sydney) is an Australian former rower - a dual Olympian who represented at world championships between 1993 and 2000.

== Club and state rowing ==
Hatzakis' senior club rowing was from the Queensland University Boat Club in Brisbane and later at the UTS Haberfield Rowing Club in Sydney.

From 1993 to 1996 and in 2000 Hatzakis was selected as Queensland's single sculls representative to contest the Nell Slatter Trophy at the Interstate Regatta within the Australian Rowing Championships. In 1996 she also stroked Queensland's women's coxless four contesting the ULVA Trophy. In 1997 Hatzakis relocated to Sydney to pursue her national aspirations. That year she was selected to stroke the New South Wales women's coxless four to contest the ULVA Trophy.

She contested national championship titles at numerous Australian Rowing Championships. She contested the open women's single scull in QUBC colours in 1994, 1995 and 1996 and in black and white for UTS Haberfield in 1997 and 2000.

== International representative rowing ==
Hatzakis' Australian representative debut came in 1993 as a sculler. She competed at the 1993 World Rowing Championships in Racice in a double scull with Jenny Luff and placed ninth overall.

In 1994 she moved into the Australian senior women's quad scull. She was in the quad at the 1994 World Rowing Championships in Indianapolis who rowed to fourth place. Hatzakis and Sally Newmarch were constant in the quad for the next three years. With Adair Ferguson and Fleur Spriggs they contested the 1995 World Rowing Championships in Tampere placing thirteenth and then with Jane Robinson and Bronwyn Roye they competed at the 1996 Atlanta Olympics finishing ninth overall. In Atlanta Hatzakis also doubled up with Bronwyn Roye in the women's double scull and finished in fourth place.

Hatzakis rowed in 1997 at the World Rowing Cup I with Bronwyn Roye in a double scull but was not selected for World Championships that year. She came back into the senior quad in 1998 with Newmarch, Robinson and Roye and after racing at the World Rowing Cup III in Lucerne, they competed at the 1998 World Rowing Championships in Cologne and won a bronze medal.

Hatzakis' final two years of representative rowing was with Roye in the Australian women's double scull. They raced at the 1999 World Rowing Cup III in Lucerne and then at the 1999 World Rowing Championships in St Catharines, Canada to a sixth-place finish. Their campaign in the 2000 Olympic year started at two World Rowing Cups in Europe and then at Sydney 2000 they placed fourth in their heat and fought through a repechage to make the final in which they finished last for an overall sixth ranking.
