= Ruth Davidon =

American rower

Personal information
- Born: March 20, 1964 (age 62) New York City, United States

Sport
- Sport: Rowing
Medal record
Women's rowing
Representing United States
World Rowing Championships
Bronze medal – third place	1993 Račice	W4x
Pan American Games
Silver medal – second place	1995 Mar del Plata	W1x
Silver medal – second place	1995 Mar del Plata	W4x

Ruth Anna Davidon Rodgers (born March 20, 1964, in New York City) is an American rower and medical doctor. As Ruth Davidon, she finished 6th in the single sculls at the 1996 Summer Olympics and 4th in the double sculls at the 2000 Summer Olympics.

A San Francisco-area anaesthesiologist who practices under the name Ruth A. Rodgers, M.D., her parents were essayist Ann Morrissett and physicist William C. Davidon, noted peace and justice activists.
