= Rowing at the 1992 Summer Olympics – Men's quadruple sculls =

Men's quadruple sculls at the Games of the XXV Olympiad
- Date: 28 July – 2 August 1992
- Competitors: 60 from 15 nations

Medalists
1st place, gold medalist(s)		Andreas Hajek; Michael Steinbach; Stephan Volkert; André Willms	Germany
2nd place, silver medalist(s)		Kjetil Undset; Per Sætersdal; Lars Bjønness; Rolf Thorsen	Norway
3rd place, bronze medalist(s)		Alessandro Corona; Gianluca Farina; Rossano Galtarossa; Filippo Soffici	Italy

The men's quadruple sculls competition at the 1992 Summer Olympics took place at took place at Lake of Banyoles, Spain.

== Competition format ==
The competition consisted of three main rounds (heats, semifinals, and finals) as well as a repechage. The 15 boats were divided into three heats for the first round, with 5 boats in each heat. The top three boats in each heat (9 boats total) advanced directly to the semifinals. The remaining 6 boats (4th and 5th place in each heat) were placed in the repechage. The repechage featured a single heat. The top three boats in the repechage advanced to the semifinals. The remaining three boats (4th, 5th, and 6th place in the repechage) were placed in the "C" final to compete for 13th through 15th places.

The 12 semifinalist boats were divided into two heats of 6 boats each. The top three boats in each semifinal (6 boats total) advanced to the "A" final to compete for medals and 4th through 6th place; the bottom three boats in each semifinal were sent to the "B" final for 7th through 12th.

All races were over a 2000 metre course.

== Results ==
=== Heats ===
==== Heat 1 ====
Rank	Rowers	Nation	Time	Notes
1	Andreas Hajek; Michael Steinbach; Stephan Volkert; André Willms	Germany	5:45.65	Q
2	Alessandro Corona; Gianluca Farina; Rossano Galtarossa; Filippo Soffici	Italy	5:46.47	Q
3	Valeriy Dosenko; Sergey Kinyakin; Mykola Chupryna; Girts Vilks	Unified Team	5:52.69	Q
4	Fredrik Hultén; Tommy Österlund; David Svensson; Per-Olof Claesson	Sweden	5:56.00	R
5	Mike Harris; Roger Brown; Guy Pooley; Peter Haining	Great Britain	5:57.18	R

==== Heat 2 ====
Rank	Rowers	Nation	Time	Notes
1	Fiorenzo Di Giovanni; Fabrice LeClerc; Yves Lamarque; Samuel Barathay	France	5:47.80	Q
2	Hans Keldermann; Ronald Florijn; Koos Maasdijk; Rutger Arisz	Netherlands	5:49.39	Q
3	Dirk Crois; Alain Lewuillon; Tom Symoens; Wim Van Belleghem	Belgium	5:53.47	Q
4	Marek Gawkowski; Piotr Bujnarowski; Cezary Jędrzycki; Jarosław Janowski	Poland	5:54.13	R
5	Günther Schuster; Walter Kaiser; Gert Port; Horst Nußbaumer	Austria	6:01.12	R

==== Heat 3 ====
Rank	Rowers	Nation	Time	Notes
1	Kjetil Undset; Per Sætersdal; Lars Bjønness; Rolf Thorsen	Norway	5:46.83	Q
2	Ueli Bodenmann; Alexander Rückstuhl; Beat Schwerzmann; Marc-Sven Nater	Switzerland	5:47.16	Q
3	Richard Powell; Hamish McGlashan; Robin Bakker; Jason Day	Australia	5:49.15	Q
4	Keir Pearson; John Riley; Bob Kaehler; Chip McKibben	United States	5:49.28	R
5	José Antonio Rodríguez; Melquiades Verduras; Bruno López; José Manuel Bermúdez	Spain	5:55.59	R

=== Repechage ===
Rank	Rowers	Nation	Time	Notes
1	Keir Pearson; John Riley; Bob Kaehler; Chip McKibben	United States	5:56.98	Q
2	José Antonio Rodríguez; Melquiades Verduras; Bruno López; José Manuel Bermúdez	Spain	5:57.41	Q
3	Marek Gawkowski; Piotr Bujnarowski; Cezary Jędrzycki; Jarosław Janowski	Poland	5:59.03	Q
4	Fredrik Hultén; Tommy Österlund; David Svensson; Per-Olof Claesson	Sweden	5:59.47	QC
5	Mike Harris; Roger Brown; Guy Pooley; Peter Haining	Great Britain	6:00.52	QC
6	Günther Schuster; Walter Kaiser; Gert Port; Horst Nußbaumer	Austria	6:02.96	QC

=== Semifinals ===
==== Semifinal 1 ====
Rank	Rowers	Nation	Time	Notes
1	Andreas Hajek; Michael Steinbach; Stephan Volkert; André Willms	Germany	5:46.65	QA
2	Ueli Bodenmann; Alexander Rückstuhl; Beat Schwerzmann; Marc-Sven Nater	Switzerland	5:48.12	QA
3	Fiorenzo Di Giovanni; Fabrice LeClerc; Yves Lamarque; Samuel Barathay	France	5:48.72	QA
4	Valeriy Dosenko; Sergey Kinyakin; Mykola Chupryna; Girts Vilks	Unified Team	5:49.58	QB
5	Marek Gawkowski; Piotr Bujnarowski; Cezary Jędrzycki; Jarosław Janowski	Poland	6:05.31	QB
6	Dirk Crois; Alain Lewuillon; Tom Symoens; Wim Van Belleghem	Belgium	6:05.87	QB

==== Semifinal 2 ====
Rank	Rowers	Nation	Time	Notes
1	Alessandro Corona; Gianluca Farina; Rossano Galtarossa; Filippo Soffici	Italy	5:48.72	QA
2	Kjetil Undset; Per Sætersdal; Lars Bjønness; Rolf Thorsen	Norway	5:49.53	QA
3	Hans Keldermann; Ronald Florijn; Koos Maasdijk; Rutger Arisz	Netherlands	5:50.12	QA
4	Keir Pearson; John Riley; Bob Kaehler; Chip McKibben	United States	5:52.48	QB
5	Richard Powell; Hamish McGlashan; Robin Bakker; Jason Day	Australia	5:55.62	QB
6	José Antonio Rodríguez; Melquiades Verduras; Bruno López; José Manuel Bermúdez	Spain	5:58.77	QB

=== Finals ===
==== Final C ====
Rank	Rowers	Nation	Time
13	Mike Harris; Roger Brown; Guy Pooley; Peter Haining	Great Britain	6:08.92
14	Günther Schuster; Walter Kaiser; Gert Port; Horst Nußbaumer	Austria	6:13.75
15	Fredrik Hultén; Tommy Österlund; David Svensson; Per-Olof Claesson	Sweden	6:20.86

==== Final B ====
Rank	Rowers	Nation	Time
7	Valeriy Dosenko; Sergey Kinyakin; Mykola Chupryna; Girts Vilks	Unified Team	5:54.48
8	Keir Pearson; John Riley; Bob Kaehler; Chip McKibben	United States	5:55.06
9	Richard Powell; Hamish McGlashan; Robin Bakker; Jason Day	Australia	5:56.44
10	José Antonio Rodríguez; Melquiades Verduras; Bruno López; José Manuel Bermúdez	Spain	5:58.33
11	Marek Gawkowski; Piotr Bujnarowski; Cezary Jędrzycki; Jarosław Janowski	Poland	6:01.18
12	Dirk Crois; Alain Lewuillon; Tom Symoens; Wim Van Belleghem	Belgium	6:01.38

==== Final A ====
Rank	Rowers	Nation	Time
1st place, gold medalist(s)	Andreas Hajek; Michael Steinbach; Stephan Volkert; André Willms	Germany	5:45.17
2nd place, silver medalist(s)	Kjetil Undset; Per Sætersdal; Lars Bjønness; Rolf Thorsen	Norway	5:47.09
3rd place, bronze medalist(s)	Alessandro Corona; Gianluca Farina; Rossano Galtarossa; Filippo Soffici	Italy	5:47.33
4	Ueli Bodenmann; Alexander Rückstuhl; Beat Schwerzmann; Marc-Sven Nater	Switzerland	5:47.39
5	Hans Keldermann; Ronald Florijn; Koos Maasdijk; Rutger Arisz	Netherlands	5:48.92
6	Fiorenzo Di Giovanni; Fabrice LeClerc; Yves Lamarque; Samuel Barathay	France	5:54.80

== Final classification ==
The following rowers took part:

Rank	Rowers	Country
1st place, gold medalist(s)	Andreas Hajek; Michael Steinbach; Stephan Volkert; André Willms	Germany
2nd place, silver medalist(s)	Kjetil Undset; Per Sætersdal; Lars Bjønness; Rolf Thorsen	Norway
3rd place, bronze medalist(s)	Alessandro Corona; Gianluca Farina; Rossano Galtarossa; Filippo Soffici	Italy
	Ueli Bodenmann; Alexander Rückstuhl; Beat Schwerzmann; Marc-Sven Nater	Switzerland
	Hans Keldermann; Ronald Florijn; Koos Maasdijk; Rutger Arisz	Netherlands
	Fiorenzo Di Giovanni; Fabrice LeClerc; Yves Lamarque; Samuel Barathay	France
	Valeriy Dosenko; Sergey Kinyakin; Mykola Chupryna; Girts Vilks	Unified Team
	Keir Pearson; John Riley; Bob Kaehler; Chip McKibben	United States
	Richard Powell; Hamish McGlashan; Robin Bakker; Jason Day	Australia
	José Antonio Rodríguez; Melquiades Verduras; Bruno López; José Manuel Bermúdez	Spain
	Marek Gawkowski; Piotr Bujnarowski; Cezary Jędrzycki; Jarosław Janowski	Poland
	Dirk Crois; Alain Lewuillon; Tom Symoens; Wim Van Belleghem	Belgium
	Mike Harris; Roger Brown; Guy Pooley; Peter Haining	Great Britain
	Günther Schuster; Walter Kaiser; Gert Port; Horst Nußbaumer	Austria
	Fredrik Hultén; Tommy Österlund; David Svensson; Per-Olof Claesson	Sweden
