= Rowing at the 1992 Summer Olympics – Men's single sculls =

Olympic rowing event

Men's single sculls at the Games of the XXV Olympiad
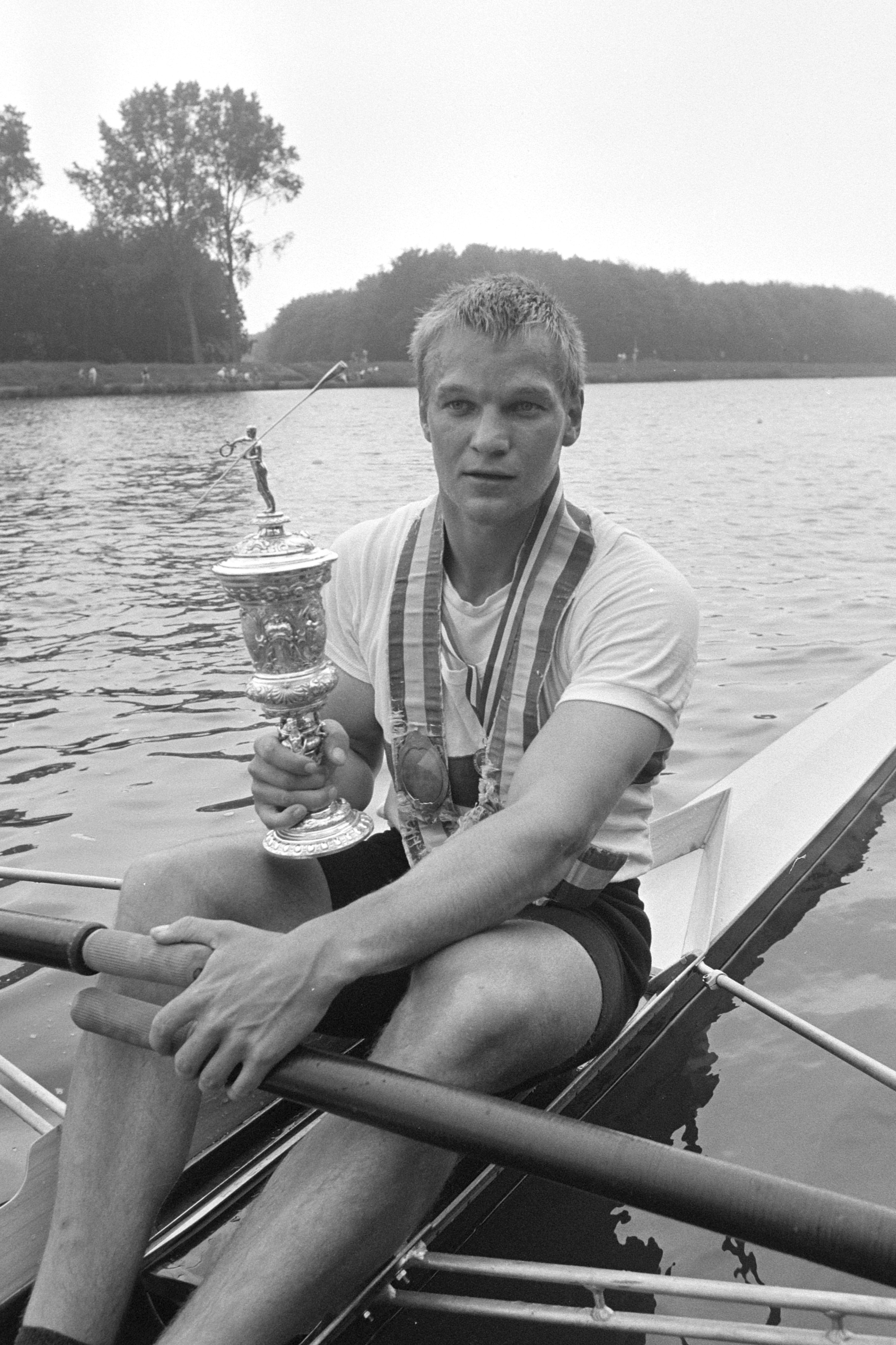
- Gold medalist Thomas Lange (1987)
- Venue: Lake of Banyoles
- Dates: 27 July – 1 August 1992
- Competitors: 22 from 22 nations
- Winning time: 6:51.40

Medalists
1st place, gold medalist(s)		Thomas Lange; Germany
2nd place, silver medalist(s)		Václav Chalupa; Czechoslovakia
3rd place, bronze medalist(s)		Kajetan Broniewski; Poland

The men's single sculls competition at the 1992 Summer Olympics in Barcelona was held from 27 July to 1 August at Lake of Banyoles. The event was an open-style, individual rowing event conducted as part of the Rowing at the 1992 Summer Olympics programme. There were 22 competitors from 22 nations, with each nation limited to a single boat in the event. The event was won by Thomas Lange of Germany, the fourth man to successfully repeat as Olympic champion (after his victory in 1988 on the East German team). It was the first appearance of "Germany" since 1936 (when Gustav Schäfer won the gold medal), though German rowers representing the United Team of Germany, West Germany, and East Germany had won 10 medals in 8 Games from 1960 to 1988. Václav Chalupa of Czechoslovakia took silver, that nation's first medal in the men's single sculls. Poland's Kajetan Broniewski earned that nation's first medal in the event since 1960 with his bronze.

== Background ==
This was the 21st appearance of the event. Rowing had been on the programme in 1896 but was cancelled due to bad weather. The single sculls has been held every time that rowing has been contested, beginning in 1900.

Six of the 22 single scullers from the 1988 Games returned: gold medallist Thomas Lange of East Germany (now competing for unified Germany), bronze medalist Eric Verdonk of New Zealand, fifth-place finisher Kajetan Broniewski of Poland, seventh-place finisher (and three-time gold medalist from 1976 to 1984) Pertti Karppinen of Finland, eighth-place finisher Jüri Jaanson of the Soviet Union (now competing for Estonia), and eleventh-place finisher Jesus Posse of Uruguay. Lange was favoured to repeat, but there was a strong field. Lange had won the 1989 and 1991 World Championships, while Jaanson had won in 1990. Václav Chalupa of Czechoslovakia had been the runner-up all three years, as well as winning the 1989 Diamond Challenge Sculls. Joaquín Gómez of Mexico was the Pan American champion. Verdonk was also a Diamond Challenge winner in 1990.

Latvia, Lebanon, and Turkey each made their debut in the event; some former Soviet republics competed together as the Unified Team. The United States made its 17th appearance, most among nations.

== Competition format ==
This rowing event was a single scull event, meaning that each boat was propelled by a single rower. The "scull" portion means that the rower used two oars, one on each side of the boat. The course used the 2000 metres distance that became the Olympic standard in 1912.

The tournament used the four-round format (three main rounds and a repechage) that had been used since 1968. The competition continued to use the six-boat heat standardised in 1960. The ranking races expanded from the "B" final for ranking 7th through 12th place introduced in 1964 to having four finals, "D" through "A", that ranked every boat. Additional "C/D" or consolation semifinals were added as well.

- Quarterfinals: Four heats of 5 or 6 boats each. The top boat in each heat (4 total) advanced directly to the "A/B" semifinals. The remaining boats (18 total) went to the repechage.
- Repechage: Four heats of 4 or 5 boats each. The top two boats in each heat (8 total) rejoined the quarterfinal winners in the "A/B" semifinals. The other boats (10 total) went to the "C/D" semifinals, where they were no longer competing for medals.
- Semifinals: Four semifinals. Two "A/B" semifinals of 6 boats each for boats still in contention for medals; the top three boats in each heat (6 total) advanced to Final A, the remaining boats (6 total) went to Final B. Two "C/D" semifinals were used to sort remaining boats into ranking finals with no chance of medals; the top three boats in each heat (6 total) went to Final C while the remaining boats (4 total) went to Final D.
- Final: Four finals. Final A consisted of the top 6 boats. Final B placed boats 7 through 12. Final C placed boats 13 through 18. Final D placed boats 19 through 22.

== Schedule ==
All times are Central European Summer Time (UTC+2)

Date	Time	Round
Monday, 27 July 1992	11:10	Quarterfinals
Wednesday, 29 July 1992	10:30	Repechage
Thursday, 30 July 1992	9:20	Semifinals
Saturday, 1 August 1992	7:40	Finals

== Results ==
=== Quarterfinals ===
The winner of each heat is qualified for the "A/B" semifinals. 2nd–6th placed rowers advance to the repechage round.

==== Quarterfinal 1 ====
Rank	Rower	Nation	Time	Notes
1	Václav Chalupa	Czechoslovakia	7:06.01	QAB
2	Wade Hall-Craggs	Great Britain	7:11.58	R
3	Gábor Mitring	Hungary	7:11.93	R
4	Greg Walker	United States	7:13.62	R
5	Jesús Posse	Uruguay	7:38.96	R
6	Niall O'Toole	Ireland	7:50.46	R

==== Quarterfinal 2 ====
Rank	Rower	Nation	Time	Notes
1	Sergio Fernández	Argentina	6:59.14	QAB
2	Jüri Jaanson	Estonia	7:00.85	R
3	Xeno Müller	Switzerland	7:06.20	R
4	Joaquín Gómez	Mexico	7:08.77	R
5	Uģis Lasmanis	Latvia	7:14.61	R
6	Frans Göbel	Netherlands	7:17.75	R

==== Quarterfinal 3 ====
Rank	Rower	Nation	Time	Notes
1	Thomas Lange	Germany	7:08.13	QAB
2	Kajetan Broniewski	Poland	7:11.01	R
3	Massimo Marconcini	Italy	7:17.67	R
4	Konstantinos Kariotis	Greece	7:23.00	R
—	Ali Rıza Bilal	Turkey	DNF	R

==== Quarterfinal 4 ====
Rank	Rower	Nation	Time	Notes
1	Harald Faderbauer	Austria	6:57.72	QAB
2	Eric Verdonk	New Zealand	6:58.35	R
3	Ihor Mohylniy	Unified Team	7:15.69	R
4	Pertti Karppinen	Finland	7:25.87	R
5	Christian Francis	Lebanon	8:08.47	R

=== Repechage ===
The first two of each heat qualified for the "A/B" semifinals. 3rd–5th placed rowers advanced to the "C/D" (consolation) semifinals.

==== Repechage heat 1 ====
Rank	Rower	Nation	Time	Notes
1	Eric Verdonk	New Zealand	7:02.40	QAB
2	Joaquín Gómez	Mexico	7:02.84	QAB
3	Massimo Marconcini	Italy	7:06.71	QCD
4	Jesús Posse	Uruguay	7:31.32	QCD

==== Repechage heat 2 ====
Rank	Rower	Nation	Time	Notes
1	Kajetan Broniewski	Poland	7:01.64	QAB
2	Xeno Müller	Switzerland	7:04.73	QAB
3	Greg Walker	United States	7:11.85	QCD
4	Christian Francis	Lebanon	8:14.79	QCD

==== Repechage heat 3 ====
Rank	Rower	Nation	Time	Notes
1	Jüri Jaanson	Estonia	7:05.52	QAB
2	Pertti Karppinen	Finland	7:08.82	QAB
3	Frans Göbel	Netherlands	7:09.98	QCD
4	Gábor Mitring	Hungary	7:22.13	QCD
5	Ali Rıza Bilal	Turkey	7:26.03	QCD

==== Repechage heat 4 ====
Rank	Rower	Nation	Time	Notes
1	Konstantinos Kariotis	Greece	7:01.57	QAB
2	Uģis Lasmanis	Latvia	7:03.27	QAB
3	Niall O'Toole	Ireland	7:07.68	QCD
4	Wade Hall-Craggs	Great Britain	7:08.92	QCD
5	Ihor Mohylniy	Unified Team	7:08.92	QCD

=== Semifinals ===
For the Semifinals A/B, the top three of each heat advanced to Final A and 4th–6th placed rowers advanced to Final B.

For the Semifinals C/D, the top three of each heat advanced to Final C and 4th–5th placed rowers advanced to Final D.

==== Semifinal C/D 1 ====
Rank	Rower	Nation	Time	Notes
1	Massimo Marconcini	Italy	7:06.61	QC
2	Frans Göbel	Netherlands	7:09.72	QC
3	Wade Hall-Craggs	Great Britain	7:09.94	QC
4	Ali Rıza Bilal	Turkey	7:10.22	QD
5	Christian Francis	Lebanon	8:12.79	QD

==== Semifinal C/D 2 ====
Rank	Rower	Nation	Time	Notes
1	Ihor Mohylniy	Unified Team	7:03.91	QC
2	Gábor Mitring	Hungary	7:05.04	QC
3	Jesús Posse	Uruguay	7:05.53	QC
4	Greg Walker	United States	7:05.54	QD
5	Niall O'Toole	Ireland	9:25.95	QD

==== Semifinal A/B 1 ====
Rank	Rower	Nation	Time	Notes
1	Thomas Lange	Germany	6:54.54	QA
2	Václav Chalupa	Czechoslovakia	6:56.12	QA
3	Kajetan Broniewski	Poland	7:02.65	QA
4	Pertti Karppinen	Finland	7:12.05	QB
5	Konstantinos Kariotis	Greece	7:12.91	QB
6	Joaquín Gómez	Mexico	7:26.84	QB

==== Semifinal A/B 2 ====
Rank	Rower	Nation	Time	Notes
1	Sergio Fernández	Argentina	6:53.40	QA
2	Jüri Jaanson	Estonia	6:55.64	QA
3	Eric Verdonk	New Zealand	6:56.79	QA
4	Xeno Müller	Switzerland	6:57.64	QB
5	Uģis Lasmanis	Latvia	7:10.69	QB
6	Harald Faderbauer	Austria	7:42.85	QB

=== Finals ===
==== Final D ====
Rank	Rower	Nation	Time
19	Greg Walker	United States	7:12.32
20	Ali Rıza Bilal	Turkey	7:35.15
21	Niall O'Toole	Ireland	8:01.78
22	Christian Francis	Lebanon	8:06.14

==== Final C ====
Rank	Rower	Nation	Time
13	Massimo Marconcini	Italy	7:05.36
14	Wade Hall-Craggs	Great Britain	7:09.05
15	Gábor Mitring	Hungary	7:12.65
16	Frans Göbel	Netherlands	7:12.76
17	Ihor Mohylniy	Unified Team	7:14.34
18	Jesús Posse	Uruguay	7:18.27

==== Final B ====
Rank	Rower	Nation	Time
7	Joaquín Gómez	Mexico	6:57.13
8	Harald Faderbauer	Austria	6:58.97
9	Uģis Lasmanis	Latvia	7:01.54
10	Pertti Karppinen	Finland	7:08.15
11	Konstantinos Kariotis	Greece	7:19.47
—	Xeno Müller	Switzerland	DNS

==== Final A ====
Rank	Rower	Nation	Time
1st place, gold medalist(s)	Thomas Lange	Germany	6:51.40
2nd place, silver medalist(s)	Václav Chalupa	Czechoslovakia	6:52.93
3rd place, bronze medalist(s)	Kajetan Broniewski	Poland	6:56.82
4	Eric Verdonk	New Zealand	6:57.45
5	Jüri Jaanson	Estonia	7:12.92
6	Sergio Fernández	Argentina	7:15.53

== Results summary ==
Rank	Rower	Nation	Quarterfinals	Repechage	Semifinals	Finals
1st place, gold medalist(s)	Thomas Lange	Germany	7:08.13	Bye	6:54.54; Semifinals A/B	6:51.40; Final A
2nd place, silver medalist(s)	Václav Chalupa	Czechoslovakia	7:06.01	Bye	6:56.12; Semifinals A/B	6:52.93; Final A
3rd place, bronze medalist(s)	Kajetan Broniewski	Poland	7:11.01	7:01.64	7:02.65; Semifinals A/B	6:56.82; Final A
4	Eric Verdonk	New Zealand	6:58.35	7:02.40	6:56.79; Semifinals A/B	6:57.45; Final A
5	Jüri Jaanson	Estonia	7:00.85	7:05.52	6:55.64; Semifinals A/B	7:12.92; Final A
6	Sergio Fernández	Argentina	6:59.14	Bye	6:53.40; Semifinals A/B	7:15.53; Final A
7	Joaquín Gómez	Mexico	7:08.77	7:02.84	7:26.84; Semifinals A/B	6:57.13; Final B
8	Harald Faderbauer	Austria	6:57.72	Bye	7:42.85; Semifinals A/B	6:58.97; Final B
9	Uģis Lasmanis	Latvia	7:14.61	7:03.27	7:10.69; Semifinals A/B	7:01.54; Final B
10	Pertti Karppinen	Finland	7:25.87	7:08.82	7:12.05; Semifinals A/B	7:08.15; Final B
11	Konstantinos Kariotis	Greece	7:23.00	7:01.57	7:12.91; Semifinals A/B	7:19.47; Final B
12	Xeno Müller	Switzerland	7:06.20	7:04.73	6:57.64; Semifinals A/B	DNS; Final B
13	Massimo Marconcini	Italy	7:17.67	7:06.71	7:06.61; Semifinals C/D	7:05.36; Final C
14	Wade Hall-Craggs	Great Britain	7:11.58	7:08.92	7:09.94; Semifinals C/D	7:09.05; Final C
15	Gábor Mitring	Hungary	7:11.93	7:22.13	7:05.04; Semifinals C/D	7:12.65; Final C
16	Frans Göbel	Netherlands	7:17.75	7:09.98	7:09.72; Semifinals C/D	7:12.76; Final C
17	Ihor Mohylniy	Unified Team	7:15.69	7:08.92	7:03.91; Semifinals C/D	7:14.34; Final C
18	Jesús Posse	Uruguay	7:38.96	7:31.32	7:05.53; Semifinals C/D	7:18.27; Final C
19	Greg Walker	United States	7:13.62	7:11.85	7:05.54; Semifinals C/D	7:12.32; Final D
20	Ali Rıza Bilal	Turkey	DNF	7:26.03	7:10.22; Semifinals C/D	7:35.15; Final D
21	Niall O'Toole	Ireland	7:50.46	7:07.68	9:25.95; Semifinals C/D	8:01.78; Final D
22	Christian Francis	Lebanon	8:08.47	8:14.79	8:12.79; Semifinals C/D	8:06.14; Final D
