= Rowing at the 1991 Mediterranean Games =

Rowing competition

- Location: Athens, Greece

The Rowing Competition at the 1991 Mediterranean Games was held in Athens, Greece, marking a return of the sport to the Mediterranean Games program after a 12-year absence.

== Medalists ==
Event	Gold	Silver	Bronze
Single sculls	Roberto Fusaro (ITA)	Konstantinos Kariotis (GRE)	Yves Lamarque (FRA)
Double sculls	France (FRA); Pascal Dubosquelle; Vincent Lepvraud	Spain (ESP); Melquiades Verduras; José Antonio Rodríguez	Italy (ITA); Rossano Galtarossa; Giovanni Calabrese
Quadruple sculls	Italy (ITA); Gianluca Farina; Massimo Paradiso; Alessandro Corona; Filippo Soffici	France (FRA); Fabrice LeClerc; Jean-Jacques Martigne; Samuel Barathay; Olivier Pons	Spain (ESP); Bruno López; Antonio Marin; Melquiades Verduras; José Antonio Rodríguez
Coxless pairs	France (FRA); Michel Andrieux; Jean-Christophe Rolland	Italy (ITA); Andrea Gavazi; Franco Zucchi	Greece (GRE); Moschos Kontizas; Dimitrios Drouzas
Coxed pairs	Italy (ITA); Carmine Abbagnale; Giuseppe Abbagnale; Giuseppe Di Capua	Spain (ESP); José Ignacio Bugarín; Ibon Urbieta; Gabriel Marco	Greece (GRE); Spyridon Gatos; Angelos Amanatidis; Lambrinos Rizos
Coxless fours	Italy (ITA); Ciro Liguori; Riccardo Moretti; Roberto Blanda; Antonio Maurogiovanni	Spain (ESP); Fernando Climent; Juan Aguirre; José María de Marco; Fernando Molina	France (FRA); Daniel Fauché; Philippe Lot; Bruno Dumay; Laurent Lacasa

== Medal table ==
Rank	Nation	Gold	Silver	Bronze	Total
1	Italy (ITA)	4	1	1	6
2	France (FRA)	2	1	2	5
3	Spain (ESP)	0	3	1	4
4	Greece (GRE)	0	1	2	3
Totals (4 entries)		6	6	6	18
