= Rowing at the 1996 Summer Olympics – Men's double sculls =

Men's double sculls at the Games of the XXVI Olympiad
- Venue: Lake Lanier
- Date: July 21 – July 27, 1996
- Competitors: 39 from 19 nations

Medalists
1st place, gold medalist(s)		Davide Tizzano; Agostino Abbagnale	Italy
2nd place, silver medalist(s)		Kjetil Undset; Steffen Størseth	Norway
3rd place, bronze medalist(s)		Frédéric Kowal; Samuel Barathay	France

Men's double sculls was an event in Rowing at the 1996 Summer Olympics in Atlanta, United States. The event was held at Lake Lanier between July 21 and July 27, 1996.

France, Norway, and Germany had won 11 of the last 12 World Championship medals and were represented at the 1996 Summer Olympics by Frédéric Kowal and Samuel Barathay, Kjetil Undset and Steffen Størseth, and Sebastian Mayer and Roland Opfer respectively. France, represented in part by Barathay, was the 1993 World Champion and 1994 bronze medalist. Norway was the 1994 World Champion and 1993 runner-up and, with its Olympic duo, the 1995 bronze medalist, while Undset was also an Olympic silver medalist from the 1992 quadruple sculls. Germany had been runner-up at the last two editions of the World Championships and a bronze medalist in 1993. The lone exception to the dominance of these three nations was Denmark, who won the 1995 World Championships with Lars Christensen and Martin Haldbo Hansen. Australia, meanwhile, sent one of its defending Olympic champions, Peter Antonie, to Atlanta with a new partner, Jason Day. Antoine was also one half of the winning crew at the 1995 Double Challenge Sculls at the Henley Royal Regatta. Hungary's Zsolt Dani and Gábor Mitring were the 1994 winners of that tournament.

In the opening round, Norway posted the fastest time by nearly five seconds, while the other heats were won by Denmark and the Italian duo of Davide Tizzano and Agostino Abbagnale, both of whom were Olympic champions in the quadruple sculls from 1988. The Hungarians, meanwhile, were eliminated in the repêchage. In the semi-finals it was France who eliminated the Australians with the fastest time in the round, nearly three seconds ahead of its closest competition, while Italy won the other heat. The race in the final was closer, but Italy, Norway, and France were all ahead of the pack and crossed the finish line in that order. Denmark, the reigning World Champions, came in fourth nearly five seconds later.

== Medalists ==
Gold	Silver	Bronze
Italy; Davide Tizzano; Agostino Abbagnale	Norway; Kjetil Undset; Steffen Størseth	France; Frédéric Kowal; Samuel Barathay

== Heats ==
- SA/B denotes qualification to Semifinal A/B.
- R denotes qualification to Repechage.

=== Heat 1 ===
Rank	Rowers	Country	Time	Notes
1	Kjetil Undset, Steffen Størseth	Norway	6:43.35	SA/B
2	Kajetan Broniewski, Adam Korol	Poland	6:48.13	R
3	Peter Antonie, Jason Day	Australia	6:50.15	R
4	Ondrej Hambálek, Ján Žiška	Slovakia	6:55.87	R
5	Lee In-su, Lee Ho	South Korea	7:11.56	R

=== Heat 2 ===
Rank	Rowers	Country	Time	Notes
1	Lars Christensen, Martin Haldbo Hansen	Denmark	6:48.75	SA/B
2	Sebastian Mayer, Roland Opfer	Germany	6:51.41	R
3	Tom Symoens, Björn Hendrickx	Belgium	6:54.80	R
4	Erik Tul, Luka Špik	Slovenia	7:02.48	R
5	Melquiades Verduras, José Antonio Merín	Spain	7:13.99	R

=== Heat 3 ===
James Cracknell was one of the nominated British scullers but he was suffering from tonsillitis; Guy Pooley as backup rower replaced him.

Rank	Rowers	Country	Time	Notes
1	Davide Tizzano, Agostino Abbagnale	Italy	6:48.22	SA/B
2	Uģis Lasmanis, Andris Reinholds	Latvia	6:52.80	R
3	Hrvoje Telišman, Danijel Bajlo	Croatia	6:55.40	R
4	Arnold Jonke, Christoph Zerbst	Austria	6:56.55	R
5	Guy Pooley, Robert Thatcher	Great Britain	7:00.74	R

=== Heat 4 ===
Rank	Rowers	Country	Time	Notes
1	Frédéric Kowal, Samuel Barathay	France	6:44.01	SA/B
2	Michael Forgeron, Todd Hallett	Canada	6:48.03	R
3	Marcelus dos Santos, Dirceu Marinho	Brazil	6:49.92	R
4	Zsolt Dani, Gábor Mitring	Hungary	6:57.63	R

== Repechage ==
- SA/B denotes qualification to Semifinal A/B.
- RR denotes qualification to Rerace

=== Repechage 1 ===
Rank	Rowers	Country	Time	Notes
1	Arnold Jonke, Christoph Zerbst	Austria	6:43.52	SA/B
2	Tom Symoens, Björn Hendrickx	Belgium	6:48.45	SA/B
3	Kajetan Broniewski, Adam Korol	Poland	6:53.21	RR

=== Repechage 2 ===
Rank	Rowers	Country	Time	Notes
1	Sebastian Mayer, Roland Opfer	Germany	6:43.52	SA/B
2	Hrvoje Telišman, Danijel Bajlo	Croatia	6:48.02	SA/B
3	Zsolt Dani, Gábor Mitring	Hungary	6:50.02	RR
4	Lee In-su, Lee Ho	South Korea	7:09.71	RR

=== Repechage 3 ===
Rank	Rowers	Country	Time	Notes
1	Uģis Lasmanis, Andris Reinholds	Latvia	6:51.19	SA/B
2	Ondrej Hambálek, Ján Žiška	Slovakia	6:53.54	SA/B
3	Marcelus dos Santos, Dirceu Marinho	Brazil	6:56.93	RR
4	Melquiades Verduras, José Antonio Merín	Spain	6:59.57	RR

=== Repechage 4 ===
The British replacement rower Pooley also replaced Cracknell in the repechage.

Rank	Rowers	Country	Time	Notes
1	Michael Forgeron, Todd Hallett	Canada	6:51.93	SA/B
2	Peter Antonie, Jason Day	Australia	6:51.98	SA/B
3	Guy Pooley, Robert Thatcher	Great Britain	7:00.81	RR
4	Erik Tul, Luka Špik	Slovenia	7:06.06	RR

== Rerace ==
- FC denotes qualification to Final C
- E denotes eliminated from competition

=== Rerace 1 ===
The British rower Cracknell had by now recovered from his tonsillitis and took over from the replacement rower Pooley.

Rank	Rowers	Country	Time	Notes
1	Zsolt Dani, Gábor Mitring	Hungary	6:47.77	C
2	James Cracknell, Robert Thatcher	Great Britain	6:51.22	C
3	Melquiades Verduras, José Antonio Merín	Spain	6:55.00	E

=== Rerace 2 ===
Rank	Rowers	Country	Time	Notes
1	Kajetan Broniewski, Adam Korol	Poland	6:48.53	C
2	Marcelus dos Santos, Dirceu Marinho	Brazil	6:52.73	C
3	Erik Tul, Luka Špik	Slovenia	6:56.43	C
4	Lee In-su, Lee Ho	South Korea	7:05.08	E

== Semi-finals ==
- F/A denotes qualification to Final A.
- F/B denotes qualification to Final B.

=== Semi-final 1 ===
Rank	Rowers	Country	Time	Notes
1	Davide Tizzano, Agostino Abbagnale	Italy	6:37.39	F/A
2	Kjetil Undset, Steffen Størseth	Norway	6:40.15	F/A
3	Sebastian Mayer, Roland Opfer	Germany	6:42.57	F/A
4	Michael Forgeron, Todd Hallett	Canada	6:46.35	F/B
5	Tom Symoens, Björn Hendrickx	Belgium	6:48.13	F/B
6	Ondrej Hambálek, Ján Žiška	Slovakia	6:55.73	F/B

=== Semi-final 2 ===
Rank	Rowers	Country	Time	Notes
1	Frédéric Kowal, Samuel Barathay	France	6:32.86	F/A
2	Arnold Jonke, Christoph Zerbst	Austria	6:35.76	F/A
3	Lars Christensen, Martin Haldbo Hansen	Denmark	6:37.10	F/A
4	Peter Antonie, Jason Day	Australia	6:39.49	F/B
5	Uģis Lasmanis, Andris Reinholds	Latvia	6:40.68	F/B
6	Hrvoje Telišman, Danijel Bajlo	Croatia	7:03.53	F/B

== Finals ==
=== Final C ===
Rank	Rowers	Country	Time
1	Kajetan Broniewski, Adam Korol	Poland	6:40.62
2	Erik Tul, Luka Špik	Slovenia	6:43.55
3	Marcelus dos Santos, Dirceu Marinho	Brazil	6:47.12
4	Zsolt Dani, Gábor Mitring	Hungary	6:50.90
5	James Cracknell, Robert Thatcher	Great Britain	6:51.41

=== Final B ===
Rank	Rowers	Country	Time
1	Michael Forgeron, Todd Hallett	Canada	6:18.37
2	Peter Antonie, Jason Day	Australia	6:19.25
3	Uģis Lasmanis, Andris Reinholds	Latvia	6:20.82
4	Tom Symoens, Björn Hendrickx	Belgium	6:21.89
5	Ondrej Hambálek, Ján Žiška	Slovakia	6:26.51
6	Hrvoje Telišman, Danijel Bajlo	Croatia	6:26.84

=== Final A ===
Rank	Rowers	Country	Time
1	Davide Tizzano, Agostino Abbagnale	Italy	6:16.68
2	Kjetil Undset, Steffen Størseth	Norway	6:18.42
3	Frédéric Kowal, Samuel Barathay	France	6:19.85
4	Lars Christensen, Martin Haldbo Hansen	Denmark	6:24.77
5	Arnold Jonke, Christoph Zerbst	Austria	6:25.17
6	Sebastian Mayer, Roland Opfer	Germany	6:29.32
