= Austria at the 1992 Summer Olympics =

- IOC code: AUT
- NOC: Austrian Olympic Committee

in Barcelona, Spain 25 July – 9 August
- Competitors: 102 (71 men and 31 women) in 17 sports
- Flag bearer: Elisabeth Max-Theurer
- Medals Ranked 41st: Gold 0 Silver 2 Bronze 0 Total 2

Summer Olympics appearances (overview)
- 1896; 1900; 1904; 1908; 1912; 1920; 1924; 1928; 1932; 1936; 1948; 1952; 1956; 1960; 1964; 1968; 1972; 1976; 1980; 1984; 1988; 1992; 1996; 2000; 2004; 2008; 2012; 2016; 2020; 2024

Other related appearances
- 1906 Intercalated Games

Austria competed at the 1992 Summer Olympics in Barcelona, Spain. 102 competitors, 71 men and 31 women, took part in 68 events in 17 sports.

== Medalists ==
Medal	Name	Sport	Event	Date
Silver	Arnold Jonke; Christoph Zerbst	Rowing	Men's double sculls	1 August
Silver	Boris Boor; Thomas Frühmann; Jörg Münzner; Hugo Simon	Equestrian	Team jumping	4 August

== Competitors ==
The following is the list of number of competitors in the Games.

Sport	Men	Women	Total
Athletics	11	5	16
Badminton	2	0	2
Canoeing	3	1	4
Cycling	5	0	5
Diving	2	0	2
Equestrian	4	1	5
Fencing	5	0	5
Handball	0	14	14
Judo	3	3	6
Rowing	12	0	12
Sailing	13	0	13
Shooting	4	1	5
Swimming	1	1	2
Synchronized swimming	–	2	2
Table tennis	2	0	2
Tennis	2	3	5
Wrestling	2	–	2
Total	71	31	102

== Athletics ==
Men's 100m metres

- Andreas Berger
  - Heat — DSQ (→ did not advance)

Men's Marathon

- Helmut Schmuck — 2:23.38 (→ 47th place)

Men's 50 km Walk

- Stefan Wogerbauer — 4:17:25 (→ 26th place)

Men's Hammer Throw

- Johann Linder
  - Qualification — 75.28 m
  - Final — 75.14 m (→ 9th place)

Men's Shot Put

- Klaus Bodenmuller
  - Qualification — 19.86 m
  - Final — 20.48 m (→ 6th place)

Women's High Jump

- Sigrid Kirchmann
  - Qualification — 1.92 m
  - Final — 1.94 m (→ 5th place)

Women's Long Jump

- Ljudmila Ninova-Rudoll
  - Heat — 6.53 m (→ did not advance)

Women's Discus Throw

- Ursula Weber
  - Heat — 51.62m (→ did not advance)

== Cycling ==
Five cyclists, all men, represented Austria in 1992.

Men's road race

- Peter Luttenberger
- Andreas Langl
- Georg Totschnig

Men's 1 km time trial

- Christian Meidlinger

Men's points race

- Franz Stocher

== Diving ==
Men's 3m Springboard

- Niki Stajković
  - Preliminary round – 339.75 points (→ did not advance, 22nd place)
- Jürgen Richter
  - Preliminary round – 336.78 points (→ did not advance, 24th place)

== Fencing ==
Men's foil

- Benny Wendt
- Anatol Richter
- Michael Ludwig

Men's team foil

- Benny Wendt, Anatol Richter, Michael Ludwig, Robert Blaschka, Merten Mauritz

== Handball ==
=== Women's team competition ===
- Preliminary round (Group B)
  - Austria – Spain 20-16
  - Austria – South Korea 27-27
  - Austria – Norway 17-19
- Classification Match
  - 5th/6th place: Austria – United States 26-17 (→ Fifth place)
- Team Roster
  - Stanka Bozovic
  - Slavica Đukić
  - Jadranka Jez
  - Kerstin Jönsson
  - Leona Kloud
  - Jasna Kolar-Merdan
  - Sandra Mamoli
  - Edith Matei
  - Iris Morhammer
  - Nicole Peissl
  - Karin Prokop
  - Marianna Racz
  - Natali Rusnatchenko
  - Barbara Strass
  - Liliana Topea
  - Teresa Zurowski
- Head coach: Vinco Kandija

== Rowing ==
Austria was represented by 12 male rowers.

Men's single sculls

- Harald Faderbauer (8th)

Men's double sculls

- Arnold Jonke, Christoph Zerbst ( Silver)

Men's coxless pairs

- Karl Sinzinger, Jr., Hermann Bauer (12th)

Men's quadruple sculls

- Günther Schuster, Walter Kaiser, Gert Port, Horst Nußbaumer (14th)

Coxed Pairs

- Volkmar Kuttelwascher, Dietmar Kuttelwascher, Markus Irle (10th)

== Sailing ==
Men

Athlete	Event	Race										Net points	Final rank
Athlete	Event	1	2	3	4	5	6	7	8	9	10	Net points	Final rank
Christoph Sieber	Lechner A-390	18	8	2	6	2	12	6	~~27~~	3	13	110.1	5
Hans Spitzauer	Finn	9	~~18~~	5	15	3	3	16	—N/a			79.4	8
Christian Binder; Markus Piso	470	4	20	24	~~31~~	25	23	23	—N/a			153.0	26

Open

Athlete	Event	Race							Net points	Final rank
Athlete	Event	1	2	3	4	5	6	7	Net points	Final rank
Stephan Schurich; Markus Schneeberger	Flying Dutchman	7	~~19~~	18	11	8	8	21	107.0	16
Andreas Hagara; Roman Hagara	Tornado	6	6	1	~~18~~	4	13	9	65.4	7
Hubert Raudaschl; Friedrich Xaver Gruber	Star	15	18	18	11	11	14	~~22~~	123.0	20
Michael Luschan; Stefan Lindner; Georg Stadler	Soling	9	15	17	9	18	~~19~~	—N/a	98.0	19

== Shooting ==
Men

Athlete	Event	Qualification		Final	
Athlete	Event	Score	Rank	Score	Rank
Thomas Farnik	50 m rifle three positions	1160	14	did not advance	
Thomas Farnik	10 m air rifle	590	6 Q	690.2	6
Wolfram Waibel Sr.	50 m rifle prone	591	31	did not advance	
Wolfram Waibel Jr.	50 m rifle three positions	1140	38	did not advance	
Wolfram Waibel Jr.	50 m rifle prone	596	11	did not advance	
Wolfram Waibel Jr.	10 m air rifle	589	11	did not advance	

Women

Athlete	Event	Qualification		Final	
Athlete	Event	Score	Rank	Score	Rank
Jana Kubala	50 m rifle three positions	575	14	did not advance	
Jana Kubala	10 m air rifle	378	12	did not advance	

Open

Athlete	Event	Qualification		Final	
Athlete	Event	Score	Rank	Score	Rank
Josef Hahnenkamp	Skeet	144	33	did not advance	

== Swimming ==
Men's 100m Butterfly

- Alexander Brandl
  - Heat – 55.45 (→ did not advance, 26th place)

Men's 200m Butterfly

- Alexander Brandl
  - Heat – 2:02.88 (→ did not advance, 32nd place)

Women's 100m Breaststroke

- Martina Nemec
  - Heat – 1:13.34 (→ did not advance, 25th place)

Women's 200m Breaststroke

- Martina Nemec
  - Heat – 2:36.65 (→ did not advance, 25th place)

Women's 200m Individual Medley

- Martina Nemec
  - Heat – 2:22.63 (→ did not advance, 27th place)

== Synchronized swimming ==
Two synchronized swimmers represented Austria in 1992.

Women's solo

- Beatrix Müllner
- Christine Müllner

Women's duet

- Beatrix Müllner
- Christine Müllner

== Tennis ==
Men's singles competition

- Thomas Muster
  1. First round — Lost to Henri Leconte (France) 6–7, 6–7, 4–6
- Horst Skoff
  1. First round — Lost to Magnus Larsson (Sweden) 2–6, 2–6, 3–6

Women's singles competition

- Barbara Paulus
  1. First round – Defeated Monique Javer (Great Britain) 6–7, 6–4, 6–3
  2. Second round – Lost to Anke Huber (Germany) 4–6, 1-6
- Petra Ritter
  1. First round – Lost to Eugenia Maniokova (Unified Team) 1–6, 6-7
