= Rowing at the 1996 Summer Olympics – Men's single sculls =

Olympic rowing event

Men's single sculls at the Games of the XXVI Olympiad
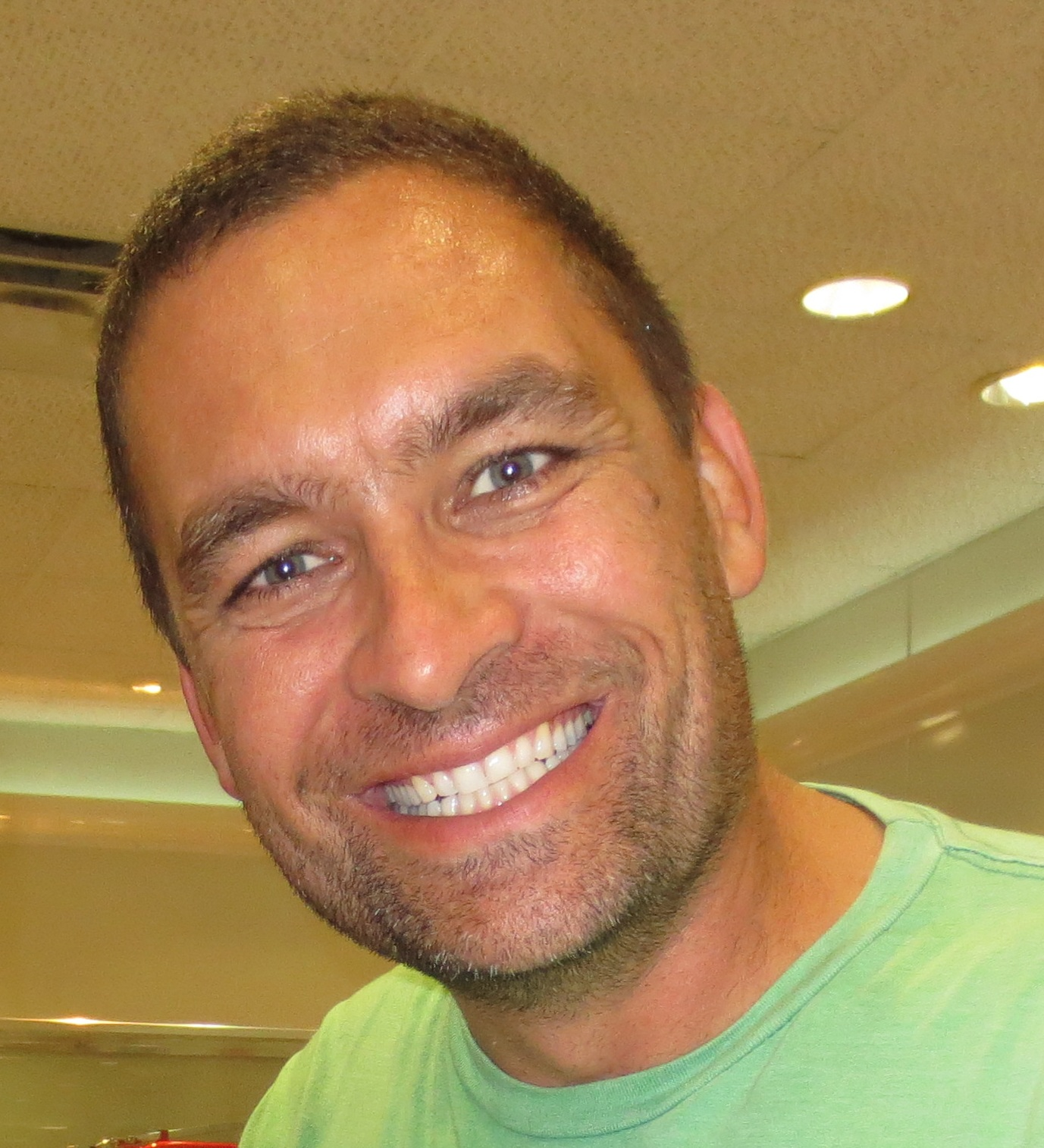
- Gold medalist Xeno Müller (2012)
- Venue: Lake Lanier
- Date: 21–27 July
- Competitors: 21 from 21 nations
- Winning time: 6:44.85

Medalists
1st place, gold medalist(s)		Xeno Müller; Switzerland
2nd place, silver medalist(s)		Derek Porter; Canada
3rd place, bronze medalist(s)		Thomas Lange; Germany

The men's single sculls competition at the 1996 Summer Olympics took place at Lake Lanier, Atlanta, United States of America. The event was held from 21 to 27 July 1996. There were 21 competitors from 21 nations, with each nation limited to a single boat in the event. The event was won by Xeno Müller of Switzerland, the nation's first victory in the event and first medal of any color since 1960. Derek Porter's silver was Canada's best-ever result in the event, over bronze medals in 1912 and 1984. Two-time defending champion Thomas Lange of Germany settled with a bronze medal this time, becoming the fourth man to win three medals in the event.

== Background ==
This was the 22nd appearance of the event. Rowing had been on the programme in 1896 but was cancelled due to bad weather. The single sculls has been held every time that rowing has been contested, beginning in 1900.

Five of the 22 single scullers from the 1992 Games returned: two-time gold medalist Thomas Lange of Germany, silver medalist Václav Chalupa of Czechoslovakia (now representing the Czech Republic), fifth-place finisher Jüri Jaanson of Estonia, sixth-place finisher Sergio Fernández González of Argentina, and thirteenth-place finisher Massimo Marconcini of Italy. The field was strong with no clear favorite. There were four World Champions competing in Atlanta: Lange (1987 and 1989), Jaanson (1990), Derek Porter of Canada (1993), and Iztok Čop of Slovenia (reigning, 1995). Chalupa was a four-time World silver medalist along with his 1992 Olympic silver. Fernández González was the reigning Pan American champion. Lange, Xeno Müller of Switzerland, and Jaanson had won the Diamond Challenge Sculls in 1993, 1994, and 1995, respectively.

The Czech Republic, Hong Kong, Russia, Slovenia, and Ukraine each made their debut in the event. The United States made its 18th appearance, most among nations.

== Competition format ==
This rowing event was a single scull event, meaning that each boat was propelled by a single rower. The "scull" portion means that the rower used two oars, one on each side of the boat. The course used the 2000 metres distance that became the Olympic standard in 1912.

The tournament used the four-round format (three main rounds and a repechage) that had been used since 1968. The competition continued to use the six-boat heat standardized in 1960. The use of multiple classes of semifinals and finals to rank every boat, introduced in 1992, continued as well.

- Quarterfinals: Four heats of 5 or 6 boats each. The top boat in each heat (4 total) advanced directly to the "A/B" semifinals. The remaining boats (17 total) went to the repechage.
- Repechage: Four heats of 4 or 5 boats each. The top two boats in each heat (8 total) rejoined the quarterfinal winners in the "A/B" semifinals. The other boats (9 total) went to the "C/D" semifinals, where they were no longer competing for medals.
- Semifinals: Four semifinals. Two "A/B" semifinals of 6 boats each for boats still in contention for medals; the top three boats in each heat (6 total) advanced to Final A, the remaining boats (6 total) went to Final B. Two "C/D" semifinals were used to sort remaining boats into ranking finals with no chance of medals; the top three boats in each heat (6 total) went to Final C while the remaining boats (3 total) went to Final D.
- Final: Four finals. Final A consisted of the top 6 boats. Final B placed boats 7 through 12. Final C placed boats 13 through 18. Final D placed boats 19 through 21.

== Schedule ==
All times are Eastern Daylight Time (UTC-4)

Date	Time	Round
Sunday, 21 July 1996	12:10	Quarterfinals
Tuesday, 23 July 1996	11:10	Repechage
Thursday, 25 July 1996	11:20	Semifinals
Friday, 26 July 1996	11:10	Finals C and D
Saturday, 27 July 1996	9:42; 12:00	Final B Final A

== Results ==
=== Quarterfinals ===
The winner in each heat advanced directly to Semifinals A/B. The remaining rowers competed in the repechage for the remaining spots in the semifinals.

==== Quarterfinal 1 ====
Rank	Rower	Nation	Time	Notes
1	Xeno Müller	Switzerland	7:26.75	QAB
2	Iztok Čop	Slovenia	7:32.69	R
3	Horst Nußbaumer	Austria	7:36.15	R
4	Giovanni Calabrese	Italy	7:39.90	R
5	Anton Sema	Russia	7:49.94	R
6	Daisaku Takeda	Japan	7:56.93	R

==== Quarterfinal 2 ====
Rank	Rower	Nation	Time	Notes
1	Derek Porter	Canada	7:31.75	QAB
2	László Szögi	Hungary	7:39.31	R
3	David Cameron	Australia	7:53.55	R
4	Oleksandr Khimich	Ukraine	7:57.05	R
5	Michael Tse	Hong Kong	8:11.51	R

==== Quarterfinal 3 ====
Rank	Rower	Nation	Time	Notes
1	Thomas Lange	Germany	7:34.52	QAB
2	Sergio Fernandez	Argentina	7:37.53	R
3	Ali Ibrahim	Egypt	7:41.17	R
4	Peter Haining	Great Britain	7:42.65	R
5	Jüri Jaanson	Estonia	8:10.01	R

==== Quarterfinal 4 ====
Rank	Rower	Nation	Time	Notes
1	Václav Chalupa	Czech Republic	7:35.48	QAB
2	Fredrik Bekken	Norway	7:39.36	R
3	Cyrus Beasley	United States	7:44.79	R
4	Rob Waddell	New Zealand	7:48.69	R
5	Tomas Söderblom	Finland	7:53.46	R

=== Repechage ===
The first two rowers in each race advanced to Semifinals A/B, the rest went to Semifinals C/D.

==== Repechage heat 1 ====
Rank	Rower	Nation	Time	Notes
1	Iztok Čop	Slovenia	7:41.83	QAB
2	Peter Haining	Great Britain	7:45.95	QAB
3	David Cameron	Australia	7:49.24	QCD
4	Tomas Soderblom	Finland	7:52.52	QCD
5	Daisaku Takeda	Japan	7:59.77	QCD

==== Repechage heat 2 ====
Rank	Rower	Nation	Time	Notes
1	Rob Waddell	New Zealand	7:42.87	QAB
2	Ali Ibrahim	Egypt	7:45.64	QAB
3	Laszlo Szogi	Hungary	7:53.04	QCD
4	Anton Sema	Russia	8:46.71	QCD

==== Repechage heat 3 ====
Rank	Rower	Nation	Time	Notes
1	Sergio Fernandez	Argentina	7:42.63	QAB
2	Cyrus Beasley	United States	7:44.36	QAB
3	Giovanni Calabrese	Italy	7:39.90	QCD
4	Michael Tse	Hong Kong	8:31.41	QCD

==== Repechage heat 4 ====
Rank	Rower	Nation	Time	Notes
1	Fredrik Bekken	Norway	7:47.31	QAB
2	Horst Nußbaumer	Austria	7:49.79	QAB
3	Oleksandr Khimich	Ukraine	7:56.15	QCD
4	Jüri Jaanson	Estonia	8:15.25	QCD

=== Semifinals ===
Rowers competing in Semifinals A/B were the rowers who still have chance to win medal in Final A. The first three rowers from each semifinal advanced to Final A, while the others advanced to Final B. On the other hand, rowers competing in Semifinals C/D were the rowers who were already eliminated from the medal race. The first three rowers from these semifinals advanced to Final C and the others to Final D.

==== Semifinal C/D 1 ====
Rank	Rower	Nation	Time	Notes
1	David Cameron	Australia	7:25.38	QC
2	Laszlo Szogi	Hungary	7:27.92	QC
3	Jüri Jaanson	Estonia	7:28.89	QC
4	Daisaku Takeda	Japan	7:32.63	QD
5	Michael Tse	Hong Kong	7:51.15	QD

==== Semifinal C/D 2 ====
Rank	Rower	Nation	Time	Notes
1	Giovanni Calabrese	Italy	7:23.59	QC
2	Tomas Soderblom	Finland	7:23.88	QC
3	Anton Sema	Russia	7:28.44	QC
4	Oleksandr Khimich	Ukraine	7:31.24	QD

==== Semifinal A/B 1 ====
Rank	Rower	Nation	Time	Notes
1	Xeno Müller	Switzerland	7:10.07	QA
2	Derek Porter	Canada	7:14.91	QA
3	Fredrik Bekken	Norway	7:19.92	QA
4	Ali Ibrahim	Egypt	7:22.43	QB
5	Sergio Fernandez	Argentina	7:23.70	QB
6	Peter Haining	Great Britain	7:30.47	QB

==== Semifinal A/B 2 ====
Rank	Rower	Nation	Time	Notes
1	Thomas Lange	Germany	7:12.30	QA
2	Iztok Čop	Slovenia	7:15.07	QA
3	Václav Chalupa	Czech Republic	7:16.97	QA
4	Rob Waddell	New Zealand	7:18.52	QB
5	Cyrus Beasley	United States	7:31.49	QB
6	Horst Nußbaumer	Austria	7:35.52	QB

=== Finals ===
==== Final D ====
Rank	Rower	Nation	Time
19	Oleksandr Khimich	Ukraine	7:40.54
20	Daisaku Takeda	Japan	7:45.23
21	Michael Tse	Hong Kong	8:06.43

==== Final C ====
Rank	Rower	Nation	Time
13	David Cameron	Australia	7:30.55
14	Tomas Soderblom	Finland	7:32.98
15	Laszlo Szogi	Hungary	7:34.23
16	Anton Sema	Russia	7:44.93
17	Giovanni Calabrese	Italy	7:48.63
18	Jüri Jaanson	Estonia	8:33.53

==== Final B ====
Rank	Rower	Nation	Time
7	Rob Waddell	New Zealand	6:49.55
8	Ali Ibrahim	Egypt	6:52.11
9	Horst Nußbaumer	Austria	6:53.20
10	Cyrus Beasley	United States	6:54.17
11	Peter Haining	Great Britain	6:55.06
12	Sergio Fernandez	Argentina	6:56.97

==== Final A ====
Rank	Rower	Nation	Time
1st place, gold medalist(s)	Xeno Müller	Switzerland	6:44.85
2nd place, silver medalist(s)	Derek Porter	Canada	6:47.45
3rd place, bronze medalist(s)	Thomas Lange	Germany	6:47.72
4	Iztok Čop	Slovenia	6:51.71
5	Václav Chalupa	Czech Republic	6:55.65
6	Fredrik Bekken	Norway	6:59.51

== Results summary ==
Rank	Rower	Nation	Quarterfinals	Repechage	Semifinals	Finals
1st place, gold medalist(s)	Xeno Müller	Switzerland	7:26.75	Bye	7:10.07; Semifinals A/B	6:44.85; Final A
2nd place, silver medalist(s)	Derek Porter	Canada	7:31.75	Bye	7:14.91; Semifinals A/B	6:47.45; Final A
3rd place, bronze medalist(s)	Thomas Lange	Germany	7:34.52	Bye	7:12.30; Semifinals A/B	6:47.72; Final A
4	Iztok Čop	Slovenia	7:32.69	7:41.83	7:15.07; Semifinals A/B	6:51.71; Final A
5	Václav Chalupa	Czech Republic	7:35.48	Bye	7:16.97; Semifinals A/B	6:55.65; Final A
6	Fredrik Bekken	Norway	7:39.36	7:47.31	7:19.92; Semifinals A/B	6:59.51; Final A
7	Rob Waddell	New Zealand	7:48.69	7:42.87	7:18.52; Semifinals A/B	6:49.55; Final B
8	Ali Ibrahim	Egypt	7:41.17	7:45.64	7:22.43; Semifinals A/B	6:52.11; Final B
9	Horst Nußbaumer	Austria	7:36.15	7:49.79	7:35.52; Semifinals A/B	6:53.20; Final B
10	Cyrus Beasley	United States	7:44.79	7:44.36	7:31.49; Semifinals A/B	6:54.17; Final B
11	Peter Haining	Great Britain	7:42.65	7:45.95	7:30.47; Semifinals A/B	6:55.06; Final B
12	Sergio Fernandez	Argentina	7:37.53	7:42.63	7:23.70; Semifinals A/B	6:56.97; Final B
13	David Cameron	Australia	7:53.55	7:49.24	7:25.38; Semifinals C/D	7:30.55; Final C
14	Tomas Soderblom	Finland	7:53.46	7:52.52	7:23.88; Semifinals C/D	7:32.98; Final C
15	Laszlo Szogi	Hungary	7:39.31	7:53.04	7:27.92; Semifinals C/D	7:34.23; Final C
16	Anton Sema	Russia	7:49.94	8:46.71	7:28.44; Semifinals C/D	7:44.93; Final C
17	Giovanni Calabrese	Italy	7:39.90	7:39.90	7:23.59; Semifinals C/D	7:48.63; Final C
18	Jüri Jaanson	Estonia	8:10.01	8:15.25	7:28.89; Semifinals C/D	8:33.53; Final C
19	Oleksandr Khimich	Ukraine	7:57.05	7:56.15	7:31.24; Semifinals C/D	7:40.54; Final D
20	Daisaku Takeda	Japan	7:56.93	7:59.77	7:32.63; Semifinals C/D	7:45.23; Final D
21	Michael Tse	Hong Kong	8:11.51	8:31.41	7:51.15; Semifinals C/D	8:06.43; Final D
