= Yves Lamarque =

French rower (born 1967)

Personal information
- Born: 30 November 1967 (age 58) Dax, Landes, France

Sport
- Sport: Rowing
Medal record
Men's rowing
Representing France
World Rowing Championships
Gold medal – first place	1993 Račice	Double sculls
Bronze medal – third place	1994 Indianapolis	Double sculls

Yves Lamarque (born 30 November 1967) is a French rower.

Lamarque was born in Dax, Landes, France, in 1967. He competed at the 1992 Summer Olympics in Barcelona in quadruple sculls partnered with Fiorenzo Di Giovanni, Fabrice LeClerc, and Samuel Barathay where they came sixth. He won a gold medal at the 1993 World Rowing Championships in Račice partnered with Barathay in the men's double sculls. He competed at the 1996 Summer Olympics in Atlanta, again in quadruple sculls, this time partnered with Vincent Lepvraud, Sébastien Vieilledent, and LeClerc where they came twelfth.
