= Vilks =

Origin
- Origin: Latvian
- Meaning: "wolf"

Vilks (feminine: Vilka) is a Latvian surname, derived from the Latvian word for "wolf". Individuals with the surname include:

- Andris Vilks (born 1963), Latvian politician
- Girts Vilks (born 1968), Soviet rower
- Lars Vilks (1946–2021), Swedish artist
