= Osterlund =

Österlund is a Swedish surname, written abroad also as Osterlund. Notable people with the surname include:

- John Österlund (1875–1953), Swedish artist and curator
- Rod Osterlund, American NASCAR team owner
- Tommy Österlund (born 1966), Swedish rower
