= Ruckstuhl =

Ruckstuhl is a surname. Notable people with the name include:

- Alphonse Ruckstuhl (1901–date of death unknown), Swiss fencer
- Friedrich Ruckstuhl (1853–1942), French-born American sculptor and art critic
- Géraldine Ruckstuhl (born 1998), Swiss heptathlete
- Karin Ruckstuhl (born 1980), Dutch heptathlete
- Lotti Ruckstuhl (1901–1988), Swiss lawyer and suffragist

== See also ==
- Alexander Rückstuhl (born 1971), Swiss rower
