= Walter Kaiser =

Walter Kaiser may refer to:

- Walter Kaiser (footballer), German footballer
- Walter Kaiser Jr., (born 1933), American evangelical Old Testament scholar, writer, public speaker, and educator
- Walter Kaiser (rower) (born 1971), Austrian Olympic rower
- Walter J. Kaiser (1931–2016), American professor of English literature
