= Chupryna =

Chupryna may refer to:

- Phonetic transliteration of "Czupryna" a Polish and Ukrainian haircut
- Mykola Chupryna, Ukrainian rower
- Oleksa Chupryna-Chekhivskyi, Ukrainian singer and choir conductor
