= Lars Christensen (disambiguation) =

Lars Christensen (1884–1965) was a Norwegian shipowner and whaling magnate.

Lars Christensen may also refer to:

- Lars Christensen (born 1965), Danish rower
- Lars Ankerstjerne Christensen (born 1984), Danish rapper known as Ankerstjerne
- Lars Lindberg Christensen (born 1970), Danish science communicator
- Lars Saabye Christensen (born 1953), Norwegian author
