= Eric Verdonk =

New Zealand rower (1959–2020)

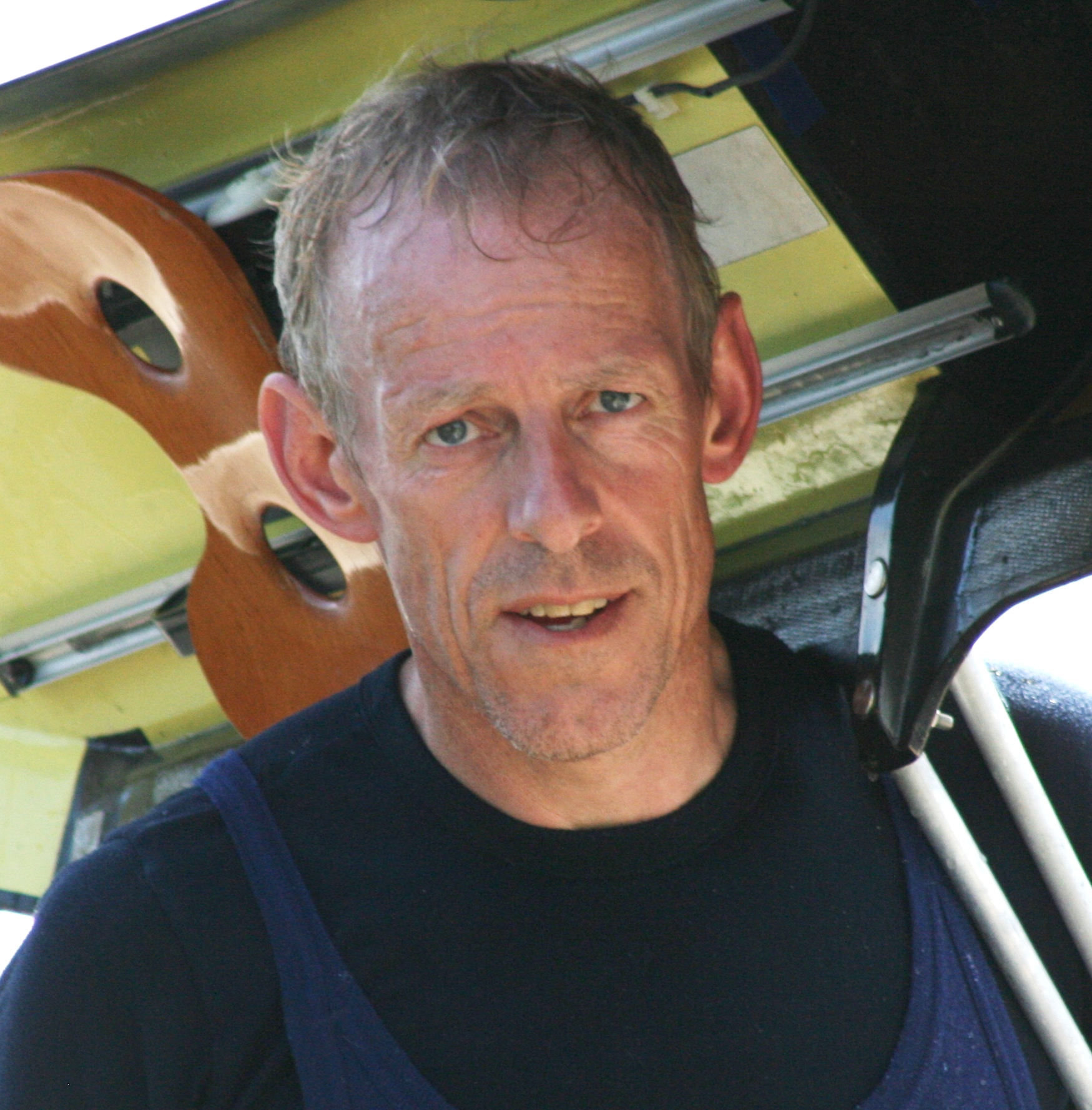
- Verdonk in 2009

Personal information
- Full name: Eric Franciscus Maria Verdonk
- Born: 28 May 1959 Taihape, New Zealand
- Died: 3 April 2020 (aged 60) Auckland, New Zealand
- Height: 189 cm (6 ft 2 in)
- Weight: 85 kg (187 lb)

Sport
- Sport: Rowing
Medal record
Representing New Zealand
Men's rowing
Olympic Games
Bronze medal – third place	1988 Seoul	Single Sculls
Commonwealth Games
Bronze medal – third place	1986 Edinburgh	Single Sculls
World Rowing Championships
Bronze medal – third place	1990 Tasmania	Single Sculls

Eric Franciscus Maria Verdonk (28 May 1959 – 3 April 2020) was a New Zealand rower who won bronze medals in the single sculls events at the 1988 Summer Olympics, 1986 Commonwealth Games, and 1990 World Rowing Championships.

== Career ==
Verdonk began rowing at Westlake Boys High School in Forrest Hill, Auckland. In 1976, he won the Maadi Cup. He was a member of the North Shore Rowing Club, joining the club in 1973.

At the 1986 Commonwealth Games in Edinburgh, Verdonk won a bronze medal in the single sculls; the race was won by Steve Redgrave. He also came fourth in the double sculls event at the Games. At the 1988 Summer Olympics in Seoul, Verdonk competed in the single sculls. He won his heat, came third in his semi-final, and finished third in the final behind Thomas Lange and Peter-Michael Kolbe. At the 1992 Summer Olympics in Barcelona, Verdonk finished fourth, and at one point in the race was 0.62 seconds behind Pole Kajetan Broniewski, who finished third.

In total, he competed at five World Rowing Championships, and his best result was third, at the 1990 in Tasmania, Australia. Verdonk was sixth in the single sculls at the 1987 World Rowing Championships in Copenhagen, and was fifth in the single sculls at the 1991 World Rowing Championships in Vienna.

In 1994, Verdonk won the double sculls event at the Commonwealth Championships in Ontario, Canada, and finished second in the quad scull event. Verdonk also won the Diamond Challenge Sculls (the premier singles sculls event) at the Henley Royal Regatta, becoming the first New Zealander to win the event. Another year, Verdonk came second in the single sculls event at the Henley Royal Regatta. He won seven consecutive New Zealand single skulls national championships between 1987 and 1993. He won six New Zealand double skulls national championships, with four different partners.

Following his retirement, Verdonk worked for Waitakere Sports Association, and from 2017, Verdonk was the head coach at Takapuna Grammar School Rowing Club In March 2020, the club made him a lifetime member. Also in 2020, the New Zealand Rowing Foundation awarded Verdonk a legacy medal for his contributions to rowing in New Zealand.

== Personal life and death ==
Verdonk was born in Taihape, New Zealand, to Dutch parents, and his native language was Dutch. He was married and had a son and a daughter.

Verdonk died of cancer on 3 April 2020 in Auckland, at the age of 60.
