= Lee Ho =

Lee Ho (Korean: 이호) may refer to:

- Injong of Joseon (1515–1545), Korean king of the Joseon Dynasty
- Hyojong of Joseon (1619–1659), Korean king of the Joseon Dynasty
- Lee Ho (volleyball) (born 1973), South Korean volleyball player
- Lee Ho (footballer, born 1984), South Korean football player
- Lee Ho (footballer, born 1986), South Korean football player
- Lee Ho (rower) (born 1976), South Korean Olympic rower
