= Khimich =

Khimich is a surname. Notable people with the surname include:

- Andrey Khimich (born 1937), Soviet Ukraianian sprint canoer
- Oleksandr Khimich (born 1975), Ukrainian rower
- Tamila Khimich (born 1994), Ukrainian footballer
- Yuriy Khimich (1928–2003), Soviet Ukrainian architect and artist
