= Ondrej Hambálek =

Slovak rower

Personal information
- Nationality: Slovak
- Born: 13 September 1973 (age 51); Bratislava, Slovakia

Sport
- Sport: Rowing

Ondrej Hambálek (born 13 September 1973) is a Slovak rower. He competed in the men's double sculls event at the 1996 Summer Olympics.
