= Frédéric Kowal =

French rower

Medal record

Men's rowing

Representing France

Olympic Games
Bronze medal – third place	1996 Atlanta	Double sculls

Frédéric Kowal (born 2 October 1970 in Nogent-sur-Seine) is a French rower.
