= László Szögi =

Hungarian rower

Personal information
- Nationality: Hungarian
- Born: 20 June 1972 (age 52); Szeged, Hungary

Sport
- Sport: Rowing

László Szögi (born 20 June 1972) is a Hungarian rower. He competed in the men's single sculls event at the 1996 Summer Olympics.
