= Greg Walker (rower) =

American rower

Personal information
- Full name: Gregory Alan Walker
- Born: February 18, 1964 (age 62) Mount Clemens, Michigan, United States
- Education: Wayne State University
- Height: 185 cm (6 ft 1 in)
- Weight: 84 kg (185 lb)

Sport
- Sport: Rowing
- University team: Wayne State Warriors
- Club: Detroit Boat Club
Medal record
Men's rowing
Representing the United States
Pan American Games
Gold medal – first place	1987 Indianapolis	Double sculls

Gregory Alan Walker (born February 18, 1964) is an American rower. He competed in the men's single sculls event at the 1992 Summer Olympics.
