= Erik Tul =

Slovenian rower

Personal information
- Nationality: Slovenian
- Born: 1 August 1975 (age 49); Izola, Yugoslavia

Sport
- Sport: Rowing

Erik Tul (born 1 August 1975) is a Slovenian rower. He competed in the men's double sculls event at the 1996 Summer Olympics.
