= Jarosław Janowski =

Polish rower

Personal information
- Nationality: Polish
- Born: 2 April 1967 (age 57); Więcbork, Poland

Sport
- Sport: Rowing

Jarosław Janowski (born 2 April 1967) is a Polish rower. He competed in the men's quadruple sculls event at the 1992 Summer Olympics.
