= Martin Haldbo Hansen =

Danish rower

Medal record

Men's rowing

Representing Denmark

World Rowing Championships
Gold medal – first place	1995 Tampere	M2x

Martin Haldbo Hansen (born 2 February 1969 in Frederikssund) is a Danish rower. Together with Lars Christensen he finished fourth in the double sculls at the 1996 Olympics.
