= Danijel Bajlo =

Croatian rower

Personal information
- Nationality: Croatian
- Born: 29 June 1973 (age 51); Zadar, Yugoslavia

Sport
- Sport: Rowing

Danijel Bajlo (born 29 June 1973) is a Croatian rower. He competed in the men's double sculls event at the 1996 Summer Olympics.
