= Marc-Sven Nater =

Swiss rower

Medal record

Men's rowing

Representing Switzerland

World Rowing Championships
Silver medal – second place	1990 Tasmania	M4x

Marc-Sven Nater (born 21 March 1965) is a Swiss rower. He finished 4th in the men's quadruple sculls at the 1992 Summer Olympics and 2nd at the World Championships 1990. He is a several times Swiss Rowing Champion.

Marc-Sven Nater studied law at the University of Zurich (Dr.iur., 1992/1999) and at the University of Virginia (UVA), School of Law (LL.M., 1999). Marc-Sven Nater is a member of the Zurich and Swiss Bar Association (President of Zurich Bar Association 2017/2018).
