= Dirceu Marinho =

Brazilian rower

Personal information
- Born: 23 November 1970 (age 55) Rio de Janeiro, Brazil

Sport
- Sport: Rowing
Medal record
Representing Brazil
Pan American Games
Silver medal – second place	1995 Mar del Plata	Double sculls

Dirceu Antônio Marinho (born 23 November 1970) is a Brazilian rower. He competed in the men's double sculls event at the 1996 Summer Olympics.
