= Robin Bakker =

Australian rower

Personal information
- Nationality: Australian
- Born: 4 December 1959 (age 65)

Sport
- Sport: Rowing

Robin Bakker (born 4 December 1959) is an Australian rower. He competed in the men's quadruple sculls event at the 1992 Summer Olympics.
