= Marek Gawkowski =

Polish rower

Personal information
- Nationality: Polish
- Born: 15 May 1965 (age 60); Szczecin, Poland

Sport
- Sport: Rowing

Marek Gawkowski (born 15 May 1965) is a Polish rower. He competed in the men's quadruple sculls event at the 1992 Summer Olympics.
