= Hrvoje Telišman =

Croatian rower

Personal information
- Nationality: Croatian
- Born: 25 December 1972 (age 52); Zagreb, Yugoslavia

Sport
- Sport: Rowing

Hrvoje Telišman (born 25 December 1972) is a Croatian rower. He competed in the men's double sculls event at the 1996 Summer Olympics.
