= Derek Porter =

Canadian rower

Personal information
- Born: 2 November 1967 (age 58) Belfast, Northern Ireland

Sport
- Sport: Rowing
Medal record
Men's rowing
Representing Canada
Olympic Games
Gold medal – first place	1992 Barcelona	Eight
Silver medal – second place	1996 Atlanta	Single sculls
World Championships
Gold medal – first place	1993 Račice	Single sculls
Silver medal – second place	1990 Tasmania	Eight
Silver medal – second place	1991 Vienna	Eight
Bronze medal – third place	1999 St. Catharines	Single sculls
Pan American Games
Gold medal – first place	1999 Winnipeg	Single sculls
Summer Universiade
Silver medal – second place	1993 Buffalo	Single sculls
Silver medal – second place	1993 Buffalo	Quadruple sculls
Bronze medal – third place	1989 Duisburg	Coxless pairs

Derek Nesbitt-Porter (born 2 November 1967) is a gold medal-winning Olympic rower from Canada.

== Early life and education ==
He was born in Belfast, Northern Ireland, and his father Hugh rowed for England at the 1958 British Empire and Commonwealth Games, winning a bronze medal in the eight-oared race. Porter began his rowing career in his second year at the University of Victoria.

== Athletic career ==
Porter won his gold medal in the 1992 Summer Olympics, stroking the Canadian Men's Eight. In a photo finish, the Canadian boat won by 0.14 seconds, just nipping Romania, with two-time defending World Champion Germany just 1.5 seconds back in third. Prior to the 1992 Olympics, Porter had rowed in the Canadian men's eight at the 1990 and 1991 World Championships, finishing second to Germany each time.

Following the 1992 Olympics, Porter took up sculling. In 1993, he won the Single Scull event at the World Rowing Championships, and was one of the favorites at the 1996 Summer Olympics; Porter led most of the race, only to be passed by Xeno Müller in the last 500 meters. Porter held on to win the silver medal ahead of two-time defending Olympic champion Thomas Lange, who finished third. Following that achievement, Porter was awarded the Order of British Columbia in 1996.

Following the 1996 Olympics, Porter devoted himself to chiropractic school, and finished twelfth and thirteenth at the 1997 and 1998 World Championships, respectively. In 1999, Porter devoted more practice time to rowing and would go on to place third at the 1999 World Championship in the single scull behind Muller and Rob Waddell.

One of the most anticipated rowing events at the 2000 Olympics was men's single scull. In addition to Porter, it featured two-time World Champion Rob Waddell, defending Olympic champion and three-time World Championship silver medalist Xeno Müller, and rising star Marcel Hacker. The race lived up to the hype. Porter finished fourth in the closest Olympic race ever, little over 2 seconds separated first from fourth.

=== Retirement from Olympics ===
Following the 2000 Olympics, Porter retired from rowing and kept in shape by running triathlons. In 2003, he was inducted into the University of Victoria hall of fame. Porter then started rowing again, winning the 2006 Canadian national team trials event in the single scull. Porter had planned to team with fellow Olympian Jake Wetzel in the double scull event at the 2006 World Championship, and possibly the 2008 Olympics, but shortly before the Canadian Speed Order trials, Wetzel hurt his back preventing the boat from competing at the 2006 World Championships. In 2012, Porter was inducted into the Canadian sports hall of fame.

== Personal life ==
Currently, Porter is a chiropractor living in Vancouver, British Columbia with his wife, Helen Rhee-Porter.

== Record ==
=== Olympics ===
- 2000, 4th, Single Scull (1x)
- 1996, Silver Medal, Single Scull (1x)
- 1992, Gold Medal, Eight (8+))

=== World Championships ===
- 1999, Bronze Medal, Single Scull (1x)
- 1998, 13th Place, Single Scull (1x)
- 1997, 12th Place, Single Scull (1x)
- 1995, 7th Place, Single Scull (1x)
- 1994, 8th Place, Single Scull (1x)
- 1993, Gold Medal, Single Scull (1x)
- 1991, Silver Medal, Eight(8+)
- 1990, Silver Medal, Eight(8+)
