= Roland Opfer =

German rower

Personal information
- Nationality: German
- Born: 3 December 1974 (age 50); Hamburg, West Germany

Sport
- Sport: Rowing

Roland Opfer (born 3 December 1974) is a German rower. He competed in the men's double sculls event at the 1996 Summer Olympics.
