= Valeriy Dosenko =

Soviet rower

Personal information
- Born: Valeriy Andriyovych Dosenko; 25 April 1965 (age 61)

Sport
- Sport: Rowing
Medal record
Men's rowing
Representing Soviet Union
World Rowing Championships
| Gold medal – first place | 1986 Nottingham | Quad scull |
| Gold medal – first place | 1987 Copenhagen | Quad scull |
| Gold medal – first place | 1990 Tasmania | Quad scull |
| Gold medal – first place | 1991 Vienna | Quad scull |

Valeriy Andriyovych Dosenko (born 25 April 1965) is a Soviet/Ukrainian rower. He won a gold medal at the 1986 World Rowing Championships in Nottingham with the men's quadruple sculls. He competed for the Unified Team at the 1992 Summer Olympics and came seventh in the quad scull.
