= Robert Thatcher =

British rower

Personal information
- Nationality: British
- Born: 23 August 1974 (age 51) Hillingdon, England

Sport
- Sport: Rowing

Robert Thatcher (born 23 August 1974) is a British rower. He competed in the men's double sculls event at the 1996 Summer Olympics.
