= Cyrus Beasley =

American rower

Personal information
- Born: February 29, 1972 (age 54) Newburyport, Massachusetts, United States

Sport
- Sport: Rowing
Medal record
Representing United States
Pan American Games
Silver medal – second place	1995 Mar del Plata	Single sculls

Cyrus Beasley (born February 29, 1972) is an American rower. He competed in the men's single sculls event at the 1996 Summer Olympics.
