= Ali Rıza Bilal =

Turkish rower

Personal information
- Nationality: Turkish
- Born: 2 April 1966 (age 60)

Sport
- Sport: Rowing

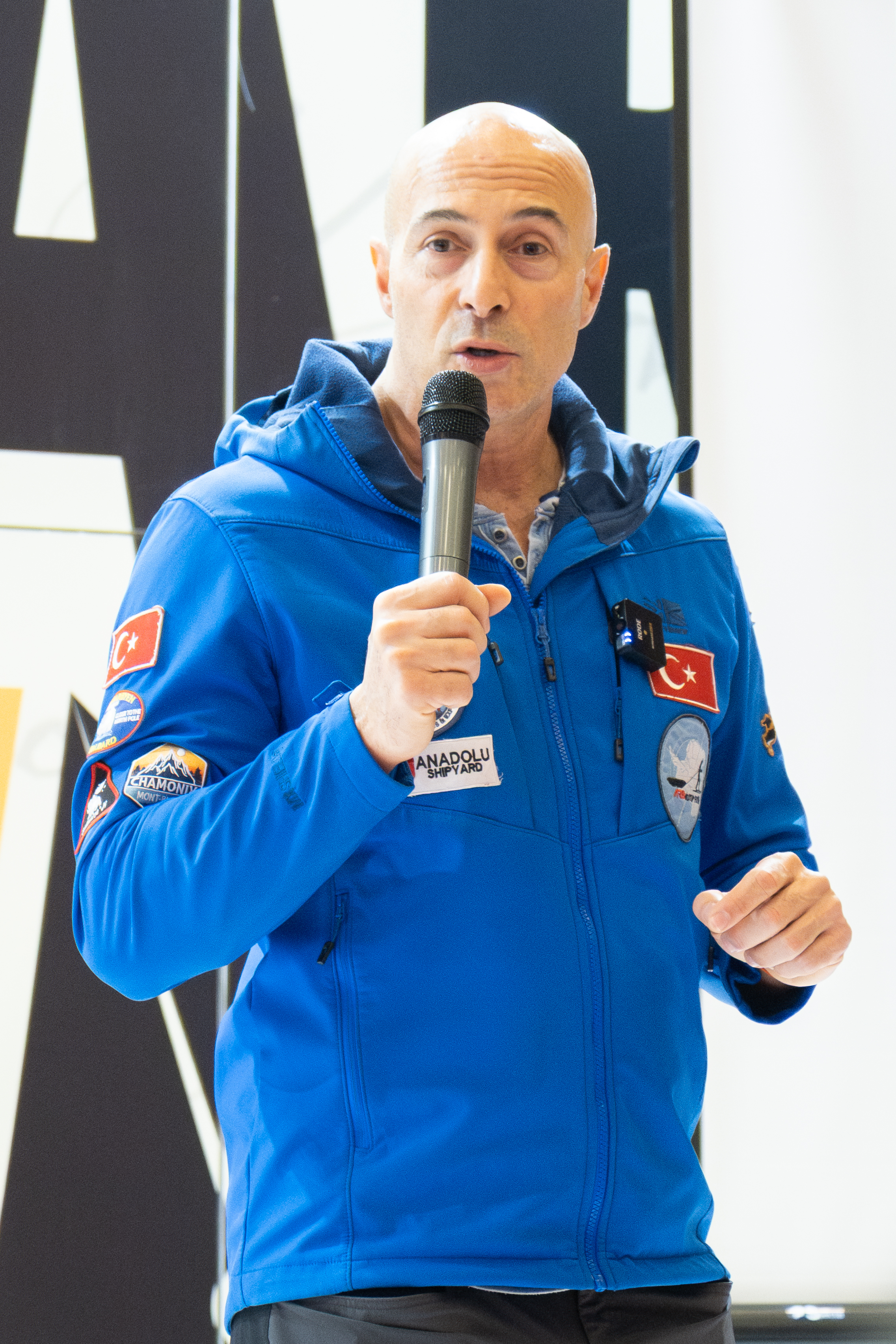
Ali Rıza Bilal at 42nd Istanbul Book Fair 2025.

Ali Rıza Bilal (born 2 April 1973) is a Turkish rower. He competed in the men's single sculls event at the 1992 Summer Olympics.
