= Andreas Hajek =

German rower (born 1968)

Personal information
- Born: 16 April 1968 (age 58) Weißenfels, East Germany
- Height: 195 cm (6 ft 5 in)
- Weight: 100 kg (220 lb)

Sport
- Sport: Rowing
Medal record
Men's rowing
Representing East Germany
World Championships
| Bronze medal – third place | 1986 Nottingham | Double sculls |
Representing Germany
Olympic Games
| Gold medal – first place | 1992 Barcelona | Quadruple sculls |
| Gold medal – first place | 1996 Atlanta | Quadruple sculls |
| Bronze medal – third place | 2000 Sydney | Quadruple sculls |
World Rowing Championships
| Gold medal – first place | 1993 Račice | Quadruple sculls |
| Gold medal – first place | 1997 Aiguebelette | Double sculls |
| Gold medal – first place | 1998 Cologne | Double sculls |
| Gold medal – first place | 1999 St. Catharines | Quadruple sculls |
| Gold medal – first place | 2001 Lucerne | Quadruple sculls |
| Silver medal – second place | 1995 Tampere | Quadruple sculls |
| Bronze medal – third place | 1994 Indianapolis | Quadruple sculls |
| Bronze medal – third place | 2002 Seville | Double sculls |

Andreas Hajek (born 16 April 1968 in Weißenfels) is a retired German rower.

At the 1986 World Rowing Championships, he replaced a sick Thomas Lange at short notice when he was only 18; he won a bronze medal at that occasion. Hajek was the youngest East German team member that year. During his career Hajek became a two-time Olympic champion and five-time world champion.
