= Cezary Jędrzycki =

Polish rower (1969–2026)

Personal information
- Nationality: Polish
- Born: 23 January 1969 Warsaw, Poland
- Died: 28 January 2026 (aged 57)

Sport
- Sport: Rowing

Cezary Jędrzycki (23 January 1969 – 28 January 2026) was a Polish rower. He competed in the men's quadruple sculls event at the 1992 Summer Olympics. Jędrzycki died on 28 January 2026, at the age of 57.
