= Anton Sema =

Russian rower

Personal information
- Nationality: Russian
- Born: 20 October 1978 (age 47)

Sport
- Sport: Rowing

Anton Alexandrovich Sema (born 20 October 1978) is a Russian rower. He was a bronze medalist at the 1995 World Junior Championships in Poland. He competed in the men's single sculls event at the 1996 Summer Olympicsin Atlanta where he placed 16th.

After finishing his career as an athlete, he switched to coaching.

He is the son of Soviet rowers Aleksandr Sema and Galina Yermolayeva.
