= Tomas Söderblom =

Finnish rower

Personal information
- Nationality: Finnish
- Born: 4 April 1972 (age 52); Pargas, Finland

Sport
- Sport: Rowing

Tomas Söderblom (born 4 April 1972) is a Finnish rower. He competed in the men's single sculls event at the 1996 Summer Olympics.
