= Mike Harris (rower) =

British rower

Personal information
- Nationality: British
- Born: 6 May 1969 (age 55); Barry, Vale of Glamorgan, Wales

Sport
- Sport: Rowing

Mike Harris (born 6 May 1969) is a British rower. He competed in the men's quadruple sculls event at the 1992 Summer Olympics.
