= Chip McKibben =

American rower

Personal information
- Full name: John Hansford McKibben
- Born: June 23, 1965 (age 61) Escondido, California, United States

Sport
- Sport: Rowing
Medal record
Representing United States
Pan American Games
Gold medal – first place	1995 Mar del Plata	Men's eights

John Hansford "Chip" McKibben (born June 23, 1965) is an American former rower. He competed in the men's quadruple sculls event at the 1992 Summer Olympics.
