= Christian Francis =

Lebanese rower (born 1968)

Personal information
- Nationality: Lebanese
- Born: 7 August 1968 (age 56)

Sport
- Sport: Rowing

Christian Francis (born 13 March 1968) is a Lebanese rower. He competed in the men's single sculls event at the 1992 Summer Olympics. He also competed in the 1991 World Rowing Championships in Vienna, Austria and in the 1992 Arab Rowing Championships in Cairo, Egypt, where he won second place to be awarded a silver medal.
