= Stefan Ullrich =

German rower

Personal information
- Born: 20 February 1965 (age 61)

Sport
- Sport: Rowing
- Club: SC Chemie Halle
Medal record
Representing East Germany
World Rowing Championships
Silver medal – second place	1990 Tasmania	Double sculls

Stefan Ullrich (born 20 February 1965) is a retired German rower. Together with Thomas Lange he won a national title and a silver medal in the double sculls at the 1990 World Rowing Championships.
