= Marcelus dos Santos =

Brazilian rower

Personal information
- Born: 9 February 1973 (age 53) Pelotas, Brazil

Sport
- Sport: Rowing
Medal record
Representing Brazil
Pan American Games
Silver medal – second place	1995 Mar del Plata	Double sculls
Silver medal – second place	2003 Santo Domingo	Double sculls
Silver medal – second place	2007 Rio de Janeiro	Eights
Bronze medal – third place	2003 Santo Domingo	Quadruple sculls
Bronze medal – third place	2007 Rio de Janeiro	Single sculls

Marcelus dos Santos Silva (born 9 February 1973) is a Brazilian rower. He competed in the men's double sculls event at the 1996 Summer Olympics.
