= Alexander Rückstuhl =

Swiss rower

Medal record

Men's rowing

Representing Switzerland

World Rowing Championships
Silver medal – second place	1990 Tasmania	M4x

Alexander Ruckstuhl (born 27 September 1971, in Kloten) is a Swiss rower. He finished 4th in the men's quadruple sculls at the 1992 Summer Olympics.
