= Lee Ho (rower) =

South Korean rower

Personal information
- Nationality: South Korean
- Born: 14 November 1976 (age 49)

Sport
- Sport: Rowing

Lee Ho (born 14 November 1976) is a South Korean rower. He competed in the men's double sculls event at the 1996 Summer Olympics.
