= Alexander Brandl =

Austrian swimmer

Personal information
- Born: 3 November 1971 (age 54)

Sport
- Sport: Swimming

Alexander Brandl (born 3 November 1971) is an Austrian butterfly swimmer. He competed in two events at the 1992 Summer Olympics.
