= Massimo Marconcini =

Italian rower

Personal information
- Nationality: Italian
- Born: 8 April 1968 (age 58) Livorno, Italy

Sport
- Sport: Rowing
Medal record
Representing Italy
Summer Universiade
Gold medal – first place	1989 Duisburg	Eights

Massimo Marconcini (born 8 April 1968) is an Italian rower. He competed in the men's single sculls event at the 1992 Summer Olympics.
