= Oleksandr Khimich =

Ukrainian rower

Personal information
- Nationality: Ukrainian
- Born: 9 April 1975 (age 49)

Sport
- Sport: Rowing

Oleksandr Khimich (born 9 April 1975) is a Ukrainian rower. He competed in the men's single sculls event at the 1996 Summer Olympics.
