= Fiorenzo Di Giovanni =

French rower

Personal information
- Nationality: French
- Born: 11 March 1967 (age 58); Neuilly-sur-Seine, France

Sport
- Sport: Rowing

Fiorenzo Di Giovanni (born 11 March 1967) is a French rower. He competed in the men's quadruple sculls event at the 1992 Summer Olympics.
