= Ihor Mohylniy =

Ukrainian rower

Personal information
- Nationality: Ukrainian
- Born: 4 October 1970 (age 55)

Sport
- Sport: Rowing
Medal record
Men's rowing
Representing Ukraine
Summer Universiade
Gold medal – first place	1993 Buffalo	Quadruple sculls

Ihor Mohylniy (born 4 October 1970) is a Ukrainian rower. He competed at the 1992 Summer Olympics and the 1996 Summer Olympics.
