= Roger Brown (rower) =

British rower

Personal information
- Nationality: British
- Born: 4 July 1969 (age 55); Hexham, England

Sport
- Sport: Rowing

Roger Brown (born 4 July 1969) is a British rower. He competed at the 1992 Summer Olympics and the 1996 Summer Olympics.

Brown graduated from Durham University (Hild Bede College) in 1989. He is a former member of Durham University Boat Club. In 1990, he took Gold in the Men's Eight at the Under-23 World Rowing Championships (then known as the Nations Cup) alongside fellow DUBC member Russell Slatford.
