= Günther Schuster =

Austrian rower

Personal information
- Nationality: Austrian
- Born: 25 July 1963 (age 61); Vienna, Austria

Sport
- Sport: Rowing

Günther Schuster (born 25 July 1963) is an Austrian rower. He competed in the men's quadruple sculls event at the 1992 Summer Olympics.
