= David Cameron (rower) =

Australian rower

Personal information
- Nationality: Australian
- Born: 11 March 1974 (age 52) Maclean, New South Wales
- Height: 193 cm (6 ft 4 in)

Sport
- Country: Australia
- Sport: Rowing
- Club: Lower Clarence Rowing Club

Achievements and titles
- Olympic finals: 1996
Medal record
Representing Australia
World Rowing Championships
Silver medal – second place	1997 Aiguebelette	M2+
Junior World Rowing Championships
Silver medal – second place	1992 Montreal	JM2-

David Allan Cameron (born 11 March 1974) is an Australian former rower. He was an Australian national champion and an Olympian, and won a silver medal at both junior and senior World Rowing Championships.

== Club and state rowing ==
Cameron was born in Maclean, New South Wales, and his senior rowing was initially from the Lower Clarence Rowing Club in that town.

He contested and won the Australian national U23 men's single sculls title in Lower Clarence club colours at the Australian Rowing Championships. in 1996, 1997 and 1998 he competed for the senior men's single sculls Australian championship.

Cameron's state selection first came in 1996 when he was the New South Wales state representative single sculler who contested and won the President's Cup at the Interstate Regatta within the Australian Rowing Championships. He contested the President's Cup again in 1998 in New South Wales skyblue. In 1999 he was selected in the New South Wales men's eight to race for the King's Cup in the Interstate Regatta.

== International representative rowing ==
Cameron made his Australian representative debut at the age of eighteen at the 1992 Junior World Rowing Championships in Montreal in an Australian junior coxless pair in which he took second place and won a silver medal.

In 1995 he was selected as Australia's single sculler to contest the 1995 World Rowing U23 Championships in Groningen. He finished in twelfth place. For the 1996 Atlanta Olympics Cameron was Australia's selected single scull and coached by Harald Jahrling he competed and finished in thirteenth place.

In 1997 at the World Championships in Aiguebelette he raced the Australian coxed pair with Nick McDonald-Crowley and steered by David Colvin to second place and Cameron's sole senior World Championship medal - a silver. At the 1998 World Rowing Championships in Cologne, Cameron made his final Australian representative appearance when he rowed in the seven seat of the Australian eight which achieved a sixth-place finish.

== Personal ==
During his representative rowing career and in the ten years that followed, Cameron worked in financial services, including roles at Westpac, National Australia Bank and JPMorgan Chase.

Cameron went on to complete a bachelor's degree in Science (Physics and Earth Sciences) at the University of Sydney and a Master of Education at the University of New England. In 2015 he moved into teaching and has taught at Newington College. In 2019, he commenced teaching at the Cranbrook School in Sydney's eastern suburbs where he also coaches rowing. Following his successful rowing career, Cameron has coached school and club rowing with coaching appointments in Sydney at The King's School (2001–2003), Newington College (2014–2018) and Leichhardt Rowing Club (since 2015). He has been an Australian Army reservist since 2014.

Cameron was married to politician and Olympic skier Zali Steggall from 1999 until their separation in 2006. They have two children from their marriage.
