= Ģirts Vilks =

Soviet rower

Personal information
- Born: 12 April 1968 (age 58)

Sport
- Sport: Rowing
Medal record
Men's rowing
Representing Soviet Union
World Rowing Championships
Gold medal – first place	1990 Tasmania	Quad scull
Gold medal – first place	1991 Vienna	Quad scull

Ģirts Vilks (born 12 April 1968) is a Soviet rower. He won a gold medal at the 1990 World Rowing Championships in Tasmania with the men's quadruple sculls. He competed for the Unified Team at the 1992 Summer Olympics and came seventh in the quad scull.
