= Rutger Arisz =

Dutch rower (born 1970)

Personal information
- Born: 11 February 1970 (age 56)

Sport
- Sport: Rowing
Medal record
Men's rowing
Representing the Netherlands
World Rowing Championships
Gold medal – first place	1989 Bled	Quad scull

Rutger Arisz (born 11 February 1970) is a Dutch rower. He won a gold medal at the 1989 World Rowing Championships in Bled with the men's quadruple sculls.
