= John Riley (rower) =

American rower

Medal record

Men's rowing

Representing United States

World Rowing Championships
Gold medal – first place	1986 Nottingham	M4-
Bronze medal – third place	1987 Copenhagen	M4-

John Riley (born February 14, 1964, in Marin County, California) is an American rower.

Riley began his career at the University of Rhode Island in 1982. Between 1986 and 1995, he raced on ten United States National Championship teams, rowed in two Olympic Games (1988: Seoul, South Korea; 1992: Barcelona, Spain), and participated in the 1990 Goodwill Games. In August 1986, he won the gold medal in the heavyweight fours without coxswain at the World Rowing Championships in Nottingham, England. His teammates were Ted Swinford, Robert Espeseth and Dan Lyons.

In 1996 he was inducted to the United States Rowing Hall of Fame, and in 1999 he was inducted into the University of Rhode Island's Athletic Hall of Fame.

In 2007 Riley took the US ltwt men's 2x, Liverman and Montgomery, to the World Championships in Munich, Germany. He also coached them at the 2007 Pan American Games in Rio de Janeiro, Brazil where they won a silver medal; he also took PennAC's collegiate men's sweep program.

Riley resides in Philadelphia, Pennsylvania, where he is a rowing coach
