= Tommy Österlund =

Swedish rower

Personal information
- Nationality: Swedish
- Born: 8 June 1966 (age 58); Stockholm, Sweden

Sport
- Sport: Rowing

Tommy Österlund (born 8 June 1966) is a Swedish rower. He competed in the men's quadruple sculls event at the 1992 Summer Olympics.
