= Robert Kaehler =

American rower (born 1964)

Personal information
- Born: April 5, 1964 (age 62) California, United States

Sport
- Sport: Rowing
- Club: Rutgers Scarlet Knights
Medal record
Men's rowing
Representing United States
World Rowing Championships
Gold medal – first place	1994 Indianapolis	M8+
Gold medal – first place	1997 Aiguebelette	M8+
Gold medal – first place	1998 Cologne	M8+
Gold medal – first place	1999 St. Catharines	M8+
Bronze medal – third place	1995 Tampere	M8+
Pan American Games
Gold medal – first place	1995 Mar del Plata	Coxless fours
Gold medal – first place	1995 Mar del Plata	Eights

Robert J. "Bob" Kaehler (born April 5, 1964) is an American rower. He finished 5th in the men's eight at the 1996 Summer Olympics and the 2000 Summer Olympics.

== Education ==
Kaehler is a graduate of the Columbia University College of Physicians and Surgeons (1991) with an MS in Physical Therapy.

== Career ==
Kaehler started his sports career as an athlete on the U.S. National Rowing Team. His athletic career spanned over a decade and included two World University Games, several World Cup events, seven World Championships, and three Olympic Games. Kaehler's results include: Olympics—1992 (M4X—8th), 1996 (M8+ -- 5th), 2000 (M8+ -- 5th); World Champion M8+ -- 1994, 1997, 1998, and 1999.

Kaehler remains the most successful U.S. male heavyweight rower at the World Championships level with his four world titles, including a three-straight streak (1997–1999) with U.S. coach Mike Teti. For his wins and contributions to the sport of U.S. rowing, Kaehler was inducted into the Rowing Hall of Fame in March 2012.

Along with three titles (San Diego Training Center U.S.A. -- Men's 8+) Kaehler still holds current records at the Henley Royal Regatta (Barrier and Fawley).

== Personal life ==
Kaehler lives with his wife and three children in Pennsylvania.
