= André Willms =

German rower

Personal information
- Born: 18 September 1972 (age 53) Burg bei Magdeburg, East Germany
- Height: 201 cm (6 ft 7 in)
- Weight: 101 kg (223 lb)

Sport
- Sport: Rowing
- Club: Ruderclub Magdeburg
Medal record
Men's rowing
Representing Germany
Olympic Games
Gold medal – first place	1992 Barcelona	Quadruple sculls
Gold medal – first place	1996 Atlanta	Quadruple sculls
Bronze medal – third place	2000 Sydney	Quadruple sculls
World Rowing Championships
Gold medal – first place	1993 Račice	Quadruple sculls
Gold medal – first place	1994 Indianapolis	Single sculls
Gold medal – first place	1999 St. Catharines	Quadruple sculls
Gold medal – first place	2001 Lucerne	Quadruple sculls
Gold medal – first place	2003 Milan	Quadruple sculls
Silver medal – second place	1995 Tampere	Quadruple sculls
Silver medal – second place	1997 Aiguebelette	Single sculls
Bronze medal – third place	2002 Seville	Double sculls

André Willms (born 18 September 1972 in Burg bei Magdeburg) is a retired German rower. During his career Willms became a double Olympic champion and five-time world champion.
