= Gert Port =

Austrian rower

Personal information
- Nationality: Austrian
- Born: 23 July 1968 (age 56); Klagenfurt, Austria

Sport
- Sport: Rowing

Gert Port (born 23 July 1968) is an Austrian rower. He competed in the men's quadruple sculls event at the 1992 Summer Olympics.
