= Xeno Müller =

Swiss rower

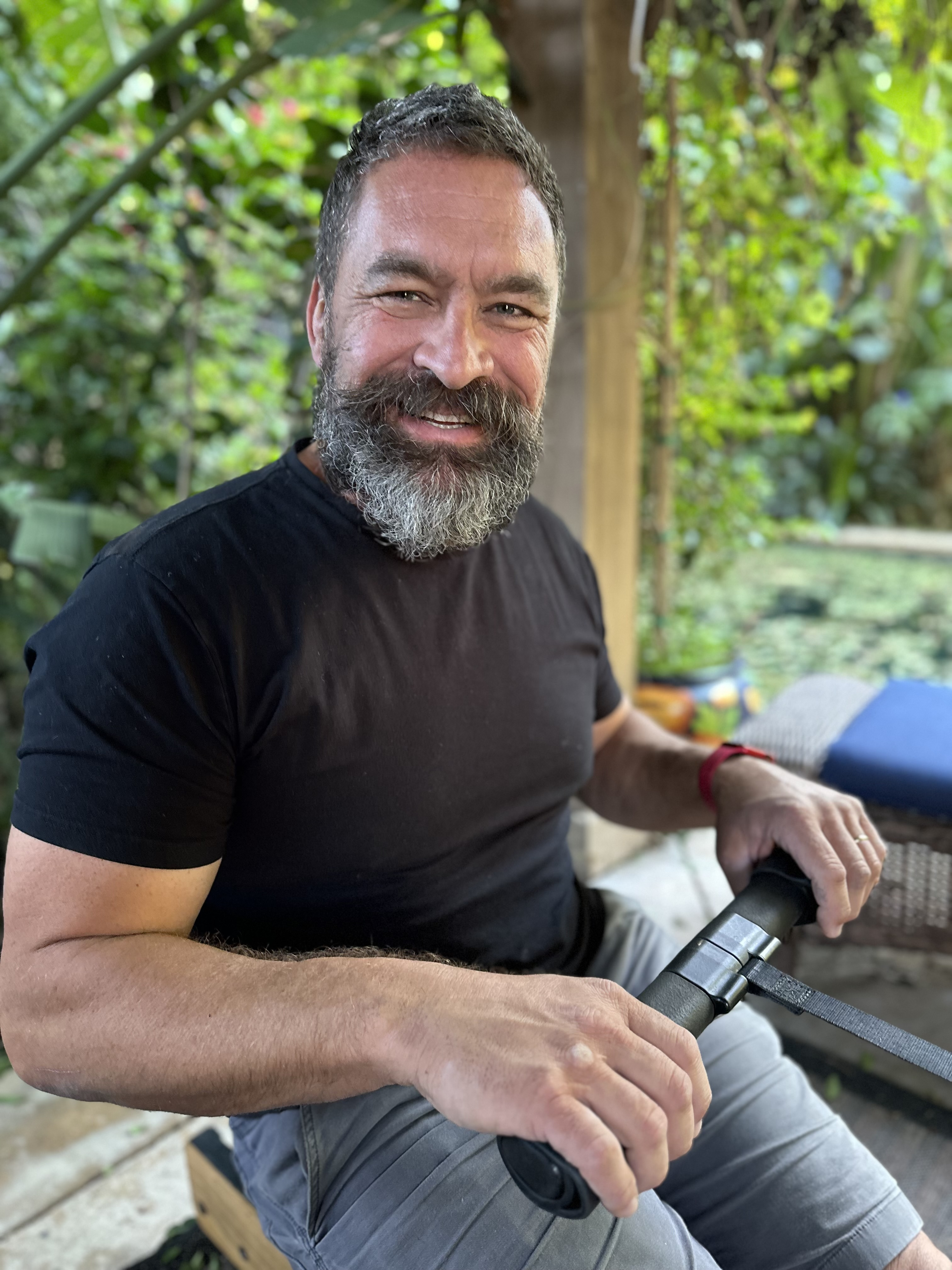

Personal information
- Born: 7 August 1972 (age 54) Zürich, Switzerland
- Weight: 100 kg (220 lb)
- Website: elite-rowing-coach.com

Sport
- Sport: Rowing
Medal record
Men's rowing
Representing Switzerland
Olympic Games
Gold medal – first place	1996 Atlanta	Single scull
Silver medal – second place	2000 Sydney	Single scull
World Championships
Silver medal – second place	1994 Indianapolis	Single scull
Silver medal – second place	1998 Cologne	Single scull
Silver medal – second place	1999 St. Catharines	Single scull

Xeno R. Müller (born 7 August 1972) is a Swiss rower and Olympic gold medallist.

== Early career and university ==
His first international appearance was at the 1990 World Rowing Junior Championships – winning bronze in his single scull (1x).

He first competed at the senior level in 1991, and at the age of 19, finished 11th at the World Rowing Championships in Vienna in the single scull. At the 1992 Barcelona Olympics, he just missed making the finals, finishing fourth in the semi-finals (3 to advance). Müller chose not to start the petite (consolation) finals for places 7 through 12 because of a back injury. In 1994 and 1995, he finished 2nd and 6th, respectively, at the World Championships.

During this period, Müller began studying at Brown University in the United States. He helped lead Brown to an undefeated season and a national championship in 1993 in the eight-man boat. Following this collegiate victory and his subsequent disappointing finish at the 1993 World Championships in the double scull event, Müller decided to concentrate solely on the single scull. This decision created friction between Müller and the then coach at Brown Steve Gladstone.

In 1994 Müller was the first ever single sculler rowing the 2000 meters in a time way below 6.40. Müller showed a first dominating season in his single with winning the Overall FISA Rowing World Cup and World Cup Races in Paris with a time of 6.38, Lucerne with a new 'Rotsee' record also below 6.40 and the Diamond Sculls at Henley Royal Regatta. Only at the World Championships he was defeated by the German André Willms.

After spending two years in Providence, Rhode Island, attending Brown and rowing his single scull, Müller moved to Newport Beach, California, which offered a better climate for year-round training. He also met his future wife in Newport.

== Olympic debut ==
Müller won gold in the single scull at the 1996 Atlanta Olympics. Müller won the race with a strong finish. He was 3 seconds down and in fourth place at the 1000 meter mark (half way) and he moved up to third and just 1 second down with 500 meters to go. Müller then launched a devastating drive to the line. He won decisively besting Derek Porter who had led the whole race, and his childhood hero, and two-time Olympic Champion Thomas Lange who finished third. Müller's last 500 was the fastest 500 meter split time of the day. His time of 6:44.85 has been an Olympic record until Tim Maeyens of Belgium finished his heat at the 2012 London Olympics in a time of 6:42.52.

== 1998 season onwards ==
Following his Olympic victory, Müller took a year off from rowing. In 1998, he won two World Cup race besting future rival Rob Waddell. But at the World Rowing Championships, Waddell had the best race of his life pushing Müller back to second. In the pre-season to the 1998 rowing calendar, Waddell set a world record on the indoor rowing machine. In 1999, Waddell went on to sweep the World Cup races and the World Championships, Müller getting second each time.

Leading up to the 2000 Sydney Olympics, Müller entered World Cup race in Vienna, where he finally beat Waddell after four consecutive second-place finishes. Müller did not enter any other preliminary races, and Waddell won the World Cup race in Lucerne. Between the 1996 Olympics and the 2000 Olympics, Müller's record against Waddell was 3 out of 7.

Both Waddell and Müller won all of their preliminary heats leading up to the Olympic finals. In the finals, in addition to his rival two-time reigning World Champion Rob Waddell, Müller faced former World Champion and Olympic silver medalist Derek Porter and rising star Marcel Hacker. It was the closest men's single scull final ever. They battled down the course with the lead changing several times. Müller gained the lead in the last 1000 meters, but Waddell stayed with him. Gradually, Waddell wore Müller down, passing him in the sprint. Despite having a chest cold, Müller held on for the silver medal. Hacker finished third and a disappointed Porter finished fourth. Just over two seconds – the length of a boat – separated first from fourth place.

== Retirement and career ==
Having lived in the United States since 1992 (and attending Brown University) Müller became a naturalized citizen of the United States in early 2004. He then announced he would trial for the US team for the Athens Olympics. He had won all of the preliminary trial races. However, just before the start of the final set of trials, there were a number of high-profile killings of foreigners in Iraq as part of the Iraq War, and Americans were believed to be potential targets for violence at the Olympics by al-Qaeda. Müller pulled out of the trials, saying:

When you have three children and a wife and you leave them, then leave them again to go overseas, and you see somebody's head getting cut off ... you start having clouds in your head for why you want to proceed like this, with all the responsibility about traveling, leaving the family, etcetera.

He is married and has four children.

== Achievements ==
- Olympic medals: 1 gold, 1 silver
- World Championship medals: 3 silver
- Junior World Championship medals: 1 bronze

=== Olympic Games ===
- 2000 – Silver, single sculls
- 1996 – Gold, single sculls
- 1992 – 12th (DNS petite finals), single sculls

=== World Championships ===
- 2001 – 5th, single sculls
- 1999 – Silver, single sculls
- 1998 – Silver, single sculls
- 1995 – 6th, single sculls
- 1994 – Silver, single sculls
- 1993 – 8th, double sculls
- 1991 – 11th, single sculls

=== Junior World Championships ===
- 1990 – Bronze, single sculls

=== US collegiate rowing ===
- 1993 – 1st, Varsity 8+ (Brown) Eastern Sprints
- 1993 – 1st, Varsity 8+ (Brown) Intercollegiate Rowing Association Championship
- 1993 – 1st, Varsity 8+ (Brown) National Collegiate Rowing Championship
- 1992 – 1st, Freshman 8+ (Brown) Eastern Sprints
- 1992 – 1st, Freshman 8+ (Brown) Intercollegiate Rowing Association Championship

=== Henley Royal Regatta ===
- 1993 – 1st, Ladies' Challenge Plate 8+ (Brown University)
- 1994 – 1st, Diamond Challenge Sculls 1x
