= Bruno López =

Spanish rower

Personal information
- Nationality: Spanish
- Born: 6 September 1971 (age 53); Castropol, Asturias, Spain

Sport
- Sport: Rowing

Bruno López Rodríguez (born 6 September 1971) is a Spanish rower. He competed in the men's quadruple sculls event at the 1992 Summer Olympics.
