= Björn Hendrickx =

Belgian rower

Personal information
- Nationality: Belgian
- Born: 10 April 1974 (age 50); Ostend, Belgium

Sport
- Sport: Rowing

Björn Hendrickx (born 10 April 1974) is a Belgian rower. He competed at the 1996 Summer Olympics and the 2000 Summer Olympics.
