= Lars Christensen (rower) =

Danish rower

Medal record

Men's rowing

Representing Denmark

World Rowing Championships
Gold medal – first place	1995 Tampere	M2x

Lars Christensen (born 27 March 1965 in Silkeborg) is a Danish rower. Together with Martin Haldbo Hansen he finished fourth in the double sculls at the 1996 Olympics.
