= Konstantinos Kariotis =

Greek rower (born 1971)

Personal information
- Nationality: Greek
- Born: 1 October 1971 (age 53); Stuttgart, Germany

Sport
- Sport: Rowing

Konstantinos Kariotis (born 1 October 1971) is a Greek rower. He competed in the men's single sculls event at the 1992 Summer Olympics.
