= Piotr Bujnarowski =

Polish rower

Personal information
- Nationality: Polish
- Born: 4 July 1972 (age 54) Toruń, Poland

Sport
- Sport: Rowing
Medal record
Representing Poland
Summer Universiade
Bronze medal – third place	1993 Buffalo	Quadruple sculls

Piotr Bujnarowski (born 4 July 1972) is a Polish rower. He competed at the 1992 Summer Olympics and the 1996 Summer Olympics.
