= José Antonio Rodríguez (rower) =

Spanish rower

Personal information
- Full name: José Antonio Rodríguez Martínez
- Born: 23 May 1968 (age 57) Castropol, Asturias, Spain

Sport
- Country: Spain
- Sport: Rowing

José Antonio Rodríguez Martínez (Note: In this Spanish name, the first or paternal surname is Rodríguez and the second or maternal family name is Martínez.) (born 23 May 1968) is a Spanish rower. He competed in the men's quadruple sculls event at the 1992 Summer Olympics.
