= Merten Mauritz =

Austrian fencer

Personal information
- Born: 22 December 1965 (age 60) Vienna, Austria

Sport
- Sport: Fencing

Merten Mauritz (born 22 December 1965) is an Austrian fencer. He competed in the team foil event at the 1992 Summer Olympics.
