= Niall O'Toole =

Irish rower (born 1970)

Medal record

Men's rowing

Representing Ireland

World Rowing Championships
Gold medal – first place	1991 Vienna	LM1x
Silver medal – second place	1994 Indianapolis	LM1x

Niall O'Toole (born 26 March 1970 in Dublin) is an Irish rower with Commercial Rowing Club. He competed in three Olympics:

- Barcelona 1992 – Men's Single Scull – 21st
- Atlanta 1996 – Men's Double Sculls – 3rd in Repechage
- Athens 2004 – Men's Lightweight Four – 6th

He won the Men's World Lightweight Single Sculls Championship in 1991 in Vienna and took a silver medal in the same event on Indianapolis in 1994.
