= Michael Steinbach =

German rower (born 1969)

Medal record

Men's rowing

Representing Germany

Olympic Games
Gold medal – first place	1992 Barcelona	Quadruple sculls

Michael Steinbach (born 3 September 1969, in Ueberlingen) is a retired German rower who won a gold medal at the 1992 Barcelona Olympics.
