= Joaquín Gómez (rower) =

Mexican rower (born 1967)

Personal information
- Nationality: Mexican
- Born: 19 June 1967 (age 59)

Sport
- Sport: Rowing
Medal record
Representing Mexico
Pan American Games
Gold medal – first place	1991 Havana	Single sculls
Silver medal – second place	1987 Indianapolis	Single sculls
Central American and Caribbean Games
Gold medal – first place	1986 Santiago	Coxless pairs
Gold medal – first place	1986 Santiago	Coxed pairs
Gold medal – first place	1986 Santiago	Quadruple sculls
Gold medal – first place	1990 Mexico City	Single sculls
Gold medal – first place	1990 Mexico City	Double sculls
Gold medal – first place	1990 Mexico City	Eights

Joaquín Gómez Gurza (born 19 June 1967) is a Mexican rower. He competed at the 1988 Summer Olympics and the 1992 Summer Olympics.
