= Alessandro Corona =

Italian rower (born 1972)

Medal record

Men's rowing

Representing Italy

Olympic Games
Bronze medal – third place	1992 Barcelona	Quadruple sculls

World Championships
Gold medal – first place	1994 Indianapolis	M4x
Gold medal – first place	1995 Tampere	M4x
Gold medal – first place	1997 Aiguebelette	M4x
Gold medal – first place	1998 Cologne	M4x
Silver medal – second place	1991 Vienna	M4x
Bronze medal – third place	1990 Tasmania	M4x
Bronze medal – third place	1993 Račice	M4x

Alessandro Corona (born 9 January 1972, in Ortona) is an Italian rower. He won the bronze medal in the quadruple sculls at the 1992 Summer Olympics.
