= Jesús Posse =

Uruguayan rower (born 1966)

Personal information
- Nationality: Uruguayan
- Born: 2 April 1966 (age 59)

Sport
- Sport: Rowing

Jesús Posse (born 2 April 1966) is a Uruguayan rower. He competed at the 1988 Summer Olympics and the 1992 Summer Olympics. Posse was the flag bearer for Uruguay in the opening ceremony of the 1988 Summer Olympics.
