= Stephan Volkert =

German rower

Medal record

Men's rowing

Representing Germany

Olympic Games
Gold medal – first place	1992 Barcelona	Quadruple sculls
Gold medal – first place	1996 Atlanta	Quadruple sculls
Bronze medal – third place	2000 Sydney	Quadruple sculls

World Rowing Championships
Gold medal – first place	1993 Račice	Quadruple sculls
Gold medal – first place	1997 Aiguebelette	Double sculls
Gold medal – first place	1998 Cologne	Double sculls
Gold medal – first place	1999 St. Catharines	Quadruple sculls
Gold medal – first place	2002 Seville	Quadruple sculls
Gold medal – first place	2003 Milan	Quadruple sculls
Silver medal – second place	1995 Tampere	Double sculls
Bronze medal – third place	1994 Indianapolis	Quadruple sculls

Stephan Volkert (born 7 August 1971 in Cologne) is a retired German rower. During his career Volkert became a two-time Olympic champion and six-time world champion.
