= Tom Symoens =

Belgian rower

Personal information
- Nationality: Belgian
- Born: 7 July 1969 (age 57) Bruges, Belgium

Sport
- Sport: Rowing
Medal record
Representing Belgium
Summer Universiade
Bronze medal – third place	1993 Buffalo	Single sculls

Tom Marie Symoens (born 7 July 1969) is a Belgian rower. He competed at the 1992 Summer Olympics and the 1996 Summer Olympics.
