= Gábor Mitring =

Hungarian rower

Personal information
- Nationality: Hungarian
- Born: 10 February 1967 (age 58); Győr, Hungary

Sport
- Sport: Rowing

Gábor Mitring (born 10 February 1967) is a Hungarian rower. He competed at the 1988 Summer Olympics, 1992 Summer Olympics and the 1996 Summer Olympics.
