= Walter Kaiser (rower) =

Austrian rower

Personal information
- Nationality: Austrian
- Born: 29 April 1971 (age 54) Klagenfurt, Austria

Sport
- Sport: Rowing

Walter Kaiser (born 29 April 1971) is an Austrian rower. He competed in the men's quadruple sculls event at the 1992 Summer Olympics.
