= Thomas Lange =

German rower (born 1964)

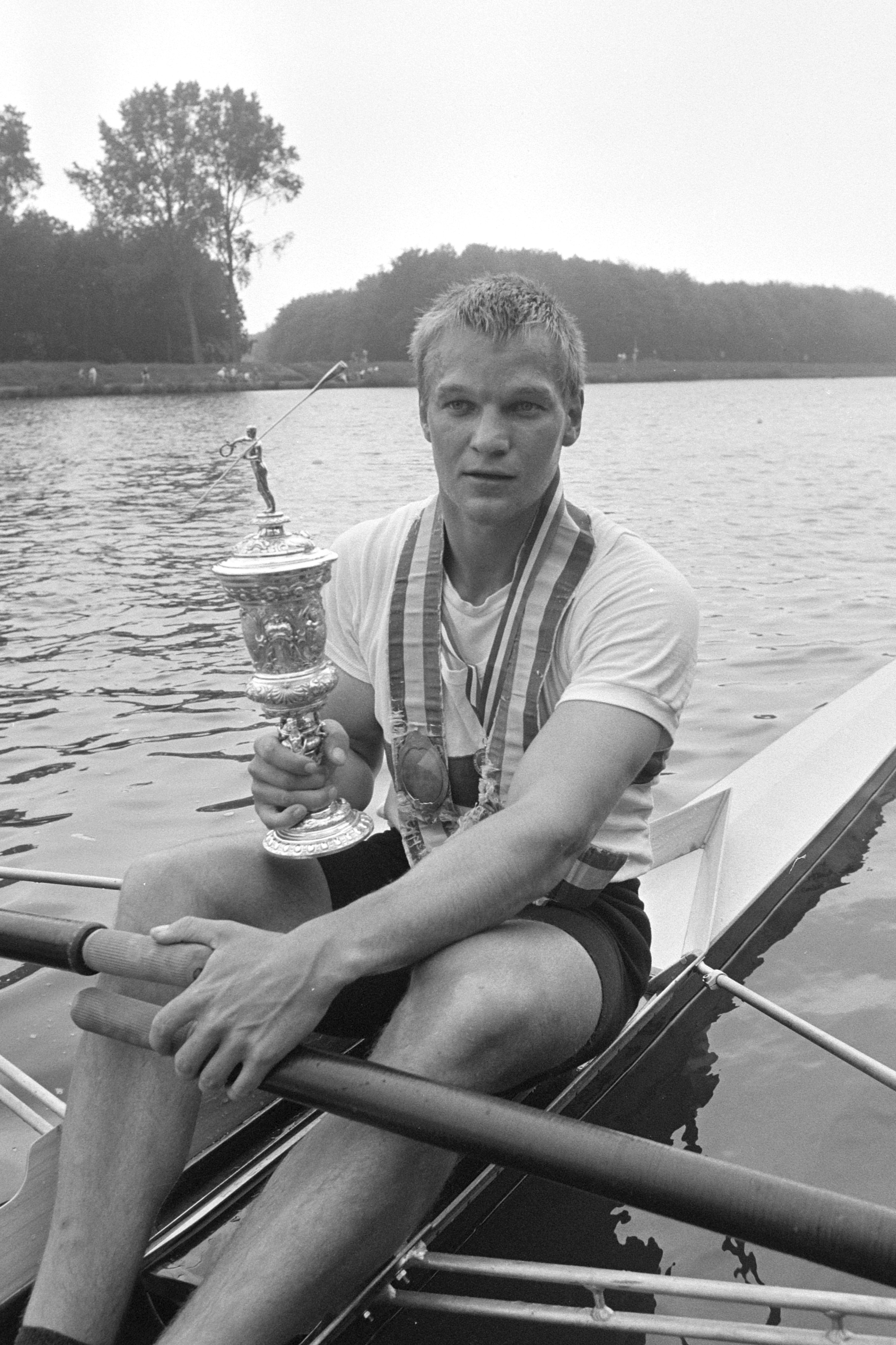
- Lange in 1987

Personal information
- Born: 27 February 1964 (age 62) Eisleben, East Germany
- Height: 1.89 m (6 ft 2 in)
- Weight: 89 kg (196 lb)

Sport
- Sport: Rowing
- Club: SV Halle, Halle an der Saale
Medal record
Men's rowing
Representing East Germany
Olympic Games
Gold medal – first place	1988 Seoul	Single sculls
World Championships
Gold medal – first place	1983 Duisburg	Double sculls
Gold medal – first place	1985 Hazewinkel	Double sculls
Gold medal – first place	1987 Copenhagen	Single sculls
Gold medal – first place	1989 Bled	Single sculls
Silver medal – second place	1990 Tasmania	Double sculls
Representing Germany
Olympic Games
Gold medal – first place	1992 Barcelona	Single sculls
Bronze medal – third place	1996 Atlanta	Single sculls
World Championships
Gold medal – first place	1991 Vienna	Single sculls
Bronze medal – third place	1993 Račice	Single sculls

Thomas Lange (born 27 February 1964) is a German rower who won two gold and one bronze Olympic medals in the single sculls.

Lange is one of six rowers (along with Mahé Drysdale, Pertti Karppinen, Peter-Michael Kolbe, Ondřej Synek and Vyacheslav Ivanov) to win medals in the single sculls in three different Olympics.

== Biography ==
His first international appearance was at the 1980 World Rowing Junior Championships, where he won the gold medal in the double sculls (2x). He then went on to win the singles title in the next two Junior World Championships.

He first competed at the senior level in 1983, and at the age of 19, won the double sculls at the World Rowing Championships with Uwe Heppner, which they repeated in 1985. Lange and Heppner would have been the favorites for the 1984 Summer Olympics in Los Angeles, but East Germany chose to boycott the games.

In 1986, Lange changed to the single sculls. However, illness prevented him from competing that year. He recovered by 1987 and won his first World Championship in the single sculls besting Pertti Karppinen and Peter-Michael Kolbe who between then had won 10 of the previous 12 World and Olympic titles. Lange repeated this feat by winning the 1988 Summer Olympics in Seoul. In 1989 he again won the World Championship.

By that time, East Germany was disintegrating, and Lange began his studies as a medical doctor. His father was a member of the Stasi and committed suicide. Despite his demanding schedule and the emotional angst of his country's disintegration, in 1990, with Stefan Ullrich, Lange won a silver medal in the double sculls at the world championships.

In 1991, representing the unified Germany, Lange again won the world title in the single sculls. At the 1992 Summer Olympics in Barcelona, Lange was a repeat winner in the single. For Lange, this was his fifth straight (non-consecutive) World Championship or Olympic victory in the single sculls.

Lange would go on to take third at the 1993 World championships and won the Diamond Challenge Sculls (the premier singles sculls event) at the Henley Royal Regatta, rowing for the Ruderverein Bollberg-Halle. He took 1994 off to concentrate on his medical studies before finishing out of the running in the 1995 World Championships, and come back to claim a bronze medal at the 1996 Summer Olympics behind Switzerland's Xeno Müller and Canada's Derek Porter.

In October 1986, he was awarded a Patriotic Order of Merit in gold (first class) for his sporting success. In 1997, Lange was awarded the Thomas Keller Medal for an outstanding career in rowing. Currently Lange works a medical doctor in Ratzeburg.
