= Filippo Soffici =

Italian rower (born 1970)

Personal information
- Born: 9 February 1970 (age 56) Florence, Italy

Sport
- Sport: Rowing
- Club: Fiamme Oro
Medal record
Olympic Games
Bronze medal – third place	1992 Barcelona	Quadruple sculls
World Rowing Championships
Silver medal – second place	1989 Bled	M4x
Silver medal – second place	1991 Vienna	M4x
Bronze medal – third place	1990 Tasmania	M4x

Filippo Soffici (born 9 February 1970) is an Italian rower.
