= Uģis Lasmanis =

Latvian rower (born 1967)

Personal information
- Nationality: Latvian
- Born: 29 July 1967 (age 58) Ventspils, Latvia

Sport
- Sport: Rowing

Uģis Lasmanis (born 29 July 1967) is a Latvian rower. He competed at the 1992 Summer Olympics and the 1996 Summer Olympics.
