= Jason Day (rower) =

Australian rower (born 1970)

Personal information
- Full name: Jason Scott Day
- Born: 28 November 1970 (age 55) Kerang, Victoria, Australia
- Height: 6 ft 4 in (193 cm)
- Weight: 189 lb (86 kg)

Sport
- Club: Bendigo Rowing Club; UTS Haberfield Rowing Club
Medal record
Men's rowing
Representing Australia
World Rowing Championships
Bronze medal – third place	1999 St. Catharines, CAN	M4X
Commonwealth Rowing Championships
Silver medal – second place	1994 Ontario, CAN	M1X
Junior World Rowing Championships
Silver medal – second place	1988 Milan, ITA	JM1X

Jason Scott Day (born 28 November 1970) is an Australian rower who competed at three Olympic Games.

== Club and state rowing ==
Day commenced rowing with the Bendigo Rowing Club on their 500m Lake Waroona home water. His later senior club rowing when in elite Australian training programs was from the UTS Haberfield Rowing Club in Sydney.

Day first made state selection for Victoria in 1993 to contest the President's Cup - the Interstate single sculls title within the Australian Rowing Championships. He placed fourth that year. He contested further President's Cups in 1994, 1998 and 2001. He won that national title in 1994.

== International representative rowing ==
Day's national representative debut came in 1988 when he was selected as Australia's single sculls entrant for the 1988 Junior World Rowing Championships in Milan. He came second at the world junior championship and won a silver medal.

In 1990 aged nineteen he was elevated to the Australian senior squad and into the quad scull. He raced in the quad at the 1990 World Rowing Championships in Lake Barrington to a seventh-place finish. The following year he was selected to row the coxless pair with Richard Powell. They finished fifth at the 1991 World Rowing Championships in Vienna.

In the 1992 Olympic year Day and Powell combined with Hamish McGlashan and Robin Bakker to row Australia's quad scull. Day stroked the crew. They failed to make the A final and finished in overall ninth place. Day carried on rowing at the elite world level in 1993 and raced in a double scull at the 1993 World Rowing Championships with the stalwart Australian champion sculler Peter Antonie. They won their heat but a bad row in the semi-final had them finish fourth and sent to the B final which they won, for an overall seventh-place finish.

In 1994 he raced as the Australian single sculls representative at the World Championships in Indianapolis. He finished fifteenth overall. In 1995 Day and Ron Snook joined Bo Hanson and Duncan Free who were continuing in the Australian quad scull. They finished in eight place at the 1995 World Rowing Championships in Tampere. The 1996 Olympic year saw Day picked to again row Australia's double scull with Peter Antonie. They rowed to an eighth-place finish.

Following a long post-Olympics break from national representation, Day along with Duncan Free, stepped back into the Australian quad in 1999 with Stuart Reside and Peter Hardcastle who'd been constant in that boat from 1998, to commence their Olympic campaign for Sydney 2000. They raced at a World Rowing Cup in 1999 and then at the 1999 World Rowing Championships in St Catharines they battled through the preliminaries placing third in their heat, winning their repechage, coming third in their semi-final (facing the ultimate gold and silver medalists Germany and Ukraine) and then repeating the semi-final result with a third place and a bronze medal in the final. In the 2000 Olympic year they raced at two World Rowing Cups before coming to the Sydney 2000 where they made the final and finished in fourth place.

Although he'd made three Olympic appearances, Day's Australian representative career was not complete. He returned to the green and gold in 2003 at the World Rowing Cup III as a single sculler. Then in 2005 for the fourth time in his long national career he stepped back into the Australian quad scull, now with Craig Jones Chris Morgan and Trent Collins. In his last international campaign Day stroked the quad through a heat, repechage and semi to a fifth place in the B final for an overall eleventh placing at the 2005 World Rowing Championships in Gifu Japan.
