= Mykola Chupryna =

Ukrainian rower

Medal record

Men's rowing

Representing Soviet Union

World Rowing Championships
Gold medal – first place	1990 Tasmania	M4x
Gold medal – first place	1991 Vienna	M4x
Silver medal – second place	1985 Hazewinkel	M2x

Representing Ukraine

World Rowing Championships
Silver medal – second place	1993 Račice	M4x
Silver medal – second place	1994 Indianapolis	M4x

Mykola Mykolaiovych Chupryna (Ukrainian: Микола Миколайович Чуприна; born 4 June 1962) is a Ukrainian rower who was born in Kyiv.
