= Harald Faderbauer =

Austrian rower

Personal information
- Nationality: Austrian
- Born: 24 July 1966 (age 58); Vienna, Austria

Sport
- Sport: Rowing

Harald Faderbauer (born 24 July 1966) is an Austrian rower. He competed at the 1988 Summer Olympics and the 1992 Summer Olympics.
