= Kajetan Broniewski =

Polish rower (born 1963)

Medal record

Men's rowing

Representing Poland

Olympic Games
Bronze medal – third place	1992 Barcelona	Single sculls

Friendship Games
Bronze medal – third place	1984 Moscow	Double sculls

World Rowing Championships
Bronze medal – third place	1991 Vienna	Single sculls

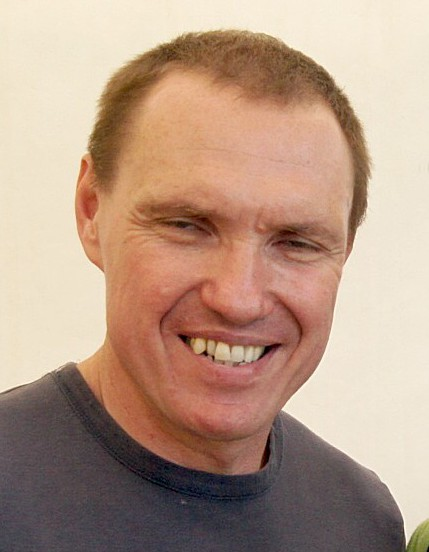
Shown in 2012

Kajetan Tomasz Broniewski (born 6 March 1963 in Zabrze) is a Polish rower.
