= Horst Nußbaumer =

Austrian rower

Personal information
- Nationality: Austrian
- Born: 13 June 1971 (age 54) Kirchdorf an der Krems, Austria

Sport
- Sport: Rowing

Horst Nußbaumer (born 13 June 1971) is an Austrian rower. He competed at the 1992 Summer Olympics, 1996 Summer Olympics and the 2000 Summer Olympics.

Since March 2025 he is the president of the Austrian Olympic Committee.
