= Melquiades Verduras =

Spanish rower

Personal information
- Nationality: Spanish
- Born: 24 October 1968 (age 56); Basauri, Basque Country, Spain

Sport
- Sport: Rowing

Melquiades Verduras Tascón (born 24 October 1968) is a Spanish rower. He competed at the 1992 Summer Olympics and the 1996 Summer Olympics.
