= Samuel Barathay =

French rower (born 1968)

Personal information
- Full name: Samuel René Louis Barathay
- Born: 1 June 1968 (age 58) Vinzier, France
Medal record
Men's rowing
Representing France
Olympic Games
| Bronze medal – third place | 1996 Atlanta | Double sculls |
World Championships
| Gold medal – first place | 1993 Račice | M2x |
| Bronze medal – third place | 1994 Indianapolis | M2x |

Samuel René Louis Barathay (born 1 June 1968, in Vinzier) is a French rower.
