= Fabrice LeClerc =

French rower

Personal information
- Nationality: French
- Born: 28 April 1968 (age 56); Nogent-sur-Seine, France

Sport
- Sport: Rowing

Fabrice LeClerc (born 28 April 1968) is a French rower. He competed at the 1992 Summer Olympics and the 1996 Summer Olympics.
