= 2000 New Year Honours =

British royal recognitions

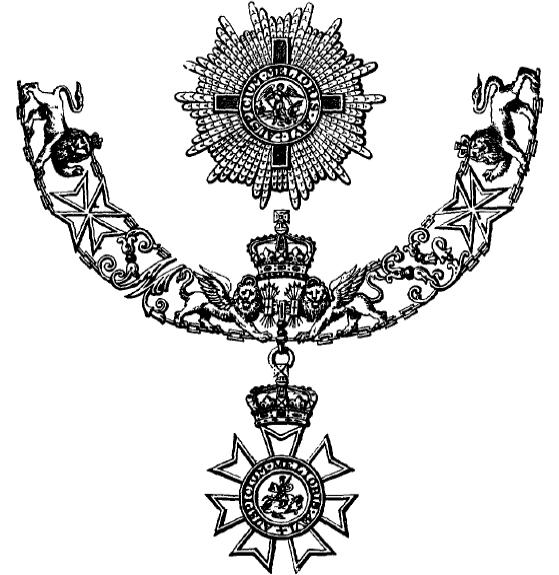
The insignia of the Grand Cross of the Order of St Michael and St George: Andrew Wood was awarded the Grand Cross in this Honours list.

The New Year Honours 2000 for the United Kingdom and New Zealand were announced on 31 December 1999, to celebrate the year passed and mark the beginning of 2000. The Honours list is a list of people who have been awarded one of the various orders, decorations, and medals of the United Kingdom. Honours are split into classes ("orders") and are graded to distinguish different degrees of achievement or service, most medals are not graded. The awards are presented to the recipient in one of several investiture ceremonies at Buckingham Palace throughout the year by the Sovereign or her designated representative. The Prince of Wales (now Charles III) and The Princess Royal deputised for The Queen.

The orders, medals and decorations are awarded by various honours committees which meet to discuss candidates identified by public or private bodies, by government departments or who are nominated by members of the public. Depending on their roles, those people selected by committee are submitted either to the prime minister, Secretary of State for Foreign and Commonwealth Affairs, or Secretary of State for Defence for their approval before being sent to the Sovereign for final approval. As the "fount of honour" the monarch remains the final arbiter for awards. In the case of certain orders such as the Order of the Garter and the Royal Victorian Order they remain at the personal discretion of the Queen.

The recipients of honours are displayed here as they were styled before their new honour, and arranged by honour, with classes (Knight, Knight Grand Cross, etc.) and then divisions (Military, Civil, etc.) as appropriate.

== United Kingdom of Great Britain and Northern Ireland ==
=== Life peers ===
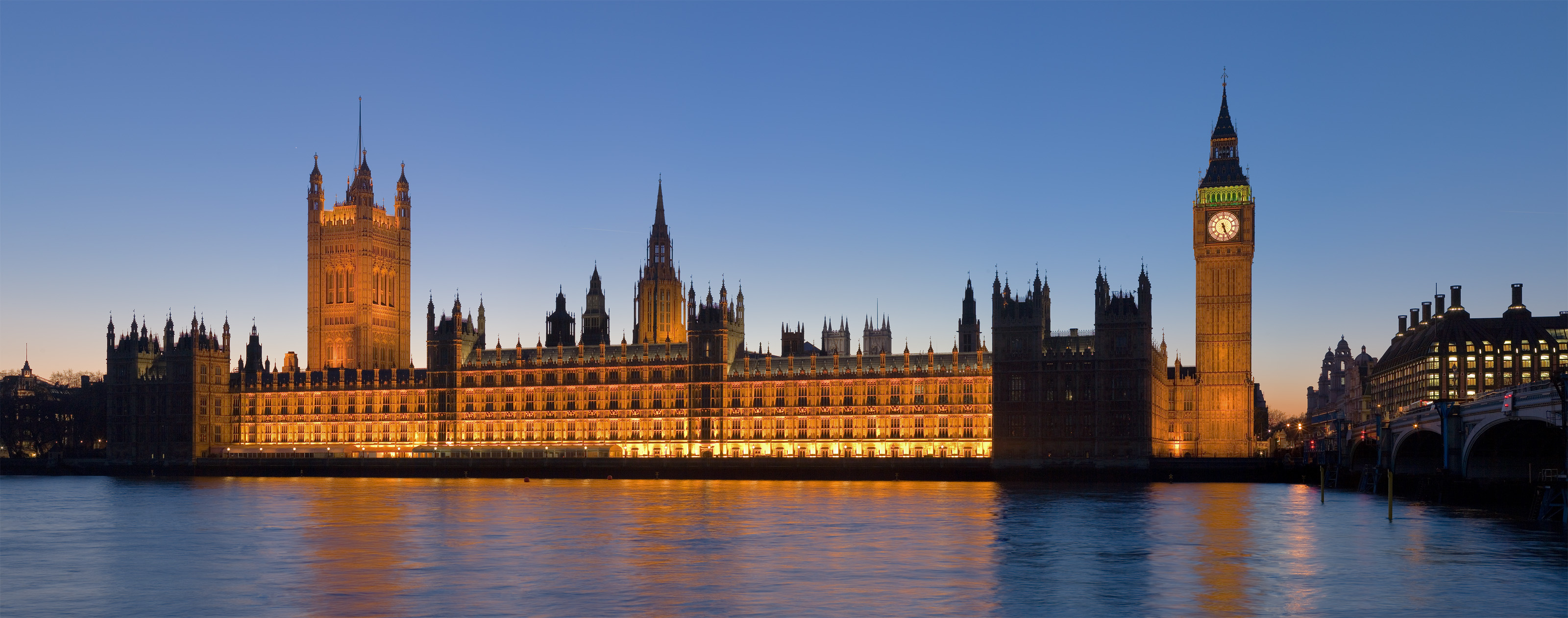
Life Peers are entitled to sit in the House of Lords situated within the Palace of Westminster.

In the 2000 New Year Honours list 6 people were made Life Peers through being made a Baron or Baroness.

- Sir John Birt, Director-General, BBC.
- The Right Honourable Sir Leon Brittan, QC, lately Vice-President, European Commission.
- Sally Greengross, Lady Greengross, OBE, Director-General, Age Concern.
- Joel Goodman Joffe, CBE, Chairman, OXFAM.
- Adam Hafejee Patel, Vice President, Blackburn Community Relations Council and Counsellor, Muslim Council of Britain.
- Sir Charles David Powell, KCMG, Director, Jardine Matheson Holdings.

=== Members of the Order of the Companions of Honour (CH) ===
The Order of the Companions of Honour is an order with 65 members who have been rewarded for outstanding achievements in the arts, literature, music, science, politics, industry or religion; three people were invested into the order in this list.

- Richard Hamilton, artist. For services to Art.
- Doris Lessing, writer. For services to Literature.
- The Reverend Prebendary Edward Chad Varah, CBE, for services to The Samaritans.

=== Knights Bachelor ===
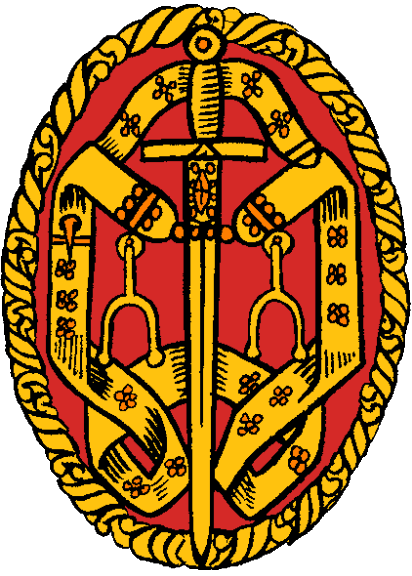
The insignia of a Knight Bachelor

A Knight Bachelor is the rank of a man who has been knighted by the monarch but not as a member of one of the organised Orders of Chivalry; 45 people were accorded this honour in this list.

- Professor Kurt George Matthew Mayer Alberti. For services to Diabetic Medicine.
- Professor John Evelyn Beringer, CBE, lately Chairman, Advisory Committee on Releases to the Environment. For services to Environmental Safety.
- Winfried Franz Wilhelm Bischoff, Chairman, Schroders plc. For services to Banking.
- Professor Malcolm Stanley Bradbury, CBE. For services to Literature.
- Richard Charles Nicholas Branson. For services to Entrepreneurship.
- John Brown. For services to Ship Design in the 20th Century.
- Chow Chung-Kong, Chief Executive, GKN Ltd. For services to Industry.
- Sean Thomas Connery, Actor. For services to Film Drama.
- Henry Cooper, OBE. For services to Boxing.
- Josias Cunningham, DL. For political and public service.
- ~~Alan Seymour Davies, JP, Headteacher, Copland Community School and Technology Centre, Brent, London. For services to Education.~~ (knighthood later annulled)
- His Honour Judge Rhys Everson Davies, QC, Recorder of Manchester. For services to the Criminal Justice System.
- Jeremy Dixon. For services to Architecture.
- John Stanley Evans, QPM, Chief Constable, Devon and Cornwall Constabulary. For services to the Police.
- Richard Anthony Foster, DL, Director, National Museums and Galleries on Merseyside. For services to Museums.
- Professor Royston Miles Goode, CBE, QC. For services to Academic Law.
- Gerald Henry Gordon, CBE, QC, lately Sheriff of Glasgow and Strathkelvin. For services to Scottish Law.
- John Alistair Graham. For services to the Parades Commission for Northern Ireland.
- Professor Martin Best Harris, CBE, DL, Vice-Chancellor, University of Manchester. For services to Higher Education.
- Walter William Herbert. For services to Polar Exploration.
- Professor Charles Antony Richard Hoare, FRS. For services to Education and to Computer Science.
- Peter Nevile Wake Jennings, CVO, lately Serjeant-at-Arms, House of Commons.
- Harry George Jones, CBE. For services to Local Government.
- John Desmond Patrick Keegan, OBE, Historian. For services to Military History.
- David Philip Lane, FRS, FRSE. For services to Medical Science, especially Cancer Research.
- Bruce Liddington, Headteacher, Northampton School for Boys. For services to Education.
- Michael Thomas Lyons, Chief Executive, Birmingham City Council. For services to Local Government.
- Professor Michael Gideon Marmot. For services to Epidemiology and Understanding Health Inequalities.
- Kenneth Duncan Morrison, CBE. For services to the Food Retail Industry.
- Stirling Craufurd Moss, OBE. For services to Motor Racing.
- Nicholas Harold Lloyd Ridley. For pioneering services to Cataract Surgery.
- Ian Robinson, Chief Executive, Scottish Power plc. For services to the Electricity Industry.
- Stephen Arthur Robson, CB, Director, Finance, Regulation and Industry, HM Treasury.
- Alan Walter Rudge, CBE, FRS. For services to Engineering Research and to Industry.
- Professor Alec Wesley Skempton. For services to Engineering.
- Martin Sorrell, Group Chief Executive, WPP Group. For services to the Communications Industry.
- John Stevens, QPM, Deputy Commissioner, Metropolitan Police. For services to the Police.
- Alan Michael Sugar. For services to the Home Computer and Electronics Industry.
- Professor John Kenneth Tavener, Composer. For services to Music.
- Professor Maurice Vincent Wilkes. For services to Computing.
- Michael Wilshaw, Headteacher St Bonaventure's School, Newham, London. For services to Education.
- Norman Wisdom, OBE. For services to entertainment.

Diplomatic and Overseas list

- The Honourable Judge Christopher William Bellamy. For services to the development of the Court of First Instance of the European Communities.
- John Peter Jens Jonas, CBE, General Director, Bavarian State Opera.
- Howard Stringer, Chairman and Chief Executive Officer, Sony Corporation of America.

=== The Most Honourable Order of the Bath ===
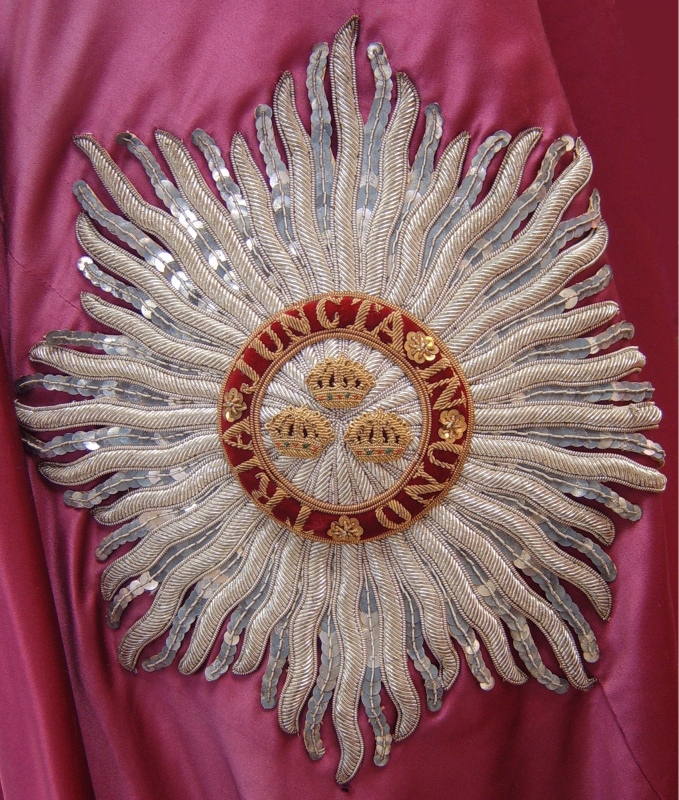
Representation of the star of the Order of the Bath (civil division).

The Most Honourable Order of the Bath is the fourth-most senior of the British Orders of Chivalry with three classes of member; 32 people were entered into the Order of the Bath in the 2000 New Years Honours List.

==== Knights Grand Cross (GCB) ====
Military division

Army

- General Sir Michael John Dawson Walker, KCB, CMG, CBE, ADC, General, late The Royal Anglian Regiment.

==== Knights Commander (KCB) ====
Military division

Navy

- Vice Admiral Paul Kenneth Haddacks
- Vice Admiral Alan William John West, DSC

Army

- Lt Gen Michael Alan Willcocks, CB, Late Royal Regiment of Artillery.

Air Force

- Air Marshal Christopher Charles Cotton Coville, CB, Royal Air Force.

Civil division

- Anthony Hilgrove Hammond, C.B., Q.C., H.M. Procurator General, Treasury Solicitor and Queen's Proctor.
- David Bruce Omand, Permanent Under-Secretary, Home Office.
- Richard John Packer, Permanent Secretary, Ministry of Agriculture, Fisheries and Food.

==== Companions (CB) ====
Military division

Navy

- Rear Admiral Andrew Bankes Gough
- Rear Admiral Simon Moore

Army

- The Rev Dr Victor Dobbin, MBE QHC, Royal Army Chaplains' Department.
- Maj Gen David John Malcolm Jenkins, CBE, late The Queen's Own Hussars.
- Maj Gen Andrew Robert Douglas Pringle, CBE Late The Royal Green Jackets.
- Maj Gen John George Reith, CBE Late The Parachute Regiment.

Air Force

- Air Vice-Marshal Peter William Henderson, MBE Royal Air Force.
- Air Vice-Marshal Philip Oliver Sturley, MBE Royal Air Force.
- Air Vice-Marshal John Hugh Thompson, Royal Air Force.

Civil division

- Henrietta Campbell, For Public Service. (Killinchy, Down)
- Edward William Frizzell, Lately Chief Executive, Scottish Prison Service, Scottish Executive. (Edinburgh)
- Norman Glass, Deputy Director, Public Services Directorate, HM Treasury. (Croydon, Surrey)
- David Holt, Director, Office for National Statistics. (Southampton, Hampshire)
- Catherine Elizabeth Johnston, Parliamentary Counsel, Office of the Parliamentary Counsel. (London, W4)
- Peter Robert Joyce, Inspector General and Chief Executive, The Insolvency Service, Department of Trade and Industry. (Croydon, Surrey)
- Leigh Warren Lewis, Chief Executive, Employment Service, Department for Education and Employment. (Watford, Hertfordshire)
- Richard Guy Moberly Manning, Director General (Resources), Department for International Development. (Esher, Surrey)
- David John Normington, Director general for Schools, Department for Education and Employment. (Woldingham, Surrey)
- Mrs Diane Susan Phillips, Director, Roads and Traffic Directorate, Department of the Environment, Transport and the Regions. (Weybridge, Surrey)
- Simon Henry Martin Ricketts, Lately Grade 3, Ministry of Defence. (London)
- Marianne Teresa Neville-Rolfe, Lately Regional Director, Government Office for the North West, Department of Trade and Industry. (Congleton, Cheshire)
- Peter John Small, For public service. (Bangor, Down)
- David Stanton, Divisional Director, Department of Social Security. (Richmond, Surrey)
- Frederick John Alford Warne, Director, Organised and International Crime Directorate, Home Office. (Bromley, Kent)

=== The Most Distinguished Order of Saint Michael and Saint George ===
Representation of the star of a Knight or Dame Grand Cross

The Most Distinguished Order of St Michael and St George is an order of chivalry used to honour individuals who have rendered important services in relation to Commonwealth or foreign nations; 16 people were appointed members of the order in the list.

==== Knights Grand Cross (GCMG) ====
Diplomatic division

- Sir Andrew Marley Wood, KCMG, HM Ambassador, Moscow.

==== Knights Commander (KCMG) ====
Diplomatic division

- David Brian Carleton Logan, CMG HM Ambassador, Ankara.
- Thomas Legh Richardson, CMG HM Ambassador, Rome.
- Robert Peter Wilson, For services to British interests overseas.

==== Companions (CMG) ====
Diplomatic division

- Michael Edgar Cook, High Commissioner, Kampala.
- Robert Davies, Director, The Prince of Wales's Business Leaders' Forum.
- Maj Gen Karol John Drewienkiewicz, CB Lately chief of Operations, OSCE Kosovo. Verification Mission.
- Victor Joseph Henderson, HM Ambassador, Sana'a.
- Alan Richmond Ingle, Head, Joint Diplomatic Service Management Office, Brussels.
- Ann Walford Lewis, Counsellor, Foreign and Commonwealth Office.
- Ian Linden, Executive director, Catholic Institute for International Relations.
- Stephen Thomas Nash, HM Ambassador, Riga.
- Robert Ramsay, Lately Director-General, European Parliament.
- Professor Helen Sarah Wallace, For services to the development of European studies.
- Peter John Westmacott, LVO Director, Foreign and Commonwealth Office.
- Julian Paul Geoffrey Wiseman, Counsellor, Foreign and Commonwealth Office.

=== Royal Victorian Order ===
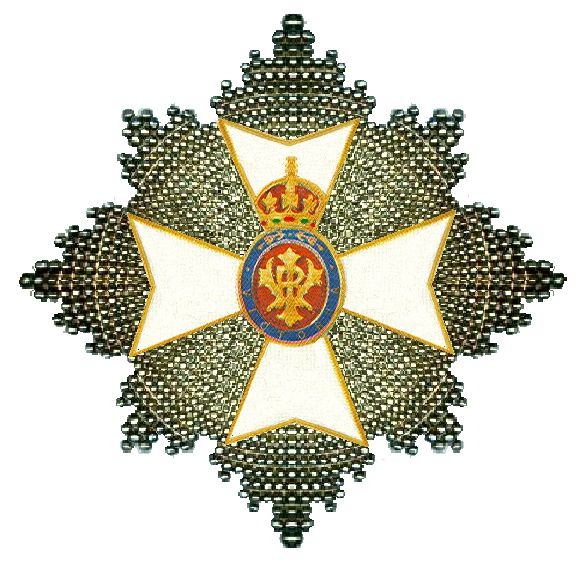
Breast Star of the Grand Cross of the Royal Victorian Order

The Royal Victorian Order is a dynastic order of knighthood and a house order of chivalry recognising distinguished personal service to the reigning monarch of the Commonwealth realms; admission remains in the personal gift of the monarch. In the 2000 New Years Honours list 28 people were entered into the four hierarchical grades of the order as well as 10 people awarded the Royal Victorian Medal.

==== Knights Commander (KCVO) ====
- Anthony James Merifield, CB Ceremonial Officer, Cabinet Office.

==== Commanders (CVO) ====
- Surgeon Rear Admiral Ian Lawrence Jenkins, Overseas Tour Doctor to The Prince of Wales.
- The Hon Sir Lachlan Hector Charles Maclean, Bt Lately Adjutant, Royal Company of Archers.
- The Hon Dame Roma Flinders Mitchell, DBE AC, lately Governor of South Australia.
- Ronald Michael Woodhouse, Trustee, The Prince's Trust.

==== Lieutenants (LVO) ====
- Deborah Jean Bull, Secretary to the UK Trustees, The Duke of Edinburgh's Commonwealth Study Conferences.
- Simon Mark Corbett, Lately HSBC Investment Management.
- Sheila Loraine, Lady De Bellaigue, MVO Registrar, Royal Archives, Windsor Castle.
- Mrs Emma Joy Kitchener-Fellowes, Lady in Waiting to Princess Michael of Kent.
- Col Iain Alexander Ferguson, OBE Lately Vice Chairman and Director, Royal Tournament.
- David Alan Grapes, Farm Consultant to Sandringham Estate and the Royal Farms, Windsor.
- Superintendent Colin Leslie Haywood-Trimming, MVO Lately Royalty Protection Department, Metropolitan Police.
- Graham Arthur James Walker, Lately Treasurer, The Royal Jubilee Trusts and The Prince's Trust.

==== Members (MVO) ====
- Inspector Trevor Christopher Raymond Bettles, Royalty Protection Department, Metropolitan Police.
- Mrs Patricia Anne Copeman, Bookshop manager, St. George's Chapel, Windsor Castle.
- Terence Edwin Duggan, Pilot, The Queen's Helicopter Flight.
- Robert Gray Hamilton, RVM Yeoman of the Royal Pantries, Royal Household.
- Mark James Lane, Head Gardener, Buckingham Palace.
- Cdr John Patrick Lavery, Royal Navy, lately Equerry to The Prince of Wales.
- Mrs Marilyn Jean Porter, Assistant Clerk to the Lieutenancy, Dorset.
- Jeremy Patrick Bagwell Purefoy, Insignia Clerk, Central Chancery of the Orders of Knighthood.
- Charlette Helen Robinson, Administrator, Privy Purse Office.
- Clare Margaret Sillars, Information Officer, Press Office, Buckingham Palace.
- Alan John Smith, Lately The Prince's Trust.
- Mrs Jacqueline Mary Stevens, Secretary to the Comptroller to Queen Elizabeth The Queen Mother.
- Inspector Andrew Wallace Thomlinson, Royalty Protection Department, Metropolitan Police.
- Peter Ludlow Walford, Lately Royal Household Liaison Officer, Rover Cars.
- Rosemary Ward, Senior assistant chief Accountant, Royal Household.

==== Royal Victorian Medal (RVM) ====
RVM (bar)

- Ronald John Lewis, RVM Travelling Yeoman, Household of The Prince of Wales.

RVM

- Malcolm Joseph Bull, Craftsman Fitter, Crown Estate, Windsor.
- Brian James D'Arcy, Chief Exhibitor, The Jewel House, HM Tower of London.
- Leonard Byron Eldridge, Building Supervisor, Property Section, Buckingham Palace.
- Nigel George Goldsmith, Deputy assistant to the Master of the Household, 'C' Branch.
- Mrs Doris Gay Hamilton, Housekeeper, Frogmore House, Windsor.
- Mrs Dora Ann Holt, Daily Lady, Windsor Castle.
- David Edward Key, Chauffeur to The Duke of Edinburgh.
- Hilary Sybil Moyses, Lately Senior Housemaid, Windsor Castle.
- Brian Alan Ernest Stanley, Stud Groom, Royal Paddocks, Hampton Court.

=== The Most Excellent Order of the British Empire ===
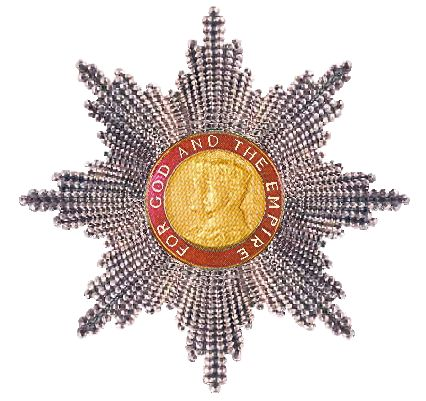
Grand Cross's star of the Order of the British Empire

The Most Excellent Order of the British Empire is an order of chivalry comprising five classes in civil and military divisions. It is the junior of the British orders of chivalry, and the largest, with over 100,000 living members worldwide. The highest two ranks of the order, the Knight/Dame Grand Cross and Knight/Dame Commander, admit an individual into knighthood or damehood automatically allowing the recipient to use the title Sir or Dame.

==== Knights Commander (KBE) ====
A Knight Commander is the second most senior grade in the Order of the British Empire. One person was made a Knight Commander in the military division and three in the civil division in the 2000 New Years Honour list and are entitled to use the post-nominals KBE.

Military division

- Air Marshal Peter Coulson Norriss, CB, AFC Royal Air Force

Civil division

- Richard Walter John, Earl of Dalkeith, D.L., Millennium Commissioner. For services to the Millennium Celebrations.

Diplomatic and Overseas list

- Duncan Robin Carmichael Christopher, CMG, HM Ambassador, Jakarta.
- Professor Andrew John Wiles, F.R.S., for services to science.

==== Dames Commander (DBE) ====
A Dame Commander is the second most senior grade in the Order of the British Empire. Nine people were made a Dame Commander in the civil division in the 2000 New Years Honour list and are entitled to use the post-nominals DBE.

Civil division

- Shirley Bassey, CBE, Singer. For services to Entertainment. (London, W1M)
- Beulah Rosemary Bewley. For services to the Advancement of Women in Medicine. (London, SW1W)
- Professor Jill Macleod Clark. For services to Nursing Education. (London, SE1)
- Lorna Elizabeth Fox Muirhead, President of the Royal College of Midwives. For services to Midwifery. (Liverpool, Merseyside)
- Marlene Robottom, Headteacher, Mulberry School for Girls, Tower Hamlets, London. For services to Education. (Ilford, Essex)
- The Honourable Miriam Louisa Rothschild, CBE, FRS. For services to Nature Conservation and Biochemical Research. (Peterborough, Cambridgeshire)
- Stephanie Shirley, OBE. For services to the Information Technology Industry. (Henley on Thames, Oxfordshire)
- Dorothy Tutin, CBE, Actress. For services to Drama. (London, SW7)
- Professor Patricia Morgan-Webb, Chief Executive, New College, Nottingham. For services to Further Education. (Sutton Coldfield, West Midlands)

Diplomatic and Overseas list

- Julie Elizabeth Andrews, for services to acting and entertainment.
- Elizabeth Rosemond Taylor, for services to acting and charity.

==== Commanders (CBE) ====
Commanders of the Order of the British Empire (military division) are in the third tier of the Order. The recipients in the 2000 list are as follows:

Military division
Navy

- Commodore John Rowland Hance, ADC Royal Navy.
- Capt Robert Milligan Turner, Royal Navy.
- Capt Keith Watterson, Royal Navy.

Army

- Col Christopher Charles Brown, Late Royal Regiment of Artillery.
- Brig Timothy Cross, Late The Royal Logistic Corps.
- Brig William Raoul Rollo, Late The Blues and Royals.
- Col Colin William Tadier, Late Royal Regiment of Artillery.
- Col Michael O'Donoghue, Late Army Air Corps.
- Col David Hamilton Rex Stephenson, Late The Light Infantry.
- Brig Christopher Raymond Winfield, Late Royal Army Medical Corps.

Air Force

- Air Commodore Nigel James Day, Royal Air Force.

Civil division

- Victor Adebowale. For services to the New Deal Task Force and to Unemployed and Homeless People. (London, W1R)
- Brian Alexander. For services to the Water Industry and to Regeneration in North West England. (Warrington, Cheshire)
- Gordon Alexander Anderson, Lately Chairman, Trustee Savings Bank Bank Scotland. For services to the Financial Sector in Scotland. (Bearsden, Dunbartonshire)
- Sarah Anderson, Assessor. For services to Training and Enterprise. (London, SW1V)
- Professor John Albert Andrews, Chief Executive, Welsh Funding Councils. For services to Education. (Aberystwyth, Ceredigion)
- Professor John Richard Ashton, Regional Director of Public Health, NHS Executive, Department of Health. (Liverpool, Merseyside)
- Professor David Tennent Baird, Research Professor in Reproductive Endocrinology. For services to Obstetrics and Gynaecology. (Edinburgh)
- Patricia Mary Barker, Author. For services to Literature. (London, SW10)
- Professor Robert Francis Boucher, Principal and Vice-Chancellor, UMIST. For services to Engineering Research, Industry and Education. (Sheffield, South Yorkshire)
- Robin Alistair Bradley. For services to the Defence Industry. (Berkshire)
- Winifred Mary Brancker, OBE. For services to Animal Health and Welfare to Women in the Veterinary Profession. (Sutton Coldfield, West Midlands)
- Frank Gordon Burns, Chief Executive, Wirral Hospitals NHS Trust. For services to Health Care. (Wirral)
- Humphrey McGuire Burton, Writer and Broadcaster. For services to Music and Broadcasting. (London, W14)
- Anthony John Peter Butler, QPM Chief Constable, Gloucestershire Constabulary. For services to the Police. (Huntley, Gloucestershire)
- Celia Mary Cameron, Joint Leader, Norfolk County Council. For services to Norfolk and to Local Government. (Norwich, Norfolk)
- Professor Michael Gilbert Clarke, Deputy Chair, Local Government Commission for England. For services to Local Government. (Worcester, Worcestershire)
- Kenneth Cook, Headteacher, Fir Vale School, Sheffield, South Yorkshire. For services to Education. (Sheffield, South Yorkshire)
- John Newton Cooper. For services to the Motor Industry. (Rustington, West Sussex)
- Matthew Martin Corcoran, Head, VAT Operations, HM Board of Customs and Excise. (Chester, Cheshire)
- John Richard Cowan, Head, Beef and Sheep Division, Ministry of Agriculture, Fisheries and Food. (Tunbridge Wells, Kent)
- Professor Thomas Rodford Cox, Professor of Organisational Psychology, University of Nottingham. For services to Occupational Health. (Nottingham, Nottinghamshire)
- Richard Whalley Anthony Curtis, MBE, Writer. For services to Television and Film Comedy and to Comic Relief. (London, W11)
- Paul Wilson Daniel, Music Director, English National Opera. For services to Music. (London, WC2N)
- Laura Jane Davies, MBE. For services to Women's Golf. (Chertsey, Surrey)
- Maureen Patricia Davies, Teacher, St. Sebastian's Primary School, Liverpool. For services to Education. (Liverpool, Merseyside)
- Michael Jeremy Pugh Davies, Architect. For services to the Millennium Dome. (London)
- Brian Elliot Davis, Chief Executive, Nationwide Building Society. For services to the Building Society Industry. (Nr Hungerford, Berkshire)
- Susan Jean Davis, Deputy Chair, Advantage West Midlands. For services to the community in the West Midlands. (Telford, Shropshire)
- Joyce Blair Deans, MBE. For services to the Construction Industry. (Bearsden, Glasgow)
- Andrew Maule Dewar-Durie, DL Lately Chairman, Allied Distillers Ltd. For services to the Drinks Industry. (Croftamie, Stirling and Falkirk)
- Professor Charles Syrett Farrell Easmon. For services to Medical Education and Training. (Surbiton, Surrey)
- Malcolm Eastwood, QFSM Chief Fire Officer. For services to the Hampshire Fire and Rescue Service. (Eastleigh, Hampshire)
- Anne Marie Fagan, Headteacher, John Ogilvie High School, Hamilton. For services to Education Standards in Scotland. (Hamilton, Lanarkshire)
- Kathleen Margaret Fairweather, H.M. Chief Inspector of Schools, Scottish Executive. (Pencaitland, East Lothian)
- Joseph Charles Farman, OBE. For services to Atmospheric Science. (Cambridge, Cambridgeshire)
- Professor Robin Charles Fraser. For services to Medical Audit and Assessment. (Leicester, Leicestershire)
- Breidge Marie Gadd. For services to Probation. (Belfast)
- Peter Oliver Gershon, Lately Managing Director, Marconi Electronic Systems. For services to Industry. (Amersham, Buckinghamshire)
- John Ernest Gibbons, Chief Architect, Scottish Executive. (Pathhead, Midlothian)
- George Gowans Gray. For services to Serco and to the Outsourcing Industry. (Weybridge, Surrey)
- Professor Susan Adele Greenfield. For services to the Public Understanding of Science. (Oxford, Oxfordshire)
- John Gilbert Dickie Grieve, QPM, Deputy Assistant Commissioner, Metropolitan Police. For services to the Police. (Bromley, Kent)
- Philip Hammersley, OBE. For services to Health Care. (Near Lutterworth, Leicestershire)
- Charles Brian Handy. For services to Personnel Management Education and Practice. (London, SW15)
- Brian Hanna. For services to Local Government. (Lisburn, Antrim)
- David Henry Arnold Harrison. For services to the Export Guarantees Advisory Council. (West Horsley, Surrey)
- Dr Agnes Hauck, Consultant Psychiatrist. For services to Children's Mental Health. (Leicester, Leicestershire)
- Iona Caroline Heath, General Medical Practitioner, London. For services to the Care of Elderly People. (London, N1)
- Thomas Jeffrey Hemsley, Singer and Teacher. For services to Music. (London, N6)
- Professor Neil Hood, Professor of Business Policy, University of Strathclyde. For services to Business and Economic Development. (Hamilton, Lanarkshire)
- Anne Jarvie, Chief Nursing Officer for Scotland. For services to Health Care. (Lenzie, Dunbartonshire)
- Martin Jay, Managing Director and Chief Executive, Vosper Thornycroft. For services to the Defence and Ship Building Industries. (Nr Alresford, Hampshire)
- David John Jeffery, Lately Chief Executive, Port of London Authority. For services to the Ports Industry. (Frome, Somerset)
- Julie Hartley-Jones. For services to Renal Nursing. (Long Crendon, Buckinghamshire)
- Linda Mary Jones, Head, Women's Policy Group, Prison Service, Home Office. (Hallaton, Leicestershire)
- Robert Brinley Jones, President, National Library of Wales. For services to Welsh Education and Culture. (Llanwrda, Carmarthenshire)
- Liz Kelly. For services to combating violence against women and children. (London, N16)
- Malcolm William Kennedy, Chairman, BP Power Ltd. For services to Export to Developing Markets. (Newcastle upon Tyne, Tyne and Wear)
- David Matthew Doyne Keogh, Chief Salvage and Mooring Officer, Ministry of Defence. (Yealmpton, Devon)
- Mohammed Arif Khan, Legal Director, Consumer Affairs, Office of Fair Trading, Department of Trade and Industry. (Richmond, Surrey)
- Stephen Leigh Kingon, For services to Economic Development.
- Denise Patricia Kingsmill, Deputy Chairman, Monopolies and Mergers Commission. For services to Competition and Employment Law. (London, W11)
- Susan Elizabeth Knibbs. For services to People with Disabilities. (London, SW19)
- Michael Kron, Head, Drafting Services, Lord Chancellor's Department. (London, W4)
- Sally Kuenssberg, Chairman, Scottish Children's Reporter Administration. For services to Child Welfare and Justice. (Glasgow)
- Roger Froome Laughton. For services to Regional Broadcasting. (Richmond, Surrey)
- Timothy Robin Lawson, Chairman, Barnardo's. For services to Young People. (Canterbury, Kent)
- Clive William Leach, Chairman, Leeds Training and Enterprise Council. For services to Training and Education. (Tadcaster, North Yorkshire)
- Professor Christopher John Leaver, FRS, FRSE. For services to Plant Sciences. Oxford, Oxfordshire
- William Ian Liddell, Chief Design Engineer. For services to the Millennium Dome. (Bath, Somerset)
- Professor Malcolm Sim Longair. For services to Astronomy and Cosmology. (Cambridge, Cambridgeshire)
- Colin Mackenzie Low. For services to the Royal National Institute for the Blind and to Disabled People's Rights. (London, E8)
- Bashir Ahmed Maan, DL. For services to Race Relations and to the community in Scotland. (Glasgow)
- Julian Markham, Chairman, Court of Governors, London Institute. For services to Higher Education. (Stanmore, Middlesex)
- Herbert William Massie, OBE. For services to The National Disability Council and the Royal Association for Disability and Rehabilitation. (London, N17)
- Ralph Anthony Jeffrey Mayer, Chief Executive, Housing Corporation. For services to Social Housing. (Twickenham, Middlesex)
- Robert Lewis Maynard, Senior Medical Officer, Department of Health. (Nr Salisbury, Wiltshire)
- John Charles Mayo, Finance Director, Marconi plc. For services to Industry. (Northwood, Middlesex)
- Ian Russell McEwan, Author. For services to literature. (London)
- Edward Forrester McIntyre, Principal, Birmingham College of Food, Tourism and Creative Studies. For services to Further and Higher Education. (Solihull, West Midlands)
- The Rev Professor John McManners. For services to Ecclesiastical History.
- Elizabeth Jane Meek, Head, Greater London Authority Division, Government Office for London, Department of the Environment, Transport and the Regions. (London, SW6)
- William Minto, OBE, DL, Leader, Cumbria County Council. For services to the community in Cumbria and North West England. (Workington, Cumbria)
- Donald Charles Peter Mitchell, Chairman, Britten Estate Ltd and Trustee, Britten-Pears Foundation. For services to Music Scholarship. (London, WC1E)
- Stephanie Gladys Monk (Schwetz), Group Human Resources Director, Granada Group plc. For services to Industry.
- Peter Alan George Morphew, QFSM, H.M. Senior Inspector of Fire Services, Home Office. (Eastbourne, East Sussex)
- Rama Warren Nand-Lal, Lately Chairman of Governors, Swindon College, Wiltshire. For services to Further Education and Training. (Tavistock, Devon)
- Barbara Patricia Newman, Chief Commoner. For services to the City of London. (London, EC2Y)
- Declan Gerard O'Farrell, Chief Executive, Metroline. For services to Business in London. (Kings Langley, Hertfordshire)
- Samuel Roy Oldham, Leader of Tameside Metropolitan Borough Council. For services to Local Government. (Mottram-in-Longdendale)
- Dennis James O'Neill, Tenor. For services to Opera. (Cardiff)
- Ava Marilyn Sturridge-Packer, Headteacher, St. Mary's Primary School, Birmingham. For services to Education. (Sutton Coldfield, West Midlands)
- Michael Edward Palin, Writer and Actor. For services to Television Drama and Travel Documentaries. (London, NW5)
- Romano Roland Paoletti, Head of Architecture and Station Design, Jubilee Line Extension. For services to Architecture. (London, E1)
- Frances Catherine Partridge, Writer. For services to Literature. (London, SW1X)
- Kenneth Martin Pascoe, Grade 5, Employment Service, Department for Education and Employment. (Bristol)
- David Petch, Lately Deputy Chief, Assessments Staff, Cabinet Office. (London)
- Martin Charles Pipe, Trainer. For services to Horse Racing. (Wellington, Somerset)
- The Hon Sir Jonathon Espie Porritt, Bt. For services to Environmental Protection. (Cheltenham, Gloucestershire)
- John Richard Prosser. For services to Export. (Nr Billingshurst, West Sussex)
- Stewart Peter Purvis, Chief Executive, Independent Television News Ltd. For services to Broadcast Journalism. (London, WC1X)
- Heather Victoria Rabbatts, Chief Executive, London Borough of Lambeth. For services to Local Government. (London, N5)
- Rosemary Anne Radcliffe, Chief Economist, PricewaterhouseCoopers. For services to Business Competitiveness. (London, SW6)
- Kathleen Jessie Raine. For services to Literature. (London, SW3)
- Peter Robert Read. For services to the Association of the British Pharmaceutical Industry. (Wargrave, Berkshire)
- Gail Ruth Rebuck, Chairman and Chief Executive, The Random House Group Ltd. For services to Publishing.
- Jane Barbara Reed. For services to Publishing and to the Broadcasting Industry. (London, E1)
- David Nicholas Reilly, Corporate Vice President, General Motors Corporation. For services to the Automotive Industry. (Woburn, Buckinghamshire)
- Professor John David Rhodes, OBE. For services to Engineering Research and to Industry. (Ilkley, West Yorkshire)
- Ian Carl Ritchie. For services to Architecture. (London, E14)
- Michael John Rouse, Chief Drinking Water Inspector, Department of the Environment, Transport and the Regions. (Oxford, Oxfordshire)
- Angela Sarkis, Chief Executive, Church Urban Fund. For services to the Alleviation of Poverty. (Harrow, Middlesex)
- Rosalind Joy Savill, Director, Wallace Collection. For services to the Study of Ceramics. (London, NW1)
- Professor Crispian Scully. For services to Dental Patient Care, especially those with Special Needs. (Chorley Wood, Hertfordshire)
- Richard Alan Shepherd, Chef and Restaurateur. For services to the Catering Industry. (London, W5)
- Norman Alan Simmons. For services to the Promotion of Food Safety. (Potters Bar, Hertfordshire)
- Karamjit S'ukhminder Singh. For services to the Administration of Justice. (Coventry, West Midlands)
- Richard Sydney William Smith, Editor, British Medical Journal. For services to Medical Journalism. (London, SW4)
- David Stathers, Head, Policy Development, Boots The Chemist Ltd. For services to retail property and planning. (Nottingham, Nottinghamshire)
- Barbara Mary Stocking, Regional Director, NHS Executive, Department of Health. (Oxford, Oxfordshire)
- Gordon Caleb Summerfield, Chief Executive, Unigate European Food. For services to the Food and Dairy Processing Industry. (Reading, Berkshire)
- Professor Barry Emanuel Supple, Director, Leverhulme Trust. For services to Economic History. (Cambridgeshire)
- David Malcolm Thomas. For services to the Catering and Leisure Industries. (Oxshott, Surrey)
- Francis Daley Thompson, MBE. For services to Athletics. (London, SW6)
- Richard William Thornhill, Assistant Solicitor, H.M. Board of Inland Revenue. (Hampton, Middlesex)
- Alan Turner, Programme Director, Combat Support Systems, Ministry of Defence. (Great Brickhill, Buckinghamshire)
- Professor Robert Kerry Turner. For services to Sustainable Development. (Norwich, Norfolk)
- Harriet Mary Walter, Actress. For services to Drama. (London, SW1Y)
- George Edward Watkins, Chairman and Managing Director, Conoco Ltd. For services to the Oil and Gas Industry. (Aberdeen)
- Douglas Weston, Director of Projects. For services to the Millennium Commission. (Chalfont St. Giles, Buckinghamshire)
- Benjamin Charles George Whitaker, for services to Human Rights and to the Voluntary Sector. (London, NW3)
- Anna Maria White, Headteacher, The Ridings School, Halifax, West Yorkshire. For services to Education. (Bury, Lancashire)
- Michael Richard Whitlam. For services to the Voluntary Sector. (Uxbridge, Middlesex)
- Josephine Williams. For services to Social Services in Cheshire. (Nantwich, Cheshire)
- Brian Anthony Wilson, Head of Establishments, House of Commons. (St Leonards on Sea, East Sussex)
- Anne Wood. For services to Children's Broadcasting. (Nr Tewkesbury, Gloucestershire)
- John Yard, Director, Business and Management Services Division, H.M. Board of Inland Revenue. (Purley, Surrey)
- The Rt Rev David Nigel de Lorentz Young, Lately Bishop of Ripon. For services to the Church of England and to Education. (Lancaster, Lancashire)

Diplomatic and Overseas list

- Michael John Aaronson, Director, Save the Children Fund.
- Jonathan Theodore Starmer Fenby, For services to journalism.
- Martin John Griffiths, For services to international humanitarian assistance.
- David George Heard, OBE For services to the oil industry and the British community in Abu Dhabi.
- Lindsay Harwood Owen-Jones, For services to British interests, France.
- David Wayne Marsh, For services to Anglo-German relations.
- David George Moir, For services to British financial interests overseas.
- Hella Henrietta Pick, For services to journalism.
- Colonel John Joseph Porral, OBE, ED, JP. For community service, Gibraltar.
- Alistair Macaulay Stephen, For services to aviation engineering.
- Dr James Roland Williams, For services to British-Australian relations.
- Donald James Woods, For services to human rights.

==== Officers (OBE) ====
Officers of the Order of the British Empire (military division) are in the fourth tier of the Order. The recipients in the 2000 list are as follows:

Military division
Navy

- Cdr Richard John Demetrious Barker, Royal Navy.
- Cdr The Hon Michael Charles Nicholas Cochrane, Royal Navy.
- Cdr Thomas Rolf Herman, Royal Navy.
- Cdr James Howard Broadbent, Royal Navy.
- Cdr Herbert David Hume Elkington, Royal Naval Reserve.
- Cdr Nicholas Richard Edmund Harrap, Royal Navy.
- Cdr David James Lye, Royal Navy.
- Cdr John Edward Vicary Madgwick, Royal Navy.
- Acting Cdr Keith Sajiv Manchanda, MBE Royal Navy.
- Cdr Andrew Lennox McFarlane, Royal Navy.
- Maj Christopher Ralph Scott, Royal Marines.
- Cdr Robert Benjamin Stone, Royal Navy.

Army

- Lt Col Ian Charles Alexander, The Royal Logistic Corps.
- Lt Col Robin Charles Lucas Clifford, MBE The Royal Dragoon Guards.
- Lt Col Sean Dennis Crane, The Royal Gurkha Rifles.
- Lt Col Geoffrey Andrew Nield, Corps of Royal Engineers.
- Lt Col Jonathan James Powe, The King's Royal Hussars.
- Lt Col Jeremy Francis Rowan, Royal Army Medical Corps.
- Lt Col Charles Randle Montagu Stagg, The Royal Scots Dragoon Guards.
- Lt Col Glyn Taylor, Corps of Royal Engineers.
- Lt Col Richard Lawson Barrons, MBE Royal Regiment of Artillery.
- Acting Col Christopher David Anthony Blessington, Sussex Army Cadet Force.
- Lt Col Geoffrey James Cary, Royal Corps of Signals.
- Lt Col Gavin Allan Douglas, The Argyll and Sutherland Highlanders.
- Lt Col David Charles Eccles, Royal Tank Regiment.
- Lt Col John Nigel Taylor-Firth, Royal Tank Regiment, Territorial Army.
- Lt Col William John Heminsley, Corps of Royal Engineers.
- Lt Col Anthony David Knyvett, Royal Regiment of Artillery.
- Lt Col Alexander James Elton Malcolm, Welsh Guards.
- Lt Col Timothy Clive Reginald Moore, Adjutant General's Corps.
- Lt Col Philip Mark Naylor, Corps of Royal Engineers.
- Lt Col John Ronald William Pullinger, The Parachute Regiment.
- Lt Col Julian Guy Younge Radcliffe, TD The Royal Yeomanry, Territorial Army.
- Lt Col Matthew Adam Straker, The Light Dragoons.
- Lt Col Richard Harvey Williams, Corps of Royal Engineers.
- Lt Col Anthony Workman, Corps of Royal Electrical and Mechanical Engineers.

Air Force

- Wing Cdr Carl William Dixon, MBE Royal Air Force.
- Wing Cdr Robert Ian Elliott, Royal Air Force.
- Wing Cdr Ian David Teakle, Royal Air Force.
- Wing Cdr Graham Alan Wright, Royal Air Force.
- Wing Cdr George Albert Baber, Royal Air Force.
- Wing Cdr Leslie Garside-Beattie, Royal Air Force.
- Wing Cdr John George Darrant, Royal Air Force Volunteer Reserve.
- Wing Cdr Alan John Mawby, Royal Air Force.
- Wing Cdr Simon Charles Meade, Royal Air Force.
- Wing Cdr Christine Julie Oxland, Royal Air Force.
- Group Capt Peter William Rycroft, Royal Air Force.
- Wing Cdr Barry Smith, Royal Air Force.
- Wing Cdr Julian Alexander Young, Royal Air Force.

Civil division

Officers of the Order of the British Empire (civil division) are in the fourth tier of the Order. The recipients in the 2000 list are as follows:

- Mrs Sheila Ruth Abrahams, JP. For services to the administration of justice in Inner London. (London, SW3)
- Bernard Francis Ainsworth. For services to the Millennium Dome. (Huddersfield, West Yorkshire)
- Alistair Grant Aitken, Team Leader, Qualifications for Work Team, Scottish Executive. (Currie, Midlothian)
- Christabel Jane Albery, Lately London Film Commissioner. For services to the Film Industry. (London, W11)
- John Allen. For services to Secondary Education. (Belfast)
- William Ronald Allen. For services to Dentistry and to the British Dental Association. (Braintree, Essex)
- Mrs Doris Martyna Ansari, Leader, Cornwall County Council. For services to the community in Cornwall. (Truro, Cornwall)
- Mrs Hilary Margaret Anslow, Principal, King George V College, Southport. For services to Further Education. (Preston, Lancashire)
- Gary Armstrong. For services to Rugby Union Football.
- William James Armstrong. For services to Rural Development. (Limavady, Londonderry)
- Mrs Jennifer Rose Arwas, Headteacher, Lea Infant School, Slough, Berkshire. For services to Education. (Maidenhead, Berkshire)
- Jacques Sylvian Astruc, Underwriting Manager, Export Credit Guarantee Department, Department of Trade and Industry. (London, N12)
- Mrs Dawn Austwick, Project Director. For services to the Tate Gallery of Modern Art. (London, N16)
- Joan, Lady Bader. For services to disabled people. (Newbury, Berkshire)
- Kenneth John Bain, Lately Headmaster, Purcell School of Music, Hertfordshire. For services to Specialist Music Education. (Bridport, Dorset)
- Professor Janet Mary Bainbridge. For services to the Promotion of Science and Technology. (Middlesbrough, North Yorkshire)
- Mrs Helen Ball, Headteacher, St. John The Evangelist Primary School, Clevedon, Somerset. For services to Education. (Bristol, Somerset)
- William Barber, Rector, Lossiemouth High School. For services to Secondary Education. (Forres, Moray)
- Liz Bargh. For services to Women in the workforce. (King's Lynn, Norfolk)
- Professor Eileen Vartan Barker. For services to INFORM. (Wembley, Middlesex)
- Peter Barker, Member, Disabled Persons' Transport Advisory Committee. For services to the Mobility of Disabled People. (Tunbridge Wells, Kent)
- Ian Beales, Director, Bristol Evening Post and Press Ltd. For services to the Regional Newspaper Industry. (Stonehouse, Gloucestershire)
- Professor Eric Kirkland Beatty, MBE. For services to Economic Development. (Newtownabbey, Antrim)
- Susan Bell, Chief Executive, National Forest Company. For services to Forestry. (Hay-on-Wye, Herefordshire)
- Paul Bellringer. For services to GamCare. (Chichester, West Sussex)
- Peter James Bennett, Lately Managing Director, Port of Felixstowe. For services to the Port Industry. (Woodbridge, Suffolk)
- Professor Gordon Mitchell Benson. For services to Architecture. (London, NW5)
- Stanley Ian Bernard, Managing Director, Sco-Fro Foods Ltd. For services to the Food Industry. (Newton Mearns, Renfrewshire)
- Raymond George Bisset, Convenor, Aberdeenshire Council. For services to Local Government. (Inverurie, Aberdeenshire)
- Professor Geoffrey Stewart Boulton, Regius Professor of Geology and Mineralogy, University of Edinburgh. For services to Science and to Higher Education. (Edinburgh)
- Mrs Sarah Bowler. For services to Relate. (London, SW6)
- Paul Alfred Bradstock, Chief Executive, Oxford Trust. For services to Economic Development and Innovation in Oxfordshire. (Reading, Berkshire)
- Capt Anthony David Braithwaite, R.D. For services to the King George's Fund for Sailors. (London, SE3)
- Mrs Jeanne Marion Breen, Executive Director, European Transport Safety Council. For services to Road Safety. (London, SW13)
- Mrs Elizabeth Bridgeford, Director of Social Work, Perth and Kinross Council. For services to Social Work Services. (Perth, Perth and Kinross)
- Roger Brind, Headteacher, Trelai Primary School, Cardiff. For services to Education. (Llandaff, Cardiff)
- Frederick Broughton, Constable, Metropolitan Police. For services to the Joint Central Committee of the Police Federation of England and Wales. (Romford, Essex)
- Mrs Eileen Elizabeth Brown. For services to Children in Romania. (Wallasey, Merseyside)
- Mrs Barbara Browse, Grade 6, Ministry of Defence. (London)
- Robert John Bunting. For services to Home Start. (Hillsborough, Down)
- Barbara Burgess. For public service. (Belfast, Antrim)
- Gillian Burrington. For services to Librarianship and Information Provision, especially for Visually Impaired People. (Altrincham, Cheshire)
- Professor Anthony Busuttil. For services to Forensic Pathology. (Edinburgh)
- David Charles Butcher, Clerk and Superintendent, Billingsgate Market. For services to the Fish Industry. (Banstead, Surrey)
- Mrs Patricia Roberts-Cairns, Editor in Chief, Good Housekeeping. For services to Journalism. (Brighton, Sussex)
- Professor Dugald Cameron, Lately Director, Glasgow School of Art. For services to Art and Design. (Skelmorlie, Ayrshire and Arran)
- John Park Campbell, Chairman, Glenrath Farms Ltd. For services to the Poultry Industry. (West Linton, Peeblesshire)
- Jack Cardiff. For services to Cinematography. (Saffron Walden, Essex)
- Melvyn Carlowe, Chief Executive, Jewish Care. For services to the Jewish Community. (London, N14)
- Derek John Lockhart Carson, TD, DL. For services to Pathology. (Newtownabbey, Antrim)
- William James Caves. For services to Education. (Drumbeg, Belfast)
- John Chambers, Area Administrator, Crown Prosecution Service. (Colyton, Devon)
- Mrs Jennifer Vere Chew, English Teacher, Strode's Sixth Form College, Egham, Surrey. For services to Literacy. (Egham, Surrey)
- Alan Conrad Cheyney. For services to the National Autistic Society.
- Levon Chilingirian, Violinist. For services to Music. (London, SE24)
- Joseph Clarke, Chairman, Greater Manchester Passenger Transport Authority. For services to Public Transport and to the community. (Atherton, Manchester)
- Richard Loris Clegg, MBE. Manager, England International Team. For services to Angling. (Barnsley, South Yorkshire)
- Judy Clements. For services to Community Relations in the West Midlands. (London, SW1P)
- Robert Owen Close, Director, Group Payments Strategy, Barclays Bank plc. For services to the Euro Preparations.
- William David Clouston. For services to Regeneration in the North East of England. (Rothbury, Northumberland)
- Dean James Coady, Detective Constable, Greater Manchester Police. For services to the Police. (Stretford, Manchester)
- Jeffrey Reginald Cocks, Chair, Fforwm. For services to Further Education. (Cardiff)
- Douglas Martyn Colwill, Lately Chairman, Technical Committee of the World Road Association. For services to Highway Engineering. (Wokingham, Berkshire)
- Mrs Edith Conn. For services to the British Red Cross Society in Manchester. (Bolton, Lancashire)
- Mrs Margaret Pauline Coomber, Executive Director, Nursing and Human Resources, Norfolk and Norwich Hospital. For services to Nursing. (Diss, Norfolk)
- David Alan Cooper, Project Director and Team Leader, Government Office for the South East, Department of the Environment, Transport and the Regions. (Surbiton, Surrey)
- Mrs Mary Corbett. For services to Marriage Care. (St Albans, Hertfordshire)
- Mrs Esme Corner, Headteacher, Heacham Middle School, Norfolk. For services to Education and to the National Association of Headteachers. (King's Lynn, Norfolk)
- John Hobson Coulter. For services to Development Awareness. (Oxford, Oxfordshire)
- Mrs Angela Maria Courtney. For services to Housing and to Women's Issues. (Carryduff, Belfast)
- Mrs Penelope Jane Cousins. For services to the Millennium Forests for Scotland Project. (Glasgow)
- Robert Craig, Director, Scottish Library Association. For services to Librarianship. (Hamilton, Lanarkshire)
- John Raymond Craven, Presenter, Countryfile. For services to Rural and Children's Broadcasting. (Near Bicester, Oxfordshire)
- Phyllis Godby Croft, Honorary Veterinary Adviser, Phyllis Croft Foundation for Canine Epilepsy. For services to Animal and Human Welfare. (Tadley, Hampshire)
- Malcolm David Crowder, Project Organiser and Secretary, Heritage of London Trust. For services to the Preservation of the Built Heritage. (Norwich, Norfolk)
- Keith William Darwin, JP, Chairman, Lincolnshire Training and Enterprise Council. For services to Training, Business and the community. (Lincoln, Lincolnshire)
- John Daugman, Inventor. For services to Design and Innovation. (Fenstanton, Cambridgeshire)
- Edwin Davies. For services to Industry on the Isle of Man. (Ballasalla, Isle of Man)
- Kathleen Mary Davies. For services to Women's Issues. (Edinburgh)
- Steve Davis, MBE. For services to Snooker. (Romford, Essex)
- Graham John Davison, Grade 6, Defence Evaluation and Research Agency, Ministry of Defence. (Fleet, Hampshire)
- Bernard Victor Day. For services to the Insurance Industry. (Painswick, Gloucestershire)
- Mrs Camille De San Lazaro. For services to the Care of Sexually Abused Children. (Stocksfield, Northumberland)
- Mrs Erica De'Ath, Chief Executive, National Council of Voluntary Child Care Organisations. For services to Child Care. (London, N1)
- Christopher Colin Dean, MBE. For services to Ice Skating. (USA)
- Gerald Dennis, Vice Chairman, English Sports Council. For services to Sport. (London, NW3)
- Paul Gerard Dick, JP, Headmaster, Kennet School, Berkshire. For services to Education. (Curridge, Berkshire)
- Barbara Gladys Dicks, Chief Executive, Mildmay UK. For services to Palliative Care in London. (London, SW17)
- Mrs Mavis Don. For services to the community in Scarborough, North Yorkshire. (Scarborough, North Yorkshire)
- Hugh Robertson Donald. For services to Family Mediation, Scotland. (Edinburgh)
- Donald Frederick Dovaston, QPM. Deputy Chief Constable, Derbyshire Constabulary. For services to the Police. (Underwood, Derbyshire)
- Mary Jane Drabble, Lately Director of Education, BBC. For services to Broadcasting and to Education. (London, W4)
- Jeannie Drake, Deputy General Secretary, Communication Workers' Union. For services to Employment Relations. (Richmond, Surrey)
- Philip Drakeford, Manager and Company Secretary, Dyfed Education Business Partnership. For services to Industry and to Education in Wales. (Carmarthen, Carmarthenshire)
- Gerald John Draper, Director, Childhood Cancer Research Group, University of Oxford. For services to Childhood Cancer Research. (Oxford, Oxfordshire)
- Mrs Sheila Drury, Chair, North Wales Training and Enterprise Council. For services to Industry Education and Training in Wales. (South Wirral)
- David William Duguid. For services to the Soldiers', Sailors' and Airmen's Families Association in Glasgow. (Cairndow, Argyll and Bute)
- Mrs Frances Duncan, JP. Provost, Angus Council. For services to Local Government. (By Forfar, Angus)
- William Joseph Duncan, Grade 7, Ministry of Agriculture, Fisheries and Food. (Reading, Berkshire)
- Ratna Dutt, Director, Race Equality Unit. For services to Community Relations. (London, N16)
- Michael William Frederick Dyer, Chairman of Trustees, Usk House Day Hospice, Powys. For services to the NHS. (Crickhowell, Powys)
- Michael Laurence Eastman. For services to the Frontier Youth Trust and to Disadvantaged Young People. (Romford, Essex)
- Frank Ellis. For services to the Development of Radiotherapy. (Oxford, Oxfordshire)
- David George Erwin. For services to the Marine Environment. (Downpatrick, Down)
- Anthony Evans, Designer, Millennium Product. For services to the Shoe Industry. (Coleford, Gloucestershire)
- Mrs Pamela Mary Everton, Lately Director of Nursing and Quality, Essex and Hertfordshire Community NHS Trust. For services to Nursing. (London, E4)
- Raymond John Evison. For services to Horticulture on Guernsey. (Guernsey, Channel Islands)
- Mrs Patricia Fairclough. For services to Basketball. (London, W12)
- David Alan Faulkner. For services to the community in Newcastle upon Tyne.
- Joyce Cameron Ferguson, Headteacher, Abercromby Primary School, Tullibody. For services to Primary Education. (Alloa, Clackmannan)
- Professor Ruth Hilary Finnegan, Lately Professor in Comparative Social Institutions, Open University. For services to Social Sciences. (Milton Keynes, Buckinghamshire)
- The Rev Canon Colin William Fletcher, Co-Chairman, Lambeth Group. For services to the Millennium Celebrations. (London, SE1)
- Richard William Freer, Grade 7, Ministry of Defence. (Oxford, Oxfordshire)
- Professor Herbert Alan French. For services to Military Research. (Emsworth, Hampshire)
- Mrs Anne Rosemary Fuller, JP, Lately Chairman, Magistrates' Association. For services to the Administration of Justice. (Claygate Esher, Surrey)
- Barrington John Albert Furr, Chief Scientist, AstraZeneca Pharmaceuticals. For services to Cancer Drug Research. (Macclesfield, Cheshire)
- Raymond Percy Galton, Writer. For services to Television Comedy Drama. (Surrey)
- Mrs Barbara Jean Garland. For services to the Women Caring Trust] (London, SW1W)
- Peter Garratt, Chairman, British Consultants' Bureau. For services to Export. (Nr. Tonbridge, Kent)
- Michael Garrity, Head, Department of Nursing, University of Salford. For services to Nursing Education. (Radcliffe, Greater Manchester)
- Thomas Henry Geddis. For public service. (London)
- Professor Richard John Gilbert, Lately Director, PHLS Food Hygiene Laboratory. For services to Food Safety. (Harpenden, Hertfordshire)
- Muriel Elizabeth Gilliland. For public service. (Newtownabbey, Antrim)
- Jonathan Henry William Gipps, Director, London Zoo. For services to the Web of Life Project. (London, SW15)
- Colin Godber, For services to Elderly Mentally Ill People. (Southampton, Hampshire)
- Stephen Grand, Designer, Millennium Product. For services to the Computer Games Industry. (Shipham, Somerset)
- Albert Winfield Grant. For services to Community Relations in Ipswich, Suffolk. (Ipswich, Suffolk)
- Sandra Mary Grant. For services to the Scottish Health Advisory Service. (Glasgow)
- Mrs Rosemary Anne Jennifer Gray, Member, Government Panel on Sustainable Development Education. For services to Sustainable Development. (Birmingham, West Midlands)
- The Rev Alan Greenbat. For services to Interfaith Dialogue and to Young People. (London, N11)
- Professor Andrew Robert Grieve. For services to Dentistry. (Dundee)
- Sian Meryl Griffiths. For services to Public Health. (Oxford, Oxfordshire)
- Mrs Gillian Ann Hackman, Grade 7, Department of the Environment, Transport and the Regions. (Beckenham, Kent)
- Mrs Aileen Oonagh Hall, Inspector of Taxes, H.M. Board of Inland Revenue. (Hinckley, Leicestershire)
- Michael Halliday, Modernisation Programme Training Manager, HM Board of Inland Revenue. (Sudbrooke, Lincolnshire)
- John Hector Hamilton. For services to Sail Training for Young People. (London, E14)
- Advocate Francis Charles Hamon, Deputy Bailiff of Jersey. For services to the community. (Trinity, Jersey)
- John Reder Foy Hansell, Senior Natural Resources Adviser, Department for International Development. (London, SW1A)
- Mrs Penelope Hardwick, JP, DL. For services to Youth Organisations in West Sussex. (Chicester, West Sussex)
- Caroline Anne Harper. For services to the Gas Industry. (London, W11)
- Daniel Edward Harvey. For services to Banking. (Malone, Belfast)
- The Ven John Derek Risdon Hayward. For services to St. Luke's Hospital for the Clergy. (Bath, Somerset)
- Malcolm Suthon Hewitt, JP, Lately National Director, National Educational Assessment Centre. For services to Education. (Birmingham, West Midlands)
- John Finlay Hibbert, Lately Her Majesty's Coroner for Cheshire. For services to the Coroners' Service. (Congleton, Cheshire)
- Mrs Wendy Elizabeth Hickling, JP, DL. For services to the Administration of Justice and to the Fosse Community Health Services NHS Trust in Leicestershire. (Leicester, Leicestershire)
- Alastair Malcolm Hill, QC. For services to the Law and the Disability Law Service. (London, SW19)
- Sir James Frederick Hill, Bt, DL. For services to the community in Bradford, West Yorkshire. (Ilkey, West Yorkshire)
- David Holloway. For services to the Tower Hamlets Summer University. (London, SE4)
- Christopher John Holmes. For services to St. Helena's Hospice in Colchester, Essex. (Colchester, Essex)
- Professor Stephen Campbell Holt, Lately Rector and Chief Executive, Roehampton Institute, London. For services to Higher Education. (Steyning, West Sussex)
- Christopher Bruce Holtby, Grade 7, Ministry of Defence. (Battersea, London)
- Professor Frank Robert Albert Hopgood. For services to Computer Science. (Wantage, Oxfordshire)
- John Michael Howell. For services to Export in Central and Eastern Europe. (Warborough, Oxfordshire)
- Michael Gilbert James William Howse, Designer, Millennium Product. For services to the Aerospace Industry. (Uttoxeter, Staffordshire)
- Professor Philip Edwin Howse, Designer, Millennium Product. For services to the Insect Control Industry. (Gosport, Hampshire)
- Professor John Hughes. For services to Prosthetics and Orthotics Education and Training. (Renfrewshire)
- Colin Moffat Hunter, Chairman, Scottish Council, Royal College of General Practitioners. For services to Primary Health Care. (Westhill, Aberdeenshire)
- John Andrew Adam Hunter. For services to Rehabilitation Medicine for People with Disabilities. (By Linlithgow, West Lothian)
- Roy Edward Hurst, Lately Grade 7, Defence School of Languages, Ministry of Defence. (Langley, Berkshire)
- Charles McLachlan Husband, New Deal Co-ordinator, Scotland Employment Service, Department for Education and Employment. (Balerno, Midlothian)
- William Eric Husselby, DL. For services to the community in the West Midlands. (Nr. Kenilworth, Warwickshire)
- Thomas David Inch. For services to Chemistry and to the Royal Society of Chemistry. (Salisbury, Wiltshire)
- Michael John Ive, H.M. Inspector Specialist Adviser for Design and Technology, OFSTED. (Taunton, Somerset)
- Colin Ray Jackson, MBE. For services to Athletics. (Cardiff)
- Frank Stuart Jackson, Director of Resources and Deputy Chief Executive, the King's Fund. For services to the NHS. (London, SE1)
- Steven Melvin Edward Jacobs, Chief Executive, Stratford Development Partnership. For services to Regeneration in East London. (London, E4)
- Mrs Pip Jaffa. For services to the community. (Belfast)
- Mrs Paulette James, Pay Span 8, Court Service Agency, Lord Chancellor's Department. (London, NW9)
- Martin Jarvis, Actor. For services to Drama. (London, SW1W)
- Robert Jennings, JP, Community Links Co-ordinator, St. George Community School, Bristol. For services to Education. (Redland, Bristol)
- Clifford Layton Jones, Director, Tower Colliery. For services to Coal Mining in Wales. (Glais, Swansea)
- Peris Pritchard Jones, Lately Chairman, Rail Users' Consultative Committee for the Midlands. For services to Public Transport Users. (Stourport on Severn, Worcestershire)
- Avtar Singh Jouhl. For services to Community Relations and to Trade Unionism. (Solihull, West Midlands)
- Professor Michael Joy, Honorary Visiting Consultant Cardiologist, UK CAA. For services to the Aviation Industry. (Longcross, Surrey)
- Dennis Joynson, Group Director, BNFL. For services to the Nuclear Generating Industry. (Cheltenham, Gloucestershire)
- Michael Rudolf Katz. For charitable services to the community in Dorset. (Canford Cliffs, Dorset)
- Khalilur Rahman Kazi. For services to Community Relations. (London, E12)
- Colette Kelleher, Director, Daycare Trust. For services to Child Care. (London, N15)
- Anthony Kelly, Lately Compliance Team Leader, H.M. Board of Inland Revenue. (Whitefield, Greater Manchester)
- Peter Maxwell Kemp. For services to the Social Services in County Durham.
- Alan Grainger Kerr. For services to Otolaryngology. (Belfast)
- Ian Henry Kerr, Chief Fire Officer. For services to the Shropshire Fire and Rescue Service. (Shrewsbury, Shropshire)
- Mrs Diana Mary King. For services to Sport. (Solihull, West Midlands)
- Michael David Kirk, Chairman, S.P.S. Technologies Ltd. For services to the Engineering Industry. (Knighton, Leicestershire)
- Peter Kirkham, Policy Adviser, VAT Policy Analysis and Formulation, H.M. Board of Customs and Excise. (Horsham, West Sussex)
- Keith Allan Kirkpatrick, Director of Manufacturing and Product Improvement, Babcock Rosyth Defence Ltd. For services to the Defence Industry. (Dumbarton, Dunbartonshire)
- Mark Knopfler, Guitarist and Songwriter. For services to Music. (London, SW3)
- Douglass Ian Knowles, Lately Grade 7, Ministry of Defence. (Cheddar, Somerset)
- David Logan Laird, Chairman, North East Regional Board, Scottish Natural Heritage. For services to the Environment. (By Forfar, Angus)
- Peter Lampl, Chairman, Sutton Trust. For services to Access to Higher Education. (London, SW19)
- John Bryan Lavelle. For services to the Institute of Public Relations. (London, SE5)
- Jean Marie Maurice Le Guen, Grade 6, Health and Safety Executive, Department of the Environment, Transport, and the Regions. (London, SE3)
- Donald Francis Leeper, Director, Building Services Research and Information Association. For services to the Construction Industry. (Esher, Surrey)
- Leonard Stephen Levy, Head of Toxicology and Risk Assessment Group, Medical Research Council Institute of Environment and Health. For services to Health and Safety. (Solihull, West Midlands)
- Marcus Allan Liddle. For services to Young People. (Stirling and Falkirk)
- George Lindsay, Engineering Technology Projects manager, AstraZeneca plc. For services to the promotion of Combined Heat and Power. (Huddersfield, West Yorkshire)
- Robert Peter Lisney, Head of Management Resources, Environment Group, Hampshire County Council. For services to Sustainable Waste Management. (Chandlers Ford, Hampshire)
- Robert Frankland Little. For services to the NHS and to the community in Nottingham. (Nottingham, Nottinghamshire)
- Peter Huw Llewelyn, Member, Gwalia Housing Society. For services to the Housing Association Movement in Wales. (Langland, Swansea)
- Christopher Lloyd, Journalist. For services to Horticulture. (Rye, East Sussex)
- Anne Elizabeth Longfield, Chief Executive, Kids' Club Network. For services to Young People. (London, SE22)
- Professor Michael Henry Loretto. For services to Materials Science and to Technology Transfer. (Birmingham, West Midlands)
- Mrs Eileen Lowe. For services to the Carers' National Association in London. (London, E16)
- Mrs Mary Elizabeth Maureen Lundie, JP, Lately Matron, Erskine Hospital, Scotland. For services to Disabled Ex-Service Personnel. (Bishopton, Renfrewshire)
- John Neville Lunn. For services to Anaesthesia. (Chepstow, Monmouthshire)
- Mrs Christine Mabey, Lately Secretary and Clerk to the Governors, Birkbeck College. For services to Higher Education. (London, N5)
- Mrs Norma Machell, Deputy Headteacher, Scarcroft Primary School, York. For services to Education. (York, North Yorkshire)
- Colin William Maclean, Director General, Meat and Livestock Commission. For services to the British Meat and Livestock Industry. (Reading, Berkshire)
- Jeremy Harold Manuel. For services to the Gauchers Association. (London, NW11)
- Derek Shepherd Marr, QFSM, Firemaster, Tayside Fire Brigade. For services to the Fire Service. (Broughty Ferry, Dundee)
- William James Masterson. For services to Further and Higher Education. (Newry, Down)
- The Rev Andrew Mawson. For services to the community in Bromley-By-Bow, London. (London, E9)
- John Maxfield, JP. For services to the Administration of Justice in Bedfordshire. (Cranfield, Bedfordshire)
- Peter Stewart Maxwell. For services to the Research Councils. (Highworth, Wiltshire)
- Mrs Carole Ann Mayers. For services to the WRVS, especially for Disaster Relief. (Wickham Bishops, Essex)
- Mrs Anna McCabe. For services to Nursing. (Belfast)
- Brian Godfrey McClelland. For services to the Police Service. (Bangor, Down)
- Peter David Godfrey McCormick, Vice President, Duke of Edinburgh Award. For charitable services. (Kirby Overblow, North Yorkshire)
- Mrs Margaret Jean McCreadie, Grade 7, Department of Social Security. (Irvine, Ayrshire and Arran)
- John Smith McDonald. For services to the Whisky Industry, particularly the Tomatin Distillery, Inverness-shire. (Tomatin, Inverness)
- Colin John Ignatius McGill, Lately Officer in Charge, HM Board of Inland Revenue. (Linlithgow, West Lothian)
- Mrs Aideen McGinley. For services to the Northern Ireland Millennium Company. (Enniskillen, Fermanagh)
- Edward Brian McGinnis, Special Adviser, MENCAP. For services to People with Learning Disabilities. (Croydon, Surrey)
- Mrs Mary Teresa McGowan, Senior Tutor, University of Warwick. For services to Continuing Education. (Stratford-upon-Avon, Warwickshire)
- Robert Barnett McGregor. For services to the New Deal in South Derbyshire. (Derby, Derbyshire)
- Francis Oliver McGurrin, Deputy Chief Executive and Chief Nurse. For services to the Mayday Hospital, Croydon, Surrey. (Banstead, Surrey)
- John Edward McIntyre, Lately Head of Preservation, National Library of Scotland. For services to Libraries and Archive Preservation. (Linlithgow, West Lothian)
- Mrs Marion North-McNamara, Director, Laban Centre, London. For services to Dance. (London, WC1B)
- Ian McNee, Lately Chairman, Parole Board for Scotland. For services to Criminal Justice. (Drem, East Lothian)
- Ian Brice McQuiston, For services to the National Trust and to Conservation. (Bangor, Down)
- Bharat Mehta, Clerk to the Trustees, City Parochial Foundation, London. For services to the National Schizophrenia Fellowship. (London, N13)
- Ian James Miller, Lately Secretary, Napier University. For services to Higher Education. (Edinburgh)
- Thomas James Milligan, Field Operations Manager South, B.T. For services to the Telecommunications Industry.
- Brian James Lundie Minto, Vice-Chairman, Scottish Qualifications Authority. For services to Vocational Education and Training in Scotland. (Blairgowrie, Perth and Kinross)
- Ashwin Govindbhai Mistry, Director, Leicestershire Training and Enterprise Council and Leicestershire Careers and Guidance Service Ltd. For services to Training and Careers Guidance. (Oadby, Leicestershire)
- Geoffrey Bentley Mitchell. For services to Financial Reporting. (Tunbridge Wells, Kent)
- Lawrence Montagu, Headteacher, St. Peter's High School, Gloucester. For services to Education. (Tuffley, Gloucestershire)
- Michael Oscar Moore, Director, Environmental Services, North Yorkshire County Council. For services to Highways and Civil Engineering. (Northallerton, North Yorkshire)
- Denys Malcolm Morgan. For services to Local Government and to Civil Engineering in Wales. (Gower, Swansea)
- Professor Alun Owen Morris, Professor of Mathematics, University of Wales, Aberystwyth. For services to Higher Education. (Aberystwyth, Ceredigion)
- David Roger Morris, Lately Treasurer, Association of Charitable Foundations. For services to the Voluntary Sector. (Liverpool, Merseyside)
- Elizabeth Mary Morris. For services to Polar Science. (Cambridge, Cambridgeshire)
- Mrs Mary Elizabeth Moxon, Grade 6, Home Office. (Elstead, Surrey)
- Angela Chiowoniso Muchatuta, Director of Patient Services, Bedfordshire and Luton Community NHS Trust. For services to Nursing. (Thrapston, Northamptonshire)
- Irek Mukhamedov, Dancer. For services to Dance. (Gt. Billington, Bedfordshire)
- Edward Murphy, Chief Executive, Liverpool Council for Voluntary Service. For services to Regeneration. (Liverpool, Merseyside)
- Liam Neeson, Actor. For services to Drama. (NY10023, USA)
- Mrs Shirley Nolan. For services to the Anthony Nolan Bone Marrow Trust. (Adelaide, Australia)
- Barry Francis Norman, Inspector, Social Services Inspectorate, Department of Health. (Godalming, Surrey)
- Grania Meve Phipps, Dowager Marchioness of Normanby, For services to the community, especially the Captain Cook Memorial Museum, Whitby, North Yorkshire. (Whitby, North Yorkshire)
- Professor Patricia Nuttall, Director, Natural Environment Research Council Institute of Virology and Environmental Microbiology. For services to Environmental Science and Policy. (Abingdon, Oxfordshire)
- Judith Miriam Oakes, MBE. For services to Athletics. (Birmingham, West Midlands)
- Mrs Gloria Oates, DL Chief Executive, Oldham NHS Trust. For services to Health Care. (Ramsbottom, Lancashire)
- Steven Michael James Ovett, MBE. For services to Athletics. (Castle Douglas, Dumfries)
- Mrs Valerie Owens. For services to the Probation Service. (Dundonald, Belfast)
- Ramon Pajares, Managing Director, Savoy Group of Hotels. For services to the Hotel Industry. (London, SW1X)
- Mrs Ann Parker. For services to the Development of Psychosexual Medicine in Wales. (Abergavenny, Gwent)
- Mrs Susan Anne Scott-Parker, Chief Executive, Employers' Forum on Disability. For services to disabled people. (London, SE1)
- John Brian Pearce, Director, Inter-Faith Network. For Services to Inter-Faith Relations and to the Millennium Celebrations. (London, SE21)
- Professor Brian Leonard Pentecost, For services to the British Heart Foundation. (Birmingham, West Midlands)
- Simon Pepper, Head, World Wide Fund for Nature (Scotland). For services to Sustainable Development. (Aberfeldy, Perth and Kinross)
- Annabel Clare Pillman, Head, Millennium Unit, Department for Culture, Media and Sport. (London, SE5)
- Courtney Pine. For services to Jazz Music. (North Harrow, Middlesex)
- Mrs Traudi Gerta Regina Plesch, MBE. For charitable services to the community in Staffordshire. (Newcastle-under-Lyme, Staffordshire)
- Mrs Margaret McArthur Pollard, Headteacher, Richmond Park, Glasgow. For services to Pupils with Special Educational Needs. (Pollokshields, Glasgow)
- Mrs Elizabeth Anne Powell, Practice Nurse, St. Helens and Knowsley Health Authority. For services to Primary Care. (Wigan, Lancashire)
- Jon Andrew Power, Grade 6, Department for Education and Employment. (Sheffield, South Yorkshire)
- Simon John Preston, Organist. For services to Music. (Tunbridge Wells, Kent)
- Kenneth John Pritchard, Chief Education Adviser, West Sussex County Council. For services to Education. (Bognor Regis, West Sussex)
- Peter John Purton. For services to the Wine Standards Board of the Vintners' Company. (Chipping Norton, Oxfordshire)
- John Andrew Rankin, Farmer. For services to Agriculture. (Newtownards, Down)
- Mrs Tessa Ransford, Poet. For services to the Scottish Poetry Library. (Edinburgh)
- Brian Martin Neville Rata. For charitable services to Addenbrooke's Hospital N.H.S. Trust. (Bedford, Bedfordshire)
- David Alexander Ravey. For services to the Welsh National Board for Nursing, Midwifery and Health Visiting. (Cowbridge, Vale of Glamorgan)
- Brian Idris Rees, Consultant Surgeon, University Hospital of Wales, Cardiff. For services to Medicine. (Cardiff)
- The Rt Rev Gavin Hunter Reid, Chairman, Archbishops' Millennium Advisory Group. For services to the Millennium Celebrations. (Ashford, Kent)
- Professor Andrew Gordon Renwick. For services to the UK Medicines Licensing Authority and to Pharmacology. (Eastleigh, Hampshire)
- Keith Edmund Reynolds, Chairman, Park Lane College Corporation, Leeds. For services to Further Education. (Leeds, West Yorkshire)
- David William Hugh Richards, President, Welsh Council, National Farmers' Union. For services to Agriculture. (Llanelli, Carmarthenshire)
- Mrs Elizabeth Anne Richards, Headteacher, Manselton Primary School, Swansea. For services to Education. (Fforestfach, Swansea)
- William Samuel Clive Richards, For charitable services. (Ullingswick, Herefordshire)
- Andrew George Rickman, Designer, Millennium Product. For services to Home Computing. (Marlborough, Wiltshire)
- Jennifer Storm Ritchie, Grade 7, Department of Social Security. (Ouston, Durham)
- Rosemary Roberts, Director, Peers Early Education Partnership. For services to Early Years Education in Oxford. (Oxford, Oxfordshire)
- Roger Leon Robinson, JP. For services to the community, particularly Disabled People, in London. (London, N6)
- The Hon Susan Roe. For services to the Woods on Your Doorstep Project. (Huntingdon, Cambridgeshire)
- Colin Cyril Rollinson, Assisting Team Leader, H.M. Board of Inland Revenue. (Maidstone, Kent)
- Ann Rossiter, Proprietor, H. Bronnley and Company Ltd. For services to the Toiletries Industry. (London, W8)
- Mrs Patti Rundall, Policy Director, Baby Milk Action. For services to Infant Nutrition. (Cambridge, Cambridgeshire)
- Ian Paul Rutter, General Medical Practitioner, West Yorkshire. For services to Health Care. (Bingley, West Yorkshire)
- Stuart Courtney Lewis Saunders, Headteacher, Ysgol Rhydygors, Carmarthen. For services to Special Educational Needs. (White Mill, Carmarthenshire)
- Alan Sayles. For services to the Farleigh Hospice and to the Hospice Movement. (Chelmsford, Essex)
- Romilda Scannelli, Mathematics Teacher, Uplands Community College, Wadhurst. For services to Education. (Rotherfield, East Sussex)
- Mrs Jill Audrey Scott, JP, DL. For services to St. John Ambulance. (King's Lynn, Norfolk)
- Veronica June Selio, Registrar, Employment Appeal Tribunal, Department of Trade and Industry. (East Molesey, Surrey)
- James Seton. For services to the Scottish Agricultural College. (Inverness)
- Brian Leonard Edward Seymour. For services to the Sea Cadet Corps in London. (Brentwood, Essex)
- Samir Shah. For services to Equal Opportunities in Broadcasting. (London, SW18)
- Brig Ian Richard Duff Shapter, DL. For services to the Territorial, Auxiliary and Volunteer Reserve Association in North West England. (Hightown, Merseyside)
- Neville Anthony Donald Sharvell, Director and Company Secretary, IMS Ltd. For services to the Defence Industry. (Guildford, Surrey)
- Marcus David Shaw, Head of Operations, Central Unit, Home Office. (Felpham, West Sussex)
- Daniel Jude Sheridan, Special Adviser, Market Regulation, the Stock Exchange. For services to the Stock Exchange. (Petts Wood, Kent)
- Maeve Sherlock, Director, National Council for One Parent Families. For services to the elimination of Child Poverty. (London, N4)
- Ross Michael Shimmon, Lately Chief Executive, Library Association. For services to Librarianship and Information Provision. (The Hague, Netherlands)
- Martin William Shreeve, Director, Better Government for Older People Programme. For services to Elderly People. (Wolverhampton, West Midlands)
- Leslie Albert Sigrist, Grade 6, Ministry of Defence. (Evercreech, Somerset)
- Professor Hugh Richard Silverman, For services to the Development of Cardiff Bay. (Bristol)
- Alan Francis Simpson, Writer. For services to Television Comedy Drama. (Petts Wood, Kent)
- Jennifer Linda Simpson. For services to the Development of Medical Management in the NHS. (Sheffield, South Yorkshire)
- Capt Patrick Buxton Mitford-Slade. For services to the Officers' Association. (Hook, Hampshire)
- Brian Albert Smith, Senior Manager, Royal Mint. (Penfai, Bridgend)
- Elizabeth Smith, National Officer, TUC Learning Services. For services to Lifelong Learning. (Liverpool, Merseyside)
- Brig John Graham Holmes-Smith. For services to the Soldiers', Sailors' and Airmen's Families Association and to Child Welfare. (Aldershot, Hampshire)
- Roger Drummond Smith. For services to the Millennium Seed Bank. (Henfield, West Sussex)
- Susanna Smith. For services to OXFAM. (Oxford, Oxfordshire)
- Matthew Raymond Snoddy, Media Editor, The Times. For services to Journalism. (Hillingdon, Middlesex)
- Timothy Leonard Spall, Actor. For services to Drama. (London, W1P)
- Hugh David McConnachie Speed, Non-Executive Director, Northumbrian Water Group. For services to the Water Industry. (Edinburgh)
- John Damian Spurling. For charitable services. (London, W1H)
- Alison Steadman, Actress. For services to Drama. (London, N6)
- John Stephenson, Designer, Millennium Product. For services to the Computer Animation Industry. (London, N19)
- Anne Stewart, Headteacher, Raploch Primary School, Stirling. For services to Education. (Buchlyvie, Stirling)
- Helen Elizabeth Stone, Chairman, Construction Industry Council Equal Opportunities Task Force. For services to Promoting Equal Opportunities in the Construction Industry. (London, WC2H)
- Professor Richard Susskind. For services to the use of IT in Law and to the Administration of Justice. (Radlett, Hertfordshire)
- David Anthony Tate. For services to the Business/Community Links in East London. (Crowborough, East Sussex)
- Professor Christopher John Taylor. For services to Foresight and to Health Care. (Stockport, Cheshire)
- George Taylor, Lately Governor, H.M. Young Offenders' Institution Dumfries, Scottish Prison Service. (Dumfries)
- John Derek Terry, Chief Fire Officer. For services to the Avon Fire Brigade. (Almondsbury, Bristol)
- William John Tester, Vice Chairman, The Royal British Legion Poppy Factory Ltd. For services to Ex-Servicemen and Women. (Welling, Kent)
- Mrs Gillian Thomas, Chief Executive. For services to the @Bristol Project. (London, W8)
- Mrs Tanni Carys Davina Grey-Thompson, MBE. For services to Disabled Sport. (Birmingham, West Midlands)
- Anne Catherine Thurston. For services to Public Administration in Africa. (Lower Sunbury, Middlesex)
- Jayne Torvill, MBE. For services to Ice Skating. (Heathfield, East Sussex)
- Robert Brian Turner, Technical Director, Graseby Dynamics Ltd. For services to the Defence Industry. (Chesham, Buckinghamshire)
- Timothy Charles Twining, Head, Clinical Psychology Service, Cardiff Community Healthcare NHS Trust. For services to Healthcare. (Creigiau, Cardiff)
- Michael Underwood, Managing Director, GA Construction. For services to the Construction Industry and to Building Standards. (Linlithgow, West Lothian)
- Mrs Margaret Alison Vass, President, Chartered Institute of Housing. For services to Housing. (Blanefield, Glasgow)
- Michael Alexander Venables, Political Adviser, Kosovo, Ministry of Defence. (Andover, Hampshire)
- Beryl Frances Vertue, Chairman, Hartswood Films. For services to Independent Television Production. (London, W11)
- Professor Michael Douglas Allen Vickers, Chairman, North Glamorgan NHS Trust. For services to Health Care in Wales. (Cardiff)
- Mrs Mary Elizabeth Villiers, Editor of Debates, House of Lords. (Nr Sittingbourne, Kent)
- Rex Ashley Walford, Lately Lecturer in Geography and Education, University of Cambridge. For services to Geographical Scholarship. (Newnham, Cambridgeshire)
- Thomas Gordon Walker. For services to Science. (Didcot, Oxfordshire)
- Robin Wallace, Lately Chief Engineer, Eagle Star Insurance. For services to Industrial Health and Safety. (Knowle, West Midlands)
- Garry Sanderson Watson, Scottish Legal Services Ombudsman. For services to Users of Legal Services. (By Gorebridge, Midlothian)
- Keith Leonard Weller, Head, Qualifications Division, Qualifications and Curriculum Authority. For services to Education. (London, N14)
- Christopher John Wilkinson. For services to Architecture. (London, SE21)
- Professor David Arnold Williams. For services to Astrophysical Chemistry. (Barnet, Hertfordshire)
- David Michael Williams, Chief Executive, Swansea NHS Trust. For services to Health Care in Wales. (Mayals, Swansea)
- Mary Williams, Executive Director, Brake. For services to Road Safety. (Huddersfield, Yorkshire)
- Susan Elizabeth Williams, Director of Nursing, Greater Glasgow Health Board. For services to the NHS. (Skelmorlie, Ayrshire and Arran)
- Denis Henry Wilson, JP. For services to Higher Education. (Belfast)
- Lt Col John Lawrence Wilson, DL. For services to the community, especially the St. John Ambulance Brigade, in Leicestershire. (Leicester, Leicestershire)
- Mrs June Wilson, Clinical Nurse Specialist, Cancer Care and Chemotherapy Unit, Stoke Mandeville Hospital. For services to Cancer Care. (Buckingham, Buckinghamshire)
- Marlene Clair Blauer Winfield, Acting Head of Strategy, National Consumer Council. For services to Civil Justice Reforms. (London, NW5)
- Mrs Heather McNeil Wing, Head of Inspection and Registration, Surrey Social Services Department. For services to Social Services. (Bracknell, Berkshire)
- The Reverend Canon Diana Katharine Witts, General Secretary. For services to the Church Mission Society. (Richmond, Surrey)
- Mrs Mary Wondrausch, Potter. For services to Art. (Guildford, Surrey)
- Paul Evans Wood, President, National Association of Valuation Tribunals. For services to Local Government. (Sheffield, South Yorkshire)
- Barbara Woroncow, Lately President, Museums Association. For services to Museums. (Leeds, West Yorkshire)
- Peter Richard Worrall, Grade 6, Ministry of Defence. (Chippenham, Wiltshire)
- Judith Angela Wrighton, Deputy Ceremonial Officer, Cabinet Office. (Basingstoke, Hampshire)
- William Raymond Wyrill. For services to Lincolnshire County Council and to the community in Lincolnshire. (Lincoln, Lincolnshire)
- Saeed Zahedi, Designer, Millennium Product. For services to the Prosthetics Industry. (Guildford, Surrey)

Diplomatic and Overseas list

- Barry Thomas Adams, For services to British business in Brazil.
- Albert Dennis Askew, For services to leprosy relief.
- Francis Parton Barber, MBE Honorary British Consul, San Pedro, Sula.
- Michael George Bird, Director, British Council, Ukraine.
- Capt Christopher Andrew Hervey Blake, For services to youth and sail training.
- Patrick Thomas Carroll, For services to British exports to Japan.
- Dr Timothy Clayden, Counsellor, Foreign and Commonwealth Office.
- Professor Francis Edwin Close, For services to research and the public understanding of science.
- Hywel Coleman, For services to education in Indonesia.
- John McIntosh Crawford, For services to British-Brazilian relations.
- Mrs Carolyn Louise Cripps, For services to children's charities in Russia.
- Col Timothy James Earl, Lately Secretary, Government Hospitality Fund.
- William Henry Frankel, For services to human rights.
- Christopher Paul Gibbard, For services to prison reform in the Caribbean Overseas Territories.
- Albert Louis Hammond, For services to music and songwriting.
- John Harrison, For services to social development in the Caribbean.
- John Ogilvy Houlton, MBE Director, British Film Office, Los Angeles.
- Mrs Judith Eileen Hemery Howick, Director of Schools and Professional Development, British Council.
- Anthony Ashby Hughes, For services to global seismology.
- Jeremy Nicholas Wain Jennings, For services to British-Belgian trade.
- Col Andrew Hubert Joscelyne, Lately Deputy Head, European Commission Monitoring Mission, Belgrade.
- Jane Seymour Keach, For services to acting and entertainment.
- Dr Robert Graham Killick, For services to archaeology overseas.
- Dr David Maurice Landsman, Lately D.H.M., British Embassy, Belgrade.
- Alexander John Maisner, Economics Assistant, Bonn.
- Barnaby Mason, For services to broadcasting.
- Charles Washington Misick, For community service, Turks and Caicos Islands.
- Richard Gordon Monk, QPM Lately Head of UN International Police Task Force, Bosnia.
- Dr Jane Moon, For services to archaeology overseas.
- Colin Paul Peter Mulcahy, First Secretary, British High Commission, New Delhi.
- Richard John Beresford Neal, For services to British-Japanese trade.
- Timothy William O'Brien, For services to British-Malaysian trade.
- Douglas Edwin Oakervee, For services to civil engineering overseas.
- David Ian Ramsay, Secretary, British Group, Inter-Parliamentary Union.
- Mrs Claudia Cynthia James-Roach, For services to public administration, Montserrat.
- Edmundo Ros, For services to entertainment.
- Sister Gillian Margaret Rose, For services to community healthcare in Bangladesh.
- Michele Saward, Director E.U. Relations, British Council, Brussels.
- Professor Jeffrey Jon Shaw, For services to the study of leishmaniasis.
- David Arthur Slinn, Lately First Secretary, British Embassy, Belgrade.
- Clive Adrian Stafford Smith, For humanitarian services in the legal field.
- Dr Daniel Orlando Smith, MBE Lately Chief Medical Officer, British Virgin Islands.
- Mrs Eugenie Etheline Todman-Smith, MBE For community service, British Virgin Islands.
- Benjamin Stevenson, Artistic Director, Houston Ballet.
- Derek Hugh Taylor, Chief Minister, Turks and Caicos Islands.
- Michael David Teden, For services to British-American trade.
- Edward Ernest Webster, Head, British School, Antwerp.
- Anthony Westnedge, For services to British-Latin American relations.
- John Robert Leigh Whitechurch, For services to the local community, Nigeria.

==== Members (MBE) ====
Members of the Order of the British Empire are in the fifth tier of the Order. The recipients in the 2000 list are as follows:

Military division
Navy

- Capt Nicholas Mark Kenwood Anthony, Royal Marines.
- PO Caterer Lee Richard Goldhill,
- WO Martin Robert Hall,
- Sub Lt Kevin Johnson, Royal Navy.
- Leading Operator Maintainer Andrew John Newey,
- Lt Cdr Martyn Robert Skeer, Royal Navy.
- Lt John Wilson Barker, Royal Navy.
- Lt Cdr Nicholas John Britton, Royal Navy.
- WO David Charles Brotherwood,
- WO Michael Frederick Cahill,
- CPO Marine Engineer Mechanic Leslie Simon Collier,
- Capt Robert Terence Cooper, Royal Marines.
- Lt Cdr Andrew James Course, Royal Navy.
- Lt Cdr Richard Alister Cunningham, Royal Navy.
- Lt Cdr Jeremy Stephen Foster, Royal Navy.
- Lt Cdr David William Giles, Royal Navy.
- CPO Kevin Hall,
- PO James Andrew Timothy Hallowes, Royal Naval Reserve.
- Lt Cdr Timothy Charles Hodgson, Royal Navy.
- WO Martin Jan Hubbard,
- Lt Cdr Owen Jarrett, Royal Navy.
- CPO Ian Johnston, Royal Fleet Auxiliary.
- WO Graham Frank Lloyd,
- Lt Cdr Stanley Alan Lowe, Royal Navy.
- Lt Cdr Andrew McKie, Royal Navy.
- Colour Sgt Paul Millar, Royal Marines.
- Lt Cdr Ian Vernon Munday, Royal Navy.
- CPO Weapon Engineering Artificer Robert Stephen Newbitt,
- WO John Marwood Notley,
- WO Paul Richard Albert Phillips,
- Capt Matthew Edward Porter, Royal Marines.
- Maj Jeremy Matthew Francis Robbins, Royal Marines.
- Band Colour Sgt David Sharp, Royal Marines.
- Lt Cdr Philip Andrew George Shaw, Royal Navy.
- Lt Cdr Stephen Alan Christopher Shipman, Royal Navy.
- Lt Cdr Eric Patrick Bartholomew Sneyd, Royal Navy.
- Lt Cdr Anthony Graham Whetton, Royal Navy.
- Lt Cdr Andrew Watt Will, Royal Navy.

Army

- Cpl Wayne Raymond Bale, Corps of Royal Engineers.
- Maj John Michael Barrett, The Parachute Regiment.
- Maj Mark Alexander Popham Carleton-Smith, Irish Guards.
- Capt Stuart Michael Crofts, 9th/12th Royal Lancers.
- Sgt Carl Tudor David, Welsh Guards.
- Maj Alister Timewell Davis, The Royal Logistic Corps.
- Maj Benedict Charles Farrell, Irish Guards.
- Capt Antony Paul Ferris, Royal Corps of Signals.
- WO Class 2 John Paul Gaughan, BEM Corps of Royal Engineers.
- Maj Piers David Prothero Hankinson, The Queen's Royal Lancers.
- Maj Derek John Hudson, Royal Regiment of Artillery.
- Capt Gillian Anne Jenkins, The Royal Logistic Corps.
- Capt Andrew Philip Lambert, The Royal Logistic Corps.
- Capt Graham Stuart McLane, The Royal Logistic Corps.
- Maj John Christopher Petrie, Adjutant General's Corps.
- Maj Geoffrey Cyril Price, Royal Regiment of Artillery.
- WO Class 2 Adrian Leslie Roberts, Adjutant General's Corps.
- Staff Sgt James Timothy Sorbie, Adjutant General's Corps.
- WO Class 1 Nigel Christopher Stanton, The Royal Logistic Corps.
- Maj Robert Keith Tomlinson, Corps of Royal Engineers.
- Cpl Karen Yvonne Turner, Royal Corps of Signals.
- Maj James Graeme Wilford, The Parachute Regiment.
- WO Class 2 Sonia Louise Willett, Intelligence Corps.
- Capt David Christopher James Amlot, Army Air Corps.
- Maj Jeffery James Ashwell, Royal Corps of Signals.
- Maj John Leonard Atherton, The Royal Logistic Corps.
- Maj Keith Bell, Royal Corps of Signals.
- Maj Andrew David Bellingall, Corps of Royal Engineers.
- Maj Adrian John Betteridge, Corps of Royal Electrical and Mechanical Engineers.
- WO Class 1 Karen Blake, Adjutant General's Corps.
- Capt Timothy Edward Brown, The Royal Logistic Corps.
- Staff Sgt Stephen Dennis Bushnell, Corps of Royal Electrical and Mechanical Engineers.
- Sgt Sara Helen Cocks, Adjutant General's Corps.
- Acting Lt Col Frank Morton Frederick Cox, Middlesex and North West London Army Cadet Force.
- Maj Nicholas Charles Crawshaw, Army Air Corps.
- Maj Charles William Nepean Crewdson, 9th/12th Royal Lancers.
- Lance Cpl Royston Croker, The Royal Logistic Corps, Territorial Army.
- Capt Michael Frank Cross, Royal Army Medical Corps, Territorial Army.
- Acting Maj Derrick Alfred Davies, Hereford and Worcester Army Cadet Force.
- Maj Michael Davis, Royal Corps of Signals.
- Maj Alistair John Deas, The Royal Logistic Corps.
- Capt Wallace Rennie Donald, Corps of Royal Engineers, Territorial Army.
- WO Class 2 Michael Patrick Feehily, Royal Army Medical Corps, Territorial Army.
- Maj Rupert Angus Forrest, The Black Watch.
- WO Class 2 Michael Peter Fox, Coldstream Guards.
- Capt James William Leslie Frost, Royal Corps of Signals Territorial Army.
- WO Class 2 David Michael Fullman, Corps of Royal Electrical and Mechanical Engineers.
- Maj David Gagen, Corps of Royal Electrical and Mechanical Engineers.
- WO Class 1 Paul Goodwin, Corps of Army Music.
- Capt Christopher Melvyn Paul Gosling, Corps of Royal Engineers.
- Maj Michael Peter Hugh Gouldstone, The Royal Gurkha Rifles.
- WO Class 2 Duncan Ian Grassick, Grenadier Guards.
- Capt Stephen Thomas Griffiths, The East of England Regiment, Territorial Army.
- Lt Col David Norman Hamilton, Corps of Royal Engineers.
- WO Class 2 Anthony Frederick Hands, The Royal Green Jackets.
- WO Class 2 Nicholas Mark Harrison, 9th/12th Royal Lancers.
- Acting Maj Alexander Henderson, The Queen's Own Highlanders Battalion Army Cadet Force.
- WO Class 2 Gary Charlton Hendrickson, Army Physical Training Corps.
- WO Class 1 Bruce James Hitchings, BEM The Highlanders.
- Maj Richard Henry Horner, Royal Regiment of Artillery.
- WO Class 2 Christopher David Howitt, Adjutant General's Corps.
- Maj Simon George Hutchinson, Royal Corps of Signals.
- Maj Michael Cyril Jones, The Royal Logistic Corps.
- Acting Capt Peter Francis Kingston, Shropshire Army Cadet Force.
- Acting Lt Col Anthony James Ley, Devon Army Cadet Force.
- Maj Ian Patrick Licence, Corps of Royal Electrical and Mechanical Engineers.
- Capt Carl Harry Lomas, BEM The Royal Logistic Corps.
- Capt Steve Trevor Lonnen, The Royal Logistic Corps.
- Capt Helen Margaret Loughborough, Intelligence Corps.
- Sapper Christopher Jeffrey Mann, Corps of Royal Engineers.
- Maj Stephen Douglas Marcham, Grenadier Guards.
- WO Class 2 Michael Edward Mason, The Royal Regiment of Wales.
- Maj David Masters, The Royal Logistic Corps.
- Lance Bombardier Michael Joseph McDermott, Royal Regiment of Artillery.
- Cpl Alice Croy McGuire, The Royal Logistic Corps, Territorial Army.
- Maj Gerald Ian Mitchell, Corps of Royal Electrical and Mechanical Engineers.
- WO Class 2 Martin Colin Mogford, Corps of Royal Engineers.
- WO Class 1 Michael John Morgan, The Royal Rifle Volunteers, Territorial Army.
- Maj Alan William Murray, Adjutant General's Corps.
- Staff Sgt Timothy Francis O'Grady, Corps of Royal Engineers.
- WO Class 2 David Osborne, The Royal Logistic Corps.
- Maj Ronald Michael Owsley, The Royal Logistic Corps, Territorial Army.
- WO Class 1 Peter Alleyne Padley, Corps of Royal Electrical and Mechanical Engineers.
- WO Class 2 Robert Michael Parr, The Parachute Regiment.
- Colour Sgt David John Pearson, The Royal Anglian Regiment.
- Maj Richard Charles Perrett, Corps of Royal Electrical and Mechanical Engineers.
- WO Class 2 Hedley Lawrence Platts, QGM Intelligence Corps, Territorial Army.
- Acting Capt Susan Elizabeth Pratt, Norfolk Army Cadet Force.
- WO Class 2 Simeon Irving Prowse, Corps of Royal Electrical and Mechanical Engineers.
- Maj Laurence Thomas Quinn, Corps of Royal Engineers.
- Capt Felix Anthony Ralph, The Royal Anglian Regiment.
- Capt Brian Dennis Ransom, Royal Regiment of Artillery.
- WO Class 1 Alan David Robinson, Adjutant General's Corps.
- Maj Anthony Wetherall Russell, (The Princess of Wales's Royal Regiment)
- Capt Christopher John Sayer, The Royal Yeomanry, Territorial Army.
- Maj Keith Seddon, BEM The Worcestershire and Sherwood Foresters Regiment.
- Maj Harold Alexander Simpson, Adjutant General's Corps.
- Maj Michael John Smart, Royal Regiment of Artillery.
- Capt Albert Edward Smith, Irish Guards.
- Maj Jerome Niall Anthony Crichton-Stuart, Scots Guards.
- Staff Sgt Fitzroy Anthony Thomas, Royal Regiment of Artillery.
- Lt Col Ian Gordon Tritton, The Royal Welch Fusiliers.
- Maj Timothy Derek Vaughan, Corps of Royal Engineers
- Maj Anthony John Wakeman, Corps of Royal Engineers.
- Maj Jonathan Andrew Hallam Welch, Corps of Royal Engineers.
- Capt Alan Whittle, Army Air Corps.
- Maj Adrian Edward Alan Wilkinson, The Royal Logistic Corps.
- The Rev John Strettle Williams, Royal Army Chaplains' Department, Territorial Army.
- WO Class 2 Michael John Williams, Royal Tank Regiment.
- Capt David Wilson, BEM The Light Infantry.
- Maj Timothy George William Woodman, The Royal Logistic Corps

Air Force

- WO Mohamed Anwar Butt, Royal Air Force.
- Sqn Ldr Anthony Shaun Corbett, Royal Air Force.
- Junior Technician Steven Clarke Davis, Royal Air Force.
- Sqn Ldr Robert David Fallon, Royal Air Force.
- Sqn Ldr Andrew Philip Laws, Royal Air Force.
- Senior AC Scott Christian McClean, Royal Air Force.
- Cpl Laurie-An McConnell, Royal Air Force.
- Sqn Ldr Simon Andrew Moss Royal Air Force
- Sqn Ldr Timothy William Walker, Royal Air Force.
- Sqn Ldr Neil Cameron Wood, Royal Air Force.
- Chief Technician Eric Grant Anderson, Royal Air Force.
- WO David Andrew Angood, BEM Royal Air Force.
- Sqn Ldr Philip James Beach, Royal Air Force.
- Flt Lt Adrian Vincent Roland Bettridge, Royal Air Force.
- Sqn Ldr Peter Charles Brown, Royal Air Force.
- Sqn Ldr Gordon James Bruce, Royal Air Force.
- Sqn Ldr Terence Patrick Michael Cairns, Royal Air Force.
- Sqn Ldr David Peter Calvert, Royal Air Force.
- Flt Sgt Paul Coll, Royal Air Force.
- Sqn Ldr Frederick Allister Da Costa, Royal Air Force.
- Sqn Ldr Nigel Gillman Cryer, Royal Air Force.
- Sqn Ldr Colin Frederick Dooley, Royal Air Force.
- Wing Cdr Julian Gregory Eaton, Royal Air Force.
- Flt Sgt Paul Richard Emery, Royal Air Force.
- Cpl Leslie Allan Forsyth, Royal Air Force.
- Cpl Neil Galloway, Royal Air Force.
- Sqn Ldr Mark Yew Kong Ho, Royal Air Force.
- WO Peter John Hurt, BEM Royal Air Force.
- Sqn Ldr Warren Austin William James, Royal Air Force.
- Cpl Ian Michael Jebbett, Royal Air Force.
- Master Air Electronics Operator David Ian Jerry, Royal Air Force.
- Sqn Ldr James Bruce Johnston, Royal Air Force.
- Flt Sgt Deborah Massey, Royal Air Force.
- WO Anthony David Melville, BEM Royal Air Force.
- Sgt John Murray, Royal Air Force.
- Sqn Ldr Mark Lee Roberts, Royal Air Force.
- Flt Lt David Andrew Robinson, Royal Air Force.
- Sgt Steven John Scott, Royal Air Force.
- Flt Lt Godfrey Smith, Royal Air Force Volunteer Reserve.
- WO Christopher John Sparks, Royal Air Force.
- Sqn Ldr David Ronald Speed, Royal Air Force Volunteer Reserve.
- Sgt Sheena Tytheridge, Royal Air Force.
- Master Air Loadmaster Clive Unwin, Royal Air Force.
- Sqn Ldr Gareth David Vernon Williams, Royal Air Force.
- Cpl Darren John Wills, Royal Air Force.
- Flt Lt Phillip Wood, Royal Air Force.

Civil division

- Daniel Charters Adair. For services to Small Business. (Ballymena, Antrim)
- Roy Samuel Adam. For services to the community in Blandford Forum, Dorset. (Blandford Forum, Dorset)
- Mrs Jean Adamson, Author. For services to Children's Literature and to the community in Stretham, Cambridgeshire. (Ely, Cambridgeshire)
- Mrs Muibatu Adefioye, Support Grade Messenger, Home Office. (London, NW5)
- Mrs Kathleen Joy Adkins. For services to Elderly People in Hockley and Hawkwell, Essex. (Rayleigh, Essex)
- Ahmet Siyami Afacan, Head, Medical Service, British Coal. For services to Occupational Medicine. (Edwalton, Nottinghamshire)
- Mrs Isobel Aiken. For services to Education. (Ballymena, Antrim)
- Rutherford John Aitken. For services to the Lapwing Lodge Community Centre and to Young People in Peesweep, Paisley. (Paisley, Renfrewshire)
- Wilfrid Robert Lane Alcock, Constable, Devon and Cornwall Constabulary. For services to Young People in Brixham. (Brixham, Devon)
- Brian Allen. For services to Foxfield Light Railway Society Ltd. (Stoke-on-Trent, Staffordshire)
- Ian Carter Allin, Chief Technical Engineer, Agricultural Engineers Association. For services to the Agricultural Machinery Industry. (Peterborough, Cambridgeshire)
- Arthur Raymond Allison, Maintenance Joiner, Hartlepool and East Durham NHS Trust. For services to the NHS. (Hartlepool, Durham)
- Richard James Livingstone Altham. For services to Young People and to Book Aid. (Hitchin, Hertfordshire)
- Mrs Indu Anand, Lately Member, Harmondsworth Visiting Committee. For services to the community. (Slough, Berkshire)
- Mrs Farida Anderson. For services to the Partners of Prisoners and Families Support Group. (Manchester, Greater Manchester)
- Mrs June Anderson. For charitable services to the community. (Belfast)
- Mrs Meverly Judy Anderson, Personal Secretary, H.M. Board of Inland Revenue. (London, SW12)
- Michael John Anderson. For services to Agriculture and the Norfolk Agriculture Station. (Norwich, Norfolk)
- Vera Margaret Anderson. For services to Guiding in Aberdeen. (Aberdeen)
- Vivian Alexander Anderson. For services to Association Football. Altrincham, Cheshire
- Kenneth Andrews. For services to the Princess Marina Hospital, Northampton. (Northampton, Northamptonshire)
- Mrs Elaine Appelbee. For services to the Centenary to Millennium Award Scheme. (Keighley, West Yorkshire)
- Ashley Arbon. For services to the Whittlesford Village Hall Project, Cambridgeshire. (Whittlesford, Cambridgeshire)
- Mrs Joan Kathleen Archer, lecturer in Creative Studies, South Trafford College. For services to Further Education. (Stockport, Cheshire)
- Mrs Margaret Mary Murray Archibald. For services to the community in Inverkeithing, Fife. (Inverkeithing, Fife)
- Mrs Vanessa Aris, Chairman of Governors, Belmont School, Cheltenham. For services to Education. (Cheltenham, Gloucestershire
- Brian Armstrong, Lately Prison Officer, HM Prison Durham, Prison Service, Home Office. (Darlington, Durham)
- Leon Victor Armstrong. For services to the British Pensacola Veterans' Association. (London, E11)
- Mrs Sylvia Elizabeth Armstrong. For services to the Household and Farming Museum, Earle Hill, Northumberland. (Alnwick, Northumberland)
- Mrs Marjorie Helen Arnfield. For services to Art in Nottinghamshire. (Southwell, Nottinghamshire)
- Mrs Joan Lesley Arnott, Business Manager, Department of Health. (Leeds, West Yorkshire)
- Kenneth Ash. For services to Sport and to Young People in Guildford, Surrey. (Guildford, Surrey)
- Mary Louisa Ashby, MVO. For services to Petworth Cottage Nursing Home and to the British Red Cross in West Sussex. (Petworth, West Sussex)
- Mrs Kathleen Muriel Ashcroft. For services to the Citizens Advice Bureau and to the community in Leeds. (Leeds, West Yorkshire)
- Mrs Mary Ashcroft, For services to Crown Green Ladies' Bowls. (Warrington, Cheshire)
- Mrs Dorothy Rose Ashmore, Leader, Great Ryburgh Youth Club, Norfolk. For services to Young People. (Fakenham, Norfolk)
- Mohammed Aslam. BEM. For services to the Ethnic community in West Yorkshire. (Halifax, West Yorkshire)
- Angela Denise Atkinson, Member, Leeds City Council. For services to the community. (Leeds, West Yorkshire)
- Michael Broadbent Atkinson, Volunteer Leading Firefighter, North Yorkshire Fire and Rescue Service. For services to the Fire Service. (Goathland, North Yorkshire)
- Arthur Harry George Attwood, Local Historian. For services to the community in Basingstoke, Hampshire. (Basingstoke, Hampshire)
- John Malcolm Aulton, Area Co-ordinator, Duke of Edinburgh Award Scheme, Walsall. For services to Young People. (Cannock, West Midlands)
- Rohinton Framoze (Ruby) Austin, Dental Practitioner. For services to the Anglo-Asian Odontological Group. (Beckenham, Kent)
- Mrs Anne Aylmore. For services to the Baby Clinic in Angmering, West Sussex. (Angmering, West Sussex)
- Joyce Baccus, JP. For services to Community Relations in Brent, London. (Wembley, Middlesex)
- Roy Bailey, Folk Singer and Musician. For services to Folk Music. (Sheffield, South Yorkshire)
- Colin Andrew David Baillie, Assistant Rector, Millburn Academy. For services to Education and to Schools' Rugby in the North of Scotland. (Inverness)
- Gwendolyn Ethel Baker, JP. For services to the Lowestoft Hospital League of Friends, Suffolk. (Lowestoft, Suffolk)
- Alan James Ball, Member, England Team, World Cup 1966. For services to Association Football. (Warsash, Hampshire)
- Anthony Ball, Committee Services Officer, Environment Agency. For services to the Environment. (Birmingham, West Midlands)
- Mrs Opal Bandoo, Client Adviser, Employment Service, Department for Education and Employment. (London, SW16)
- John Martin Bannister, Principal Lecturer and director of Music, Bishop Grosseteste College, Lincoln. For services to Music Education. (Lincoln, Lincolnshire)
- Mrs Naomi Boodnie Bannister, Lately Senior Personal secretary to The Lord Chief Justice of England and Wales. (South Croydon, Surrey)
- John Bannon, JP, Non-Executive Trustee, North Glasgow University Hospitals NHS Trust. For services to Patient Care and to the community. (Knightswood, Glasgow)
- Julia Barfield, Architect. For services to the British Airways London Eye. (London, SW4)
- George Michael Aldus Barker, Co-ordinator, English Nature Urban Programme. For services to Nature Conservation. (Peterborough, Cambridgeshire)
- Susan Barker. For services to Sport and to Broadcasting. (Chiddeningfield, Surrey)
- Joseph Barlas. For services to the Inverclyde Voluntary Council of Social Services. (Greenock, Renfrewshire)
- Thomas George Barnden. For services to the Royal Naval Association in Kent. (Dartford, Kent)
- Graham Grosvenor Barnes, Head, Electricity Trading (Scotland), British Energy. For services to the Nuclear Industry. (Newton Mearns, Renfrewshire)
- Mrs Sylvia Rose Barnes. For services to Show Jumping. (Alton, Hampshire)
- Mrs Linda Diane Barnett, Lately Higher Executive Officer, Benefits Agency, Department of Social Security. (Horsham, West Sussex)
- Michael Philip Barnsley, Technical Specialist, Vehicle Management Systems, Smiths Industries Aerospace. For services to the Aerospace Industry. (Cheltenham, Gloucestershire)
- Mrs Frances Celia Ann Barr, Lately Chairman, Pilning and Severn Beach Parish Council, Gloucestershire. For services to the community. (Severn Beach, South Gloucestershire)
- Michael Barraclough. For services to the community in the East End of London. (London, E14)
- Hayden John Barrett. For services to The Prince's Trust in Grampian and Shetland. (Ellon, Aberdeenshire)
- John Andrew Cecil Barrington. For services to the Leukaemia Research Fund in Richmond, Surrey. (London, SW12)
- Mrs Yvonne Barrow, Honorary Secretary, Carib Charitable Trust. For services to Community Relations. (London, SW16)
- Mrs Anna Maria Bartholomew, Manager, Tourist Information Centre, Harwich Parkeston Quay. For services to Tourism in Essex. (Harwich, Essex)
- Margaret Ann Bartlett. For services to Sport and Recreation in Lightwater, Surrey. (Lightwater, Surrey)
- Trevor George Bartlett, Founder, East Devon Wildlife Rescue Centre. For services to Animal Welfare. (Exmouth, Devon)
- Mrs Barbara May Barton. For services to Mentally Ill People in Nottingham. (Nottingham, Nottinghamshire)
- Anthony Bruce Bates, Lately Senior Professional and Technology Officer, Ministry of Defence. (Dibden Purlieu, Hampshire)
- James William Bates. For services to the community in Deighton, West Yorkshire. (Huddersfield, West Yorkshire)
- Joan Elizabeth Batte. For services to the Royal British Legion in Gwynedd. (Bala, Gwynedd)
- Paul John Battrick. For services to the community on Jersey. (St Helier, Jersey)
- Mrs Ella Baxter. For services to the community. (Omagh, Tyrone)
- Derek Ernest Bayliss. For services to Young People, especially Scouting, in Bristol. (Saltford, Bristol)
- Benjamin William Bazeley. For services to disabled people in India. (Shrewsbury, Shropshire)
- Patrick Beasley, For services to the community in Bournville, Birmingham. (Birmingham, West Midlands)
- Ronald Beasley, Vice Chairman, Visiting Committee, Polmont Young Offenders' Institution. For services to Prisoners' Welfare. (Edinburgh)
- William McNicol Beaugie. For services to people with Multiple Sclerosis and their Carers in the Scottish Borders. (Dumfries)
- Trevor Lawrence Beaven, Station Supervisor, Great Western Trains. For services to Pewsey Railway Station, Wiltshire. (Pewsey, Wiltshire)
- Gerald Francis Beck, Lieutenant Commander, Training Ship Broadsword, Hendon. For services to Young People. (London, NW9)
- John Scott Bedlington. For services to people with Asbestos Related Diseases. (Washington, Tyne and Wear)
- Mrs Edith Winifred Belcher. For services to the community in North Bradley, Wiltshire. (Trowbridge, Wiltshire)
- Robert Joseph Belding. For services to the Carers' National Association. (Stourport-on-Severn, Worcestershire)
- Mrs Elspeth Bell. For services to the community in Coldstream and Cornhill-on-Tweed, Northumberland. (Cornhill on Tweed, Northumberland)
- Mrs Isabella McArthur Bell. For services to the War Widows' Association in Cheshire. (Chester, Cheshire)
- James More Bell, JP. For services to Patient Care in Lanarkshire. (Airdrie, Lanarkshire)
- John Robin Sinclair Bell, Scottish Charities Nominee. For services to Scottish Charities. (Edinburgh)
- Mrs Meredyth Cheryl Bell, Dental Practitioner, Cumbria. For services to Standards in Dentistry. (Cockermouth, Cumbria)
- Arthur Rowland Benson. For services to the 68th Nottingham (John Buchan Handicapped) Group Scouting Association. (Mapperley, Nottinghamshire)
- Mrs Elizabeth Benson, Lately Production/Training Supervisor. For services to Remploy in Motherwell, Lanarkshire. (Bellshill, Lanarkshire)
- Mrs Gwenyth Benson. For services to Relate in Staffordshire. (Rugeley, Staffordshire)
- Mrs Margaret Benyon, Holographic Artist. For services to Art. (Broadstone, Dorset)
- Mrs June Mary Berkovitch. For services to the Citizen's Advice Bureau Movement and to MENCAP. (Hemel Hempstead, Hertfordshire)
- Anthony Berrington. For services to the community, especially to learning disabled and mentally disabled people in Reading and Wokingham. (Reading, Berkshire)
- Mrs Gwenllian Mair Best, Head of Therapies and Related Services, North Glamorgan NHS Trust. For services to Occupational Therapy. (Heolgerrig, Merthyr Tydfil)
- Mrs Sylvia Josephine Best, Administrative Support and Client Services Officer, Durham Constabulary. For services to the Police. (Richmond, North Yorkshire)
- Mrs Ruth Mary Bettle. For services to the community in Havant, Hampshire. (Havant, Hampshire)
- Mrs Stella Gwendoline Capo-Bianco. For services to the Ringing in the Millennium Project. (Horsham, West Sussex)
- Barrie John Biddulph, National Treasurer. For services to the Police Federation of England and Wales. (London)
- Brian Alfred Billing. For services to Community Art in Milton Keynes, Buckinghamshire. (Milton Keynes, Buckinghamshire)
- Mrs Theresa Maureen Billingham, Home Care Assistant. For services to the community in Cambridgeshire. (Cambridge, Cambridgeshire)
- Rodney Joseph Birchall, Professional Technical Officer, Daresbury Laboratory. For services to Scientific Research. (Warrington, Cheshire)
- Elizabeth Bird, Senior Lecturer in Continuing Education, University of Bristol. For services to Higher Education. (Bristol, Somerset)
- David Plunkett Black, BEM. For services to the Control of River Pollution in Scotland. (Edinburgh)
- Euphemia Stewart Black, Lately Headteacher, Achaleven Primary School, Argyllshire. For services to Education. (Oban, Argyll and Bute)
- Professor Jeremy Martin Black. For services to the design of the Millennium Postage Stamps. (Exeter, Devon)
- Malcolm Harold Blackburn, JP. For services to the community in Clitheroe, Lancashire. (Clitheroe, Lancashire)
- The Rev John David Bland. For services to the community in Derby. Derby, Derbyshire
- Michael Richard Eric Blandford, Export Marketing Consultant. For services to Export. Wedmore, Somerset Derbyshire
- Mrs Norma Gwendoline Blease, Administrative Officer, Ministry of Defence. (Wokingham, Berkshire)
- David Blomfield. For services to the community in Richmond, Surrey. (Richmond, Surrey)
- Michael Boon. For services to Journalism in Wales.
- Mrs Barbara Anne Booth, Headteacher, Shadsworth Infant School, Blackburn, Lancashire. For services to Education and to the community. (Colne, Lancashire)
- Mrs Mary Lorna Booth. For services to the community in Leadenham, Lincolnshire. (Leadenham, Lincolnshire)
- Annie Marjory Boreland. For services to the Agriculture Research Institute. (Hillsborough, Down)
- Mrs Elizabeth Bott. For services to Community Relations in Chester and Cheshire. (Chester, Cheshire)
- Hugh John Boulter. For services to the National Advisory Council of Boards of Visitors and H.M. Remand Centre Reading. (Reading, Berkshire)
- Mrs Sheila Elizabeth Millikin Bowcock. For services to Fostering in Reading, Berkshire. (Reading, Berkshire)
- Gwilym Arthur Bowden. For services to the NHS and to the community in Neath, South Wales. (Bryncoch, Neath Port Talbot)
- James Thomas Bown, Client Adviser, Dorchester Job Centre. For services to Unemployed People. (Dorcester, Dorset)
- Jesse Joseph Bowyer. For services to the community, especially the Royal British Legion, in Great and Little Wratting, Suffolk. (Haverhill, Suffolk)
- Stanley Walter Box, Stationery Stores Administration assistant, H.M. Board of Customs and Excise. (Harwich, Essex)
- Max Boyce. For services to Entertainment. (Glyn Neath, Neath Port Talbot)
- Elisabeth Boyle, Senior Probation Officer. For services to the Inner London Probation Service. (London, SW18)
- Arthur John Boyles. For services to the Appledore Band, Devon. (Bideford, Devon)
- Christopher Bradbury. For services to the community in Great Haywood, Staffordshire. (Nr Stafford, Staffordshire)
- Michael Carl Bradley, General Secretary, General Federation of Trade Unions. For services to Employment Relations. (Northampton, Northamptonshire)
- Paul Weston Bragg, Sub Officer, Staffordshire Fire and Rescue Service. For services to Fire Safety Education. (Stoke-on-Trent, Staffordshire)
- Mrs Kate Braithwaite. For services to the Rural Community and to the Environment. (Kendal, Cumbria)
- Mrs Dorothy Jill Brame. For services to the Brentford and Chiswick Victim Support Scheme. (Near Chichester, West Sussex)
- Mrs Ethelca Brand. For services to Community Relations. (London, W3)
- Janice Margaret Bray, Director, County Durham Careers Service. For services to the Careers Service. (Peterlee, Durham)
- Colin Brereton. For services to Fire Prevention. (Stoke-on-Trent, Staffordshire)
- David Brewin, Water Quality Manager, Midlands Region Environment Agency. For services to Environmental Management. (Solihull, West Midlands)
- Alan Arthur Brewster. For services to Industrial Training and to the community in South Tyneside. (South Shields, Tyne and Wear)
- Kenneth Leslie Bridges, Governor, Camden Junior School, London Borough of Sutton. For services to Education. (Carshalton, Surrey)
- Mrs Barbara Brierley, Customer Service Manager, H.M. Board of Inland Revenue. (Oldham, Greater Manchester)
- Arthur Briggs. For services to Lancaster City Council and to the community. (Carnforth, Lancashire)
- Mrs Ann Mary Bright. For services to the Citizens Advice Bureau in Braintree, Essex. (Braintree, Essex)
- Maurice Michael Bristow. For services to Leeds Castle and to the community in Leeds, Kent. (Maidstone, Kent)
- Terence Malcolm Broad, Teacher, Newquay Treviglas School, Cornwall. For services to Schools' Cricket. (Newquay, Cornwall)
- Audrey Bronstein. For services to OXFAM. (Oxford, Oxfordshire)
- Alan Brown, JP. For services to the Voluntary Sector. (Barnet, Hertfordshire)
- Ann Brown. For services to Disadvantaged People. (Belfast)
- George Edward Brown, Senior Planning Engineering, Royal Ordnance, BAe. For services to the Defence Industry. (Highbridge, Somerset)
- Howard George William Brown. For services to the Citizens Advice Bureau in Crawley, West Sussex. (East Grinstead, West Sussex)
- Hugh Davey Brown. Executive Officer, Ministry of Defence. (London, SE5)
- Mrs Kay Brown. For services to the Civil Service Retirement Fellowship in Glasgow. (Glasgow)
- Mrs Margaret Brown, School Crossing Patrol, Blackpool, Lancashire. For services to Road Safety. (Blackpool, Lancashire)
- Mrs Rebecca Brown, Professional Development Nurse, Leicester General Hospital. For services to Nursing. (Burton Overy, Leicestershire)
- Robert Alexander Brown. For charitable services to the community in Cranham, Gloucestershire. (Cranham, Gloucestershire)
- Simon John Brown, Lately Principal Engineer, London Transport Buses. For services to London Transport. (Hassocks, West Sussex)
- Stewart Lewellyn Brown. For services to Promoting Race Relations in Sheffield. (Sheffield, South Yorkshire)
- Mrs Patricia Browning. For services to the community, especially the WRVS, in East Yorkshire. (Hornsea, East Riding of Yorkshire)
- Mrs Frances Buckler, Business Improvement Director. For services to Rolls-Royce plc. (Troon, Ayrshire and Arran)
- Richard Charles Budd, Surveyor, H.M. Board of Customs and Excise. (Blackburn, Lancashire)
- Stephen George Bull. For services to Association Football. (Cannock, Staffordshire)
- Mrs Catherine Euphemia Simpson Burgess. For services to Patient Welfare at Lennox Castle Hospital, Dunbartonshire. (Campsie Glen, Dunbartonshire)
- Patricia Lorraine Burke, Personal Secretary, Home Office. (London, N9)
- Mrs Doreen Burn, Local Officer 1, Benefits Agency, Department of Social Security. (Morpeth, Northumberland)
- Ruby Burn, Lately Requirements Team Leader, H.M. Board of Inland Revenue. (Newcastle upon Tyne, Tyne and Wear)
- Gordon Robert Burnett. For services to the community in Lutterworth, Leicestershire. (Lutterworth, Leicestershire)
- Robert Burns, Commandant, Queen Street Company, Glasgow. For services to the St. Andrew's Ambulance Association. (Hamilton, Lanarkshire)
- Thomas Patrick Burr, Associations Liaison Secretary, National Trust. For services to Conservation. (Castle Cary, Somerset)
- Mrs Margaret Frances Burrows, Payroll Services Manager. For services to London Transport. (St Albans, Hertfordshire)
- Mrs Glenda Burton. For services to Fostering in Penrith, Cumbria. (Appleby, Cumbria)
- Mrs Joyce Burton. For services to the Burton Music Festival, Burton on Trent, Staffordshire. (Burton on Trent, Staffordshire)
- Mrs Susan Ann Burton, JP. For services to the Administration of Justice and to the National Autistic Society. (Eastbourne, East Sussex)
- Mrs Velda Roseline Burton, Station Warden, Ministry of Defence. (London)
- Anthony Edward Bush, Station Officer, Auxiliary Coastguard Service, Winterton, Norfolk. For services to Marine Safety. (Great Yarmouth, Norfolk)
- Kathleen Caldwell. For services to the Voluntary Sector. (Pennyburn, Londonderry)
- Gertrude Anestasia Campbell, Resident Warden, Isleden House. For services to the community in London. (London, N1)
- Gesto Jose Cancela, Head Chef, Woking Community Hospital, Surrey. For services to the NHS. (Virginia Water, Surrey)
- Mrs Maria Therese Cape, Secretary, Campaign Against Drinking and Driving. For services to Road Safety. (Newcastle upon Tyne, Tyne and Wear)
- Margaret Mary Carleton. For services to the Community of Reconciliation and Fellowship in Hackney, London. (London, E9)
- Mrs Irene Carling. For services to MENCAP in South Hams, Devon. (Kingsbridge, Devon)
- Jean Margaret, Countess of Carnarvon. For services to the community in Newbury, Berkshire. (Newbury, Berkshire)
- Mrs Teresa Irene Carne. For services to Stoma Care and Colerectal Nursing. (Plymouth, Devon)
- Capt Robert Sydney Carrington. For services to the Church Army in East Sussex. (Seaford, East Sussex)
- Thomas Harry Carroll, Managing Director, Laing Partnership Housing. For services to Urban Regeneration and Construction Training in London. (Hoddesdon, Hertfordshire)
- Mrs Cora Carter, Secretary, Tenants' and Residents' Organisations of England. For services to Housing Tenants. (Huddersfield, West Yorkshire)
- Jill Carter. For services to the Community Practitioners' and Health Visitors' Association. (London, SW16)
- Mrs June Allinson Carter. For services to Diabetic Nursing in West Yorkshire. (Batley, West Yorkshire)
- Thomas William Cartwright. For services to Cricket Coaching in Wales. (Neath Port Talbot)
- Donal Casey. For services to Housing. (Londonderry)
- Raymond Jack Chandler. For services to the community in Wychavon and Bredon, Gloucestershire. (Tewkesbury, Gloucestershire)
- Arunasalam Chandramohan. For services to the Institute of Biology. (Carshalton Beeches, Surrey)
- Mrs Elizabeth Anne Chapallaz, Senior Nurse, Medicine Services, Lister Hospital, Stevenage. For services to Nursing. (Hitchin, Hertfordshire)
- Graeme Herbert Chapman. For charitable services to Children in Need. (Dolphinholme, Lancashire)
- Timothy Gavin Andrews Chappell. For services to the community, especially the Wellbeing of Yeovil Association in Yeovil, Somerset. (Sherborne, Dorset)
- Mrs Eileen Charleton. For services to the British Red Cross Society. (Omagh, Tyrone)
- Christopher John Chatfield, Administrative Officer, Department of the Environment, Transport and the Regions. (Bristol)
- Mrs Joan Elizabeth Cheetham, Chair, Shelford and Newton Parish Council, Nottinghamshire. For services to the community. (Shelford, Nottinghamshire)
- Mrs Margaret Bibby-Cheshire. For services to the RNLI and the Soldiers', Sailors' and Airmen's Families Association in Norfolk. (Gorleston, Norfolk)
- Geoffrey Chester, Principal Officer, HM Prison Gartree, Prison Service, Home Office. (Market Harborough, Leicestershire)
- Hukam Chand Chopra. For charitable services in Barnet, London. (New Barnet, Hertfordshire)
- Michael Watt Christie. For services to Patient Welfare at Woodend Hospital, Stonehaven, Kincardineshire. (Stonehaven, Kincardineshire)
- William Walker Christie, Lately Head of Chemistry. For services to the Scottish Crop Research Institute. (West Ferry, Dundee)
- Ian Clague, Musical Director, Manx National Youth Band. For services to Music on the Isle of Man. (Douglas, Isle of Man)
- Albert Clark. For services to the community in Leicester. (Leicester, Leicestershire)
- Mrs Jane Olwynne Clark, Headteacher, Clippens School, Linwood, Renfrewshire. For services to those with Special Educational Needs. (Stewarton, Ayrshire and Arran)
- Mrs Margaret Phyllis Clark, Special Educational Needs Co-ordinator, Christ Church High School, Ashford, Kent. For services to Education. (Ashford, Kent)
- Mrs Beatrice Clarke. For services to the community in Braybrooke, Leicestershire. (Harborough, Leicestershire)
- Mrs Freda May Clarke. For services to Athletics. (Leeds, West Yorkshire)
- Kathleen Mary Clarke. For services to the community, especially disabled people, in Salisbury, Wiltshire. (Salisbury, Wiltshire)
- Kenneth John Clarke. For services to the Newquay Victim Support Scheme, Cornwall. (Newquay, Cornwall)
- Mrs Virginia Cloke. For services to SENSE. (Gloucester, Gloucestershire)
- Benjamin Allan Clough. For services to the community in Glusburn, West Yorkshire. (Keighley, West Yorkshire)
- Mrs Mary Clough. For services to the community in Greater Manchester. (Stalybridge, Cheshire)
- Alan Gray Clouston. For services to the Millennium Celebrations on the Orkney Islands. (Orphir, Orkney)
- David Russell Clue, Milkman. For services to the community in Menheniot, Cornwall. (Liskeard, Cornwall)
- Thomas Mason Coates, Manager, Lincoln Urban Challenge. For services to the community. (Lincoln, Lincolnshire)
- Richard Andrew Coffey, Project Manager. For services to the Millennium Dome. (Redhill, Surrey)
- George Reginald Cohen, Member, England Team, World Cup 1966. For services to Association Football. (Tunbridge Wells, Kent)
- Pamela Fickus Colam. For services to the Chapel of St. Wilfrid, Church Norton, West Sussex. (Chichester, West Sussex)
- Maj Adrian Harcourt Coles, TD, Vice-Chairman, South Shropshire District Council. For services to the community. (Ludlow, Shropshire)
- Mrs Mavis Grace Coles, Usher, Reading Crown Court, Lord Chancellor's Department. (Reading, Berkshire)
- Mrs Valerie Marguerite Collacott. For services to Leprosy Relief. (Exmouth, Devon)
- Robert Kenneth Connell. Manager, Edinburgh Dog and Cat Home. For services to Animal Welfare. (Edinburgh)
- Frederic John Cook. For services to the Natural Environment Research Council Airborne Remote Sensing Facility. (Northampton, Northamptonshire)
- Peter John Cook. For services to the Withernsea Milliennium Green Project, East Yorkshire. (Withernsea, East Riding of Yorkshire)
- Michael Sydney Mears Cooper. For services to the Royal Naval Association in West Yorkshire. (Bradford, West Yorkshire)
- Leonard George Corbin. For services to the community on Guernsey. (Guernsey, Channel Islands)
- Mrs Theresa Cossey. For services to the Big C Appeal, Norfolk. (Norwich, Norfolk)
- David John Cosstick, Inspector, West Yorkshire Police. For services to Life Saving. (Leeds, West Yorkshire)
- Mrs Elizabeth Faith Cotter, Member, Mental Welfare Commission for Scotland. For services to Mental Welfare. (Aberfoyle, Stirling and Falkirk)
- Andrew George Cottington, Executive Officer, Ministry of Defence. (North Harrow, Middlesex)
- Gervase Cowell. For services to the Special Forces Club. (Cheam, Surrey)
- John David Cowell. For services to The Labrador Rescue Trust. (Bruton, Somerset)
- Thomas Stanton Jones Cowell. For services to the community and the Church of England on the Isle of Man. (West Baldwin, Isle of Man)
- Mrs Margaret Dora Cox. For services to Kingston Welcare and to Guiding in New Malden, Surrey. (New Malden, Surrey)
- Mrs Philippa Farquhar Raymond-Cox. For services to Improving Access for Disabled People. (London, W2)
- Sheamus Cox. For services to Further and Higher Education. (Kilfennan, Londonderry)
- David Charles Cozens. For services to the community, especially the National Association of Boys' Clubs, in Lyme Regis, Dorset. (Lyme Regis, Dorset)
- David Beresford Cragg, Chief Executive, Birmingham and Solihull Training and Enterprise Council. For services to Training and Education. (Birmingham, West Midlands)
- Leslie MacDonald Craig. For services to Piping and to the community in Inveraray, Argyllshire. (Furnace, Argyll and Bute)
- Mrs Maureen Crank, Director, After Adoption. For services to Adoption in Manchester. (Stockport, Greater Manchester)
- Bernard Cranmer. For services to the Ingatestone Boys' Own Club, Essex. (Ingatestone, Essex)
- Mrs Barbara Creighton. For services to the Health Service. (Enniskillen, Fermanagh)
- Thomas William Derrick Crisfield. For services to Stoke Mandeville Hospital, Buckinghamshire. (Aylesbury, Buckinghamshire)
- Terence William Crofts, Sub Officer, Derbyshire Fire and Rescue Service. For services to Fire Service Training. (Staveley, Derbyshire)
- David Eardley Cleave Cross, Project Manager, Military Space UK Directorate, Matra Marconi Space UK Ltd. For services to the Defence Industry. (Letchworth, Hertfordshire)
- Alan Crossley, Collection Caseworker, H.M. Board of Inland Revenue. (Leeds, West Yorkshire)
- Mrs Valerie Cumming. For services to the community in Sarratt, Hertfordshire. (Rickmansworth, Hertfordshire)
- Mrs Vanessa Sylvia Cunningham. For services to Cardiff University. (Llandaff, Cardiff)
- Peter Laurence Cunnington. For services to Meteorology in Cheshire. (Cheshire)
- John Frederick Cuthbert, Senior Conservator, Guildhall Library, London. For services to Libraries and Archivism. (Reigate, Surrey)
- Mrs Joan Cutts. For services to the Egg Crafters' Guild of Great Britain. (North Shields, Tyne and Wear)
- Sylvia Olive Dale. For services to Dance in Hammersmith and Fulham, London. (London, SW6)
- Frank Harold Daniels. For services to the community in Loughton, Milton Keynes, Buckinghamshire. (Milton Keynes, Buckinghamshire)
- Mrs Kathleen Marguerita Daniels. For services to the community in Newcastle-under-Lyme, Staffordshire. (Newcastle-under-Lyme, Staffordshire)
- Maria Daniels, Senior Personal Secretary, Cabinet Office. (London, SE20)
- Alan Michael Darlow. For charitable services to the community in South Wales. (Caerleon, Monmouthshire)
- Mrs Ann Davey. For services to the community in Ware, Hertfordshire. (Ware, Hertfordshire)
- Keith Morgan Davies. For services to Sport for Young People in Pontyclun, South Wales. (Talbot Green, Rhondda Cynon Taff)
- Mrs Margaret Lesley Wynne-Davies. For services to the Friends of the Public Record Office. (London, SE7)
- Noel Arthur Davies. For services to No 68 Squadron Association. (Ascot, Berks)
- Peter Davies, Captain, 2nd Sutton-in-Ashfield Boys' Brigade Company, Nottinghamshire. For services to Young People. (Mansfield, Nottinghamshire)
- Cdr Roy Joseph Davies. For services to the community in Shepton Mallet, Somerset. (Shepton Mallet, Somerset)
- Neville Davis. For services to Medicine. (Arkley, Hertfordshire)
- Mrs Patricia Davis. For services to head Injury Patients in Dumfries and Galloway. (Kirkcudbrightshire, Dumfries)
- Duncan Hugh Terrett Day. For services to the community in Newmarket, Suffolk. (Bury St Edumund's, Suffolk)
- Mrs Marie De Garis. For services to the Promotion of the Guernsey local language. (Guernsey, Channel Islands)
- Mrs Margory De Rola Adams. For services to the Royal Marsden Hospital League of Friends. (London, SW7)
- Mrs Eileen Mary Denman. For services to the Sheffield Bach Society, South Yorkshire. (Sheffield, South Yorkshire)
- Mrs Margaret Boulton Dennis. For services to the community, especially Saint Catherine's Hospice, in Scarborough, North Yorkshire. (Scarborough, North Yorkshire)
- Jean Annamarie Denye. For services to Homeless People and to the community in Leicestershire. (Kibworth Harcourt, Leicestershire)
- Mrs Pauline Elizabeth Devlin, Supervising Usher, Manchester Crown Court, Lord Chancellor's Department. (Prestwich, Greater Manchester)
- Thomas Devlin. For services to Public Transport and to charities. (London)
- Mrs Margaret Dexter, Revenue Officer, H.M. Board of Inland Revenue. (Leicestershire)
- Mrs Elsie Maye Dicks. For services to Local Government and the community in Rushden, Northamptonshire. (Rushden, Northamptonshire)
- Mary Eileen Annals Dickson. For charitable services to the community in Salisbury, Wiltshire. (Salisbury, Wiltshire)
- Ian Anthony Patmore Dillow, JP. For services to Health Charities. (Winchester, Hampshire)
- James Dixon. For services to Industry. (Belfast)
- Mrs Betty Christine Dockney, Head, Faculty of Foundation Studies, The College of West Anglia. For services to Further Education for People with Special Needs. (King's Lynn, Norfolk)
- Mrs Doreen Dolby, Nursing Auxiliary, Papworth Hospital. For services to Health Care. (Peterborough, Cambridgeshire)
- Shirley Margaret Doncaster, Local Officer 2, Department of Social Security. (Grantham, Lincolnshire)
- Mrs Sylvia Patricia Marie Doran. For services to Housing. (Belfast)
- The Rev Fr Andrew Gordon Alfonso Dorricott. For services to the community in Rayleigh, Essex. (Rayleigh, Essex)
- Keith Douglas, Reactor Production and Refuelling Manager, Devonport Management Ltd. For services to the Defence Industry. (Plymouth, Devon)
- William Ramsay Dow, Director, Scottish Coal Ltd. For services to the Mining Industry in Scotland. (Crossford, Fife)
- Michael McMullan Drake. For services to Journalism. (Downpatrick, Down)
- John Winston Draper. For services to Young People and to the Rotary Movement in Banstead, Surrey. (Horley, Surrey)
- Eileen Joan Drinkall, Payroll and Pensions Officer. For services to the Lancashire Fire and Rescue Service. (Preston, Lancashire)
- Betty Mary Driver, Actress. For services to Entertainment. (Altrincham, Cheshire)
- Mrs Joan Dudley. For services to the WRVS at the Rutherglen Maternity Hospital, Glasgow. (Glasgow)
- Edward Stanley Dummer. For services to the community in Midhurst, West Sussex. (Midhurst, West Sussex)
- William Louis Dunbar. For services to Education. (Belfast)
- Brian Suffern Duncan, Daffodil Breeder. For services to Horticulture and to the Daffodil and Tulip Committee of the Royal Horticultural Society.
- James William Howieson Duncan. For services to people with Multiple Sclerosis Ayrshire. (West Kilbride, Ayrshire and Arran)
- Mrs Elizabeth Jane Dunlop, Owner, Auchtermuchty Holiday Homes. For services to Tourism in Scotland. (Auchtermuchty, Fife)
- Brian John Dunn. For services to the Noctorum Company, 1st Chester Battalion, Church Lads' and Girls' Brigade, Birkenhead, Merseyside. (Birkenhead, Merseyside)
- Hazel Mary Dunn, Senior Clerk, Hawkesford Ltd. For services to the Building Industry. (Market Drayton, Shropshire)
- Mrs Valerie Dunne, JP. For services to the YMCA and to the community. (Bangor, Down)
- Mrs Jo Durdy. For services to the Acacia Road Home in Doncaster. (Doncaster, South Yorkshire)
- Ian Langton Durham. For services to the community in Chew Magna, Somerset. (Chew Magna, Somerset)
- Violet Durkan. For services to the community. (Newry, Down)
- Roy Walter Dutton. For services to the community, especially Boys' Clubs, in Worthing, West Sussex. (Worthing, West Sussex)
- Xavier-Michel Duverger. For services to the community in Weston-Super-Mare, Somerset. (Weston-Super-Mare, Somerset)
- Philip Desmond Dye, AFC, Experimental Test Pilot, BAe. For services to the Defence Industry. (Preston, Lancashire)
- Mrs Jillian Dyer, Member, Wythall Parish Council, Worcestershire. For services to the community. (Wythall, Worcestershire)
- Scilla Dyke, Dance Consultant. For services to Dance. (Woodbridge, Suffolk)
- Colin Dyson. For services to the community in Eastwood, Nottinghamshire. (Nottingham, Nottinghamshire)
- Paul James McGregor Eadie. For services to Export to Brazil. (Antrobus, Cheshire)
- John Wilson Eaton, Member, Inland Waterways Amenity Advisory Council. For services to Inland Waterways. (Southport, Merseyside)
- Mrs Molly Frances Ebdon. For services to WRVS in Hampshire. (Fleet, Hampshire)
- Colin Edward. For services to the Gateway Club, Cheshunt and District, Hertfordshire. (Waltham Cross, Hertfordshire)
- Mrs Avril Edwards, Nurse, City Hospital, Birmingham. For services to Nursing. (Birmingham, West Midlands)
- Mrs Suzanne Elliot. For services to Disabled Sport.
- Thomas Elliott, BEM, Driver, Ministry of Defence. (Armagh City, Armagh)
- James Herbert Else, For services to the 1940 Dunkirk Veterans' Association. (Leeds, West Yorkshire)
- Ingrid Lesley Emerson. For services to the Raleigh International Millennium Awards. (Barry, Vale of Glamorgan)
- Peter Humphrey English, Dome and Site Development Manager. For services to the Millennium Dome. (Marlow, Buckinghamshire)
- John Stuart Ennis. For services to the Police. (Belfast)
- Brian Evans. For services to the Welsh Blood Service. (Abercarn, Caerphilly)
- Clifford Stanley Evans, Farmer. For services to the Shropshire Rural Stress Network. (Minsterley, Shropshire)
- Donald Evans. For services to the community in Fenton, Staffordshire. (Stoke-on-Trent, Staffordshire)
- John Harold Evans. For services to the community in Powys. (Llandrinio, Powys)
- Lester Eves. For services to the Urchfont Parish Church and to the community in Urchfont, Wiltshire. (Devizes, Wiltshire)
- Richard John Farn, Director, British Association for Chemical Specialities. For services to the Chemicals Industry. (Carnforth, Lancashire)
- Mrs Nan Farquhar. For services to Housing and to the community in Edinburgh. (Edinburgh)
- James George Ferguson, Support Grade Band 1, Department for Education and Employment. (Wickford, Essex)
- Peter John Ferris, For charitable services to the community. (Coleraine, Londonderry)
- Mrs Ann Fidler, Prison Visitors' Creche Co-Ordinator, HM Prison Camp Hill. For services to the Prison Service. (Freshwater, Isle of Wight)
- Peter Howard Field, Chairman, Windsor and Maidenhead Users' Group. For services to disabled people. (Maidenhead, Berkshire)
- Mrs Helen Mary Fielder. For charitable services to the community through the Sydenham Singers in Beckenham, Kent. (Beckenham, Kent)
- Mrs Anne Figg. For services to the Kent War Pensions Committee. (Sittingbourne, Kent)
- Christopher John Firth, Team Leader Fisheries, Environment Agency, Yorkshire. For services to Fisheries and to the Community. (Doncaster, South Yorkshire)
- Mrs Jenneth Mary Fitzgerald. For services to the Millennium Tapestry, Guernsey. (Guernsey, Channel Islands)
- Peter Alfred Fletcher, JP, Chairman, CLS Care Services. For services to Health and Community Care in Cheshire. (Chester, Cheshire)
- Harry Flett. For services to the Corrigall Farm Museum in Orkney. (Dounby, Orkney)
- Margaret Flockhart. For services to People with Learning Disabilities and to Respite Care in Edinburgh. (Edinburgh)
- Mrs Emily May Foley. For services to George Thomas Hospice Care, Cardiff. (Rhiwbina, Cardiff)
- Mrs Carole Diane Ford, Higher Executive Officer, Child Support Agency, Department of Social Security. (Stirling, Stirling and Falkirk)
- Tony Ford. For services to Association Football. (Nr Crewe, Cheshire)
- Mrs Mary Forde, School Nurse, Shropshire Community Services NHS Trust. For services to Children's Health. (Telford, Shropshire)
- Ronald James Hannah Forsythe. For services to Rural Regeneration and to the community. (Kilkeel, Down)
- Colin George Foster, Higher Executive Officer, Department for Education and Employment. (Gants Hill, Essex)
- Allan Fotheringham. For services to the community in Inverbervie, Kincardineshire. (Inverbervie, Kincardineshire)
- Mrs Brenda Fox, For services to the community, especially Elderly People, in Rode Heath, Staffordshire. (Stoke-on-Trent, Staffordshire)
- Gordon Louis Fox, JP. For services to the Norwood Ravenswood Organisation in London. (London, SW15)
- John Neil Munro Frame. For services to the community and to Sport for Young People. Edinburgh
- Albert Edward French. For services to the community in Dartmouth, Devon. (Dartmouth, Devon)
- Christine French, Local Officer 1, Benefits Agency, Department of Social Security. (Sidcup, Kent)
- Leslie John Fryer. For services to the community in Buckland, Oxfordshire. (Faringdon, Oxfordshire)
- Mrs Cicely Prudence Fuller, Member, Special Education Needs Tribunal. For services to People with Disabilities and to Children with Special Needs. (Oxford, Oxfordshire)
- Clifford Gabb, Porter. For services to the Accident and Emergency Department, Solihull Hospital, Birmingham. (Birmingham, West Midlands)
- Stephen Gannon. For services to Prison Nurses. (Borehamwood, Hertfordshire)
- Lance Kenneth Gardner. For services to Primary Care Nursing. (Wakefield, West Yorkshire)
- Mrs Patricia Mary Gates, DL. For services to the community in Berkshire. (Bracknell, Berkshire)
- Andrew Gemmell. For services to the community in Baldernock and Balmore, Glasgow. (Summerston, Glasgow)
- Raymond Lawrence Georgeson, Executive Director, Waste Watch. For services to Sustainable Waste Management. (Bedford, Bedfordshire)
- Mrs Hilary Jane Gilbertson, JP. For services to the Board of Visitors, HM Prison Full Sutton. (York, North Yorkshire)
- Jeanne Constance Mary Gilbey. For services to the Administration of Justice and to the community in West Yorkshire. (Wakefield, West Yorkshire)
- Geoffrey Munro Gill. For services to Scouting in the Gordon District, Aberdeenshire. (Inverurie, Aberdeenshire)
- John Anthony Gilleghan, Local and Natural History Teacher, Leeds. For services to Education and to the community. (Leeds, West Yorkshire)
- Stanley Terence Gimson. For services to Elderly People in Chingford and Waltham Forest, London. (London, E17)
- Stephen Barry Gittins, Station Officer, West Midlands Fire Service. For services to Link Romania. (Telford, Shropshire)
- David Goben, Firefighter, South Yorkshire Fire and Rescue Service. For services to the Fire Service National Benevolent Fund. (Sheffield, South Yorkshire)
- James Golding, JP, DL, Lately Member, Crewe and Nantwich Borough Council. For services to the community. (Crewe, Cheshire)
- William Alfred Goodridge. For services to the community in Daventry, Northamptonshire. (Daventry, Northamptonshire)
- John Macleod Goodwin. For services to the West of Scotland Water Authority.
- Leslie Albert Goodwin. For charitable services in Leicestershire. (Braunstone, Leicestershire)
- Sylvia Gore. For services to Girls' and Women's Association Football. (Warrington, Cheshire)
- Robert Lionel Gorick. For services to the Plastics Industry and to the community in Preston, Lancashire. (Preston, Lancashire)
- Seaton Constantine Gosling, Chairperson, Black Community Forum. For services to the New Deal and to Community Relations in Sheffield, South Yorkshire. (Sheffield, South Yorkshire)
- Mrs Esther Elizabeth Cole-Graham, JP. For services to the community in Portsmouth, Hampshire. (Portsmouth, Hampshire)
- Mrs Ann Grant, JP. For services to the community, especially the Magistracy, in Aylesbury and Wingrave, Buckinghamshire. (Aylesbury, Buckinghamshire)
- Mrs Gael Heather Grant. For services to Higher Education. (Belfast)
- Alistair Duncan Grassie, General Medical Practitioner, Isle of Arran. For services to Health Care. (Isle of Arran, Ayrshire and Arran)
- Mrs Meryl Gravell, JP. For services to the community in Trimsaran, Carmarthenshire. (Kidwelly, Carmarthenshire)
- Mrs Eleanor Ruby Gray. For services to the Big C Appeal, Norfolk. (Weybourne, Norfolk)
- Kenneth Gray. For services to the community, particularly Age Concern, in St. Merryn, Cornwall. (St Merryn, Cornwall)
- Peter Frank Gray. For services to the community in Windsor, Berkshire. (Windsor, Berkshire)
- Mrs Sybil Agatha Greaves, JP. For services to Community Relations in Peterborough, Cambridgeshire. (Peterborough, Cambridgeshire)
- Desmond Frederick Moorhouse Greef. For services to Music in Norfolk. (Thornham, Norfolk)
- Mrs Deseree Elizabeth Josena Green, Community Nursing Sister, Worcestershire Community Health Care NHS Trust. For services to Nursing. (Worcester, Worcestershire)
- Sidney Herbert Green. For services to Schools' Association Football. (Nr Wigan, Lancashire)
- Mrs Nancy Greenish. For services to Elderly People in Bedfordshire. (Bedford, Bedfordshire)
- Ralph James Michael Grey, Maritime Journalist. For services to Safety at Sea. (West Harrow, Middlesex)
- Sidney Richard Grey, Secretary, Frankley Neighbourhood Forum. For services to the community in Frankley, Birmingham. (Birmingham, West Midlands)
- Mrs Veronica Grimley, Lately B1, Scottish Executive. (Polbeth, West Lothian)
- Mrs Iris Ethel Gundry, JP. For services to the WRVS in Derbyshire, Hampshire and Wiltshire. (Southampton, Hampshire)
- Margaret Ann Gunn, JP. For services to the community in Winchester, Hampshire. (Winchester, Hampshire)
- Peter Barrington Gunn. For services to Disabled Sport. (Ystradgynlais, Swansea)
- Henry Guterman. For services to Community Relations in Manchester. (Didsbury, Greater Manchester)
- Mrs Mollie Hacking, Customer Services Manager, H.M. Board of Inland Revenue. (Kenton, Middlesex)
- Joseph Haigh, Newsvendor, Yorkshire Evening Post. For services to the Newspaper Industry. (Boroughbridge, North Yorkshire)
- Mrs Joan Margaret Haigh, Lately Physiotherapy Assistant, Grantham and District Hospital, Lincolnshire. For services to Physiotherapy. (Grantham, Lincolnshire)
- Mrs Yvonne Mary Keturah Hain. For services to the community in Cobham, Surrey. (Cobham, Surrey)
- Norman Mitchelmore Haines. For services to LINK in Wiltshire. (Corsham, Wiltshire)
- Mrs Harriet Haire. For services to the Trafalgar Housing Co-operative, Dalmuir, Clydebank. (Clydebank, Dunbartonshire)
- Bruce Newman George Hall, Chairman, Cotswold Canals Trust. For services to Canal Restoration. (Nailsworth, Gloucestershire)
- Muhammad Abdul Hamid. For services to Community Relations. (London, SW18)
- Thomas Gardner Hamill, Technical Manager, Marconi Aerospace Systems, Marconi Avionics Ltd. For services to the Defence Industry. (Rainham, Kent)
- Edward Gerard Hamilton. For services to the Police. (Belfast)
- Mrs Natalie Elaine Pinnock-Hamilton. For services to Community Relations in Huddersfield. (Huddersfield, West Yorkshire)
- Mrs Norah Stanley Brady Hamilton. For services to the Robert Jones and Agnes Hunt Orthopaedic Hospital League of Friends, Oswestry, Shropshire. (Oswestry, Shropshire)
- Edward J. Hampton, Clerk of Works, Globe Trust. For services to the Construction Industry. (London, NW1)
- Mrs Bettina Claire Lascelles Harden. For services to the Millennium Celebrations in Wales. (Pwllheli, Gwynedd)
- Mrs Phyllis Margaret Hardman. For services to the community in Lancashire. (Knott End-on-Sea, Lancashire)
- Claude Charles Harlington, Lately Town Clerk, Bollington Town Council, Macclesfield. For services to Local Government. (Macclesfield, Cheshire)
- Edna Harmer. For services to Voluntary Services Overseas. (London, N16)
- Jacqui Harper. For services to the Ethnic community and to Mentoring. (London, W11)
- James William Edward Harrington, Higher Linguist Officer, Ministry of Defence. (Isleworth, Middlesex)
- Dorothy Katherine Harris. For services to the community, especially the Guides and Scouts, in Taunton, Somerset. (Taunton, Somerset)
- Ronald Richard Hart, Train Services Manager, London Underground. For services to London Transport. (High Wycombe, Buckinghamshire)
- Mrs Margaret Joan Harvey. For services to the community in Camborne, Cornwall. (Camborne, Cornwall)
- Anne Louise Hastie, General Medical Practitioner, Surrey. For services to Health Care. (Cheam, Surrey)
- Anne Hayden, General Medical Practitioner. For services to the improvement of Mental Health in Children. (Wimborne, Dorset)
- James Albert Haworth. For services to Music in Rossendale, Lancashire. (Rossendale, Lancashire)
- George Frank Haynes, Area Officer, Warwickshire Special Constabulary. For services to the Police. (Near Atherstone, Warwickshire)
- Mrs Kathleen Hayward, For services to the community in Blackpool, Lancashire. (Blackpool, Lancashire)
- Mrs Nicola Hayward. Proprietor, Seaview Hotel and Restaurant, Isle of Wight. For services to Tourism. (Seaview, Isle of Wight)
- Leslie Heaviside. For services to Fire Protection Systems. (Wilmslow, Cheshire)
- Kevan James Helsby, Leader, Horwich Town Council. For services to the community in Horwich, Lancashire. (Bolton, Greater Manchester)
- Mrs Cecily Henderson, Clinical Services Manager, Care of the Elderly, Lothian Primary Care NHS Trust. For services to Elderly People. (Edinburgh)
- Mrs Arlene Kay Henry, Personal Secretary, Home Office. (London, SE6)
- Mrs Joan Mary Hewitt. For services to the Norfolk Hospital Library Service and to the St. John Ambulance Brigade. (Southwold, Suffolk)
- Derek Hewlett. For services to the National Dahlia Society. (Hayes, Middlesex)
- Gordon Candsdell Hicks. For services to the London Occupational Health, Safety and Hygiene Group. (Ascot, Berkshire)
- Mrs Sheelagh Elizabeth Hillan, DL, Community Pharmacist. For services to the Pharmaceutical Profession. (London)
- Francis Phelps Hillier. For services to the community in Somerset. (Bath, Somerset)
- Sheila Jean Hind, Newsroom Organiser, BBC. For services to Broadcasting. (London, W1M)
- Arthur Douglas Hirst, Member, North Cornwall District Council. For services to the community. (Padstow, Cornwall)
- John Adrian Hobson, N.V.Q. External Verifier. For services to Librarianship and Information Provision. (Betchworth, Surrey)
- Roy William Hodgson. For services to Tourism and to the community in Sandwich, Kent. (Sandwich, Kent)
- Neville John (Noddy) Holder, Singer. For services to music. (London, NW1)
- Brian Ross Hollands. For services to the community in Croydon, Surrey. (South Croydon, Surrey)
- Frank Langley Holmes. For services to the Development of Astronomical Instruments. (Edinburgh)
- Mrs Jennifer Eileen Honeyball, Assistant Head, School of Science, Health and Care, Middlesbrough College. For services to Further Education. (Middlesbrough, North Yorkshire)
- Samuel Richard Hooper Honeywill. For services to the community in Exeter, Devon. (Exeter, Devon)
- Mrs Barbara Hoo., For services to Riding for the Disabled in Eastern England. (Saffron Walden, Essex)
- Malcolm Hood, Chairman and Organiser, Wroxall Minibus, Isle of Wight. For services to disabled people. (Ventnor, Isle of Wight)
- Mrs Freda Irene Peace Hookings. For services to the Tunley Athletic Football Club, Somerset. (Bath, Somerset)
- Terry Hopgood. For services to the maintenance of Bexleyheath Cemetery, Kent. (London, SE18)
- Mrs Betty Nellie Hopkins. For services to the community in Twickenham, Middlesex. (Twickenham, Middlesex)
- Mrs Susan Ann Horne. For services to the Space Science Programme and to Education. (Wantage, Oxfordshire)
- Thomas Alfred Horton. For services to Golf. (St Martin, Jersey)
- George Thomas Housego. For services to the Far Eastern Prisoners' of War Association. (London, SE15)
- Herbert Housley, Honorary Treasurer, Bethany House Trust and Worthwhile Occupational and Recreational Krafts Ltd. For services to the community in Sheffield. (Sheffield, South Yorkshire)
- Mrs Janet Elizabeth Houston, Planning Manager AIR2000 Ltd. For services to the Air Industry. (Cranbrook, Kent)
- Mrs Phyllis Howarth. For services to the community, particularly Elderly People, in Poynton, Cheshire. (Poynton, Cheshire)
- John Gary Howell, Chief Engineer, Shrewsbury and Atcham Borough Council. For services to the community in Shropshire. (Oswestry, Shropshire)
- Wendy Hubbard, Higher Executive Officer, Fire Service College, Home Office. (Banbury, Oxfordshire)
- Josephine Hudson, JP. For services to Young People and to the community in Huddersfield, West Yorkshire. (Huddersfield, West Yorkshire)
- Eric Hudson. For services to Community Relations in Leicester. (Leicester, Leicestershire)
- Mrs Dorothy Mary Huggard. For services to Young People, especially Guiding, in Hampshire. (Liphook, Hampshire)
- Brian Hughes. For services to the Collyhurst and Moston Lads' Club, Manchester. (Chadderton, Lancashire)
- George Walford Hughes. For services to the Burma Star Association. (Borth, Ceredigion)
- Mrs Gillian Hughes, Lately Senior Private Secretary, The Crown Estate. (Felixstowe, Suffolk)
- Oswald Edmund Branford Hughes. For services to the community in East Sussex. (Tunbridge Wells, Kent)
- Roger Hunt, Member, England Team, World Cup 1966. For services to Association Football. (Nr Warrington, Cheshire)
- John Andrew Denny Hunter, Director and Vice President, Marine Service, Standard Marine Services Ltd. For services to the Shipping Industry. (Lymington, Hampshire)
- Sabir Hussain. For services to the community in Birmingham. (Birmingham, West Midlands)
- Charles Anthony Hutchinson, County Adviser for 14–19 Education, Suffolk. For services to Education. (Ipswich, Suffolk)
- Mrs Maureen Wilson Irwin, For services to the RAF Association. (Newtownabbey, Antrim)
- Clive Harold Izard, Lately Member, Mid Sussex District Council and Ardingly Parish Council. For services to the community. (Haywards Heath, Sussex)
- Arthur Stanley Roy Jackson, Member, North Wiltshire District Council. For services to Local Government and to the community. (Corsham, Wiltshire)
- Nicholas Lawrence Jackson, Zoological Director, Zoological Society of Wales. For services to the Advancement of Zoological Collections. (Colwyn Bay, Conwy)
- Christopher Roy Jagger. For services to the community in Godalming, Surrey. (Godalming, Surrey)
- Derek George Jarman. For charitable services in the community in Ipswich, Suffolk. (Ipswich, Suffolk)
- Vivian Wyndham Jarman. For services to the RAF Association in Wales. (Dinas Powys, South Glamorgan)
- Mrs Felicity Vera Frances Effa Jay. For services to the community in East Bridgford, Nottinghamshire. (Nottingham, Nottinghamshire)
- Mrs Christina Anne Jefferis. For services to the Mount Edgcumbe Hospice in St. Austell and to the community in Downderry, Cornwall. (Torpoint, Cornwall)
- Raymond Oliver Jeffs. For services to the community in Southport, Lancashire. (Southport, Lancashire)
- Colston Henry Jenkins, Lately Post Master. For services to the community in Osmington, Dorset. (Weymouth, Dorset)
- Edward Henry Jenkins, Area Youth Leader, Herdings Youth Centre, Sheffield, South Yorkshire. For services to Young People. (Sheffield, South Yorkshire)
- Neil Roger Jenkins. For services to Rugby Union Football in Wales. (Pontypridd, Rhondda Cynon Taff)
- Peter Jenkins, Community Pharmacist. For services to Pharmacy and to the community in Abercynon, South Wales. (Whitchurch, Cardiff)
- Mrs Marie Patricia Jennings, Chairman, Money Management Council. For services to Personal Finance. (Stroud, Gloucestershire)
- Mrs Christine Dorothy Jensen. For services to Trawler Safety and to the community in Hull, East Yorkshire. (Hull, East Yorkshire)
- Mrs Joan Esmonde Johnson. For services to the Guide Association and to the community on the Isle of Wight. (Cowes, Isle of Wight)
- Thomas Charles Johnson, Director, Stevenage Community Trust. For services to the Millennium Celebrations in Stevenage, Hertfordshire. (Stevenage, Hertfordshire)
- Mrs Karen Johnstone, For services to the community, especially the Woolstore Theatre, in Codford, Wiltshire. (Warminster, Wiltshire)
- Allan William Jones. Energy Services Manager, Woking Borough Council. For services to Energy and Water Efficiency. (Guildford, Surrey)
- Mrs Beatrice Evelyn Jones. For services to the WRVS and to Elderly People in Flintshire. (Flint, Flintshire)
- Mrs Ceri Jones, For services to the community in Port Talbot, West Glamorgan. (Cwmavon, Neath Port Talbot)
- Dai Llanilar Jones. For services to Entertainment in Wales. (Llanilar, Ceredigion)
- Derek Hambury Jones. For services to the community, especially the Royal British Legion, in Monmouth. (Monmouth, Monmouthshire)
- Melvyn William Jones, Lately Pay Band 8, Employment Service, Department for Education and Employment. (Telford, Shropshire)
- Patrick Garner Gwynn-Jones. For services to the Restaurant Association. (Hersham, Surrey)
- Mrs Anne Merrilees Kahane. For services to Archaeology. (Lochgilphead, Argyll and Bute)
- Thomas Kane, Court Office Steward. For services to the University of Glasgow. (Partick, Glasgow)
- Mrs Amrit Kaur. For services to Community Relations in Blackburn, Lancashire. (Blackburn, Lancashire)
- Eileen Kelly. For services to Education for Adults. (Belfast)
- Mark Kelly. For services to Employment Opportunities. (Templepatrick, Antrim)
- Moya Helen Kelly, General Medical Practitioner, Glasgow. For services to Health Care. (Glasgow)
- David Ferguson Kennedy. For services to the Boys' Brigade. (Holywood, Down)
- Mary Margaret Kennedy, Lately Principal Teacher of Chemistry, Holyrood Secondary School. For services to Education in Glasgow. (Glasgow)
- Amos John Kennerley. For services to the Fingerprint Unit, Lancashire Constabulary. (Preston, Lancashire)
- Burton Roy Kenwright, DFC. For services to the community, especially the YMCA, in Warwickshire. (Leamington Spa, Warwickshire)
- Mrs Elizabeth Kerr, For public service. (Belfast)
- Margaret Windrim Kerr. For public service. (Belfast)
- Eric Christopher Kewley. For public service. (Belfast)
- Alastair David Campbell Kidd. For services to Disabled Sport. (Inverness)
- Mrs Susan Kidd, Finance Manager, Site and Structures. For services to the Millennium Dome. (London, SE18)
- Allan Wilfred Killip. For services to Motorcycle Sport on the Isle of Man. (Crosby, Isle of Man)
- Mrs Jean Rigby Kilpatrick. For charitable services to the community in Morecambe, Lancashire. (Morecambe, Lancashire)
- Mrs Margaret Mary King, Co-ordinator, Duke of Edinburgh's Award Scheme, Merseyside. For services to Young People. (St Helens, Lancashire)
- Mrs Ivy Kinsella, Administrative Officer, Benefits Agency, Department of Social Security. (Blackpool, Lancashire)
- Edward Lawrence Kissack, Secretary, Manx Regiment, Old Comrades' Association. For services to Ex-Servicemen on the Isle of Man. (Douglas, Isle of Man)
- Mrs Florence Selina Knapman. For services to the WRVS in Plymouth, Devon. (Plymouth, Devon)
- Mrs Adele Kolliari, Cloakroom Attendant. For services to Scotts Restaurant, London. (London, N8)
- Mrs Muriel McKinlay Laing, Headteacher, Bishoploch Primary School. For services to Education. (Milngavie, Dunbartonshire)
- Bernard Langer. For charitable services in Manchester. (Manchester, Greater Manchester)
- Mrs Shiela Langford. For services to the community in Portsmouth, Hampshire. (Portsmouth, Hampshire)
- Mrs Jennifer Larche. For services to Community Relations in High Wycombe, Buckinghamshire. (High Wycombe, Buckinghamshire)
- Mrs Linda Larter. For services to the Great Baddow Millennium Community Centre Project, Essex. (Southminster, Essex)
- Mrs Rosemary Jeanne Lates. For services to Elderly People in Solihull, West Midlands. (Solihull, West Midlands)
- Philip Bryan Latham. For services to the community, especially Thwaite Mills and Schools' Sport, in Batley, West Yorkshire. (Batley, West Yorkshire)
- Mrs Rosemary Kathleen Laurie. For services to the Citizens Advice Bureau in Shrewsbury, Shropshire. (Ludlow, Shropshire)
- Ivan Lawler. For services to Canoeing. (Ottershaw, Surrey)
- James Alexander Lawrie, General Medical Practitioner, London. For services to Health Care. (London, E14)
- Susan Marion Lazenby. For services to Neo-Natal Units in Great Britain and to charities in Lancashire. (Preston, Lancashire)
- Thomas Lea, Organist and Choirmaster, St. Werburgh's Church. For services to the community in Warburton, Cheshire. (Nr Lymm, Cheshire)
- Richard Maurice Leary, Detective Inspector, West Midlands Police. For services to the Police. (Harlaston, Staffordshire)
- Capt John Norman Bairnson Leask, Deputy Chief Pilot and Line Training Captain, Bristow/HMCG Search and Rescue Helicopter Unit, Shetland. For services to Marine Safety. (Lerwick, Shetland)
- Norman Samuel Lee. For services to the St. John Ambulance Brigade in Nottinghamshire. (Nottingham, Nottinghamshire)
- Roger Lees. For services to Action Aid. (Ingatestone, Essex)
- Barbara Jean Leighton, Lately Typist. For services to the Corporation of London. (Enfield, Middlesex)
- George Patrick Leonard. For services to Flood Defence, the Environment and to London. (Sevenoaks, Kent)
- Thomas Lever. For services to the community, especially Young People, in Lower Kersal, Manchester. (Salford 7, Greater Manchester)
- Arthur Frederick Lewis. For services to the Pensilva Century Square Project, Cornwall. (Liskeard, Cornwall)
- Mrs Enid May Lewis. For services to the community in Llantrisant, South Wales. (Rhondda Cynon Taff)
- Mrs Mina Elizabeth Lewis. For services to the voluntary sector. (Farnborough, Hampshire)
- Robert James Liddle, Trainer, Computer Programming. For services to the provision of Internet Access for the Community in Derwentside. (South Stanley, Durham)
- Robert James Lilley. For services to the St. John Ambulance Brigade. (Ballymena, Antrim)
- Mrs Shu Pao Lim. For services to the Camden Chinese Community Centre. (London, N11)
- Alexander John Lindsay, Supervisory Technician, Mackie Academy. For services to Education. (Inverurie, Aberdeenshire)
- Gerald Julian Lipton, For services to Nightingale House and to the Jewish community in London. (London, NW8)
- Mrs Peggy Dorinda Littlefield. For services to the WRVS at Doddington Hospital, Cambridgeshire. (March, Cambridgeshire)
- Mrs Margaret Eileen Lloyd. For services to Drama and to Blind People in Nelson, Lancashire. (Nelson, Lancashire)
- Mrs Agnes Logan. For services to Barnardo's. (Newtownabbey, Antrim)
- Leroy Hugh Logan, Inspector, Metropolitan Police. For services to the Police Service and to community relations. (Woodford Green, Essex)
- Mrs Mary Loney, Access Tutor in Art and Design, Calderdale College Corporation. For services to Education. (Hebden Bridge, West Yorkshire)
- Thomas Washington Longstaff. For services to Rotary International. (Willenhall, West Midlands)
- Margaret Waugh Lothian. For services to the Galloway Cattle Society. (Castle Douglas, Kirkcudbrightshire)
- Reginald James Low, Senior Investigation Officer, H.M. Board of Customs and Excise. (Bolivia)
- Mrs Margaret Luckett, Lately School Crossing Patrol, Prittlewell, Essex. For services to Road Safety. (Southend on Sea, Essex)
- Derek Anthony Ludlow. For services to Business and to the community in Luton, Bedfordshire. (Luton, Bedfordshire)
- Mrs Cissie Luper. For services to the Leukaemia Research Fund in Brighton and Hove, East Sussex. (Hove, Sussex)
- Mrs Ann Lush. For services to the Children's Society in Penarth, Vale of Glamorgan. (Penarth, Vale of Glamorgan)
- Dennis John Lush. For services to the Children's Society in Penarth, Vale of Glamorgan. (Penarth, Vale of Glamorgan)
- The Rev Stephen Brian Lynas. For services to the millennium celebrations. (South Brent, Devon)
- Geraldine Lynch. For services to the Registration of Births, Deaths and Marriages. (Dumfries)
- Edith MacArthur, Actress. For services to Drama. (Edinburgh)
- Mrs Jean MacBeath, Chairman, Cromarty Courthouse Trust. For services to the community in Cromarty. (Cromarty, Ross and Cromarty)
- John Norman MacDonald, Retained Station Officer, Highland and Islands Fire Brigade. For services to the Fire Service and to the community. (Stornoway, Isle of Lewis)
- Jonathan MacDonald. For services to Crofting and to the community in Kilmuir, Skye. (Skye, Ross and Cromarty)
- Alice Aitken MacKenzie. For services to Save the Children in Kirkintilloch. (Lenzie, Dunbartonshire)
- Lawrence Ross MacKintosh, Lately Head of Secretariat, Arts Council of England. For services to the Arts. (London, NW3)
- Terence Maddix, Lately Site Agent, Grange School, Kempston, Bedford. For services to Education. (Bedford, Bedfordshire)
- Samuel James Magee, JP. For services to Local Government. (Antrim)
- Dr Beryl Helene Doris Magrath, Medical Director and Consultant Anaesthetist. For services to South Bromley Hospicecare. (Chislehurst, Kent)
- Talat Mahmud, Business Development Manager, Manchester Airport plc. For services to the Ethnic community. (Stretford, Greater Manchester)
- Mrs Phyllis Manning. For services to the RSPCA. (Penzance, Cornwall)
- David Henry Manson, Partner, Doig and Smith. For services to Surveying in the Construction Industry in Scotland. (Milngavie, Dunbartonshire)
- Gary Jonathan Mantle, Director, Wiltshire Wildlife Trust. For services to Wildlife Conservation. (Pewsey, Wiltshire)
- Mrs Heather March, DL, Member, OFWAT's Customer Service Committee for Wales. For services to Water Customers. (Llantwit Major, Vale of Glamorgan)
- The Rev Canon Gervase William Markham. For services to the Morland Choristers' Camp in Cumbria. (Penrith, Cumbria)
- David J. Marks, Architect. For services to the British Airways London Eye. (London, SW4)
- Mrs Gwendoline Marsden, Parish Clerk. For services to the community in Richards Castle, Shropshire. (Brimfield, Shropshire)
- John James Marshall, QPM. For services to the community in Hove, East Sussex. (Hove, East Sussex)
- Mrs Elizabeth Martin, For services to the community in Ayr. (Ayr, Ayrshire and Arran)
- James Paterson Martin, Chauffeur to the First Minister, Scottish Executive. (Edinburgh)
- Mrs June Martin. For services to the community in Windsor and Maidenhead, Berkshire. (Ascot, Berkshire)
- Paul Darnley Martin, Coxswain Mechanic, Skegness Lifeboat, Lincolnshire. For services to Maritime Safety. (Skegness, Lincolnshire)
- Michael George Massey. For services to the Wheelchair Dance Association. (Wembley, Middlesex)
- Douglas Scott Matheson. For services to Art and Design Education. (Crieff, Perth and Kinross)
- Patricia Mary Maude, Head of Physical Education, Homerton College, Cambridge. For services to Physical Education. (Cambridge, Cambridgeshire)
- Valerie Mary Maughan, Local Officer 1, Department of Social Security. (Cleveland, North Yorkshire)
- Mrs Irene Maw. For services to the Southwick Youth and Community Centre, Tyne and Wear. (Sunderland, Tyne and Wear)
- Anne Mayes, Member, OFWAT's Customer Service Committee for the South West. For services to Water Customers. (Exeter, Devon)
- Russell Guy Maynard, Executive Officer, Ministry of Defence. (London)
- Doreen Edwina Mayston. For services to the community in Ditchling, East Sussex.
- Robert Francis McBlane, JP. For services to Rolls-Royce and the community in Derbyshire. (Chellaston, Derbyshire)
- Michael Desmond McCaldi. For services to Water Recreation and Tourism. (Kesh, Fermanagh)
- Thomas James McCann. For services to Vulnerable and Disadvantaged Homeless People. (Belfast)
- Mrs Myrtle Doreen McCarroll. For services to the community. (Ballymena, Antrim)
- Mrs Sadie McClelland. For services to the Women's National Commission. (Groomsport, Down)
- Joseph Robert McClure. For services to the Royal British Legion in Tyne and Wear. (Gateshead, Tyne and Wear)
- Sister Philomena McCluskey. For services to the Catholic Children's Rescue Society. (Didsbury, Greater Manchester)
- Stewart Verrier McCormick. For services to Music in Berwick upon Tweed, Northumberland. (Wooler, Northumberland)
- Pamela Anne McCoy, Honours Secretary, Department of Health. (Thornton Heath, Surrey)
- Mrs Joy McCulloch, Cardiac Rehabilitation Nurse, Memorial Hospital, Darlington. For services to Health Care. (Ingleton, Durham)
- Thomas Page McDevitte, Journalist. For services to the community. (Belfast)
- William McDonald. For services to the Scout Association.
- James Aubrey McElhinney. For services to the Police. (London)
- Mrs Jane McGill, Sergeant, West Yorkshire Police. For services to Community Relations. (Wakefield, West Yorkshire)
- Mrs Anna McGlone. For services to St. Monica's Girls' Club, Coatbridge, Lanarkshire. (Coatbridge, Lanarkshire)
- Donald Frank McGuire. For services to the community in Jesmond, Newcastle upon Tyne. (Newcastle upon Tyne, Tyne and Wear)
- Douglas Scott McKay, Special Constable, Lothian and Borders Police Force. For services to the community. (Balerno, Midlothian)
- Kenneth Gordon McKenzie, Principal Teacher of Guidance, Northfield Academy. For services to education and schools sport in Aberdeen. (Aberdeen)
- Violet Easton McKinlay, Secretary to the Chief Constable, Strathclyde Police Force. For services to the Police. (Townhead, Glasgow)
- George Brown McLaughlin, Lately Audio Visual Technician, University of Aberdeen. For services to Students and Education. (Aberdeen)
- William Neish McMartin, Sub-Officer, Central Scotland Fire Brigade. For services to the Fire Service and to the International Rescue Corps. (Falkirk, Stirling and Falkirk)
- Mrs Peggy Joan McMunn. For services to the Nuffield Orthopaedic Centre in Oxford. (Aylesbury, Buckinghamshire)
- Capt Niall A. McNab, Honorary Secretary, Montrose Lifeboat Station, Angus. For services to the RNLI. (Montrose, Angus)
- Philip Sean McShane. For services to the Community.
- Mrs Elizabeth McVay. For services to the community of Pilton, Edinburgh.
- Canon David Mead, Lately Bursar, Coventry Cathedral. For service to the Church of England. (Evesham, Worcestershire)
- Andrew Crawford Meiklejohn. For services to the Boys' Brigade in Falkirk. (Falkirk, Stirling and Falkirk)
- Mrs Pamela Sylvia May Melvin. For services to the Port of London Authority Police Pensioners' Association. (Orford, Suffolk)
- Paul David Mendel, Director, Council of Christians and Jews. For services to Ecumenicalism. (London, NW6)
- Estyn Thomas Dodd Meredith. For services to the community, particularly Young People, in Powys. (Builth Wells, Powys)
- Hugh Bernard Meynell. For services to the community in Shropshire. (Salop, Shropshire)
- Mrs Shamshad Akhter Mian. For services to the Pakistani Women's Welfare Association. (London, N4)
- Mrs Phebe Jane Elizabeth Midgley. For services to the community in Allerton, Somerset. (Axbridge, Somerset)
- Mrs Olive Midha, JP. For services to Save the Children. (Gowerton, Swansea)
- Sebastian Mille. For services to the Bristol Zoo Gardens. (Near Badminton, Gloucestershire)
- Mrs Janet Mills, Higher Executive Officer, Benefits Agency, Department of Social Security. (Nottingham, Nottinghamshire)
- Trevor Milner. For services to Chilterns Gateway Club, Amersham, Buckinghamshire. (Amersham, Buckinghamshire)
- Helen Maureen Miskimmin. For services to Victims of Crime. (Carrickfergus, Antrim)
- Peter John Mitchell, Leader, Viking Venture Scout Unit, Derbyshire. For services to Young People. (Derby, Derbyshire)
- Mrs Gopa Mitra, Head of Public Affairs, Proprietary Association of Great Britain. For services to the Pharmaceutical Industry. (London, NW6)
- Janet Louise Moates, BEM. For services to the Soldiers', Sailors' and Airmen's Families Association in Devon. (Exeter, Devon)
- Mrs Ruth Modeste, Assistant Cashier, Gardner Merchant. For services to Catering in the Home Office. (London, SE17)
- Anthony Ernest Mogford, For services to Education and to the community in Buckinghamshire. (Wendover, Buckinghamshire)
- Rita Pamela Molland, Teacher of Computer Studies for Visually Disabled People, Salisbury College. For services to Special Educational Needs. (Salisbury, Wiltshire)
- Arnold Moore. For services to the War on Cancer Trust in Bradford, West Yorkshire. (Leeds, West Yorkshire)
- Ian Roderick Norton Moore. For services to the Cumberland Toy and Model Museum, Cumbria. (Cockermouth, Cumbria)
- Milton James Moore, Chairman, Peterborough Association for the Blind. For services to Visually Impaired People. (Nr Peterborough, Cambridgeshire)
- Robert John Moore. For services to Scientific Librarianship. (St Albans, Hertfordshire)
- Sidney Charles Moore. For services to the community in Frimley Green, Surrey. (Frimley Green, Surrey)
- Olive Rose Moran, Lately B1, Department for International Development. (London, N22)
- Peter Moran. For services to the Regeneration of Rotherham, Yorkshire. (Rotherham, South Yorkshire)
- Robert William Morrell, Co-founder, Thomas Paine Society. For services to Historical Research. (Nottingham, Nottinghamshire)
- Mrs Hilda Joyce Morris, Honorary Treasurer, Whitehaven Branch and St. Bees Lifeboat Station Branch. For services to the RNLI in Cumbria. (Cleator Moor, Cumbria)
- James Victor Thomas Morris. For charitable services. (London, SW3)
- Andrew Morrison. For services to Education. (Belfast)
- Mrs Caroline Elizabeth Morrison, Occupational Health Nurse Adviser, Marconi Electronic Systems Ltd. For services to the Defence Industry. (Chichester, West Sussex)
- Abdul Chunu Mukit, Youth and Community Worker, Tower Hamlets, East London. For services to Young People. (London, E2)
- Mrs Claire Mullineaux, VAT Assurance Manager, H.M. Board of Customs and Excise. (Southampton, Hampshire)
- The Rev John Mullineaux. For services to Homeless People in Lancaster, Lancashire. (Lancaster, Lancashire)
- David John Mummery, BEM. For services to the Service Institute Fund at RAF Halton, Buckinghamshire. (Aylesbury, Buckinghamshire)
- Georgina Murphy. For services to disabled children in Glasgow. (Glasgow)
- Herbert Murray, Musician and Composer. For services to Traditional Scottish Music. (Lang Stracht, Aberdeen)
- Deepak Ghelabhai Naik. For services to the Churches and Other Faiths Millennium Group and to Community Relations. (Coventry, West Midlands)
- Henry Charles Neil. For services to Choral Music in Perthshire. (Murthly, Perth and Kinross)
- Mrs Frances Nelson, Chair, Dundee Federation Tenants Association. For services to Housing Tenants in Dundee. (Dundee)
- Mrs Ruth Phyllis Nelson. For services to Counselling People with Eating Disorders on Jersey. (St Saviour, Jersey)
- John Neumark. For services to the Elham Village Hall Project, Kent. (Canterbury, Kent)
- Mrs Elizabeth Nicholl. For services to Netball. (Hitchin, Hertfordshire)
- Bridget Mary Nicholson, Senior Personal Secretary, H.M. Board of Inland Revenue. (Beckenham, Kent)
- Mrs Judith Nicol, Director, Tweed Foundation and Clerk, River Tweed Commissioners. For services to Fishery Management. (Roxburgh, Borders)
- Mrs Anna Maria Nie, Support Manager 3, Department of the Environment, Transport and the Regions. (Belvedere, Kent)
- Robert Nightingale. For services to Justice. (Epsom, Surrey)
- Mrs Sheila Mary Nix, Secretary, Pocklington Canal Amenity Society and Vice Chairman, Inland Waterways Association North East Region Committee. For services to Inland Waterways. (York, North Yorkshire)
- Samuel Nixon. For public service. (Crossgar, Down)
- Maureen Ann Nobes, Personal Secretary, Ministry of Defence. (Gosport, Hampshire)
- Mrs Olive Elizabeth Norris. For services to the community in Thompson, Norfolk. (Thetford, Norfolk)
- Mrs Mary Elizabeth Noyes. For services to Music in Kew, Surrey. (Richmond, Surrey)
- Mrs Fionnula Mary Jay-O'Boyle. For services to Conservation. (Belfast)
- Mrs Mary O'Donnell, Manager, Appledore. For services to Children with Difficulties in Birmingham. (Birmingham, West Midlands)
- Reginald O'Neil. For services to the RAF Association in Essex. (Walton-on-the-Naze, Essex)
- Francis O'Neill, Telecommunications Manager, Argyll and Clyde Acute Hospitals NHS Trust. For services to Telecommunications in the NHS. (Greenock, Renfrewshire)
- Terence David O'Rourke. For services to Town Planning. (Poole, Dorset)
- Jean Oliver. For services to the Royal Star and Garter Home, Richmond, Surrey. (Richmond, Surrey)
- Mrs Juliet Orridge. For services to the Earlswood Secure Unit, Birmingham. (Kenilworth, West Midlands)
- Brian Edmund Victor Orriss, Lately Handyman, Royal Naval College, Ministry of Defence. (Bexleyheath, Kent)
- Mrs Nancy Lilias Genevieve Ovens. For services to Vocational Education and Training in Sport, Recreation and Playwork. (Edinburgh)
- Sybil Gwynne Ovenstone. For services to University College, Oxford. (Oxford, Oxfordshire)
- Derrick Ovington, National President, Federation of Master Builders. For services to the Construction Industry. (Whitley Bay, Tyne and Wear)
- Mrs Linda Ovnik, Chief Executive, Island Volunteers. For services to Volunteering and Regeneration on the Isle of Wight. (Carisbrooke, Isle of Wight)
- Christopher Owen, Higher Executive Officer, Ministry of Defence. (Kilburn, London)
- Andrew William Owens, Chairman and Managing Director, Greenergy International Ltd. For services to the Environment and the promotion of City Diesel. (Bath, Somerset)
- James Andrew Owens, Firefighter, Strathclyde Fire Brigade. For charitable services in Port Glasgow. (Greenock, Renfrewshire)
- Robert Dennis Owens. For services to the Mid-Sefton Victim Support Scheme. (Liverpool, Merseyside)
- Anne Claire Oxenham, Departmental Map Librarian and Curator, Department of Geography, University College London. For services to Archivism. (London, SE26)
- Mrs Margaret Pacey, Home Care Assistant. For services to Elderly People in Bottesford, Leicestershire. (Bottesford, Leicestershire)
- John Leslie Packham, Advanced Driving Examiner, Institute of Advanced Motorists. For services to Road Safety. (Wakefield, West Yorkshire)
- Mrs Pamela Page. For services to Fostering in London. (London, NW5)
- Wallace Barrie Page. For services to Scottish Agricultural Wages Board. (Uckfield, East Sussex)
- The Rev Michael Christopher Palmer. For services to the Friends of the Freshfield Association in Truro, Cornwall. (Cuddesdon, Oxfordshire)
- Mrs Elizabeth Mary Lamberton Park. For services to Grampian Health Board. (Aberdeen)
- Mrs Constance Leslie Parker, JP. For services to the Independent Meals on Wheels Scheme in North Somercotes, Lincolnshire. (Louth, Lincolnshire)
- John Ritchie Sproat Parker. For services to the community in Borgue, Kirkcudbright.
- Noel Francis Parker. For service to Scouting in Leighton Buzzard, Bedfordshire. (Leighton Buzzard, Bedfordshire)
- Andrew Francis Parry, Greenwich Liaison and Visitor Centre Manager. For services to the Millennium Dome. (London, SE12)
- Raymond Frederick Parsons, Farm manager, Easton College, Norwich. For services to Agriculture and to Agricultural Education in Norfolk. (Norwich, Norfolk)
- William Frederick Parton, JP. For services to the community especially Scouting, in Telford, Shropshire. (Telford, Shropshire)
- Mrs Ruth Carmel Patterson. For services to Health Care and to the community. (Bangor, Down)
- Dennis Albert Pattinson. For services to the community, particularly the Frome Cheese Show, in Frome, Somerset. (Frome, Somerset)
- Mrs Barbara Jean Paxman, Secretary, Hertford College, Oxford. For services to Higher Education. (Morcombelake, Dorset)
- Mrs Susan Vickie Payne. For services to Dyslexic Children and Adults in Plymouth, Devon. (Plymouth, Devon)
- Arthur Peacher. For services to the community in Broadbottom, Cheshire. (Hyde, Cheshire)
- Sandra Peake, Director, WAVE. For services to People Bereaved and Traumatised. (Belfast)
- Colin Ivor Harry Pearce, Assistant District Officer 1, Maritime and Coastguard Agency, Department of the Environment, Transport and the Regions. (Weymouth, Dorset)
- Michael John Pearce. For services to the community, especially Scouting, in London. (London, SW1V)
- Mrs Pamela Pearce. For services to the National Osteoporosis Society in West Sussex. (Burgess Hill, West Sussex)
- Peter Russell Pearce, Special Needs Adviser. For services to South Western Electricity Board. (Newton Abbot, Devon)
- John Roland Pearl, Member, Holbeach Parish Council. For services to Local Government and the community in South Lincolnshire. (Spalding, Lincolnshire)
- Professor John Peberdy, Deputy Head, School of Biological Sciences, University of Nottingham. For services to Entrepreneurial Training for Scientists. (Nottingham, Nottinghamshire)
- Mrs Pamela Pengilly. For services to Elderly People in Wonersh, Surrey. (Guildford, Surrey)
- Francis William Perowne, Chairman of Governors. For services to Fakenham High School, Norfolk. (Fakenham, Norfolk)
- Mrs Anne Christine Petty, Sister, Plaster Room, Royal Infirmary, Bradford. For services to Health Care. (Halifax, West Yorkshire)
- Hazel Phillippo. For services to the Youth Centre, Sutton Bridge, Lincolnshire. (Spalding, Lincolnshire)
- Mrs Cynthia Bernadette Phillips, Sub Officer, Northamptonshire Fire and Rescue Service. For services to the Fire Service. (Irthlingborough, Northamptonshire)
- James Thomas Raymond Phillips. For services to the community in Winslow, Buckinghamshire. (Winslow, Buckinghamshire)
- Leslie Malcolm Phillips. For services to the community in Dorchester, Dorset. (Dorchester, Dorset)
- John Stanley Philp, Links Superintendent, Carnoustie Golf Club. For services to Golf. (Carnoustie, Angus)
- Bryan Pigott. For services to the community in Sheringham, Norfolk. (Sheringham, Norfolk)
- Mrs Pamela Pile, Chair of Governors, Rodborough Secondary School and Milford Infants School, Surrey. For services to Education. (Godalming, Surrey)
- Irene Gwendolin Pilgrim. For services to the community, especially the British Red Cross, in Thorpe St. Andrew, Norfolk. (Norwich, Norfolk)
- Joan Margaret Pilsbury. For services to the Crown Office. (Bures, Suffolk)
- Susan Jennifer Pipes. For services to Disabled Sport. (Hull, East Riding of Yorkshire)
- Mrs Susan Hanley-Place. For services to the Millennium Celebrations in Liverpool. (Liverpool, Merseyside)
- Eileen Plater. For services to the Wisbech Hospitals League of Friends, Cambridgeshire. (Wisbech, Cambridgeshire)
- Brian Ernest Platts. For services to the Manor Operatic Society in Sheffield, South Yorkshire. (Sheffield, South Yorkshire)
- Margaret Platts, Deputy Headteacher, Greenhead Grammar School, West Yorkshire. For services to Education and to the Community. (Wilsden, West Yorkshire)
- James William Plews. For services to Electrical Engineering. (Leeds, West Yorkshire)
- Mrs Audrey Rose Pollok, Personal Assistant to the Managing Director and Chairman, Three Valleys Water plc. For services to the Water Industry. (Harpenden, Hertfordshire)
- Mrs Sylvia Francise Pool, Lately Administrative Officer, Ministry of Defence. (Ipswich, Suffolk)
- John Benjamin Pooley. For services to the Hertford Motorcycle Training Centre. (Hertford, Hertfordshire)
- Brian Porter, JP, Manager, Employment Service, Department for Education and Employment. (Rochdale, Greater Manchester)
- David Edward Potter. For services to Bellringing in York. (York, North Yorkshire)
- Mrs Dorothy Enid Potter. For services to Heritage Conservation in Newcastle upon Tyne. (Newcastle upon Tyne, Tyne and Wear)
- Richard Shirvell Price, Founder, Primetime Television. For services to Independent Television. (Aldbourne, Wiltshire)
- Victor Macdonald Prow, UK Marketing Manager, Scotch Quality Beef and Lamb Association. For services to the Scottish Meat Industry.
- Dave Prowse, Actor. For services to charity and to Road Safety. (Croydon, Surrey)
- William Dick Pryde. For services to Kingdom Housing Association, Fife. (By Kelty, Fife)
- Mrs Elizabeth Mabel Coates Pugh. For services to the Builth Wells Cottage Hospital League of Friends, Powys. (Builth Wells, Powys)
- Harald Rhys Gordon Pulford. For services to the community in Bungay, Suffolk. (Bungay, Suffolk)
- Mrs Margaret Quinlan. For services to the community in Birmingham, West Midlands. (Birmingham, West Midlands)
- Brian Andrew Rae, Research Manager, Greater Glasgow Primary Care NHS Trust. For services to Psychiatric Patients. (Cumbernauld, Glasgow)
- Allan George Rainey. For services to the community and to Local Government. (Ballygawley, Tyrone)
- Alistair Woodrow Ramsay, Director, Scotland Against Drugs. For services to the Prevention of Drug Misuse. (Newlands, Glasgow)
- John Frederick Randall, Member, Chester City Council. For services to the community in Chester. (Chester, Cheshire)
- Peter John Randall, GM. For services to the community and to MENCAP in Leicester. (Leicester, Leicestershire)
- Mrs Mollie Randle, Founder, Midlands Art Centre. For services to Community Arts. (Sutton Coldfield, West Midlands)
- Harry Christopher Ranson, Governor, Sixth Form College, Farnborough. For services to Further Education. (Farnborough, Hampshire)
- Arthur Cecil Ratcliffe. For services to the community, especially Young People in Leeds. (Leeds, West Yorkshire)
- Leslie Ratcliffe. For services to the community in Bury, Lancashire. (Rossendale, Lancashire)
- Raymond Keith Rawlings, Lately Deputy Operations Manager, Group 4 Total Security Limited. For services to the UK Immigration Service. (Cheshunt, Hertfordshire)
- John Albert William Rayner, Managing Director, Tendring Hundred Water Services Ltd. For services to the Water Industry. (Colchester, Essex)
- Mrs Iris Mary Reason. For services to Elderly People in Hockley, Essex. (Hockley, Essex)
- Mrs Pauline Therese Reddington, Administrative Assistant, Department of Social Security. (Thornton-Cleveleys, Lancashire)
- Susan Reddington. For services to the Meanwood Valley Urban Farm Project, Leeds. (Leeds, West Yorkshire)
- Matthew Redmond. For services to the community in Fox Hollies and Acocks Green, Birmingham. (Birmingham, West Midlands)
- Col Gordon David Rees, TD. For services to the Soldiers', Sailors' and Airmen's Families Association in West Glamorgan. (Swansea)
- Michael James Reeve, Director, Fareport Training Organisation Ltd. For services to Training in Hampshire. (Fareham, Hampshire)
- Hugh Reid, Senior Chief Dental Technician, Lanarkshire Healthcare NHS Trust. For services to Dentistry. (Motherwell, Lanarkshire)
- Kenneth Reid, Sub-Officer, Fife Fire and Rescue Service. For services to the Fire Service and to the community in St. Andrew's. (St Andrew's, Fife)
- Nicholas Noel Reid, Prison Visitor, H.M. Prison Durham. For service to Prisoner Welfare. (Gilesgate, Durham)
- Sonia Iona Reid, Personal Secretary, Patent Office, Department of Trade and Industry. (Mitcham, Surrey)
- John David Lynn Reilly. For services to Young People through the Duke of Edinburgh Award Scheme. (Dundonald, Belfast)
- Dennis George Rensch, Chief Inspector, Essex Police. For services to the community. (Brentwood, Essex)
- Geoffrey Michael Reynolds. For services to Schools' Football. (Rossett, Wrexham)
- Mrs Margaret Patricia Reynolds, Office Manager, H.M. Treasury. (Croydon, Surrey)
- Elizabeth Anne Rhodes, Director, Shell Technology Enterprise Programme. For services to Training and Education in Business. (Wallingford, Oxfordshire)
- John Geoffrey Richardson, Member, Easingwold Town Council, North Yorkshire. For services to the community. (York, North Yorkshire)
- Lt Cdr Macdonald Richardson, R.N.R. For services to the Sea Cadet Corps in Manchester. (Manchester, Greater Manchester)
- Margaret Ellen Richardson. For services to Housing. (Belfast)
- Donald Riddell. For services to the Wessex Youth Orchestra. (Ferndown, Dorset)
- Matthew Ridley. For services to the Royal British Legion in Wiltshire. (Trowbridge, Wiltshire)
- Mrs Margaret Needham Robbie, Lately Personal Secretary, Scottish Executive. (Edinburgh)
- Mrs Myrna Katrina Roberts, Higher Executive Officer, Ministry of Defence. (Huntingdon, Cambridgeshire)
- Staveley Roberts. For services to Yachting. (Kilcreggan, Argyll and Bute)
- Mrs Elaine Evelyn Robie, Lately Administrative Officer, Department of Social Security. (London, N15)
- Mrs Glenys Maude Robinson, Organiser, Potteries and District Motorcycle Training Group. For services to Road Safety and to the community in Leek, Staffordshire. (Leek, Staffordshire)
- Mrs Joyce Robinson. For services to the community on the Cruddas Park Estate, Newcastle upon Tyne, Northumberland. (Newcastle upon Tyne, Tyne and Wear)
- Gerard Roddy, Director, Sports Development and Recreation, University of Bath. For services to Higher Education. (Bath, Somerset)
- William Edward Rodger, Lately Court Diversion Community Psychiatric Nurse. For services to Psychiatric Nursing in Rotherham, Yorkshire. (Sheffield, South Yorkshire)
- Leslie Rodgers. For services to the Police. (Belfast)
- Frederick John Rose, Limb Fitter. For services to Limbless People. (Birmingham, West Midlands)
- George Robertson Ross. For services to the Newcastle Breweries Charity Fund. (Newcastle upon Tyne, Tyne and Wear)
- Mrs Joan Elizabeth Ross, JP. For services to Business and to the community in Alness, Ross-shire. (Invergordon, Ross and Cromarty)
- Mrs Jenny Rosser, Secretary and Pension Manager, British Airways Pension Scheme. For services to BA Pensioners. (Hounslow, Middlesex)
- John Edward Rosser. For services to the Soldiers', Sailors' and Airmen's Families Association in West Glamorgan. (Swansea)
- Mrs Jane Mary Rothery. For services to Blind and Visually Impaired People in the Forest of Dean, Gloucestershire. (Roardean, Gloucestershire)
- Mrs Doreen Round, Catering Supervisor, Bede College and Cleaner, St. Michael's School, Billingham, Teesside. For services to Education. (Stockton-on-Tees, Durham)
- Mrs Christina Rowe, School Crossing Patrol, Huyton, Liverpool. For services to Road Safety. (Liverpool, Merseyside)
- Mrs Doris Taylor Rowe, Lately Typist, Ministry of Defence. (Sleaford, Lincolnshire)
- Dennis Rowland. For services to Young People in New Brancepeth and Ushaw Moor, County Durham. (New Brancepeth, Durham)
- Reginald George Rual. For services to the community, particularly Young People, in the Rhondda Valley. (Rhondda Cynon Taff)
- Robert Maurice Runyeard, Coxswain, Weymouth Lifeboat, Dorset. For services to Marine Safety. (Weymouth, Dorset)
- Mrs Marjory Russell, Chairperson, Visiting Committee, Cornton Vale Young Offenders' Institution. For services to Prisoner Welfare and to the community. (Bridge of Allan, Stirling and Falkirk)
- Donald William Rycroft, Lately Railway Conductor, Regional Railways, North East. For services to the Railway Industry. (Middlesbrough, Cleveland)
- Mrs Marlene Viola Ryder. For services to the Citizens Advice Bureau in Brent, London. (London, NW11)
- Mrs Elizabeth Carol Rymer, JP. For services to the community in Driffield, East Yorkshire. (Driffield, East Riding of Yorkshire)
- James Noel Sally. For services to the Police. (Belfast)
- Ronald James Whiteside Salthouse, TD. For services to Fire Safety and Crime Prevention in Greater Manchester. (Sale, Cheshire)
- Milton Samuels, Probation Services Officer. For services to the South Yorkshire Probation Service and to Community Relations. (Sheffield, South Yorkshire)
- Mrs Glennys Avery Sanders. For services to the Guillain–Barre Syndrome Support Group UK. (Sleaford, Lincolnshire)
- Irene Sandford, Singer. For services to Music. (Belfast)
- Christopher John Sandland. For services to Elderly and Disabled People in Battersea, London. (London, N1)
- Barry Sanigar, Probation Officer. For services to the Devon Probation Service. (Plymouth, Devon)
- Andrew John Saunders, Constable, Dorset Police. For services to Safety. (Verwood, Dorset)
- Arthur James Saunders. For services to the community in Brill, Buckinghamshire. (Aylesbury, Buckinghamshire)
- Mrs Jean Saunders. For services to the community in Holywell, North Wales. (Holywell, Flintshire)
- John Edward Savage. For services to the community, especially Young People, in West Sussex. (Worthing, West Sussex)
- John Sayer. For services to Hill Farming and to the conservation of the Yorkshire Dales. (Skipton, North Yorkshire)
- Mrs Pamela Kay Schweitzer. For services to the Age Exchange Reminiscence Centre, Blackheath, London. (London, SE3)
- Mrs Margaret Heather Scopes. For services to the community in Barnwell, Cambridgeshire. (Peterborough, Cambridgeshire)
- Alexander Scott. For services to Local Government and to the community in Galashiels.
- Mrs Anne Scott, Chairman, Old Hastings Preservation Society. For services to Conservation. (London, SE1)
- Kim Wendy Scott, Head of Exhibitions, Society of British Aerospace Companies. For services to Farnborough International. (Morden Park, Surrey)
- Malcolm Ramon Scott. For services to People with Learning Disabilities, especially through Sport, in the West Midlands. (Kingswinford, West Midlands)
- Margaret Scott. For services to the Boys' Brigade. (Ballyclare, Antrim)
- Mrs Pamela Dorothy Maud Seaton, DL. For services to the community, especially Young People, in Dorset. (Dorchester, Dorset)
- William Herbert Senior. For services to Local History and to Education in Yorkshire. (Huddersfield, West Yorkshire)
- Mrs Mary Sennet. For services to the community in Frimley, Surrey. (Fleet, Hampshire)
- Mrs Barbara Ruth Seward, Chair of Governors, Joydens Wood Infants School, Bexley, Kent. For services to Education. (Wilmington, Kent)
- Mrs Pannakumari Shah, Personal Secretary, Health and Safety Executive, Department of the Environment, Transport and the Regions. (Ilford, Essex)
- Julie Shattock, Administrative Assistant, DVLA, Department of the Environment, Transport and the Regions. (Swansea)
- Victor George Shaw, QPM. For services to the Police. (Belfast)
- Brian Sheard, Lately Level B Administrator, Crown Prosecution Service. (Oldham, Greater Manchester)
- Mrs Joan Shearman. For services to the community, especially to WRVS, in Hazel Grove, Cheshire. (Stockport, Cheshire)
- Mrs Sandra Ann Sheffield. For services to people with cancer in Peterborough, Cambridgeshire. (Peterborough, Cambridgeshire)
- Saleem Ullah Sheikh. For services to Community Relations in Merton, London. (London, SW19)
- Mrs Yasmin Sheikh. For services to Community Relations in Croydon, Surrey. (London, SW16)
- Mrs Hilda Mary Sheldon. For services to Biddulph in Bloom in Staffordshire. (Stoke-on-Trent, Staffordshire)
- Joseph Sheldon. For services to the community, especially Elderly People, in Farnham, Surrey. (Farnham, Surrey)
- Michael William Gordon Sheward, Milkman. For services to the community in Cheltenham, Gloucestershire. (Cheltenham, Gloucestershire)
- Mrs Agnes Shields. For services to Education. (Carrickfergus, Antrim)
- Andrew Michael Shipley, Pay Band 8, Employment Service, Department for Education and Employment. (Southall, Middlesex)
- Peter John Simmonds, Retired Officer 1, Ministry of Defence. (Rickmansworth, Hertfordshire)
- Keith William Simmons. For services to Deaf People in Bournemouth, Dorset. (Bournemouth, Dorset)
- David Clark Simpson. For services to the community in Johnshaven, Kincardineshire. (Johnshaven, Kincardineshire)
- Norman Murray Simpson, Trustee and Honorary Treasurer, Seagull Trust. For services to Disabled and Disadvantaged People. (Edinburgh)
- Mrs Pauline Sims, Site Manager, Cynon Valley Support Hospitals. For services to the NHS. (Aberdare, Rhondda Cynon Taff)
- Mrs Jane Sixsmith. For services to Hockey. (Sutton Coldfield, West Midlands)
- Victor Douglas Skeeles, Lately Member, Long Ashton Parish Council, Bristol. For services to the community. (Bristol)
- Mrs Frances Patricia Lavinia Skelton. For services to Nursery Education. (Belfast)
- Mrs Nora Elisa Amelia Skeys. For services to the community, especially Scouting and Guiding, in the Upton-upon-Severn District. (Worcester, Worcestershire)
- Owen Michael Slaney. For services to Music and to the community in St. David's, Pembrokeshire. (St Davids, Pembrokeshire)
- Herzl Sless. For services to the community in Hove, East Sussex. (Hove, East Sussex)
- Iain Masson Smart. For services to the community on the Isle of Skye. (Isle of Skye, Ross and Cromarty)
- John Edgar Smith. For services to the St. John Ambulance Brigade in Surrey. (Betchworth, Surrey)
- Peter William Smith, Higher Scientific Officer, Defence Evaluation and Research Agency, Ministry of Defence. (Malvern, Worcestershire)
- Charles Philip Smith, Bookbinder. For services to Art. (Chippenham, Wiltshire)
- Robert Rennie Smith, Team Leader, Arrochar Mountain Rescue Team. For services to Mountain Rescue. (Arrochar, Dunbartonshire)
- Stephen David Smith. For services to the Beth Shalom Holocaust Memorial Centre, Nottinghamshire. (Newark, Nottinghamshire)
- Ambrose William Smoker, Instructor, Boys' Brigade, London. For services to Young People. (London, SE24)
- Gareth Eyre Somerset, Senior Principal Consultant, Systems Engineering and Assessment Ltd. For services to the Defence Industry. (Bath, Somerset)
- Mrs Lilian Sowerby. For services to the community in Ushaw Moor, County Durham. (Ushaw Moor, Durham)
- Michael John Sparks. For services to Young People, especially the Boys' Brigade, in Barnet, Hertfordshire. (Barnet, Hertfordshire)
- James Alexander Speers. For political and public service. (Hamiltonsbawn, Armagh)
- Mrs Doreen Thelma Spence, Member, Ripon City Council. For services to the community in Ripon. (Ripon, North Yorkshire)
- Edward Millar Spence. For services to the Sugarcraft Guild and Industry. (Bournemouth, Dorset)
- Edgar John Brewis Staddon. For services to the community in Weston-super-Mare, Somerset. (Weston-super-Mare, Somerset)
- Mrs Theresa Stafford, Catering Manager. For services to the Millennium Dome. (London, E16)
- Mrs Joan Stamp, Clinical Nurse Specialist. For services to the Rheumatology Education and Practice. (Whitby, North Yorkshire)
- Mrs Pamela Mary Standen. For services to OXFAM in Cranleigh, Surrey. (Cranleigh, Surrey)
- John Raoul Wilmot Stansfeld. For services to the YMCA in Montrose, Angus. (Montrose, Angus)
- Roger Ernest Starling, Administrative Assistant, Department of Social Security. (Solihull, West Midlands)
- Tim Stead. For services to the Millennium Celebrations in Scotland.
- Iris Steedman. For services to the St. Mary Magdalene and Holy Jesus Trust, Newcastle upon Tyne. (Newcastle upon Tyne, Tyne and Wear)
- Keir Frederick Steel, Constable, Metropolitan Police Service. For services to the Police Federation. (Northolt, Middlesex)
- John Steele. For services to the Soldiers', Sailors' and Airmen's Families Association in Derbyshire. (Alfreton, Derbyshire)
- Mrs May Steele, JP. For political and public service. (Larne, Antrim)
- Norman William Steer, Lately Probation Health Co-ordinator, HM Prison Blundeston. For services to the Prison Service. (Harleston, Norfolk)
- Michael John Stentiford. For services to Nature Conservation, especially the RSPB, on Jersey. (Trinity, Jersey)
- John David Stephenson. For services to Drama and Music on Guernsey. (Guernsey, Channel Islands)
- Alastair James Stewart. For services to the Grampian Fire Brigade. (Aberdeen)
- Mrs Kathleen Marr Stewart, Headteacher, Barry Primary School, Carnoustie. For services to Education. (Barnhill, Dundee)
- Mrs Mavis Victoria Powell Stewart. For services to the community in South East London. (London, SE6)
- Mrs Jillian Stidever. For services to Disabled Sport in Leicestershire. (Markfield, Leicestershire)
- Norbert Stiles, Member, England Team, World Cup 1966. For services to Association Football. (Manchester, Greater Manchester)
- Frederick Stocks, JP. For services to the community in Great Glen, Leicestershire. (Great Glen, Leicestershire)
- Rodney Hargreaves Stott. For services to the community in Rochdale, Greater Manchester. (Rochdale, Greater Manchester)
- Mrs Audrey Surtees. For services to Elderly People, especially at Bishop Creighton House, in Fulham, London. (London, W14)
- Mrs Daphne Grace Suttle, JP. For services to the community and to Elderly People in Penicuik, Midlothian. (Penicuik, Midlothian)
- Mrs Nellie Doreen Swift. For services to the West Hartlepool Old Age Pensioners' Welfare Association, Cleveland. (Cleveland, North Yorkshire)
- Peter John Swinscoe. For services to the community in Worksop, Nottinghamshire. (Retford, Nottinghamshire)
- Nigel Szembel, TD. Head, Corporate Affairs and Press, Corporation of London. For services to the City of London. (London, SW11)
- Hamish Tait. For services to the Water Service in Glasgow. (Milngavie, Dunbartonshire)
- Fred Taylor. For services to the community, especially the Royal British Legion, in Bilston, West Midlands. (Bilston, West Midlands)
- Frederick William Surry Taylor. For services to Mental Health and to the community in Worthing, West Sussex. (Steyning, West Sussex)
- Jack Leonard Taylor, JP For services to the community in Wetherby, West Yorkshire. (Wetherby, West Yorkshire)
- Mrs Judy Alison Taylor. For services to Critical Care in the UK and Nepal. (Balloch, Dunbartonshire)
- Mrs Marjory Primrose Taylor. For services to the Wrens' Association in Hampshire. (Southampton, Hampshire)
- Mrs Rosalind Taylor. For services to the Courtyard Project, Goole, East Yorkshire. (Nr Goole, East Riding of Yorkshire)
- Warwick Harry Taylor. For services to the Bevin Boys' Association. (Southampton, Hampshire)
- Mrs Maureen Ann Ternent. For services to the Local Education Authority in Northumberland. (Choppington, Northumberland)
- Alan Edward Teulon. For services to the Millennium Greens Initiative and to Countryside Management in Northamptonshire. (Northamptonshire)
- Martin Edwin Thacker. For services to the Chesterfield Deaf Society, Derbyshire. (Chesterfield, Derbyshire)
- Gerald Seymour Thirst. For services to the Stalham Brass Band, Norfolk. (Happisburgh, Norfolk)
- Mary Henrietta Agnes Somerville Thomas. For services to the Dark Horse Venture. (Wirral)
- Meirion Thomas. For services to the community in Llangadog, Carmarthenshire. (Llangadog, Carmarthenshire)
- Clive Thompsett. For services to the Littleton and Harestock Village Hall Project, Hampshire. (Winchester, Hampshire)
- Mrs Gillian Thompson. For services to the community in Lynemouth, Northumberland. (Morpeth, Northumberland)
- William Thompson. For services to the Millennium Dome. (Ballachulish, Argyll and Bute)
- Mrs Dorothy May Till. For services to the community, particularly SCOPE, in Worthing, West Sussex. (Worthing, West Sussex)
- Arthur Kenneth Timmis, JP. For services to the Coronary Care Unit, New Cross Hospital. (Wolverhampton, West Midlands)
- Alan Fred Titchmarsh, Gardener and Television Presenter. For services to Horticulture and to Broadcasting. (Alton, Hampshire)
- Martyn John Robert Todd. For services to the Strangford Stone. (Lisburn, Down)
- Muriel Todd. For services to the community. (Carrickfergus, Belfast)
- Cyril Edward Tomlinson. For services to the community in Shepton Mallet, Somerset. (Shepton Mallet, Somerset)
- Kelvin Michael Trevett. For services to the community in Poole, Dorset. (Poole, Dorset)
- Donald William Foster Trewern, Member, St. Levan Parish Council. For services to the community in Penwith, Cornwall. (Penzance, Cornwall)
- Mildred Jane Tribble. For charitable services in Holsworthy, Devon. (Holsworthy, Devon)
- Mrs Irene Dorothea Trim. For services to the Samaritans Prison Volunteer Scheme, H.M. Prison, Liverpool. (Southport, Merseyside)
- Mrs Mary Virginia Trotter, JP. For services to the community in Staindrop, County Durham. (Darlington, Durham)
- Alison Truefitt. For services to the community in Llanbadarn Fynydd, Powys. (Llandrindod Wells, Powys)
- Hing Yu Tsang. For services to the Chinese community in Scotland.
- Graham Frederick Tubb, Lately Acting Regional Officer, South East England Regional Assembly. For services to Regional Governance. (Lewes, East Sussex)
- Glenn Tubman. For services to the community in Cumbria. (Whitehaven, Cumbria)
- Derek Fletcher Tunstall, Volunteer Warden. For services to the Lake District Park. (Frizington, Cumbria)
- Mrs Joyce Turner. For services to the Civil Service Retirement Fellowship and the Civil Service Pensioners' Alliance in Plymouth, Devon. (Plymouth, Devon)
- Marion Joyce Twitchett, Executive Officer, Ministry of Agriculture, Fisheries and Food. (Bury St Edmunds, Suffolk)
- Mrs Queenie Twitty. For services to Basildon Hospitals' League of Friends, Essex. (Basildon, Essex)
- Mrs Joyce Margaret Tyson. For services to Lifesaving in Nottinghamshire. (Nottingham, Nottinghamshire)
- Mrs Agnes Urquhart. For services to Health Charities and to the community in Glencarse, Perth. (Glencarse, Perth and Kinross)
- Nicholas John Utting. For services to Agriculture and to the community in Cumbria. (Penrith, Cumbria)
- Mrs Pearl Valentine. For services to the Library Service. (Ballymena, Antrim)
- Andreas Johannes Hendricus Van Weerdenburg, JP. For services to Norweb plc. (Ashton-under-Lyne, Lancashire)
- Mrs Marian May Vanstone, For services to the Dame Hannah Rogers School for Physically Handicapped Children in Ivybridge, Devon. (Newton Poppleford, Devon)
- Jeffrey Barry Vent, Appeal Secretary, Coventry School Foundation. For services to Education. (Coventry, West Midlands)
- Douglas Vernon, TD. For services to the community in Consett and Derwentside, County Durham. (Consett, Durham)
- Mrs Rosaleen Dolores Wadforth, Debt Management Unit Caseworker, H.M. Board of Customs and Excise. (Newry, Down)
- Mrs Kathleen Wain. For services to the community in Burford, Oxfordshire. (Burford, Oxfordshire)
- Martin Wainwright. For services to the National Lottery Charities Board in Yorkshire and Humberside. (Leeds, West Yorkshire)
- Antony Charles Wakeham. For services to the Equestrian Industry and to Equestrian Safety. (Bramham, West Yorkshire)
- Mrs Annette Dorothea Waldman. For services to Arthritis Care in the Borough of Richmond-upon-Thames. (Richmond, Surrey)
- Eileen Myfanwy Walker. For services to the community, especially Guiding, in Thornbury, South Gloucestershire. (Thornbury, Gloucestershire)
- George Walker, Governor, Emley First School, Huddersfield, West Yorkshire. For services to Education and to the community. (Huddersfield, West Yorkshire)
- Mrs Margaret Scott Walker. For services to the community in Eyemouth, Berwickshire. (Eyemouth, Berwickshire)
- Michael John Walker, Technologist BAe. For services to the Defence Industry. (Lytham St Annes, Lancashire)
- Robert Reginald Wall. For services to the community, particularly Education in Station Town, County Durham. (Station Town, Durham)
- Mrs Susan Gay Walton, Lately Chief Steward, School of Management Studies for the Service Sector, University of Surrey. For services to Higher Education. (West Byfleet, Surrey)
- Michael Warner. For services to Business and to the community in Lincolnshire. (Nr Grantham, Lincolnshire)
- Mrs Anna Manwah Watson. For services to Ethnic Minorities. (Belfast)
- David Watson, Catering Manager, University College, Durham. For services to Education. (Durham)
- Lex Blyth Watson. For services to Scouting, particularly for Handicapped Young People, in Scotland. (Giffnock, Glasgow)
- Robert McLellan Watson. For services to Meteorology in Dumfries and Galloway. (Castle Douglas, Dumfries)
- Jessie Lovie Watt, Lately Crofters' Commissioner. For services to Crofting and to Agriculture in Shetland and Orkney. (Insch, Aberdeenshire)
- Norman Watt, Lately Senior Steward, Edinburgh Castle, Scottish Executive. (Edinburgh)
- Mrs Julie Bernadette Watters, Health Visitor. For services to Health Visiting and to the Promotion of Breastfeeding in Lanarkshire. (Wishaw, Lanarkshire)
- Barry Watts. For services to the Mind Millennium Award Scheme. (London, NW4)
- Mrs Doreen Winifred Fennell Way, Head of Operations, The Learning and Business Link Co. Ltd. For services to Investors in People in Kent. (Hunton, Kent)
- Mrs Beryl Faith Wearmouth. For services to the community in Hitchin, Hertfordshire. (Hitchin, Hertfordshire)
- Professor Colin Edward Webb, FRS. For services to the UK Laser Industry. (Oxford, Oxfordshire)
- Sydney Webster, Firefighter, Merseyside Fire Brigade. For services to Fire Safety Education. (Bootle, Merseyside)
- Jean Welch, Lately Support Grade Band 1, Ministry of Agriculture, Fisheries and Food. (London, SE5)
- Mrs Ann Pauline Welsh, Senior Personal Secretary, Department of Trade and Industry. (Fleet, Hampshire)
- Mrs Margaret Whalley, Founder, Pen Green Centre for Early Years, Corby, Northamptonshire. For services to Young Children. (Corby, Northamptonshire)
- Mrs Susan Patricia Whalley, Information Technology Manager, William Austin Junior School, Luton. For services to Education. (Luton, Bedfordshire)
- Colin Gordon White, Honorary Secretary, Association of Retired HMI in England and Wales. For services to Education. (Reading, Berkshire)
- Jennifer Susan White. For services to the National Disability Council. (London, NW3)
- Mrs Mavis Ena White. For services to the Benefits Agency and to the community in Bridgwater, Somerset. (Bridgwater, Somerset)
- Mrs Patricia Ann White. For services to the Glan Hafren NHS Trust. (Chepstow, Gwynedd)
- Roger Arthur White. For services to Nursing. (Thornton Heath, Surrey)
- Walter Edwin White. For services to Agriculture in Babworth, Nottinghamshire. (Retford, Nottinghamshire)
- Donald Brian Whitehouse. For services to Food Safety. (Bowdon, Cheshire)
- Lavina Whitfield. For services to Homeless People in Chester, Cheshire. (Chester, Cheshire)
- Leslie Albert Wilkins. For services to the Royal Mail in Andover, Hampshire and to Humanitarian Relief. (Andover, Hampshire)
- Robert Henry Wilkinson, Lately Commissionaire, Sheffield Hallam University. For services to Higher Education. (Sheffield, South Yorkshire)
- Cherie Williams. For services to the New Millennium Experience Company. (Bexley, Kent)
- Edward Gordon Williams, Chair of Governors, Birkenhead Sixth Form College. For services to Education and to the community. (Wirral)
- George Richard Lindsey Williams. For services to Forestry and to the Forestry Commission. (Rhayader, Powys)
- Mrs Margaret Leita Lister-Williams, DL. For services to the community in West Sussex. (Hassocks, West Sussex)
- Vivian Edward Williams. For services to the community in Penarth, Vale of Glamorgan. (Penarth, Vale of Glamorgan)
- Douglas G. Williamson, Member, Rail Users' Consultative Committee for Scotland. For services to Consumers in Scotland. (Lumsden by Huntley, Aberdeenshire)
- Mrs Elizabeth Cameron Willsher. For services to the Recording of Scotland's Graveyard Monuments. (St Andrews, Fife)
- John Wilson, JP. For services to Local Government and to the community on the Isle of Mull, Argyll. (Leicester, Leicestershire)
- Mrs May Catherine Wilson. For services to War Pensioners and War Widows. (Perthshire, Perth and Kinross)
- Mrs Peggy Wilson. For services to the community in Hartley, Kent. (Longfield, Kent)
- Peter Stafford Wilson, Theatre Director, Theatre Royal, Norwich. For services to Drama. (London, WC2H)
- Ray Wilson, Member, England Team, World Cup 1966. For services to Association Football. (Halifax, West Yorkshire)
- Alan Keith Windle. For services to the Electronics Industry. (Guildford, Surrey)
- Barbara Anne Windsor, Actress. For services to Entertainment. (London, W1)
- Mrs Bernadette Elizabeth Windsor, Telephonist. For services to the Chartered Institute of Management Accountants. (Dagenham, Essex)
- Gerald Amery Wingrove. For services to Model Engineering. (Lincoln, Lincolnshire)
- Albert Charles Winter. For services to the community in Sheffield, South Yorkshire. (Sheffield, South Yorkshire)
- Mrs Hazel Elizabeth Womersley, Higher Executive Officer, Home Office. (Coulsdon, Surrey)
- David Ernest Wood, Firefighter, South Yorkshire Fire and Rescue Service. For services to the Fire Service National Benevolent Fund. (Sheffield, South Yorkshire)
- Terence Woodhead. For services to the Grassington Millennium Project, North Yorkshire. (Grassington, North Yorkshire)
- Lt Col Ronald Geoffrey Woodhouse, DL. For services to War Pensions Committees. (Illminster, Somerset)
- Edward James Woods, Constable, Norfolk Constabulary. For services to Young People. (Great Yarmouth, Norfolk)
- George Wood, JP. For services to the community in Preston, Lancashire. (Basingstoke, Hampshire)
- Mrs Eunice Anna Mary Woof. For services to the community, especially through Music, in Aughton, Lancashire. (Ormskirk, Lancashire)
- Robert Alfred Woolley. For services to the Manufacturing Sector in the West Midlands. (Sutton Coldfield, West Midlands)
- Kuldeep Singh Wouhra, Founder, East End Foods. For services to the Ethnic Food Industry. (Stourport-on-Severn, Worcestershire)
- David William Robert Wright. For services to the community in Harlow, Essex. (Bishop's Stortford, Hertfordshire)
- Ian Wright. For services to Association Football. (Shirley Croydon, Surrey)
- Richard Eric Wright. For charitable services on Merseyside. (Blackpool, Lancashire)
- Donald Nichol Wylie. For services to the Dumfries Rugby Club. (Dumfries)
- Mrs Helen Elizabeth Wyllie, Chairman, League of Hospital Friends, Inverclyde Royal Hospital. For services to Patient Welfare. (Greenock, Renfrewshire)
- Mrs Carole Ann Wynn, Head, Careers Service, University of Portsmouth. For services to Careers Education. (Fareham, Hampshire)
- Bernard William Yates. For services to the British Limbless Ex-Service Men's Association in the West Midlands. (Walsall, West Midlands)
- James Young, Health and Safety Officer. For services to the Bonas Machine Company Ltd. (Sunderland, Tyne and Wear)
- Kenneth Joseph Young, County International Adviser, Cheshire Scouts. For services to Scouting and to Young People. (South Wirral, Cheshire)
- Noel Young. For services to the community, especially People with Learning Disabilities, in Torfaen. (Cwmbran, Torfaen)

Diplomatic and Overseas list

- Stuart Alves, For services to healthcare in Bulgaria.
- Shemaiah Chukwunyere Azumah, Commercial Officer, Port Harcourt.
- Katherine Bainbridge, For services to healthcare in Romania.
- Mark Robert Baker, For services to agriculture in China.
- Charles George Carbonell-Bamford, For services to British interests in Colombia.
- Gerard Barron, Honorary British Consul, Boulogne-sur-Mer.
- Victor John Bertolaso, Lately Head, Visual Aids Centre, N.A.T.O.
- Valerie Ann Bothamley, For services to healthcare in India.
- Michael George Bowerman, For services to education, Cayman Islands.
- Christopher Adrian Bullock, Second Secretary, Foreign and Commonwealth Office.
- John Patrick Casey, For services to British interests, Cyprus.
- Mrs Janice Laura Cassant, Personal assistant to HM Consul-General, Marseilles.
- Mrs Felicity Mary Cave, For services to British-Russian relations.
- Mrs Dorothy Dawn Channel, For services to the British community in California.
- Maj Ian Allan Crowther, For services to British ex-servicemen in South Africa.
- Gilbert Ferguson Park Currie, For services to healthcare in Kenya.
- Neville Antonio Dublin, For services to communications, Montserrat.
- Mark Jeremy Dytham, For services to British architecture and culture in Japan.
- James Fletcher, Chief Security Officer, British High Commission, Nairobi.
- Jennifer Mary Goodwin, For services to childcare overseas.
- Andrew Martin Graham, British Honorary Consul, Cagliari.
- Dr Edward Cecil Harris, For services to architectural, maritime and cultural history, Bermuda.
- James Edward Hasler, For services to the children of British Forces, Cyprus.
- Hilton Gray Hill, For community service, Bermuda.
- Mrs Margaret Isobel Hofmaier, For services to the British community in Vienna.
- Mrs Elizabeth Homewood, For welfare services to the British community, Costa Blanca, Spain.
- Mrs Winifred Hughes, For welfare services to the British community, São Paulo.
- Paul Michael Jackson, Lately Attache, British Embassy, Belgrade.
- Mrs Joan Ann Jones, For services to the community, Botswana.
- Simon Lessing, For services to triathlon.
- Felicity Manuella Lewis, Lately Translator, European Commission.
- William Wavell Magor, Lately First secretary, HM Embassy, Tel Aviv.
- Mrs Daphne Yolande Matthews, For services to the British community, Pau, France.
- Gerard McGurk, Management Officer and vice-Consul, HM Embassy, Skopje.
- Mrs Janet Ann Dolder de Mena, For welfare services to the community, Chile.
- Christopher Avison Milne, British Honorary Consul, Surabaya.
- Mrs Muriel Susan Moring, First Secretary, Foreign and Commonwealth Office.
- Elizabeth Morris, Lately personal assistant to the Executive Secretary, UN Economic Commission for Europe. (Cambridge, Cambridgeshire)
- Mrs Caroline Morrissey, Director, British Council, Switzerland.
- Geoffrey Michael Mumford, For services to international youth adventure training.
- Mrs Pamela Jean Clements-Nichols, For services to the British community in Brussels.
- Mrs Carol Owen, For services to the community, Cayman Islands.
- John Edward Packer, For services to British interests in Sweden.
- Mrs Lillian Josephine Pitaluga, For services to the community, Gibraltar.
- Philip Marcus Pitt, MC For services to the British community in Malawi.
- James Prentice Powell, For services to sport and the community, Cayman Islands.
- Dr Raymond Charles Raymond, Vice Consul, British Consulate-General, New York.
- Mrs Judith Ann Razek, For services to the arts in Oman.
- Brian Frederick Reeve, Lately president, Churchill Statue Association, France.
- Dr Leon William Rheims, For welfare services to the British community, São Paulo.
- Viviano Domenico Rossi, For services to British interests in France.
- Michael William Roulston, Headmaster, British School, Tokyo.
- David John Scrimgeour, Director, Locate in Scotland, Germany.
- Richard David Shackleton, Lately Third Secretary, HM Embassy, Bogota.
- Michael David Simpson, For services to architecture in Papua New Guinea.
- Clive Patrick Swain, For services to the British community in Chile.
- Thomas Toynton, Security Officer, British Embassy, Manila.
- Mrs Dalton Eileen Tucker, For services to education, Bermuda.
- Lisa Jane Tylee, For services to charitable organisations, Caracas.
- Mrs Jennifer Wallum, For services to the local community in the Philippines.
- Susana, Lady Walton, For services to British interests, Italy.
- Patrick John Warren, For services to community welfare, Sierra Leone.
- Mrs Jennifer Weineck, For services to the British community in Oporto.
- Bishop Franklyn Rudolf Williams, For services to community welfare, Turks and Caicos Islands.
- Mrs Cynthia Mary Worringham, Economic Assistant, British High Commission, Canberra.

=== Queen's Commendation For Valuable Service ===
The Queen's Commendation for Valuable Service is a British military award that recognises meritorious service during, or in support of, operations.

- CPO Airman Stephen John Gulliver,
- Lt David Leslie Hewitt, Royal Navy.
- Cdr David George Steel, Royal Navy.
- Maj Carl Cheswick Benfield, Corps of Royal Engineers.
- Staff Sgt Ricky Mark Cannon, Adjutant General's Corps.
- Staff Sgt Paul Jason Carney, Corps of Royal Electrical and Mechanical Engineers.
- Lt Col Nicholas Anthony Clissitt, Royal Regiment of Artillery.
- WO Class 2 Jeremy Francis Cross, The Royal Logistic Corps.
- Maj Gen Francis Richard Dannatt, CBE, MC Late The Green Howards.
- Staff Sgt Matthew Christopher Duff, Royal Corps of Signals.
- Brig Adrian Robert Freer, OBE Late The Parachute Regiment.
- Maj Peter Joe Fuller, Corps of Royal Engineers.
- Col Ritson Indolph Harrison, OBE Late The Royal Logistic Corps.
- Lt Col Stephen John Derek Harrison, MBE Royal Tank Regiment.
- Lt Col Michael Guy Hickson, The Royal Logistic Corps.
- Maj Andrew Timothy David Jackson, The Parachute Regiment.
- Sgt Karen Dorothy Jamieson, Queen Alexandra's Royal Army Nursing Corps.
- Maj Ian David Jefferies, MBE Intelligence Corps.
- Signaller Darren Paul Kirby, Royal Corps of Signals.
- Sgt James Anderson MacLachlan, Adjutant General's Corps.
- Pte Gordon Ashley Mallett, Adjutant General's Corps.
- WO Class 2 Raymond Francis Mercer, The Royal Logistic Corps.
- Brig David Wyndham Montgomery, Late The Royal Dragoon Guards.
- Lt Col Jonathan Graeme Mullin, MBE Corps of Royal Engineers.
- Cpl David John Nelson, Corps of Royal Engineers.
- Capt Andrew David Norris, Corps of Royal Engineers.
- Lt Col Antony William Phillips, MBE The Royal Logistic Corps.
- Capt Janet Mary Pilgrim, Queen Alexandra's Royal Army Nursing Corps.
- Maj Steven Paul Simonini, BEM Corps of Royal Engineers.
- Lt Col Ian Robert Sinclair, Royal Regiment of Artillery.
- Maj Callum Norman Robert Skeat, Corps of Royal Engineers.
- WO Class 2 Joseph Colley St Mart, The Parachute Regiment.
- Capt Matthew Thomas Hedley Tomlyn, Intelligence Corps.
- Capt Matthew Paul Walton-Knight, Corps of Royal Engineers.
- Maj Roger Patrick Warren, Royal Regiment of Artillery.
- Maj David Wilson, Corps of Royal Engineers.
- Col John Noel Wolsey, OBE Late Adjutant General's Corps.
- Maj Andrew Mark Wright, The Parachute Regiment.
- Wing Cdr Timothy Almond, MBE Royal Air Force.
- Cpl Russell Steven Banham, Royal Air Force.
- Flt Lt Luke Collins, Royal Air Force.
- Sgt Michael John Davies, Royal Air Force.
- Flt Lt Graham Jeffrey Dick, Royal Air Force.
- Sqn Ldr Michael Ernest Eagles, Royal Air Force.
- Flt Lt Andrew Michael Eccleston, Royal Air Force.
- Flt Lt Adrian Robert Leonard, Royal Air Force.
- Sgt Gordon David Marshall, Royal Air Force.
- Flt Lt Nigel Anthony Pitchforth, Royal Air Force.
- Flt Lt Stephen Edward Reeves, Royal Air Force.
- Sqn Ldr Stephen Jeffrey Shell, Royal Air Force

=== Royal Red Cross ===
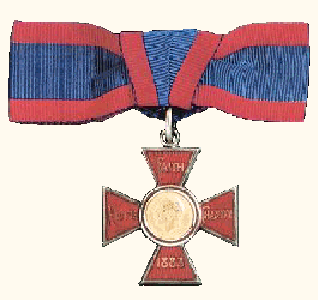
The Royal Red Cross for exceptional services in military nursing

The Royal Red Cross is a military decoration awarded for exceptional services in military nursing. There are two classes of medal, 1 person was made an Ordinary Member in the 2000 New Years Honours list.

- Cdr Jane Mary Morley, R.D., Queen Alexandra's Royal Naval Nursing Service.

=== Queen's Volunteer Reserves Medal (QVRM) ===
The Queen's Volunteer Reserves Medal (QVRM) is a medal presented to members of the three volunteer reserve forces of the United Kingdom armed forces (Royal Naval Reserve, Territorial Army and Royal Auxiliary Air Force) for exemplary meritorious service in the conduct of their duties; 6 service personnel were awarded medals.

Navy

- WO 2nd Class Francis Patrick McKenna, Royal Marines Reserve.

Army

- Staff Sgt Leonard John Clark, Adjutant General's Corps, Territorial Army.
- Lt Col Allan Colin Campbell Lapsley, TD Royal Corps of Signals, Territorial Army.
- WO Class 2 David Lowry, Adjutant General's Corps, Territorial Army.
- WO Class 2 Douglas Young Smith, Royal Corps of Signals, Territorial Army.
- Brig Anthony Peter Verey, TD, ADC Late Royal Corps of Signals, Territorial Army.

=== Queen's Police Medal ===
The Queen's Police Medal (QPM) is awarded to police officers in the United Kingdom and Commonwealth for distinguished service or gallantry; 25 medals were awarded for distinguished service.

==== England and Wales ====
- Robert Ayling, Deputy Chief Constable, Kent County Constabulary.
- Michael Brian Benning, Superintendent, Essex Police.
- David Charles Booth, Chief Superintendent, Greater Manchester Police.
- John Burbeck, Assistant Chief Constable, West Mercia Constabulary.
- Raymond Hugh Campbell, Chief Inspector, Northamptonshire Police.
- Michael James Cox, Sergeant, South Wales Police.
- Frederick William Eatherton, Chief Superintendent, Police Information Technology Organisation.
- Leslie Howard Fiander, Detective Constable, National Criminal Intelligence Service.
- Paul Adam Green, Chief Superintendent, Metropolitan Police Service.
- Timothy Hollis, Assistant Chief Constable, South Yorkshire Police.
- Timothy Patrick O'Connor, Detective Superintendent, Organised and International Crime Directorate, Home Office.
- Jeffrey Edward Rees, Detective Chief Superintendent, Metropolitan Police Service.
- Paul Robert Stephenson, Assistant Chief Constable, Lancashire Police.
- Andrew Stewart Trotter, Deputy Assistant Commissioner, Metropolitan Police Service.
- David Augustine Warren, Lately Chief Superintendent, Avon and Somerset Constabulary.
- Barbara Wilding, Deputy Assistant Commissioner, Metropolitan Police Service.
- Susan Irene Woolfenden, Chief Inspector, Merseyside Police.

==== Scotland ====
- Owen Charles Conlan, Constable, Central Scotland Police.
- George Morrow Matchett, Chief Superintendent, Central Scotland Police.
- David George Hunter Smith, Superintendent, Strathclyde Police.

==== Northern Ireland ====
- William James Baxter, Superintendent, Royal Ulster Constabulary.
- William Robert Ivan Bethel, Detective Sergeant, Royal Ulster Constabulary.
- Thomas John Boyd, Superintendent, Royal Ulster Constabulary.
- Alfred Desmond Cousley, Superintendent, Royal Ulster Constabulary.

==== Falkland Islands ====
- Kenneth David Greenland, Superintendent, lately Chief Police Officer, Royal Falkland Islands Police.

=== Queen's Fire Service Medal ===
The Queen's Fire Service Medal is awarded to members of the fire services in the United Kingdom and Commonwealth of Nations for distinguished service; 11 medals were awarded.

==== England and Wales ====
- Norman David Barrow, Station Officer, Gloucestershire Fire and Rescue Service.
- John Patrick Gaunt, Lately Chief Fire Officer, Defence Fire Services.
- Eric Robinson, Station Officer, Cumbria Fire Service.
- David Anthony Turner, Chief Fire Officer, Essex County Fire and Rescue Service.
- Alan Christopher John Wroclawski, Assistant Chief Fire Officer, Kent Fire Brigade.

==== Scotland ====
- Angus Alexander Ferrier, Retained Sub-Officer, Fife Fire and Rescue Service.
- John Stewart, Assistant Firemaster, Strathclyde Fire Brigade.
- John Williams, Firemaster, Grampian Fire Brigade.

==== Northern Ireland ====
- John Harrison McCaughan, Senior Divisional Officer, Belfast Fire Brigade.

=== Colonial Police and Fire Service Medal ===
- Joseph Louis Santos, Inspector, Royal Gibraltar Police.
- Donald James Watler, Chief Inspector, Royal Cayman Islands Police.
