= Great Britain at the 1988 Summer Olympics =

- Flag of the United Kingdom
- IOC code: GBR
- NOC: British Olympic Association

in Seoul
- Competitors: 345 (219 men and 126 women) in 22 sports
- Flag bearers: Ian Taylor (opening); Malcolm Cooper (closing)
- Medals Ranked 12th: Gold 5 Silver 10 Bronze 9 Total 24

Summer Olympics appearances (overview)
- 1896; 1900; 1904; 1908; 1912; 1920; 1924; 1928; 1932; 1936; 1948; 1952; 1956; 1960; 1964; 1968; 1972; 1976; 1980; 1984; 1988; 1992; 1996; 2000; 2004; 2008; 2012; 2016; 2020; 2024

Other related appearances
- 1906 Intercalated Games

Great Britain, represented by the British Olympic Association (BOA), competed at the 1988 Summer Olympics in Seoul, South Korea. 345 competitors, 219 men and 126 women, took part in 191 events in 22 sports. British athletes have competed in every Summer Olympic Games.

Similarly to the previous two Summer Olympics, British athletes once again won five gold medals.

== Medallists ==
Medals by discipline
Discipline	Gold medal	Silver medal	Bronze medal	Total
Swimming	1	1	1	3
Shooting	1	1	0	2
Rowing	1	0	1	2
Field hockey	1	0	0	1
Sailing	1	0	0	1
Athletics	0	6	2	8
Equestrian	0	2	1	3
Archery	0	0	1	1
Boxing	0	0	1	1
Judo	0	0	1	1
Modern pentathlon	0	0	1	1
Total	5	10	9	24

Medal	Name	Sport	Event	Date
Gold	Adrian Moorhouse	Swimming	Men's 100 metre breaststroke	19 September
Gold	Malcolm Cooper	Shooting	Men's 50 metre rifle three positions	22 September
Gold	Andy Holmes; Steven Redgrave	Rowing	Men's coxless pair	24 September
Gold	Mike McIntyre; Bryn Vaile	Sailing	Star	27 September
Gold	Great Britain men's national field hockey team: Ian Taylor; Veryan Pappin; David Faulkner; Paul Barber; Sam Martin; Jon Potter; Richard Dodds; Martyn Grimley; Steve Batchelor; Richard Leman; Jimmy Kirkwood; Kulbir Bhaura; Sean Kerly; Robert Clift; Imran Sherwani; Russell Garcia	Field hockey	Men's tournament	1 October
Silver	Alister Allan	Shooting	Men's 50 metre rifle three positions	22 September
Silver	Ian Stark	Equestrian	Individual eventing	22 September
Silver	Virginia Leng; Mark Phillips; Ian Stark; Karen Straker	Equestrian	Team eventing	22 September
Silver	Nick Gillingham	Swimming	Men's 200 metre breaststroke	23 September
Silver	Linford Christie	Athletics	Men's 100 metres	24 September
Silver	Colin Jackson	Athletics	Men's 110 metres hurdles	26 September
Silver	Fatima Whitbread	Athletics	Women's javelin throw	26 September
Silver	Liz McColgan	Athletics	Women's 10,000 metres	30 September
Silver	Peter Elliott	Athletics	Men's 1500 metres	1 October
Silver	Elliot Bunney; Clarence Callender; Linford Christie; Mike McFarlane; John Regis	Athletics	Men's 4 × 100 metres relay	1 October
Bronze	Andy Jameson	Swimming	Men's 100 metre butterfly	21 September
Bronze	Graham Brookhouse; Dominic Mahony; Richard Phelps	Modern pentathlon	Men's team	22 September
Bronze	Virginia Leng	Equestrian	Individual eventing	22 September
Bronze	Andy Holmes; Steven Redgrave; Patrick Sweeney	Rowing	Men's coxed pair	25 September
Bronze	Yvonne Murray	Athletics	Women's 3000 metres	25 September
Bronze	Richie Woodhall	Boxing	Light middleweight	29 September
Bronze	Mark Rowland	Athletics	Men's 3000 metres steeplechase	30 September
Bronze	Dennis Stewart	Judo	Men's 95 kg	30 September
Bronze	Steven Hallard; Richard Priestman; Leroy Watson	Archery	Men's team	1 October

== Competitors ==
The following is the list of number of competitors in the Games.

Sport	Men	Women	Total
Archery	3	3	6
Athletics	57	45	102
Boxing	8	–	8
Canoeing	12	5	17
Cycling	13	4	17
Diving	3	2	5
Equestrian	6	6	12
Fencing	8	5	13
Field hockey	16	16	32
Gymnastics	2	3	5
Judo	7	–	7
Modern pentathlon	3	–	3
Rowing	21	9	30
Sailing	13	2	15
Shooting	6	2	8
Swimming	19	19	38
Synchronized swimming	–	3	3
Table tennis	4	0	4
Tennis	2	2	4
Weightlifting	10	–	10
Wrestling	6	–	6
Total	219	126	345

== Archery ==
In the fifth appearance by Great Britain in modern Olympic archery, the men's team won a bronze medal while Joanne Franks added another top eight finish in the women's individual and the women's team came in 5th.

Women's Individual Competition:

- Joanne Franks – Final (→ 7th place)
- Pauline Edwards – Quarterfinal (→ 17th place)
- Cheryl Sutton – Preliminary Round (→ 51st place)

Men's Individual Competition:

- Leroy Watson – Quarterfinals (→ 18th place)
- Steven Hallard – 1/8 finals (→ 21st place)
- Richard Priestman – Preliminary Round (→ 57th place)

Men's Team Competition:

- Watson, Hallard, and Priestman – Final (→ Bronze Medal)

Women's Team Competition:

- Franks, Edwards, and Sutton – Final (→ 5th place)

== Athletics ==
Men's 100 metres

- Linford Christie
- Barrington Williams
- John Regis

Men's 200 metres

- Linford Christie
- Michael Rosswess
- John Regis

Men's 400 metres

- Brian Whittle
- Todd Bennett

Men's 800 metres

- Peter Elliott
- Steve Cram
- Tom McKean

Men's 1.500 metres

- Peter Elliott
- Steve Cram
- Steve Crabb

Men's 5.000 metres

- Eamonn Martin
- Jack Buckner
- Gary Staines

Men's 10.000 metres

- Eamonn Martin

- First Round — 28:25.46
- Final — did not finish (→ no ranking)

- Steve Binns

- First Round — 28:52.88 (→ did not advance)

Men's Marathon

- Charlie Spedding

- Final — 2"12:19 (→ 6th place)

- Dave Long

- Final — 2"16:18 (→ 21st place)

- Kevin Forster

- Final — 2"20:45 (→ 33rd place)

Men's 400 m Hurdles

- Kriss Akabusi

- Heat — 49.62 (2nd)
- Semi-Final — 49.22 (4th)
- Final — 48.69 (6th)

- Max Robertson

- Heat — 50.67 (5th → did not advance

- Philip Harries

- Heat — 50.81 (5th place → did not advance)

Men's 4 × 400 m Relay

- Brian Whittle, Paul Harmsworth, Todd Bennett, and Philip Brown

- Heat — 3:04.18

- Brian Whittle, Kriss Akabusi, Todd Bennett, and Philip Brown

- Semi Final — 3:04.60
- Final — 3:02.00 (→ 5th place)

Men's 3,000 m Steeplechase

- Mark Rowland

- Heat — 8:31.40
- Semi Final — 8:18.31
- Final — 8:07.96 (→ Bronze Medal)

- Eddie Wedderburn

- Heat — 8:38.90
- Semi Final — 8:28.62 (→ did not advance)

- Roger Hackney

- Heat — 8:39.30
- Semi Final — did not finish (→ did not advance)

Men's Javelin Throw

- David Ottley

- Qualification — 80.98 m
- Final — 76.96 m (→ 11th place)

- Roald Bradstock

- Qualification — 75.96 m (→ did not advance)

- Mick Hill

- Qualification — 77.20 m (→ did not advance)

Men's Discus Throw

- Paul Mardle

- Qualifying Heat – 58.28 m (→ did not advance)

Men's Hammer Throw

- Dave Smith

- Qualifying Heat — 69.12 m (→ did not advance)

- Matthew Mileham

- Qualifying Heat — 62.42 m (→ did not advance)

- Michael Jones

- Qualifying Heat — 70.38 m (→ did not advance)

Men's Shot Put

- Tony Mercer

- Qualifying Heat – 16.28 m (→ did not advance)

- Paul Edwards

- Qualifying Heat – 15.68 m (→ did not advance)

Men's Long Jump

- Mark Forsythe

- Qualification — 7.77 m
- Final — 7.54 m (→ 12th place)

- Stewart Faulkner

- Qualification — 7.74 m (→ did not advance)

- John King

- Qualification — 7.57 m (→ did not advance)

Men's Decathlon

- Daley Thompson — 8306 points (→ 4th place)

- 100 metres — 10.62 s
- Long Jump — 7.38 m
- Shot Put — 15.02 m
- High Jump — 2.03 m
- 400 metres — 49.06 s
- 110 m Hurdles — 14.72 s
- Discus Throw — 44.80 m
- Pole Vault — 4.90 m
- Javelin Throw — 64.04 m
- 1,500 metres — 4:45.11 s

- Alex Kruger — 7623 points (→ 24th place)

- 100 metres — 11.30 s
- Long Jump — 6.97 m
- Shot Put — 12.23 m
- High Jump — 2.15 m
- 400 metres — 49.98 s
- 110 m Hurdles — 15.38 s
- Discus Throw — 38.72 m
- Pole Vault — 4.60 m
- Javelin Throw — 54.34 m
- 1,500 metres — 4:37.84 s

- Greg Richards — 7237 points (→ 30th place)

- 100 metres — 11.50 s
- Long Jump — 7.09 m
- Shot Put — 12.94 m
- High Jump — 1.82 m
- 400 metres — 49.27 s
- 110 m Hurdles — 15.56 s
- Discus Throw — 42.32 m
- Pole Vault — 4.50 m
- Javelin Throw — 53.50 m
- 1,500 metres — 4:53.85 s

Men's 50 km Walk

- Les Morton

- Final — 3'59:30 (→ 27th place)

- Paul Blagg

- Final — 4'00:07 (→ 28th place)

Women's 4 × 400 m Relay

- Linda Keough, Jennifer Stoute, Janet Smith, and Sally Gunnell

- Heat — 3:28.52

- Linda Keough, Jennifer Stoute, Angela Piggford, and Sally Gunnell

- Final — 3:26.89 (→ 6th place)

Women's Marathon

- Angie Pain — 2"30.51 (→ 10th place)
- Susan Tooby — 2"31.33 (→ 12th place)
- Susan Crehan — 2"36.57 (→ 32nd place)

Women's Discus Throw

- Jacqueline McKernan

- Qualification – 50.92 m (→ did not advance)

Women's Javelin Throw

- Fatima Whitbread

- Qualification – 68.44 m
- Final – 70.32 m (→ Silver Medal)

- Tessa Sanderson

- Qualification – 56.70 m (→ did not advance)

- Sharon Gibson

- Qualification – 56.00 m (→ did not advance)

Women's Shot Put

- Yvonne Hanson-Nortey

- Qualification – 15.13 m (→ did not advance)

- Judy Oakes

- Qualification – 18.34 m (→ did not advance)

- Myrtle Augee

- Qualification – 17.31 m (→ did not advance)

Women's Heptathlon

- Kim Hagger

- Final Result — 5975 points (→ 17th place)

- Joanne Mulliner

- Final Result — 5746 points (→ 19th place)

- Judy Simpson

- Final Result — 1951 points (→ 29th place) - (withdrew after two events)

== Boxing ==
Men's Light Flyweight (– 48 kg)

- Mark Epton

- First Round – Defeated Damber Bhatta (Nepal) on points
- Second Round – Lost to Ivailo Marinov (Bulgaria) on points

Men's Flyweight (– 51 kg)

- John Lyon

- First Round — Lost to Ramzan Gul (Turkey), on points (1:4)

Men's Featherweight (– 57 kg)

- Dave Anderson

- First Round – Defeated Domingo Damigella (Argentina) on points
- Second Round – Defeated Paul Fitzgerald (Ireland) on points
- Third Round – Lost to Regilio Tuur (Netherlands) on points

Men's Heavyweight (– 91 kg)

- Henry Akinwande

- First Round – Bye
- Second Round – Lost to Arnold Vanderlyde (Netherlands) on points

== Cycling ==
Seventeen cyclists, thirteen men and four women, represented Great Britain in 1988.

Men's road race

- Neil Hoban
- Paul Curran
- Mark Gornall

Men's team time trial

- Phil Bateman
- Harry Lodge
- Ben Luckwell
- David Spencer

Men's sprint

- Eddie Alexander

Men's individual pursuit

- Colin Sturgess

Men's team pursuit

- Chris Boardman
- Robert Coull
- Simon Lillistone
- Glen Sword

Women's road race

- Maria Blower — 2:00:52 (→ 6th place)
- Sally Hodge — 2:00:52 (→ 9th place)
- Lisa Brambani — 2:00:52 (→ 11th place)

Women's sprint

- Louise Jones

== Diving ==
Men

Athlete	Event	Preliminary		Final	
Athlete	Event	Points	Rank	Points	Rank
Graham Morris	3 m springboard	478.74	26	Did not advance	
Robert Morgan	3 m springboard	457.65	29	Did not advance	
Robert Morgan	10 m platform	489.27	15	Did not advance	
Jeffrey Arbon	10 m platform	450.18	21	Did not advance	

Women

Athlete	Event	Preliminary		Final	
Athlete	Event	Points	Rank	Points	Rank
Carolyn Roscoe	3 m springboard	399.87	18	Did not advance	
Naomi Bishop	3 m springboard	349.44	26	Did not advance	
Carolyn Roscoe	10 m platform	322.35	18	Did not advance	

== Fencing ==
13 fencers, 8 men and 5 women, represented Great Britain in 1988.

Men's foil

- Pierre Harper
- Bill Gosbee
- Donnie McKenzie

Men's team foil

- Tony Bartlett, Jonathan Davis, Bill Gosbee, Pierre Harper, Donnie McKenzie

Men's épée

- John Llewellyn
- Hugh Kernohan

Men's sabre

- Mark Slade

Women's foil

- Liz Thurley
- Fiona McIntosh
- Linda Ann Martin

Women's team foil

- Ann Brannon, Linda Ann Martin, Fiona McIntosh, Linda Strachan, Liz Thurley

== Hockey ==
=== Men's team competition ===
- Preliminary round (group A)

- Great Britain – South Korea 2-2
- Great Britain – Canada 3-0
- Great Britain – West Germany 1-2
- Great Britain – Soviet Union 3-1
- Great Britain – India 3-0

- Semi Finals

- Great Britain – Australia 3-2

- Final

- Great Britain – West Germany 3-1 (→ Gold Medal)

- Team roster

- ( 1.) Ian Taylor (gk)
- ( 2.) Veryan Pappin (gk)
- ( 3.) David Faulkner
- ( 4.) Paul Barber
- ( 5.) Stephen Martin
- ( 6.) Jon Potter
- ( 7.) Richard Dodds
- ( 8.) Martyn Grimley
- ( 9.) Stephen Batchelor
- (10.) Richard Leman
- (11.) Jimmy Kirkwood
- (12.) Kulbir Bhaura
- (13.) Sean Kerly
- (14.) Robert Clift
- (15.) Imran Sherwani
- (16.) Russell Garcia

- Head coach: David Whitaker

=== Women's team competition ===
- Preliminary round (group A)

- Great Britain – Argentina 1-0
- Great Britain – The Netherlands 1-5
- Great Britain – United States 2-2

- Semi Finals

- Great Britain – South Korea 0-1

- Bronze Medal Match

- Great Britain – The Netherlands 1-3 (→ Fourth place)

- Team roster

- Jill Atkins
- Wendy Banks (gk)
- Gill Brown
- Karen Brown
- Mary Nevill
- Julie Cook (gk)
- Vickey Dixon
- Wendy Fraser
- Barbara Hambly (c)
- Caroline Jordan
- Violet McBride
- Moira MacLeod
- Caroline Brewer
- Jane Sixsmith
- Kate Parker
- Alison Ramsay

- Head coach: Dennis Hay

== Modern pentathlon ==
Three male pentathletes represented Great Britain in 1988. They won bronze in the team event.

Men's Individual Competition:

- Richard Phelps – 5229 pts (→ 6th place)
- Dominic Mahony – 5047 pts (→ 16th place)
- Graham Brookhouse – 5000 pts (→ 21st place)

Men's Team Competition:

- Phelps, Mahony, and Brookhouse – 15276 pts (→ Bronze Medal)

== Rowing ==
Men's coxless pair

- Andy Holmes, Steve Redgrave

- (→ Gold Medal)

Men's coxed pair

- Andy Holmes, Steve Redgrave, Patrick Sweeney,

- (→ Bronze Medal)

Men's coxless four

- Simon Berrisford, Mark Buckingham, Peter Mulkerrins, Stephen Peel

- (→ 4th place)

Men's coxed four

- Martin Cross, Adam Clift, John Maxey, John Garrett, Vaughan Thomas

- (→ 4th place)

Eight

- Nicholas Burfitt, Peter Beaumont, Terence Dillon, Anton Obholzer, Simon Jefferies, Salih Hassan, Richard Stanhope, Gavin Stewart, Stephen Turner

- (→ 4th place)

Women's double scull

- Sally Andreae, Alison Gill

- (→ 9th place)

Women's coxless pair

- Alison Bonner, Kim Thomas

- (→ 8th place)

Women's coxed four

- Fiona Johnston, Kate Grose, Joanne Gough, Susan Smith, Alison Norrish

- (→ 6th place)

== Swimming ==
Men's 50 m freestyle

- Mark Foster

- Heat – 23.51 (→ did not advance, 22nd place)

- Mike Fibbens

- Heat – 23.67 (→ did not advance, 25th place)

Men's 100 m freestyle

- Andy Jameson

- Heat – 51.18 (→ did not advance, 21st place)

- Roland Lee

- Heat – 51.20 (→ did not advance, 22nd place)

Men's 200 m freestyle

- Paul Howe

- Heat – 1:51.22
- B-Final – 1:51.99 (→ 16th place)

- Michael Green

- Heat – 1:53.03 (→ did not advance, 27th place)

Men's 400 m freestyle

- Kevin Boyd

- Heat – 3:50.01
- Final – 3:50.16 (→ 7th place)

- Tony Day

- Heat – 3:57.91 (→ did not advance, 24th place)

Men's 1500 m freestyle

- Kevin Boyd

- Heat – 15:17.56
- Final – 15:21.16 (→ 7th place)

- Tony Day

- Heat – 15:38.75 (→ did not advance, 22nd place)

Men's 100 m backstroke

- Neil Harper

- Heat – 58.02 (→ did not advance, 22nd place)

- Neil Cochran

- Heat – 58.25 (→ did not advance, 25th place)

Men's 200 m backstroke

- Gary Binfield

- Heat – 2:03.79
- B-Final – 2:04.90 (→ 16th place)

- John Davey

- Heat – 2:04.70 (→ did not advance, 20th place)

Men's 100 m breaststroke

- Adrian Moorhouse

- Heat – 1:02.19
- Final – 1:02.04 (→ Gold Medal)

- James Parrack

- Heat – 1:04.23 (→ did not advance, 17th place)

Men's 200 m breaststroke

- Nick Gillingham

- Heat – 2:14.58
- Final – 2:14.12 (→ Silver Medal)

- Adrian Moorhouse

- Heat – 2:18.51 (→ 15th place)
- B-Final – scratched (→ did not advance, no ranking)

Men's 100 m butterfly

- Andy Jameson

- Heat – 53.34
- Final – 53.30 (→ Bronze Medal)

- Neil Cochran

- Heat – 54.75
- B-Final – 55.22 (→ 16th place)

Men's 200 m butterfly

- Tim Jones

- Heat – 2:01.01
- B-Final – 2:00.32 (→ 10th place)

- Nick Hodgson

- Heat – 2:01.44
- B-Final – 2:01.09 (→ 12th place)

Men's 200 m individual medley

- John Davey

- Heat – 2:05.55
- B-Final – 2:04.17 (→ 10th place)

- Neil Cochran

- Heat – 2:05.56
- B-Final – 2:05.44 (→ 11th place)

Men's 400 m individual medley

- Paul Brew

- Heat – 4:27.22
- B-Final – 4:26.77 (→ 15th place)

- John Davey

- Heat – DSQ (→ did not advance, no ranking)

Men's 4 × 100 m freestyle relay

- Andy Jameson, Mark Foster, Mike Fibbens, and Roland Lee

- Heat – 3:23.71

- Mike Fibbens, Mark Foster, Roland Lee, and Andy Jameson

- Final – 3:21.71 (→ 7th place)

Men's 4 × 200 m freestyle relay

- Kevin Boyd, Paul Howe, Jonathan Broughton, and Roland Lee

- Heat – 7:29.77 (→ did not advance, 9th place)

Men's 4 × 100 m medley relay

- Neil Harper, Adrian Moorhouse, Andy Jameson, and Mark Foster

- Heat – DSQ (→ did not advance, no ranking)

Women's 50 m freestyle

- Alison Sheppard

- Heat – 27.14 (→ did not advance, 25th place)

- Annabelle Cripps

- Heat – 27.17 (→ did not advance, 27th place)

Women's 100 m freestyle

- Annabelle Cripps

- Heat – 57.81 (→ did not advance, 25th place)

- June Croft

- Heat – 58.19 (→ did not advance, 28th place)

Women's 200 m freestyle

- Ruth Gilfillan

- Heat – 2:02.11
- B-Final – 2:01.66 (→ 10th place)

- June Croft

- Heat – 2:03.63 (→ did not advance, 21st place)

Women's 400 m freestyle

- Ruth Gilfillan

- Heat – 4:16.66 (→ did not advance, 18th place)

- June Croft

- Heat – 4:21.98 (→ did not advance, 27th place)

Women's 800 m freestyle

- Karen Mellor (swimmer)

- Heat – 8:44.64 (→ did not advance, 16th place)

- Tracey Atkin

- Heat – 9:00.04 (→ did not advance, 25th place)

Women's 100 m backstroke

- Kathy Read

- Heat – 1:04.62
- B-Final – 1:04.27 (→ 16th place)

- Sharon Page

- Heat – 1:04.75 (→ did not advance, 18th place)

Women's 200 m backstroke

- Kathy Read

- Heat – 2:17.22
- B-Final – 2:18.20 (→ 12th place)

- Helen Slatter

- Heat – 2:21.66 (→ did not advance, 22nd place)

Women's 100 m breaststroke

- Susannah Brownsdon

- Heat – 1:11.66
- B-Final – 1:11.95 (→ 16th place)

- Margaret Hohmann

- Heat – 1:12.67 (→ did not advance, 20th place)

Women's 200 m breaststroke

- Susannah Brownsdon

- Heat – 2:36.14 (→ 20th place)

- Helen Frank

- Heat – 2:41.12 (→ did not advance, 33rd place)

Women's 100 m butterfly

- Caroline Foot

- Heat – 1:02.76 (→ did not advance, 18th place)

- Annabelle Cripps

- Heat – 1:03.34 (→ did not advance, 21st place)

Women's 200 m butterfly

- Helen Bewley

- Heat – 2:17.10
- B-Final – 2:17.11 (→ 15th place)

- Lynne Wilson

- Heat – 2:17.28
- B-Final – 2:18.66 (→ 16th place)

Women's 200 m individual medley

- Jean Hill

- Heat – 2:17.57
- B-Final – 2:19.20 (→ 11th place)

- Zara Long

- Heat – 2:22.64 (→ did not advance, 23rd place)

Women's 400 m individual medley

- Tracey Atkin

- Heat – 5:01.34
- B-Final – 4:55.92 (→ 24th place)

- Susannah Brownsdon

- Heat – 4:54.66 (→ did not advance, 18th place)

Women's 4 × 100 m freestyle relay

- Annabelle Cripps, June Croft, Linda Donnelly, and Joanna Coull

- Heat – 3:50.84 (→ did not advance, 10th place)

Women's 4 × 100 m medley relay

- Katharine Read, Susannah Brownsdon, Caroline Foot, and Joanna Coull

- Heat – 4:16.18 (→ did not advance, 9th place)

== Synchronized swimming ==
Three synchronized swimmers represented Great Britain in 1988.

Women's solo

- Nicola Shearn
- Lian Goodwin
- Joanne Seeburg

Women's duet

- Nicola Shearn
- Lian Goodwin

== Tennis ==
Women's Singles Competition

- Sara Gomer

- First Round – Defeated Belinda Cordwell (New Zealand) 4-6 7-5 6-2
- Second Round – Lost to Larisa Neiland (Soviet Union) 7-6 6-7 7-9

- Clare Wood

- First Round – Lost to Wendy Turnbull (Australia) 1-6 3-6

== See also ==
- Sally Jones, first woman BBC sports presenter at the Seoul Olympics.
