= Swimming at the 1986 Commonwealth Games – Men's 4 × 100 metre medley relay =

Men's 4 × 100 metre medley relay at the 1986 Commonwealth Games
- Venue: Royal Commonwealth Pool
- Dates: 30 July 1986
- Competitors: 41 from 9 nations
- Winning time: 3:44.00 GR

Medalists
gold medal	Mark Tewksbury; Victor Davis; Tom Ponting; Alex Baumann; Mike West*; Darcy Wallingford*; Claude Lamy*; Sandy Goss*	Canada
silver medal	Neil Harper; Adrian Moorhouse; Andy Jameson; Roland Lee; Nick Gillingham*	England
bronze medal	Carl Wilson; Brett Stocks; Barry Armstrong; Greg Fasala	Australia

The men's 4 × 100 metre medley relay competition of the swimming events at the 1986 Commonwealth Games took place on 30 July.

== Records ==
Prior to the competition, the existing world and championship records were as follows.

World record	United States (USA); Rick Carey; John Moffet; Pablo Morales; Matt Biondi	3:38.28	Tokyo, Japan	18 August 1985
Commonwealth record				
Games record	?	?	?	?

The following records were established during the competition:

Date	Event	Nation	Athletes	Time	Record
30 July 1986	Final	Canada	Mark Tewksbury; Victor Davis; Tom Ponting; Alex Baumann	3:44.00	GR

== Results ==
=== Heats ===
9 teams participated in 2 heats.

Rank	Heat	Lane	Nation	Athletes	Time	Notes
1	1	-	Australia	Carl Wilson; Brett Stocks; Barry Armstrong; Greg Fasala	3:53.67	Q
2	2	-	Canada	Mike West; Darcy Wallingford; Claude Lamy; Sandy Goss	3:54.77	Q
3	1	-	New Zealand	Paul Kingsman; Grant Forbes; Anthony Mosse; Ross Anderson	3:54.84	Q
4	2	-	England	Neil Harper; Nick Gillingham; Andy Jameson; Roland Lee	3:54.90	Q
5	2	-	Scotland	Craig Nelson; Gary Watson; Richard Leishman; Colin Bole	4:02.86	Q
6	1	-	Singapore	David Lim; Jin Teik Oon; Ang Peng Siong; Jin Gee Oon	4:03.02	Q
7	2	-	Hong Kong	Hor Man Yip; Michael Watt; Yi Ming Tsang; Johnny Li	4:05.22	Q
8	1	-	Wales	Ian Rosser; Bruce Perry; Steven Gwynne; Gareth Williams	4:09.56	Q
9	2	-	Swaziland	Yul Du Pont; Chris Stapley; Shan Nissiotis; Trevor Ncala	4:34.43	

=== Final ===
The results of the final are below.

Rank	Lane	Nation	Athletes	Time	Notes
1st place, gold medalist(s)	5	Canada	Mark Tewksbury; Victor Davis; Tom Ponting; Alex Baumann	3:44.00	
2nd place, silver medalist(s)	6	England	Neil Harper; Adrian Moorhouse; Andy Jameson; Roland Lee	3:44.85	
3rd place, bronze medalist(s)	4	Australia	Carl Wilson; Brett Stocks; Barry Armstrong; Greg Fasala	3:45.86	
4	3	New Zealand	Paul Kingsman; Grant Forbes; Anthony Mosse; Ross Anderson	3:48.58	
5	2	Scotland	Craig Nelson; Gary Watson; Richard Leishman; Colin Bole	3:54.05	
6	7	Singapore	David Lim; Jin Teik Oon; Ang Peng Siong; Jin Gee Oon	3:56.99	
7	1	Hong Kong	Hor Man Yip; Michael Watt; Yi Ming Tsang; Johnny Li	4:00.29	
8	8	Wales	Ian Rosser; Bruce Perry; Steven Gwynne; Gareth Williams	4:07.54	
