= Peter Haining =

Peter Haining is the name of:

- Peter Haining (rower) (born 1962), former Scottish World Lightweight Sculling Champion
- Peter Haining (author) (1940–2007), British journalist, author and anthologist
