= University of Birmingham Boat Club =

British rowing club

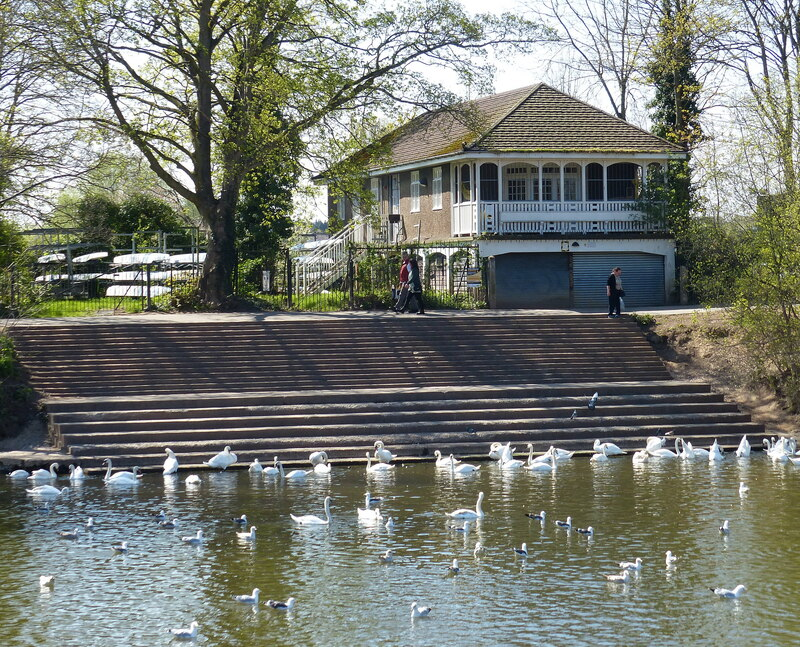

- Location: The Towpath, New Road, Worcester, Worcestershire, England
- Coordinates: 52.189799°N 2.224447°W
- Founded: 1949
- Affiliations: British Rowing (boat code UBI)
- Website: universitybirminghamrowing.com

University of Birmingham Boat Club is a rowing club on the River Severn, based at The Towpath, New Road, Worcester, Worcestershire, England. A second boathouse is also used for the development squad which is shared with Birmingham Rowing Club.

== History ==
The club was founded in 1949 and belongs to the University of Birmingham. The senior squad row out the Worcester boathouse while the development squad row out of the Birmingham Rowing Club boathouse on Edgbaston Reservoir.

Claire Parker represented England at the 1986 Commonwealth Games.

The club produced national champions in 1986, 2009, and 2025.

== Honours ==
=== National champions ===
Year	Winning crew/s
1986	Women 2x
2009	Open Ltw 4x
2025	Open club 2x

=== Henley Women's Regatta ===
Year	Winning crew/s	Time
2025	The Haslam Trophy – for lightweight double sculls (CLwt 2x)	5:43

== Notable members ==
- Claire Parker
- Annie Caddick
- Josh O'Brien
