= Lincoln Asquith =

English sprinter (born 1964)

Personal information
- Nationality: British (English)
- Born: 3 April 1964 (age 62) Birmingham, West Midlands, England

Sport
- Sport: Athletics
- Event: Sprints
- Club: Birchfield Harriers
Medal record
Athletics
Representing England
Commonwealth Games
Silver medal – second place	1986 Edinburgh	4x100m relay

Lincoln G Asquith (born 3 April 1964), is a male former athlete who competed for England.

== Biography ==
Asquith finished third behind Todd Bennett in the 200 metres event at the 1984 AAA Championships. Asquith finished fifth in the 100 metres at the 1985 AAA Championships but was the leading British athlete and therefore considered the British 100 metres champion.

Asquith represented England and won a silver medal in the 4 x 100 metres relay event with Daley Thompson, Mike McFarlane and Clarence Callender, at the 1986 Commonwealth Games in Edinburgh, Scotland.

From 2006 until 2010 he was the escort of the visually impaired athlete Libby Clegg.
