= Rowing at the 1986 Commonwealth Games =

- Venue: Water Sports Centre, Strathclyde Country Park
- Location: Motherwell, Scotland
- Dates: 24 July to 2 August 1986

Rowing at the 1986 Commonwealth Games was the seventh and last appearance of Rowing at the Commonwealth Games.

The sport returned to the Games schedule 24 years after its last appearance in 1962. The rowing programme replaced archery, which made its debut in 1982 but it would be the last time that rowing featured at the Games.

Competition featured 15 events, a large increase on the six held in 1962. The course was the artificial Strathclyde Loch at the Water Sports Centre in Strathclyde Country Park on the outskirts of Motherwell. The Strathclyde Reginal Council spent around £700,000 to bring the course up to international standard.

England topped the rowing medal table by virtue of winning five gold medals.

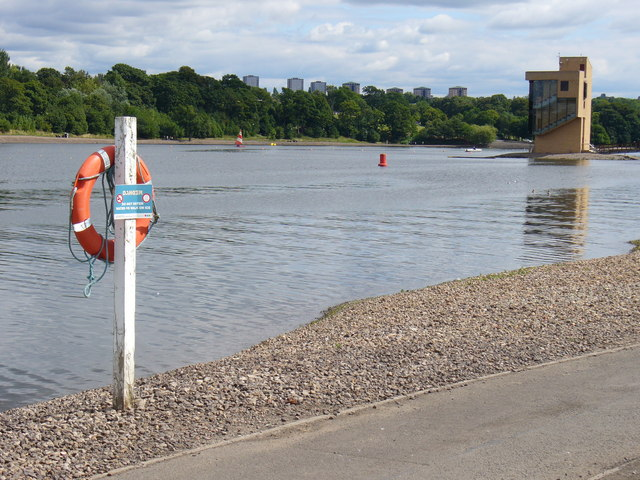
The rowing tower on the finish line was constructed for the 1986 Games

== Medal table ==
* Host nation (Scotland)

Rank	Nation	Gold	Silver	Bronze	Total
1	England	5	3	6	14
2	Australia	4	5	2	11
3	Canada	4	3	4	11
4	New Zealand	2	4	2	8
5	Scotland	0	0	1	1
Totals (5 entries)		15	15	15	45

== Medallists ==
=== Men ===
Event	Gold	Silver	Bronze
Single sculls	England	Australia	New Zealand
Double Sculls	Canada	Australia	England
Coxless pair	England	New Zealand	Scotland
Coxless four	Canada	New Zealand	England
Coxed four	England	New Zealand	Australia
Eights	Australia	England	New Zealand
Lightweight single sculls	Australia	Canada	England
Lightweight coxless four	England	Australia	Canada

=== Women ===
Event	Gold	Silver	Bronze
Single sculls	New Zealand	Canada	England
Double Sculls	New Zealand	Canada	England
Coxless pair	Canada	England	Australia
Coxed four	Canada	Australia	England
Eights	Australia	England	Canada
Lightweight single sculls	Australia	New Zealand	Canada
Lightweight coxless four	England	Australia	Canada

== Men's finals ==
=== Single sculls ===
Pos	Athlete	Time
1	(England) Steve Redgrave	7:28.29
2	(Australia) Richard Powell	7:32.64
3	(New Zealand) Eric Verdonk	7:39.11
4	(Scotland) Phillip Kittermaster	7:45.67
5	(Canada) Mike Hughes	7:49.04
6	(Wales) Chris Howell	7:50.42

=== Double sculls ===
Pos	Athlete	Time
1	(Canada) Bruce Ford, Pat Walter	6:19.43
2	(Australia) Paul Reedy, Brenton Terrell	6:21.17
3	(England) Carl Smith, Allan Whitwell	6:23.53
4	(New Zealand) Dale Maher, Eric Verdonk	6:28.95
5	(Northern Ireland) Patrick Armstrong, John Armstrong	6:33.84
6	(Wales) Lewis Hancock, Robert Luke	6:35.77

=== Coxless pair ===
Pos	Athlete	Time
1	(England) Andy Holmes, Steve Redgrave	6:40.48
2	(New Zealand) Barrie Mabbott, Ian Wright	6:42.63
3	(Scotland) Ewan Pearson, David Riches	6:43.06
4	(Canada) Dave Johnson, Harold Backer	6:46.41
5	(Australia) Glenn Myler, Iain Belot	6:52.34
6	(Wales) Christopher Jones, Philip Gregory	7:00.32

=== Coxless four ===
Pos	Athlete	Time
1	(Canada) Grant Main, Kevin Neufeld, Paul Steele, Pat Turner	6:00.56
2	(New Zealand) Andrew Stevenson, Shane O'Brien, Neil Gibson, Don Symon	6:00.85
3	(England) Graham Faultless, Richard Ireland, Mostyn Field, Humphry Hatton	6:05.99
4	(Australia) Craig Muller, David Doyle, Neil Myers, Jim Battersby	6:09.48
5	(Scotland) Douglas McFarlane, Martin Holmes, Quintin McKellar, William Brown	6:21.26
6	(Northern Ireland) Colin Dickson, Colin Hunter, Domhnall MacAuley, Robert Storrs	6:32.42

=== Coxed four ===
Pos	Athlete	Time
1	(England) Martin Cross, Adam Clift, Andy Holmes, Steve Redgrave, Adrian Ellison (cox)	6:08.13
2	(New Zealand) Nigel Atherfold, Chris White, Greg Johnston, Bruce Holden, Andrew Bird (cox)	6:09.89
3	(Australia) Mark Doyle, James Galloway, Mike McKay, James Tomkins, Dale Caterson (cox)	6:10.57
4	(Canada) Bruce Robertson, Ian McKerlich, John Wallace, Darby Berhout, Tan Barkley (cox)	6:14.66
5	(Scotland) John Bowie, David Nolan, Charles Ivatt, David Ivatt	6:38.15
6	(Wales) Nicholas Hartland, Paul Taylor, Ivor Lloyd, Michael Partridge, Chris Jenkins	6:41.07

=== Eights ===
Pos	Athlete	Time
1	(Australia) James Galloway, Malcolm Batten, Andrew Cooper, Mike McKay, Mark Doyle; James Tomkins, Ion Popa, Steve Evans, Dale Caterson (cox)	5:44.42
2	(England) John Garrett, John Maxey, Jonathan Spencer-Jones, Mark Buckingham, Patrick Broughton; Richard Stanhope, Stephen Peel, Terence Dillon, Vaughan Thomas (cox)	5:46.35
3	(New Zealand) Mike Burrell, Neil Gibson, Barrie Mabbott, Shane O'Brien, Andrew Stevenson; Don Symon, Carl Vincent, Ian Wright, Andy Hay (cox)	5:47.97
4	(Canada) John Ossowski, Eric Kovits, John Houlding, Dave Ross, Andy Crosby; Mark Fortune, Jason Dorland, Don Telfer, Brian McMahon (cox)	5:47.99
5	(Scotland) Charles Ivatt, John Bowie, Archie McConnell, Doug McFarlane, Martin Holmes; Quintin McKellar, William Brown, David Ivatt, Joe Kelly	5:54.50
6	(Wales) Guy Thomas, Iestyn Roberts, Michael Hnatiw, Robin Roberts, Ivor Lloyd; Paul Taylor, Nicholas Hartland, Michael Partridge, Chris Jenkins	6:20.81

=== Lightweight single sculls ===
Pos	Athlete	Time
1	(Australia) Peter Antonie	7:16.43
2	(Canada) Peter Tattersall	7:26.65
3	(England) Carl Smith	7:27.34
4	(Wales) Robin Williams	7:35.95
5	(Northern Ireland) John Armstrong	7:36.64
6	(New Zealand) Dale Maher	7:44.14

=== Lightweight coxless four ===
Pos	Athlete	Time
1	(England) Christopher Bates, Peter Haining, Neil Staite, Stuart Forbes	6:25.86
2	(Australia) Simon Cook, Brian Digby, Merrick Howes, Joseph Joyce	6:27.71
3	(Canada) Dave Henry, Brian Peaker, Bob Thomas, Ryan Tierney	6:35.66
4	(New Zealand) Gary Hay, Martin Eade, Michael Westenra, Simon Koller	6:37.14
5	(Wales) David Kidwell, Stephen Redwood, Jeremy Edwards, Martin Hyndman	6:43.83
6	(Scotland) Tom Baxter, Duncan Warwick, Auster McNaughton, David Nolan	6:52.48

== Women's finals ==
=== Single sculls ===
Pos	Athlete	Time
1	(New Zealand) Stephanie Foster	7:43.22
2	(Canada) Lisa Wright	7:48.90
3	(England) Gillian Bond	7:52.82
4	(Australia) Adair Ferguson	7:56.49
5	(Wales) Rhian Davies	8:21.41

=== Double sculls ===
Pos	Athlete	Time
1	(New Zealand) Stephanie Foster, Robin Clarke	7:21.52
2	(Canada) Heather Clarke, Lisa Robertson	7:39.86
3	(England) Diane Prince, Claire Parker	7:54.71
4	(Scotland) Fiona Nowak, Amanda Towrie	7:56.03

=== Coxless pair ===
Pos	Athlete	Time
1	(Canada) Kathryn Barr, Andrea Schreiner	7:34.51
2	(England) Pauline Bird, Flo Johnston	7:42.23
3	(Australia) Catherine Hall, Alison Smith	7:53.09
4	(Scotland) Fiona Freckleton, Morag Simpson	8:10.47

=== Coxed four ===
Pos	Athlete	Time
1	(Canada) Tina Clarke, Tricia Smith, Lesley Thompson, Jane Tregunno, Jenny Wallinga	6:50.13
2	(Australia) Deborah Bassett, Susan Chapman-Popa, Robyn Grey-Gardner, Marilyn Kidd, Kaylynn Fry (cox)	6:54.31
3	(England) Joanne Gough, Ann Callaway, Kate Holroyd, Trish Reid, Alison Norrish (cox)	7:06.02
4	(Northern Ireland) Angela Darby, Catherine Buchanan, Kathryn Armstrong, Alison Hamilton, Mike Bailey (cox)	7:24.72
5	(Wales) Jo Treweek, Louise Kingsley, Katharine Hartland, Fiona Price	7:27.86
6	(Scotland) Karen Barton, Eleanor McNish, Christine Brown, Patricia McKellar	7:31.54

=== Eights ===
Pos	Athlete	Time
1	(Australia) Annelies Voorthuis, Deborah Bassett, Vicki Spooner, Margot Foster, Marilyn Kidd; Robyn Grey-Gardner, Susan Chapman, Urszula Anne Kay, Kaylynn Fry (cox)	6:43.69
2	(England) Pauline Bird, Alison Bonner, Ann Callaway, Kate Grose, Joanne Gough; Kate Holroyd, Flo Johnston, Trish Reid, Alison Norrish (cox)	6:45.62
3	(Canada) Sandy Coppinger, Gil Saxby, Carla Pace, Cathy Harry, Angie Schneider; Brenda Taylor, Sarah Ogilvy, Cathy Lund, Susan Beck	6:51.81

=== Lightweight single sculls ===
Pos	Athlete	Time
1	(Australia) Adair Ferguson	7:45.49
2	(New Zealand) Philippa Baker	7:45.82
3	(Canada) Heather Hattin	7:52.14
4	(England) Beryl Crockford	7:58.05
5	(Scotland) Carol-Ann Wood	8:06.46
6	(Wales) Rhian Davies	8:18.24

=== Lightweight coxless four ===
Pos	Athlete	Time
1	(England) Alexa Forbes, Gillian Hodges, Lin Clark, Judith Burne	6:54.70
2	(Australia) Deborah Clingeleffer, Amanda Cross, Virginia Lee, Gayle Toogood	6:59.68
3	(Canada) Anne Drost, Marni Hamilton, Marlene van der Horst, Wendy Wiebe	7:01.18
4	(Wales) Jo Treweek, Louise Kingsley, Katharine Hartland, Fiona Price	7:11.70
5	(Scotland) Karen Barton, Eleanor McNish, Christine Brown, Patricia McKellar	7:18.31
6	(Northern Ireland) Angela Darby, Catherine Buchanan, Kathryn Armstrong, Alison Hamilton	7:45.22
