= Neil Staite =

English rower

Personal information
- Born: January 1963 (age 63) Evesham, England
Medal record
Rowing
Representing Great Britain
World Rowing Championships
Silver medal – second place	1986 Nottingham	Lwt coxless four
Silver medal – second place	1987 Copenhagen	Lwt coxless four
Bronze medal – third place	1990 Tasmania	Lwt eight
Representing England
Commonwealth Games
Gold medal – first place	1986 Edinburgh	Ltw coxless four

Neil Anthony Staite (born 1963), is an English former rower who competed for Great Britain and England.

== Rowing career ==
Staite represented Great Britain in six World Championships. He represented England and won a gold medal in the lightweight coxless four, at the 1986 Commonwealth Games in Edinburgh, Scotland.
