= Patricia Reid (rower) =

British rower

Tish Reid
Personal information
- Born: 2 March 1964 (age 62) London, England
- Education: Somerville College, Oxford

Sport
- Sport: Rowing
- Club: Somerville College Boat Club; Rob Roy BC; Lea RC
Medal record
Rowing
Representing England
Commonwealth Games
Silver medal – second place	1986 Edinburgh	eight
Bronze medal – third place	1986 Edinburgh	coxed four

Patricia Josephine Reid (born 2 March 1964) is a British retired rower who competed for Great Britain at the 1992 Summer Olympics.

== Rowing career ==
Reid began rowing in 1984 for the Somerville College, Oxford second eight before progressing to Osiris (the Oxford University second eight) and the Somerville first eight. She was part of the coxed four with Alison Bonner, Sarah Hunter-Jones, Ann Callaway and Lesley Clare (cox), that won the national title rowing for A.R.A squad, at the 1985 National Championships and subsequently went to her first World Championships in Belgium.

In 1986 she was the OUWBC President and rowed in the Oxford first eight and represented England winning a silver medal in the eight and a bronze medal in the coxed four, at the 1986 Commonwealth Games in Edinburgh, Scotland. She was a member of the eight that won the national title rowing for a A.R.A squad at the 1987 National Championships. She won the single sculls national title at the 1990 National Championships.

Reid competed in the women's single sculls event at the 1992 Summer Olympics, finishing in ninth place. She won another single sculls title at the 1995 National Championships.

Reid also represented Great Britain at three more World Championships (1986, 1987 and 1990).

== Personal life ==
She studied at Somerville College, Oxford.
