= Christopher Bates (rower) =

British lightweight rower

Sport
- Sport: Rowing
- Club: NCRA
Medal record
Men's rowing
Representing Great Britain
World Championships
Gold medal – first place	1991 Vienna	Lwt men's four
Gold medal – first place	1992 Montreal	Lwt men's four
Gold medal – first place	1994 Indianapolis	Lwt men's eight
Silver medal – second place	1983 Duisburg	Lwt men's four
Silver medal – second place	1986 Nottingham	Lwt men's four
Silver medal – second place	1987 Copenhagen	Lwt men's four
Silver medal – second place	1995 Tampere	Lwt men's eight
Bronze medal – third place	1984 Montreal	Lwt men's four
Bronze medal – third place	1990 Tasmania	Lwt men's eight
Representing England
Commonwealth Games
Gold medal – first place	1986 Edinburgh	Lwt coxless four

Christopher Bates is a former British lightweight rower.

== Rowing career ==
Bates was three times world champion; twice with the lightweight men's four (in 1991 in Vienna and in 1992 in Montreal) and once with the lightweight men's eight (in 1994 in Indianapolis). He represented England and won a gold medal in the lightweight coxless four, at the 1986 Commonwealth Games in Edinburgh, Scotland.

He was part of the coxless pairs crew, with Peter Haining, that won the national title rowing for Nottinghamshire County Rowing Association, at the 1988 National Rowing Championships.

His daughter Laura, is also an accomplished rower who has recently joined London Rowing Club.
