= Jonathan Spencer-Jones =

British rower (born 1963)

Personal information
- Nationality: English
- Born: 1963 (age 62–63)
Medal record
Rowing
Representing England
Commonwealth Games
Silver medal – second place	1986 Edinburgh	eight

Jonathan 'Joff' Spencer-Jones (born 1963), is a British former rower who competed for Great Britain and England.

== Rowing career ==
Spencer-Jones represented Great Britain in two World Championships. He represented England and won a silver medal in the eight, at the 1986 Commonwealth Games in Edinburgh, Scotland.
