= Simone Hindmarch =

English swimmer (born 1968)

Personal information
- Nationality: English
- Born: April 1968 (age 58)
Medal record
Swimming
Representing England
Commonwealth Games
Gold medal – first place	1986 Edinburgh	medley relay

Simone Denise Hindmarch (née Hindmarch; born 1968), is an English former swimmer. She is also the managing director of Commercial group, along with her brother Arthur Hindmarch who is the chairman of the company, originally set up by their father Michael Hindmarch.

== Swimming career ==
Hindmarch represented England in the 100 and 200 metres backstroke event and won a gold medal in the 4 x 100 metres medley relay, at the 1986 Commonwealth Games in Edinburgh, Scotland.
