= Judith Burne =

British rower

Personal information
- Born: 1962 (age 63–64) Cheltenham, England

Sport
- Club: King James College; University of London BC; Thames Tradesmen's RC; Kingston RC, Upper Thames RC
Medal record
Rowing
Representing England
Commonwealth Games
Gold medal – first place	1986 Edinburgh	Ltw coxless four

Judith L Burne (born 1962), is a British former rower who competed for Great Britain and England.

== Early life ==
She attended the West London Institute of Higher Education, studying PE and Social Biology.

== Rowing career ==
Burne represented Great Britain in three World Championships. She represented England and won a gold medal in the lightweight coxless four, at the 1986 Commonwealth Games in Edinburgh, Scotland.
