= Terry Turner (sport shooter) =

British sports shooter

Sport
- Sport: Sports shooting
Medal record
Representing England
Commonwealth Games
Gold medal – first place	1986 Edinburgh	25m rapid fire pistol pairs

Terry Turner is a British former sports shooter.

== Sports shooting career ==
Turner represented England and won a gold medal in the 25 metres rapid fire pistol pairs with Brian Girling, at the 1986 Commonwealth Games in Edinburgh, Scotland.
