= Claire Parker (rower) =

English rower

Personal information
- Nationality: English

Sport
- Club: Univ of Birmingham BC; Nottinghamshire County RA
Medal record
Rowing
Representing England
Commonwealth Games
Bronze medal – third place	1986 Edinburgh	double sculls

Claire Parker is an English rower.

== Rowing career ==
Parker was part of the double sculls with Diane Prince, that won the national title rowing for a Birmingham University and Pengwern composite, at the 1986 National Championships. This led to her representing England and winning a bronze medal in the doubles sculls with Diana Prince, at the 1986 Commonwealth Games in Edinburgh, Scotland.

She represented Great Britain in the 1989 World Rowing Championships and won the National title with Helen Mangan in both the double sculls and lightweight doubles.

In 1991 she was part of the double scull with Tonia Williams that won the national title rowing for the NCRA at the 1991 National Championships and afterwards she competed in the double sculls with Tonia Williams at the 1991 World Rowing Championships.
