= Carl Smith (rower) =

British rower (1962–2010)

Personal information
- Born: 1962 Nottingham, England
- Died: 1 January 2010 (aged 47–48) Nottingham, England

Sport
- Sport: Rowing
- Club: Nottingham RC
Medal record
Men's rowing
Representing Great Britain
World Championships
Gold medal – first place	1986 Nottingham	Lwt men's double scull
Gold medal – first place	1991 Vienna	Lwt men's four
Gold medal – first place	1992 Montreal	Lwt men's four
Gold medal – first place	1994 Indianapolis	Lwt men's eight
Silver medal – second place	1983 Duisburg	Lwt men's four
Bronze medal – third place	1984 Montreal	Lwt men's four
Bronze medal – third place	1987 Copenhagen	Lwt men's double scull
Bronze medal – third place	1990 Tasmania	Lwt men's eight
Representing England
Commonwealth Games
Bronze medal – third place	1986 Edinburgh	single scull
Bronze medal – third place	1986 Edinburgh	double scull

Carl Smith (1962 – 1 January 2010) was a British lightweight rower.

== Rowing career ==
Smith was a four times World Champion winning a gold medal in 1986, 1991 at the 1991 World Rowing Championships in Vienna with the lightweight men's four, 1992 and 1994.

He represented England and won two bronze medals in the single scull and doubles scull with Allan Whitwell, at the 1986 Commonwealth Games in Edinburgh, Scotland.

== Personal life ==
He went to school at West Bridgford Comprehensive School. He died in 2010 in a car accident.
