= Patrick Broughton =

British rower

Personal information
- Nationality: English
Medal record
Rowing
Representing England
Commonwealth Games
Silver medal – second place	1986 Edinburgh	eight

Patrick Broughton is a British former rower who competed for Great Britain and England.

== Rowing career ==
Broughton represented Great Britain in two World Championships. He represented England and won a silver medal in the eight, at the 1986 Commonwealth Games in Edinburgh, Scotland.
