= Stuart Forbes (rower) =

British former rower

Personal information
- Nationality: English
Medal record
Rowing
Representing England
Commonwealth Games
Gold medal – first place	1986 Edinburgh	Lte coxless four

Stuart Forbes is a British former rower who competed for Great Britain and England.

== Early life ==
He grew up in Newark-on-Trent, the son of rower Brian Forbes, and brother of Alexa Forbes.

== Rowing career ==
Forbes represented Great Britain in World Rowing Cup. He represented England and won a gold medal in the lightweight coxless four, at the 1986 Commonwealth Games in Edinburgh, Scotland.
