= Allan Whitwell =

British rower (born 1954)

Personal information
- Born: 5 May 1954 (age 72) York, Yorkshire, England
- Height: 185 cm (6 ft 1 in)
- Weight: 80 kg (176 lb)

Sport
- Sport: Rowing
- Club: Becket School Boat Club
Medal record
Men's rowing
Representing Great Britain
Olympic Games
Silver medal – second place	1980 Moscow	Eight
World Championships
Gold medal – first place	1986 Nottingham	Ltw double sculls
Bronze medal – third place	1987 Copenhagen	Ltw double sculls
Representing England
Commonwealth Games
Bronze medal – third place	1986 Edinburgh	double sculls

Allan Whitwell (born 5 May 1954, in York) is a British former rower who competed for Great Britain and England.

== Career ==
Whitwell taught at The Becket School when he lived in Mapperley in the 1980s and 1990s.

=== Rowing career ===
Whitwell was a member of the silver medal-winning British men's eight at the 1980 Moscow Olympics. He competed in three Olympic Games in total, appearing in the 1976 Summer Olympics and 1984 Summer Olympics in addition to his medal winning 1980 Games.

In 1977 he was part of the eight that reached the final and finished 5th, at the 1977 World Rowing Championships in Amsterdam. In 1986, he was in the World Championship winning in the lightweight double sculls with Carl Smith. He came third teamed with Smith in the 1987 World Rowing Championships in the same boat class. He represented England and won a bronze medal in the double sculls, at the 1986 Commonwealth Games in Edinburgh, Scotland.

== Personal life ==
Whitwell is currently running an international sculling camp for scullers of any level from novice to international. He also teaches at a school for children with special needs.
