= Tony Supple =

British weightlifter

James Anthony Supple
Personal information
- Full name: James Anthony Supple
- Nickname: Tony
- Nationality: English Irish
- Citizenship: English
- Born: James; 15 December 1961 (age 64) Manchester
- Died: 18th June 2019 Wythenshawe
- Occupation: Master Craftsman
- Years active: 41
- Employer: Self employed
- Height: 5.9”

Sport
- Sport: Weightlifting
- Club: Wythenshawe Forum

Achievements and titles
- Olympic finals: Los Angeles 1984

James Anthony 'Tony' Supple (born 1961), was a former weightlifter who competed for Great Britain and England.

== Weightlifting career ==
Supple represented Great Britain in the 1984 Summer Olympics.

He represented England in the 82.5 kg light-heavyweight division, at the 1986 Commonwealth Games in Edinburgh, Scotland.
