= Joanne Gough =

British rower

Personal information
- Born: 17 November 1964 (age 61) Nantwich, England

Sport
- Sport: Rowing
- Club: Tideway Scullers School
Medal record
Rowing
Representing England
Commonwealth Games
Silver medal – second place	1986 Edinburgh	eight
Bronze medal – third place	1986 Edinburgh	coxed four

Joanne E Gough (born 17 November 1964) is a retired British rower who competed at the 1988 Summer Olympics.

== Rowing career ==
Gough represented England and won a silver medal in the eight and a bronze medal in the coxed four, at the 1986 Commonwealth Games in Edinburgh, Scotland. She was a member of the eight that won the national title rowing for a A.R.A squad at the 1987 National Championships.

She was selected to represent Great Britain in the women's coxed four event at the 1988 Olympic Games in Seoul. The team which consisted of Gough, Kate Grose, Fiona Johnston, Susan Smith and Alison Norrish finished in sixth place.

She was part of the coxless pairs with Annabel Eyres that won the national title rowing for the British squad at the 1990 National Championships.
