= Diane Prince (rower) =

English rower

Personal information
- Nationality: English

Sport
- Club: Pengwern RC
Medal record
Rowing
Representing England
Commonwealth Games
Bronze medal – third place	1986 Edinburgh	double sculls

Diane Prince is an English rower.

== Rowing career ==
Prince was part of the double sculls with Claire Parker, that won the national title rowing for a Birmingham University and Pengwern composite, at the 1986 National Championships. This led to her representing England and winning a bronze medal in the doubles sculls with Claire Parker, at the 1986 Commonwealth Games in Edinburgh, Scotland.
