= Richard Ireland (rower) =

English rower

Personal information
- Nationality: English
Medal record
Rowing
Representing England
Commonwealth Games
Bronze medal – third place	1986 Edinburgh	coxless four

Richard Ireland is a British former rower who competed for Great Britain and England.

== Rowing career ==
Ireland represented Great Britain in two World Championships. He represented England and won a bronze medal in the coxless four, at the 1986 Commonwealth Games in Edinburgh, Scotland.
