= John King (long jumper) =

Personal information
- Nationality: British (English)
- Born: 13 February 1963 (age 62) Chatham, Kent, England
- Height: 183 cm (6 ft 0 in)
- Weight: 72 kg (159 lb)

Sport
- Sport: Athletics
- Event: Long Jump
- Club: Wolverhampton & Bilston AC

John Stewart King (born 13 February 1963) is a male retired English athlete who competed at the 1988 Summer Olympics.

== Biography ==
King was affiliated with Wolverhampton & Bilston AC during his career and competed in the men's long jump event. King finished second on two occasions at the 1986 AAA Championships and the 1989 AAA Championships.

He represented Great Britain at the 1988 Olympics Games in Seoul, South Korea, finishing 23rd place.

He represented England in the long jump event, at the 1986 Commonwealth Games in Edinburgh, Scotland. Four years later he represented England, at the 1990 Commonwealth Games in Auckland, New Zealand.
