= Fiona Johnston =

British rower

Personal information
- Born: 3 February 1966 (age 60) Morpeth, England

Sport
- Sport: Rowing
Medal record
Rowing
Representing England
Commonwealth Games
Silver medal – second place	1986 Edinburgh	coxless pair
Silver medal – second place	1986 Edinburgh	eight

Fiona Johnston (born 3 February 1966) is a British rower. She competed in the women's coxed four event at the 1988 Summer Olympics.

== Rowing career ==
Johnston was part of the coxless pairs crew, with Belinda Holmes that won the national title rowing for a Marlow and Weybridge Ladies composite, at the 1985 National Rowing Championships.

She represented England and won two silver medals in the coxless pair with Pauline Bird and the eight, at the 1986 Commonwealth Games in Edinburgh, Scotland.

In 1988 she was selected for the Great Britain team at the 1988 Olympics. She competed in the women's coxed four with Joanne Gough, Kate Grose, Susan Smith and Alison Norrish finishing in sixth place. Johnston also represented Great Britain at three World Rowing Championships.
