= Alison Childs =

British diver

Personal information
- Born: 13 December 1962 (age 63) Hadleigh, Essex, England

Alison Childs (born 1962), is a former diver who competed for Great Britain and England. Childs represented Great Britain at the 1984 Summer Olympics and represented England in the 3 metres springboard event, at the 1986 Commonwealth Games in Edinburgh, Scotland.

She was a member of the Southend-on-Sea Diving Club.
