= Humphry Hatton =

Personal information
- Born: January 1962 (age 64) Oxford, Oxfordshire, England
Medal record
Rowing
Representing England
Commonwealth Games
Bronze medal – third place	1986 Edinburgh	coxless four

Humphry Douglas Francis Hatton (born 1962) is a former CEO of Deloitte's Corporate Finance businesses in the Middle East and a former rower who competed for Great Britain and England.

== Rowing career ==
Hatton represented Great Britain in the 1986 World Championships. He represented England and won a bronze medal in the coxless four, at the 1986 Commonwealth Games in Edinburgh, Scotland.
