= Mostyn Field =

British rower

Personal information
- Born: 1958 (age 67–68) Surrey, England
Medal record
Rowing
Representing England
Commonwealth Games
Bronze medal – third place	1986 Edinburgh	coxless four

Mostyn Field (born 1958), is a British former rower who competed for Great Britain and England.

== Rowing career ==
Field represented Great Britain in three World Championships. He represented England and won a bronze medal in the coxless four, at the 1986 Commonwealth Games in Edinburgh, Scotland. Field also represented Great Britain in the eight, at under 23 (gold medal) and junior level.

He was part of the coxless pairs crew with G Hill, that won the national title rowing for the University of London Tyrian Alumni Club, at the 1983 National Rowing Championships. The same year he won the Silver Goblets & Nickalls' Challenge Cup with Hill.

Field also rowed for Emanuel School and University of London and won twice more at the Henley Royal Regatta, in the Stewards' Challenge Cup and Thames Challenge Cup.

== Coaching ==
After his own rowing career Field then coached at the University of London with 3 Henley winning crews and 4 crews selected for Great Britain at the Under 23 championships (winning one gold and one bronze).
