= Henderson Pierre =

English high jumper

Personal information
- Born: 1963 (age 62–63) Stepney, London, England

Sport
- Sport: Athletics
Medal record
Athletics
Representing England
Commonwealth Games
Bronze medal – third place	1986 Edinburgh	high jump

Henderson Pierre (born 1963), is an English former athlete.

== Athletics career ==
Pierre represented England in the high jump event, and won a bronze medal at the 1986 Commonwealth Games in Edinburgh, Scotland.
