= Gillian Bond =

British former rower

Gill Bond
Personal information
- Nationality: English
- Born: 1958 (age 67–68) Hackney, London, England

Sport
- Club: Stuart Ladies RC; Lea RC; Imperial College BC; Civil Service Ladies RC
Medal record
Rowing
Representing England
Commonwealth Games
Bronze medal – third place	1986 Edinburgh	single scull

Gillian 'Gill' Bond (born 1958), is a British former rower who competed for Great Britain and England.

== Rowing career ==
Bond was introduced to rowing at the Stuart Ladies by Gill Webb. In 1978 she rowed in the pair with Julia Corbin for England at the Home International. She became part of the British training squad in 1978 and in 1981 gained success with the Lea Rowing Club. After injury in 1982 she switched to the Imperial College Boat Club.

In 1983 she was selected for her first of five World Championships, competing in the 1983 World Rowing Championships in Germany. She was part of the quadruple sculls with Gillian Hodges, Steph Price and Katie Ball, that won the national title rowing for A.R.A squad, at the 1985 National Championships. There were further appearances at the World Championships in 1985 and 1986 and she represented England and won a bronze medal in the single scull, at the 1986 Commonwealth Games in Edinburgh, Scotland.

She rowed in two more World Championships in 1987 and 1988 and just missed out on selection for the 1988 Summer Olympics because of late team changes.
