= Nick Crawshaw =

British sports shooter

Personal information
- Born: 6 November 1963 Nuneaton, Warwickshire, England
- Died: 13 April 2005 (aged 41)

Sport
- Sport: Sports shooting

Nicholas 'Nick' Charles Crawshaw (1963-2005) was a British international sports shooter and the Chief financial officer of the Financial Times.

== Sports shooting career ==
Crawshaw represented England in the fullbore rifle Queens Prize and the fullbore rifle Queens Prize pair, at the 1986 Commonwealth Games in Edinburgh, Scotland.

== Business career ==
He was the Managing Director of the Financial Times’ magazine before becoming the finance director of the Financial Times in 2004.

== Army career ==
He was awarded an Order of the British Empire MBE in the 2000 New Year Honours, for his work in leading the army's career development programme.
