= Nigel Stanton =

British diver (born 1964)

Personal information
- Born: 10 November 1964 (age 61) London, England

Nigel Stanton (born 1964), is a former diver who competed for Great Britain and England.

== Diving career ==
Stanton represented Great Britain at the 1984 Summer Olympics.

He also represented England in both the 3 metres springboard and the 10 metres platform, at the 1982 Commonwealth Games in Brisbane, Queensland, Australia. Four years later he competed again for England in both events, at the 1986 Commonwealth Games in Edinburgh, Scotland.

He was a member of the Beaumont Diving Academy.
