= Loch Lomond Rowing Club =

Scottish rowing club

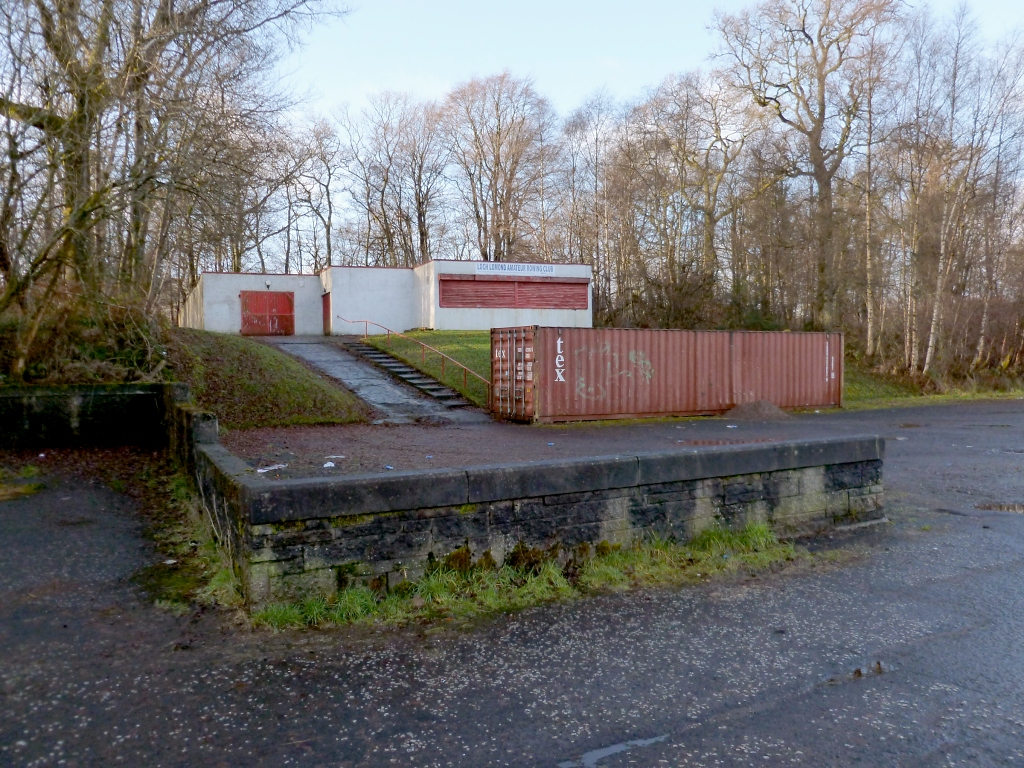

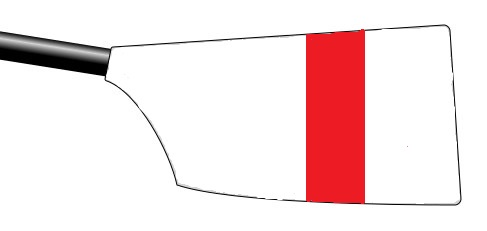
- Location: Heather Avenue, Balloch, Alexandria, West Dunbartonshire, Scotland
- Coordinates: 55.999691°N 4.580007°W
- Founded: 1827
- Affiliations: Scottish Rowing
- Website: www.lochlomondrowingclub.co.uk

Loch Lomond Rowing Club is a rowing club on the River Leven, based at Heather Avenue, Balloch, Alexandria, West Dunbartonshire, Scotland. The club is affiliated to Scottish Rowing.

== History ==
The club was established on Loch Lomond in 1827 and is the oldest rowing club in Scotland. In the early 1970s the clubhouse moved to its present location next to the Angling Club.

Peter Haining learnt to row at the club in the early 1980s.

The club has produced several national champions since 2007.

== Notable members ==
- Peter Haining
- Jim McNiven

== Honours ==
=== National champions ===
Year	Winning crew/s
2007	Women J16 4x
2019	Women J18 4-
