= Richard Stanhope =

British rower

Personal information
- Born: 27 April 1957 (age 69) Blackpool, Lancashire, England

Sport
- Club: Leander Club, Henley-on-Thames; Royal Chester; Liverpool University Boat Club
Medal record
Rowing
Representing Great Britain
Olympic Games
Silver medal – second place	1980 Moscow	Eight
World Rowing Championships
Silver medal – second place	1981 Munich	Eight
Representing England
Commonwealth Games
Silver medal – second place	1986 Edinburgh	Eight

Richard Courtney Stanhope (born 27 April 1957) is a British retired rower.

== Rowing career ==
Stanhope competed in four Olympic Games; the 1980 Summer Olympics, 1984 Summer Olympics, 1988 Summer Olympics and 1992 Summer Olympics. At the 1980 Olympics he was a crew member of the British boat which won the silver medal in the 1980 Olympic eights event. Four years later he and his partner John Beattie finished twelfth in the 1984 coxless pairs competition and at the 1988 Games he finished fourth with the British boat in the men's eight contest. His final Olympic appearance was in 1992 when he was part of the British boat which finished seventh in the coxless four event at the Barcelona Games.

He represented England and won a silver medal in the eight, at the 1986 Commonwealth Games in Edinburgh, Scotland.

== Personal life ==
He married rower Rachel Hirst on Saturday 10 October 1992 at St Lawrence's Church, Flaxton.
