= Mark Buckingham (rower) =

British rower

Personal information
- Born: 10 November 1964 (age 61) Wallsend, England

Sport
- Sport: Rowing
Medal record
Rowing
Representing England
Commonwealth Games
Silver medal – second place	1986 Edinburgh	eight

Mark A H Buckingham (born 10 November 1964) is a British retired rower. Buckingham competed in the men's coxless four event at the 1988 Summer Olympics. He represented England and won a silver medal in the eight, at the 1986 Commonwealth Games in Edinburgh, Scotland.
