= Kevin Boyd =

English swimmer

Kevin Thomas Boyd
Personal information
- Full name: Kevin Thomas Boyd
- Nationality: British
- Born: 23 June 1966 (age 60) Kingston upon Hull, England
- Height: 2.00 m (6 ft 7 in)
- Weight: 93 kg (205 lb; 14.6 st)

Sport
- Sport: Swimming
- Strokes: Freestyle
- Club: Hull Olympic, Borough of South Tyneside
Medal record
Men's swimming
Representing England
Commonwealth Games
Silver medal – second place	1986 Edinburgh	400 m freestyle
Bronze medal – third place	1986 Edinburgh	4×200 m freestyle
Representing Great Britain
Summer Universiade
Bronze medal – third place	1987 Zagreb	400 m freestyle

Kevin Thomas Boyd (born 23 June 1966) is an English former competitive swimmer who represented Great Britain in the Olympics and World University Games, and England in the Commonwealth Games, during the 1980s. He competed internationally in freestyle swimming events.

== Swimming career ==
Boyd attended Hymers College in Hull and, along with elder brother Steven, joined the local swimming club Hull Olympic in 1972. He soon became a proficient swimmer at local and county level in backstroke events, before switching to freestyle in his teens. He joined the Borough of South Tyneside swimming club in 1984 after beginning his degree in medicine at Newcastle University.

He competed in the 400-metre freestyle and the 1500-metre freestyle at the 1988 Summer Olympics in Seoul, South Korea, finishing 7th in both finals. He was a member of the British men's squad that competed in the qualifying heats of the 4×200-metre freestyle relay. In the 1988 Guinness Book of Records he appeared as holding the world record for the 400, 800 and 1500 metres freestyle.

He represented England and won a silver medal in the 400 metres freestyle and a bronze medal in the 4 x 100 metres freestyle relay, at the 1986 Commonwealth Games in Edinburgh, Scotland. Four years later he represented England in the freestyle events, at the 1990 Commonwealth Games in Auckland, New Zealand. He also won the 1986 and 1987 ASA National Championship title in the 400 metres freestyle and the 1987 and 1989 ASA British National 1500 metres freestyle titles.

== Personal life ==
Boyd gave up swimming in 1991 and now works as an orthopaedics specialist and a clinical teacher at University Hospitals Leicester. He is married, and has a daughter and a son.

== See also ==
- List of Commonwealth Games medallists in swimming (men)
