= Peter Haining (rower) =

Scottish rower (born 1962)

Peter Haining MBE OLY
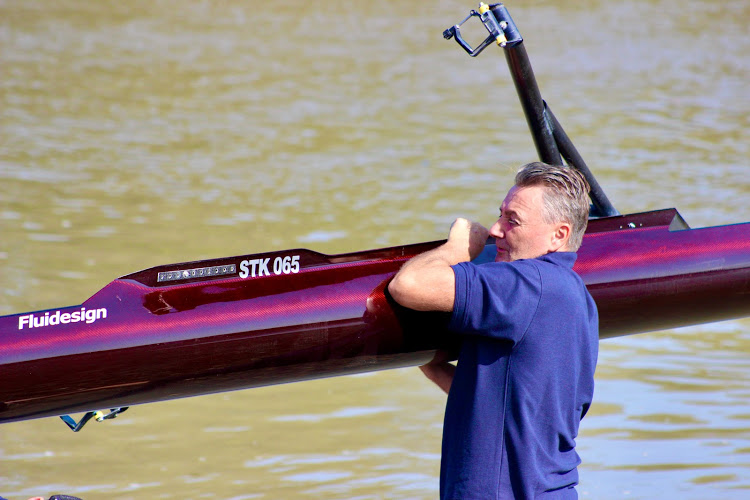
- Peter Haining in September 2020 in Putney, London, trying a Fluidesign boat.

Personal information
- Nationality: Scotland
- Born: 3 April 1962 (age 64) Dumbarton, West Dunbartonshire
- Education: Roehampton University

Sport
- Club: Loch Lomond Rowing Club; NCRA; Auriol Kensington RC
Medal record
Rowing
Representing Great Britain
World Rowing Championships
Gold medal – first place	1993 Račice	Lwt single scull
Gold medal – first place	1994 Indianapolis	Lwt single scull
Gold medal – first place	1995 Tampere	Lwt single scull
Silver medal – second place	1986 Nottingham	Lwt coxless four
Silver medal – second place	1987 Copenhagen	Lwt coxless four
Silver medal – second place	2000 Zagreb	Lwt coxless pair
Bronze medal – third place	1990 Tasmania	Lwt eight
Representing England
Commonwealth Games
Gold medal – first place	1986 Edinburgh	Lwt coxless four six time Gold medalist at Lucern regatta

Peter Moir Haining (born 3 April 1962) is a Scottish-born rower and three-time World Lightweight Sculling Champion who competed for Great Britain and England.

Founding Director of the Scottish institute of sport with Alaister Grey as chairman and seconded to the formation of the English institute of sport. Member of the American and British project. CEO of elite sculling Coastal rowing coach Director of performance for Sons of the Thames Governor of Funtington primary school.

== Biography ==
Haining was born at Dumbarton, Scotland, the son of Jackie and Betty Haining. His father and sister were rowers, and he learnt to row at Loch Lomond Rowing Club. He attended Levenvale Primary School and Vale of Leven Academy and left school to start apprenticeship as painter and decorator and became and outstanding paper hanger and main contractor for the Barbican in London also the first Decorating contractor for IKEA in Brentford London, also worked with the Architects department in Nottinghamshire under Arthur Risdale Robinson however as an international level rowing competitor in the UK at the time was centred on London he went south to join London Rowing Club.

In 1984 he won his first Gold for Great Britain in the lightweight eight in Lucern regatta (European championship)he then went to Nottingham to the National lightweight squad after being impressed by a Nottinghamshire County Rowing Association four at Henley. His first international success came in the 1986 Commonwealth Games, where the GB lightweight four, rowing as England, won gold. Haining would never row for Scotland at the Commonwealth Games even although he won all the qualifying boat classes at Nottingham however no Anglos Scotts were allowed to compete much to the dismay of many. He also won two silver medals at the World Rowing Championships in the lightweight coxless four in 1986 and 1987 and bronze in the lightweight eight in 1990.

He was part of the coxless pairs crew, with Christopher Bates, that won the national title rowing for Nottinghamshire County Rowing Association, at the 1988 National Rowing Championships and was a member of the crew that won the Ladies' Challenge Plate at Henley Royal Regatta in 1989 on a rerow. In 1990 when he was persistently late for training in the eight, his coach pushed him into single sculling.

Although a lightweight rower, Haining competed for Great Britain at the 1992 Summer Olympics in Barcelona, in the unplaced quadruple scull. He was then World Champion in lightweight single sculls in 1993, 1994 and 1995. Rowing for Auriol Kensington Rowing Club, he won the Wingfield Sculls in 1994, 1995, and 1996 and competed in the single scull at the 1996 Summer Olympics in Atlanta, finishing 11th overall, rather than competing in one of the lightweight events introduced at that games.

Haining was runner up to Greg Searle in the Diamond Challenge Sculls at Henley in 1997 and won a silver medal at the World Championships lightweight coxless pairs in 1998. In 2000 he won the Wingfield Sculls again. His last international appearance before retiring was in the GB lightweight eight at the World Rowing Championships in 2002.

In 2005 Haining joined Richard Spratley as coach at Oxford Brookes University Boat Club where he was responsible for training all crews including that winning The Temple Challenge Cup in 2006.

For a period around 2010 Haining coached at Lady Margaret Hall Boat Club.
