= Andy Holmes =

British rower (1959–2010)

Personal information
- Full name: Andrew John Holmes
- Born: 15 October 1959 Uxbridge, Greater London, England
- Died: 24 October 2010 (aged 51) London, England
- Education: Latymer Upper School

Sport
- Sport: Rowing
- Club: Kingston Rowing Club, Leander Club
Medal record
Men's rowing
Representing Great Britain
Olympic Games
Gold medal – first place	1984 Los Angeles	Coxed four
Gold medal – first place	1988 Seoul	Coxless pair
Bronze medal – third place	1988 Seoul	Coxed pair
World Rowing Championships
Gold medal – first place	1986 Nottingham	Coxed pair
Gold medal – first place	1987 Copenhagen	Coxless pair
Silver medal – second place	1987 Copenhagen	Coxed pair
Representing England
Commonwealth Games
Gold medal – first place	1986 Strathclyde	Coxed four
Gold medal – first place	1986 Strathclyde	Coxless pair
- Updated on 10 August 2012

Andrew John Holmes MBE (15 October 1959 – 24 October 2010) was a British rower.

== Biography ==
Holmes was born in Uxbridge, Greater London, and was educated at Latymer Upper School in Hammersmith, west London, where he was coached by Olympic rowing silver medallist Jim Clark. After leaving school, he rowed for Kingston Rowing Club and then Leander Club. At the age of 19, he won the Thames Challenge Cup at Henley Royal Regatta.

He rowed twice in the Olympic Games (in 1984 and 1988) with Sir Steve Redgrave. He was a gold medalist in the men's coxed four in 1984 and in the men's coxless pair in 1988, when he also took bronze in the coxed pair. He also rowed for England in the 1986 Commonwealth Games in Edinburgh, Scotland. winning the coxed four and the coxless pair competitions.,

He retired from rowing in 1990 and severed most contacts with the sport. His daughter only discovered her father's gold medal-winning pedigree when reading about him in a book at school.

He died in London in 2010 after contracting Weil's disease, a severe form of leptospirosis, which results from contact with urine from infected animals or ingesting water contaminated with urine from infected animals.
