= Vaughan Thomas (rowing) =

British coxswain (1964–2022)

Personal information
- Born: 12 June 1964 Bangor, Wales
- Died: December 2022 (aged 58)

Sport
- Sport: Rowing
- Club: Leander Club, Henley-on-Thames
Medal record
Rowing
Representing England
Commonwealth Games
Silver medal – second place	1986 Edinburgh	eight

Hugh 'Vaughan' O Thomas (12 June 1964 – December 2022) was a British rowing coxswain. Thomas competed in the men's coxed four event at the 1988 Summer Olympics.

Despite being Welsh born he represented England and won a silver medal in the eight, at the 1986 Commonwealth Games in Edinburgh, Scotland.
