= Jonathan Broughton =

British swimmer

Personal information
- Born: 1 July 1969 (age 56) Colne, Lancashire, England

Sport
- Sport: Swimming
Medal record
Swimming
Representing England
Commonwealth Games
Bronze medal – third place	1986 Edinburgh	freestyle relay

Jonathan Broughton (born 1 July 1969) is a retired British international swimmer.

== Swimming career ==
Broughton competed in the men's 4 × 200 metre freestyle relay at the 1988 Summer Olympics. He represented England and won a bronze medal in the 4 x 200 metres freestyle relay, at the 1986 Commonwealth Games in Edinburgh, Scotland. Four years later, he represented England in the freestyle events, at the 1990 Commonwealth Games in Auckland, New Zealand. He is also a two times winner of the ASA National Championship title in the 200 metres freestyle (1987 and 1989).
