= Stephen Peel =

British businessman, private equity investor and athlete

Personal information
- Born: Stephen Mark Peel; 29 December 1965 (age 60) Blackburn, Lancashire, England
- Education: King's School, Chester; Downing College, Cambridge
- Occupation: Private equity investor
- Spouse: Yana Peel (m. 1999)
Medal record
Rowing
Representing England
Commonwealth Games
Silver medal – second place	1986 Edinburgh	eight

Stephen Mark Peel (born 29 December 1965) is a British businessman, private equity investor and Olympic athlete.

== Early life ==
Peel was born in Blackburn, Lancashire, on 29 December 1965.

He was educated at King's School, Chester. He has a degree in land economy from Downing College, Cambridge in 1987 and is currently a Wilkins Fellow. In 2015, he completed a Masters of Advanced Studies degree at the Jackson Institute of Global Affairs at Yale University.

== Rowing career ==
Peel started his rowing career at King’s School Chester. He went on to row in the Blue Boat for the three years of his undergraduate degree while studying at the University of Cambridge. Peel served as Cambridge University Boat Club President in 1987.

He rowed in the Great Britain national team from 1985 to 1988. Peel represented Great Britain in coxless fours rowing at the 1988 Olympics in Seoul. He represented England and won a silver medal in the eight, at the 1986 Commonwealth Games in Edinburgh, Scotland.

Peel is the founder of the Infinity Boat Club in Teesside, which was created to help deliver a competitive rowing program to less privileged school children in the area.

In 2025, he was elected as the new Chair of Cambridge University Boat Club. Peel is also part of a group of founding donors that assisted with the establishment of The Cambridge University Boat Club Rowing Charitable Fund.

== Career ==
Peel worked at Goldman Sachs from 1989, founded TPG's European operations in 1997, ran their Russian and Eastern European operations from 2006 and co-headed the Asia operations from 2009 to 2013. In 2014, Peel left TPG Capital.

Peel chairs the board of the Tujenge Africa Foundation, which was founded in 2015.

From 2016 to 2017, Peel served as a visiting fellow of practice at the Blavatnik School of Government at Oxford University.

He is on the advisory council of the Yale Jackson School of Global Affairs at Yale University.

Peel is on the Advisory Board of the Institute for State Effectiveness, which is works on pathways for economic development, peace, and stability within various countries and across different regions in the world.

Until 2014, Peel was a senior partner at the global private equity firm TPG Capital. In 2016, Peel co-founded a new private equity firm, Novalpina Capital, which focused on control-orientated equity investments in European middle market businesses. After a dispute between the three founders, the firm’s investors voted to remove it as fund manager of its private equity fund in 2021. The firm was previously most notable for its majority stake that amounted to 70% in Israeli surveillance technology firm NSO Group, which was acquired in February 2019.

Peel stepped down as a non-executive director at the NGO, Global Witness.

Peel is the founder of SMP Policy Innovation Ltd, a not-for-profit policy organisation aiming to promote, design and assist government policy.

== Personal life ==
He is married to Yana Peel, who is a businesswoman, philanthropist and arts patron, most recently global head of arts and culture at Chanel, and they have two children. They married in 1999, and live in Bayswater, London.
