= Adam Clift =

British rower (born 1962)

Personal information
- Full name: David Adam Clift
- Born: 3 January 1962 (age 64) Littleborough, Greater Manchester, England

Sport
- Sport: Rowing
- Club: Hollingworth Lake Rowing Club; Marlow
Medal record
Rowing
Representing England
Commonwealth Games
Gold medal – first place	1986 Edinburgh	coxed four

David Adam Clift (born 3 January 1962) is a British retired rower.

== Rowing career ==
Clift competed for Great Britain at the 1984 Summer Olympics and the 1988 Summer Olympics. finishing 5th in the 1984 GB Eight and 4th in the 1988 GB coxed Four. He represented England and won a gold medal in the coxed four, at the 1986 Commonwealth Games in Edinburgh, Scotland.

At the 1985 World Rowing Championships he won the Silver Medal in the Coxless pairs event with Martin Cross and coached by Mike Spracklen. The British pair losing in a photo finish to the Pimenov brothers from the Soviet Union by 3/100th of a second. Clift and Cross produced a characteristic and late burst of speed in the last 500m that all but overhauled the Soviet crew on the finish line.

In 1986 Clift and Cross won the Pairs Gold medal at the Lucerne Regatta but after illness eventually placed 4th in a tight field at the ‘86 World Champs in Nottingham.

Clift represented Great Britain at the 1978 ,’79 and ‘80 World Junior Rowing Champs. He started in Rowing as a member of Hollingworth Lake Rowing Club in Lancashire and was coached by youth coach Paul Gooder.

Whilst still a Junior under 18 oarsman he won the Senior Double sculls British title with Steve Redgrave, rowing for the Marlow Rowing Club, at the 1980 National Rowing Championships. This crew also held a course record for over 25 years at Henley Royal Regatta.

Clift won Silver and narrowly missed a Gold medal at the 1980 World Junior Rowing Championships in the Double sculls event with Steve Redgrave. Losing to an East German Double by 0.3 seconds. The German crew contained Thomas Lange, future two times winner of the Olympic single sculls title.

Clift is a winner of the Grand Challenge Cup ‘83 and ‘84 and Queen Mother Cup ‘81 ‘82 at Henley Royal Regatta.

After retirement as an athlete he was Chief Coach at The Leander Club for 3 years.

== Personal life ==
His brother is Olympian Jonathan Clift.
