= England at the 1986 Commonwealth Games =

- CGF code: ENG
- CGA: Commonwealth Games England

in Edinburgh, Scotland
- Medals Ranked 1st: Gold 52 Silver 43 Bronze 49 Total 144

Commonwealth Games appearances (overview)
- 1930; 1934; 1938; 1950; 1954; 1958; 1962; 1966; 1970; 1974; 1978; 1982; 1986; 1990; 1994; 1998; 2002; 2006; 2010; 2014; 2018; 2022; 2026; 2030

England competed at the 1986 Commonwealth Games in Edinburgh, Scotland, between 24 July and 2 August 1986.

England finished topped the medal table with 52 gold medals, 43 silver medals and 49 bronze medals.

== Medal table (top three) ==
Rank	Nation	Gold	Silver	Bronze	Total
1	England	52	43	49	144
2	Canada	51	34	30	115
3	Australia	40	46	35	121
Totals (3 entries)		143	123	114	380

== Medallists ==
Medal	Name	Sport	Event
Gold	Roger Black	Athletics	Men's 400 metres
Gold	Steve Cram	Athletics	Men's 800 metres
Gold	Steve Cram	Athletics	Men's 1500 metres
Gold	Steve Ovett	Athletics	Men's 5000 metres
Gold	Jon Solly	Athletics	Men's 10,000 metres
Gold	Kriss Akabusi; Roger Black; Todd Bennett; Phil Brown	Athletics	Men's 4 × 400 metres relay
Gold	Andy Ashurst	Athletics	Men's pole vault
Gold	John Herbert	Athletics	Men's triple jump
Gold	Billy Cole	Athletics	Men's shot put
Gold	David Smith	Athletics	Men's hammer throw
Gold	David Ottley	Athletics	Men's javelin
Gold	Daley Thompson	Athletics	Men's decathlon
Gold	Heather Oakes	Athletics	Women's 100 metres
Gold	Sally Gunnell	Athletics	Women's 100 metres hurdles
Gold	Paula Dunn; Kathy Cook; Joan Baptiste; Heather Oakes	Athletics	Women's 4 × 100 metres relay
Gold	Joyce Oladapo	Athletics	Women's long jump
Gold	Tessa Sanderson	Athletics	Women's javelin
Gold	Judy Simpson	Athletics	Women's Heptathlon
Gold	Steve Baddeley	Badminton	Men's singles
Gold	Helen Troke	Badminton	Women's singles
Gold	Gillian Clark; Gillian Gowers	Badminton	Women's doubles
Gold	England	Badminton	Mixed team
Gold	Wendy Line	Bowls	Women's singles
Gold	John Lyon	Boxing	Flyweight (51kg)
Gold	Sean Murphy	Boxing	Bantamweight (54kg)
Gold	Darren Dyer	Boxing	Welterweight (67kg)
Gold	Rod Douglas	Boxing	Middleweight (75kg)
Gold	Jim Moran	Boxing	Light heavyweight (81kg)
Gold	Paul Curran	Cycling	Road race
Gold	Paul Curran; Deno Davie; Alan Gornall; Keith Reynolds	Cycling	Team time trial
Gold	Steve Redgrave	Rowing	Men's single sculls
Gold	Andy Holmes; Steve Redgrave	Rowing	Men's coxless pairs
Gold	Martin Cross; Adam Clift; Andy Holmes; Steve Redgrave; Adrian Ellison	Rowing	Men's coxed fours
Gold	Christopher Bates; Peter Haining; Neil Staite; Stuart Forbes	Rowing	Men's lightweight coxless fours
Gold	Alexa Forbes; Gillian Hodges; Lin Clark; Judith Burne	Rowing	Women's lightweight coxless fours
Gold	Bob Northover	Shooting	Open Centre-Fire Pistol
Gold	Brian Girling; Terry Turner	Shooting	Open Rapid-Fire Pistol – Pairs
Gold	Paul Leatherdale; Ian Reid	Shooting	Open Air Pistol – Pairs
Gold	Malcolm Cooper	Shooting	Open Rifle Three Positions
Gold	Malcolm Cooper; Sarah Cooper	Shooting	Open Rifle Three Positions – Pairs
Gold	Ian Peel	Shooting	Open Trap
Gold	Ian Peel; Peter Boden	Shooting	Open Trap – Pairs
Gold	Joe Neville; Ken Harman	Shooting	Open Skeet – Pairs
Gold	Adrian Moorhouse	Swimming	Men's 200 metre breaststroke
Gold	Andy Jameson	Swimming	Men's 100 metre butterfly
Gold	Sarah Hardcastle	Swimming	Women's 400 metre freestyle
Gold	Sarah Hardcastle	Swimming	Women's 800 metre freestyle
Gold	Caroline Cooper	Swimming	Women's 100 metre butterfly
Gold	Simone Hindmarch; Suki Brownsdon; Caroline Cooper; Nicola Fibbens	Swimming	Women's 4×100 metre medley relay
Gold	Dean Willey	Weightlifting	Men's 67.5kg
Gold	Keith Boxell	Weightlifting	Men's 90kg
Gold	Noel Loban	Wrestling	Men's light heavyweight (90kg)
Silver	Linford Christie	Athletics	Men's 100 metres
Silver	Todd Bennett	Athletics	Men's 200 metres
Silver	John Gladwin	Athletics	Men's 1500 metres
Silver	Jack Buckner	Athletics	Men's 5000 metres
Silver	Steve Binns	Athletics	Men's 10,000 metres
Silver	Max Robertson	Athletics	Men's 400 metres hurdles
Silver	Lincoln Asquith; Daley Thompson; Mike McFarlane; Clarence Callender	Athletics	Men's 4 × 100 metres relay
Silver	Fred Salle	Athletics	Men's long jump
Silver	Mike Makin	Athletics	Men's triple jump
Silver	Mick Hill	Athletics	Men's javelin
Silver	Paula Dunn	Athletics	Women's 100 metres
Silver	Kathy Cook	Athletics	Women's 200 metres
Silver	Diane Edwards	Athletics	Women's 800 metres
Silver	Wendy Jeal	Athletics	Women's 100 metres hurdles
Silver	Jane Parry; Linda Keough; Angela Piggford; Kathy Cook	Athletics	Women's 4 × 400 metres relay
Silver	Mary Berkeley	Athletics	Women's long jump
Silver	Judy Oakes	Athletics	Women's shot put
Silver	Fatima Whitbread	Athletics	Women's javelin
Silver	Fiona Elliot	Badminton	Women's singles
Silver	Andy Goode; Nigel Tier	Badminton	Men's doubles
Silver	Andy Goode; Fiona Elliott	Badminton	Mixed doubles
Silver	Mark Epton	Boxing	Light flyweight (48kg)
Silver	Peter English	Boxing	Featherweight (57kg)
Silver	Colin Sturgess	Cycling	Individual pursuit
Silver	Jonathan Spencer-Jones; Patrick Broughton; John Garrett; John Maxey; Terence Dillon; Mark Buckingham; Stephen Peel; Richard Stanhope; Vaughan Thomas	Rowing	Men's eights
Silver	Pauline Bird; Flo Johnston	Rowing	Women's coxless pairs
Silver	Flo Johnston; Pauline Bird; Kate Grose; Alison Bonner; Kate Holroyd; Ann Callaway; Joanne Gough; Trish Reid; Alison Norrish	Rowing	Women's eights
Silver	Richard Wang; Paul Leatherdale	Shooting	Open Free Pistol – Pairs
Silver	Bob Northover; Michael Cutler	Shooting	Open Centre-Fire Pistol – Pairs
Silver	Peter Boden	Shooting	Open Trap
Silver	Joe Neville	Shooting	Open Skeet
Silver	Kevin Boyd	Swimming	Men's 400 metre freestyle
Silver	Adrian Moorhouse	Swimming	Men's 100 metre breaststroke
Silver	Neil Harper; Nick Gillingham; Andy Jameson; Roland Lee	Swimming	Men's 4x100 metre medlay relay
Silver	Kathy Read	Swimming	Women's 200 metre backstroke
Silver	Caroline Foot	Swimming	Women's 100 metre butterfly
Silver	Caroline Cooper; Nicola Fibbens; Zara Long; Annabelle Cripps	Swimming	Women's 4x100 metre freestyle relay
Silver	Annabelle Cripps; Sarah Hardcastle; Karen Mellor; Zara Long	Swimming	Women's 4x200 metre freestyle relay
Silver	Amanda Dodd	Synchronised swimming	Women's synchronised solo
Silver	Amanda Dodd; Nicola Shearn	Synchronised swimming	Women's synchronised duet
Silver	David Mercer	Weightlifting	Men's 90kg
Silver	Duncan Dawkins	Weightlifting	Men's 100kg
Silver	Duncan Burns	Wrestling	Men's light flyweight (48kg)
Bronze	Mike McFarlane	Athletics	Men's 100 metres
Bronze	Phil Brown	Athletics	Men's 800 metres
Bronze	Peter Elliott	Athletics	Men's 100 metre freestyle
Bronze	Tim Hutchings	Athletics	Men's 5000 metres
Bronze	Colin Reitz	Athletics	Men's 3000 metres steeplechase
Bronze	Ian McCombie	Athletics	Men's 30 kilometres walk
Bronze	Henderson Pierre	Athletics	Men's high jump
Bronze	Kathy Cook	Athletics	Women's 400 metres
Bronze	Lorraine Baker	Athletics	Women's 800 metres
Bronze	Myrtle Augee	Athletics	Women's long jump
Bronze	Karen Pugh	Athletics	Women's discus throw
Bronze	Kim Hagger	Athletics	Women's Heptathlon
Bronze	Nick Yates	Badminton	Men's singles
Bronze	Gillian Clark	Badminton	Women's singles
Bronze	Helen Troke; Fiona Elliott	Badminton	Women's doubles
Bronze	Chris Ward; David Ward	Bowls	Men's pairs
Bronze	Betty Stubbings; Jean Valls	Bowls	Women's pairs
Bronze	Barbara Fuller; Brenda Atherton; Madge Allan; Mary Price	Bowls	Women's fours
Bronze	Joey Jacobs	Boxing	Lightweight (60kg)
Bronze	Eric Cardouza	Boxing	Heavyweight (91kg)
Bronze	James Oyebola	Boxing	Super Heavyweight (>91kg)
Bronze	Chris Boardman; Gary Coltman; Rob Muzio; Jon Walshaw	Cycling	Team pursuit
Bronze	Carl Smith; Allan Whitwell	Rowing	Men's double sculls
Bronze	Graham Faultless; Richard Ireland; Mostyn Field; Humphry Hatton	Rowing	Men's coxless fours
Bronze	Carl Smith	Rowing	Men's lightweight single sculls
Bronze	Gillian Bond	Rowing	Women's single sculls
Bronze	Diane Prince; Claire Parker	Rowing	Women's double sculls
Bronze	Joanne Gough; Ann Callaway; Kate Holroyd; Trish Reid; Alison Norrish	Rowing	Women's coxed fours
Bronze	John Bloomfield	Shooting	Open Full Bore Rifle
Bronze	Malcolm Cooper	Shooting	Open Air Rifle
Bronze	Malcolm Cooper; Robert Smith	Shooting	Open Air Rifle – Pairs
Bronze	Andy Jameson	Swimming	Men's 100 metre freestyle
Bronze	Nick Gillingham	Swimming	Men's 200 metre breaststroke
Bronze	Nick Hodgson	Swimming	Men's 200 metre butterfly
Bronze	Stephen Poulter	Swimming	Men's 400 metre Individual Medley
Bronze	Andy Jameson; Mark Foster; Geoffrey Stewart; Roland Lee	Swimming	Men's 4x100 metre freestyle relay
Bronze	Kevin Boyd; John Davey; Paul Howe; Jonathan Broughton	Swimming	Men's 4x200 metre freestyle relay
Bronze	Nicola Fibbens	Swimming	Women's 100 metre freestyle
Bronze	Samantha Purvis	Swimming	Women's 100 metre butterfly
Bronze	Sarah Hardcastle	Swimming	Women's 400 metre individual medley
Bronze	Peter May	Weightlifting	Men's 82.5kg
Bronze	Andrew Saxton	Swimming	Men's 100kg
Bronze	Nigel Donohue	Wrestling	Men's flyweight (52kg)
Bronze	Brian Aspen	Wrestling	Men's bantamweight (57kg)
Bronze	Steve Cooper	Wrestling	Men's lightweight (68kg)
Bronze	Fitzlloyd Walker	Wrestling	Men's welterweight (74kg)
Bronze	Tony Bull	Wrestling	Men's middleweight (82kg)
Bronze	David Kilpin	Wrestling	Men's heavyweight (100kg)
Bronze	Keith Peache	Wrestling	Men's super heavyweight (100kg)

Medals by sport
Sport	Gold medal	Silver medal	Bronze medal	Total
Athletics	18	18	12	48
Shooting	8	4	3	15
Swimming	6	7	9	22
Rowing	5	3	6	14
Boxing	5	2	3	10
Badminton	4	3	3	10
Weightlifting	2	2	2	6
Cycling	2	1	1	4
Wrestling	1	1	7	9
Lawn bowls	1	0	3	4
Synchronised swimming	0	2	0	2
Total	52	43	49	144

Medals by gender
Gender	Gold medal	Silver medal	Bronze medal	Total
Male	29	21	32	82
Female	13	17	13	45
Mixed / open	9	5	3	17
Total	52	43	49	144

== Aquatics ==
=== Diving ===
Men

Athlete	Event	Final	
Athlete	Event	Points	Rank
Nigel Stanton	Springboard	577.26	8
Jeffrey Arbon	Springboard	522.09	10
James Roose	Springboard	505.98	11
Nigel Stanton	Highboard	545.64	6
Jeffrey Arbon	Highboard	479.82	9
James Roose	Highboard	449.85	10

Women

Athlete	Event	Final	
Athlete	Event	Points	Rank
Alison Childs	Springboard	426.57	8
Lisa Brace	Springboard	414.36	9
Carolyn Roscoe	Springboard	387.21	10
Rachel Spinks	Highboard	395.43	4
Carolyn Roscoe	Highboard	357.15	7
Lisa Brace	Highboard	335.55	9

=== Swimming ===
Men

Athlete	Event	Heat		Final	
Athlete	Event	Time	Rank	Time	Rank
Roland Lee	100 metre freestyle	51.93	2 Q	51.47	5
Andy Jameson	100 metre freestyle	51.44	1 Q	51.21	(bronze)
Mark Foster	100 metre freestyle	52.18	3	did not advance	
Jonathan Broughton	200 metre freestyle	1:53.83	2	did not advance	
Paul Howe	200 metre freestyle	1:53.45	2 Q	1:54.55	8
Kevin Boyd	200 metre freestyle	1:53.71	3 Q	1:52.75	6
David Stacey	400 metre freestyle	4:04.56	4	did not advance	
John Davey	400 metre freestyle	3:57.65	2 Q	3:57.55	5
Kevin Boyd	400 metre freestyle	3:55.48	1 Q	3:55.00	(silver)
Stephen Willis	1500 metre freestyle	16:00.79	4	did not advance	
David Stacey	1500 metre freestyle	15:57.05	5	15:48.02	8
Gary Donovan	1500 metre freestyle	16:13.28	6	did not advance	
John Davey	100 metre backstroke	59.60	5	did not advance	
Gary Binfield	100 metre backstroke	59.23	4	did not advance	
Neil Harper	100 metre backstroke	58.28	3 Q	58.62	6
Gary Binfield	200 metre backstroke	2:05.56	1 Q	2:04.54	4
Patrick Blake	200 metre backstroke	2:06.72	2	did not advance	
Kevin Boyd	200 metre backstroke	2:07.53	4	did not advance	
Nick Gillingham	100 metre breaststroke	1:06.14	2	did not advance	
Paul Shackley	100 metre breaststroke	1:06.60	3	did not advance	
Adrian Moorhouse	100 metre breaststroke	1:03.21	1 Q	1:03.09	(silver)
Murray Buswell	200 metre breaststroke	2:22.59	1 Q	2:21.48	7
Adrian Moorhouse	200 metre breaststroke	2:18.57	1 Q	2:16.35	(gold)
Nick Gillingham	200 metre breaststroke	2:21.60	2 Q	2:20.46	(bronze)
Nick Hodgson	100 metre butterfly	56.15	2 Q	56.28	8
Roland Lee	100 metre butterfly	58.44	4	did not advance	
Andy Jameson	100 metre butterfly	54.09	1 Q	54.07	(gold)
Nick Hodgson	200 metre butterfly	2:01.70	1 Q	2:00.50	(bronze)
Steve Poulter	200 metre butterfly	2:02.83	2 Q	2:02.24	7
Tim Jones	200 metre butterfly	2:04.75	4	did not advance	
Duncan Rolley	200 metre individual medley	2:08.90	3	did not advance	
Gary Binfield	200 metre individual medley	2:06.51	2 Q	2:06.57	6
John Davey	200 metre individual medley	2:06.87	2 Q	2:05.67	4
Steve Poulter	400 metre Individual Medley	4:28.96	1 Q	4:24.71	(bronze)
Gary Binfield	400 metre Individual Medley	4:32.04	3 Q	4:27.03	4
John Davey	400 metre Individual Medley	4:29.63	2 Q	4:29.51	6
Andy Jameson; Mark Foster; Geoffrey Stewart; Roland Lee	4x100 metre freestyle relay	—N/a		3:25.01	(bronze)
Kevin Boyd; John Davey; Paul Howe; Jonathan Broughton	4x200 metre freestyle relay	—N/a		7:33.39	(bronze)
Neil Harper; Nick Gillingham; Andy Jameson; Roland Lee	4x100 metre medlay relay	3:54.90	2 Q	3:44.85	(silver)

Women

Athlete	Event	Heat		Final	
Athlete	Event	Time	Rank	Time	Rank
Nicola Fibbens	100 metre freestyle	57.56	1 Q	57.66	(bronze)
Annabelle Cripps	100 metre freestyle	58.59	2 Q	58.59	5
Debra Gore	100 metre freestyle	59.83	3	did not advance	
Annabelle Cripps	200 metre freestyle	—N/a		2:04.19	5
Zara Long	200 metre freestyle	—N/a		2:05.23	8
Annabelle Cripps	400 metre freestyle	4:19.18	3 Q	4:19.05	6
Karen Mellor	400 metre freestyle	4:23.44	5	did not advance	
Sarah Hardcastle	400 metre freestyle	4:15.92	1 Q	4:07.68	(gold)
Karen Mellor	800 metre freestyle	8:44.58	1 Q	8:44.15	4
Sarah Hardcastle	800 metre freestyle	8:46.03	1 Q	8:24.77	(gold)
Gaynor Stanley	800 metre freestyle	8:56.74	5 Q	8:54.19	7
Kathy Read	100 metre backstroke	1:05.32	2 Q	1:04.88	5
Catherine White	100 metre backstroke	1:06.23	4	did not advance	
Simone Hindmarch	100 metre backstroke	1:05.21	2 Q	1:04.62	4
Catherine White	200 metre backstroke	2:21.14	2 Q	2:19.96	7
Simone Hindmarch	200 metre backstroke	2:23.42	4	did not advance	
Kathy Read	200 metre backstroke	2:15.85	1 Q	2:16.92	(silver)
Suki Brownsdon	100 metre breaststroke	1:13.78	1 Q	1:12.30	4
Joanne Wood	100 metre breaststroke	1:14.04	2 Q	1:14.15	7
Lorraine Burt	100 metre breaststroke	1:14.14	4	did not advance	
Gaynor Stanley	200 metre breaststroke	2:38.40	3 Q	2:37.73	7
Suki Brownsdon	200 metre breaststroke	2:38.88	2 Q	2:35.98	5
Nina Herbert	200 metre breaststroke	2:39.13	3 Q	2:39.11	8
Caroline Foot	100 metre butterfly	1:02.50	1 Q	1:02.30	(silver)
Samantha Purvis	100 metre butterfly	1:02.22	1 Q	1:02.49	(bronze)
Caroline Cooper	100 metre butterfly	1:03.01	2 Q	1:02.12	(gold)
Helen Bewley	200 metre butterfly	2:16.69	2 Q	2:17.44	7
Samantha Purvis	200 metre butterfly	2:15.03	2 Q	2:14.60	4
Myra O'Fee	200 metre butterfly	2:16.11	3 Q	2:16.50	6
Samantha Purvis	200 metre individual medley	2:22.84	4	did not advance	
Zara Long	200 metre individual medley	2:23.55	5	did not advance	
Joanne Wood	200 metre individual medley	2:24.44	7	did not advance	
Kathy Read	400 metre individual medley	5:00.84	4 Q	4:48.91	8
Sarah Hardcastle	400 metre individual medley	4:50.02	1 Q	4:50.52	(bronze)
Gaynor Stanley	400 metre individual medley	4:57.02	4 Q	4:56.76	7
Caroline Cooper; Nicola Fibbens; Zara Long; Annabelle Cripps	4x100 metre freestyle relay	—N/a		3:49.65	(silver)
Annabelle Cripps; Sarah Hardcastle; Karen Mellor; Zara Long	4x200 metre freestyle relay	—N/a		8:13.70	(silver)
Simone Hindmarch; Suki Brownsdon; Caroline Cooper; Nicola Fibbens	4×100 metre medley relay	—N/a		4:13.48	(gold)

=== Synchronised swimming ===
Athlete	Event	Final	
Athlete	Event	Time	Rank
Amanda Dodd	Synchronised solo	188.05	(silver)
Amanda Dodd; Nicola Shearn	Synchronised duet	185.59	(silver)

== Athletics ==
Men
Track and road

Athlete	Event	Heat		Semifinal		Final	
Athlete	Event	Time	Rank	Time	Rank	Time	Rank
Linford Christie	100 metres	10.32	1 Q	10.29	1 Q	10.28	(silver)
Mike McFarlane	100 metres	10.38	3 Q	10.29	2 Q	10.35	(bronze)
Clarence Callender	100 metres	10.49	2 Q	10.32	4 Q	10.42	6
John Regis	200 metres	21.26	3 Q	21.23	2 Q	21.08	8
Todd Bennett	200 metres	20.83	1 Q	20.86	2 Q	20.54	(silver)
Roger Black	400 metres	46.66	1 Q	47.27	3 Q	45.57	(gold)
Kriss Akabusi	400 metres	46.84	2 Q	47.55	1 Q	46.83	4
Phil Brown	400 metres	46.78	2 Q	47.42	3 Q	46.80	(bronze)
Peter Elliott	800 metres	1:49.73	2 Q	1:47.42	1 Q	1:45.42	(bronze)
Sebastian Coe	800 metres	1:53.13	1 Q	1:48.07	3 Q	DNS	
Steve Cram	800 metres	1:51.42	2 Q	1:48.71	1 Q	1:43.22	(gold)
Steve Cram	1500 metres	—N/a		3:43.98	1 Q	3:50.87	(gold)
John Gladwin	1500 metres	—N/a		3:44.45	2 Q	3:52.17	(silver)
Rob Harrison	1500 metres	—N/a		3:43.69	1 Q	3:54.44	4
Steve Ovett	5000 metres	—N/a				13:24.11	(gold)
Jack Buckner	5000 metres	—N/a				13:25.87	(silver)
Tim Hutchings	5000 metres	—N/a				13:26.84	(bronze)
Jon Solly	10,000 metres	—N/a				27:57.42	(gold)
Steve Binns	10,000 metres	—N/a				27:58.01	(silver)
Mike McLeod	10,000 metres	—N/a				29:57.23	10
Wilbert Greaves	110 metres hurdle	—N/a		13.80	3 Q	13.76	6
David Nelson	110 metres hurdle	—N/a		14.13	4 Q	13.97	7
Jon Ridgeon	110 metres hurdle	—N/a		13.88	4 Q	13.76	5
Gary Oakes	400 metres hurdles	—N/a		53.02	3 Q	50.82	6
Max Robertson	400 metres hurdles	—N/a		52.26	2 Q	49.77	(silver)
Mark Holtom	400 metres hurdles	—N/a		53.11	5 q	50.58	5
Colin Reitz	3000 metres steeplechase	—N/a				8:26.14	(bronze)
Nicholas Ronald Peach	3000 metres steeplechase	—N/a				8:37.64	5
Eddie Wedderburn	3000 metres steeplechase	—N/a				8:46.42	8
Lincoln Asquith; Daley Thompson; Mike McFarlane; Clarence Callender	4 × 100 metres relay	—N/a				39.19	(silver)
Kriss Akabusi; Roger Black; Todd Bennett; Phil Brown	4 × 400 metres relay	—N/a				3:07.19	(gold)
Philip O'Brien	Marathon	—N/a				2:14.54	6
Kevin Forster	Marathon	—N/a				2:16.36	8
Charlie Spedding	Marathon	—N/a				DNF	
Ian McCombie	30 kilometres walk	—N/a				2:10.36	(bronze)
Chris Maddocks	30 kilometres walk	—N/a				2:12.42	4
Martin Rush	30 kilometres walk	—N/a				2:16.01	7

Field

Athlete	Event	Final	
Athlete	Event	Result	Rank
Henderson Pierre	High jump	2.14	(bronze)
Dalton Grant	High jump	2.10	7
Fayyaz Ahmed	High jump	2.10	8
Andy Ashurst	Pole vault	5.30	(gold)
Brian Hooper	Pole vault	5.00	5
Daley Thompson	Pole vault	4.90	6
Fred Salle	Long jump	7.83	(silver)
John King	Long jump	7.70	4
Derrick Brown	Long jump	7.65	5
John Herbert	Triple jump	17.27	(gold)
Mike Makin	Triple jump	16.87	(silver)
Aston Moore	Triple jump	16.07	5
Billy Cole	Shot put	18.16	(gold)
Graham Savory	Shot put	17.31	4
Andy Vince	Shot put	16.68	10
Paul Mardle	Discus throw	56.90	4
Graham Savory	Discus throw	56.42	5
Richard Slaney	Discus throw	56.00	6
David Smith	Hammer throw	74.06	(gold)
Mick Jones	Hammer throw	70.10	4
Matthew Mileham	Hammer throw	67.96	6
David Ottley	Javelin	80.62	(gold)
Mick Hill	Javelin	78.56	(silver)
Daryl Brand	Javelin	72.70	4

Combined events – Decathlon

Athlete	Event	100 m	LJ	SP	HJ	400 m	110H	DT	PV	JT	1500 m	Final	Rank
Greg Richards	Result	11.43	6.85	12.92	1.87	50.23	15.00	42.72	4.60	50.02	4:48.04	7278	9
Greg Richards	Points	767	778	662	687	804	850	720	790	589	631	7278	9
Daley Thompson	Result	10.37	7.70	15.01	2.08	47.30	14.22	43.72	5.10	60.82	4:39.63	8663	(gold)
Daley Thompson	Points	1006	985	790	878	943	946	741	941	750	683	8663	(gold)
Eugene Gilkes	Result	10.65	7.06	14.62	1.99	disq.	15.20	44.54	4.40	withdrew		—N/a	
Eugene Gilkes	Points	940	828	766	794	disq.	825	757	731	withdrew		—N/a	

Women
Track and road

Athlete	Event	Semifinal		Final	
Athlete	Event	Time	Rank	Time	Rank
Paula Dunn	100 metres	11.14	1 Q	11.21	(silver)
Pippa Windle	100 metres	11.52	3 Q	11.68	7
Heather Oakes	100 metres	11.22	1 Q	11.20	(gold)
Kathy Cook	200 metres	23.30	1 Q	23.18	(silver)
Jennifer Stoute	200 metres	23.39	2 Q	DNF	
Simmone Jacobs	200 metres	23.63	3 Q	23.48	4
Kathy Cook	400 metres	53.69	2 Q	51.88	(bronze)
Helen Barnett	400 metres	54.29	4	did not advance	
Angela Piggford	400 metres	54.18	5 q	53.97	8
Lorraine Baker	800 metres	2:03.24	2 Q	2:01.79	(bronze)
Diane Edwards	800 metres	2:04.33	2 Q	2:01.12	(silver)
Helen Thorpe	800 metres	2:05.61	5	did not advance	
Gillian Dainty	1500 metres	4:28.04	5	did not advance	
Christina Boxer	1500 metres	4:12.32	2 Q	4:12.84	4
Suzanne Morley	1500 metres	4:18.89	6 q	4:26.96	10
Christine Benning	3000 metres	—N/a		9:03.45	4
Jane Shields	3000 metres	—N/a		9:13.65	7
Wendy Sly	3000 metres	—N/a		9:14.04	8
Marina Samy	10,000 metres	—N/a		33:10.94	7
Debbie Peel	10,000 metres	—N/a		36:03.79	11
Jill Clarke	10,000 metres	—N/a		DNF	
Wendy Jeal	100 metres hurdles	13.33	1 Q	13.41	(silver)
Lesley-Ann Skeete	100 metres hurdles	13.51	4 q	13.66	5
Sally Gunnell	100 metres hurdles	13.12	1 Q	13.29	(gold)
Aileen Mills	400 metres hurdles	58.65	3 Q	58.01	6
Simone Gandy	400 metres hurdles	1:00.36	5	did not advance	
Yvette Wray	400 metres hurdles	58.60	2 Q	57.59	5
Paula Dunn; Kathy Cook; Joan Baptiste; Heather Oakes	4 × 100 metres relay	—N/a		43.39	(gold)
Jane Parry; Linda Keough; Angela Piggford; Kathy Cook	4 × 400 metres relay	—N/a		3:32.82	(silver)
Angie Pain	Marathon	—N/a		2:37.57	6
Glynis Penny	Marathon	—N/a		2:38.47	7
Julia Gates	Marathon	—N/a		DNF	

Field

Athlete	Event	Final	
Athlete	Event	Result	Rank
Diana Davies	High jump	1.90	4
Jennifer Little	High jump	1.83	8
Louise Manning	High jump	1.75	11
Joyce Oladapo	Long jump	6.43	(gold)
Mary Berkeley	Long jump	6.40	(silver)
Kim Hagger	Long jump	6.34	4
Judy Oakes	Shot put	18.75	(silver)
Myrtle Augee	Shot put	17.52	(bronze)
Yvonne Hanson-Nortey	Shot put	16.52	5
Karen Pugh	Discus throw	54.72	(bronze)
Julia Avis	Discus throw	52.48	4
Kathryn Farr	Discus throw	51.08	6
Tessa Sanderson	Javelin	69.80	(gold)
Fatima Whitbread	Javelin	68.54	(silver)
Anna Jane Lockton	Javelin	52.90	7

Combined events – Heptathlon

Athlete	Event	100H	HJ	SP	200 m	LJ	JT	800 m	Final	Rank
Judy Simpson	Result	13.11	1.85	14.36	24.99	6.21	36.52	2:13.72	6282	1st place, gold medalist(s)
Judy Simpson	Points	1108	1041	818	888	915	601		6282	1st place, gold medalist(s)
Kim Hagger	Result	13.45	1.79	12.20	25.02	6.30	35.72	2:15.63	5823	3rd place, bronze medalist(s)
Kim Hagger	Points	1058	966	674	885	943	585		5823	3rd place, bronze medalist(s)
Joanne Mulliner	Result	14.31	1.79	12.91	25.35	5.81	35.24	2:20.68	5659	4
Joanne Mulliner	Points	935	966	721	855	792	576		5659	4

== Badminton ==
Athlete	Event	Round of 16	Quarterfinals	Semifinals	Final/ Bronze Medal Match	Rank
Athlete	Event	Opposition Score	Opposition Score	Opposition Score	Opposition Score	Rank
Steve Baddeley	Men's singles	Darren Mcdonald (AUS); W (15-4, 15-8)	Graeme Robson (NZL); W (15-5, 15-9)	Alexander White (SCO); W (15-10, 15-4)	Szu Yu (AUS); W (15-8, 15-8)	(gold)
Nick Yates	Men's singles	Hung Lai (HKG); W (15-1, 15-2)	Phil Horne (NZL); W (15-2, 15-2)	Szu Yu (AUS); L (15-6, 15-9)	Alexander White (SCO); W (15-9, 15-10)	(bronze)
Helen Troke	Women's singles	Katrin Lockey (NZL); W (11-4, 11-1)	Linda Clotier (CAN); W (11-2, 11-0)	Clark (ENG); W (11-8, 11-2)	Elliot (ENG); W (11-4, 11-4)	(gold)
Gillian Clark	Women's singles	Rhonda Cator (AUS); W (11-3, 11-4)	Claire Sharpe (CAN); W (11-11, 11-6)	Troke (ENG); L (11-8, 11-2)	Denyse Julien (CAN); W (11-3, 11-3)	(bronze)
Gillian Gowers	Women's singles	Toni Whittaker (NZL); W (11-2, 11-8)	Denyse Julien (CAN); L (12-10, 11-6)	did not advance		
Fiona Elliot	Women's singles	Sandra Skillings (CAN); W (11-0, 11-4)	Lesley Roberts (WAL); W (11-2, 11-1)	Denyse Julien (CAN); W (11-6, 11-0)	Troke (ENG); L (11-4, 11-4)	(silver)
Andy Goode; Nigel Tier	Men's doubles	Alexander White; Iain Pringle (SCO); W (10-15, 15-6, 17-16)	Darren Mcdonald; Gordon Lang (AUS); W (13-15, 15-8, 15-10)	Kewin Harrison; Gordon Stewart (NZL); W (15-9, 15-5)	Billy Gilliland; Dan Travers (SCO); L (15-8, 15-8)	(silver)
Gillian Clark; Gillian Gowers	Women's doubles	Elinor Allen; Jenny Allen (SCO); W (15-2, 15-9)	Karen Jupp; Tracey Small (AUS); W (15-2, 15-1)	Claire Sharpe; Linda Cloutier (CAN); W (15-10, 15-6)	Johanne Falardeau; Denyse Julien (CAN); W (15-6, 15-7)	(gold)
Helen Troke; Fiona Elliott	Women's doubles	—N/a	Toni Whittaker; Katrin Lockey (NZL); W (15-12, 15-5)	Johanne Falardeau; Denyse Julien (CAN); L (15-11, 15-2)	Claire Sharpe; Linda Cloutier (CAN); W (15-8, 15-11)	(bronze)
Nigel Tier; Gillian Gowers	Mixed doubles	Mike Butler; Claire Sharpe (CAN); W (15-11, 15-12)	Michael Scandolera; Audrey Tuckey (AUS); L (15-7, 17-15)	did not advance		
Richard Outterside; Gillian Clark	Mixed doubles	Hung Lai; Amy Chan (HKG); W (15-11, 15-7)	Mike Butler; Ken Poole (CAN); L (6-15, 15-6, 15-7)	did not advance		
Andy Goode; Fiona Elliott	Mixed doubles	Paul Kong; Tracey Small (AUS); W (15-11, 17-14)	Alexander White; Iain Pringle (SCO); W (15-10, 15-0)	Billy Gilliland; Christine Heatly (SCO); W (15-14, 18-15)	Michael Scandolera; Audrey Tuckey (AUS); L (15-7, 15-5)	(silver)
England	Mixed team	—N/a	Northern Ireland; W 5-0; Australia; W 3-2	Scotland; W 4-1	Canada; W 5-0	(gold)

== Boxing ==
Athlete	Event	Quarterfinals	Semifinals	Finals	
Athlete	Event	Opposition Result	Opposition Result	Opposition Result	Rank
Mark Epton	Light flyweight (48kg)	Robert Regan (WAL) W	Wilson Docherty (SCO) W	Scotty Olson (CAN) L	2nd place, silver medalist(s)
John Lyon	Flyweight (51kg)	—N/a	Steve Beaupré (CAN) W	Leonard Makhanya (SWZ) W	1st place, gold medalist(s)
Sean Murphy	Bantamweight (54kg)	Paul Kunene (SAM) W	Glen Brooks (SCO) W	Roy Nash (NIR) W	1st place, gold medalist(s)
Peter English	Featherweight (57kg)	Calvin Magagula (SWZ) W	Christopher Caleton (NIR) W	Bill Downey (NIR) L	2nd place, silver medalist(s)
Joey Jacobs	Lightweight (60kg)	Brian Williams (AUS) W	Asif Dar (CAN) L	did not advance	3rd place, bronze medalist(s)
Darren Dyer	Welterweight (67kg)	Darren Obah (AUS) W	Damien Denny (NIR) W	James McAllister (SCO) W	1st place, gold medalist(s)
Rod Douglas	Middleweight (75kg)	Eggerton Marcus (CAN) W	George Ferrie (SCO) W	Jeff Harding (AUS) W	1st place, gold medalist(s)
Jim Moran	Light heavyweight (81kg)	Pu'a Don Ulberg (SAM) W	Brent Kosolofski (CAN) W	Harry Lawson (SCO) W	1st place, gold medalist(s)
Eric Cardouza	Heavyweight (91kg)	—N/a	Doug Young (SCO) L	did not advance	3rd place, bronze medalist(s)
James Oyebola	Super Heavyweight (>91kg)	—N/a	Lennox Lewis (CAN) L	did not advance	3rd place, bronze medalist(s)

== Cycling ==
Men

Athlete	Event	Heat		Quarterfinal		Semifinal		Final/Bronze Medal Match	
Athlete	Event	Time/ Score	Rank	Time/ Score	Result	Time/ Score	Result	Time/ Score	Rank
Gary Coltman	Time trial	—N/a						1.07.83	6
Jon Walshaw	Time trial	—N/a						1.09.12	12
Colin Sturgess	Time trial	—N/a						1.09.12	13
Paul McHugh	Sprint	Q		2-1	W	2-0	L	2-0	4
Colin Sturgess	Individual pursuit	4:51.23	2 Q	4:49.80	W	4:45.15	W	L	(silver)
Rob Muzio	Individual pursuit	4:58.48	7 Q	4:57.35	W	4:45.43	L	4:57.59	4
Chris Boardman	Individual pursuit	5:02.68	8 Q	DNF	L	did not advance			
Chris Boardman; Gary Coltman; Rob Muzio; Jon Walshaw	Team pursuit	4:33.05	3 Q	—N/a		4:31.37	L	W	(bronze)
Jon Walshaw	10 miles scratch	—N/a						-	4
Adrian Adgar	10 miles scratch	—N/a						-	12
Martin Webster	10 miles scratch	—N/a						-	unplaced
Gary Coltman	10 miles scratch	—N/a						-	unplaced
Paul Curran	Road race	—N/a						4:08.50	(gold)
Deno Davie	Road race	—N/a						4:11.19	4
Alan Gornall	Road race	—N/a						4:12.35	9
Chris Lillywhite	Road race	—N/a						4:12.46	10
Paul Curran; Deno Davie; Alan Gornall; Keith Reynolds	Road team time trial	—N/a						2:13.16	(gold)

== Judo ==
Demonstration event only

Men

Athlete	Events	Medals
Mark Adshead	65kg half-lightweight	Bronze medal
Kerrith Brown	71kg lightweight	Gold medal
Fitzroy Davies	78kg half-middleweight	Bronze medal
Mark Earle	71kg lightweight	Bronze medal
Neil Eckersley	60kg extra-lightweight	Silver medal
Carl Finney	60kg extra-lightweight	Gold medal
Elvis Gordon	+95kg half-heavyweight	Gold medal
Nicholas Kokotaylo	95kg half-heavyweight	Gold medal
Ray Stevens	86kg middleweight	Gold medal
David Rance	65kg half-lightweight	Silver medal
Paul Sheals	78kg half-middleweight	Gold medal
Dennis Stewart	95kg half-heavyweight	Bronze medal
Densign White	86kg middleweight	Silver medal

Women

Athlete	Events	Medals
Diane Bell	61kg half-middleweight	Gold medal
Sandra Bradshaw	+72kg heavyweight	Gold medal
Karen Briggs	48kg extra-lightweight	Gold medal
An Hughes	56kg lightweight	Gold medal
Sharon Lee	+72kg heavyweight	Bronze medal
Anne Lucitt	72kg half-heavyweight	Silver medal
Anisah Mohamoodally	48kg extra-lightweight	Bronze medal
Dawn Netherwood	65kg middleweight	Silver medal
Teresa Quoi	61kg half-middleweight	Bronze medal
Sharon Rendle	52kg half-lightweight	Gold medal
Joanne Spinks	72kg half-heavyweight	Bronze medal
Rowena Sweatman	66kg middleweight	Bronze medal

== Lawn bowls ==
The lawn bowls were held at Balgreen at the Balgreen Bowling Club.

Men

Athlete	Event	Round Robin												Rank
Athlete	Event	Score	Score	Score	Score	Score	Score	Score	Score	Score	Score	Score	Score	Rank
Andy Thomson	Singles	Hill (WAL); W 21 - 19	Corsie (SCO); L 21 - 12	Dickison (NZL); L 21 - 20	Espie (NIR); L 21 - 14	Le Marquand (JEY); L 21 - 9	Smith (GGY); W 21 - 18	Bosley (HKG); W 21 - 9	Fong (FIJ); 21 -7	Young (MAW); W 21 - 11	Wallace (CAN); W 21 - 14	David (BOT); W 21 - 19	Schuback (AUS); W 21 - 14	6
Chris Ward; David Ward	Pairs	Wales; L 21 - 19	Scotland; L 22 - 12	Northern Ireland; W 27 - 20	Botswana; W 20 - 15	New Zealand; W 22 - 15	Malawi; L 23 - 13	Jersey; W 24 - 8	Hong Kong; L 22 - 16	Australia; W 21 - 16	Canada; W 26 - 17	Fiji; W 25 - 14	Guernsey; W 37 - 8	(bronze)
Julian Haines; Len Bowden; Martyn Sekjer; Pip Branfield	Fours	Wales; L 19 - 17	Swaziland; W 22 - 10	Scotland; L 23 - 15	Northern Ireland; L 29 - 12	New Zealand; L 22 - 19	Hong Kong; L 25 - 17	Guernsey; W 21 - 11	Canada; W 23 - 19	Australia; L 17 - 16	Botswana; W 31 - 13	Fiji; W 24 - 17	—N/a	7

Women

Athlete	Event	Round Robin												Rank
Athlete	Event	Score	Score	Score	Score	Score	Score	Score	Score	Score	Score	Score	Score	Rank
Wendy Line	Singles	Dainton (WAL); L 21 - 13	McCrone (SCO); W 21 - 8	Bell (NIR); W 21 - 14	Anderson (BOT); W 21 - 14	Blattman (JEY); W 21 - 7	Ryan (NZL); W 21 - 4	Humphreys (HKG); W 21 - 9	Fahey (AUS); 21 - 16	Le Tissier (GGY); W 21 - 19	Lum On (FIJ); W 21 - 20	Hunter (CAN); L 21 - 15	—N/a	(gold)
Betty Stubbings; Jean Valls	Pairs	Guernsey; L 21 - 14	Scotland; L 25 - 10	Australia; W 22 - 12	Northern Ireland; L 21 - 15	Hong Kong; L 24 - 15	Wales; W 25 - 16	Fiji; W 39 - 13	Canada; W 24 - 12	Botswana; W 23 - 16	New Zealand	—N/a		(bronze)
Barbara Fuller; Brenda Atherton; Madge Allan; Mary Price	Fours	Australia; L 18 - 16	Guernsey; W 29 - 11	Scotland; W 19 - 18	Botswana; W 22 - 10	New Zealand; W 32 - 5	Northern Ireland; W 22 - 16	Hong Kong; L 21 - 14	Wales; L 25 - 21	Swaziland; L 21 - 18	Fiji; W 37 - 6	Canada; W 23 - 9	Malawi	(bronze)

== Rowing ==
Men

Athlete	Event	Heat		Repechage		Final	
Athlete	Event	Time	Rank	Time	Rank	Time	Rank
Steve Redgrave	Single sculls	7:38.01	1 Q	—N/a		7:28.29	(gold)
Carl Smith; Allan Whitwell	Double sculls	7:24.63	1 Q	—N/a		6:23.53	(bronze)
Andy Holmes; Steve Redgrave	Coxless pairs	7:08.33	1 Q	—N/a		6:40.48	(gold)
Graham Faultless; Richard Ireland; Mostyn Field; Humphry Hatton	Coxless fours	6:54.01	2	Q		6:05.99	(bronze)
Martin Cross; Adam Clift; Andy Holmes; Steve Redgrave; Adrian Ellison	Coxed fours	6:29.05	1 Q	—N/a		6:08.13	(gold)
Jonathan Spencer-Jones; Patrick Broughton; John Garrett; John Maxey; Terence Dillon; Mark Buckingham; Stephen Peel; Richard Stanhope; Vaughan Thomas	Eights	—N/a				5:46.35	(silver)
Carl Smith	Lightweight single sculls	7:28.04	1 Q	—N/a		7:27.34	(bronze)
Christopher Bates; Peter Haining; Neil Staite; Stuart Forbes	Lightweight coxless fours	—N/a				6:25.86	(gold)

Women

Athlete	Event	Final	
Athlete	Event	Time	Rank
Gillian Bond	Single sculls	7:52.82	(bronze)
Diane Prince; Claire Parker	Double sculls	7:54.71	(bronze)
Pauline Bird; Flo Johnston	Coxless pairs	7:42.23	(silver)
Joanne Gough; Ann Callaway; Kate Holroyd; Trish Reid; Alison Norrish	Coxed fours	7:06.02	(bronze)
Flo Johnston; Pauline Bird; Kate Grose; Alison Bonner; Kate Holroyd; Ann Callaway; Joanne Gough; Trish Reid; Alison Norrish	Eights	6:45.62	(silver)
Beryl Crockford	Lightweight single sculls	7:58.05	4
Alexa Forbes; Gillian Hodges; Lin Clark; Judith Burne	Lightweight coxless fours	6:54.70	(gold)

== Shooting ==
Open events
Pistol

Athlete	Event	Final	
Athlete	Event	Points	Rank
Richard Wang	Free Pistol	537	9
Paul Leatherdale	Free Pistol	533	11
Richard Wang; Paul Leatherdale	Free Pistol – Pairs	1090	(silver)
Bob Northover	Centre-Fire Pistol	583	(gold)
Michael Cutler	Centre-Fire Pistol	577	5
Bob Northover; Michael Cutler	Centre-Fire Pistol – Pairs	1157	(silver)
Brian Girling	Rapid-Fire Pistol	581	5
Terry Turner	Rapid-Fire Pistol	574	12
Brian Girling; Terry Turner	Rapid-Fire Pistol – Pairs	1169	(gold)
Paul Leatherdale	Air Pistol	571	5
Ian Reid	Air Pistol	569	7
Paul Leatherdale; Ian Reid	Air Pistol – Pairs	1143	(gold)

Rifle

Athlete	Event	Final	
Athlete	Event	Points	Rank
Sarah Cooper	Rifle Prone	594	10
David Staniforth	Rifle Prone	593	15
David Staniforth; Sarah Cooper	Rifle Prone – Pairs	1148	8
Malcolm Cooper	Rifle Three Positions	1170	(gold)
Sarah Cooper	Rifle Three Positions	1128	8
Malcolm Cooper; Sarah Cooper	Rifle Three Positions – Pairs	2278	(gold)
John Bloomfield	Full Bore Rifle	395	(bronze)
Nick Crawshaw	Full Bore Rifle	391	9
John Bloomfield; Nick Crawshaw	Full Bore Rifle – Pairs	582	4
Malcolm Cooper	Air Rifle	582	(bronze)
Robert Smith	Air Rifle	572	10
Malcolm Cooper; Robert Smith	Air Rifle – Pairs	1146	(bronze)

Shotgun

Athlete	Event	Final	
Athlete	Event	Points	Rank
Ian Peel	Trap	195	(gold)
Peter Boden	Trap	192	(silver)
Ian Peel; Peter Boden	Trap – Pairs	185	(gold)
Joe Neville	Skeet	195	(silver)
Ken Harman	Skeet	193	5
Joe Neville; Ken Harman	Skeet – Pairs	195	(gold)

== Weightlifting ==
Athlete	Event	Weight Lifted		Total	Rank
Athlete	Event	Snatch	Clean & jerk	Total	Rank
Sam Heyer	56kg	withdrew			
Geoff Laws	60kg	Eliminated after snatch			
Dean Willey	67.5kg	145.0	170.0	315.0	(gold)
Peter May	82.5kg	142.5	175.0	317.5	(bronze)
Tony Supple	82.5kg	135.0	175.0	310.0	4
Keith Boxell	90kg	155.0	195.0	350.0	(gold)
David Mercer	90kg	152.5	190.0	342.5	(silver)
Duncan Dawkins	100kg	147.5	185.0	332.5	(silver)
Andrew Saxton	100kg	140.0	187.5	327.5	(bronze)
Mark Groombridge	110kg	155.0	200.0	355.0	4

== Wrestling ==
Men

Athlete	Event	Group rounds		Finals	
Athlete	Event	Opposition Result	Opposition Result	Opposition Result	Rank
Duncan Burns	Light flyweight (48kg)	Ron Moncur (CAN) L	David Connelly (SCO) W	—N/a	(silver)
Nigel Donohue	Flyweight (52kg)	—N/a	Chris Woodcroft (CAN) L	Shane Stannett (NZL) W	(bronze)
Brian Aspen	Bantamweight (57kg)	Paul Kirkby (AUS) W	Mitch Ostberg (CAN) L	Paul Nedley (SCO) W	(bronze)
Gavin Beswick	Featherweight (62kg)	Brian Miller (SCO) W	Dan Cumming (CAN) L	Stephen Bell (NZL)	4
Steve Cooper	Lightweight (68kg)	—N/a	Dave McKay (CAN) L	Chris McKay (SCO) W	(bronze)
Fitzlloyd Walker	Welterweight (74kg)	—N/a	Gary Holmes (CAN) L	Calum McNeill (SCO) W	(bronze)
Tony Bull	Middleweight (82kg)	Chris Rinke (CAN) L	Eddie Cusak (NIR) W	—N/a	(bronze)
Noel Loban	Light heavyweight (90kg)	—N/a	Alan Thompson (AUS) W	Doug Cox (CAN) W	(gold)
David Kilpin	Heavyweight (100kg)	Robert Algie (NZL) L	Willie Robertson (SCO) W	Gabriel Toth (AUS) W	(bronze)
Keith Peache	Super heavyweight (130kg)	—N/a	Wayne Brightwell (CAN) L	Dru Schaffer (AUS) W	(bronze)
