= Ali Bonner =

British rower

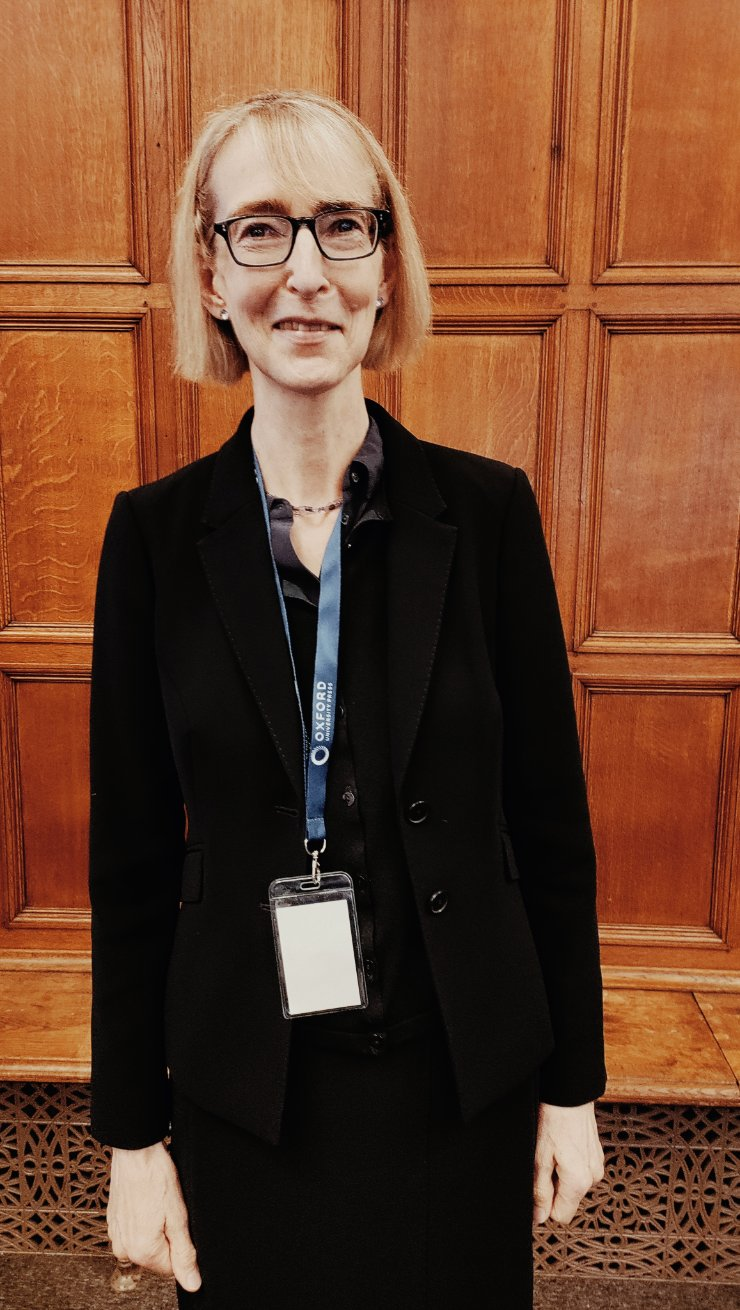
- Dr Ali Bonner, Oxford, August 2024
- Born: Alison C. Bonner; 27 June 1962 (age 64); London, England
- Sports career
- Sport: Rowing
Medal record
Women's rowing
Representing England
Commonwealth Games
Silver medal – second place	1986 Edinburgh	eight

Academic background
- Education: Hughes Hall, Cambridge

Academic work
- Discipline: Medieval history, Celtic studies
- Institutions: University of Cambridge
- Notable works: The Myth of Pelagianism (2018)

Alison C. Bonner (born 27 June 1962) is a British former rower who competed in the 1988 Summer Olympics. She is also an Associate Professor of Celtic History in the Medieval period at the Department for Anglo-Saxon, Norse and Celtic at the University of Cambridge, and a Fellow of Queens' College, Cambridge. Bonner is a specialist on Pelagius and the manuscript transmission of his writings, as well as ascetic literature on fourth and fifth century CE.

== Rowing career ==
Bonner was part of the coxed four with Sarah Hunter-Jones, Tish Reid, Ann Callaway and Lesley Clare (cox) that won the national title, rowing for A.R.A. squad, at the 1985 National Championships. The following year, she represented England and won a silver medal in the eight at the 1986 Commonwealth Games in Edinburgh, Scotland.

In 1987, Bonner was part of the coxless pair with Kim Thomas that won the national title, rowing for a Kingston and Weybridge Ladies composite, at the 1987 National Championships.

In 1988, she was selected to represent Great Britain in the women's coxless pair event at the 1988 Summer Olympics in Seoul. The pair which consisted of Bonner and Thomas finished in eighth place.

== Academic career ==
Following her Olympic career, Bonner undertook doctoral research in the Department of Anglo-Saxon, Norse and Celtic at Cambridge, receiving a PhD in 2012. Her doctoral thesis was titled The Scale, Context, and Implications, of the Manuscript Transmission of Pelagius' Ad Demetriadem. Bonner has been a lecturer in Celtic History in the Department of Anglo-Saxon, Norse and Celtic at the University of Cambridge since 2016. She joined Queens' College, Cambridge as a Fellow in 2019. She studied for her Ph.D. in Anglo-Saxon, Norse and Celtic at Hughes Hall, Cambridge.

== Research ==
Bonner published a monograph, The Myth of Pelagianism, with the British Academy in 2018. The volume was reviewed by Professor Josef Lössl as 'important and valuable' and can 'be recommended as a substantial contribution to the study of Pelagius and his works and thought.' Bonner wrote the article, 'In Praise of Pelagius', for the Church Times on the publication of her monograph.
