= Annabelle Cripps =

British swimmer

Katherine Starr (born Annabelle Cripps)
Personal information
- Full name: Katherine Starr (born Annabelle Mary Cripps)
- National team: Great Britain
- Born: 16 February 1968 (age 58) Madison, Wisconsin, US
- Height: 1.80 m (5 ft 11 in)
- Weight: 66 kg (146 lb; 10.4 st)

Sport
- Sport: Swimming
- Strokes: Freestyle
- Club: Wigan Swim Club
- College team: University of Texas (US)
Medal record
Women's swimming
Representing England
Commonwealth Games
Silver medal – second place	1986 Edinburgh	4×100 m freestyle
Silver medal – second place	1986 Edinburgh	4×200 m freestyle

Katherine Starr® (born Annabelle Mary Cripps; 16 February 1968), Olympian (1984 & 1988) / Legal Theorist/ Author: Rescue Me: A Powerful Memoir By An Olympian, represented Great Britain at two consecutive Summer Olympics, starting in 1984. At her 1984 Summer Games Olympic debut in Los Angeles, she placed sixth in the women's 4×100-metre freestyle relay, followed by finishing 14th in the women's 800-metre freestyle and then 15th in the 200-metre freestyle four years later at the 1988 Summer Olympics in Seoul, South Korea.

She represented England and won two silver medals at the 1986 Commonwealth Games in Edinburgh, Scotland, in the 4×100 metres and the 4×200 metres freestyle relay.

She is 14 times All-American honors swimmer at the University of Texas at Austin participated on three consecutive NCAA Division I Women's Swimming and Diving Championships 1986, 1987, 1988.

Starr co-authored British Journal of Sports Medicine – International Olympic Committee consensus statement: harassment and abuse (non-accidental violence) in sport

Katherine Starr® is the author of the book published in 2022 – Rescue Me: A Powerful Memoir By An Olympian. Press Release for the book

Katherine is currently an Expert Witness for Athlete Sexual Abuse. Through her expertise, she has opined on over twenty cases with record-breaking settlements.

Since 2025, under her professionally trademarked name Katherine Starr®, a legal theorist, has developed several legal frameworks addressing digital harm and institutional accountability. These include Negligent Digital Access®, Negligent Digital Architecture®, , and Negligent Dating®, registered as trademarks through her company, KStarr Enterprises.

== Swimming career ==
=== 1984 Olympics ===
Cripps represented Great Britain at the 1984 Summer Olympics where she finished 15th in the 200 m freestyle, 14th in the 800 m freestyle and then 6th as part of the British team in the 4×100 m freestyle relay.

=== 1986 Commonwealth Games ===
She represented England and won two silver medals in the 4 x 100 metres and 4 x 200 metres freestyle relay, at the 1986 Commonwealth Games in Edinburgh, Scotland.

=== 1988 Olympics ===
Cripps once again represented Great Britain at the 1988 Summer Olympics where she finished 27th in the 50 m freestyle, 25th in the 100 m freestyle, 21st in the 100 m butterfly and then 10th as part of the British team in the 4×100 freestyle relay.
