= Karen Mellor (swimmer) =

British swimmer

Personal information
- Born: 6 May 1969 (age 57) Great Yarmouth, England

Sport
- Sport: Swimming
Medal record
Swimming
Representing England
Commonwealth Games
Silver medal – second place	1986 Edinburgh	freestyle relay

Karen Mellor (born 6 May 1969) is a retired British swimmer.

== Swimming career ==
Mellor competed in the women's 800 metre freestyle at the 1988 Summer Olympics. She represented England and won a silver medal in the 4 x 200 metres freestyle relay, at the 1986 Commonwealth Games in Edinburgh, Scotland. Four years later, she represented England in the 400 metres and 800 metres freestyle, at the 1990 Commonwealth Games in Auckland, New Zealand. She also won the 1985 ASA National Championship in the 200 metres freestyle and was three times winner of the 400 metres freestyle in 1985, 1989, and 1990.
