= Roland Lee =

British swimmer

Personal information
- Full name: Roland George Lee
- National team: Great Britain
- Born: 30 July 1964 (age 61) Bicester, England
- Height: 1.94 m (6 ft 4 in)
- Weight: 87 kg (192 lb; 13.7 st)

Sport
- Sport: Swimming
- Strokes: Freestyle
- Club: Nova Centurion, City of Cardiff SC, City of Birmingham SC
Medal record
Men's swimming
Representing Great Britain
European Championships (LC)
Silver medal – second place	1987 Strasbourg	4×100 m medley
Representing England
Commonwealth Games
Silver medal – second place	1986 Edinburgh	4×100 m medley
Bronze medal – third place	1986 Edinburgh	4×100 m freestyle

Roland George Lee (born 30 July 1964) is an English former competitive swimmer, who attended Tewkesbury School.

== Swimming career ==
Lee competed in the European championships and three consecutive Olympics for Great Britain, and swam for England in the Commonwealth Games. Lee specialised in the 100 metres freestyle.

He represented England and won a silver medal in the 4 x 100 metres medley relay and a bronze medal in the 4 x 100 metres freestyle relay, at the 1986 Commonwealth Games in Edinburgh, Scotland. He was also a two times winner of the ASA National Championship in the 100 metres freestyle in (1986 and 1987) and the 1988 200 metres freestyle champion.

== See also ==
- List of Commonwealth Games medallists in swimming (men)
