= Terence Dillon =

British rower (born 1964)

Personal information
- Full name: Terence Grant Dillon
- Born: 8 May 1964 (age 62) Skipton, England

Sport
- Sport: Rowing
- Club: Leander Club, Henley-on-Thames
Medal record
Rowing
Representing England
Commonwealth Games
Silver medal – second place	1986 Edinburgh	eight

Terence Dillon (born 8 May 1964) is a British retired rower. Dillon competed at the 1988 Summer Olympics and the 1992 Summer Olympics. He represented England and won a silver medal in the eight, at the 1986 Commonwealth Games in Edinburgh, Scotland. He competed for Great Britain in the 1993 World Championships.
