= John Maxey =

British rower

Personal information
- Born: 19 July 1958 (age 67) Royal Tunbridge Wells, England

Sport
- Sport: Rowing
- Club: Leander Club, Henley-on-Thames
Medal record
Rowing
Representing England
Commonwealth Games
Silver medal – second place	1986 Edinburgh	eight

John M Maxey (born 19 July 1958) is a British retired rower.

== Rowing career ==
Maxey competed in the men's coxed four event at the 1988 Summer Olympics. He represented England and won a silver medal in the eight, at the 1986 Commonwealth Games in Edinburgh, Scotland.
