= Carolyn Roscoe =

British diver

Personal information
- Born: August 2, 1966 (age 59) Luton, England

Carolyn Roscoe (born August 2, 1966), is a former diver who competed for Great Britain and England.

== Diving career ==
Roscoe represented Great Britain at the 1984 Summer Olympics and the 1988 Summer Olympics.

She also represented England in both the 3 metres springboard and 10 metres platform events, at the 1986 Commonwealth Games in Edinburgh, Scotland.

She was a member of 'The Ladies' Diving Club.
