= Ivor Lloyd =

British retired rower

Personal information
- Full name: Ivor Barry Lloyd
- Born: March 1950 (age 76) Eastbourne, England

Sport
- Club: Leander Club

Ivor Barry Lloyd (born 1950) is a British retired rower.

== Rowing career ==
Lloyd was part of the quad scull that finished 7th overall after winning the B final at the 1977 World Rowing Championships in Amsterdam.

== Administration ==
He was the Managing Director of Dorney Lake 2005 until 2016 and since 1985 has had an association with the Leander Club in various roles as Captain, Director of Rowing and Chairman.
