= Nick Hodgson (swimmer) =

British swimmer (born 1964)

Personal information
- Born: 26 November 1964 (age 61) Blackburn, England

Sport
- Sport: Swimming
Medal record
Bronze medal – third place	1986 Edinburgh	200m butterfly

Nick Hodgson (born 26 November 1964) is a British swimmer.

== Swimming career ==
Hodgson competed at the 1984 Summer Olympics and the 1988 Summer Olympics. He represented England in the 200 metres butterfly, at the 1982 Commonwealth Games in Brisbane, Queensland, Australia. Four years later he represented England and won a bronze medal in the 200 metres butterfly, at the 1986 Commonwealth Games in Edinburgh, Scotland. He also won the ASA National Championship title in the 200 metres butterfly in 1985 and 1986.
