= Neil Harper =

British swimmer

Personal information
- Born: 21 February 1965 (age 61) Pembury, Kent, England

Sport
- Sport: Swimming
Medal record
Swimming
Representing England
Commonwealth Games
Silver medal – second place	1986 Edinburgh	medley relay

Neil Harper (born 21 February 1965) is a British retired swimmer.

== Early life ==
Harper attended Millfield School from 1979 to 1984, and was head boy.

== Career ==
Harper competed at the 1984 Summer Olympics and the 1988 Summer Olympics. He represented England and won a silver medal in the 4 x 100 metres medley relay, at the 1986 Commonwealth Games in Edinburgh, Scotland, in addition to competing in the 100 metres backstroke event. He also won the 1986 ASA National Championship title in the 100 metres backstroke.
