= Clarence Callender =

British sprinter (born 1961)

Personal information
- Nationality: English
- Born: 16 November 1961 (age 64) East Ham, London

Sport
- Sport: Athletics
- Club: Haringey AC, London
Medal record
Athletics
Representing England
Commonwealth Games
| Silver medal – second place | 1986 Edinburgh | 4x100m relay |
| Gold medal – first place | 1990 Auckland | 4x100m relay |

Clarence H Callender (born 16 November 1961 in East Ham) is a male British former sprinter and athletics coach

== Athletics career ==
Callender competed in the 1988 Summer Olympics. He represented England and competed in the 100 metres and won a silver medal in the 4 × 100 metres relay event, at the 1986 Commonwealth Games in Edinburgh, Scotland. Four years later he represented England and won a gold medal in the 4 × 100 metres relay event with John Regis, Marcus Adam, Linford Christie and Tony Jarrett (heat runner), at the 1990 Commonwealth Games in Auckland, New Zealand. In the 1989 IAAF World Cup, his team won second place in the 4 × 100 m relay.

== Coaching ==
After retiring from competitive sprinting, Callender became an athletics coach, specializing in speed and relay transitions.
