= Alison Norrish =

British rower

Alison Norrish FREng
Personal information
- Full name: Alison Ruth M. Norrish
- Born: 19 December 1968 (age 57) Windlesham, England

Sport
- Sport: Rowing
- Club: Weybridge Ladies ARC
Medal record
Women's rowing
Representing England
Commonwealth Games
Silver medal – second place	1986 Edinburgh	eight
Bronze medal – third place	1986 Edinburgh	coxed four

Alison Ruth M. Norrish (born 19 December 1968) is a British retired rowing coxswain. Norrish competed in the women's coxed four event at the 1988 Summer Olympics. She represented England and won a silver medal in the eight and a bronze medal in the coxed four at the 1986 Commonwealth Games in Edinburgh, Scotland. She was a member of the eight that won the national title rowing for a A.R.A squad at the 1987 National Championships.

In 2026 she was elected a Fellow of the Royal Academy of Engineering.
