= Rowing at the 1992 Summer Olympics – Men's coxed four =

Men's coxed four at the Games of the XXV Olympiad
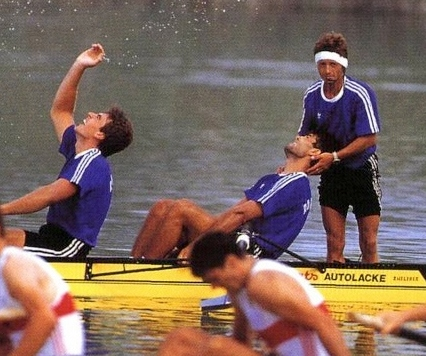
- Gold medal Romanian team
- Venue: Lake of Banyoles
- Dates: 27 July – 1 August 1992
- Competitors: 60 from 12 nations
- Winning time: 5:59.37

Medalists
1st place, gold medalist(s)		Romania: Iulică Ruican; Viorel Talapan; Dimitrie Popescu; Dumitru Răducanu; Nicolae Țaga
2nd place, silver medalist(s)		Germany: Ralf Brudel; Uwe Kellner; Thoralf Peters; Karsten Finger; Hendrik Reiher
3rd place, bronze medalist(s)		Poland: Wojciech Jankowski; Maciej Łasicki; Jacek Streich; Tomasz Tomiak; Michał Cieślak

The men's coxed four competition at the 1992 Summer Olympics took place at took place at Lake of Banyoles, Spain. It was held from 27 July to 1 August. There were 12 boats (60 competitors) from 12 nations, with each nation limited to a single boat in the event. The event was won by Romania, the nation's first victory in the event; the Romanian team had taken silver in 1988. Germany, recently re-united, took silver in 1992; East Germany had won gold in 1988. Two men returned from the 1988 podium to medal again in 1992: Dimitrie Popescu of Romania and Hendrik Reiher of the former East German team. They were the eighth and ninth men to earn multiple medals in the event; due to the removal of the men's coxed four from the programme, they would be the last. Bronze went to Poland, the nation's fourth bronze medal in the coxed four.

== Background ==
This was the 19th and final appearance of the event. Rowing had been on the programme in 1896 but was cancelled due to bad weather. The coxed four was one of the four initial events introduced in 1900. It was not held in 1904 or 1908, but was held at every Games from 1912 to 1992 when it (along with the men's coxed pair) was replaced with the men's lightweight double sculls and men's lightweight coxless four.

East Germany had been dominant prior to the reunification of Germany, winning gold at the 1980 and 1988 Olympics (missing 1984 due to the Soviet-led boycott) and winning 8 of the 11 World Championships from 1977 to 1990 (with a second and third place finish as well). Germany won the only World Championship between reunification and the Games, in 1991, and was favoured in Barcelona. Romania was a strong challenger; the Romanians had won the 1989 World Championship as well as finishing second in both the 1988 Olympics and the most recent (1991) World Championship.

The People's Republic of China and Croatia each made their debut in the event; some former Soviet republics competed together as the Unified Team. The United States made its 16th appearance, most of any nation.

== Competition format ==
The coxed four event featured five-person boats, with four rowers and a coxswain. It was a sweep rowing event, with the rowers each having one oar (and thus each rowing on one side). The competition used the 2000 metres distance that became standard at the 1912 Olympics and which has been used ever since except at the 1948 Games.

The competition consisted of two main rounds (semifinals and finals) as well as a repechage. The 12 boats were divided into two heats for the semifinals, with 6 boats in each heat. The winner of each heat (2 boats total) advanced directly to the "A" final to compete for medals and 4th through 6th place. The remaining 10 boats were placed in the repechage. The repechage featured two heats, with 5 boats in each heat. The top two boats in each repechage heat (4 boats total) advanced to the "A" final. The remaining 6 boats in the repechage (3rd, 4th, and 5th placers) were placed in the "B" final to compete for 7th through 12th places.

== Schedule ==
All times are Central European Summer Time (UTC+2)

Date	Time	Round
Monday, 27 July 1992	9:30	Semifinals
Wednesday, 29 July 1992	8:40	Repechage
Saturday, 1 August 1992	8:20	Finals

== Results ==
=== Semifinals ===
==== Semifinal 1 ====
Rank	Rowers	Coxswain	Nation	Time	Notes
1	Ralf Brudel; Uwe Kellner; Thoralf Peters; Karsten Finger	Hendrik Reiher	Germany	6:21.47	QA
2	Veniamin But; Igor Bortnitsky; Vladimir Romanishin; Gennadi Kryuçkin	Pyotr Petrinich	Unified Team	6:25.63	R
3	Peter Mulkerrins; Nicholas Burfitt; Terence Dillon; Simon Berrisford	John Deakin	Great Britain	6:27.95	R
4	Sead Marušić; Marko Banović; Ninoslav Saraga; Aleksandar Fabijanić	Goran Puljko	Croatia	6:31.19	R
5	Bill Coventry; Guy Melville; Toni Dunlop; Ian Wright	Carl Sheehan	New Zealand	6:32.61	R
6	Cleber Leite; Otávio Bandeira; José Augusto Loureiro Júnior; José Ribeiro	Alexandre Fernandes	Brazil	6:45.54	R

==== Semifinal 2 ====
Rank	Rowers	Coxswain	Nation	Time	Notes
1	Iulică Ruican; Viorel Talapan; Dimitrie Popescu; Nicolae Țaga	Dumitru Răducanu	Romania	6:17.22	QA
2	James Neil; Teo Bielefeld; Sean Hall; Jack Rusher	Tim Evans	United States	6:21.79	R
3	Feng Feng; Sun Senlin; Huang Xiaoping; Xu Wuling	Li Jianxin	China	6:25.03	R
4	Yannick Schulte; Philippe Lot; Daniel Fauché; Jean-Paul Vergne	Jean-Pierre Huguet-Balent	France	6:26.51	R
5	Wojciech Jankowski; Maciej Łasicki; Jacek Streich; Tomasz Tomiak	Michał Cieślak	Poland	6:27.24	R
6	Ivo Žerava; Richard Krejčí; Jan Kabrhel; Petr Batěk	Martin Svoboda	Czechoslovakia	6:28.83	R

=== Repechage ===
==== Repechage heat 1 ====
Rank	Rowers	Coxswain	Nation	Time	Notes
1	Veniamin But; Igor Bortnitsky; Vladimir Romanishin; Gennadi Kryuçkin	Pyotr Petrinich	Unified Team	6:16.26	QA
2	Wojciech Jankowski; Maciej Łasicki; Jacek Streich; Tomasz Tomiak	Michał Cieślak	Poland	6:16.93	QA
3	Sead Marušić; Marko Banović; Ninoslav Saraga; Aleksandar Fabijanić	Goran Puljko	Croatia	6:18.98	QB
4	Feng Feng; Sun Senlin; Huang Xiaoping; Xu Wuling	Li Jianxin	China	6:26.70	QB
5	Cleber Leite; Otávio Bandeira; José Augusto Loureiro Júnior; José Ribeiro	Alexandre Fernandes	Brazil	6:34.87	QB

==== Repechage heat 2 ====
Rank	Rowers	Coxswain	Nation	Time	Notes
1	James Neil; Teo Bielefeld; Sean Hall; Jack Rusher	Tim Evans	United States	6:18.10	QA
2	Yannick SchultePhilippe Lot; Daniel Fauché; Jean-Paul Vergne	Jean-Pierre Huguet-Balent	France	6:18.77	QA
3	Peter Mulkerrins; Nicholas Burfitt; Terence Dillon; Simon Berrisford	John Deakin	Great Britain	6:21.19	QB
4	Bill Coventry; Guy Melville; Toni Dunlop; Ian Wright	Carl Sheehan	New Zealand	6:25.32	QB
5	Ivo Žerava; Richard Krejčí; Jan Kabrhel; Petr Batěk	Martin Svoboda	Czechoslovakia	6:28.03	QB

=== Finals ===
==== Final B ====
Rank	Rowers	Coxswain	Nation	Time
7	Sead Marušić; Marko Banović; Ninoslav Saraga; Aleksandar Fabijanić	Goran Puljko	Croatia	6:08.52
8	Feng Feng; Sun Senlin; Huang Xiaoping; Xu Wuling	Li Jianxin	China	6:11.52
9	Peter Mulkerrins; Nicholas Burfitt; Terence Dillon; Simon Berrisford	John Deakin	Great Britain	6:12.60
10	Ivo Žerava; Richard Krejčí; Jan Kabrhel; Petr Batěk	Martin Svoboda	Czechoslovakia	6:13.32
11	Bill Coventry; Guy Melville; Toni Dunlop; Ian Wright	Carl Sheehan	New Zealand	6:15.66
12	Cleber Leite; Otávio Bandeira; José Augusto Loureiro Júnior; José Ribeiro	Alexandre Fernandes	Brazil	6:22.00

==== Final A ====
Rank	Rowers	Coxswain	Nation	Time	Notes
1st place, gold medalist(s)	Iulică Ruican; Viorel Talapan; Dimitrie Popescu; Nicolae Țaga	Dumitru Răducanu	Romania	5:59.37	OB
2nd place, silver medalist(s)	Ralf Brudel; Uwe Kellner; Thoralf Peters; Karsten Finger	Hendrik Reiher	Germany	6:00.34	
3rd place, bronze medalist(s)	Wojciech Jankowski; Maciej Łasicki; Jacek Streich; Tomasz Tomiak	Michał Cieślak	Poland	6:03.27	
4	James Neil; Teo Bielefeld; Sean Hall; Jack Rusher	Tim Evans	United States	6:06.03	
5	Yannick Schulte; Philippe Lot; Daniel Fauché; Jean-Paul Vergne	Jean-Pierre Huguet-Balent	France	6:06.82	
6	Veniamin But; Igor Bortnitsky; Vladimir Romanishin; Gennadi Kryuçkin	Pyotr Petrinich	Unified Team	6:12.13	

== Final classification ==
The following rowers took part:

Rank	Rowers	Country
1st place, gold medalist(s)	Iulică Ruican; Viorel Talapan; Dimitrie Popescu; Dumitru Răducanu (cox); Nicolae Țaga	Romania
2nd place, silver medalist(s)	Ralf Brudel; Uwe Kellner; Thoralf Peters; Karsten Finger; Hendrik Reiher (cox)	Germany
3rd place, bronze medalist(s)	Wojciech Jankowski; Maciej Łasicki; Jacek Streich; Tomasz Tomiak; Michał Cieślak (cox)	Poland
	James Neil; Teo Bielefeld; Sean Hall; Jack Rusher; Tim Evans (cox)	United States
	Yannick Schulte; Philippe Lot; Daniel Fauché; Jean-Paul Vergne; Jean-Pierre Huguet-Balent (cox)	France
	Veniamin But; Igor Bortnitsky; Vladimir Romanishin; Gennadi Kryuçkin; Pyotr Petrinich (cox)	Unified Team
	Sead Marušić; Marko Banović; Ninoslav Saraga; Aleksandar Fabijanić; Goran Puljko (cox)	Croatia
	Feng Feng; Sun Senlin; Huang Xiaoping; Xu Wuling; Li Jianxin (cox)	China
	Peter Mulkerrins; Nicholas Burfitt; Terence Dillon; Simon Berrisford; John Deakin (cox)	Great Britain
	Ivo Žerava; Richard Krejčí; Jan Kabrhel; Petr Batěk; Martin Svoboda (cox)	Czechoslovakia
	Bill Coventry; Guy Melville; Toni Dunlop; Ian Wright; Carl Sheehan (cox)	New Zealand
	Cleber Leite; Otávio Bandeira; José Augusto Loureiro Júnior; José Ribeiro; Alexandre Fernandes (cox)	Brazil
