= Rowing at the 1988 Summer Olympics – Men's coxed four =

Men's coxed four at the Games of the XXIV Olympiad
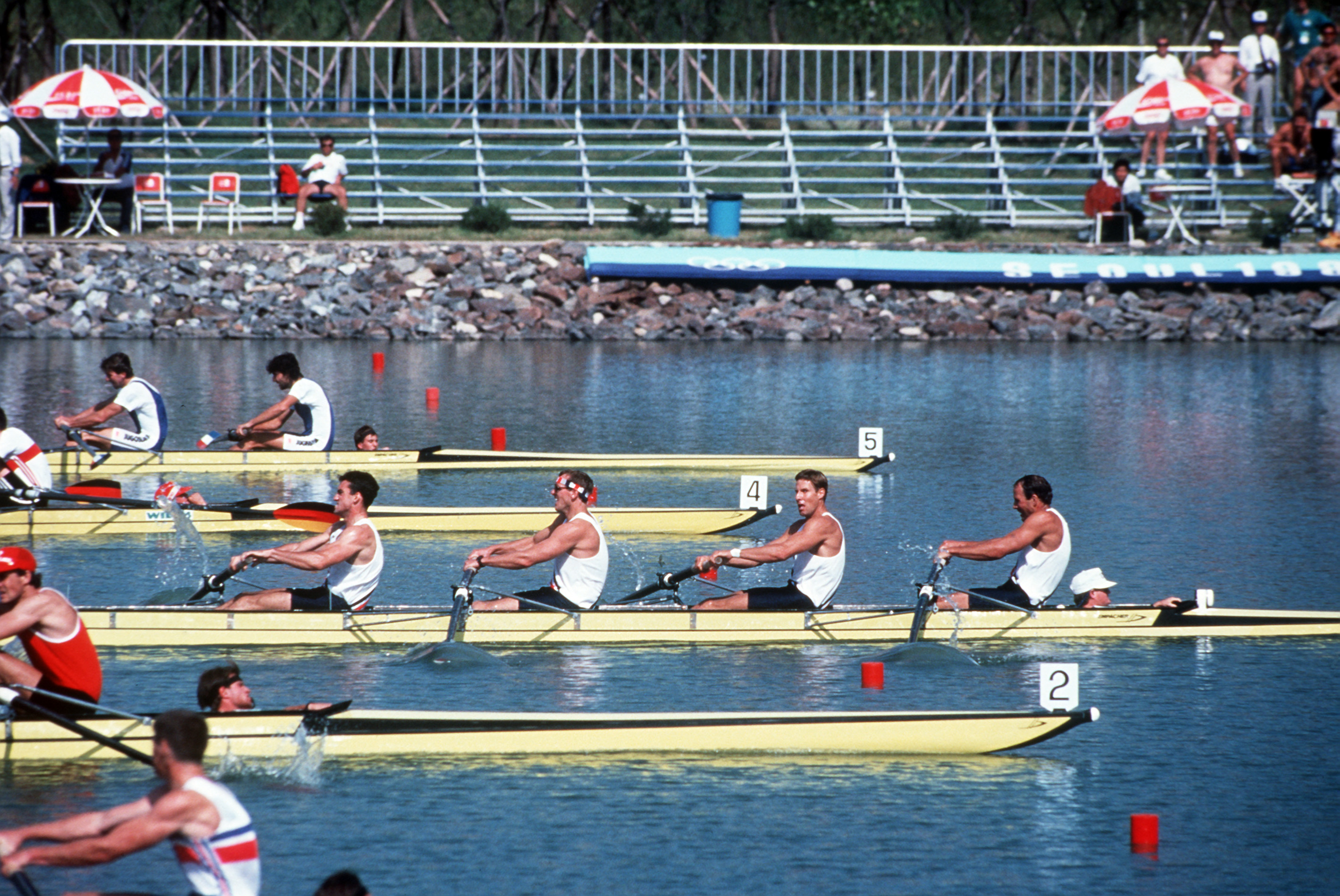
- The final
- Venue: Misari Regatta
- Date: 19–24 September 1988
- Competitors: 71 from 14 nations
- Winning time: 6:10.74

Medalists
1st place, gold medalist(s)		East Germany: Bernd Niesecke; Hendrik Reiher; Karsten Schmeling; Bernd Eichwurzel; Frank Klawonn
2nd place, silver medalist(s)		Romania: Dimitrie Popescu; Ioan Snep; Vasile Tomoiagă; Ladislau Lovrenschi; Valentin Robu
3rd place, bronze medalist(s)		New Zealand: Chris White; Ian Wright; Andrew Bird; Greg Johnston; George Keys

The men's coxed four competition at the 1988 Summer Olympics took place at Misari Regatta, South Korea. It was held from 19 to 24 September. There were 14 boats (71 competitors, with Romania making one substitution) from 14 nations, with each nation limited to a single boat in the event. The event was won by East Germany, returning to the top of the podium after the Soviet-led boycott in 1984 prevented the East Germans from defending their 1980 Olympic title. Silver went to Romania, its first medal in the men's coxed four. New Zealand took a second consecutive bronze medal in the event.

== Background ==
This was the 18th appearance of the event. Rowing had been on the programme in 1896 but was cancelled due to bad weather. The coxed four was one of the four initial events introduced in 1900. It was not held in 1904 or 1908, but was held at every Games from 1912 to 1992 when it (along with the men's coxed pair) was replaced with the men's lightweight double sculls and men's lightweight coxless four.

East Germany was dominant in the men's coxed four, winning 7 of the last 9 World Championships (and placing second and third in the other two) as well as winning the 1980 Olympics; a boycott was seemingly the only way to keep the East Germans off the podium, as had happened at the 1984 Games. With their return to Olympic competition in 1988, they were heavily favoured. Great Britain, the defending Olympic champion from a reduced field, was a potential challenger. The Soviet Union, New Zealand, Italy, and the United States had medaled at the last two World Championships and were also outside contenders.

South Korea made its debut in the event, the first nation to do so since 1976. The United States made its 15th appearance, most of any nation to that point.

== Competition format ==
The coxed four event featured five-person boats, with four rowers and a coxswain. It was a sweep rowing event, with the rowers each having one oar (and thus each rowing on one side). The competition used the 2000 metres distance that became standard at the 1912 Olympics and which has been used ever since except at the 1948 Games.

The competition consisted of three main rounds (quarterfinals, semifinals, and finals) as well as a repechage. The 14 boats were divided into three heats for the quarterfinals, with 4 or 5 boats in each heat. The top three boats in each heat (9 boats total) advanced directly to the semifinals. The remaining 5 boats were placed in the repechage. The repechage featured a single heat, with the top three boats advancing to the semifinals and the remaining 2 boats (4th and 5th placers in the repechage) being eliminated (13th and 14th place overall). The 12 semifinalist boats were divided into two heats of 6 boats each. The top three boats in each semifinal (6 boats total) advanced to the "A" final to compete for medals and 4th through 6th place; the bottom three boats in each semifinal were sent to the "B" final for 7th through 12th.

== Schedule ==
All times are Korea Standard Time adjusted for daylight savings (UTC+10)

Date	Time	Round
Monday, 19 September 1988	10:25	Quarterfinals
Wednesday, 21 September 1988	10:20	Repechage
Thursday, 22 September 1988	15:00	Semifinals
Friday, 23 September 1988	9:42	Final B
Saturday, 24 September 1988	10:50	Final A

== Results ==
=== Quarterfinals ===
==== Quarterfinal 1 ====
Rank	Rowers	Coxswain	Nation	Time	Notes
1	Bernd Eichwurzel; Frank Klawonn; Bernd Niesecke; Karsten Schmeling	Hendrik Reiher	East Germany	6:00.75	Q
2	Roland Baar; Wolfgang Klapheck; Christoph Korte; Andreas Lütkefels	Martin Ruppel	West Germany	6:02.98	Q
3	Greg Johnston; George Keys; Chris White; Ian Wright	Andrew Bird	New Zealand	6:03.35	Q
4	Giuseppe Carando; Leonardo Massa; Antonio Maurogiovanni; Giovanni Miccoli	Dino Lucchetta	Italy	6:06.09	R
5	Adam Clift; Martin Cross; John Garrett; John Maxey	Vaughan Thomas	Great Britain	6:20.89	R

==== Quarterfinal 2 ====
Rank	Rowers	Coxswain	Nation	Time	Notes
1	Tom Darling; Chris Huntington; John Terwilliger; John Walters	Mark Zembsch	United States	6:08.36	Q
2	Milan Doleček; Petr Hlídek; Dušan Macháček; Michal Šubrt	Oldřich Hejdušek	Czechoslovakia	6:11.25	Q
3	Vladimir Banjanac; Zlatko Celent; Sead Marušić; Lazo Pivač	Dario Varga	Yugoslavia	6:12.33	Q
4	Agustín Alarcón; Baltasar Márquez; José Ramón Oyarzábal; Ibon Urbieta	Javier Viñolas	Spain	6:14.69	R
5	Harold Backer; John Houlding; Robert Marland; Brian Saunderson	Terry Paul	Canada	6:15.21	R

==== Quarterfinal 3 ====
Rank	Rowers	Coxswain	Nation	Time	Notes
1	Dimitrie Popescu; Valentin Robu; Ioan Snep; Vasile Tomoiagă	Marin Gheorghe	Romania	6:10.26	Q
2	Sigitas Kučinskas; Jonas Narmontas; Vladimir Romanishin; Igor Zotov	Sergey Titov	Soviet Union	6:16.53	Q
3	Marcel Hotz; Bruno Saile; Günter Schneider; Jörg Weitnauer	Martin Honegger	Switzerland	6:27.52	Q
4	Jeong Jae-won; Gang Man-gu; Lee Tae-hwa; Yang Gwang-jae	Park Seong-nae	South Korea	6:57.99	R

=== Repechage ===
Rank	Rowers	Coxswain	Nation	Time	Notes
1	Adam Clift; Martin Cross; John Garrett; John Maxey	Vaughan Thomas	Great Britain	6:31.11	Q
2	Giuseppe Carando; Leonardo Massa; Antonio Maurogiovanni; Giovanni Miccoli	Dino Lucchetta	Italy	6:32.14	Q
3	Harold Backer; John Houlding; Robert Marland; Brian Saunderson	Terry Paul	Canada	6:33.05	Q
4	Agustín Alarcón; Baltasar Márquez; José Ramón Oyarzábal; Ibon Urbieta	Javier Viñolas	Spain	6:34.36	
5	Jeong Jae-won; Gang Man-gu; Lee Tae-hwa; Yang Gwang-jae	Park Seong-nae	South Korea	7:19.22	

=== Semifinals ===
==== Semifinal 1 ====
Rank	Rowers	Coxswain	Nation	Time	Notes
1	Bernd Eichwurzel; Frank Klawonn; Bernd Niesecke; Karsten Schmeling	Hendrik Reiher	East Germany	6:07.91	QA
2	Dimitrie Popescu; Valentin Robu; Ioan Snep; Vasile Tomoiagă	Marin Gheorghe	Romania	6:09.86	QA
3	Greg Johnston; George Keys; Chris White; Ian Wright	Andrew Bird	New Zealand	6:10.41	QA
4	Giuseppe Carando; Leonardo Massa; Antonio Maurogiovanni; Giovanni Miccoli	Dino Lucchetta	Italy	6:15.93	QB
5	Milan Doleček; Petr Hlídek; Dušan Macháček; Michal Šubrt	Oldřich Hejdušek	Czechoslovakia	6:20.42	QB
6	Marcel Hotz; Bruno Saile; Günter Schneider; Jörg Weitnauer	Martin Honegger	Switzerland	7:55.92	QB

==== Semifinal 2 ====
Rank	Rowers	Coxswain	Nation	Time	Notes
1	Adam Clift; Martin Cross; John Garrett; John Maxey	Vaughan Thomas	Great Britain	6:15.22	QA
2	Tom Darling; Chris Huntington; John Terwilliger; John Walters	Mark Zembsch	United States	6:15.30	QA
3	Vladimir Banjanac; Zlatko Celent; Sead Marušić; Lazo Pivač	Dario Varga	Yugoslavia	6:15.72	QA
4	Roland Baar; Wolfgang Klapheck; Christoph Korte; Andreas Lütkefels	Martin Ruppel	West Germany	6:15.87	QB
5	Sigitas Kučinskas; Jonas Narmontas; Vladimir Romanishin; Igor Zotov	Sergey Titov	Soviet Union	6:16.69	QB
6	Harold Backer; John Houlding; Robert Marland; Brian Saunderson	Terry Paul	Canada	6:17.36	QB

=== Finals ===
==== Final B ====
Rank	Rowers	Coxswain	Nation	Time
7	Roland Baar; Wolfgang Klapheck; Christoph Korte; Andreas Lütkefels	Martin Ruppel	West Germany	6:42.65
8	Milan Doleček; Petr Hlídek; Dušan Macháček; Michal Šubrt	Oldřich Hejdušek	Czechoslovakia	6:43.64
9	Harold Backer; John Houlding; Robert Marland; Brian Saunderson	Terry Paul	Canada	6:44.95
10	Giuseppe Carando; Leonardo Massa; Antonio Maurogiovanni; Giovanni Miccoli	Dino Lucchetta	Italy	6:45.39
—	Marcel Hotz; Bruno Saile; Günter Schneider; Jörg Weitnauer	Martin Honegger	Switzerland	DNS
—	Sigitas Kučinskas; Jonas Narmontas; Vladimir Romanishin; Igor Zotov	Sergey Titov	Soviet Union	DNS

==== Final A ====
Rank	Rowers	Coxswain	Nation	Time
1st place, gold medalist(s)	Bernd Eichwurzel; Frank Klawonn; Bernd Niesecke; Karsten Schmeling	Hendrik Reiher	East Germany	6:10.74
2nd place, silver medalist(s)	Dimitrie Popescu; Valentin Robu; Ioan Snep; Vasile Tomoiagă	Ladislau Lovrenschi	Romania	6:13.58
3rd place, bronze medalist(s)	Greg Johnston; George Keys; Chris White; Ian Wright	Andrew Bird	New Zealand	6:15.78
4	Adam Clift; Martin Cross; John Garrett; John Maxey	Vaughan Thomas	Great Britain	6:18.08
5	Tom Darling; Chris Huntington; John Terwilliger; John Walters	Mark Zembsch	United States	6:18.47
6	Vladimir Banjanac; Zlatko Celent; Sead Marušić; Lazo Pivač	Dario Varga	Yugoslavia	6:23.28

== Final classification ==
Rank	Rowers	Nation
1st place, gold medalist(s)	Bernd Niesecke; Hendrik Reiher; Karsten Schmeling; Bernd Eichwurzel; Frank Klawonn	East Germany
2nd place, silver medalist(s)	Dimitrie Popescu; Ioan Snep; Vasile Tomoiagă; Ladislau Lovrenschi; Valentin Robu	Romania
3rd place, bronze medalist(s)	Chris White; Ian Wright; Andrew Bird; Greg Johnston; George Keys	New Zealand
4	Adam Clift; John Maxey; John Garrett; Martin Cross; Vaughan Thomas	Great Britain
5	John Terwilliger; Chris Huntington; Tom Darling; John Walters; Mark Zembsch	United States
6	Sead Marušić; Lazo Pivač; Zlatko Celent; Vladimir Banjanac; Dario Varga	Yugoslavia
7	Roland Baar; Wolfgang Klapheck; Christoph Korte; Andreas Lütkefels; Martin Ruppel	West Germany
8	Milan Doleček; Oldřich Hejdušek; Petr Hlídek; Dušan Macháček; Michal Šubrt	Czechoslovakia
9	Harold Backer; John Houlding; Robert Marland; Terry Paul; Brian Saunderson	Canada
10	Giuseppe Carando; Leonardo Massa; Antonio Maurogiovanni; Giovanni Miccoli; Dino Lucchetta	Italy
11	Martin Honegger; Marcel Hotz; Bruno Saile; Günter Schneider; Jörg Weitnauer	Switzerland
11	Sigitas Kučinskas; Jonas Narmontas; Vladimir Romanishin; Sergey Titov; Igor Zotov	Soviet Union
13	Agustín Alarcón; Baltasar Márquez; José Ramón Oyarzábal; Ibon Urbieta; Javier Viñolas	Spain
14	Jeong Jae-won; Gang Man-gu; Lee Tae-hwa; Park Seong-nae; Yang Gwang-jae	South Korea
