= Rowing at the 1993 Mediterranean Games =

Rowing competition

The Rowing Competition at the 1993 Mediterranean Games was held in Languedoc-Roussillon, France.

== Medalists ==
Event	Gold	Silver	Bronze
Single sculls	Giovanni Calabrese (ITA)	Vincent Lepvraud (FRA)	Murat Türker (TUR)
Double sculls	France (FRA); Samuel Barathay; Yves Lamarque	Spain (ESP); José Antonio Merín; Melquiades Verduras	Italy (ITA); Riccardo Nannipieri; Michele Quercioli
Quadruple sculls	Italy (ITA); Gianluca Farina; Massimo Paradiso; Alessandro Corona; Rossano Galtarossa	France (FRA); Fabrice LeClerc; Frédéric Kowal; Ikhlef Ben Okba; Luc Cattaneo	Spain (ESP); Bruno López; Juan Carlos Saez; Melquiades Verduras; José Antonio Merín
Coxless pairs	France (FRA); Marc Lanoy; Vincent Maliszewski	Slovenia (SLO); Iztok Čop; Denis Žvegelj	Croatia (CRO); Zlatko Bužina; Marko Perinović
Coxed pairs	France (FRA); Jean-Paul Vergne; Yannick Schulte; Jean-Pierre Huguet-Balent	Italy (ITA); Carmine Abbagnale; Giuseppe Abbagnale; Giuseppe Di Capua	Croatia (CRO); Tihomir Franković; Igor Boraska; Zoran Adamović
Coxless fours	France (FRA); Jean-Christophe Rolland; Michel Andrieux; Philippe Lot; Daniel Fauché	Italy (ITA); Carmine La Mura; Riccardo Dei Rossi; Raffaello Leonardo; Valter Molea	Croatia (CRO); Igor Velimirović; Sead Marušić; Ninoslav Saraga; Marko Banović

== Medal table ==
Rank	Nation	Gold	Silver	Bronze	Total
1	France (FRA)	4	2	0	6
2	Italy (ITA)	2	2	1	5
3	Spain (ESP)	0	1	1	2
4	Slovenia (SLO)	0	1	0	1
5	Croatia (CRO)	0	0	3	3
6	Turkey (TUR)	0	0	1	1
Totals (6 entries)		6	6	6	18
