= Croatia at the 1996 Summer Olympics =

- IOC code: CRO
- NOC: Croatian Olympic Committee
- Website: www.hoo.hr (in Croatian and English)

in Atlanta
- Competitors: 84 (75 men and 9 women) in 14 sports
- Flag bearer: Perica Bukić
- Medals Ranked 45th: Gold 1 Silver 1 Bronze 0 Total 2

Summer Olympics appearances (overview)
- 1992; 1996; 2000; 2004; 2008; 2012; 2016; 2020; 2024

Other related appearances
- Austria (1900); Yugoslavia (1920–1988)

Croatia competed at the 1996 Summer Olympics in Atlanta, United States.

== Medalists ==
Medal	Name	Sport	Event
Gold	Patrik Ćavar; Slavko Goluža; Božidar Jović; Nenad Kljaić; Venio Losert; Valter Matošević; Alvaro Načinović; Goran Perkovac; Iztok Puc; Zlatko Saračević; Irfan Smajlagić; Bruno Gudelj; Zoran Mikulić; Vladimir Jelčić; Valner Franković; Vladimir Šuster	Handball	Men's Team Competition
Silver	Maro Balić; Damir Glavan; Igor Hinić; Vjekoslav Kobešćak; Joško Kreković; Ognjen Kržić; Siniša Školneković; Ratko Štritof; Tino Vegar; Renato Vrbičić; Zdeslav Vrdoljak; Perica Bukić; Dubravko Šimenc	Water polo	Men's Team Competition

== Athletics ==
Men
Track & road events

Athlete	Event	Heat		Quarterfinal		Semifinal		Final	
Athlete	Event	Result	Rank	Result	Rank	Result	Rank	Result	Rank
Branko Zorko	1500 m	3:37.35	6 Q	—N/a		3:35.14	14	Did not advance	

Field events

Athlete	Event	Qualification		Final	
Athlete	Event	Distance	Position	Distance	Position
Siniša Ergotić	Long jump	NM		Did not advance	
Dragan Mustapić	Discus throw	57.94	27	Did not advance	

== Basketball ==
=== Men's tournament ===
Roster

- Vladan Alanović
- Arijan Komazec
- Toni Kukoč
- Davor Marcelić
- Damir Mulaomerović
- Veljko Mršić
- Velimir Perasović
- Dino Rađa
- Slaven Rimac
- Josip Vranković
- Stojko Vranković
- Žan Tabak

Preliminary round

The four best teams from each group advanced to the quarterfinal round.

Pos	Team	Pld	W	L	PF	PA	PD	Pts	Qualification
1	United States (H)	5	5	0	522	345	+177	10	Quarterfinals
2	Lithuania	5	3	2	427	354	+73	8 (Note: Head-to-head record: Lithuania 1–0 Croatia)	Quarterfinals
3	Croatia	5	3	2	422	386	+36	8	Quarterfinals
4	China	5	2	3	360	502	−142	7 (Note: Head-to-head record: China 1–0 Argentina)	Quarterfinals
5	Argentina	5	2	3	351	396	−45	7	9th place playoff
6	Angola	5	0	5	280	379	−99	5	11th place playoff

Source: FIBA archive
Rules for classification: 1) points; 2) head-to-head points; 3) head-to-head goal average; 4) head-to-head number of points scored.
(H) Hosts
Notes:

20 July 1996

Report

Lithuania	83–81 (OT)	Croatia
Scoring by half: 37–31, 29–35 Overtime: 6–6, 11–9
Pts: Sabonis 20; Rebs: Sabonis 14; Asts: Vaišvila 6		Pts: Kukoč 33; Rebs: Rađa 12; Asts: Kukoč 6

Atlanta
Referees: Miguel Betancor Leon (ESP), Jose Lapaix Guance (DOM)

22 July 1996

Report

Croatia	109–78	China
Scoring by half: 56–44, 53–34
Pts: Komazec 36; Rebs: Vranković 9 Asts: Kukoč 12		Pts: Wang, Zheng 15; Rebs: Gong 8 Asts: Sun 6

Atlanta
Referees: Jose Pelissari (BRA), Kim Chul-Hwan (KOR)

24 July 1996

Report

Croatia	71–48	Angola
Scoring by half: 26–23, 45–25
Pts: Rađa 20; Rebs: Rađa 9 Asts: Kukoč 6		Pts: Â. Victoriano, Dias 10; Rebs: Dias 12; Asts: Avô 2

Atlanta
Referees: Hidetoshi Ishida (JPN), Serguei Boulanov (RUS)

26 July 1996

Report

Argentina	75–90	Croatia
Scoring by half: 29–43, 46–47
Pts: Espil 17; Rebs: Osella 6 Asts: Milanesio 5		Pts: Komazec 28; Rebs: Kukoč 8 Asts: Komazec, Mulaomerović 3

Atlanta
Referees: Jose Piovesan Neto (BRA), Pascal Noel Dorizon (FRA)

28 July 1996

Report

Croatia	71–102	United States
Scoring by half: 38–57, 33–45
Pts: Tabak 19; Rebs: Tabak 7 Asts: Kukoč 10		Pts: Richmond 16; Rebs: Barkley 12; Asts: Payton 7

Atlanta
Referees: Robert Barnett (AUS), Carl Jungebrand (FIN)

Quarterfinals

30 July 1996
20:00

Report

Australia	73–71	Croatia
Scoring by half: 41–33, 32–38
Pts: Gaze 26; Rebs: Heal, Bradtke 5 Asts: Heal 7		Pts: Alanović 18; Rebs: Vranković 11; Asts: Kukoč 8

Atlanta
Referees: Wieslaw Zych (POL), Juan Figueroa (PUR)

5th–8th place

1 August 1996
12:00

Report

Brazil	80–74	Croatia
Scoring by half: 39–27, 41–47
Pts: Schmidt 32; Rebs: dos Santos, Janjao 7 Asts: Ratto 7		Pts: Tabak 18; Rebs: Tabak 8 Asts: Kukoč 5

Atlanta
Referees: Romualdas Brazauskas (LTU), Jose Reyes Ronfini (MEX)

7th–8th place

2 August 1996
20:00

Report

China	85–99	Croatia
Scoring by half: 39–49, 46–50
Pts: Hu 22; Rebs: Gong 9 Asts: Li, Sun 5		Pts: Kukoč 26; Rebs: Kukoč 10; Asts: Kukoč 8

Atlanta
Referees: Robert Barnett (AUS), Raul Chaves Sagel (ARG)

== Boxing ==
Men

Athlete	Event	1 Round	2 Round	3 Round	Quarterfinals	Semifinals	Final	
Athlete	Event	Opposition Result	Opposition Result	Opposition Result	Opposition Result	Opposition Result	Opposition Result	Rank
Stipe Drviš	Light-Heavyweight	John Douglas (GUY); W RSC-2	Timur Ibragimov (UZB); W 10-9	—N/a	Lee Seung-Bae (KOR); L 11-14	Did not advance		5

== Canoeing ==
=== Slalom ===
Athlete	Event	Preliminary				Final	
Athlete	Event	Run 1	Rank	Run 2	Rank	Best	Rank
Danko Herceg	Men's C-1	468.07	30	275.94	28	275.94	29
Andrej Glucks	Men's K-1	155.75	17	150.12	10	150.12	16

=== Sprint ===
Men

Athlete	Event	Heats		Repechages		Semifinals		Final	
Athlete	Event	Time	Rank	Time	Rank	Time	Rank	Time	Rank
Dražen Funtak	C-1 500 m	2:00.076	6 Q	—N/a		1:58.570	5	Did not advance	16
Ivan Šabjan	C-1 1000 m	4:28.375	3 Q	—N/a		4:13.901	1 Q	4:04.066	8
Dražen Funtak; Ivan Šabjan	C-2 500 m	1:47.235	4 Q	1:50.473	4 Q	1:44.770	5	Did not advance	12
Dražen Funtak; Ivan Šabjan	C-2 1000 m	4:02.831	3 Q	—N/a		3:48.677	4	Did not advance	11

== Gymnastics ==
=== Artistic ===
Men

Athlete	Event	Qualification								Final							
Athlete	Event	Apparatus						Total	Rank	Apparatus						Total	Rank
Athlete	Event	F	PH	R	V	PB	HB	Total	Rank	F	PH	R	V	PB	HB	Total	Rank
Aleksej Demjanov	Individual all-around	18.700	16.550	19.075	18.675	18.437	17.325	108.762	57	did not advance							

== Handball ==
=== Group A ===
Team	Pld	W	D	L	GF	GA	GD	Points
Sweden	5	5	0	0	131	94	+37	10
Croatia	5	4	0	1	132	122	+10	8
Russia	5	3	0	2	137	106	+31	6
Switzerland	5	2	0	3	126	115	+11	4
United States	5	1	0	4	111	142	−31	2
Kuwait	5	0	0	5	100	158	−58	0

=== Semifinals ===
August 2; ~20:30	France	20–24	Croatia	Referees: Hogsnes/Oeie (NOR)
August 2; ~20:30	Stoecklin 8	(8-12)	Cavar 8	Referees: Hogsnes/Oeie (NOR)

=== Final ===
August 4; ~16:30	Sweden	26–27	Croatia	Referees: Gallego Santos/Lamas Perez (ESP)
August 4; ~16:30	Thorsson 8	(11-16)	Perkovac, Smajlagic, Jovic 6	Referees: Gallego Santos/Lamas Perez (ESP)

=== Roster ===
Gold medal

- Patrik Ćavar
- Slavko Goluža
- Božidar Jović
- Nenad Kljaić
- Venio Losert
- Valter Matošević
- Alvaro Načinović
- Goran Perkovac
- Iztok Puc
- Zlatko Saračević
- Irfan Smajlagić
- Bruno Gudelj
- Zoran Mikulić
- Vladimir Jelčić
- Valner Franković
- Vladimir Šujster

== Rowing ==
Men

Athlete	Event	Heats		Repechage		Semifinals C-D		Semifinals		Final	
Athlete	Event	Time	Rank	Time	Rank	Time	Rank	Time	Rank	Time	Rank
Marko Banović; Ninoslav Saraga	Coxless pair	6:54.05	2 R	7:05.81	1 Q	BYE		6:55.89	3 Q	6:30.48	6
Hrvoje Telišman; Danijel Bajlo	Double sculls	6:26.84	6 R	6:48.02	2 Q	BYE		7:03.53	6	6:26.84	12
Igor Boraska; Tihomir Franković; Sead Marušić; Siniša Skelin	Coxless four	6:17.42	2 Q	—N/a				6:12.40	4 FB	5:54.58	7

== Sailing ==
Men

Athlete	Event	Race											Net points	Final rank
Athlete	Event	1	2	3	4	5	6	7	8	9	10	11	Net points	Final rank
Karlo Kuret	Finn	~~DSQ~~	11	2	19	12	23	~~24~~	18	9	15	—N/a	109.0	19
Ivan Kuret; Marko Mišura	470	3	15	15	~~21~~	11	12	~~31~~	22	9	14	16	116.0	13

== Shooting ==
Men

Athlete	Event	Qualification		Final	
Athlete	Event	Score	Rank	Score	Rank
Roman Špirelja	25 m rapid fire pistol	582	16	Did not advance	
Roman Špirelja	10 m air rifle	570	43	Did not advance	

Women

Athlete	Event	Qualification		Final	
Athlete	Event	Score	Rank	Score	Rank
Mladenka Malenica	50 m rifle three positions	572	28	Did not advance	
Mladenka Malenica	10 m air rifle	390	20	Did not advance	
Mirela Skoko Ćelić	25 m pistol	561	36	Did not advance	
Mirela Skoko Ćelić	10 m air pistol	381	10	Did not advance	
Suzana Skoko	50 m rifle three positions	578	12	Did not advance	
Suzana Skoko	10 m air rifle	389	25	Did not advance	

== Swimming ==
Men

Athlete	Event	Heat		Final B		Final	
Athlete	Event	Time	Rank	Time	Rank	Time	Rank
Krešimir Čač	200 metre individual medley	2:06.97	25	Did not advance			
Krešimir Čač	400 metre individual medley	4:34.02	23	Did not advance			
Dominik Galić	200 metre butterfly	2:01.17	22	Did not advance			
Marijan Kanjer	100 metre freestyle	51.76	41	Did not advance			
Tomislav Karlo	100 metre backstroke	57.89	36	Did not advance			
Miloš Milošević	100 metre butterfly	54.62	23	Did not advance			
Marko Strahija	200 metre backstroke	2:01.95	14 Q	2:01.84	11	Did not advance	
Miroslav Vučetić	200 metre freestyle	1:51.26	19	Did not advance			
Miroslav Vučetić	400 metre freestyle	3:59.20	22	Did not advance			
Miroslav Vučetić; Miloš Milošević; Alen Lončar; Marijan Kanjer	4 × 100 m freestyle relay	3:26.02	14	Did not advance			
Gordan Kožulj; Miroslav Vučetić; Marijan Kanjer; Marko Strahija	4 × 200 m freestyle relay	7:43.69	13	Did not advance			
Tomislav Karlo; Krešimir Čač; Miloš Milošević; Miroslav Vučetić	4 × 100 m medley relay	3:50.09	16	Did not advance			

Women

Athlete	Event	Heat		Final B		Final	
Athlete	Event	Time	Rank	Time	Rank	Time	Rank
Tinka Dančević	200 metre butterfly	2:20.74	31	Did not advance			
Gabrijela Ujčić	50 metre freestyle	27.63	46	Did not advance			
Gabrijela Ujčić	100 metre freestyle	59.92	45	Did not advance			
Gabrijela Ujčić	100 metre butterfly	1:06.85	42	Did not advance			

== Table tennis ==
Men

Athlete	Event	Group round				Round of 16	Quarterfinals	Semifinals	Bronze medal	Final	
Athlete	Event	Opposition Result	Opposition Result	Opposition Result	Rank	Opposition Result	Opposition Result	Opposition Result	Opposition Result	Opposition Result	Rank
Zoran Primorac	Men's singles	Werner Schlager (AUT); W 2 – 0	Zoltán Bátorfi (HUN); W 2 – 1	Hamad Al-Hammadi (QAT); W 2 – 0	1 Q	Jean-Michel Saive (BEL); L 0 – 2	Did not advance				
Zoran Primorac; Damir Atiković	Men's doubles	Lü Lin; Wang Tao (CHN); L 0 – 2	Ding Yi; Qian Qianli (AUT); L 0 – 2	Paul Langley; Russ Lavale (AUS); W 2 – 1	3	Did not advance					

Women

Athlete	Event	Group round				Round of 16	Quarterfinals	Semifinals	Bronze medal	Final	
Athlete	Event	Opposition Result	Opposition Result	Opposition Result	Rank	Opposition Result	Opposition Result	Opposition Result	Opposition Result	Opposition Result	Rank
Tamara Boroš	Women's singles	Nicole Struse (GER); L 0 – 2	Taeko Todo (JPN); L 0 – 2	Sonia Touati (TUN); W 2 – 0	3	Did not advance					
Eldijana Aganović; Tamara Boroš	Women's doubles	Kim Moo-Kyo; Park Kyung-Ae (KOR); L 0 – 2	Fumiyo Kaizu; Rika Sato (JPN); L 0 – 2	Monica Doti; Lyanne Kosaka (BRA); W 2 – 0	3	Did not advance					

== Tennis ==
Men

Athlete	Event	Round of 64	Round of 32	Round of 16	Quarterfinals	Semifinals	Final	
Athlete	Event	Opposition Score	Opposition Score	Opposition Score	Opposition Score	Opposition Score	Opposition Score	Rank
Goran Ivanišević	Singles	Marcos Ondruska (RSA); L 2:6, 4:6	Did not advance					
Goran Ivanišević; Saša Hiršzon	Doubles	—N/a	Emanuel Couto; Bernardo Mota (POR); W 7:6, 7:6	Mark Knowles; Roger Smith (BAH); W 7:6, 6:3	Marc-Kevin Goellner; David Prinosil (GER); L 2:6, 3:6	Did not advance		5

Women

Athlete	Event	Round of 64	Round of 32	Round of 16	Quarterfinals	Semifinals	Final	
Athlete	Event	Opposition Score	Opposition Score	Opposition Score	Opposition Score	Opposition Score	Opposition Score	Rank
Iva Majoli	Singles	Nicole Bradtke (AUS); W 3-6, 6-3, 6-4	Virginia Ruano-Pascual (ESP); W 7-5, 6-3	Karina Habšudová (SVK); W 6-4, 3-6, 6-4	Lindsay Davenport (USA); L 5-7, 3-6	Did not advance		5
Iva Majoli; Maja Murić	Doubles	—N/a	Silvia Farina; Laura Golarsa (ITA); W 7:6, 4-6, 9-7	Conchita Martínez; Arantxa Sánchez Vicario (ESP); L 2:6, 1-6	Did not advance			

== Water polo ==
=== Men's team competition ===
==== Group B ====
	Team	Points	G	W	D	L	GF	GA	Diff
1.	Italy	10	5	5	0	0	48	38	+10
2.	United States	8	5	4	0	1	45	37	+8
3.	Croatia	6	5	3	0	2	51	39	+12
4.	Greece	4	5	2	0	3	37	38	–1
5.	Romania	1	5	0	1	4	31	45	–14
6.	Ukraine	1	5	0	1	4	33	48	–15

- Saturday July 20, 1996

Croatia	8 – 5	Greece

- Sunday July 21, 1996

Croatia	11 – 6	Romania

- Monday July 22, 1996

Italy	10 – 8	Croatia

- Tuesday July 23, 1996

Croatia	16 – 8	Ukraine

- Wednesday July 24, 1996

United States	10 – 8	Croatia

=== Quarterfinals ===
- Friday July 26, 1996

Yugoslavia	6 – 8	Croatia

=== Semifinals ===
- Saturday July 27, 1996

Croatia	7 – 6	Italy

=== Finals ===
- Sunday July 28, 1996 — Silver medal

Spain	7 – 5	Croatia

=== Roster ===
- Maro Balić
- Perica Bukić
- Damir Glavan
- Igor Hinić
- Vjekoslav Kobešćak
- Joško Kreković
- Ognjen Kržić
- Dubravko Šimenc
- Siniša Školneković
- Ratko Štritof
- Renato Vrbičić
- Zdeslav Vrdoljak
- Tino Vegar

== Wrestling ==
Men's Greco-Roman

Athlete	Event	Round 1	Round 2	Round 3	Round 4	Round 5	Round 6	Final / BM	
Athlete	Event	Opposition Result	Opposition Result	Opposition Result	Opposition Result	Opposition Result	Opposition Result	Opposition Result	Rank
Stipe Damjanović	−100 kg	Mohamed Basri (MAR); W 6-0	Mikael Ljungberg (SWE); L 0-5	Urs Bürgler (SUI); W 6-3	Teymuraz Edisherashvili (RUS); L 0-5	Did not advance			10
