= Croatia at the 1992 Summer Olympics =

- IOC code: CRO
- NOC: Croatian Olympic Committee

in Barcelona
- Competitors: 39 (36 men and 3 women) in 12 sports
- Flag bearer: Goran Ivanišević
- Medals Ranked 44th: Gold 0 Silver 1 Bronze 2 Total 3

Summer Olympics appearances (overview)
- 1992; 1996; 2000; 2004; 2008; 2012; 2016; 2020; 2024

Other related appearances
- Austria (1900); Yugoslavia (1920–1988)

Croatia competed in the Summer Olympic Games for the first time as an independent nation at the 1992 Summer Olympics in Barcelona, Spain. Previously, Croatian athletes had competed for Yugoslavia at the Olympic Games.

== Medalists ==
Medal	Name	Sport	Event	Date
Silver	Croatia men's national basketball team: Dražen Petrović; Velimir Perasović; Danko Cvjetičanin; Toni Kukoč; Vladan Alanović; Žan Tabak; Stojko Vranković; Alan Gregov; Franjo Arapović; Arijan Komazec; Aramis Naglić; Dino Rađa	Basketball	Men's tournament	8 August
Bronze	Goran Ivanišević; Goran Prpić	Tennis	Men's doubles	5 August
Bronze	Goran Ivanišević	Tennis	Men's singles	6 August

== Competitors ==
The following is the list of number of competitors in the Games.

Sport	Men	Women	Total
Athletics	2	0	2
Basketball	12	0	12
Boxing	1	–	1
Canoeing	4	0	4
Equestrian	1	0	1
Rowing	7	0	7
Sailing	3	0	3
Shooting	1	3	4
Table tennis	2	0	2
Tennis	2	0	2
Wrestling	1	–	1
Total	36	3	39

== Athletics ==
Men
Track & road events

Athlete	Event	Heat		Quarterfinal		Semifinal		Final	
Athlete	Event	Result	Rank	Result	Rank	Result	Rank	Result	Rank
Branko Zorko	1500 m	3:44.47	3 Q	—N/a		3:39.71	7	Did not advance	

Field events

Athlete	Event	Qualification		Final	
Athlete	Event	Distance	Position	Distance	Position
Ivan Mustapić	Javelin throw	77.50	17	Did not advance	

== Basketball ==
=== Men's team competition ===
==== Preliminary round ====
The top four places in each of the preliminary round groups advanced to the eight team, single-elimination knockout stage, where Group A teams would meet Group B teams.

==== Group A ====
Qualified for the quarterfinals

Team	W	L	PF	PA	PD	Pts	Tie
United States	5	0	579	350	+229	10	
Croatia	4	1	423	400	+23	9	
Brazil	2	3	420	463	−43	7	1–0
Germany	2	3	369	432	−63	7	0–1
Angola	1	4	324	392	−68	6	1–0
Spain	1	4	398	476	−78	6	0–1

July 26
22:30

Croatia	93–76	Brazil
Scoring by half: 55–40, 38–36

Palau Municipal d'Esports de Badalona, Barcelona

July 27
20:30

Croatia	70–103	United States
Scoring by half: 37–54, 33–49

Palau Municipal d'Esports de Badalona, Barcelona

July 29
22:30

Croatia	88–79	Spain
Scoring by half: 45–42, 43–37

Palau Municipal d'Esports de Badalona, Barcelona

July 31
20:30

Croatia	99–78	Germany
Scoring by half: 46–41, 53–37

Palau Municipal d'Esports de Badalona, Barcelona

August 2
11:30

Croatia	73–64	Angola
Scoring by half: 27–38, 46–26

Palau Municipal d'Esports de Badalona, Barcelona

==== Quarterfinals ====
August 4
14:30

Croatia	98–65	Australia
Scoring by half: 41–31, 57–34

Palau Municipal d'Esports de Badalona, Barcelona

==== Semifinals ====
August 6
16:30

Croatia	75–74	CIS
Scoring by half: 30–40, 45–34

Palau Municipal d'Esports de Badalona, Barcelona

==== Gold medal game ====
August 8
22:00

(silver) Croatia	85–117	United States (gold)
Scoring by half: 42-56, 43–61

Palau Municipal d'Esports de Badalona, Barcelona

=== Roster ===
- Vladan Alanović
- Franjo Arapović
- Danko Cvjetičanin
- Alan Gregov
- Arijan Komazec
- Toni Kukoč
- Aramis Naglić
- Velimir Perasović
- Dražen Petrović
- Dino Rađa
- Stojko Vranković
- Žan Tabak

== Boxing ==
Men

Athlete	Event	1 Round	2 Round	3 Round	Quarterfinals	Semifinals	Final
Athlete	Event	Opposition Result	Opposition Result	Opposition Result	Opposition Result	Opposition Result	Rank
Željko Mavrović	Heavyweight	Mark Hulstrom (DEN); W 8-2	Danell Nicholson (USA); L 6-9	Did not advance			

== Canoeing ==
=== Slalom ===
Athlete	Event	Preliminary				Final	
Athlete	Event	Run 1	Rank	Run 2	Rank	Best	Rank
Danko Herceg	Men's C-1	128.55	13	120.41	7	120.41	9
Stjepan Perestegi	Men's C-1	151.19	27	136.90	20	136.90	23

=== Sprint ===
Men

Athlete	Event	Heats		Repechages		Semifinals		Final	
Athlete	Event	Time	Rank	Time	Rank	Time	Rank	Time	Rank
Zvonimir Krznarić	K-1 500 m	1:46.46	5 Q	1:43.40	5	Did not advance			
Zvonimir Krznarić	K-1 1000 m	3:54.02	6 Q	3:36.77	5	Did not advance			
Vlado Poslek	C-1 1000 m	4:09.77	5 Q	4:05.86	4 Q	4:16.99	7	Did not advance	

== Equestrian ==
=== Jumping ===
Athlete	Horse	Event	Qualification								Final					
Athlete	Horse	Event	Round 1		Round 2		Round 3		Total		Round 1		Round 2		Total	
Athlete	Horse	Event	Score	Rank	Score	Rank	Score	Rank	Score	Rank	Penalties	Rank	Penalties	Rank	Penalties	Rank
Hermann Weiland	Dufy 2	Individual	30.50	56	21.50	65	DNF		52.00	72	Did not advance					

== Rowing ==
Men

Athlete	Event	Heats		Repechage		Semifinals C-D		Semifinals		Final	
Athlete	Event	Time	Rank	Time	Rank	Time	Rank	Time	Rank	Time	Rank
Marko Perinović; Zlatko Buzina	Coxless pair	6:14.37	1 Q	BYE				6:47.87	6 Q	6:37.57	10
Aleksandar Fabijanić; Marko Banović; Ninoslav Saraga; Sead Marušić; Goran Puljko	Coxed four	6:31.19	4 R	6:18.09	3 FB	—N/a				6:08.52	7

== Sailing ==
Men

Athlete	Event	Race							Net points	Final rank
Athlete	Event	1	2	3	4	5	6	7	Net points	Final rank
Karlo Kuret	Finn	22	19	14	20	16	~~23~~	10	137.0	22

Open

Athlete	Event	Race							Net points	Final rank
Athlete	Event	1	2	3	4	5	6	7	Net points	Final rank
Bojan Grego; Sebastijan Miknić	Flying Dutchman	~~22~~	22	14	21	5	DND	DND	145.0	22

== Shooting ==
Women

Athlete	Event	Qualification		Final	
Athlete	Event	Score	Rank	Score	Rank
Jasminka Francki	50 metre rifle three positions	578	12	Did not advance	
Jasminka Francki	10 metre air rifle	390	15	Did not advance	
Mirela Skoko	25 m pistol	578	8 Q	677	4
Mirela Skoko	10 m air pistol	380	11	Did not advance	
Suzana Skoko	50 metre rifle three positions	580	6 Q	678,7	5
Suzana Skoko	10 metre air rifle	388	23	Did not advance	

Open

Athlete	Event	Qualification		Semifinal		Final	
Athlete	Event	Score	Rank	Score	Rank	Score	Rank
Željko Vadić	Trap	139	33	Did not advance			

== Table tennis ==
Athlete	Event	Group stage				Round of 16	Quarterfinals	Semifinals	Final	
Athlete	Event	Opposition Result	Opposition Result	Opposition Result	Rank	Opposition Result	Opposition Result	Opposition Result	Opposition Result	Rank
Zoran Primorac	Men's singles	Yair Nathan (PER); W 2-0 (21:7, 21:8)	Jim Butler (USA); W 2-0 (21:16, 21:14)	Tomáš Janči (TCH); W 2-0 (21:18, 21:10	1 Q	Kim Taek-Soo (KOR); L 2-3 (21:19, 21:13, 20:22, 8:21,12:21)	Did not advance			
Zoran Primorac; Dragutin Šurbek	Men's doubles	Choi Gyong-Sob; Li Gun-Sang (PRK); W 2-0 (21:11, 21:18)	Lü Lin; Wang Tao (CHN); L 1-2 (21:16, 9:21, 9:21)	Yair Nathan; Walter Nathan (PER); W 2-0 (21:15, 21:1)	2	—N/a	Did not advance			

== Taekwondo ==
Taekwondo was a demonstration sport at the 1992 Summer Olympics.

Athlete	Event	Quarterfinals	Semifinals	Final / BM	
Athlete	Event	Opposition Result	Opposition Result	Opposition Result	Rank
Dragan Jurilj	Men's −76 kg	Al-Qaimi (KUW); L 2–3	Did not advance		
Miet Filipović	Women's −55 kg	Knol (MEX); L 2-6	Did not advance		

== Tennis ==
Men

Athlete	Event	Round of 64	Round of 32	Round of 16	Quarterfinals	Semifinals	Final	
Athlete	Event	Opposition Score	Opposition Score	Opposition Score	Opposition Score	Opposition Score	Opposition Score	Rank
Goran Ivanišević	Singles	Bernardo Mota (POR); W 6:2, 6:2, 6:7, 4:6, 6:3	Paul Haarhuis (NED); W 6:7, 6:2,1:6, 6:3, 6:2	Jakob Hlasek (SUI); W 3:6, 6:0, 4:6, 7:6, 9:7	Fabrice Santoro (FRA); W 6:7, 6:7, 6:4, 6:4, 8:6	Marc Rosset (SUI); L 3:6, 5:7, 2:6	Did not advance	3rd place, bronze medalist(s)
Goran Prpić	Singles	Kenneth Carlsen (DEN); W 6:4, 4:6, 6:3, 7:5	Andrei Cherkasov (EUN); L 4:6, 7:6, 4:6, 3:6	Did not advance				
Goran Ivanišević; Goran Prpić	Doubles	—N/a	Paul Haarhuis; Mark Koevermans (NED); W 2:6, 6:4, 6:2, 6:2	Suharyadi Suharyadi; Bonit Wiryawadi (INA); W 7:5, 6:2, 6:2	Ramesh Chrishnan; Leander Paes (IND); W 7:6, 5:7, 6:4, 6:3	Wayne Ferreira; Piet Norval (RSA); L 6:7, 6:3, 3:6, 6:2, 2:6	Did not advance	3rd place, bronze medalist(s)

== Wrestling ==
Men's Greco-Roman

Athlete	Event	Elimination Pool							Final round	
Athlete	Event	Round 1 Result	Round 2 Result	Round 3 Result	Round 4 Result	Round 5 Result	Round 6 Result	Rank	Final round Result	Rank
Stipe Damjanović	−100 kg	Ion Ieremciuc (ROU); L 0-7	Andrzej Wroński (POL); L 0-6	—N/a				6	Did not advance	
