= James Neil =

American rower (born 1968)

Personal information
- Full name: James Matthew Neil
- Born: May 15, 1968 (age 58) Buffalo, New York, U.S.
- Height: 6 ft 2 in (188 cm)
- Weight: 196 lb (89 kg)
Medal record
Men's rowing
Representing the United States
World Championships
Gold medal – first place	1999 St. Catharines	Coxed pair
Silver medal – second place	2000 Zagreb	Coxed four
Bronze medal – third place	1993 Račice	Coxless four
Pan American Games
Gold medal – first place	1995 Mar del Plata	Coxed four
Gold medal – first place	1999 Winnipeg	Eight

James Matthew Neil (born May 15, 1968) is an American rower who competed at the 1992 Summer Olympics in the men's coxed four. In a team with Teo Bielefeld, Sean Hall, Jack Rusher, and Tim Evans as cox, he came fourth.
