= Ruppel =

Ruppel is a German language surname. It stems from a reduced form of the male given name Ruprecht – and may refer to:

- Annina Ruppel (1980), German rowing coxswain
- Berthold Ruppel (died in 1494), first printer in Basel, Switzerland
- Ellen Ruppel Shell (1952), American journalist
- Martin Ruppel (1966), German rowing coxswain
- Richard Ruppel, American literary critic
- Robh Ruppel (1960), American artist

== See also ==
- Eduard Rüppell (1794–1884), German naturalist and explorer
