= Šubrt =

Šubrt (feminine Šubrtová) is a Czech surname, a Czechized version of the German surname Schubert. Notable people with the surname include:

- Michal Šubrt (born 1967), Czech rower
- Milada Šubrtová (1924–2011), Czech opera singer
- Miroslav Šubrt (1926–2012), Czech ice hockey executive
- Anna Šubrtová (born 2002), Czech footballer
- Natália Šubrtová, Slovak alpine skier
