= Łasicki =

Łasicki (feminine: Łasicka; plural: Łasiccy) is a Polish surname. Notable people with this surname include:

- Igor Łasicki (born 1995), Polish footballer
- Jan Łasicki (1534–1602), Polish historian and theologian
- Maciej Łasicki (1965–2025), Polish rower
