= Pivac =

Pivac, Pivač, Пивач is a surname. Notable people with the surname include:

- Lazo Pivač (born 1967), Serbian rower
- Wayne Pivac (born 1962), New Zealand rugby coach, coach of the Wales team
