= Viñolas =

Viñolas is a surname. Notable people with the surname include:

- Albert Ramos Viñolas (born 1988), Spanish tennis player
- Javier Viñolas (born 1971), Spanish rowing coxswain
