= Miccoli =

Miccoli is a surname. Notable people with the surname include:

- Fabrizio Miccoli (born 1979), Italian footballer
- Giovanni Miccoli (born 1963), Italian rower
- Giuseppe Miccoli (born 1961), Italian long-distance runner
