= John Walters (rower) =

American rower

Personal information
- Born: July 18, 1963 (age 63) Portland, Oregon, United States

Sport
- Sport: Rowing

John Walters (born July 18, 1963) is an American rower. He competed in the men's coxed four event at the 1988 Summer Olympics.
