= Günter Schneider =

Swiss rower

Personal information
- Nationality: Swiss
- Born: 23 September 1963 (age 61)

Sport
- Sport: Rowing

Günter Schneider (born 23 September 1963) is a Swiss rower. He competed in the men's coxed four event at the 1988 Summer Olympics.
