= Otávio Bandeira =

Brazilian rower

Personal information
- Full name: Otávio D'Ávila Bandeira
- Born: 4 June 1963 (age 61); Porto Alegre, Brazil

Sport
- Sport: Rowing

Otávio D'Ávila Bandeira (born 4 June 1963) is a Brazilian rower. He competed in the men's coxed four event at the 1992 Summer Olympics.
