= Mark Zembsch =

American rower

Personal information
- Full name: Mark Jeffrey Zembsch
- Born: February 19, 1959 (age 67) Castro Valley, California, U.S.

Sport
- Sport: Rowing

Mark Jeffrey Zembsch (born February 19, 1959) is an American rowing coxswain. He competed in the men's coxed four event at the 1988 Summer Olympics.
