= Christoph Korte =

German rower (born 1965)

Personal information
- Nationality: German
- Born: 28 December 1965 (age 59); Waltrop, West Germany

Sport
- Sport: Rowing

Christoph Korte (born 28 December 1965) is a German former rower and geochemist. He competed in the men's coxed four event at the 1988 Summer Olympics. At the World Cup in Tasmania, Australia in 1990, he won the championship in the class of men's 8+, and the year before (1989 in Slovenia) he won a bronze medal in the class 4+. In 1999 Korte earned his PhD in Geology from the Ruhr-University Bochum and is currently an Associate Professor in Geology at Copenhagen University. His research is focused on palaeoclimatology and geochemistry.
