= Andreas Lütkefels =

German rower (1964–2022)

Personal information
- Nationality: German
- Born: 19 June 1964; Münster, North Rhine-Westphalia, West Germany
- Died: 9 May 2022 (aged 57)

Sport
- Sport: Rowing

Andreas Lütkefels (19 June 1964 – 9 May 2022) was a German rower. He competed in the men's coxed four event at the 1988 Summer Olympics.
