= Cleber Leite =

Brazilian rower

Personal information
- Born: 13 May 1969; Rio de Janeiro, Brazil
- Died: 22 April 2017 (aged 47)

Sport
- Sport: Rowing

Cleber Leite (13 May 1969 – 22 April 2017) was a Brazilian rower. He competed in the men's coxed four event at the 1992 Summer Olympics.
