= José Augusto Loureiro Júnior =

Brazilian rower

Personal information
- Nationality: Brazilian
- Born: 30 September 1969 (age 55)

Sport
- Sport: Rowing

José Augusto Loureiro Júnior (born 30 September 1969) is a Brazilian rower. He competed in the men's coxed four event at the 1992 Summer Olympics.
