= José Ribeiro (rower) =

Brazilian rower

Personal information
- Full name: José Raimundo Guzmão Ribeiro
- Nationality: Brazilian
- Born: 29 July 1963 (age 61)

Sport
- Sport: Rowing

José Raimundo Guzmão Ribeiro (born 29 July 1963) is a Brazilian rower. He competed in the men's coxed four event at the 1992 Summer Olympics.
