= Wolfgang Klapheck =

German rower (born 1966)

Personal information
- Nationality: German
- Born: 9 July 1966 (age 58); Dorsten, Germany

Sport
- Sport: Rowing

Wolfgang Klapheck (born 9 July 1966) is a German former rower. He competed in the men's coxed four events at the 1988 Summer Olympics.
