= Baltasar Márquez =

Spanish rower (born 1967)

Personal information
- Nationality: Spanish
- Born: 7 February 1967 (age 59)

Sport
- Sport: Rowing

Baltasar Márquez (born 7 February 1967) is a Spanish rower. He competed in the men's coxed four event at the 1988 Summer Olympics.
