= Park Sung-lae =

South Korean rower (born 1964)

Personal information
- Nationality: South Korean
- Born: 31 March 1964 (age 61)

Sport
- Sport: Rowing

Park Sung-lae (Korean: 박성내; born 31 March 1964) is a South Korean rowing coxswain. He competed in the men's coxed four event at the 1988 Summer Olympics.
