= Leonardo Massa =

Italian rower

Personal information
- Nationality: Italian
- Born: 18 November 1967 (age 58) Naples, Italy

Sport
- Sport: Rowing
Medal record
Representing Italy
Summer Universiade
Gold medal – first place	1987 Zagreb	Eight

Leonardo Massa (born 18 November 1967) is an Italian rower. He competed in the men's coxed four event at the 1988 Summer Olympics.
