= Association of Franciscan Colleges and Universities =

The Association of Franciscan Colleges and Universities (AFCU) is an association of over 20 Franciscan colleges and universities and is located in Milwaukee, Wisconsin.

The group is varied, ranging from large and established universities, to junior colleges, to newer institutions. Most of the schools are located in what is now called the American Rust Belt, reflecting the activities of the Franciscan movement in the United States. Surprisingly, few Franciscan institutions are located in the Southwest, an area first settled by Franciscan missionaries.

== Member institutions ==
- Alvernia University, Reading, Pennsylvania
- Alverno College, Milwaukee, Wisconsin
- Briar Cliff University, Sioux City, Iowa
- Cardinal Stritch University, Milwaukee, Wisconsin; the largest Franciscan university in America and home of the Association.
- Felician University, Lodi, New Jersey
- Franciscan School of Theology, San Diego, California
- Franciscan University of Steubenville, Ohio
- Hilbert College, Hamburg, New York
- Lourdes University, Sylvania, Ohio
- Madonna University, Livonia, Michigan
- Marian University, Indianapolis, Indiana
- Neumann University, Aston, Pennsylvania
- Franciscan Missionaries of Our Lady University, Baton Rouge, Louisiana
- Quincy University, Quincy, Illinois
- St. Bonaventure University, Olean, New York
- Siena University, Loudonville, New York
- St. Francis College, Brooklyn, New York
- Saint Francis University, Loretto, Pennsylvania
- University of St. Francis, Joliet, Illinois
- University of Saint Francis, Fort Wayne, Indiana
- Villa Maria College, Buffalo, New York
- Viterbo University, La Crosse, Wisconsin
- The Franciscan Institute, Olean, New York
