= Alexandre Fernandes =

Brazilian rowing cox

Personal information
- Full name: Alexandre Monteiro Dias Fernandes
- Born: 17 April 1967 (age 59) Rio de Janeiro, Brazil

Sport
- Sport: Rowing
Medal record
Representing Brazil
Pan American Games
Bronze medal – third place	1991 Havana	Coxed pairs

Alexandre Monteiro Dias Fernandes (born 17 April 1967), also known as Xoxô, is a Brazilian rowing coxswain and rowing coach. He competed in the men's coxed four event at the 1992 Summer Olympics.
