= Iztok Puc =

Slovenian and Croatian handball player (1966-2011)

Personal information
- Born: 14 September 1966 Slovenj Gradec, SR Slovenia, Yugoslavia
- Died: 20 October 2011 (aged 45) San Diego, California, U.S.
- Height: 1.96 m (6 ft 5 in)

Sport
- Sport: Handball
- Position: Left back

Youth career
- Years: Team
- 19??–1985: Šoštanj

Senior clubs
- Years: Team
- 1985–1990: Borac Banja Luka
- 1990–1994: Zagreb
- 1994–1999: Celje
- 1999–2002: Prule 67
National team
Years	Team	Apps	(Gls)
1988–1991	Yugoslavia	82	(191)
1991–1998	Croatia	65	(325)
1998–2000	Slovenia	34	(120)
Medal record
Representing Yugoslavia
Olympic Games
Bronze medal – third place	1988 Seoul	Team
Junior World Championship
Gold medal – first place	1987 Yugoslavia	Team
Representing Croatia
Olympic Games
Gold medal – first place	1996 Atlanta	Team
World Championship
Silver medal – second place	1995 Iceland	Team
European Championship
Bronze medal – third place	1994 Portugal	Team
Mediterranean Games
Gold medal – first place	1993 Languedoc-Roussillon	Team

Iztok Puc (14 September 1966 – 20 October 2011) was a Croatian-Slovenian handball player, who was one of the world's top players of the 1980s and 1990s. During his career he played professionally for Borac Banja Luka, Zagreb, Celje and Prule 67. He won a total of 18 domestic trophies. He has won the elite EHF Champions League in 1992 and 1993, both times with Zagreb. He is one of very few handball players who represented three different countries at the Summer Olympics (Yugoslavia, Croatia and Slovenia), winning bronze with Yugoslavia in 1988 and gold with Croatia in 1996. In 2009, he was named the best overall player in the history of Slovenian handball. After his death an award named in his honour was introduced and is awarded annually to the most promising young handball players in Slovenia and Croatia, given alternately one year to Slovenian and another year to Croatian player.

== Early life ==
Puc was born in Slovenj Gradec, SR Slovenia, SFR Yugoslavia on 14 September 1966. During his youth he lived in Šoštanj with his mother and without his father, whom he met for the first time at the age of 25. While Puc was in elementary school, gym teacher Miro Požun, who was aware of the situation at Puc's home, took young Puc under his wing and became his mentor. Požun, who eventually became one of the best coaches in history of Slovenian handball, was the first to notice Puc's talent and introduced him to the local handball club RK Šoštanj, which he also coached. There, Puc became the most promising young player of Yugoslav handball.

== Club career ==
Puc was first noticed by RK Borac in 1983 when their goalkeeper, Yugoslav international Zlatan Arnautović, spotted him and reported his findings to the club officials. He was then tracked by the club and their scouting service and a few years later the young promising player was given an offer to join their club. Abas Arslanagić, the coach of Borac, which was one of the top Yugoslav clubs at the time, wanted the young teenager to join his team immediately, however, Puc was persuaded by Miro Požun to finish high school first and complete at least some form of education. Puc listened to his mentor, finished high school one year later and finally joined Borac in 1985 where he signed his first professional contract. Upon his arrival in Banja Luka, he immediately became the best player of the team and the best goalscorer of the entire league. Although he never won any major domestic honours with Borac, he is considered as one of the best players in the club's history.

He later played for RK Zagreb from Croatia, and Celje and Prule 67 from Slovenia. During his career he won a total of 18 domestic trophies and was a member of the Zagreb squad which won the elite EHF Champions League in 1992 and 1993. He is most remembered for the game-winning goal in the 1993 Champions League final where he scored in the final seconds of the game. He has also won three Croatian league and three Croatian cup titles. His longest spell was with Celje, where he played for five years during which time he won five Slovenian league and five Slovenian cup titles and played in the EHF Champions League semi-final three times in a row. Miro Požun was the head coach of Celje during the 1994–95 season with whom Puc won his first Slovenian league and cup title. He made a total of 136 appearances for Celje, scoring 630 goals in the process. Puc last played for Prule 67 where he won both domestic titles, league and cup, in the 2001–02 season and appeared in another Champions league semi-final one year later.

== International career ==
His first taste of international success came at the 1987 Junior World Championship when Yugoslavia won gold, and Puc was noticed as the most prominent player of the winning team. Puc also captained his side during that tournament. One year later he won a bronze medal with the Yugoslav senior team at the 1988 Summer Olympics in Seoul. He played his last game for Yugoslavia at the 1990 World Championship where his team finished fourth. With 97 appearances, he is the third most capped Slovenian player in history of the Yugoslav national team.

Following his move to RK Zagreb in 1990 and the breakup of Yugoslavia in 1991, Puc became a Croatian citizen and played for the Croatian team with whom he won a gold medal at the 1996 Summer Olympics in Atlanta. He won two other medals in major tournaments with Croatia, a bronze medal at the 1994 European Championship and a silver medal at the 1995 World Championship.

In 1995 he was awarded the Order of Danica Hrvatska, and in 1996 he was the recipient of the Franjo Bučar Award.

In the late 1990s he switched his national side allegiance in favour of Slovenia, the country of his birth. He then played for the Slovenian team at the 2000 Summer Olympics in Sydney, where the team finished eighth. Slovenia qualified for the Sydney tournament after finishing fifth at the 2000 European Championship. The fifth place play-off match was played in Zagreb against host nation Croatia, Puc's former team. Puc was one of the best players of the game and Slovenia won the match 25–24, thus securing the last available spot for the 2000 Olympics. He played 34 games for Slovenia, during which he scored 120 goals.

== Retirement ==
After his retirement at Prule 67, he assumed the role of sports director at the club. Soon afterwards he moved to Florida together with his wife Jasenka, who is the daughter of the Croatian handball player and 1972 Olympic gold medalist Hrvoje Horvat, in support of their son Borut's tennis career. He and his wife sold all of their family possessions and enrolled their son to the Nick Bollettieri Tennis Academy. At the time of his father's death, Borut Puc was ranked 502nd on the ATP list with Goran Ivanišević as his tennis coach. Similar to his father, he also represented both Slovenia and Croatia. He started his career representing Slovenia and did so until the late 2000s (decade) when he changed his allegiance to Croatia.

== Illness and death ==
In early 2011, Puc was diagnosed with lung cancer that spread to his liver and bones. He died from cancer on 19 October 2011 in a San Diego hospital, just a few days before the Champions League game between Zagreb and Barcelona, with the revenue of the match intended to be donated to help cover the costs for his treatment. On 5 November 2011, a Handball Day was held in Celje, Slovenia, where two matches were played. In the first one, the 2000 Olympics Slovenian squad beat the Croatian squad composed of players who won the 1996 Olympic gold medal 29–25, while in the second match the regular squad of Slovenia beat the squad of Celje 35–32. This event was organized prior to Puc's death and matches would have been played even if he was still alive, as the main purpose was to gather donations for Puc and his family as financial aid for his treatment. Organizers collected around 17,000 euros and the revenue was bestowed on Puc's family. At the end of the match, which was seen by 4,000 spectators, the arena was completely dimmed. He is survived by his wife Jasenka and son Borut, a tennis player who resides in Florida, where the family moved to in 2005.

== Legacy ==
"Iztok Puc is possibly the best left back ever to play handball. A player with a great shot, overview on the field,... he had it all."

— Ivano Balić, two times IHF World Player of the Year.

Despite being known for his relaxed approach to training, Puc was described as a fiercely competitive and mentally tough player. At the celebration of the 60th anniversary of the Handball Federation of Slovenia in 2009, Puc was named the best left back and the best overall player in the history of Slovenian handball. Three days after his death, his former club RK Zagreb hosted Barcelona in an EHF Champions League match at Arena Zagreb. A clip of his match-winning goal for Zagreb in the 1993 EHF Champions League final was shown and 15,000 people joined in a minute-long standing ovation in his memory. In 2011 the Slovenian Olympic Committee together with the Croatian Olympic Committee and in collaboration with the Handball Federation of Slovenia and Croatian Handball Federation, introduced a joint award named in honour of Puc (Iztok Puc Award) that is awarded annually to the most promising U–18 handball player. The award is alternating between the two nations every year and is given alternately one year to Slovenian and another year to Croatian player.

== Honours ==
Zagreb

- Yugoslav First League (1): 1991
- Yugoslav Cup (1): 1991
- Croatian First League (4): 1991–92, 1992–93, 1993–94
- Croatian Cup (3): 1992, 1993, 1994
- EHF Champions League (2): 1992, 1993
- European Supercup (1): 1993

Celje

- Slovenian First League (5): 1994–95, 1995–96, 1996–97, 1997–98, 1998–99
- Slovenian Cup (5): 1995, 1996, 1997, 1998, 1999

Prule 67

- Slovenian First League (1): 2001–02
- Slovenian Cup (1): 2002

Individual

- MVP at IHF Men's Junior World Championship – 1987
- Franjo Bučar State Award for Sport – 1996
- Best player in history of Slovenia – 2009
- Slovenian Athletes Hall of Fame – 2016

Records

- 14th top scorer of Croatia – 325 goals

== Orders ==
- Order of Danica Hrvatska with face of Franjo Bučar – 1995
