= Bernd Eichwurzel =

East German rower

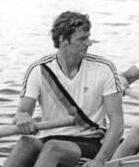
- Eichwurzel in 1988

Personal information
- Born: 25 October 1964 (age 61) Oranienburg, Bezirk Potsdam

Sport
- Sport: Rowing
- Club: SG Dynamo Potsdam / Sportvereinigung (SV) Dynamo
Medal record
Men's rowing
Representing East Germany
Olympic Games
Gold medal – first place	1988 Seoul	Coxed four
World Championships
Silver medal – second place	1983 Duisburg	Coxed four
Bronze medal – third place	1985 Hazewinkel	Coxed four
Gold medal – first place	1986 Nottingham	Coxed four
Gold medal – first place	1987 Copenhagen	Coxed four
Gold medal – first place	1990 Tasmania	Coxed four

Bernd Eichwurzel (born 25 October 1964 in Oranienburg, Bezirk Potsdam) is a rower who competed for the SG Dynamo Potsdam / Sportvereinigung (SV) Dynamo. He won medals at international rowing competitions. In October 1986, he was awarded a Patriotic Order of Merit in gold (first class) for his sporting success.
