= Viterbo University =

Private Catholic university in La Crosse, Wisconsin, US

Coordinates: 43.803235°N 91.244506°W

- Former names: St. Rose Normal School (1890–1939); Viterbo College (1939–2000)
- Type: Private university
- Established: 1890; 136 years ago
- Religious affiliation: Roman Catholic (Franciscan Sisters of Perpetual Adoration)
- Academic affiliations: AFCU; ACCU; NAICU; CIC
- President: Richard C. Trietley, Jr.
- Students: 1,904 (fall 2025)
- Undergraduates: 1,179 (fall 2025)
- Postgraduates: 725 (fall 2025)
- Location: La Crosse, Wisconsin, United States
- Campus: Urban
- Colors
- Nickname: V-Hawks
- Sporting affiliations: NAIA – CCAC
- Website: viterbo.edu

Viterbo University is a private Catholic university in La Crosse, Wisconsin, United States. Founded in 1890 by the Franciscan Sisters of Perpetual Adoration, Viterbo is home to three colleges with nine schools offering 48 academic programs at the associate, bachelor's, master's, and doctoral levels.

Viterbo is one of 23 Franciscan colleges and universities in the United States, with 1,904 undergraduate and graduate students and over 23,000 alumni. Viterbo is a member of the NAIA and the Chicagoland Collegiate Athletic Conference; its athletic teams are known as the V-Hawks.

== History ==
In 1890, the Franciscan Sisters of Perpetual Adoration founded "St. Rose Normal School" to prepare religious sisters to teach in elementary schools. College courses were later introduced in 1923 as Viterbo began laying the foundation to evolve into a four-year degree-granting institution. About 10 years later, the school developed a four-year college program, and by the 1931-32 school year became known as "St. Rose Junior College" with authorization from the University of Wisconsin–Madison. By 1939, it received approval as a four-year degree-granting institution for the preparation of teachers for elementary schools. Around this time, the school was renamed "Viterbo College", reflecting its evolving and expanding educational offerings. In 1940, Viterbo College held its first commencement exercises with certification from the State Department of Public Instruction.

During the 1950s, Viterbo continued to expand its liberal arts offerings and in 1952 it received accreditation from the University of Wisconsin Committee on College Accreditation, becoming a four-year liberal arts college. Since 1954, Viterbo had been accredited by the North Central Association of Colleges and Secondary Schools. Today it is fully accredited by the Higher Learning Commission, among many other commissions and groups.

On September 4, 2000, the college was renamed "Viterbo University" to reflect its growth into a comprehensive university with graduate and undergraduate offerings, including outreach programs. In 2013, the university's first doctoral program was introduced, in nursing practice.

== Campus ==
Viterbo's campus is on 21 acres of land in the Midtown district of La Crosse, Wisconsin, minutes from the city's downtown. The urban, 18-building campus is landlocked within the city's Washburn neighborhood. Viterbo also has a satellite campus in Des Moines, Iowa.

Centered around the historic St. Rose of Viterbo Convent, originally built in 1871 and rebuilt in 1923 after a fire, Viterbo's campus is compact. The first building to bear the Viterbo name hosted its first classes in January 1942. In 1972, the building was named Murphy Center in honor of W. Leo Murphy, a longtime Viterbo supporter and the first chair of the Board of Advisors.

In 1971, Viterbo's Fine Arts Center was completed. In 1987, the Varsity Athletic Center was built. In 2004, the D.B. and Marge Reinhart Center for Ethics, Science, and Technology was completed, and in 2005 the Amie L. Mathy Center expansion to the 1987 athletics building was completed. The Mathy Center is a collaboration between Viterbo and the local Boys and Girls Clubs of La Crosse—the first such effort in the country. A remodeling of the Todd Wehr Memorial Library within the main academic building, Murphy Center, was completed in 2006, and the school bookstore was remodeled in the summer of 2006. Between 2009 and 2011, the Student Union was remodeled at the expense of the Student Government Association, in collaboration with the Residence Hall Council. The remodel included upgrades to the security desk, flooring, computer area, television, and furniture.

The School of Nursing Building, which opened in 2011, has simulation labs dedicated to critical care, medical/surgical, maternal newborn care, child health care, nutrition and dietetics. Since 2013, Viterbo has shared space at the Weber Center for the Performing Arts, a 30,000-square-foot facility in downtown La Crosse, and the newest university facility.

The Viterbo University facilities in operation are:

- San Damiano Chapel (1914, built as St. Wenceslaus Catholic Church)
- Sister Thea Bowman Center, home to campus ministry (1926, built as St. Wenceslaus Catholic Church rectory)
- Murphy Center (1941)
- Brophy Center (1954, built as St. Wenceslaus School)
- Marian Hall (1957)
- Bonaventure Hall (1965)
- Fine Arts Center (1970)
- Treacy House (1975)
- McDonald Terrace (1975)
- Varsity Athletics Center (1987)
- Rose Terrace (1997)
- Outdoor Athletics Complex (1998)
- Physical Plant Building (2001)
- D.B. and Marge Reinhart Center for Ethics, Science, and Technology (2003)
- Amie L. Mathy Center for Recreation and Education (2005)
- School of Nursing Building (2011)
- Clare Apartments (2012)
- Weber Center for the Performing Arts (2013)

=== Transportation ===
Viterbo is southeast of downtown La Crosse and is served by the La Crosse MTU transit system, which offers students fare-free service. Route 1 provides bus service encircling the campus on Market Street, 11th Street and Jackson Street. SMRT buses stop on 11th Street, providing regional bus service to Prairie du Chien, Viroqua, Tomah and other destinations.

The bikeshare system DriftCycle has a bikeshare station between Mayo Clinic and Viterbo.

== Gallery ==
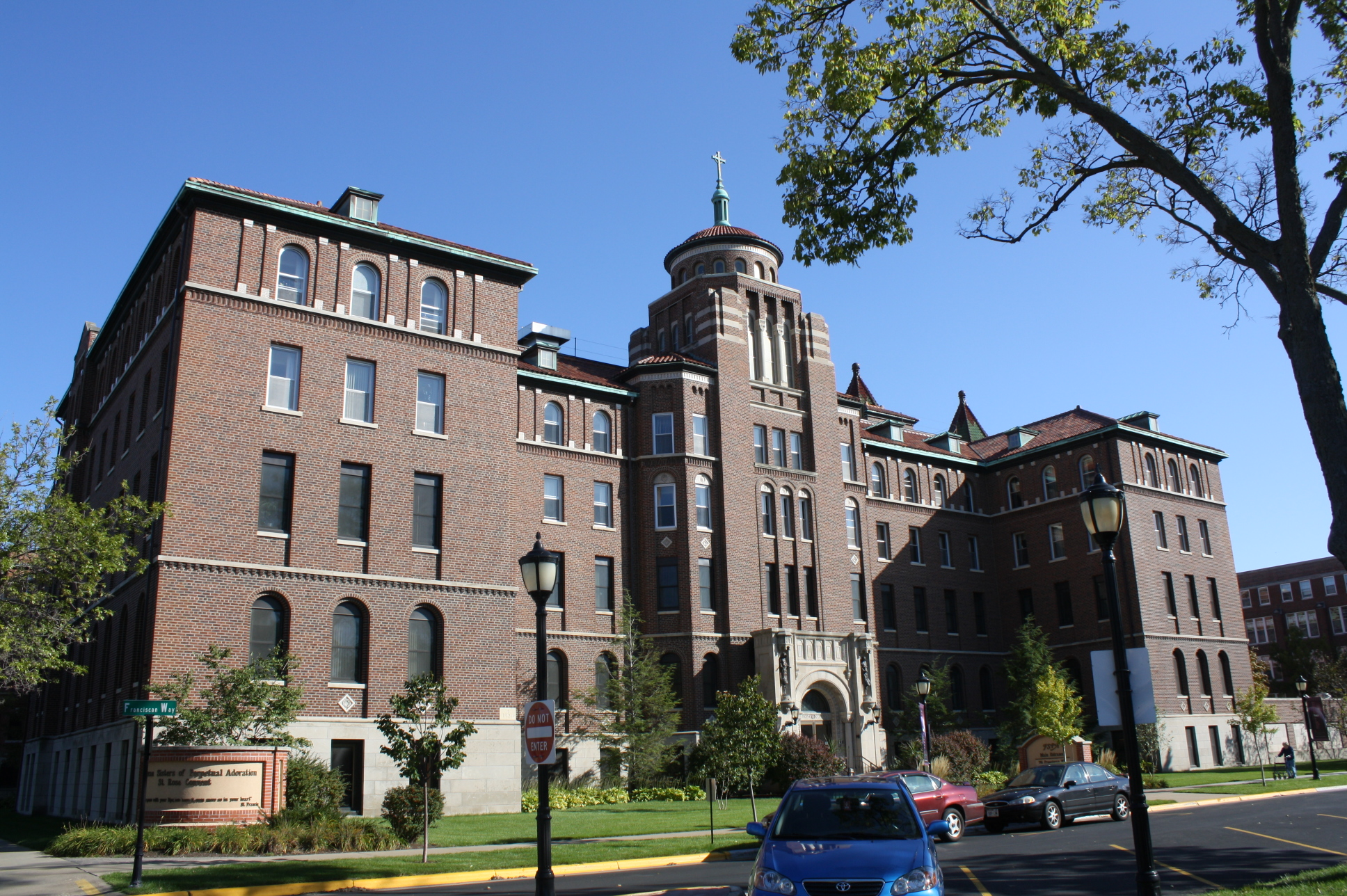
St. Rose of Viterbo Convent

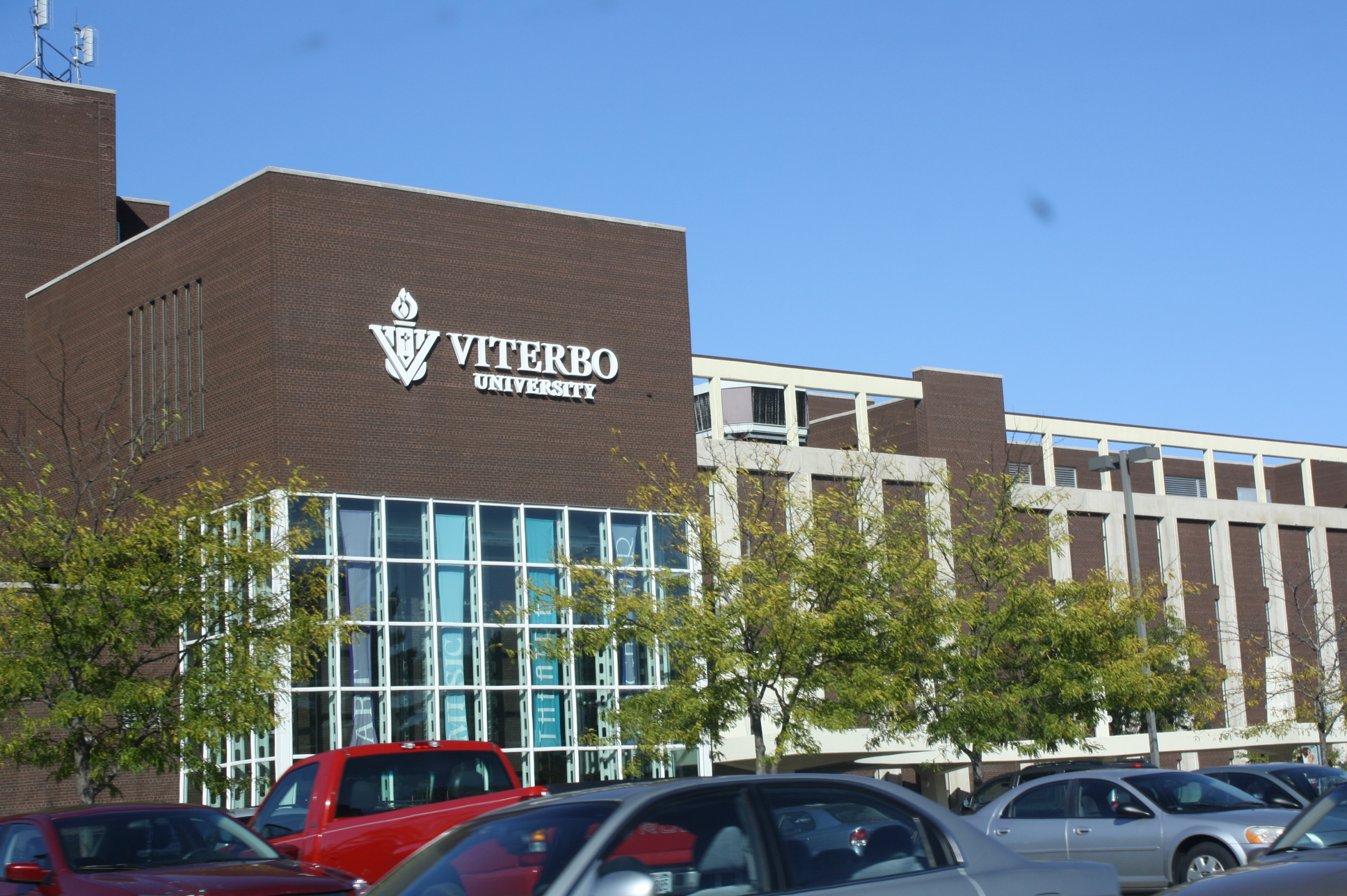
Fine Arts building

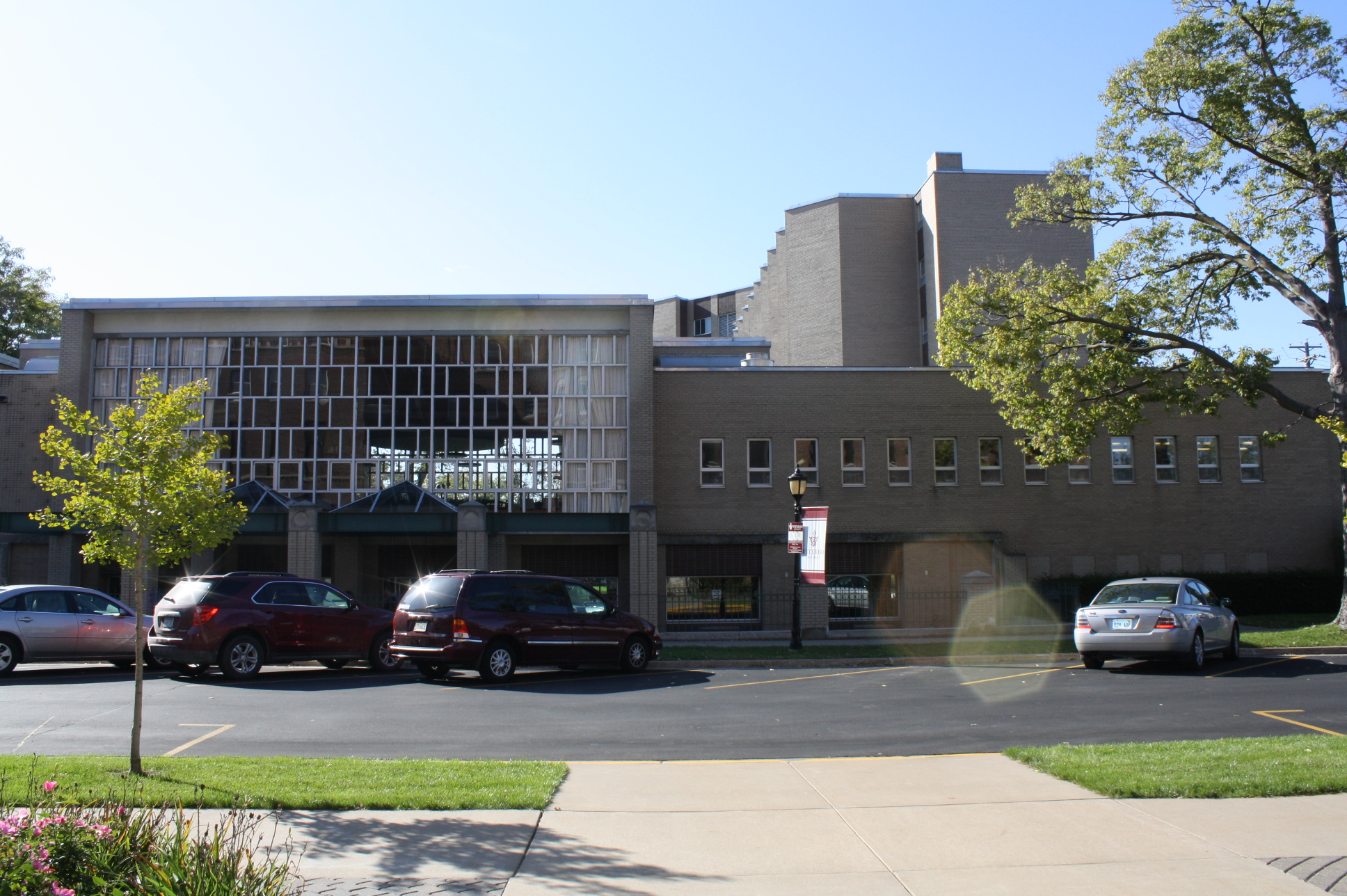
Student Union

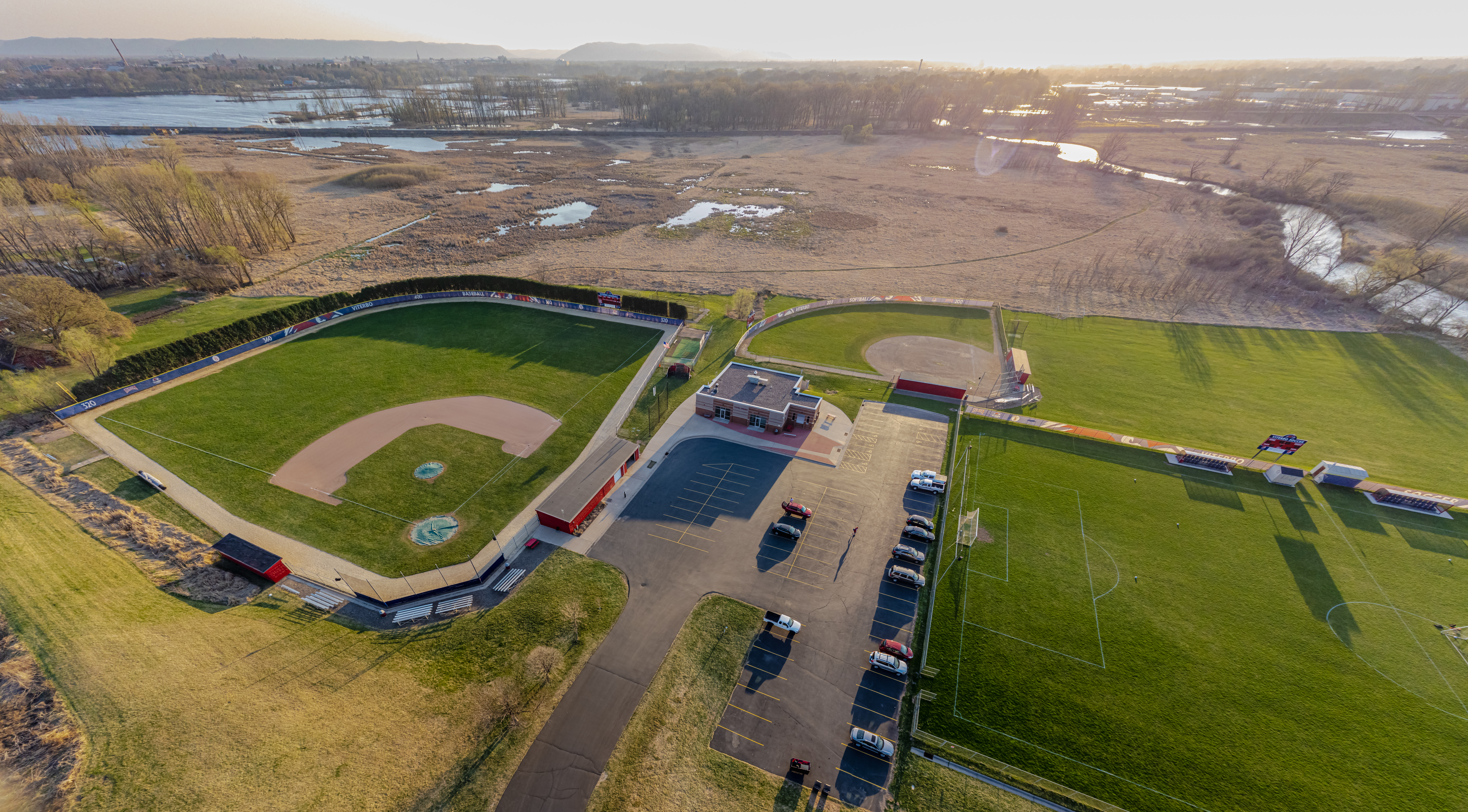
Viterbo fields

== Student demographics ==
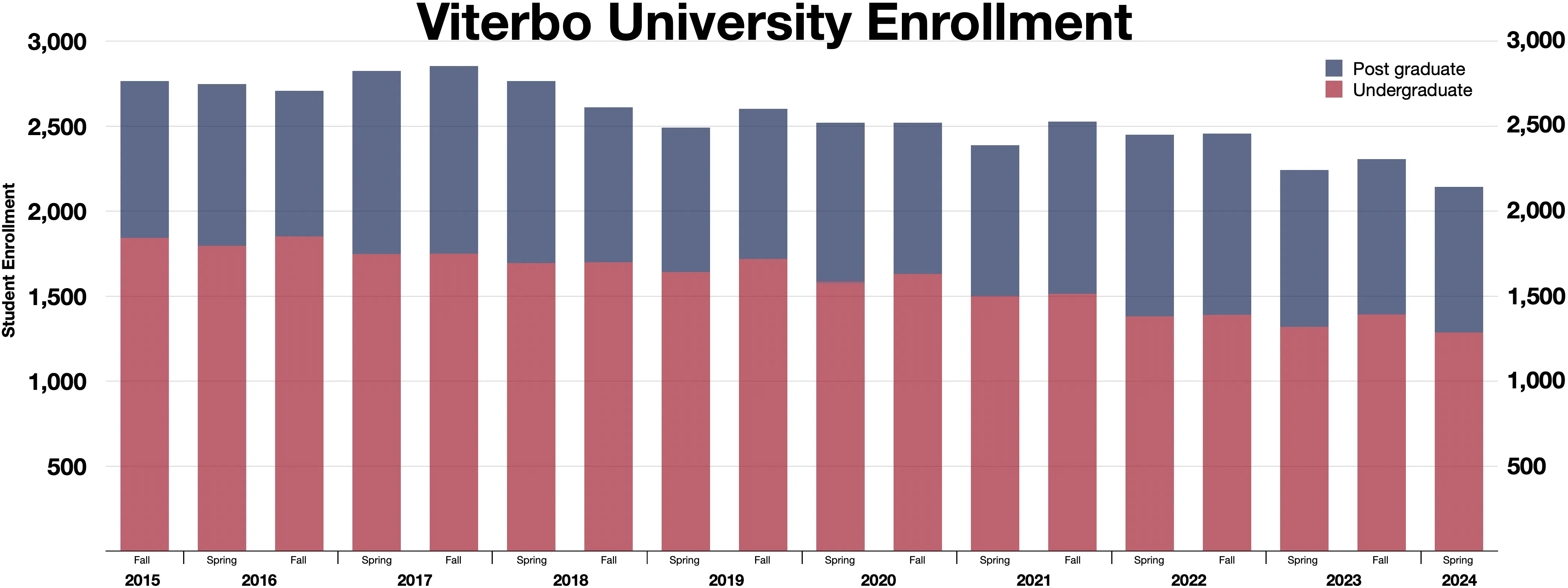
Viterbo University Enrollment Graduate students Undergraduate students

As of fall 2020, 2,521 students were enrolled at Viterbo. There were 1,630 undergraduates and 891 graduate students. Viterbo has a student/faculty ratio of 11:1 and an average class size of 16.

== Athletics ==
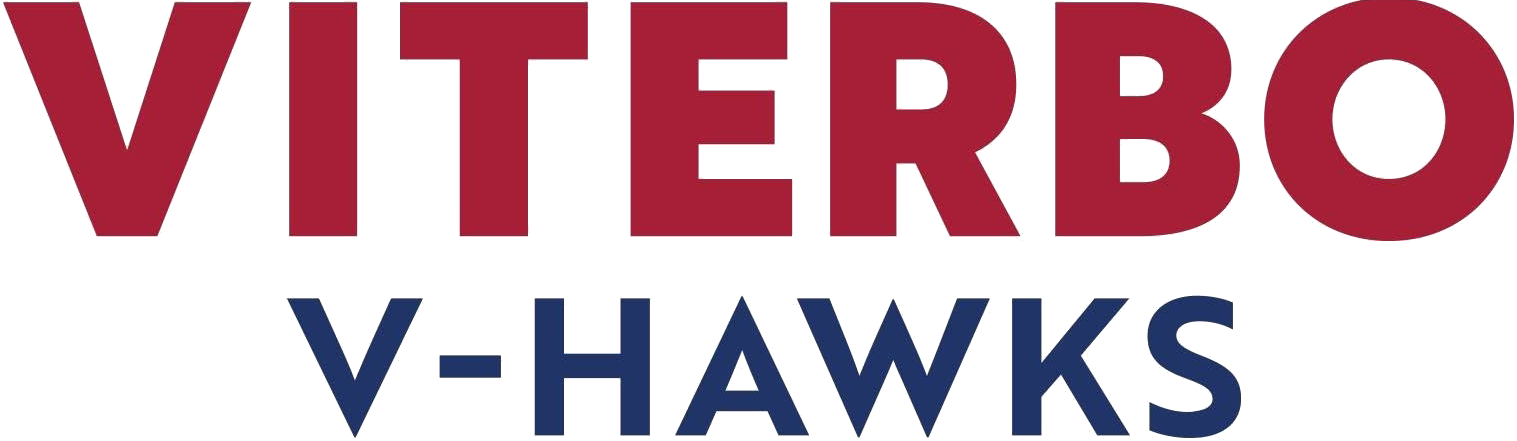
Viterbo athletics wordmark

Viterbo's athletic teams are called the V-Hawks. The university is a member of the National Association of Intercollegiate Athletics (NAIA), primarily competing in the Chicagoland Collegiate Athletic Conference (CCAC) since the 2024–25 academic year. The V-Hawks previously competed in the North Star Athletic Association (NSAA) from 2015–16 to 2023–24, as well as in the defunct Midwest Collegiate Conference (MCC) from 1989–90 to 2014–15, when the conference dissolved.

Viterbo competes in 20 intercollegiate varsity sports. Men's sports include baseball, basketball, bowling, cross country, golf, soccer, track & field (indoor and outdoor) and volleyball; women's sports include basketball, bowling, cross country, golf, soccer, softball, track & field (indoor and outdoor) and volleyball; and co-ed sports include competitive dance and eSports.

== Notable alumni ==
- Dolores Balderamos-Garcia, Belizean politician
- Linda Balgord, Broadway actress and singer
- Thea Bowman, Catholic religious sister, teacher and scholar
- Jorge Espat, Belizean politician
- Brian E. Konkol, 20th president of Valparaiso University
- Damian Miller, former Major League Baseball catcher
- Samantha Pauly, Broadway actress and singer
- Michelle Rifenberg, Minnesota state legislator
- Donna Rozar, politician
- Barry Lee Moe, Emmy Award-winning hairstylist

== Notable faculty ==
- Thea Bowman
- Richard Ruppel

== See also ==
- St. Rose of Viterbo Convent
- University of Wisconsin–La Crosse
- Western Technical College
