= Martin Svoboda (rowing) =

Czech rowing cox

Personal information
- Nationality: Czech
- Born: 26 April 1975 (age 49); Prague, Czechoslovakia

Sport
- Sport: Rowing

Martin Svoboda (born 26 April 1975) is a Czech rowing coxswain. He competed in the men's coxed four event at the 1992 Summer Olympics.
