= Martin Honegger =

Swiss rowing cox

Personal information
- Nationality: Swiss
- Born: 20 February 1956 (age 69)

Sport
- Sport: Rowing

Martin Honegger (born 20 February 1956) is a Swiss rowing coxswain. He competed in the men's coxed four event at the 1988 Summer Olympics.
