= Igor Bortnitsky =

Soviet rower

Personal information
- Nationality: Soviet
- Born: 13 June 1964 (age 60)

Sport
- Sport: Rowing

Igor Bortnitsky (born 13 June 1964) is a Soviet rower. He competed in the men's coxed four event at the 1992 Summer Olympics.
