= Igor Zotov =

Soviet rower

Personal information
- Nationality: Soviet
- Born: 17 July 1964 (age 60)

Sport
- Sport: Rowing

Igor Zotov (born 17 July 1964) is a Soviet rower. He competed in the men's coxed four event at the 1988 Summer Olympics.
