= Sergey Titov =

Soviet coxswain

Personal information
- Nationality: Soviet
- Born: 23 July 1965 (age 59)

Sport
- Sport: Rowing

Sergey Titov (born 23 July 1965) is a Soviet rowing coxswain. He competed in the men's coxed four event at the 1988 Summer Olympics.
