= Marcel Hotz =

Swiss rower

Personal information
- Nationality: Swiss
- Born: 18 May 1966 (age 60)

Sport
- Sport: Rowing

Marcel Hotz (born 18 May 1966) is a Swiss rower. He competed in the men's coxed four event at the 1988 Summer Olympics.
