= Agustín Alarcón =

Spanish rower

Personal information
- Full name: Agustín Alarcón Vargas
- Nationality: Spanish
- Born: 12 January 1962 (age 63); Baracaldo, Vizcaya, Spain

Sport
- Sport: Rowing

Agustín Alarcón Vargas (born 12 January 1962) is a Spanish rower. He competed in the men's coxed four event at the 1988 Summer Olympics.
