= Yang Gwang-jae =

South Korean rower

Personal information
- Nationality: South Korean
- Born: 1 July 1965 (age 59)

Sport
- Sport: Rowing

Yang Gwang-jae (born 1 July 1965) is a South Korean rower. He competed in the men's coxed four event at the 1988 Summer Olympics.
