= Lee Tae-hwa =

South Korean rower

Personal information
- Nationality: South Korean
- Born: 15 November 1968 (age 57)

Sport
- Sport: Rowing

Lee Tae-hwa (Korean: 이태화; born 15 November 1968) is a South Korean rower. He competed in the men's coxed four event at the 1988 Summer Olympics.
