= Pyotr Petrinich =

Belarusian rowing cox

Personal information
- Nationality: Belarusian
- Born: 20 December 1957 (age 68) Brest, Belarusian SSR, Soviet Union

Sport
- Sport: Rowing
Medal record
Men's rowing
Representing Soviet Union
World Rowing Championships
Silver medal – second place	1983 Duisburg	Coxed pair

Pyotr Petrinich (born 20 December 1957) is a Belarusian rowing cox. He competed in the men's coxed four event at the 1992 Summer Olympics.
