= Jeong Jae-won =

South Korean rower (born 1969)

Personal information
- Nationality: South Korean
- Born: 9 June 1969 (age 56)
- Education: Korea National Sport University

Korean name
- Hangul: 정재원
- Hanja: 鄭在原
- RR: Jeong Jaewon
- MR: Chŏng Chaewŏn

Sport
- Sport: Rowing

Jeong Jae-won (born 9 June 1969) is a South Korean rower. He competed in the men's coxed four event at the 1988 Summer Olympics. He attended Korea National Sport University. He also competed in the men's coxed four event at the 1989 Summer Universiade.
