= Dario Varga =

Croatian rower

Personal information
- Nationality: Croatian
- Born: 2 April 1973 (age 51); Zadar, Yugoslavia

Sport
- Sport: Rowing

Dario Varga (born 2 April 1973) is a Croatian rowing coxswain. He competed in the men's coxed four event at the 1988 Summer Olympics.
