= Petr Hlídek =

Czech rower

Personal information
- Nationality: Czech
- Born: 4 May 1962 (age 63); Olomouc, Czechoslovakia

Sport
- Sport: Rowing

Petr Hlídek (born 4 May 1962) is a Czech rower. He competed in the men's coxed four event at the 1988 Summer Olympics.
