= Gang Man-gu =

South Korean rower (born 1969)

Personal information
- Nationality: South Korean
- Born: 1 July 1969 (age 55)
- Education: Korea National Sport University

Korean name
- Hangul: 강만구
- Hanja: 姜萬九
- RR: Gang Mangu
- MR: Kang Man'gu

Sport
- Sport: Rowing

Gang Man-gu (Korean: 강만구; born 1 July 1969) is a South Korean rower. He competed in the men's coxed four event at the 1988 Summer Olympics. He attended Korea National Sport University. He subsequently represented South Korea at the 1989 World Rowing Championships.
