= Bernd Niesecke =

East German rower

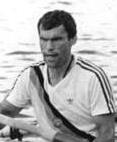
- Niesecke in 1988

Medal record

Men's rowing

Representing East Germany

Olympic Games
Gold medal – first place	1988 Seoul	Coxed four

Friendship Games
Silver medal – second place	1984 Moscow	Eight

World Championships
Gold medal – first place	1981 Munich	Coxed four
Gold medal – first place	1986 Nottingham	Coxed four
Gold medal – first place	1987 Copenhagen	Coxed four
Silver medal – second place	1982 Luzern	Eight
Silver medal – second place	1983 Duisburg	Coxed four
Bronze medal – third place	1985 Hazewinkel	Coxed four

Bernd Niesecke (born 30 October 1958) is a German rower, who competed for the SC Dynamo Potsdam / Sportvereinigung (SV) Dynamo. He won the medals at the international rowing competitions. In October 1986, he was awarded a Patriotic Order of Merit in gold (first class) for his sporting success.

== Olympic career ==
Niesecke could not participate due to the Soviet-led boycott at the 1984 Los Angeles Games. But he won the gold medal with the East German coxed fours at the 1988 Seoul Olympics. Also with the coxed fours Niesecke won three world titles in 1981, 1986, and 1987. And he won two silvers, with the eights in 1982 and coxed fours in 1983. He also won a coxed fours bronze in 1985.

== Post-Olympic career ==
He was a policeman until German re-unification, and was then taken over by the Special Mission Command (SEK) Berlin.
