= Sigitas Kučinskas =

Lithuanian rower (born 1963)

Personal information
- Nationality: Lithuanian
- Born: 11 March 1963 (age 62); Viduklė, Lithuanian SSR, Soviet Union

Sport
- Sport: Rowing

Sigitas Kučinskas (born 11 March 1963) is a Lithuanian rower. He competed in the men's coxed four event at the 1988 Summer Olympics.
