= Simon Berrisford =

British rower

Personal information
- Born: 29 December 1963 (age 62) London, England

Sport
- Sport: Rowing
- Event: coxless pair
- Club: Leander Club
Medal record
Men's rowing
Representing Great Britain
World Rowing Championships
Silver medal – second place	1989 Bled	M2-

Simon Netcott Berrisford (born 29 December 1963) is a former British rower. He competed in the men's coxless four event at the 1988 Summer Olympics and in the men's coxed four at the 1992 Summer Olympics. He won a silver medal at the 1989 World Rowing Championships in the coxless pairs, partnered by Steve Redgrave.

In 1989, he won the Silver Goblets & Nickalls' Challenge Cup (the premier coxless pair event) with Redgrave at the Henley Royal Regatta, rowing for Leander.
