= Chris Huntington =

American rower

Personal information
- Born: September 22, 1960 (age 65) Bethesda, Maryland, United States

Sport
- Sport: Rowing
Medal record
Men's rowing
Representing United States
World Rowing Championships
Bronze medal – third place	1985 Hazewinkel	Eight
Bronze medal – third place	1986 Nottingham	Coxed four

Chris Huntington (born September 22, 1960) is an American rower. He won gold at the 1987 Pan American Games, and competed in the men's coxed four event at the 1988 Summer Olympics. Huntington later became a news correspondent for CNN.

== Biography ==
Huntington was born in Bethesda, Maryland in 1960. He rowed and studied at the University of California, Berkeley, before moving to England to study at the University of Oxford. At Oxford, Huntington was part of what was known as the "Oxford Mutiny" prior to the 1987 Boat Race. Huntington, along with Dan Lyons, Chris Penny and Jonathan Fish departed from Oxford's squad in protest of the training and coaching being delivered by the team coach Dan Topolski.

At the World Rowing Championships, Huntington won two bronze medals. His first came in eights event in 1985, and his second bronze came the following year in the coxed four event. He then went on to win a silver medal at the 1986 Goodwill Games, and the gold medal in the eight at the 1987 Pan American Games. At the 1988 Summer Olympics in Seoul, Huntington competed in the men's coxed four, with the US team finishing in fifth place.

After his rowing career, Huntington worked for nearly two decades as a correspondent and producer for CNN. He then went to work in the energy sector, becoming a business partner in a renewable energy company.
