= Frank Klawonn =

German rower

- Frank Klawonn who became a 1988 GDR-champion

Medal record

Representing East Germany

Rowing at the Summer Olympics
Gold medal – first place	1988 Seoul	Coxed four

World Rowing Championships
Gold medal – first place	Nottingham 1986	Coxed four
Gold medal – first place	Copenhagen 1987	Coxed four

Frank Klawonn (born 22 March 1966 in Schwedt, Brandenburg) is a German rower who competed for the SG Dynamo Potsdam / Sportvereinigung (SV) Dynamo. He won the medals at the international rowing competitions. In October 1986, he was awarded a Patriotic Order of Merit in gold (first class) for his sporting success.
