= Hendrik Reiher =

German rowing cox (born 1962)

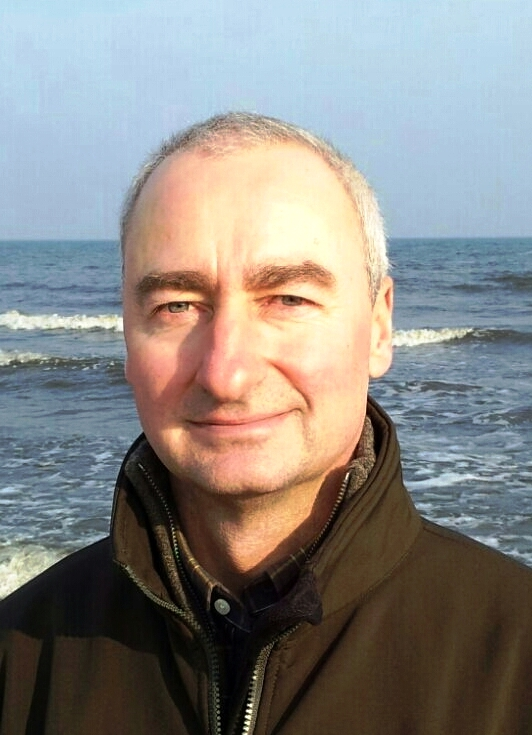

Medal record

Men's rowing

Olympic Games

Representing East Germany
Gold medal – first place	1988 Seoul	Coxed four

Representing Germany
Silver medal – second place	1992 Barcelona	Coxed four

Friendship Games

Representing East Germany
Bronze medal – third place	1984 Moscow	Coxed pair

World Rowing Championships

Representing East Germany
Gold medal – first place	1986 Nottingham	Coxed four
Gold medal – first place	1987 Copenhagen	Coxed four
Gold medal – first place	1990 Tasmania	Coxed four
Silver medal – second place	1981 Munich	Coxed pair
Silver medal – second place	1982 Lucerne	Coxed pair
Silver medal – second place	1983 Duisburg	Eight
Bronze medal – third place	1985 Hazewinkel	Coxed four

Hendrik Reiher (born 25 January 1962 in Eisenhüttenstadt) is a German former rowing cox. He competed for the SG Dynamo Potsdam / Sportvereinigung (SV) Dynamo. He won medals at several Summer Olympics as well as at international rowing competitions. He competed for East Germany until 1990, and from the 1991 rowing season for Germany after the German reunification.
