= Carl Sheehan =

New Zealand rower

Personal information
- Birth name: Carl Thomas Sheehan
- Nationality: New Zealand
- Born: 8 February 1974 (age 51); Christchurch, New Zealand

Carl Thomas Sheehan (born 8 February 1974) is a New Zealand rowing cox.

Sheehan was born in 1974 in Christchurch, New Zealand. He represented New Zealand at the 1992 Summer Olympics. He is listed as New Zealand Olympian athlete number 670 by the New Zealand Olympic Committee.
