= Antonio Maurogiovanni =

Italian rower

Personal information
- Nationality: Italian
- Born: 20 October 1965 (age 60) Bari, Italy

Sport
- Sport: Rowing
Medal record
Representing Italy
World Rowing Championships
Silver medal – second place	1985 Hazewinkel	Eights
Bronze medal – third place	1987 Copenhagen	Coxed fours
Summer Universiade
Silver medal – second place	1987 Zagreb	Coxed fours
Mediterranean Games
Gold medal – first place	1991 Athens	Coxless fours

Antonio Maurogiovanni (born 20 October 1965) is an Italian rower. He competed at the 1988 Summer Olympics and the 1992 Summer Olympics.
