= Giovanni Miccoli =

Italian rower

Personal information
- Nationality: Italian
- Born: 24 December 1963 (age 62) Trieste, Italy

Sport
- Sport: Rowing
Medal record
Representing Italy
World Rowing Championships
Silver medal – second place	1985 Hazewinkel	Eight
Bronze medal – third place	1987 Copenhagen	Eight
Summer Universiade
Silver medal – second place	1987 Zagreb	Coxed fours

Giovanni Miccoli (born 24 December 1963) is an Italian rower. He competed in the men's coxed four event at the 1988 Summer Olympics.
