= Tino Vegar =

Croatian water polo player

Personal information
- Born: 30 January 1967 (age 59) Split, Yugoslavia

Sport
- Sport: Water polo
Medal record
Representing Croatia
Olympic Games
Silver medal – second place	1996 Atlanta	Team competition

Tino Vegar (born 30 January 1967) is a water polo player from Croatia, who was a member of the national team that won the silver medal at the 1996 Summer Olympics in Atlanta, Georgia.

== See also ==
- List of Olympic medalists in water polo (men)
