= Marijan Kanjer =

Croatian swimmer (born 1973)

Medal record

Men's swimming

Representing Croatia

European Championships (SC)
Bronze medal – third place	1993 Gateshead	4x50 m freestyle

Marijan Kanjer (born 1 October 1973, in Rijeka) is a freestyle swimmer from Croatia, who competed in two consecutive Summer Olympics for his native country, starting in 1996.
