= Richard Ruppel =

Richard J. Ruppel is a professor in and chair of the English Department at Viterbo University in La Crosse, Wisconsin. A notable scholar on Joseph Conrad and sexuality, he has edited, with Philip Holden, a collection of essays entitled Imperial Desire: Dissident Sexualities and Colonial Literature, while his own essays on Conrad have been published in such journals as Conradiana, The Conradian, Studies in the Novel and L'Epoque Conradienne. As of 1998, he was working on a book about male intimacy in the life and works of Conrad.

== Bibliography ==
- Ruppel, Richard. "Joseph Conrad and the Ghost of Oscar Wilde." The Conradian, 1998: 19–36.
