= Philippe Lot =

French rower (born 1967)

Personal information
- Born: 13 June 1967 (age 59) Gravelines, France

Sport
- Sport: Rowing
Medal record
Men's rowing
Representing France
World Rowing Championships
Gold medal – first place	1993 Račice	Four
Silver medal – second place	1994 Indianapolis	Four

Philippe Lot (born 13 June 1967) is a French Olympic rower.

== Career ==
Lot represented France at the 1992 Summer Olympics in the coxed four where he came fifth. He won a gold medal at the 1993 World Rowing Championships in Račice with the men's four.
