= Javier Viñolas =

Spanish rower

Personal information
- Nationality: Spanish
- Born: 11 March 1971 (age 54)

Sport
- Sport: Rowing

Javier Viñolas (born 11 March 1971) is a Spanish rowing coxswain. He competed in the men's coxed four event at the 1988 Summer Olympics.
