= Michal Šubrt =

Czech rower

Personal information
- Nationality: Czech
- Born: 24 June 1967 (age 57); Prague, Czechoslovakia

Sport
- Sport: Rowing

Michal Šubrt (born 24 June 1967) is a Czech rower. He competed in the men's coxed four event at the 1988 Summer Olympics.
