= Michał Cieślak (rowing) =

Polish rowing cox (born 1968)

Medal record

Men's rowing

Representing Poland
Event	1st	2nd	3rd
Olympic Games	0	0	1
World Championships	0	0	1
European Championships	0	0	0
Total	0	0	2

Olympic Games
Bronze medal – third place	1992 Barcelona	Coxed fours

World Rowing Championships
Bronze medal – third place	1991 Vienna	M4+

Michał Cieślak (born 6 September 1968 in Sierpc) is a Polish rowing cox.
