= Guy Melville =

New Zealand rower

Personal information
- Birth name: Guy Robertson Campbell Melville
- Nationality: New Zealand
- Born: 9 December 1968 (age 56); Wanganui, New Zealand

Guy Robertson Campbell Melville (born 9 December 1968) is a New Zealand rower.

Melville was born in 1968 in Wanganui, New Zealand. He represented New Zealand at the 1992 Summer Olympics. He is listed as New Zealand Olympian athlete number 646 by the New Zealand Olympic Committee.
