= Yannick Schulte =

French rower

Personal information
- Nationality: French
- Born: 28 November 1970 (age 54); Saint-Mihiel, France

Sport
- Sport: Rowing

Yannick Schulte (born 28 November 1970) is a French rower. He competed in the men's coxed four event at the 1992 Summer Olympics.
