= Aleksandar Fabijanić =

Croatian rower

Personal information
- Nationality: Croatian
- Born: 18 June 1965 (age 59); Rijeka, Croatia

Sport
- Sport: Rowing

Aleksandar Fabijanić (born 18 June 1965) is a Croatian rower. He competed in the men's coxed four event at the 1992 Summer Olympics.
