= Damir Glavan =

Croatian water polo player

Personal information
- Nationality: Croatian
- Born: 2 March 1974 (age 52) Rijeka
- Height: 202 cm (6 ft 8 in)
- Weight: 103 kg (227 lb)

Sport
- Sport: Water polo
Medal record
Men's water polo
Representing Croatia
Olympic Games
Silver medal – second place	1996 Atlanta	Team

Damir Glavan (born 2 March 1974) is a water polo player from Croatia, who was a member of the national team that won the silver medal at the 1996 Summer Olympics in Atlanta, Georgia.

== See also ==
- List of Olympic medalists in water polo (men)
