= Roman Špirelja =

Croatian sports shooter

Personal information
- Nationality: Croatian
- Born: 31 January 1973 (age 52); Zagreb, Yugoslavia

Sport
- Sport: Sports shooting

Roman Špirelja (born 31 January 1973) is a Croatian sports shooter. He competed at the 1996 Summer Olympics and the 2000 Summer Olympics.
