= Karsten Finger =

German rower (born 1970)

Medal record

Men's rowing

Representing Germany

Olympic Games
Silver medal – second place	1992 Barcelona	Coxed fours

Karsten Finger (born 28 January 1970 in Berlin) is a German rower.
