= Jean-Paul Vergne =

French rower

Personal information
- Nationality: French
- Born: 13 March 1970 (age 55); Fumel, France

Sport
- Sport: Rowing

Jean-Paul Vergne (born 13 March 1970) is a French rower. He competed in the men's coxed four event at the 1992 Summer Olympics.
