= Giuseppe Carando =

Italian rower

Personal information
- Nationality: Italian
- Born: 18 March 1964 (age 62) Turin, Italy

Sport
- Sport: Rowing
Medal record
Representing Italy
World Championships
Silver medal – second place	1985 Hazewinkel	Coxed fours
Silver medal – second place	1987 Copenhagen	Coxed fours
Summer Universiade
Gold medal – first place	1989 Duisburg	Eights
Silver medal – second place	1987 Zagreb	Coxed fours

Giuseppe Carando (born 18 March 1964) is an Italian rower. He competed at the 1984 Summer Olympics and the 1988 Summer Olympics.
