= Dino Lucchetta =

Italian rowing cox

Personal information
- Nationality: Italian
- Born: 13 March 1968 (age 57); Turin, Italy

Sport
- Sport: Rowing

Dino Lucchetta (born 13 March 1968) is an Italian rowing coxswain. He competed at the 1988 Summer Olympics and the 1992 Summer Olympics.
