= Teo Bielefeld =

American rower

Personal information
- Nationality: American
- Born: September 11, 1965 (age 60) Berkeley, California, United States

Sport
- Sport: Rowing

Teo Bielefeld (born September 11, 1965) is an American former rower. He competed in the men's coxed four event at the 1992 Summer Olympics. After the Olympics, he changed his surname to Bielé, becoming a filmmaker, chef and hunter.
