= John Deakin (rowing) =

British coxswain

Personal information
- Born: 4 March 1965 (age 61)

Sport
- Sport: Rowing
Medal record
Men's rowing
Representing Great Britain
World Rowing Championships
Gold medal – first place	1994 Indianapolis	Lwt eight
Silver medal – second place	1995 Tampere	Lwt eight
Silver medal – second place	1997 Aiguebelette	Lwt eight
Bronze medal – third place	1990 Tasmania	Lwt eight

John Deakin (born 4 March 1965) is a British coxswain. He won a gold medal at the 1994 World Rowing Championships in Indianapolis with the lightweight men's eight.
