= Tim Evans (rowing) =

American rower

Personal information
- Born: June 23, 1970 (age 56) San Francisco, California, United States

Sport
- Sport: Rowing

Tim Evans (born June 23, 1970) is an American rowing cox. He competed in the men's coxed four event at the 1992 Summer Olympics.
