= Goran Puljko =

Croatian rower

Personal information
- Nationality: Croatian
- Born: 7 December 1977 (age 47); Zagreb, Croatia

Sport
- Sport: Rowing

Goran Puljko (born 7 December 1977) is a Croatian rowing cox. He competed in the men's coxed four event at the 1992 Summer Olympics.
