= Dušan Macháček =

Czech rower

Personal information
- Nationality: Czech
- Born: 7 October 1966 (age 58); Prague, Czechoslovakia

Sport
- Sport: Rowing

Dušan Macháček (born 7 October 1966) is a Czech rower. He competed at the 1988 Summer Olympics and the 1992 Summer Olympics.
