= Uwe Kellner =

German rower

Olympic medal record

Representing Germany

Rowing at the Summer Olympics
Silver medal – second place	1992 Barcelona	4+

Representing East Germany

World Rowing Championships
Gold medal – first place	Bled 1989	2-
Gold medal – first place	Tasmania1990	2-

Uwe Kellner (born 17 March 1966 in Jena) is a German rower, who competed for the SC Dynamo Berlin / Sportvereinigung (SV) Dynamo. He won his medals at the international rowing competitions at Bled 1989 and Tasmania 1990.
