= Bruno Saile =

Swiss rower

Medal record

Men's rowing

Representing Switzerland

World Rowing Championships
Gold medal – first place	1982 Lucerne	M4-
Silver medal – second place	1981 Munich	M4-
Bronze medal – third place	1978 Karapiro	M2x

Bruno Saile (born 1 March 1952 in Thalwil) is a Swiss rower. He won the gold medal in the coxless four at the 1982 World Rowing Championships.
