= John Houlding (rower) =

Canadian rower (born 1962)

Personal information
- Born: 1 June 1962 (age 63) Montreal, Quebec, Canada

Sport
- Sport: Rowing

John Houlding (born 1 June 1962) is a Canadian rower. He competed at the 1984 Summer Olympics and the 1988 Summer Olympics.
