= Vladimir Banjanac =

Serbian rower (born 1966)

Personal information
- Nationality: Serbian
- Born: 13 October 1966 (age 58)

Sport
- Sport: Rowing

Vladimir Banjanac (born 13 October 1966) is a Serbian rower. He competed at the 1988 Summer Olympics and the 1992 Summer Olympics.
