= Thoralf Peters =

German rower (born 1968)

Medal record

Men's rowing

Representing Germany

Olympic Games
Silver medal – second place	1992 Barcelona	Coxed fours

Thoralf Peters (born 13 January 1968 in Güstrow) is a German rower.
