= Martin Ruppel =

German coxswain

Personal information
- Nationality: German
- Born: 5 November 1966 (age 58); Osterode am Harz, Germany

Sport
- Sport: Rowing

Martin Ruppel (born 5 November 1966) is a German former rowing coxswain. He competed in the men's coxed four event at the 1988 Summer Olympics.
