= Tomasz Tomiak =

Polish rower (1967–2020)

Medal record

Men's rowing

Representing Poland
Event	1st	2nd	3rd
Olympic Games	0	0	1
World Championships	0	1	1
European Championships	0	0	0
Total	0	2	1

Olympic Games
Bronze medal – third place	1992 Barcelona	Coxed fours

World Rowing Championships
Silver medal – second place	1993 Račice	M4-
Bronze medal – third place	1991 Vienna	M4+

Tomasz Piotr Tomiak (17 September 1967 – 21 August 2020) was a Polish rower. He was born in Nowy Tomyśl.
