= Lazo Pivač =

Serbian rower

Personal information
- Nationality: Serbian
- Born: 18 January 1967 (age 58)

Sport
- Sport: Rowing

Lazo Pivač, Лазо Пивач (born 18 January 1967) is a Serbian rower. He competed at the 1988 Summer Olympics and the 1992 Summer Olympics.
