= Vladimir Romanishin =

Soviet rower (1959–2026)

Personal information
- Full name: Vladimir Stanislavovich Romanishin
- Nationality: Soviet
- Born: 27 August 1959
- Died: 7 November 2026 (aged 67)

Sport
- Sport: Rowing

Vladimir Stanislavovich Romanishin (Russian: Владимир Станиславович Романишин; 27 August 1959 – 7 November 2026) was a Soviet and Belarusian rower. He competed at the 1988 Summer Olympics and the 1992 Summer Olympics.

Romanishin died on 7 November 2026, at the age of 67.
