= Sean Hall =

American rower (born 1967)

Medal record

Men's rowing

Representing United States

World Rowing Championships
Gold medal – first place	1994 Indianapolis	M8+
Bronze medal – third place	1993 Račice	M4-
Bronze medal – third place	1995 Tampere	M8+

M Sean Hall (born August 20, 1967, in Williamsburg, Virginia) is an international Level 3 rowing coach. Hall’s career in the sport of rowing began as an oarsman and over his tenure earned many accolades that include three-time Olympian (1992, 1996, 2000), US National Team (10 years) and USRowing Hall of Fame athlete. This includes a gold (Men's 8+) and two bronze (Men's 8+, Men's 4-) medals from World Championships, plus a world record in the 8+.

In 2021 he started the Black Sheep a high performance program to help aspiring athletes achieve their goals while also helping to energize the local rowing community and build connections between top level athletes, junior, and masters level athletes. Black Sheep Racing has sent athletes to the World Championships in 2022, 2023, and 2024, as well as qualifying a rower for the 2024 Olympics in Paris.
