= Maciej Łasicki =

Polish rower (1965–2025)

Medal record

Men's rowing

Representing Poland
Event	1st	2nd	3rd
Olympic Games	0	0	1
World Championships	0	1	2
European Championships	0	0	0
Total	0	2	2

Olympic Games
Bronze medal – third place	1992 Barcelona	Coxed fours

World Rowing Championships
Silver medal – second place	1993 Račice	M4-
Bronze medal – third place	1991 Vienna	M4+
Bronze medal – third place	1995 Tampere	M4-

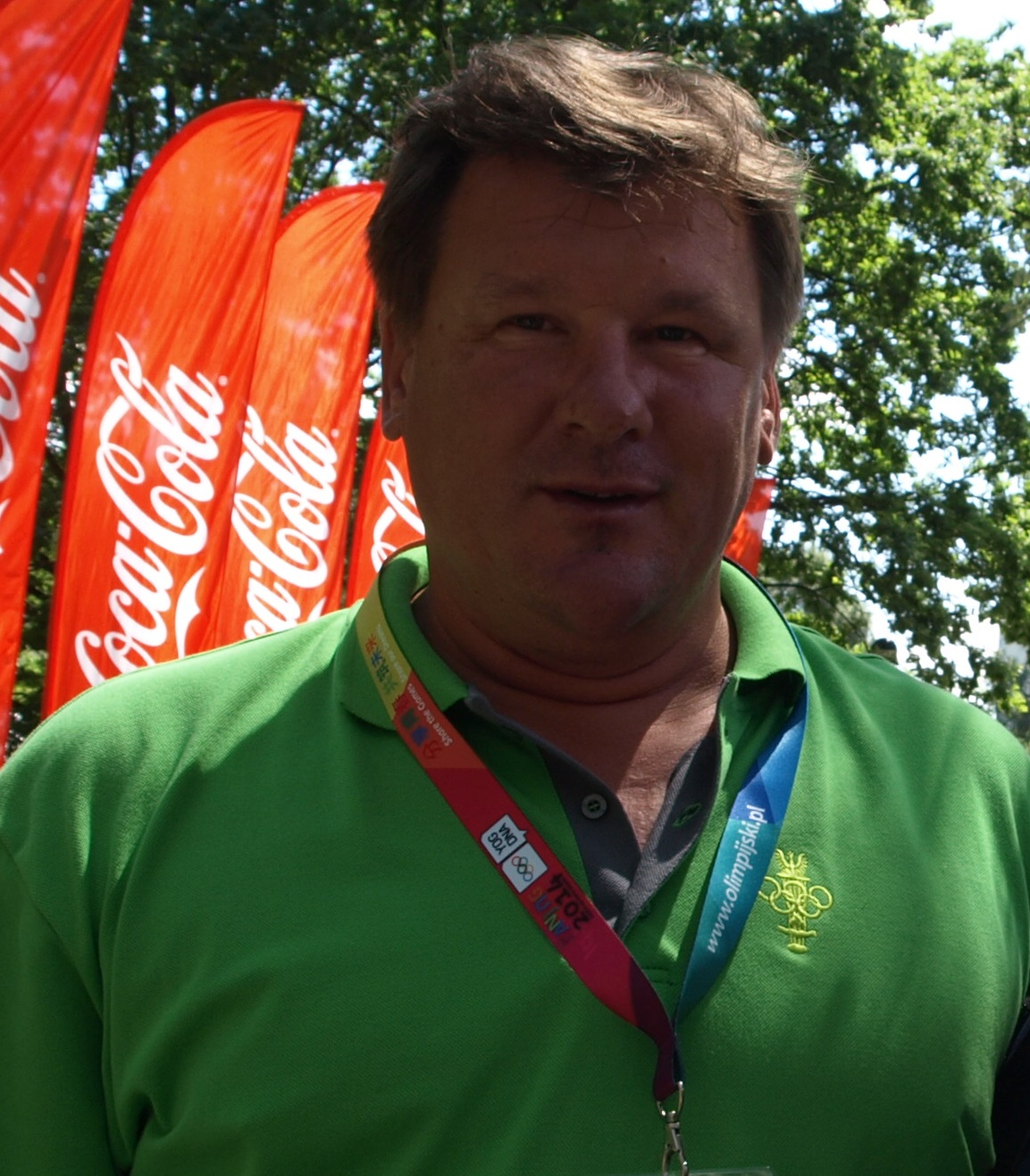

Maciej Piotr Łasicki (12 October 1965 – 19 December 2025) was a Polish rower. He was born in Gdańsk on 12 October 1965, and died on 19 December 2025, at the age of 60.

== Sources ==
- Maciej Łasicki at World Rowing
- Evans, Hilary; Gjerde, Arild; Heijmans, Jeroen; Mallon, Bill; et al. "Maciej Łasicki". Olympics at Sports-Reference.com. Sports Reference LLC. Archived from the original on 18 April 2020.
