= Daniel Fauché =

French rower (born 1966)

Medal record

Men's rowing

Representing France

Olympic Games
Silver medal – second place	1996 Atlanta	Coxless four

World Rowing Championships
Gold medal – first place	1993 Račice	M4-
Silver medal – second place	1994 Indianapolis	M4-
Silver medal – second place	1997 Aiguebelette	M4-
Silver medal – second place	1998 Cologne	M4-

Daniel Fauché (French pronunciation: [danjɛl foʃe]; born 22 December 1966, in Chantilly) is a French rower.
