= Jean-Pierre Huguet-Balent =

French rower

Personal information
- Nationality: French
- Born: 19 March 1955 (age 70); Villeneuve-sur-Lot, France

Sport
- Sport: Rowing

Jean-Pierre Huguet-Balent (born 19 March 1955) is a French rowing coxswain. He competed at the 1976, 1980, 1984 and the 1992 Summer Olympics.
