= Marko Banović =

Croatian rower

Personal information
- Nationality: Croatian
- Born: 24 April 1967 (age 59) Zagreb, Croatia

Sport
- Sport: Rowing
Medal record
Representing Yugoslavia
Summer Universiade
Bronze medal – third place	1987 Zagreb	Quadruple sculls
Representing Croatia
Mediterranean Games
Gold medal – first place	1997 Bari	Coxless fours
Bronze medal – third place	1993 Languedoc	Coxless fours

Marko Banović (born 24 April 1967) is a Croatian rower. He competed at the 1992 Summer Olympics and the 1996 Summer Olympics.
