= Ninoslav Saraga =

Croatian rower

Medal record

Men's rowing

Representing Croatia

World Rowing Championships
Bronze medal – third place	1999 St. Catharines	M2-
Bronze medal – third place	2002 Seville	M4+

Ninoslav Saraga (born 3 January 1969 in Osijek) is a Croatian rower.
