= Sead Marušić =

Croatian rower

Personal information
- Nationality: Croatian
- Born: 15 December 1965 (age 59); Split, Yugoslavia

Sport
- Sport: Rowing

Sead Marušić (born 15 December 1965) is a Croatian rower. He competed at the 1988 Summer Olympics, 1992 Summer Olympics and the 1996 Summer Olympics.
