= Rowing at the 2008 Summer Olympics – Women's eight =

Women's eight at the Games of the XXIX Olympiad

Medalists
1st place, gold medalist(s)		Erin Cafaro; Lindsay Shoop; Anna Goodale; Elle Logan; Anna Cummins; Susan Francia; Caroline Lind; Caryn Davies cox: Mary Whipple	United States
2nd place, silver medalist(s)		Femke Dekker; Marlies Smulders; Nienke Kingma; Roline Repelaer van Driel; Annemarieke van Rumpt; Helen Tanger; Sarah Siegelaar; Annemiek de Haan cox: Ester Workel	Netherlands
3rd place, bronze medalist(s)		Constanța Burcică; Viorica Susanu; Rodica Şerban; Enikő Barabás; Simona Muşat; Ioana Papuc; Georgeta Andrunache; Doina Ignat cox: Elena Georgescu	Romania

Women's eight competition at the 2008 Summer Olympics in Beijing was held on August 11 (heats), 13 (Repechage) and 17 (Final A), at the Shunyi Olympic Rowing-Canoeing Park.

This rowing event is a sweep rowing event, meaning that each rower has one oar and rows on only one side. Eight rowers and one coxswain crew each boat. The seven teams competing are placed into two heats, of four and three boats each. The fastest boat in each of those heats moves directly on to the final, while the rest of the boats are sent to the repechage. The repechage is a single heat, with the top four of the five boats advancing to the final. The repechage loser is given an overall rank of 7th place, last in the event. The other six boats, competing in the final, are ranked according to their finish in the final.

== Schedule ==
All times are China Standard Time (UTC+8)

Date	Time	Round
Monday, August 11, 2008	14:50-15:10	Heats
Wednesday, August 13, 2008	17:40-17:50	Repechage
Sunday, August 17, 2008	17:10-17:20	Final A

== Results ==
=== Heats ===
Qualification Rules: 1->FA, 2..->R

==== Heat 1 ====
Rank	Rowers	Country	Time	Notes
1	Cafaro, Shoop, Goodale, Logan, Cummins, Francia, Lind, Davies, Whipple	United States	6:06.53	FA
2	Ashford, Rodford, Page, Howard, Eddie, Winckless, Knowles, Greves, O'Connor	Great Britain	6:08.68	R
3	Mandoli, Morin, Bonikowsky, Brzozowicz, Stefancic, Williams, Marquardt, Rumball, Thompson-Willie	Canada	6:12.68	R
4	Hennings, Reinert, Wengert, Schmutzler, Wech, Derlien, Zimmermann, Hipler, Ruppel	Germany	6:14.42	R

==== Heat 2 ====
Rank	Rowers	Country	Time	Notes
1	Burcică, Susanu, Şerban, Barabas, Musat, Papuc, Andrunache, Ignat, Georgescu	Romania	6:05.77	FA
2	Dekker, Smulders, Kingma, Repelaer van Driel, van Rumpt, Tanger, Siegelaar, de Haan, Workel	Netherlands	6:07.41	R
3	Frasca, Pratley, Kehoe, Bale, Kell, Hornsey, Tait, Heard, Patrick	Australia	6:07.93	R

=== Repechage ===
Qualification Rules: 1-4 ->FA

Rank	Rowers	Country	Time	Notes
1	Mandoli, Morin, Bonikowsky, Brzozowicz, Stefancic, Williams, Marquardt, Rumball, Thompson-Willie	Canada	6:10.50	FA
2	Dekker, Smulders, Kingma, Repelaer van Driel, van Rumpt, Tanger, Siegelaar, de Haan, Workel	Netherlands	6:11.58	FA
3	Ashford, Rodford, Page, Howard, Eddie, Winckless, Knowles, Greves, O'Connor	Great Britain	6:12.10	FA
4	Frasca, Pratley, Kehoe, Bale, Kell, Hornsey, Tait, Heard, Patrick	Australia	6:12.52	FA
5	Hennings, Reinert, Wengert, Schmutzler, Wech, Derlien, Zimmermann, Hipler, Ruppel	Germany	6:14.45	

=== Final A ===
Rank	Rowers	Country	Time	Notes
Gold medal	Cafaro, Shoop, Goodale, Logan, Cummins, Francia, Lind, Davies, Whipple	United States	6:05.34	
Silver medal	Dekker, Smulders, Kingma, Repelaer van Driel, van Rumpt, Tanger, Siegelaar, de Haan, Workel	Netherlands	6:07.22	
Bronze medal	Burcică, Susanu, Şerban, Barabás, Muşat, Papuc, Andrunache, Ignat, Georgescu	Romania	6:07.25	
4	Mandoli, Morin, Bonikowsky, Brzozowicz, Stefancic, Williams, Marquardt, Rumball, Thompson-Willie	Canada	6:08.04	
5	Ashford, Rodford, Page, Howard, Eddie, Winckless, Knowles, Greves, O'Connor (substitutes to be named)	Great Britain	6:13.74	
6	Frasca, Pratley, Kehoe, Bale, Kell, Hornsey, Tait, Heard, Patrick	Australia	6:14.22	
