= Sarah Bonikowsky =

Canadian rower (born 1982)

Personal information
- Nationality: Canada
- Born: August 23, 1982 (age 43) Orangeville, Ontario

Sport
- Club: University of Victoria
Medal record
Women's rowing
Representing Canada
Pan American Games
| Bronze medal – third place | 2011 Guadalajara | Coxless pair |

Sarah Bonikowsky (born August 23, 1982) is a Canadian rower. She was born in Orangeville, Ontario and graduated from the University of Victoria with a Bachelor of Arts, majoring in philosophy with a minor in Greek and Roman studies.

She finished in fourth place at the 2008 Summer Olympic Games in Beijing, China in the women's eights with Ashley Brzozowicz, Darcy Marquardt, Buffy-Lynne Williams, Jane Thornton, Romina Stefancic, Andréanne Morin, Heather Mandoli and cox Lesley Thompson-Willie.
