= Anna Goodale =

American rower (born 1983)

Personal information
- Born: March 18, 1983 (age 43) Montville, Maine, U.S.
- Home town: Camden, Maine, U.S.
- Education: Syracuse University

Sport
- Country: United States
- Sport: Rowing
- College team: Syracuse Orange (2001–2005)
Medal record
Women's rowing
Representing the United States
Olympic Games
Gold medal – first place	2008 Beijing	Women's eight
World Championships
Gold medal – first place	2006 Eton	Eight
Gold medal – first place	2007 Munich	Eight
Gold medal – first place	2009 Poznan	Eight
Gold medal – first place	2010 Cambridge	Eight

Anna P. Goodale (born March 18, 1983) is an American rower. She has rowed on four world championship U.S. women's eight crews and competed at the 2008 Summer Olympics, where she won a gold medal in women's eight.

== Early life and education ==
Anna Goodale was born to Martha Derbyshire and Nat Goodale in Montville, Maine. She spent most of her time on a sheep farm and was homeschooled until age nine. Goodale is a great-great-granddaughter of James H. Smith Jr. and Pauline Sabin and of Yale athlete Tom Shevlin. She attended Camden Hills Regional High School and graduated from Syracuse University in 2005. She studied illustration at Syracuse and is skilled in using a range of mediums, with a focus on watercolor and pastel. She also enjoys playing the viola.

== Career ==
=== College ===
At Syracuse, Goodale was a member of the varsity eight team and received various awards and honors for her rowing achievements, including being named three time Collegiate Rowing Coaches Association All-American, earning first team distinctions in 2003 and 2005, and a second team honor in 2004.

Beginning as a walk-on, by senior year, she had become the team captain and won the Soladay Award, the most prestigious award given to a student-athlete by Syracuse Athletics.

=== Olympics ===
Goodale joined the United States National Women's Rowing Team in 2005. At the international level, she has won gold in the eight event multiple times at the World Rowing Championships, World Rowing Cup, and the Olympic Games. She has also placed in the pair event at various Rowing World Cup stops, won silver in the eight at the 2006 World Rowing Cup in Lucerne, and won the Remenham Cup at the 2006 Henley Royal Regatta. She has also finished in the top 4 in the eight event at the 2005 World Rowing Championships. She won a gold medal in women's eight at the 2008 Summer Olympics.

Goodale has had a successful career in national rowing competitions. She has placed in the top four in several pair events, including finishing fourth at the 2010 National Selection Regatta #3 and sixth at the 2010 National Selection Regatta #2. In addition, Goodale has also had several notable finishes in the championship eight event, including winning gold at the 2006, 2005, and 2009 Head of the Charles Regattas, and coming in second place at the 2009 USRowing National Championships. Goodale has also had success in other events, such as winning silver in the four at the 2007 USRowing National Championships and finishing second in the four at the 2004 U.S. Senior and Junior World Championship Trials.

Goodale announced in June 2011 that she was officially retired from rowing and planned to move to Ecuador with her father.

=== Coaching ===
In 2014, Goodale spent the 2014–15 school year as an assistant coach for the rowing team at Gonzaga University in Spokane, Washington. During the 2015 NCAA Championships, the Gonzaga Bulldogs achieved their best-ever team finish of 17th place.

Goodale served as the assistant coach and the head novice coach for Ohio State University's Women's Rowing Team from Fall 2015 until 2019.

Since 2019, she has served as the head coach and executive director of the Megunticook Rowing club in Camden, Maine.

== Honors ==
She was inducted into the Maine Sports Hall of Fame in 2015 and the Midcoast Sports Hall of Fame in 2011.

She was the first women to have her number retired at Syracuse — along with basketball legend Felisha Legette-Jack and lacrosse player Katie Rowan Thomson.

== Personal life ==
Goodale is married to Wes Walker, who was an assistant volleyball coach at Eastern Washington University. She has two sons.

== See also ==
- Erin Cafaro
- Anna (Mickelson) Cummins
- Caryn Davies
- Susan Francia
- Caroline Lind
- Elle Logan
- Lindsay Shoop
- Mary Whipple
