= Caryn Davies =

American rower (born 1982)

- Davies at Pembroke College, Oxford

Personal information
- Born: April 14, 1982 (age 44) Ithaca, New York, U.S.
Medal record
Women's rowing
Representing the United States
Olympic Games
Gold medal – first place	2008 Beijing	Women's eight
Gold medal – first place	2012 London	Women's eight
Silver medal – second place	2004 Athens	Women's eight
World Rowing Championships
Gold medal – first place	2002 Seville	Women's eight
Gold medal – first place	2003 Milan	Women's four w/o cox
Gold medal – first place	2006 Eton, UK	Women's eight
Gold medal – first place	2007 Munich	Women's eight
World Rowing Cup
Gold medal – first place	2004 Munich	Women's eight
Gold medal – first place	2004 Lucerne	Women's eight
Gold medal – first place	2008 Lucerne	Women's eight
Gold medal – first place	2011 Lucerne	Women's eight
Gold medal – first place	2012 Lucerne	Women's eight
Silver medal – second place	2006 Lucerne	Women's eight
Bronze medal – third place	2004 Munich	Women's pair
Bronze medal – third place	2005 Munich	Women's quad sculls

Caryn Davies (born April 14, 1982) is an American rower. She is the winner of the 2023 Thomas Keller Medal, the most prestigious international award in the sport of rowing, and the only American to have ever won this award. She won gold medals as the stroke seat of the U.S. women's eight at the 2012 Summer Olympics and the 2008 Summer Olympics. In April 2015 Davies stroked Oxford University to victory in the first ever women's Oxford/Cambridge boat race held on the same stretch of the river Thames in London where the men's Oxford/Cambridge race has been held since 1829. She was the most highly decorated Olympian to take part in either (men's or women's) race. In 2012 Davies was ranked number 4 in the world by the International Rowing Federation. At the 2004 Olympic Games she won a silver medal in the women's eight. Davies has won more Olympic medals than any other U.S. oarswoman. The 2008 U.S. women's eight, of which she was a part, was named FISA (International Rowing Federation) crew of the year. Davies is from Ithaca, New York, where she graduated from Ithaca High School, and rowed with the Cascadilla Boat Club. Davies was on the Radcliffe College (Harvard) Crew Team and was a member on Radcliffe's 2003 NCAA champion Varsity 8, and overall team champion. In 2013, she was a visiting student at Pembroke College, Oxford, where she stroked the college men's eight to a victory in both Torpids (spring intercollegiate races) and the Oxford University Summer Eights races (for the first time in Oxford rowing history). In 2013–14 Davies took up Polynesian outrigger canoeing in Hawaii, winning the State novice championship and placing 4th in the long-distance race Na Wahine O Ke Kai with her team from the Outrigger Canoe Club. In 2013, she was inducted into the New York Athletic Club Hall of Fame and in 2022 into the Harvard University Athletics Hall of Fame.

Caryn Davies was elected president of the United States Olympians and Paralympians Association (USOPA) in 2021. She previously served as a vice president from 2008-2012 and 2016-2019 . She also served as athlete representative to the USRowing Board of Directors from 2004-2010.

Davies has a degree from Harvard University (A.B. Psychology, 2005), a J.D. (Doctor of Law) from Columbia Law School (2013) and an MBA from Oxford University (2015). Davies is the most decorated Harvard Olympian in the sport of rowing. During 2013–2014, Davies served as a clerk to Judge Richard Clifton of the U.S. Court of Appeals for the 9th Circuit in Honolulu, Hawaii. She was an attorney with Goodwin Procter in Boston, Massachusetts from 2015-2019, and is now an attorney in private practice.

== Early career ==
Davies was recruited into rowing at 12 years of age. She started rowing competitively a year later in Australia in 1996, at the Friends' School in Hobart. A local rowing club also recruited her into single sculling, where groups of teenagers launched off a beach into tidal estuarine waters. Within six months she was the Tasmanian under-15 single sculls champion. Returning from Australia she continued with Cascadilla Boat Club and the Ithaca High School rowing team. In 1998, as a 16-year-old she competed in the world's biggest rowing race, the Head of the Charles in Boston. Because she had already placed in the top three in a junior race at the Canadian Henley the summer before the race, officials insisted on placing her, as the only junior, into the championship category of top senior international rowers; she put up a creditable performance by placing 16th. The following summer (1999) she made her first national team, coming second in the US junior eight in Plovdiv, Bulgaria, followed by a gold medal in a four at the junior world championships in Zagreb, Croatia, in 2000, the first gold medal ever by US Junior women. She also won the prestigious Stotesbury cup regatta and the Scholastic Rowing Association single sculls in both 1999 and 2000, and the USRowing Youth invitational in 2000, placing her as the top US junior female rower at the time she left high school. Caryn's brother Kenneth also represented the US as a junior rower, and well as rowing at Cornell University, achieving the position of Commodore of the Cornell Crew in his senior year and receiving All Ivy Academic Honors for all four years.

== College and world championships ==
Davies rowed for Harvard from 2001 to 2003, leading the team to an NCAA championship in 2003, and again in 2005, after taking a year off for the Olympics. She has again taken a year off from Columbia Law School to compete in 2012. Most national team training has been based in Princeton, New Jersey, where the US women's team shares a boathouse and a lake with Princeton University, whereas winter training was based in San Diego.

Davies has the ability to row starboard, port, or scull at an international level. At 6' 4" she was the tallest member of the U.S. Women's National Team. She was part of the U.S. Olympic women's eight that set a world record in the heat prior to a silver medal in the final in Athens, Greece. She was stroking the eight that repeated the feat in the World Cup in Lucerne in May 2012. As the most experienced oarsperson on the U.S. women's team she acted as a guiding figure: "Remember it's just like the World Championships – the same people doing the same thing – but with more flags."

As of 2019, Davies has won the C.R.A.S.H-Bs three times: first as a junior in 2000, next in the open category in 2005, and in 2019 (at a rowing age of 37), she again won the open category. She serves as the athlete demonstrating rowing technique in video for the Concept II rowing-machine. Davies also promotes youth fitness through World Fit and gives inspirational talks to youth groups.

Davies' hobbies include travel, sailing, downhill skiing, horseback riding, yoga, and ballroom dancing. In high school, she competed for several years in competitive downhill skiing, reaching a 7th place in giant slalom in New York State. As a senior at Harvard, she competed on the ballroom team.

== Competitive history ==
=== International results ===
- 2019: World Rowing Championships, Linz-Ottensheim, Austria, women's four, 6th
- 2012: Olympic Games, London, England, women's eight, 1st (rowing stroke) gold medal
- 2012: Samsung World Rowing Cup II, Lucerne, women's eight, 1st, rowing stroke; world record (5:54.17 in the heat) no longer world record.
- 2011: FISA World Championships, women's pair, 8th
- 2011: FISA World Cup, Lucerne, women's eight, 1st
- 2011: Henley Royal Regatta, won the Princess Grace Challenge Cup (women's quadruple sculls)
- 2008: Olympic Games, Beijing, China, women's eight, 1st (rowing stroke) gold medal
- 2008: FISA World Cup, Lucerne, women's eight, 1st
- 2007: FISA World Championships, Munich, women's eight, 1st (rowing stroke)
- 2006: FISA World Championships, Lake Dorney, UK, women's eight, 1st (rowing stroke)
- 2006: FISA World Cup, Lucerne, women's eight, 2nd
- 2006: Henley Royal Regatta, won Remenham Cup (women's eight)
- 2005: FISA World Championships, women's quadruple sculls, 5th
- 2005: Bearing Point World Cup, Munich, women's quadruple sculls, 3rd
- 2004: Olympic Games, Athens, women's eight 2nd silver medal
- 2004: FISA World Cup, Munich, women's eight 1st
- 2004: FISA World Cup, Munich, women's pair 3rd
- 2004: FISA World Cup, Lucerne, women's eight 1st
- 2003: FISA World Championships, Milano, Italy, women's four without cox 1st
- 2002: FISA World Championships, Seville, Spain, women's eight 1st

=== Junior international ===
- 2000: FISA Junior World Championships, Zagreb, Croatia, junior women's four without cox. 1st
- 1999: FISA Junior World Championships, Plovdiv, Bulgaria, junior women's eight, 2nd

=== C.R.A.S.H.-Bs: World Indoor Rowing Championship ===
- 2019, C.R.A.S.H.-B. Indoor Sprints, women (open), 1st
- 2005, C.R.A.S.H.-B. Indoor Championships, women's collegiate open weight, 1st
- 2000, C.R.A.S.H.-B. Indoor Championships, junior women, 1st

=== National results ===
- 2015: Stroked Oxford University women's eight to a win over Cambridge in the first ever Oxford/Cambridge Women's Boat Race on the River Thames
- 2013: Stroked Oxford University women's eight to a win in the British University Rowing Championships
- 2013: Stroked Pembroke College Oxford men's eight to wins in Oxford University Torpids and Summer Eights
- 2006: Australian National Championships, women's senior A four, 2nd
- 2006: Australian National Championships, women's senior A quadruple sculls, 3rd
- 2005: Head of the Charles, women's double sculls, 1st
- 2005: NCAA Championships, women's varsity eight, 3rd
- 2003: NCAA Championships, women's varsity eight, 1st

=== Junior national ===
- 2000: USRowing Youth Invitational, junior women's single sculls champion
- 2000: Scholastic Rowing Association of America women's single sculls champion
- 2000: Stotesbury Regatta (juniors) women's single sculls champion
- 1999: Scholastic Rowing Association of America women's single sculls champion
- 1999: Stotesbury Regatta (juniors) women's single sculls champion
- 1997: State of Tasmania (Australia) under 15 girls single sculls champion

== See also ==
- Erin Cafaro
- Anna Mickelson
- Susan Francia
- Anna Goodale
- Caroline Lind
- Elle Logan
- Lindsay Shoop
- Mary Whipple
- Kate Johnson
