= Romina Stefancic =

Slovenian-Canadian rower (born 1978)

Personal information
- Full name: Romina Stefancic
- Nationality: Canadian
- Born: July 21, 1978 (age 47) Slovenia

Sport
- Sport: Swimming
- Club: University of Victoria

Romina Stefancic (born July 21, 1978) is a Slovenian-Canadian rower. Born in Slovenia, she received Canadian citizenship in 2004, prior to competing in the 2004 Summer Olympics.

She finished in fourth place at the 2008 Summer Olympic Games in Beijing, China in the women's eights with Ashley Brzozowicz, Darcy Marquardt, Buffy-Lynne Williams, Jane Thornton, Sarah Bonikowsky, Andréanne Morin, Heather Mandoli and cox Lesley Thompson-Willie.
