= Heather Mandoli =

Canadian rower (born 1982)

Personal information
- Nationality: Canadian
- Born: October 25, 1982 (age 43) Kelowna, British Columbia, Canada

Sport
- Country: Canada
- Sport: Rowing
- Club: Western Rowing Club, Kelowna Rowing Club

Heather Mandoli (born October 25, 1982, in Kelowna, British Columbia) is a Canadian rower.

She finished in fourth place at the 2008 Summer Olympic Games in Beijing, China in the women's eights with Ashley Brzozowicz, Darcy Marquardt, Buffy-Lynne Williams, Jane Thornton, Romina Stefancic, Sarah Bonikowsky, Andréanne Morin and cox Lesley Thompson-Willie.
