= Mary Whipple =

American rower

Personal information
- Born: Mary Rebecca Whipple; May 10, 1980 (age 46) Sacramento, California, U.S.
Medal record
Women's rowing
Representing the United States
Olympic Games
Gold medal – first place	2008 Beijing	Women's eight
Gold medal – first place	2012 London	Women's eight
Silver medal – second place	2004 Athens	Women's eight
World Championships
Gold medal – first place	2002 Seville	Women's eight
Gold medal – first place	2006 Eton	Women's eight
Gold medal – first place	2007 Munich	Women's eight
Gold medal – first place	2010 Karapiro	Women's eight
Gold medal – first place	2011 Lake Bled	Women's eight

Mary Rebecca Whipple (born May 10, 1980) is an American coxswain famous for winning a gold medal in women's eight at the 2012 Summer Olympics and at the 2008 Summer Olympics. She also competed at the 2004 Summer Olympics where she won a silver medal. As a coxswain, Whipple stands 5 ft 3 in (1.60 m) and weighs in at 108 lb (49 kg).

As a freshman at the University of Washington, Mary coxed the women's varsity four to a national title in 1999. She coxed the varsity eight to victory at the Henley Royal Regatta in 2000, taking home the first-ever Henley Prize, while also coxing them to a silver medal in the NCAA championships as part of a second-place finish in the team standings that year. In 2001 and 2002, Mary coxed the varsity eight to back-to-back NCAA championships, and the Huskies also took home the team title in 2001.

Mary has an identical twin sister Sarah Jeanine Whipple. Sarah was an assistant coach for Women's Crew at the University of California at Berkeley and was the Varsity Women's Head Coach at Capital Crew in Sacramento, California and has led the team to several US Rowing Regional and National Championship regattas.

== See also ==
- Kate Johnson
- Erin Cafaro
- Anna (Mickelson) Cummins
- Caryn Davies
- Susan Francia
- Anna Goodale
- Caroline Lind
- Elle Logan
- Lindsay Shoop
