= Caroline Lind =

American rower

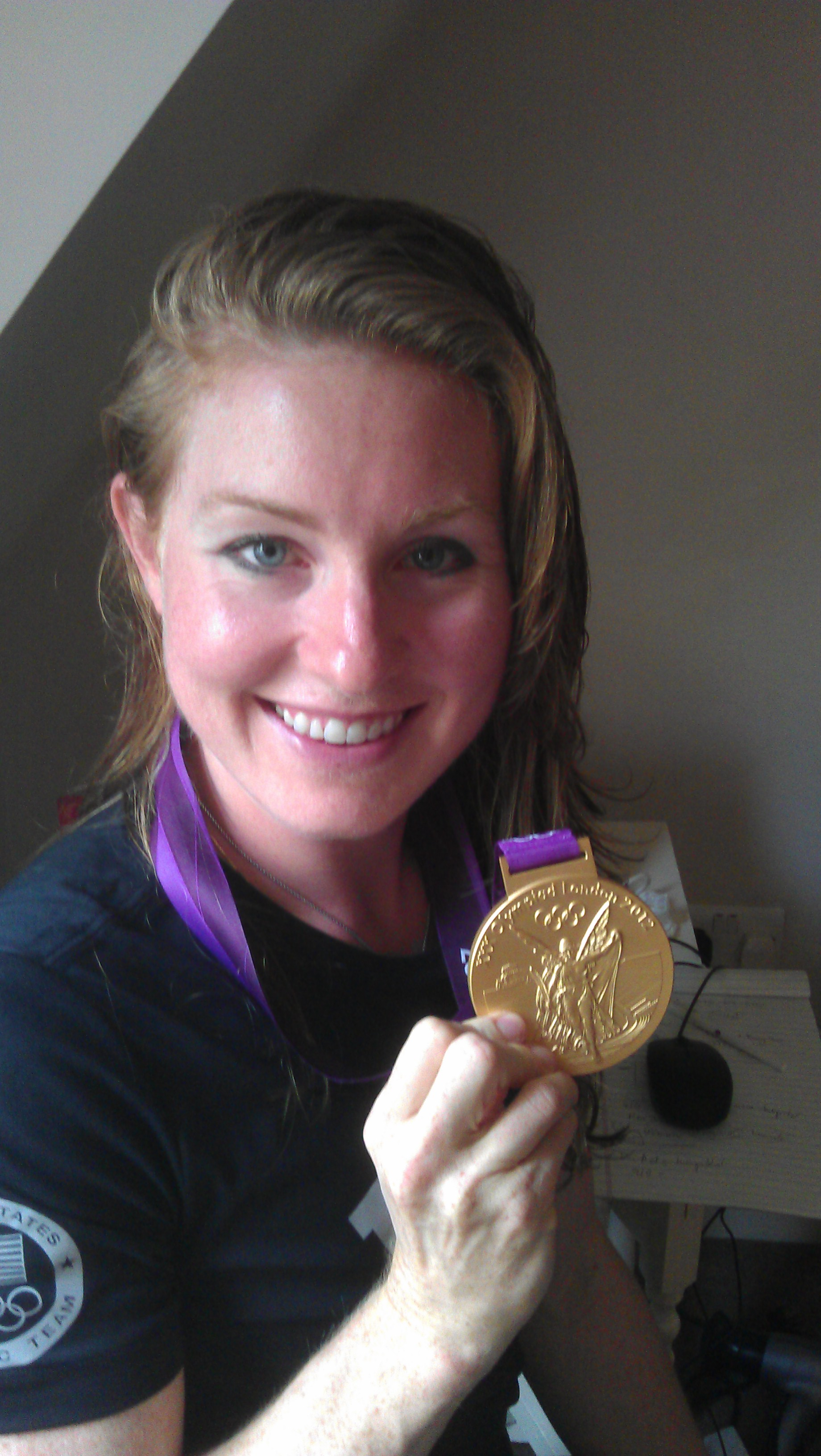
- Lind with her gold medal from the 2012 Olympics

Personal information
- Born: October 11, 1982 (age 44) Greensboro, North Carolina, U.S.
- Height: 6 ft 0 in (183 cm)
- Weight: 175 lb (79 kg)

Sport
- Country: United States
- Sport: Rowing
- College team: Princeton University
- Club: USRowing Training Center
- Coached by: Tom Terhaar
Medal record
Women’s Rowing
Representing the United States
Olympic Games
Gold medal – first place	2008 Beijing	Women's eight
Gold medal – first place	2012 London	Women's eight
World Championships
Gold medal – first place	2006 Eton	W8+
Gold medal – first place	2007 Munich	W8+
Gold medal – first place	2009 Poznań	W8+
Gold medal – first place	2011 Bled	W8+
Gold medal – first place	2013 Chungju	W8+
Gold medal – first place	2014 Amsterdam	W8+

Caroline Lind (born October 11, 1982) is an American rower, and is a two-time Olympic gold medalist. At the end of 2014 she was ranked #1 female rower by International Rowing Federation.

== Rowing career ==
Lind won gold in the Women's eight for the US in the 2012 Olympics and 2008 Olympics. She has been a member of the W8+ boat in World competitions since 2006. At the 2008 Summer Olympics in Beijing, Lind won a gold medal as a member of the women's eight team. It was the first gold medal for the American women's eight team since 1984. Four years later at the 2012 Summer Olympics in London, Lind again won gold as a member of the women's eight team. She has won World Championship titles in 2006, 2007, 2009, 2011, 2013, and 2014 in the Women's eight. In 2014, Lind with her W8+ teammates from 2008 Olympics was inducted into the US Rowing Hall of Fame. In 2014, Lind was named Athlete of the Year by the New York Athletic Club. She featured in an article by the International Rowing Federation (FISA) on how the pain barrier is broken in competitive rowing.

== Education and background ==
Lind graduated from Phillips Academy in 2002. In 2003, she became a national debutante, at The National Debutante Cotillion and Thanksgiving Ball in Washington, D.C. She graduated from Princeton University in 2006 with an A.B. in anthropology after completing a 202-page senior thesis, titled "Flow in Rowing", under the supervision of Carolyn M. Rouse. At Princeton, Lind received the C. Otto von Kienbusch Sportswoman of the Year Award, given to a Princeton senior woman of high scholastic rank who has demonstrated general proficiency in athletics and qualities of a true sportswoman, as well as the Carol P. Brown Senior Woman Award by her Princeton teammates for being a source of inspiration, dedication, and perseverance in pursuit of excellence. Lind pursued an M.B.A. with an accounting concentration at Rider University, in Lawrenceville, New Jersey, graduating in December 2010.

== See also ==
- List of Princeton University Olympians
- Erin Cafaro
- Anna (Mickelson) Cummins
- Caryn Davies
- Susan Francia
- Anna Goodale
- Elle Logan
- Lindsay Shoop
- Mary Whipple
