= Lindsay Shoop =

American rower (born 1981)

Personal information
- Born: September 25, 1981 (age 44) Charlottesville, Virginia, U.S.
- Height: 6 ft 1 in (1.85 m)

Sport
- Country: United States
- Event: Women's Eight
Medal record
Women's rowing
Representing the United States
Olympic Games
Gold medal – first place	2008 Beijing	Women's eight
World Championships
Gold medal – first place	2006 Eton	Women's eight
Gold medal – first place	2007 Munich	Women's eight
Gold medal – first place	2009 Poznań	Women's eight
World Rowing Cup
Bronze medal – third place	2005	Women's eight
Silver medal – second place	2006	Women's eight
Gold medal – first place	2007	Women's eight
Gold medal – first place	2008	Women's eight
Silver medal – second place	2009	Women's eight

Lindsay Shoop (born September 25, 1981) is an American rower. She competed at the 2008 Summer Olympics, where she won a gold medal in the women's eight. She rowed at the University of Virginia (UVA).

Shoop was born in Charlottesville, Virginia. In the spring semester of her junior year at UVA, Shoop joined the rowing team, an event that marked the beginning of her career as a rower. After graduating with a degree in Spanish (and a minor in art history), she competed at UVA for three spring seasons.

In 2004, she moved to Princeton, New Jersey to train with the national team coaches. After spending the first 8 months at the training center rowing a single, she eventually moved back into sweep boats in the spring of 2005.

That summer Shoop competed in both the pair and eight, which placed 6th and 4th respectively at the World Championships in Gifu, Japan.

Over the next four years, Shoop was part of the World Champion Women's Eights of 2006, 2007, and 2009. The Eight of 2006 set a World Record at 5:55.5 in Eton, England and was Henley Royal Regatta champion, setting that course record as well. In 2008, Shoop sat 2-seat in the Olympic Champion Women's Eight, bringing home the first American Rowing Olympic Gold in 24 years, and the only gold at the full 2,000 meter distance.

From 2005 on, Shoop also competed at 8 World Cups in the pair, eight, or both, medaling 5 times. She also medaled at the Head of the Charles Regatta 3 times and was part of the crew that set the Charles course record in 2007. During those years, she competed in numerous Selection Regattas and National Championship Events, winning a few of each.

In 2012, Shoop took the job as assistant men's rowing coach at Pine Crest School in Florida, and took over the entire rowing organization in 2013. She left Pine Crest in the spring of 2014 to accomplish other life goals.

In the summer of 2021, Shoop was paired alongside Brendan Burke for rowing in the 2020 Tokyo Olympics. She returned as an analyst for the 2024 Paris Olympics.

== See also ==
- Erin Cafaro
- Anna (Mickelson) Cummins
- Caryn Davies
- Susan Francia
- Anna Goodale
- Caroline Lind
- Elle Logan
- Mary Whipple
