= Erin Cafaro =

American rower (born 1983)

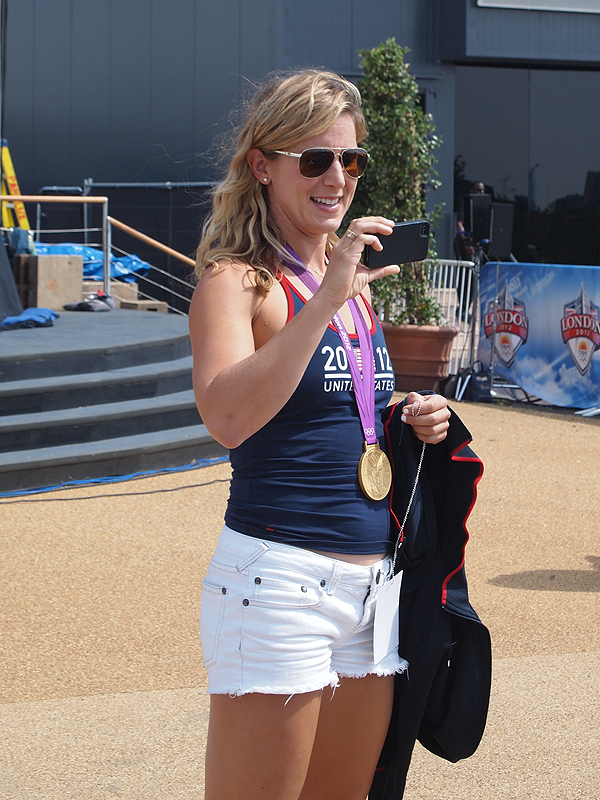
- Cafaro in London, 2012

Personal information
- Full name: Erin Jane Cafaro
- Born: June 9, 1983 (age 43) Modesto, California, U.S.
- Height: 175 cm (5 ft 9 in)

Sport
- Country: United States
- Sport: Rowing
- Event: Women's Eight
Medal record
Women's rowing
Representing the United States
Olympic Games
Gold medal – first place	2008 Beijing	Eight
Gold medal – first place	2012 London	Eight
World Championships
Gold medal – first place	2007 Munich	Coxless four
Gold medal – first place	2009 Poznan	Eight
Gold medal – first place	2009 Poznan	Pair
Bronze medal – third place	2006 Eton	Coxless four
Bronze medal – third place	2010 Karapiro	Pair

Erin Jane Cafaro (born June 9, 1983) is an American rower. She competed at the 2008 Summer Olympics, where she won a gold medal in the women's eight. At the 2012 London Olympics she won her second consecutive gold medal in the women's eight.

== Career ==
Cafaro began her rowing career as a novice at the University of California, Berkeley in 2001. She went on to make the NCAA team her freshman year, and to win the Women's NCAA Rowing Championships in both 2005 and 2006. In the summer of 2005, Cafaro competed for US Rowing U23 Team in the Women's 4- at the Amsterdam, Netherlands FISA U23 World Championships, where the team won gold.

Starting in the summer of 2006 Cafaro began training full-time with the US Rowing National Team. She won a bronze medal in Eton, England at the FISA World Rowing Championships in 2006 and a gold medal in Munich, Germany at the FISA World Rowing Championships in 2007, both in the Women's 4- event.

Cafaro competed for the United States in the 2008 Olympic Games in Beijing, China, and 2012 Olympic Games in London, England where she and her teammates brought home the gold medals in the Women's 8+ event. Beijing was the first time the United States Olympic Team has won the gold in the Women's 8+ event in the full 2000m race.

In 2009 Cafaro won gold medals both in the Women's 2- and 8+ events at the 2009 World Rowing Championships in Poznan, Poland. This was the first time in US Rowing history that the W2- pair has won the gold medal in an international championship, much less two gold medals in two Olympic events in the same year at the same regatta. Cafaro and her pair partner, Susan Francia were awarded 2009 FISA World Crew of the Year for their performances at the World Rowing Championships, as well as being named USA Today's Athletes of the Month. Erin was also awarded the Female Athlete of the Year award for 2009 by her teammates and coaches on the US Rowing National Team.

During her training in the 2008 Olympic year, Cafaro discovered CrossFit, and incorporated the training ideologies, concepts and workouts into her full-time, year round rowing program. Starting 2009 Cafaro started touring the world as a Crossfit Rowing Subject Matter Expert for Concept 2, coaching CrossFit coaches and athletes on their technique and training on the Concept 2 ergometer.

After retiring from rowing in 2012, Cafaro became VP of Operations for 3Fu3l, a startup sports supplement company. She transitioned into coaching full-time for Concept 2 and Unscared, Inc. starting 2014. In 2014 Cafaro and human performance coach and NYT Best Selling Author Brian MacKenzie created the sports performance company Power Speed Endurance in 2016. Cafaro managed operations for PSE for 2 years.

Cafaro pivoted away from the sports performance world into the research and mental wellness space beginning of 2018. She began as a Clinical Coordinator on a research project on fear, anxiety and therapeutic interventions at the Huberman Lab in the Stanford School of Medicine Dept. of Neurobiology. Currently, Cafaro is a doctoral student in clinical psychology at The Wright Institute in Berkeley, CA specializing in neuropsychology.

== See also ==
- Anna (Mickelson) Cummins
- Caryn Davies
- Susan Francia
- Anna Goodale
- Caroline Lind
- Elle Logan
- Lindsay Shoop
- Mary Whipple
