= Ashley Brzozowicz =

Canadian rower (born 1982)

Personal information
- Born: December 17, 1982 (age 43) Toronto, Ontario, Canada

Sport
- Sport: Rowing
- Club: Western Rowing Club
Medal record
Women's rowing
Representing Canada
Olympic Games
Silver medal – second place	2012 London	Women's eights
World Championships
Silver medal – second place	2011 Lake Bled	W8+
Silver medal – second place	2014 Amsterdam	W8+
Bronze medal – third place	2015 Aiguebelette	W8+

Ashley Brzozowicz (born December 17, 1982) is a Canadian rower. She was raised in London, Ontario. Her rowing career began as a sophomore at St. Ignatius College Prep in Chicago. She graduated from Yale University with a Bachelor of Arts degree in History of Art.

Brzozowicz finished second at the NCAA championships in 2004.

Brzozowicz finished in fourth place at the 2008 Summer Olympics in Beijing, China in the women's eights with Jane Thornton, Darcy Marquardt, Buffy-Lynne Williams, Sarah Bonikowsky, Romina Stefancic, Andréanne Morin, Heather Mandoli and cox Lesley Thompson-Willie.

At the 2012 Summer Olympics in London, Brzozowicz won a silver medal in the Women's eights.
