= Anna Mickelson =

American rower (born 1980)

Anna Cummins
Personal information
- Born: Anna Mickelson; March 21, 1980 (age 46) Seattle, Washington, U.S.
Medal record
Women's rowing
Representing the United States
Olympic Games
Gold medal – first place	2008 Beijing	Women's eight
Silver medal – second place	2004 Athens	Women's eight
World Championships
Gold medal – first place	2002 Seville	Women's eight
Gold medal – first place	2006 Eton	Women's eight

Anna Cummins (née Mickelson, born March 21, 1980) is an American rower who won a gold medal at the 2008 Summer Olympics and a silver medal at the 2004 Summer Olympics in the women's eight. At the FISA World Rowing Championships in 2006, Mickelson won the gold medal in the women's eight with a new world's best time of 5:55.50, and with partner Megan Cooke, she placed 4th in the women's pair. At the FISA World Rowing Championships in 2007, Mickelson won the gold medal again in the women's eight and won the "B" final in the women's pair.

She rowed in the women's pairs and women's eights at the 2008 Summer Olympics. She won a gold medal in the eights with a time of 6:05.34. The Dutch team won a silver medal with a time of 6:07.22. The Romanian team won a bronze medal with a time of 6:07.25. Other finalists were Canada (fourth), Great Britain (fifth), and Australia (sixth).

Anna grew up in Bellevue, Washington. She graduated from Newport High School. In high school, she ran varsity cross country and track; she played varsity basketball. She attended the University of Washington where she began rowing. She was a member of Washington's Varsity Eight (first boat) which finished second at NCAA Championships in 2000 and won the NCAA Championship in 2001 and 2002. Washington also won the team championship in 2001. She also won an NCAA championship in 1999 in the Varsity Four (third boat), her first year of rowing. She graduated from the University of Washington with a bachelor's degree in communications. She married Dr. Bob Cummins on December 22, 2007.

== See also ==
- Kate Johnson
- Erin Cafaro
- Megan Cooke
- Caryn Davies
- Susan Francia
- Anna Goodale
- Caroline Lind
- Elle Logan
- Lindsay Shoop
- Mary Whipple
