= Siegelaar =

Siegelaar is a surname. Notable people with the surname include:

- Olivier Siegelaar (born 1986), Dutch rower
- Sarah Siegelaar (born 1981), Dutch rower
