= Caroline O'Connor =

Caroline O'Connor may refer to:

- Caroline O'Connor (actress) (born 1962), English-Australian singer, dancer and actress
- Caroline O'Connor (rowing) (born 1983), British rowing cox
