= Brooke Pratley =

Australian rower (born 1980)

Personal information
- Born: 6 April 1980 (age 46)
- Years active: 2003-2012

Sport
- Sport: Rowing
- Club: Sydney Uni Women's BC

Achievements and titles
- Olympic finals: Beijing 2008 W8+
Medal record
Women's rowing
Representing Australia
Olympic Games
| Silver medal – second place | 2012 London | Double sculls |
World Rowing Championships
| Gold medal – first place | 2006 Eton | W2x |

Brooke Pratley (born 6 April 1980 in Goulburn, New South Wales) is an Australian former rower. She is an Australian national champion, a world champion, a dual Olympian and an Olympic medal-winner. Together with Kim Crow, she won a silver medal at the 2012 Olympic Games in London.

== Club and state rowing ==
Pratley's senior club rowing was done from the Sydney University Women's Boat Club. She was awarded a scholarship to the Australian Institute of Sport prior to the 2008 Olympics.

Pratley made New South Wales made state selection contesting the Women's Interstate Sculling Championship (the Nell Slatter Trophy) at the Australian Rowing Championships in 2005. On five occasions from 2006 to 2011 Pratley rowed in the New South Wales senior women's eight contesting the Queen's Cup at the Australian Championships.

In Sydney University colours she contested Australian national titles at the Australian Rowing Championships on a number of occasions. In 2006 and 2007 she raced in all three sculling boats - the single, the double and the quad as well as being seated at six in New South Wales composite eights. She won the Australian national title in the quad scull in 2006. In 2008 she competed in the quad, in a pair and in a composite Australian selection eight which won the open women's eight national championship.

== International representative rowing ==
Pratley made her debut representative appearance for Australia in a single scull at the 2006 Rowing World Cup III in Lucerne. A month later with Elizabeth Kell she took a double scull to the 2006 World Rowing Championships at Eton Dorney. In exciting racing they fought off their fancied British rivals Georgina and Caroline Evers-Swindell (who had dominated the event from 2002 to 2005) to lead at the half-way point and hold on for an 0.8seconds victory over Germany. In an upset Kell and Pratley claimed their first and only senior world championship title.

For the 2007 World Rowing Championships Pratley was selected to race the Australian quad scull with Amy Ives, Catriona Sens and Sonia Mills. They placed fourth in Munich 2007. In the Olympic year of 2008 Pratley moved into contention for sweep-oared boats. She was picked for the Australian women's eight for the World Rowing Cup II of 2008 at Lucerne and then was in the two seat of the women's eight for Beijing 2008. They placed sixth.

In 2010 Pratley moved back into sculls. At the 2010 World Rowing Championships in Lake Karapiro she raced in the Australian quad scull with Sally Kehoe, Kerry Hore and Kim Crow to a fourth placing. Hore and Crow moved into a double scull in 2011 and Amy Clay and Sarah Cook were added to the quad. They raced at the World Rowing Cup III in Lucerne and then at the 2011 World Rowing Championships in Eton Dorney where they finished fourth. In the Olympic year 2012 Kerry Hore was moved back into the quad and Pratley was given the opportunity to race the Australian women's double scull with Australia's prominent sculler Kim Crow. They raced in the lead-up at the World Rowing Cup III in Munich and then at the 2012 London Olympics they won their heat and raced to a silver medal in the final beaten out by the British double of Anna Watkins and Katherine Grainger. It was Pratley's last Australian representative appearance.

== Post rowing ==
Pratley officially announced her retirement from competitive rowing immediately after winning a silver medal at the London Olympics 2012 on 6 August 2012. As of 2018 she practices as a sports physiotherapist in Queensland.
