= List of people from Northallerton =

This is a list of people from, or associated with Northallerton, a town in North Yorkshire, England. This list is arranged alphabetically by surname:

Table of contents:
A B C D E F G H I J K L M N O P Q R S T U V W X Y Z
Without biographies • See also • References

== A ==
- Kitty Anderson (1903–1979), a schoolteacher, she lived her last years and died in Northallerton.

== B ==
- Jessica Barden, actor born in Northallerton
- Dan Brown, golfer
- Thomas Burnet, born at Croft, educated at Northallerton
- Kate Butch, Drag Queen from RuPaul's Drag Race UK Series 5 was born in Northallerton.

== C ==
- Karl Carver, cricketer

== D ==
- Andy Dawson, footballer born in Northallerton, played for Nottingham Forest and Scunthorpe United
- Kevin Dawson, footballer born in Northallerton, played for Nottingham Forest and Barnet
- Michael Dawson, footballer who has played for Hull City, Nottingham Forest, and Tottenham Hotspur.
- Carla Devlin, olympic rower born in Northallerton
- Alfred Cardew Dixon, mathematician

== F ==
- John Fisher, vicar of Northallerton in the 1490s

== G ==
- Edmund Gheast (1514–1577), church of England bishop
- Alex Greaves (b. 1968) jockey

== H ==
- George Hickes, Dean of Worcester cathedral, born in Kirkby Wiske, educated in Northallerton
- Alan Richard Hill, Victoria Cross recipient
- Alan Hinkes, mountaineer, is the only person in the world to have conquered the world's 14 highest peaks
- Dan Hodgson, cricketer born in Northallerton

== J ==
- Joanne Jackson, swimmer

== K ==
- John Kettlewell (1653–1685), clergyman and theological writer

== L ==
- Henry Lascelles (1690–1753), MP and plantation owner
- Scott Lincoln, shot put champion

== R ==
- John Radcliffe (1652–1714), founder of Oxford's John Radcliffe Hospital and physician to William of Orange. Educated at Northallerton.
- Graham Rennison, footballer born in Northallerton
- Thomas Rymer, born at Appleton Wiske, educated in Northallerton

== S ==
- Bobby Scaife, footballer, born in Northallerton
- Marc Scott, runner
- Jodi Ewart Shadoff, golfer, born in Northallerton
- Dorothy E. Smith, ethnographer, born in Northallerton

== T ==
- Andy Toman, footballer born in Northallerton

== W ==
- Sidney Weighell (1923–2002), former general secretary of the NUR
- Laurence Whiteley, born in Scarborough, but lives in Northallerton
- Dave Wintersgill, footballer born in Northallerton
