= Jane Thornton =

Canadian sport medicine physician and rower (born 1978)

Personal information
- Nationality: Canada
- Born: Jane S. Thornton; 9 July 1978 (age 48) Fredericton, New Brunswick, Canada
- Height: 178 cm (5 ft 10 in)
- Weight: 68 kg (150 lb)

Sport
- Country: Canada
- Sport: Rowing
- University team: University of Western Ontario
- Club: Fredericton Rowing Club, Don Rowing Club of Mississauga, Western Rowing Club

Achievements and titles
- Olympic finals: 4th Beijing 2008 Eights (W8+)
Medal record
Women's rowing
Representing Canada
World Rowing Championships
Gold medal – first place	2006 Eton, UK	Coxless Pairs (W2-)
Commonwealth Rowing Championships
Gold medal – first place	2002 Nottingham, UK	Single Sculls (W1x)
Gold medal – first place	2002 Nottingham, UK	Quadruple sculls (W4x)
World University Rowing Championships
Gold medal – first place	2002 Nottingham, UK	Double Sculls (W2x)
Silver medal – second place	2002 Nottingham, UK	Single Sculls (W1x)

Jane S. Thornton (born 9 July 1978) is a Canadian sport medicine physician, associate professor, World Champion and Olympic rower, and international advocate for physical activity. She serves as the director of the Health, Medicine and Science Department for the International Olympic Committee. Thornton is also president of the Canadian Academy of Sport and Exercise Medicine and holds the Canada Research Chair in Injury Prevention and Physical Activity for Health at the University of Western Ontario. She was born in Fredericton, New Brunswick, Canada.

She was a member of Canada's National team for over a decade, winning a gold medal at the 2006 World Rowing Championships in the women's coxless pairs with Darcy Marquardt. Although Thornton and Marquardt qualified in that event for the Olympics at the 2007 World Rowing Championships, their teammates in the Canadian women's eights failed to quality. Thornton and Marquardt were then moved into the women's eights where, sitting in stroke pair, they earned that crew's Olympic berth in the final Olympic qualification event in June 2008, just two months before the Games.

Thornton earned a BSc, MSc and Ph.D. in kinesiology and sport medicine from the University of Western Ontario before attending medical school at the University of Toronto. She is a licensed sport and exercise medicine physician. In 2025, she was awarded an Honorary Professorship at the University of Edinburgh.

== International rowing ==
From 2001 to 2011, Thornton competed as a member of Canada's National Rowing Team.

One of her chief accomplishments during this time was an undefeated international season in the Women's Pair with partner Darcy Marquardt that culminated in victory at the 2006 World Rowing Championships at Eton-Dorney, UK. The duo qualified the Women's Pair for the Beijing 2008 Olympics at the 2007 World Rowing Championships.

In the spring of 2008, Thornton was assigned to stroke the Women's Eight at the final Olympic qualification regatta where the crew secured a berth for the Games. That crew including Ashley Brzozowicz, Darcy Marquardt, Buffy-Lynne Williams, Sarah Bonikowsky, Romina Stefancic, Andréanne Morin, Heather Mandoli and cox Lesley Thompson-Willie went on to come fourth in Beijing by the narrowest of margins (just 0.82 seconds separated 2nd place from 4th).

Other notable accomplishments representing Canada during this period include three Canadian National Championship titles in the Women's Pair, three World Cup podium performances in the Women's Pair and Eight, Commonwealth Rowing Championship wins in the Women's Single and Qruple Sculls and gold at the World University Rowing Championships in the Women's Single and Double Sculls.

In 2006 Thornton and Marquardt were Canadian Sports Awards finalist in the "Partners of the Year" category. In 2007, Canadian Living Magazine placed Thornton 7th on their ranking of "Canada's Top 10 Female Athletes", a list that included a who's who of Canadian women in elite sport: 1-Marie-France Dubreuil (Ice Dancing); 2-Blythe Hartley (Diving); 3-Hayley Wickenheiser (Ice Hockey); 4-Clara Hughes (Speed Skating); Sara Renner (Cross-Country Skiing); 6-Christine Sinclair (Soccer); 8-Kelly Scott (Curling); Jeane Lassen (Weightlifting); 10-Lorie-Kane (Golf).

Thornton was named Honorary Team Captain for Team New Brunswick at the 2009 Canada Summer Games. In 2010, she was further honoured as a torchbearer in the Olympic Torch Relay during the lead up to the Vancouver 2010 Winter Olympics.

Thornton is a member of both the Fredericton Sports Wall of Fame and the New Brunswick Sports Hall of Fame.

Rowing Canada has recognised Thornton with three separate awards: the Rowing Canada Aviron Award of Merit (the highest award conferred by Rowing Canada) "in recognition of exceptional service to rowing as a competitive athlete"; the Rowing Canada Aviron Centennial Medal for outstanding contribution to Canadian rowing; and the Rowing Canada Aviron International Achievement Award.

== Social responsibility ==
In 2015, Thornton was awarded the AthletesCAN Athlete Social Responsibility Award for her efforts to provide mentorship, inspiration and leadership to developing athletes within Canada's rowing community as well as her contributions to push forward the promotion and recognition of athlete social responsibility internationally.

Thornton has additionally been involved as an Athlete Ambassador at Right to Play Canada, in which capacity she travelled to Uganda in 2009.

== International experience ==
During the course of her education and athletic pursuits, Thornton sought out many international experiences to complement her research, including further medical training in six different countries.

She has developed educational resources and medical curricula in Switzerland, Luxembourg, the United Kingdom, and Canada and lectures on the topic internationally.

== Selected publications ==
Thornton has contributed to a number of publications in leading medical journals including the following:

1. Thornton, Jane S; Frémont, Pierre; Khan, Karim; Poirier, Paul; Fowles, Jonathon; Wells, Greg D; Frankovich, Renata J (2016). "Physical activity prescription: a critical opportunity to address a modifiable risk factor for the prevention and management of chronic disease: a position statement by the Canadian Academy of Sport and Exercise Medicine: Table 1" (PDF). British Journal of Sports Medicine. 50 (18): 1109–1114. doi:10.1136/bjsports-2016-096291. ISSN 0306-3674. PMID 27335208.
2. Thornton, Jane S.; Vinther, Anders; Wilson, Fiona; Lebrun, Constance M.; Wilkinson, Mike; Di Ciacca, Stephen R.; Orlando, Karen; Smoljanovic, Tomislav (2016). "Rowing Injuries: An Updated Review". Sports Medicine. 47 (4): 641–661. doi:10.1007/s40279-016-0613-y. ISSN 0112-1642. PMID 27577685. S2CID 6595422.
3. Gates, Ann B; Kerry, Roger; Moffatt, Fiona; Ritchie, Ian K; Meakins, Adam; Thornton, Jane S; Rosenbaum, Simon; Taylor, Alan (2017). "Movement for movement: exercise as everybody's business?". British Journal of Sports Medicine. 51 (10): 767–768. doi:10.1136/bjsports-2016-096857. ISSN 0306-3674. PMID 27797742. S2CID 206882372.
