= Elizabeth Kell =

Australian rower (born 1983)

Personal information
- Born: 9 July 1983 (age 42) Sydney

Sport
- Sport: Rowing
- Club: Sydney Uni Women's BC; Mosman Rowing Club

Achievements and titles
- Olympic finals: Beijing 2008 W8+
Medal record
Women's rowing
Representing Australia
World Rowing Championships
Gold medal – first place	2006 Eton	W2X
U23 World Championships
Gold medal – first place	U23 2003 Belgrade	W2X
Silver medal – second place	U23 2002 Genoa	W2X

Elizabeth Kell (born 9 July 1983) is an Australian former rower, a national champion, world champion and an Olympian.

== Club and state rowing ==
Kell was educated at MLC School in Burwood, Sydney where she took up rowing. Her senior club rowing was from the Sydney University Women's Boat Club and the Mosman Rowing Club.

Kell made state selection in successive New South Wales crews contesting the 2001, 2002 and 2003 women's youth eight championship racing for the Bicentennial Cup at the Interstate Regatta within the Australian Rowing Championships. Those crews were victorious in 2001 and 2002. In 2006, 2007 and 2008 Kell rowed in the New South Wales senior women's eight contesting the Queen's Cup at the Australian Championships. She also contesting the Women's Interstate Sculling Championship (the Nell Slatter Trophy) in 2006.

In Sydney University colours she contested Australian national titles at the Australian Rowing Championships on a number of occasions. In 2006 and 2007 she raced in all three sculling boats - the single, the double and the quad as well as being seated at seven in New South Wales composite eights. In 2008 she competed in the quad, in a pair and in a composite Australian selection eight which won the open women's eight national championship.

== International representative rowing ==
Kell was still aged sixteen when she was selected to stroke the Australian junior quad scull contesting the 2000 Junior World Rowing Championships in Zagreb, Croatia. They finished in overall twelfth place. The following year Kell was again selected to race at the Junior World Championships, this time at Duisburg, Germany in a double scull with Hally Hames. They won their repechage and comfortably qualified for the semifinal in the third fastest time. It was the Italians who surprised the Australians in the final in a good performance leaving the Australians out of the medals by 0.6 second. The Russians and Germans created a margin over the rest of the field leaving Kell and Hames battling for the bronze. They were in third place through most of the race but could not match the sprint of the Italians to the finish.

In 2002 Kell was selected in a development quad who raced at the World Rowing Cup II in Lucerne before then proceeding to the 2002 World Rowing U23 Championships in Genoa. The quad finished in overall second place, winning a silver medal and helping the Australian women's squad to successfully defend the overall women's trophy points tally at this regatta. In 2003 Kell rowed at her fourth underage World Championships the World Rowing U23 Championships in Belgrade. She contested the women's double scull with Sarah Outhwaite and brought home her first world championship medal. One month later Kell made her Australian senior selection debut racing in the double scull at the 2003 World Rowing Championships in Milan with Catriona Sens to a sixth placing.

In 2006 Kell and Brooke Pratley took a double scull to the World Championships at Eton Dorney. In exciting racing they fought off their fancied British rivals Georgina and Caroline Evers-Swindell (who had dominated the event from 2002 to 2005) to lead at the half-way point and hold on for an 0.8seconds victory over Germany. In an upset Kell and Pratley claimed their first and only senior world championship title.

2007 saw Kell forced out of Australian selection due to back pain from the long term effects of training. She undertook an operation and made a comeback late in 2007 in a campaign for the 2008 Olympics. She trained and rehabilitated at the Australian Institute of Sport She was called back into national selection contention in the Olympic lead-up and rowed in the five seat of the Australian women's eight at two World Rowing Cups in Europe. At Beijing 2008 she was again in the five seat of the women's eight. They placed sixth in Kell's last Australian representative appearance.
