= Sarah Heard =

Australian rower (born 1983)

Personal information
- Born: 4 October 1983 (age 42)

Sport
- Sport: Rowing
- Club: Melbourne Uni Boat Club
Medal record
Women's rowing
Representing Australia
World Rowing Championships
Gold medal – first place	2005 Gifu, Japan	W8+
Silver medal – second place	2010 Lake Karapiro	W4-
Bronze medal – third place	2006 Eton, England	W8+

Sarah Heard (born 4 October 1983) is a former Australian representative rower. She was a twelve-time Australian national and 2005 world champion. She stroked the Australian senior women's eight at the premier world regattas every year from 2005 to 2008 and including the women's eight final at the 2008 Summer Olympics.

== Club and state rowing ==
Born in Melbourne, Heard's senior rowing was done from the Melbourne University Rowing Club.

Heard's first state representative selection came in 2002 to the Victorian youth eight contesting the Bicentennial Cup at the Interstate Regatta within the Australian Rowing Championships. She rowed in the youth eight again in 2003. Heard was selected in Victorian senior women's eights to contest the Queen's Cup at the Australian Championships on six consecutive occasions from 2004 to 2009. Those crews were victorious each year from 2005 to 2009.

In Melbourne University colours she contested all three sweep-oared women's heavyweight national Australian titles at the Australian Rowing Championships in 2005, 2006, 2007, 2008 and two of those events in 2009. She won the coxless four national title in 2005, 2007, 2008 and 2009; the coxless pair title with Emily Martin in 2006; and won the national title in the women's eight in a composite Australian selection crew in 2007 and in a composite Victorian eight in 2009.

== International representative rowing ==
Heard first represented for Australia contesting the 2004 World Rowing U23 Championships in Poznan, Poland in a coxless pair. She placed fifth.

In 2005, aged 22 Heard was elevated to the Australian senior women's squad. That year she'd stroked the Victorian eight to a dominant 10sec victory in the domestic Queen's Cup. She came into contention to lead the Australian eight and at the World Rowing Cups I and II she stroked the crew to a fourth and then a first place. Two months later at the 2005 World Rowing Championships in Gizu, Japan – her first appearance for Australia at a senior World Championship – Heard led the women's eight to a gold medal and a world championship title.

In 2006 Heard held her place in the eight but with the crew slipping from 3rd place to 4th place in the two Rowing World Cups (at Munich and Poznan), coach Darren Balmforth made seating changes. In small boats at Poznan the pair of Heard and Emily Martin had beaten out the other Australian pairs containing members of the eight including a pair of Kate Hornsey and Amber Bradley. However, for the 2006 World Championships Balmforth seated Heard at six and Hornsey at stroke. The eight won the bronze medal.

For 2007 Heard was again in the eight at both Rowing World Cups and for the World Championships. She stroked the eight to a fourth place at the World Cup II and won gold at that regatta stroking the coxless four. At the 2007 World Championships in Munich she stroked the eight to a fourth placing.

Prospects looked good for the Australian women's eight in the 2008 Olympic year. They won at the World Rowing Cup I in Munich and finished second at World Rowing Cup II in Lucerne with Heard setting the pace in both campaigns. However at Beijing in 2008 in spite of expectations the crew stroked by Heard, finished sixth overall.

Heard's final Australian representative appearance was at the 2010 World Rowing Championships in Lake Karapiro, New Zealand. In the bow seat of the coxless four with Pauline Frasca, Sarah Cook and Kate Hornsey, Heard brought home her third World Championship medal – this time a silver.
