= Natalie Bale =

Australian rower (born 1986)

Personal information
- Born: 7 April 1986 (age 40)

Sport
- Country: Australia
- Sport: Rowing
- Event(s): Coxless Pair (W2-); Eight (W8+)
- Club: Swan River Rowing Club

Achievements and titles
- Olympic finals: Beijing 2008 W8+
Medal record
Women's rowing
Representing Australia
World Championships
Silver medal – second place	2005 Gifu, Japan	W2-
World Rowing U23 Championships
Gold medal – first place	2004 Banyoles, Spain	W2-
Junior World Rowing Championships
Silver medal – second place	2003 Athens, Greece	W2-

Natalie Bale (born 7 April 1986) is a West Australian former rower. She was an U23 world champion, a medallist at senior world championships and was a 2008 Olympian.

== Club and state rowing ==
Bale's senior club rowing was from the Swan River Rowing Club in Perth, Western Australia.

Bale first represented for her state of Western Australia stroking the 2003 youth eight to victory in the Bicentennial Cup at the Interstate Regatta within the Australian Rowing Championships. In 2004 she was selected in the West Australian senior women's eight to compete for the Queen's Cup at the Interstate Regatta. She raced in successive West Australian Queen's Cup eights from 2004 to 2008 and stroked the 2005 eight.

== International representative rowing ==
Bale made her Australian representative debut in a coxless pair at the 2003 Junior World Rowing Championships in Athens when she rowed to a silver medal with Annika Naughton. In 2004 again racing with Naughton in a coxless pair, she rowed to a gold medal at the 2004 World Rowing U23 Championships in Banyoles, Spain.

In 2005 Bale was elevated to the Australian senior women's squad. She competed at the World Rowing Cup I in both a coxless pair and the eight and then at the 2005 World Rowing Championships in Gifu, Japan in the coxless pair with Sarah Tait where they won a silver medal. In 2007 she competed at the World Rowing Cup I in the coxless pair, at the WRC II in the coxless four and the eight and then at the 2007 World Rowing Championships in Munich in the women's eight who finished in fourth place.

In the 2008 Olympic lead-up she rowed in the two or four seat of the Australian women's eight at two World Rowing Cups in Europe. At Beijing 2008 she was again in the four seat of the women's eight. They placed sixth in Bale's last Australian representative appearance.
