= Marlies Smulders =

Dutch rower (born 1982)

Personal information
- Born: 22 February 1982 (age 44)
Medal record
Women's rowing
Representing the Netherlands
Olympic Games
Silver medal – second place	2008 Beijing	Women's eight
Bronze medal – third place	2004 Athens	Women's eight

Marlies Smulders (born 22 February 1982 in Amstelveen) is a rower from the Netherlands.

With the Dutch eights Smulders qualified for the 2004 Summer Olympics in Athens and she and her teammates rowed to the bronze medal. In 2007, she returned to the eights in which the Dutch only became seventh at the World Championships. Earlier that year they won the Rowing World Cup in Amsterdam and they finished third in both Luzern and Linz.

She qualified for the 2008 Summer Olympics in Beijing with the Dutch eights forming a team with Femke Dekker, Annemiek de Haan, Roline Repelaer van Driel, Nienke Kingma, Sarah Siegelaar, Annemarieke van Rumpt, Helen Tanger and cox Ester Workel.
