= Femke Dekker =

Dutch rower (born 1979)

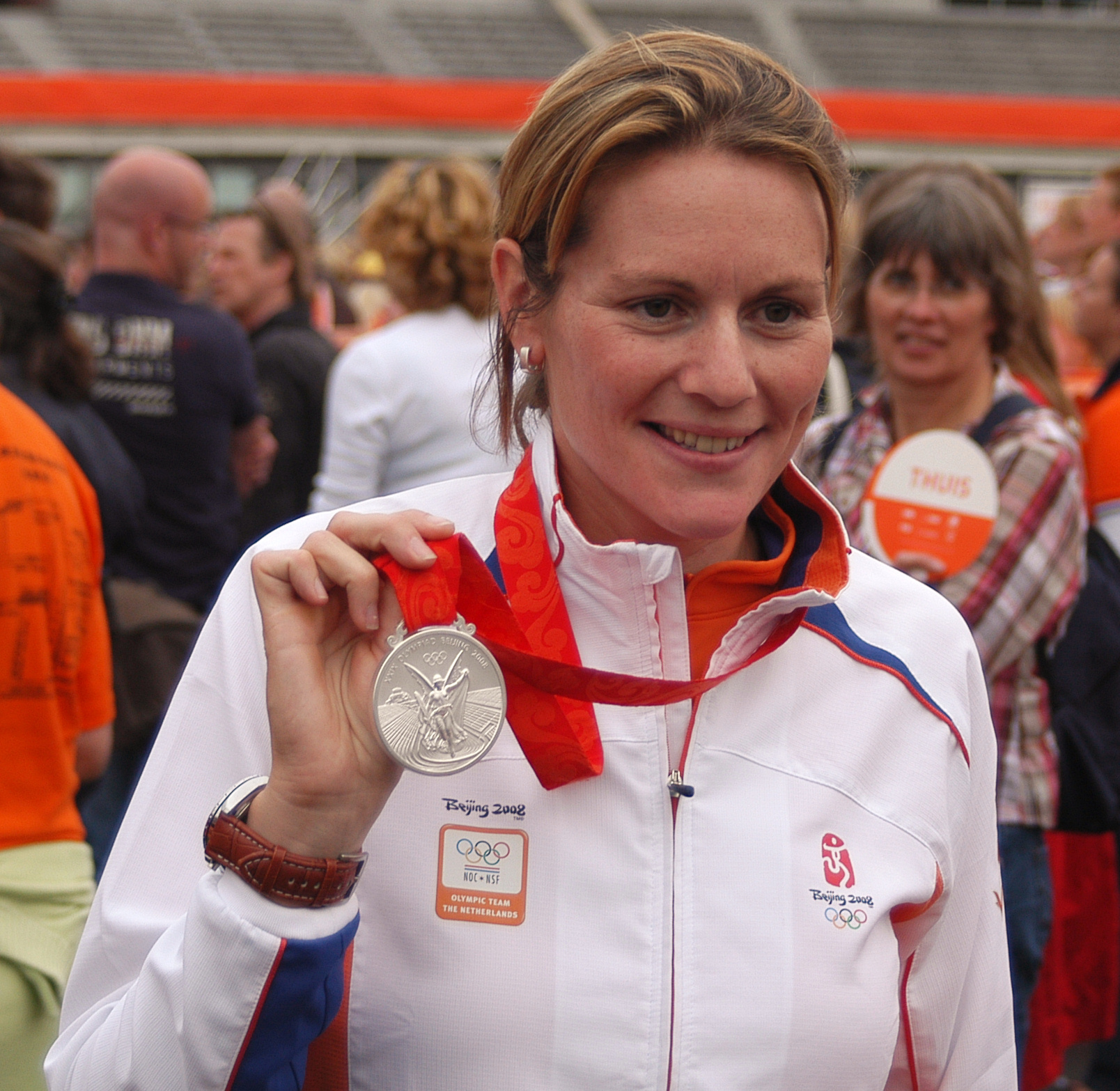
- Dekker in 2008

Personal information
- Born: 11 July 1979 (age 46) Leiderdorp, South Holland, Netherlands
Medal record
Women's rowing
Representing the Netherlands
Olympic Games
Silver medal – second place	2008 Beijing	Eight
World Championships
Gold medal – first place	2009 Poznań	Coxless four
Gold medal – first place	2010 Karapiro	Coxless four
Bronze medal – third place	2001 Lucerne	Coxless four
Bronze medal – third place	2005 Gifu	Women's eight
Bronze medal – third place	2009 Poznań	Women's eight
Bronze medal – third place	2011 Bled	Coxless four
European Championships
Silver medal – second place	2010 Montemor	Women's eight

Femke Dekker (pronounced [ˈfɛmkə ˈdɛkər]; born 11 July 1979) is a Dutch rower from the Netherlands.

Dekker started rowing in 1990 and made her international debut in the double sculls at the 1995 Junior World Championships in Poznań. Together with Christel Rijnten she won the bronze medal. The following year Dekker became World Junior Champion in the four with Rijnten, Karin Klinge and Maartje Breeman in Glasgow. In 1997 she finished fifth in the single scull race at the Junior World Championships in Hazewinkel. She kept on rowing the single scull in 1998 with winning a bronze medal in the Nations Cup. In 1999 in the double sculls with Annemieke Klaren she was unsuccessful.

Dekker and Marloes Bolman qualified for the 2000 Summer Olympics in Sydney and became 10th in the coxless pairs. In 2001, she formed a fours boat with Anneke Venema, Hurnet Dekkers and Carin ter Beek that finished fourth and fifth at the Rowing World Cup meetings in Sevilla and Munich. At the World Championships in Luzern with Christine Vink as a replacement of Hurnet Dekkers they won the bronze medal in the coxless fours. 2002 was a disappointing year for Dekker as she only reached two fourth places in World Cup meetings with Marlies Smulders, Nienke Hommes and Melina Bus in the fours. At the World Championships they could only reach to an eighth position. The double sculls season in 2003 with Froukje Wegman was even more disappointing as not one single A-final was reached. She decided to row on her own in 2004 and to aim to qualify for the 2004 Summer Olympics. In the single scull she became fifth and third in World Cup meetings, which secured her spot in Athens, but at the Olympics itself she only was able to finish in tenth position.

In 2005 it was time to start with the newly born Dutch eights project. The team existing of Dekker, Sanne Beukers, Nienke Hommes, Hurnet Dekkers, Annemarieke van Rumpt, Laura Posthuma, Annemiek de Haan, Helen Tanger and cox Ester Workel managed to row to the second spot at the World Cup meeting in Munich straight away. With Marlies Smulders instead of Hommes they reached the same spot in Luzern. Hommes returned to the team instead of Smulders for the World Championships, while Beukers was replaced by Nienke Dekkers. This team dropped down one place and won the bronze medal. In 2006 Dekker remained in the eights, but at the World Championships in Eton she performed in the coxless fours with Posthuma, Nienke Kingma and Roline Repelaer van Driel to finish in fifth.

She returned to the eights in 2007 rowing to two third positions in the World Cup in Linz and Luzern as well as the first place in Amsterdam with Jacobine Veenhoven, Smulders, Hurnet Dekkers, Van Rumpt, Repelaer van Driel, Sarah Siegelaar, De Haan and Workel. Then at the World Championships in Munich the team failed to achieve the A-final and had to be satisfied with the 7th position overall. In 2008 the team tried to qualify for the 2008 Summer Olympics and at the first World Cup in Munich Veenhoven was replaced by Nienke Dekkers while Hurnet Dekkers was replaced by Nienke Kingma; they finished in fourth position. Helen Tanger replaced Nienke Dekkers in the second meeting held in Luzern and another fourth position was achieved. This also meant the Olympic qualification was accomplished.
