= Christina Hennings =

German rower (born 1984)

Medal record

Representing Germany

Women's rowing

World Rowing Championships
Silver medal – second place	2006 Eton	W8+

Christina Hennings (née Gerking, born 21 January 1984 in Leer) is a German rower. She won silver at the 2006 World Rowing Championships in Eton, Berkshire. She competed at the 2008 Summer Olympics with the women's eight; the team came seventh.

On 25 March 2008, she married Kai Hennings at Hanover and has since been known as Christina Hennings.
