= Natasha Howard (rower) =

British rower

Medal record

Women's rowing

Representing Great Britain

World Rowing Championships
Bronze medal – third place	2007 Munich	W8+

Natasha Howard (born 3 September 1980 in Harare) is a British rower. She rowed in the women's eight at the 2008 Summer Olympics but could not row in the finals due to illness. She is a graduate of the University of East Anglia and also studied at the University of British Columbia.
