= Lindsey Maguire =

British rower

Personal information
- Born: 15 January 1982 (age 44) Edinburgh, Scotland
- Relatives: Moira Walls (mother)

Sport
- Sport: Rowing
- Club: Wallingford Rowing Club
Medal record
Women's rowing
Representing Great Britain
World Championships
Bronze medal – third place	2011 Bled	W8+
European Championships
Silver medal – second place	2008 Marathon	W8+
Bronze medal – third place	2007 Poznań	W8+

Lindsey Maguire (born 15 January 1982) is a British rower who competed at the 2012 Summer Olympics.

== Personal life ==
Maguire was born in Edinburgh, Scotland. Her mother is former long jumper, Moira Walls. Maguire studied maths and psychology at the University of Birmingham. She then completed a master's degree in developmental psychopathology at Durham University (Ustinov College) in 2004.

== Rowing career ==
She was part of the British squad that topped the medal table at the 2011 World Rowing Championships in Bled, where she won a bronze medal as part of the eight with Alison Knowles, Jo Cook, Jessica Eddie, Louisa Reeve, Natasha Page, Katie Greves, Victoria Thornley and Caroline O'Connor.

She finished fifth in the women's eight at the 2012 Olympic Games.
