= Alison Knowles (rower) =

British rower (born 1982)

Personal information
- Full name: Alison Margaret Knowles
- Nationality: British
- Born: 27 March 1982 (age 44) Bournemouth
Medal record
Women's rowing
Representing Great Britain
World Rowing Championships
Bronze medal – third place	2007 Munich	W8+
Bronze medal – third place	2011 Lake Bled	W8+

Alison Margaret Knowles (born 27 March 1982 in Bournemouth) is a British rower who competed at the 2008 Summer Olympics.

== Rowing career ==
Knowles competed in the women's eight at the 2008 Olympic Games but could not row in the final due to illness.

She was part of the British squad that topped the medal table at the 2011 World Rowing Championships in Bled, where she won a bronze medal as part of the eight with Jo Cook, Jessica Eddie, Louisa Reeve, Natasha Page, Lindsey Maguire, Katie Greves, Victoria Thornley and Caroline O'Connor.
