= Natasha Page =

British rower

Personal information
- Full name: Natasha Nicole Page
- Nationality: British
- Born: 30 April 1985 (age 41) Gloucester

Sport
- Club: Reading University
Medal record
Women's rowing
Representing United Kingdom
World Championships
Bronze medal – third place	2011 Lake Bled	W8+

Natasha Nicole Page (born 30 April 1985 in Gloucester) is a British rower who competed at the 2008 Summer Olympics and the 2012 Summer Olympics.

== Rowing career ==
She finished fifth in the women's eight at the 2008 Olympic Games.

She was part of the British squad that topped the medal table at the 2011 World Rowing Championships in Bled, where she won a bronze medal as part of the eight with Alison Knowles, Jo Cook, Jessica Eddie, Louisa Reeve, Lindsey Maguire, Katie Greves, Victoria Thornley and Caroline O'Connor.

She finished fifth in the women's eight at the 2012 Olympic Games.

== Personal life ==
She is married to fellow Great Britain rower Sam Townsend.
