= Annemarieke van Rumpt =

Dutch rower (born 1980)

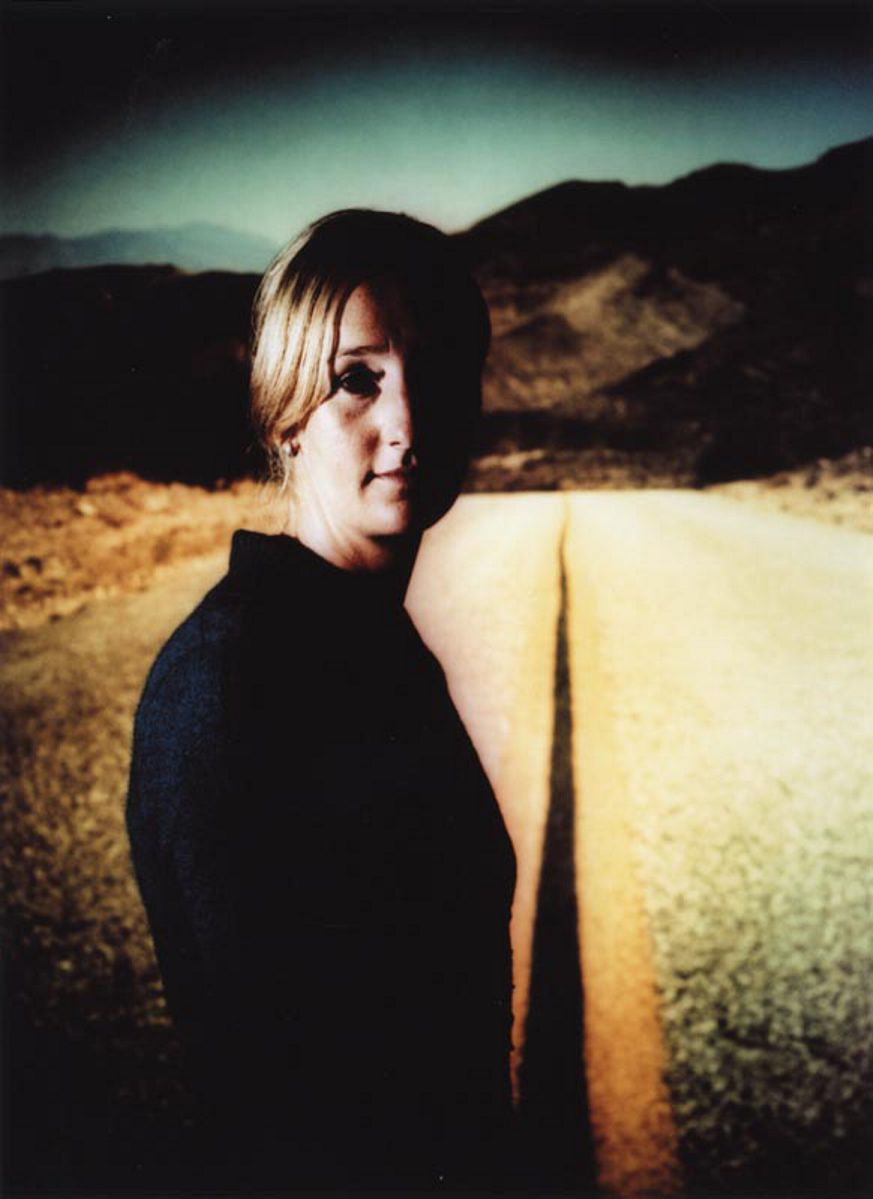
- Van Rumpt in 2006

Personal information
- Born: 29 April 1980 (age 46) Middelharnis, Netherlands
Medal record
Women's rowing
Representing the Netherlands
Olympic Games
Silver medal – second place	2008 Beijing	Women's eight
Bronze medal – third place	2004 Athens	Women's eight

Annemarieke van Rumpt (born 29 April 1980 in Middelharnis) is a rower from the Netherlands.

Van Rumpt took part in the World Championships of 2003 in Milan winning the silver medal in the four. With the Dutch eights she qualified for the 2004 Summer Olympics in Athens and she and her teammates rowed to the bronze medal. They won another bronze medal at the 2005 World Championships in Gifu. A short trip to the double sculls in 2005 left her at the fifth position at the 2006 World Championships in Eton. In 2007, she returned to the eights in which the Dutch only became seventh at the World Championships. Earlier that year they won the Rowing World Cup in Amsterdam and they finished third in both Luzern and Linz.

She qualified for the 2008 Summer Olympics in Beijing with the Dutch eights forming a team with Femke Dekker, Annemiek de Haan, Roline Repelaer van Driel, Nienke Kingma, Sarah Siegelaar, Marlies Smulders, Helen Tanger and cox Ester Workel.
