= Helen Tanger =

Dutch rower (born 1978)

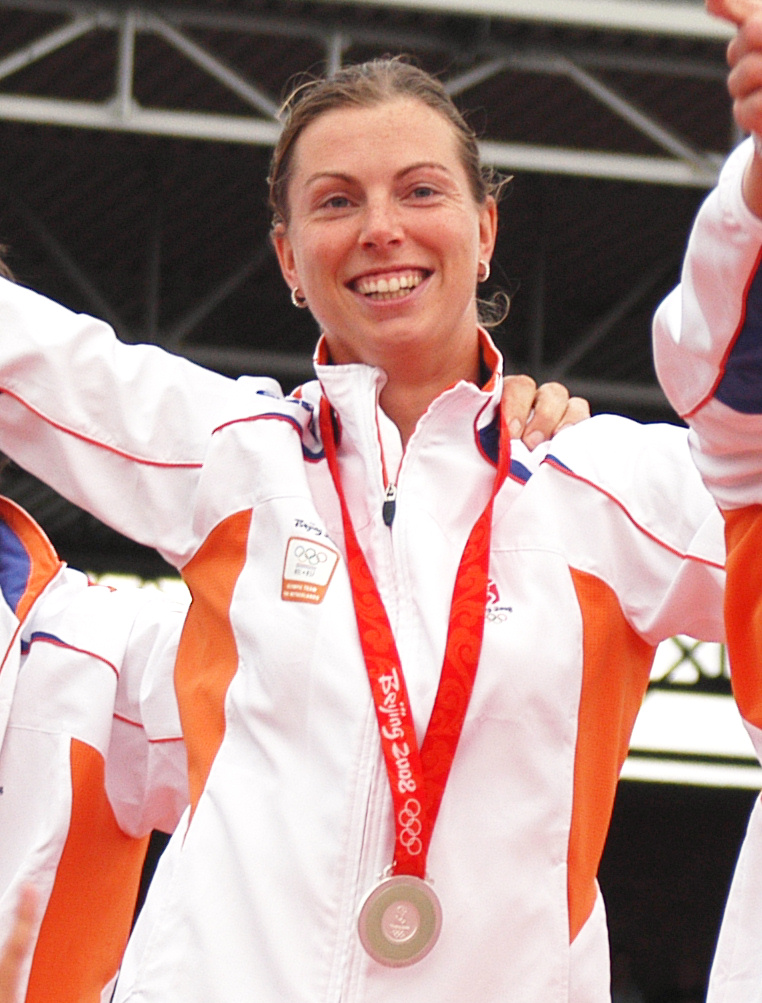

Personal information
- Nationality: Dutch
- Born: 22 August 1978 (age 48) Hardenberg, Netherlands

Sport
- Country: Netherlands
- Sport: Women's Rowing
- College team: Syracuse Orange (2001)
Medal record
Women's rowing
Representing the Netherlands
Olympic Games
Silver medal – second place	2008 Beijing	Women's eight
Bronze medal – third place	2004 Athens	Women's eight
World Championships
Bronze medal – third place	2005 Gifu	Women's eight

Helen Tanger (born 22 August 1978 in Hardenberg) is a rower from the Netherlands.

== Early life and education ==
Tanger is a graduate of Syracuse University in New York, earning her degree in 2001.

== Athletic career ==
Tanger took part in the World Championships of 2003 in Milan winning the silver medal in the four. With the Dutch eights she qualified for the 2004 Summer Olympics in Athens and she and her teammates rowed to the bronze medal. They won another bronze medal at the 2005 World Championships in Gifu. A short trip to the double sculls in 2005 left her at the fifth position at the 2006 World Championships in Eton.

In 2008, she returned to the eights and she qualified for the 2008 Summer Olympics in Beijing forming a team with Femke Dekker, Annemiek de Haan, Roline Repelaer van Driel, Nienke Kingma, Sarah Siegelaar, Marlies Smulders, Annemarieke van Rumpt and cox Ester Workel.
