= Nienke Kingma =

Dutch rower (born 1982)

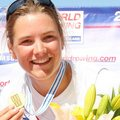

Medal record

Women's rowing

Representing the Netherlands

Olympic Games
Silver medal – second place	2008 Beijing	Eight
Bronze medal – third place	2012 London	Eight

Nienke Kingma (pronounced [ˈniŋkə ˈkɪŋmaː]; born 12 February 1982 in Driebergen) is a rower from the Netherlands.

Kingma took part in the World Championships of 2006 in the fours finishing fifth in Eton. A year later at the World Championships in Munich she was part of the double sculls and became 9th.

She qualified for the 2008 Summer Olympics in Beijing with the Dutch eights forming a team with Femke Dekker, Annemiek de Haan, Roline Repelaer van Driel, Annemarieke van Rumpt, Sarah Siegelaar, Marlies Smulders, Helen Tanger and cox Ester Workel. This team went on to win the silver medal at the 2008 Summer Olympics, finishing just under two seconds behind the winning US team.

At the 2012 Summer Olympics she competed for the Dutch team with Chantal Achterberg, Sytske de Groot, Roline Repelaer van Driel, Claudia Belderbos, Carline Bouw, Jacobine Veenhoven and cox Anne Schellekens. The team won the bronze medal.
