= Roline Repelaer van Driel =

Dutch rower (born 1984)

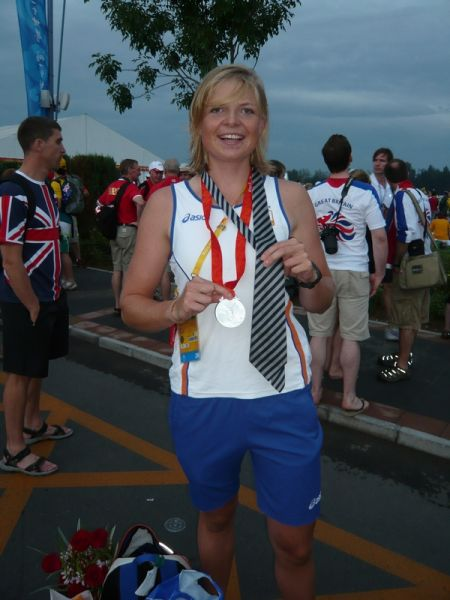

Personal information
- Born: 28 July 1984 (age 41) Amsterdam

Sport
- Sport: Rowing
Medal record
Women's rowing
Representing the Netherlands
Olympic Games
Silver medal – second place	2008 Beijing	Eight
Bronze medal – third place	2012 London	Eight
European Rowing Championships
Silver medal – second place	2010 Montemor-o-Velho	Eight

Roline Repelaer van Driel (born 28 July 1984 in Amsterdam) is a rower from the Netherlands. She started rowing as a student, at U.S.R. "Triton" rowing club in Utrecht.

Repelaer van Driel took part in the World Championships of 2006 in the fours finishing fifth in Eton. A year later at the World Championships in Munich she was part of the eights and became 7th. That same year they won the World Rowing Cup event in Amsterdam and became third in both Lucerne and Linz.

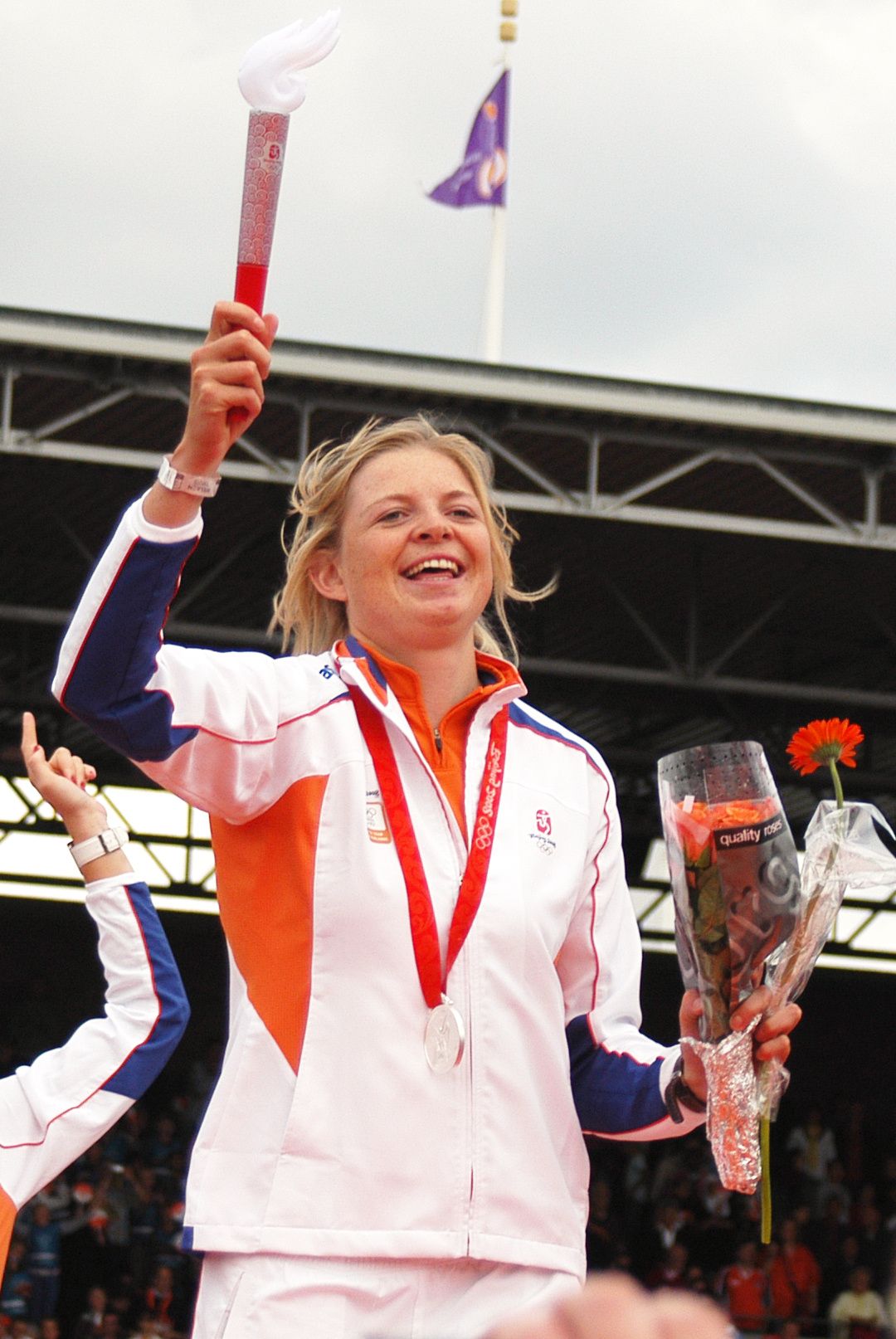

She qualified for the 2008 Summer Olympics in Beijing with the Dutch eights forming a team with Femke Dekker, Annemiek de Haan, Nienke Kingma, Annemarieke van Rumpt, Sarah Siegelaar, Marlies Smulders, Helen Tanger and cox Ester Workel, and the team won the silver medal. At the 2012 Summer Olympics the Dutch women's eight team that van Driel was part of won the bronze medal.
