= Kate Johnson (rower) =

American rower (born 1978)

Personal information
- Born: Katherine Johnson; December 18, 1978 (age 47) Denver, Colorado, U.S.
Medal record
Women's rowing
Representing the United States
Olympic Games
Silver medal – second place	2004 Athens	Women's eight
World Championships
Gold medal – first place	2002 Seville	Women's eight
World Rowing Cup
Gold medal – first place	2003 Milan	Women's eight
Gold medal – first place	2004 Lucerne	Women's eight
Gold medal – first place	2004 Munich	Women's eight

Katherine Johnson (born December 18, 1978) is an American rower who won a silver medal at the Athens 2004 Olympic Games in the women's eight. Johnson and her team won gold at the World Rowing Cups in Munich and Lucerne in 2004 prior to competing at the Olympic games. At the FISA World Rowing Championships in 2002, Johnson won the gold medal and World Championship title in the women's eight.

Johnson competed on nine U.S. National Rowing Teams during her career making her first international team at age 15. She also competed for the University of Michigan, from which she graduated in 2001. She was a three-time All-America honoree while at Michigan (1999–2001), and Big Ten Rower of the Year in both 2000 and 2001. She was inducted into the University of Michigan Hall of Honor in 2016.

== See also ==
- Caryn Davies
- Mary Whipple
- Anna Mickelson
- Laurel Korholz
