= Ester Workel =

Dutch rower (born 1975)

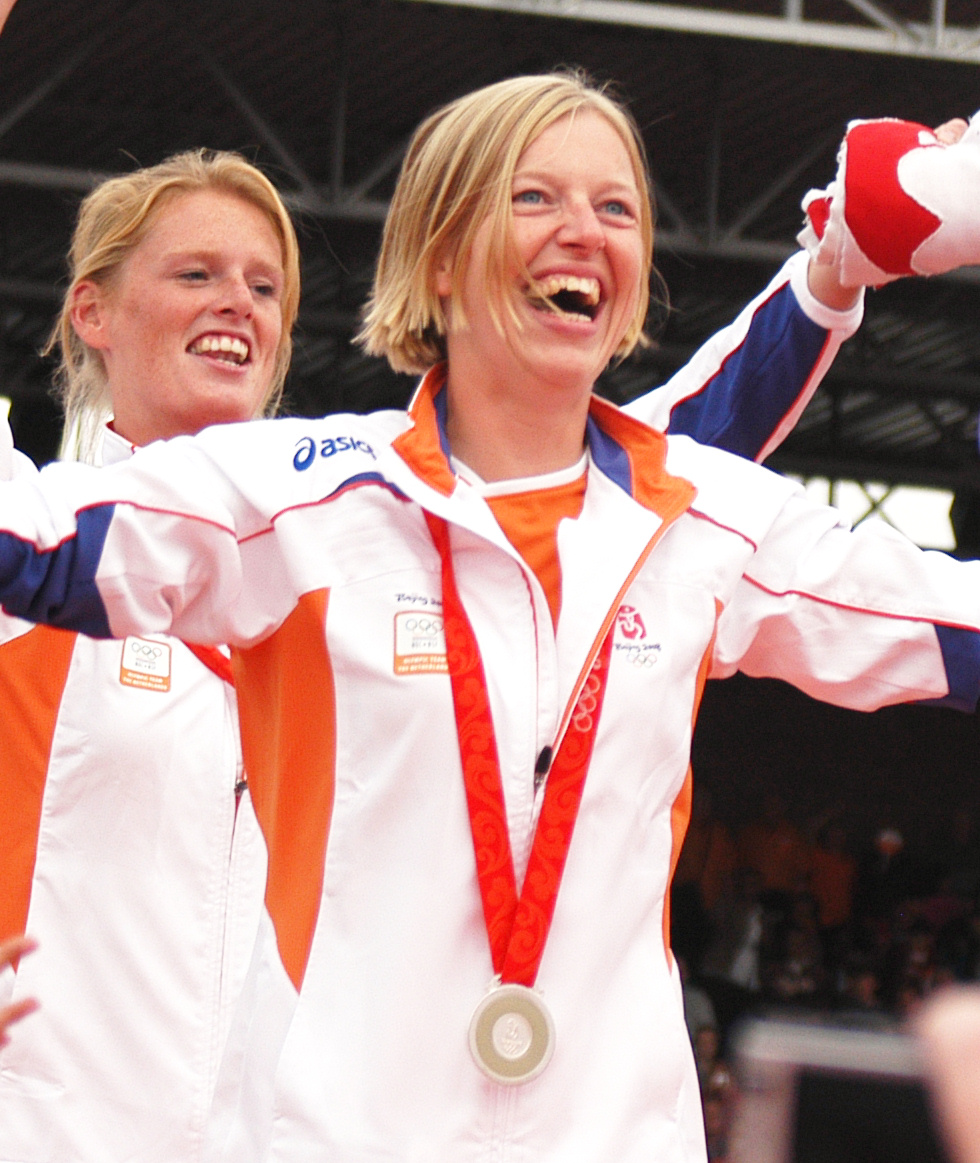

Medal record

Women's rowing

Representing the Netherlands

Olympic Games
Silver medal – second place	2008 Beijing	Women's eight
Bronze medal – third place	2004 Athens	Women's eight

World Championships
Bronze medal – third place	2005 Gifu	Women's eight

Ester Workel (born 18 March 1975 in Enschede) is a rowing cox from the Netherlands.

With the Dutch eights she qualified for the 2004 Summer Olympics in Athens and she led her teammates rowing to the bronze medal. They won another bronze medal at the 2005 World Championships in Gifu. In 2007, she returned to the eights in which the Dutch only became seventh at the World Championships. Earlier that year they won the Rowing World Cup in Amsterdam and they finished third in both Luzern and Linz.

She qualified for the 2008 Summer Olympics in Beijing with the Dutch eights forming a team with Femke Dekker, Annemiek de Haan, Roline Repelaer van Driel, Nienke Kingma, Sarah Siegelaar, Marlies Smulders, Helen Tanger and Annemarieke van Rumpt.
