= Simona Mușat =

Romanian rower

Personal information
- Born: Simona Dumitrita Strimbeschi; 16 September 1981 (age 44) Botoșani

Sport
- Sport: Rowing
Medal record
Women's rowing
Representing Romania
Olympic Games
Bronze medal – third place	2008 Beijing	Eight
European Championships
Gold medal – first place	2007 Poznań	Eight

Simona Dumitrita Muşat (née Strimbeschi, born 16 September 1981) is a Romanian rower. She competed at the 2008 Summer Olympics, where she won a bronze medal in women's eight.
