= Jo Cook =

British rower

Personal information
- Born: 22 March 1984 (age 42)

Sport
- Country: Great Britain
- Club: Leander Club
Medal record
Women's rowing
Representing Great Britain
World Championships
Bronze medal – third place	2011 Bled	eight

Jo Cook (born 22 March 1984) is a former British rower.

== Rowing career ==
Cook began rowing in 1996 at Lady Eleanor Holles School. In the 2000s, she competed at the 2004 and 2005 World Rowing U23 Championships. She made her senior debut in 2009.

She was part of the British squad that topped the medal table at the 2011 World Rowing Championships in Bled, where she won a bronze medal as part of the eight with Alison Knowles, Jessica Eddie, Louisa Reeve, Natasha Page, Lindsey Maguire, Katie Greves, Victoria Thornley and Caroline O'Connor.

Cook was reserve for the 2012 London Olympics.
