= Victoria Thornley =

Welsh rower

Vicky Thornley
Personal information
- Full name: Victoria Thornley
- Nationality: British
- Born: 30 November 1987 (age 38) St Asaph, Denbighshire, Wales
- Home town: Wrexham, Wales
- Years active: 2007–
- Height: 193 cm (6 ft 4 in)
- Weight: 76 kg (168 lb)
- Spouse: Richard Egington (m. 2020)

Sport
- Country: Great Britain
- Sport: Rowing
- Event: Double sculls
- Club: Leander Club
- Turned pro: 2009
Medal record
Women's rowing
Representing Great Britain
Olympic Games
Silver medal – second place	2016 Rio de Janeiro	Double sculls
World Championships
Bronze medal – third place	2011 Bled	Eight
Silver medal – second place	2017 Sarasota	Single sculls
European Championships
Bronze medal – third place	2015 Poznań	Double sculls
Gold medal – first place	2017 Račice	Single sculls
Silver medal – second place	2021 Varese	Single sculls

Victoria Thornley (born 30 November 1987) is a British rower. She won a silver medal for Great Britain with Katherine Grainger in the women's double sculls at the 2016 Summer Olympics. She was also a member of the Great Britain team that finished fifth in the women's eight at the 2012 Summer Olympics, and finished fourth in the single sculls at the 2020 Summer Olympics.

== Early life and education ==
Thornley was born in St Asaph to Andrew and Gina Thornley, and was brought up in Wrexham. She has two sisters. After completing her secondary education at Bishop Heber High School, she went on to study Business Management at the University of Bath and graduate from the GB Rowing Team Start programme.

Before rowing, Thornley was a national championship winning show jumper, having participated since the age of twelve. She also briefly worked as a fashion model.

== Rowing career ==
Thornley began her sporting career through the "Sporting Giants" programme, becoming the first of the scheme's graduates to win a gold medal when she was successful at the 2009 World Under-23 Championships.

She was part of the British squad that topped the medal table at the 2011 World Rowing Championships in Bled, where she won a bronze medal as part of the eight with Alison Knowles, Jo Cook, Jessica Eddie, Louisa Reeve, Natasha Page, Lindsey Maguire, Katie Greves and Caroline O'Connor.

In the 2016 Summer Olympics, she was partnered with Katherine Grainger in the women's double sculls, in which they took the silver medal.

In June 2017 Thornley won the gold medal for women's single sculls in the European Rowing Championship at Račice. She won a silver medal at the 2017 World Rowing Championships in Sarasota, Florida in the single sculls.

In 2021, she won a European silver medal in the single sculls in Varese, Italy. She then finished 4th in the single sculls final at the Tokyo 2020 Olympics.

Thornley announced her retirement from rowing in November 2021.

== Personal life ==
In 2020, Thornley married retired Olympic rower Ric Egington.
