= Annemiek de Haan =

Dutch rower (born 1981)

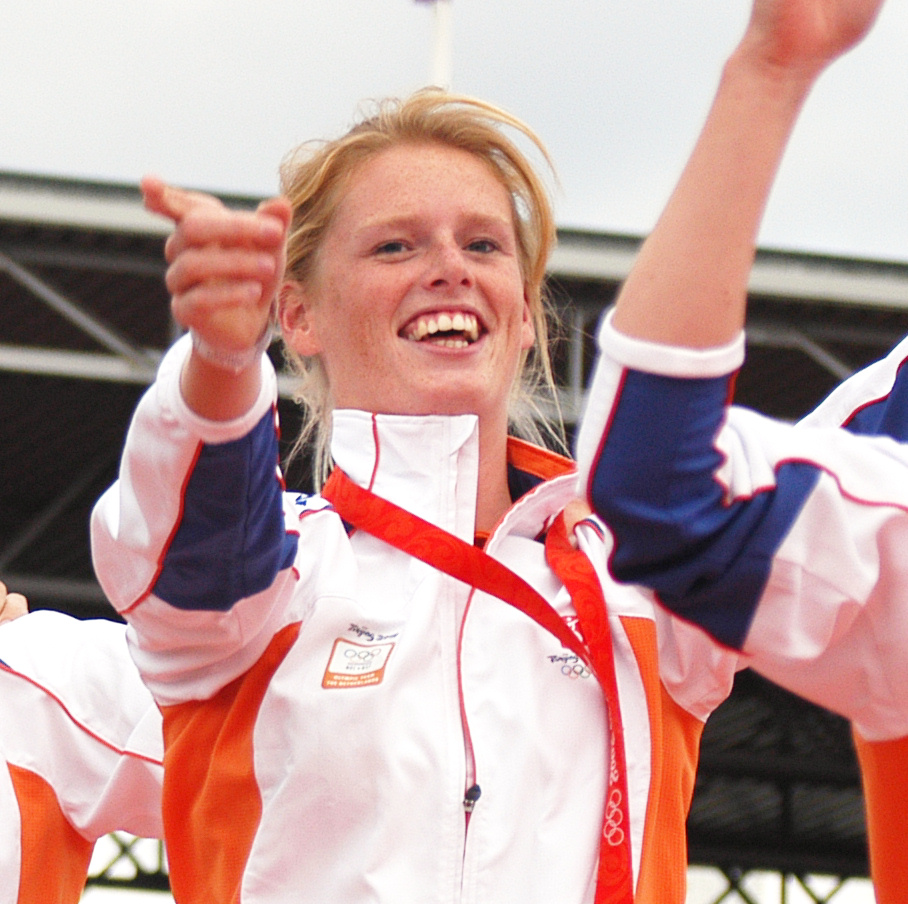

Medal record

Women's rowing

Representing the Netherlands

Olympic Games
| Silver medal – second place | 2008 Beijing | Eight |
| Bronze medal – third place | 2004 Athens | Eight |
| Bronze medal – third place | 2012 London | Eight |

World Championships
| Bronze medal – third place | 2005 Kaizu, Gifu | Eight |

Annemiek de Haan (born 15 July 1981 in Haren, Groningen) is a rower from the Netherlands.

De Haan started rowing in 1999 and made her international debut in the four at the 1999 Junior World Championships in Plovdiv. Together with Melina Bus, Anja Mourik and Mirthe Kamp she won the bronze medal. The following years De Haan was not that successful in rowing anymore, but she returned for the 2002 Under-23 World Championships in Genoa in the double sculls with Sarah Siegelaar, here they became fifth. A year later in Belgrade she formed a fours boat with Kamp, Susan van Kuijeren and Mette Beugelsdijk to claim another fifth place at the World Championships. As of 2004 she started participating in the Rowing World Cup circuit on senior level and she rowed to a fourth position in the fours with Marlies Smulders, Froukje Wegman and Hurnet Dekkers. Later in the year she took part in the Dutch eights that got to the fourth place in the World Cup in Munich, they qualified for the 2004 Summer Olympics and won the bronze medal there. The team existed of De Haan, Froukje Wegman, Marlies Smulders, Nienke Hommes, Hurnet Dekkers, Annemarieke van Rumpt, Sarah Siegelaar, Helen Tanger and cox Ester Workel.

In 2005 it was time to start with the new Dutch eights project. The team existing of De Haan, Sanne Beukers, Nienke Hommes, Hurnet Dekkers, Annemarieke van Rumpt, Laura Posthuma, Femke Dekker, Helen Tanger and Ester Workel managed to row to the second spot at the World Cup meeting in Munich straight away. With Marlies Smulders instead of Hommes they reached the same spot in Luzern. Hommes returned to the team instead of Smulders for the World Championships, while Beukers was replaced by Nienke Dekkers. This team dropped down one place and won the bronze medal. In 2006 De Haan remained in the eights and they rowed to a fifth position at the World Championships in Eton. Together with Van Rumpt she also achieved a third place in the World Cup in Luzern.

She returned to the eights in 2007 rowing to two third positions in the World Cup in Linz and Luzern as well as the first place in Amsterdam with Jacobine Veenhoven, Smulders, Hurnet Dekkers, Van Rumpt, Roline Repelaer van Driel, Sarah Siegelaar, Dekker and Workel. Then at the World Championships in Munich the team failed to achieve the A-final and had to be satisfied with the 7th position overall. In 2008 the team tried to qualify for the 2008 Summer Olympics and at the first World Cup in Munich Veenhoven was replaced by Nienke Dekkers while Hurnet Dekkers was replaced by Nienke Kingma; they finished in fourth position. Helen Tanger replaced Nienke Dekkers in the second meeting held in Luzern and another fourth position was achieved. This also meant the Olympic qualification was accomplished. At the 2008 Olympics, the Dutch team containing de Haan won the silver medal.

After qualifying for the 2012 Summer Olympics, de Haan was in the Dutch boat that won the bronze medal.
