= Jessica Eddie =

British rower (born 1984)

Jess Eddie
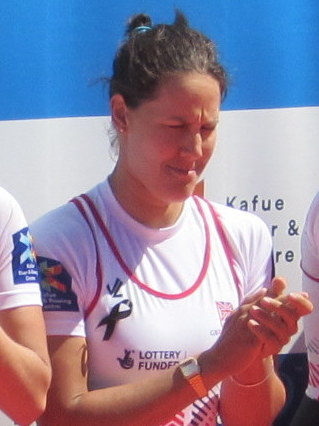
- Image of Jessica Jane Eddie

Personal information
- Full name: Jessica Jane Eddie
- Nationality: British
- Born: 7 October 1984 (age 41) Durham
Medal record
Women's rowing
Representing Great Britain
Olympic Games
Silver medal – second place	2016 Rio de Janeiro	W8+
World Championships
Bronze medal – third place	2007 Munich	W8+
Bronze medal – third place	2011 Lake Bled	W8+
European Championships
Silver medal – second place	2014 Belgrade	W8+

Jessica Jane Eddie (born 7 October 1984 in Durham) is a British rower. She won a silver medal in the women's eight at the 2016 Olympic Games in Rio de Janeiro.

== Rowing ==
=== 2011 ===
She was part of the British squad that topped the medal table at the 2011 World Rowing Championships in Bled, where she won a bronze medal as part of the eight with Alison Knowles, Jo Cook, Louisa Reeve, Natasha Page, Lindsey Maguire, Katie Greves, Victoria Thornley and Caroline O'Connor.

=== 2014 ===
On 17 March 2014 Eddie was part of the composite crew that won the Women's Eights Head of the River Race on the River Thames in London, setting a record time of 17:42.2 for the 4 1/4-mile (6.8 km) Championship Course from Mortlake to Putney. The crew comprised Heather Stanning – Army RC; Beth Rodford – Gloucester RC; Zoe Lee – Imperial College BC; Jessica Eddie – London RC; Helen Glover – Minerva Bath Rowing Club; Olivia Carnegie-Brown – Oxford Brookes University BC; Tina Stiller – Tees RC; Caragh McMurtry – Reading University BC; cox Phelan Hill – Leander Club.

On 19 April 2014 Eddie was teamed with Polly Swann for the women's pair at the British rowing trials at Caversham, Reading, where they finished 1.14 seconds behind Helen Glover and Heather Stanning.

At the British Rowing Championships on 18–19 October at Holme Pierrepont (Nottingham), Eddie was part of the composite crew that won gold in both the women's fours sweep event and the quad sculls. Racing under the acronym LIMA, the crew comprised: Jessica Eddie – London RC; Zoe Lee – Imperial College BC; Helen Glover – Minerva-Bath RC; and Heather Stanning – Army RC.

=== 2015 ===
On 14 March 2015 Eddie was part of the composite crew that won the Women's Eights Head of the River Race on the River Thames in London, setting a time of 18:58.6 for the 4 1/4-mile (6.8 km) Championship Course from Mortlake to Putney. The crew comprised Heather Stanning – Army RC; Helen Glover – Minerva-Bath RC; Zoe Lee – Imperial College BC; Katherine Grainger – Marlow RC; Melanie Wilson; Caragh McMurtry – Southampton Coalporters ARC; Olivia Carnegie-Brown – Oxford Brookes University BC; Jessica Eddie – London RC; cox Phelan Hill – Leander Club.

On 19 April 2015 Eddie and Louisa Reeve finished second in women's pair at the British rowing trials at Caversham, behind Helen Glover and Heather Stanning. They were followed by Katie Greves & Zoe Lee.

=== 2016 ===
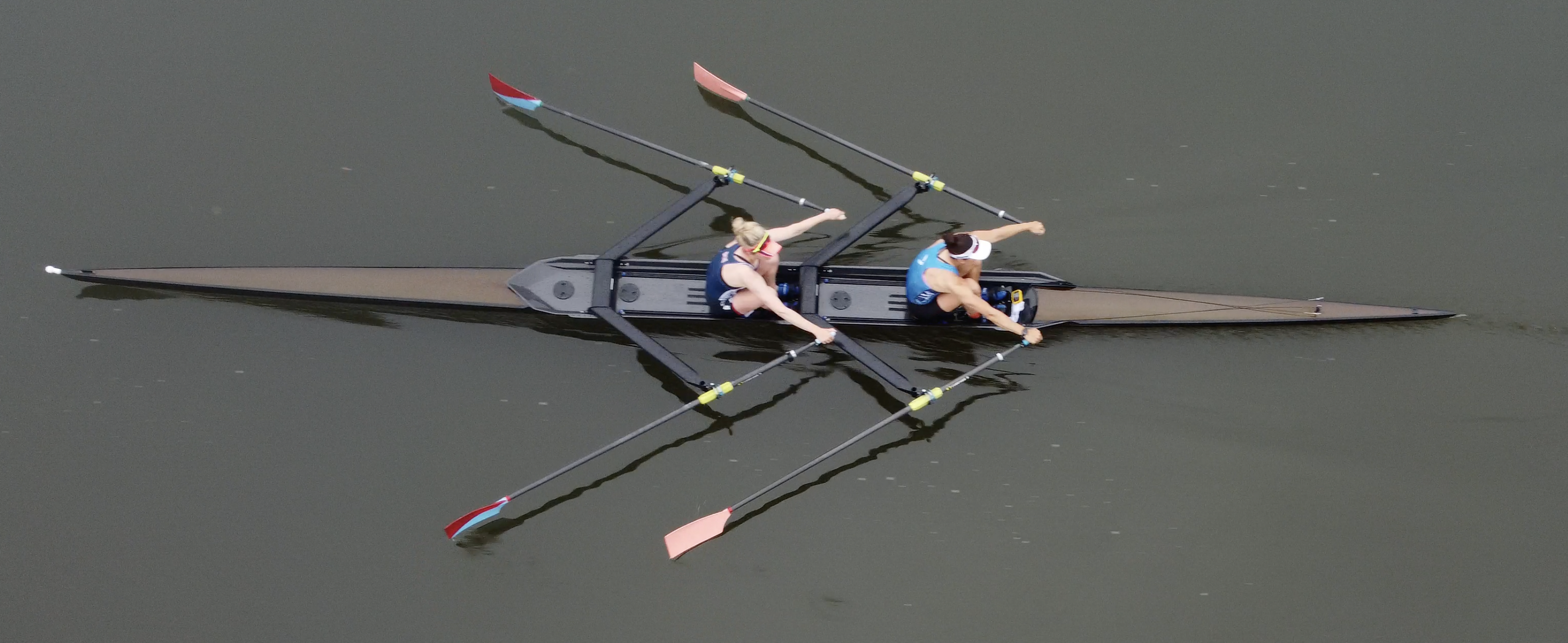
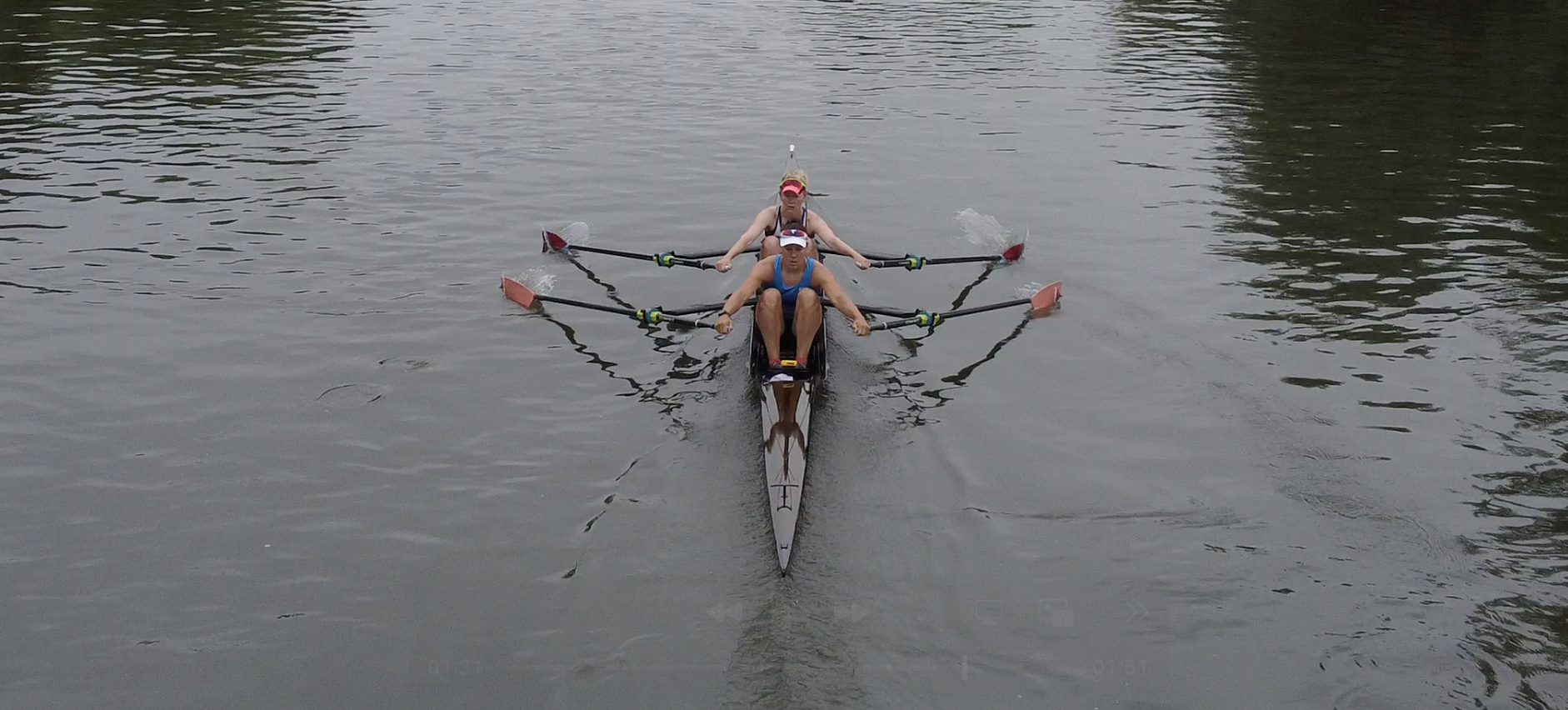
Jess Eddie (stroke) and Katie Greves (bow) training in a Fluidesign double scull at Oxford University Boat Club on 20 June 2021.

On 8 May 2016 Eddie and the GBR eight won the European Championship gold medal in Brandenburg, Germany. Narrowly beating a Netherlands and Romania crew in extremely windy conditions. The eight went on to win two silver World Cup medals in 2016, one 0.2 seconds behind the US in Lucerne and a second behind New Zealand in Poznan.
