= Sally Kehoe =

Australian rower

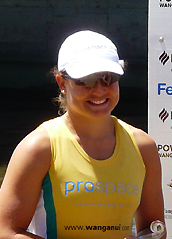
- Kehoe in 2009

Personal information
- Nationality: Australian
- Born: 25 September 1986 (age 40) Toowoomba, Queensland
- Height: 172 cm (68 in) (2012)
- Weight: 75 kg (165 lb) (2012)

Sport
- Country: Australia
- Sport: Rowing
- Club: Sydney University Women's Rowing Club
- Now coaching: N/a

Achievements and titles
- Olympic finals: Beijing 2008 W8+ London 2012 W8+
Medal record
World Championships
Bronze medal – third place	2005 Gifu	W2X
Silver medal – second place	2006 Eton	W4X
Bronze medal – third place	2014 Amsterdam	W2X

Sally Kehoe (born 25 September 1986) is an Australian former representative rower who was a national champion, three-time Olympian and a representative at multiple world championships. Since 2014 she has held the world-record time in the women's double scull over 2000m.

== Personal ==
Kehoe was born on 25 September 1986 in Toowoomba, Queensland. She went to school at Toowoomba Preparatory School before attending high school at St Margaret's Anglican Girls' School in Queensland and going on to study for a Bachelor of Business in Economics from the University of New England from 2006 to 2011. She then went on to complete a Masters lf International Fina ce from Deakin University from 2013 to 2016.

Throughout her rowing career, Sally lived predominantly in Canberra as an athlete of the Australian Institute of Sport. However, for her final rowing years, she relocated to Adelaide to be coached by the South Australian Sports' Institute's head coach at the time, Jason Lane.

After the 2016 Olympics, Sally returned to Australia to undergo significant back surgery. This ultimately was the end of her rowing career and she transitioned into a professional career at Macquarie Bank in Melbourne.

== Club and national career ==
Kehoe rowed from the Sydney University Women's Rowing Club, competed in single sculls, double sculls, quad sculls, pair, four and eight events and raced for Queensland at the national level. Throughout her career, Sally has won over 30 national titles across all boat classes.

At the Australian Rowing Championships in 2005, 2009, 2011, 2013 and 2014 she won the Nell Slater Trophy in the Interstate Women's Single Scull representing Queensland. At that annual Interstate regatta during the twelve-year period from 2005 to 2016, Kehoe was seated in the Queensland eight contesting the Queen's Cup on eight occasions (for seven 2nd places and one 4th) and rowed the single scull for Queensland on seven occasions. On four occasions at the Interstate Regatta she has raced in both the eight and the single scull on the same day.

== International rowing career ==
Kehoe rowed for Australia at the 2006 World Rowing Championships at Eton Dorney in the women's quad, with her crew making the final after beating Germany in the first heat. They took the silver medal behind Great Britain.

Kehoe competed at the 2008 Summer Olympics in the women's eight who finished sixth in the final.

At the 2011 World Rowing Championships in Bled, Slovenia Kehoe rowed in the Australian quad who finished fourth. That same year at the 2011 World Cup III in Lucerne, Switzerland she rowed in an Australian quad who finished fifth.

She rowed in the Australian eight who finished fifth at the 2012 World Cup II in Munich, Germany and fourth in the same event at the 2012 Rowing World Cup III in Lucerne, Switzerland. As a member of the VIII over a 2000-metre course that crew set a time of 6 minutes 12.36 seconds over the 2000 metre course qualifying them for the 2012 Olympics. She was then selected to represent Australia at the 2012 Summer Olympics in the VIII. She earned selection in the boat after a battle between ten women for the eight spots. Rowers in the eight boat nicknamed their team the "Motley Crew". She was seated at seven in the eight's Olympic campaign at 2012 London – the crew were disappointed with their 6th-place finish.

At the 2014 World Rowing Championships in Amsterdam Kehoe raced in Australia's double scull with Olympia Aldersey. They finished third in the final and won the bronze medal. During the preliminary racing Kehoe and Aldersey set a world-record time for 2000m of 6:37.31 This record has stood since.

Following her 2nd place behind Kim Crow in the interstate sculling title at the 2016 Australian Rowing Championships, Kehoe and Olympia Aldersey took a double scull to the 2015 World Rowing Championships at Lac d'Aiguebelette, Aiguebelette in France. In 2016 with Aldersey changed-out for Genevieve Horton from the Mosman Rowing Club, the double qualified for the 2016 Rio Olympics. Kehoe and Horton were eliminated at the semi-final stage and ultimately raced in a B final.

A back injury saw Kehoe declare her retirement from competitive rowing in 2016.

== Rugby union ==
Kehoe was named in the Melbourne Rebels Women squad for the 2020 Super W season having started playing rugby following the end of her rowing career.
