= Caroline O'Connor (rowing) =

British rowing cox

Personal information
- Full name: Caroline Teresa O'Connor
- Nationality: British
- Born: 4 October 1983 (age 42) Ealing, Greater London

Sport
- Club: Oxford Brookes University BC
Medal record
Women's rowing
Representing United Kingdom
World Rowing Championships
Bronze medal – third place	2007 Munich	W8+
Bronze medal – third place	2011 Lake Bled	W8+

Caroline Teresa O'Connor (born 25 April 1983 in Ealing) is a British rowing cox who finished fifth in the women's eight at the 2008 Summer Olympics.

== Rowing career ==
O'Connor finished in fifth place in the women's eight at the 2008 Olympic Games.

She was part of the British squad that topped the medal table at the 2011 World Rowing Championships in Bled, where she won a bronze medal as part of the eight with Alison Knowles, Jo Cook, Jessica Eddie, Louisa Reeve, Natasha Page, Lindsey Maguire, Katie Greves and Victoria Thornley.
