= Nadine Schmutzler =

German rower

Medal record

Women's rowing

Representing Germany

World Rowing Championships
| Silver medal – second place | 2006 Eton | Eight |
| Silver medal – second place | 2007 Munich | Coxless four |

European Championships
| Silver medal – second place | 2007 Poznań | Eight |

Nadine Schmutzler (born 27 April 1984 in Herdecke) is a German rower.
