= Nina Wengert =

German rower (born 1984)

Medal record

Women's rowing

Representing Germany

World Rowing Championships
Silver medal – second place	2006 Eton	Eight
Silver medal – second place	2007 Munich	Coxless four

European Championships
Silver medal – second place	2007 Poznań	Eight

Nina Wengert (born 3 August 1984 in Stuttgart) is a German rower.
