= Katie Greves =

British rower

Personal information
- Full name: Catherine Rose Greves
- Nationality: British
- Born: 2 September 1982 (age 43) London
Medal record
Women's rowing
Representing Great Britain
Olympic Games
Silver medal – second place	2016 Rio de Janeiro	W8+
World Championships
Bronze medal – third place	2011 Bled	W8+
Bronze medal – third place	2007 Munich	W8+
European Championships
Gold medal – first place	2016 Brandenburg	W8+
Silver medal – second place	2014 Belgrade	W8+
World Cup
Silver medal – second place	2016 Poznan	W8+
Silver medal – second place	2016 Lucerne	W8+
Bronze medal – third place	2015 Lucerne	W8+
Bronze medal – third place	2015 Varese	W8+
Bronze medal – third place	2014 Lucerne	W8+
Bronze medal – third place	2014 Aiguebelette	W8+
Bronze medal – third place	2012 Munich	W8+
Bronze medal – third place	2012 Belgrade	W8+
Silver medal – second place	2011 Munich	W8+
Silver medal – second place	2009 Munich	W4x
Gold medal – first place	2009 Banyoles	W4x
Bronze medal – third place	2008 Poznan	W8+
Silver medal – second place	2007 Linz	W8+
Bronze medal – third place	2006 Poznan	W8+
Bronze medal – third place	2005 Lucerne	W2-
Bronze medal – third place	2005 Eton Dorney	W8+
World U23 Championships
Bronze medal – third place	2003 Belgrade	BW2-
World Junior Championships
Bronze medal – third place	1999 Plovdiv	JW4-
Women's Cycling Time Trial
RTCC National Championship
Bronze medal – third place	2017 Cleveland	50 mile

Catherine Rose Greves, also known as Katie Greves (born 2 September 1982, London), is an Olympic Games silver medallist British rower, triple Olympian and former European Champion.

== Rowing career ==
Smaller than many of her competitors, Greves was known amongst peers for her outstanding technical proficiency and race-craft. She represented Headington School Oxford Boat Club and then University of London Boat Club whilst studying, followed by Leander Club for the majority of her international career. She is a life member of Wallingford Rowing Club. Her sister, Caroline, rowed at bow for Osiris in the 2015 reserve Women's Boat Race, and in winning became the first woman in history to cross the finish line of The Championship Course on the Tideway.

=== Olympic Games ===
Having come fifth at both the 2008 Summer Olympics in Beijing and the 2012 Summer Olympics in London, she rowed at bow in the Team GB crew that won an historic silver medal in the women's eight at the 2016 Olympic Games in Rio de Janeiro. This was the first Olympic medal that Team GB had ever won in this category.

=== World Championships ===
She was part of the British squad that topped the medal table at the 2011 World Rowing Championships in Bled, where she won a bronze medal as part of the eight with Alison Knowles, Jo Cook, Jessica Eddie, Louisa Reeve, Natasha Page, Lindsey Maguire, Victoria Thornley and Caroline O'Connor.

== Personal life ==
Greves was an English teacher at St Edward's School, Oxford. A year after retirement from the sport, she (along with Debbie Flood) rowed in the Qualifying Races for the Princess Grace Challenge Cup at Henley Royal Regatta with two 15-year-old students from Sir William Perkins's School to inspire the next generation of women rowers.

Two days later, Greves competed at the Cycling Time Trials National 50mile Time Trial Championships in Teesside, winning the bronze medal at her first major championships in the sport.
