= Sarah Siegelaar =

Dutch rower (born 1981)

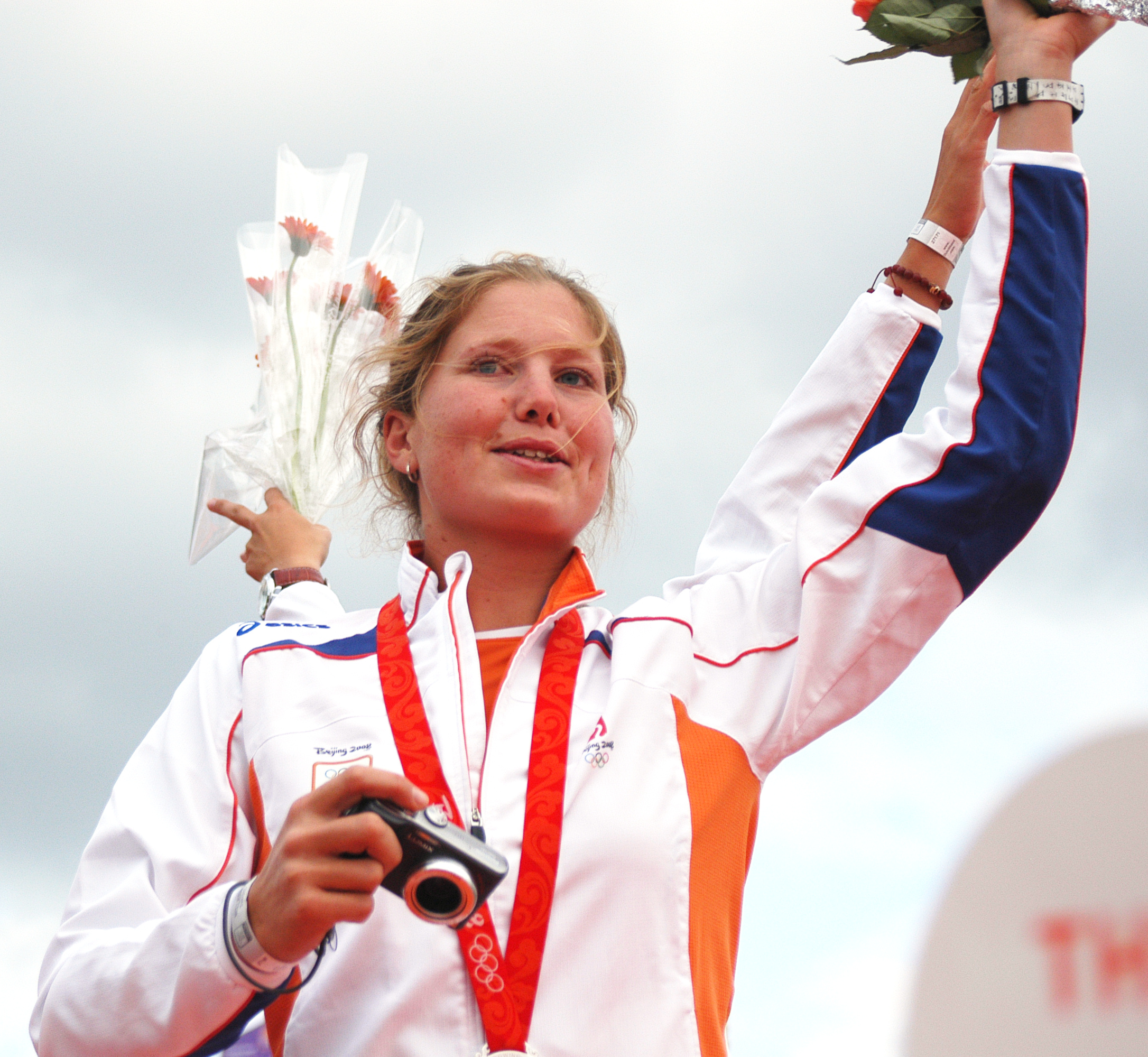

Medal record

Women's rowing

Representing the Netherlands

Olympic Games
Silver medal – second place	2008 Beijing	Women's eight
Bronze medal – third place	2004 Athens	Women's eight

Sarah Siegelaar (born 4 October 1981 in Amsterdam) is a rower from the Netherlands.

Siegelaar took part in the World Championships of 2003 in Milan winning the silver medal in the four. With the Dutch eights she qualified for the 2004 Summer Olympics in Athens and she and her teammates rowed to the bronze medal. In 2007, she returned to the eights in which the Dutch only became seventh at the World Championships. Earlier that year they won the Rowing World Cup in Amsterdam and they finished third in both Luzern and Linz.

She qualified for the 2008 Summer Olympics in Beijing with the Dutch eights forming a team with Femke Dekker, Annemiek de Haan, Roline Repelaer van Driel, Nienke Kingma, Annemarieke van Rumpt, Marlies Smulders, Helen Tanger and cox Ester Workel.
