= Katrin Reinert =

German rower

Medal record

Women's rowing

Representing Germany

European Championships
Silver medal – second place	2007 Poznań	Eight
Bronze medal – third place	2014 Belgrade	Eight

Katrin Reinert (born 13 January 1988 in Stuttgart) is a German rower.
