= Pauline Frasca =

Australian rower

Personal information
- Born: 1 July 1980 (age 45)
- Years active: 2003–08

Sport
- Sport: Rowing
- Club: Mercantile Rowing Club

Achievements and titles
- Olympic finals: Beijing 2008 W8+ London 2012 W4X
Medal record
Women's rowing
Representing Australia
World Rowing Championships
Gold medal – first place	2005 Gifu	W4-
Gold medal – first place	2005 Gifu	W8+
Silver medal – second place	2010 Karapiro	W4-
Silver medal – second place	2011 Bled	W4-

Pauline Frasca (born 1 July 1980 in Sale, Victoria) is an Australian former rower – a national champion, two-time world champion and a dual Olympian. She has represented at the elite world level as both a sculler and a sweep-oar rower.

== Club and state rowing ==
Frasca's senior rowing commenced from the Mercantile Rowing Club in Melbourne in 2001. She was the club captain in 2010 and 2011.

She was first selected to the Victorian state representative senior women's eight in 2003 to compete for the Queen Elizabeth Cup at the Interstate Regatta within the Australian Rowing Championships. She made six successive appearances for Victoria in that eight from 2003 to 2008 and saw consecutive victories from 2005 to 2008. She was back in the Victorian representative senior eight in 2009, 2010, 2011, 2013 and 2014 and saw further victories in each of those years. Eleven total appearances for nine victories.

She contested and won national titles at the Australian Rowing Championships in Mercantile club colours. From 2005 to 2010 she raced in all Victorian composite club crews for the W2-, the W4- and the eight, winning the Australian title in the pair in 2009, in the four in 2005 and 2009 and in the eight in 2005, 2006 and 2010 (in all- Mercantile crews in 2006 and 2010).

== International representative rowing ==
Frasca was first selected to Australian representative crews for the 2005 World Rowing Cups I and II in Europe where she raced in the Australian women's senior eight and in a coxless pair. The eight took gold and the pair silver at the second regatta in Munich. These performances secured Frasca's seven seat in the eight and in the Australian women's coxless four for the 2005 World Rowing Championships in Gifu, Japan. Both crews were victorious and Frasca finished 2005 – her debut representative year – as a dual World Champion.

Frasca was rowing consistently at the Australian national level in 2006 and 2007 but wasn't called back into national selection contention until the Olympic year 2008. She was picked for the eight for the World Rowing Cup II of 2008 at Lucerne and then was in the bow seat of the eight women's eight for Beijing 2008. They placed sixth.

She was back in representative crews in 2010 rowing in a pair at the World Rowing Cup III in Lucerne before being selected in the W4- for Lake Karapiro 2010. In that four with Sarah Heard, Sarah Cook and Kate Hornsey, Frasca placed second in the final and took the silver World Championship medal. With Heard and Cook changed out for Peta White and Renee Chatterton, Frasca and Hornsey were in that four again for Bled 2011 and again they brought home a silver medal.

Frasca took to sculling in the Olympic year 2012 and raced in Australian representative quad sculls in the European lead-up World Cups. At London 2012 she rowed in the women's quadruple sculls with Dana Faletic, Kerry Hore and Amy Clay to a fourth placing. She still figured in representative crews in 2014 rowing at both World Rowing Cups in sweep-oared boats and then in her final Australian appearance in the women's eight who placed fourth at the 2014 World Rowing Championships in Amsterdam.
