= Kate Hornsey =

Australian rower

Personal information
- Born: 19 October 1981 (age 44) Hobart, Tasmania, Australia
- Height: 174 cm (5 ft 9 in)
- Weight: 73 kg (161 lb)

Sport
- Country: Australia
- Sport: Rowing
- Event(s): Pair – Women (2-); Coxless Pair – Women

Achievements and titles
- Olympic finals: Beijing 2008 W8+
Medal record
Women's rowing
Representing Australia
Olympic Games
| Silver medal – second place | 2012 London | Coxless pair |
World Rowing Championships
| Gold medal – first place | 2005 Gifu | W4- |
| Gold medal – first place | 2005 Gifu | W8+ |
| Gold medal – first place | 2006 Eton | W4- |
| Silver medal – second place | 2010 Karapiro | W4- |
| Silver medal – second place | 2011 Bled | W4- |
| Bronze medal – third place | 2006 Eton | W8+ |
| Bronze medal – third place | 2011 Bled | W2- |
- Updated on 9 February 2014

Kate Hornsey (born 19 October 1981, in Hobart) is an Australian former three-time world champion, dual Olympian and Olympic silver medal-winning rower.

== Club and national rowing ==
Hornsey took up rowing when she was 12 years old in New Norfolk, Tasmania. Her senior rowing was from New Norfolk club and the Mercantile Rowing Club in Melbourne.

Hornsey was selected in the Tasmanian representative VIIIs who raced for the Queen's Cup at the Australian Rowing Championships on seven occasions from 2003 to 2008 and in 2014. She stroked all six Tasmanian Women's VIIIs who competed at the Interstate Regattas between 2004 and 2014.

== International representative rowing career ==
=== World championships ===
The typical squad changes that occur after an Olympic year as rowers take breaks or step away happened after Athens 2004 and Hornsey took her opportunities. She was selected in both the W4- and the W8+ for the 2005 World Rowing Championships in Gifu Japan. Both crews took gold with Hornsey stroking the four to her first World Championship title. The following year at Eton Dorney 2006 Horsney stroked both the eight and the four. The W8+ took bronze behind the US and Germany while the W4- won both their heat and final giving Hornsey and Robyn Selby Smith their second World Champion title in this boat class in successive years.

Horsney raced in the Australian women's eight at the 2007 World Championships to a fourth placing. She didn't compete in 2009 but at Lake Karapiro at the 2010 World Rowing Championships she stroked the Australian W4- to a silver medal. She repeated this feat at Bled 2011 earning a 2nd consecutive world silver alongside Pauline Frasca. At those same 2011 Championships she won a bronze medal in the W2- paired with Sarah Tait.

=== Olympics ===
Hornsey's first Australian Olympic selection was for Beijing 2008 when she rowed in the Australian women's eight who finished sixth. In March 2012 she was selected in the coxless pair with Sarah Tait, the pair took the silver medal at the 2012 Olympic Games in London.

Hornsey announced her retirement from competitive rowing on 24 October 2014.
