= Carla Devlin =

British rower

Medal record

Women's rowing

Representing Great Britain

World Rowing Championships
Bronze medal – third place	2007 Munich	W8+

Carla Devlin (née Ashford;born 13 March 1979 in Northallerton) is a British rower. She finished 5th in the women's eight at the 2008 Summer Olympics. In 2020 she was a contestant on the Channel 4 television show SAS: Who Dares Wins.
