= Sarah Tait =

Australian rower

Personal information
- Born: Sarah Anne Outhwaite; 23 January 1983 Perth, Western Australia
- Died: 3 March 2016 (aged 33) Melbourne, Victoria
- Home town: Melbourne
- Height: 180 cm (5 ft 11 in)
- Weight: 70 kg (154 lb)
- Spouse: Bill Tait
- Children: 2

Sport
- Country: Australia
- Sport: Rowing
- Events: Coxless pair (W2-); Eight (W8+)
- Club: Swan River Rowing Club; Mercantile Rowing Club

Achievements and titles
- Olympic finals: Beijing 2008 W8+
Medal record
Representing Australia
Olympic Games
Silver medal – second place	2012 London	Coxless pair
World Rowing Championships
Gold medal – first place	2005 Gifu	W8+
Silver medal – second place	2005 Gifu	W2-
Bronze medal – third place	2011 Lake Bled	W2-
U23 World Championships
Gold medal – first place	U23 2003 Belgrade	W2X

Sarah Anne Tait (née Outhwaite; 23 January 1983 – 3 March 2016) was an Australian rower - a national and world champion, three-time Olympian and Olympic-medal winner. She was the first mother to represent Australia in rowing at Olympic level, having returned to international competition following the birth of her daughter.

== Early life ==
Tait was born in Perth, Western Australia, one of four children of Simon and Barbara Outhwaite. She was educated at St Hilda's Anglican School for Girls in Perth. She began rowing in 1997, at the age of 14. Tait's first rowing success was in 2000, aged 17, when she won a silver medal in the junior women's four at the World Junior Rowing Championships in Zagreb, Croatia.

== Club and state rowing career ==
Tait's senior rowing was initially from the Swan River Rowing Club in Perth and later from the Mercantile Rowing Club in Melbourne.

She was selected in representative Western Australian senior women's eights competing for the Queen's Cup in the Interstate Regatta at the Australian Championships on nine occasions between 2001 and 2007. She stroked that eight in 2012. In 2003 she also raced in the West Australian youth eight who were victorious in contesting the Bicentennial Cup at the Interstate Regatta. This put her in the unique position of having represented in her state's senior women's eight for two years before she rowed in the youth eight.

Wearing Swan River RC colours she contested national Australian titles at the Australian Rowing Championships on a number of occasions. She won a national title in coxless pair in 2005 with Natalie Beal. She contested the coxless four in 2005 and 2006 and the women's eight in composite Western Australian crews in 2005, 2006 and 2007.

== International representative career ==
Tait competed at the Summer Olympics three times, in the women's eights at the 2004 and 2008 games and in the women's coxless pair at the 2012 Olympic Games in London, where she won a silver medal with Kate Hornsey. At the 500m mark of their race, Tait and Hornsey were in fourth place, but moved into third at the 1000m mark. In the last 500m, the pair passed New Zealand's world champions Rebecca Scown and Juliette Haigh, to finish second behind Britain's Heather Stanning and Helen Glover.

Tait won her first world championship title in the Australian women's eight at the 2005 World Rowing Championships in Gifu, Japan. At that same regatta she won a silver medal in a coxless pair with Natalie Bale. Six years later she won a bronze medal in a coxless pair with Kate Hornsey at the 2011 World Rowing Championships in Lake Bled.

Tait was picked as captain of the Australian women's rowing team at the 2008 and 2012 Olympic Games, and at the 2010 and 2011 World Rowing Championships.

Three months after the 2008 Olympics, Tait became pregnant with her first child. As she was determined to compete in the 2012 Olympics, she continued to train up until the last three weeks of pregnancy, and returned to her training schedule five months after giving birth. At around this time, Rowing Australia changed their policy on family visits to athletes, enabling children to visit their parents while training and competing; Tait was credited with inspiring this change.

Tait announced her retirement from competitive rowing on 26 February 2014, as she had been diagnosed with cervical cancer after the birth of her second child eleven months earlier. Although she had initially returned to rowing after undergoing chemotherapy and radiation treatment, she was later advised to retire from the sport to undergo further treatment.

== Personal life ==
Tait was married to national rowing coach Bill Tait and was a second cousin of rower David Crawshay. Her father, Simon Outhwaite, was an Australian rules footballer for South Fremantle Football Club.

Tait died on 3 March 2016, aged 33, in Melbourne, Victoria. She had been diagnosed with cervical cancer in 2013.
