= Darcy Marquardt =

Canadian rower (born 1979)

Personal information
- Born: March 22, 1979 (age 47) Vancouver, British Columbia
- Education: University of Victoria
Medal record
Women's rowing
Representing Canada
Summer Olympics
Silver medal – second place	2012 London	Women's eight
World Championships
Gold medal – first place	2006 Eton	Coxless pairs
Silver medal – second place	2002 Seville	Coxless fours
Silver medal – second place	2010 Lake Karapiro	Women's eight
Silver medal – second place	2011 Lake Bled	Women's eight
Bronze medal – third place	2003 Milan	Women's eight

Darcy Marquardt (born March 22, 1979) is a Canadian rower.

She graduated from the University of Victoria in 2005 with a major in French, and a minor in Psychology.

She has been on the National Women's Rowing Team for 10 years (2002-2012). In her first year on the team, Darcy won a silver medal in the women's fours event at the 2002 World Championships in Seville, Spain and the following year, a bronze in the eights at the 2003 World Championships and Olympic Qualifier in Milan, Italy.

She placed fourth in the 2004 Summer Olympics, with partner Buffy-Lynne Williams, and she was the 2006 World Champion in the Woman's Pairs with Jane Thornton. She finished in fourth at the 2008 Summer Olympics in the women's eight. She won two more silver medals at world championship level, both in the women's eights, in 2010 and 2011.

Most recently, Darcy won an Olympic silver medal in the Women's Eight at the 2012 Summer Olympics in London.
