= Andréanne Morin =

Canadian rower (born 1981)

Personal information
- Nationality: Canada
- Born: August 9, 1981 (age 44) Quebec City, Quebec, Canada

Sport
- Club: Montreal Rowing Club
Medal record
Women's rowing
Representing Canada
Olympic Games
Silver medal – second place	2012 London	Women's eights
World Championships
Silver medal – second place	2011 Lake Bled	Eights (W8+)
Silver medal – second place	2010 Lake Karapiro	Eights (W8+)
Bronze medal – third place	2003 Milan	Eights (W8+)

Andréanne Morin (born August 9, 1981) is a Canadian rower and Olympian.

== Career ==
Morin was an integral part of Canada's women's eights rowing team. She won medals at three world championships, a bronze medal at the 2003 World Rowing Championships and silver at the 2010 World Rowing Championships and 2011 World Rowing Championships. She was the NCAA champion in rowing 2006.

Morin was a three time Olympian finishing seventh in the 2004 Summer Olympics and in fourth place at the 2008 Summer Olympic Games in Beijing, China. At the 2012 Summer Olympics she was part the Canadian women's eight that won the silver medal.

=== Other work ===
Morin was a member of the Athlete Committee at the World Anti Doping Agency.

== Education ==
She attended The Study, graduating in grade 11 in 1998, and later attended Phillips Exeter Academy, graduating in 2000, followed by a bachelor's degree in political science at Princeton University in 2006. She also later studied law at Université de Montréal.

== Honours ==
In 2012 Morin was awarded the Queen Elizabeth II Diamond Jubilee Medal.

In 2019, an eponymous shell in her name, the A. Morin 2000, was christened and added to the Phillips Exeter Academy boathouse.

== See also ==
Princeton University Olympians
