= Susan Francia =

American rower (born 1982)

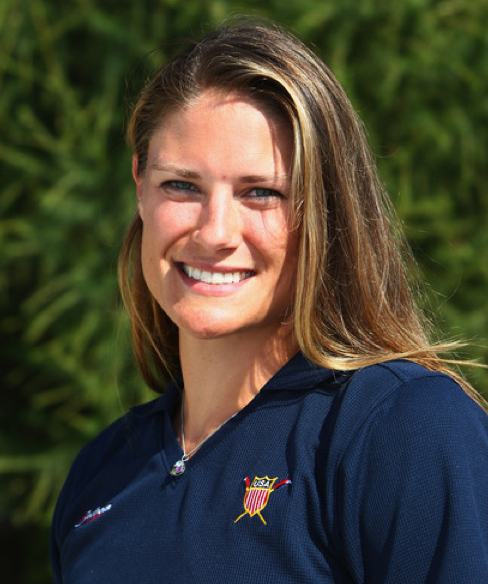

Personal information
- Full name: Zsuzsanna Francia
- Nationality: Hungarian; American
- Born: November 8, 1982 (age 43) Szeged, Hungary
- Home town: Abington, Pennsylvania, U.S.
- Parent(s): Béla Francia; Katalin Karikó
Medal record
Women's rowing
Representing the United States
Olympic Games
Gold medal – first place	2008 Beijing	Eight
Gold medal – first place	2012 London	Eight
World Championships
Gold medal – first place	2006 Dorney	Eight
Gold medal – first place	2007 Oberschleißheim	Eight
Gold medal – first place	2009 Poznań	Eight
Gold medal – first place	2009 Poznań	Coxless pair
Gold medal – first place	2011 Bled	Eight
Silver medal – second place	2014 Amsterdam	Coxless four
Bronze medal – third place	2010 Cambridge	Coxless pair

Zsuzsanna "Susan" Francia (Hungarian: Francia Zsuzsanna; born November 8, 1982) is a Hungarian-American two-time Olympic gold medalist rower. Growing up in Abington, Pennsylvania as the daughter of Nobel laureate, Hungarian biochemist and mRNA researcher Katalin Karikó, she attended Abington Senior High School, followed by the University of Pennsylvania, graduating in 2004 with a bachelor's degree in sociology of law and deviance and a master's degree in criminology. She resides in Princeton, New Jersey, and is affiliated with the US Rowing Training Center.

== Early life and education ==
Susan Francia is the daughter of Nobel laureate, Hungarian biochemist and mRNA researcher Katalin Karikó. She is fluent in Hungarian.

Francia began rowing as a sophomore at the University of Pennsylvania in 2001. She was a Collegiate Rowing Coaches Association Division I All-American at the University of Pennsylvania in 2004. She graduated from the University of Pennsylvania in 2004 with a bachelor's degree in sociology of law and deviance and a master's degree in criminology. She also earned a master's in business administration from UCLA in 2018.

== Career ==
After graduating, Francia spent ten years as a member of the U.S. Rowing Senior National Team and won gold medals in women's eight at the 2008 Olympics in Beijing, China and the 2012 Olympics in London, England.

Francia won the Remenham Challenge Cup at the 2011 and 2006 Henley Royal Regatta. At the FISA World Rowing Championships in 2006, Francia won the gold medal in the women's eight with a new world's best time of 5:55.50.

In addition to her international accomplishments, she won the championship eight at the 2005, 2006, 2007, 2009, and 2012 Head of the Charles Regatta in Cambridge, Massachusetts. She won the eight and finished third in the pair at the 2007 US Rowing National Championships. She won the double sculls at the second 2006 National Selection Regatta and finished second in the four at the 2004 U.S. National Team Trials. Francia finished second in the pair at the second 2008 National Selection Regatta, won the pair at all three 2010 Regattas and won the pair at the second 2011 Regatta.

=== Coaching ===
Francia was an assistant coach for the UCSD women's rowing team for the 2017–18 and 2018–19 seasons. In addition, she was formerly the head coach of the junior women's varsity rowing team at the San Diego Rowing Club.

== Personal life ==
In February 2021, with her husband Ryan Amos, she had a son born in the United States.
