= Elle Logan =

American rower (born 1987)

Eleanor Logan
Personal information
- Born: December 27, 1987 (age 38) Portland, Maine, U.S.
Medal record
Women's rowing
Representing the United States
Olympic Games
Gold medal – first place	2008 Beijing	Women's eight
Gold medal – first place	2012 London	Women's eight
Gold medal – first place	2016 Rio de Janeiro	Women's eight
World Championships
Gold medal – first place	2010 Karapiro	W8+
Gold medal – first place	2011 Lake Bled	W8+
Gold medal – first place	2014 Amsterdam	W8+
Silver medal – second place	2009 Poznań	W4-
Bronze medal – third place	2015 Aiguebelette	W2−

Eleanor Logan (born December 27, 1987) is an American rower. She is the first American rower to win a gold medal in three consecutive Olympics, a three-time Olympic champion and three-time world champion.

Logan was born in Portland, Maine. Logan's home town is Boothbay Harbor and she attended the Brooks School in 2003 in North Andover, Massachusetts for high school. She is affiliated with the Lake Samish Training Center.

As an undergrad at Stanford University, Logan earned her first Olympic medal at the 2008 Summer Olympics in Beijing. At Stanford the next year she raced in the 2009 varsity eight that won the Pac-10 Championships and Stanford's first NCAA Championship. That summer, she earned a silver medal at the 2009 World Championships in Poznan, Poland in the women's four. In 2010 Logan competed in the World Championships in New Zealand, capturing gold with the women's eight team. She also won gold in the 2011 World Championships in Bled, Slovenia. Logan graduated from Stanford in 2011 and then began full-time training with the U.S. Team. In 2012, she won the National Selection Regatta in the women's pair with Erin Cafaro and represented the US at two World Cups winning silver in each, earning 1st overall in points for the 2012 Samsung Rowing Cup. Both were in the U.S. women's eight that won gold at the 2012 Summer Olympics in London.

In 2013, Logan switched to sculling and won the USRowing National Selection Regatta in the women's single, earning the right to represent the US in that event at the World Championships in Chungju, Korea, where she finished fifth. In 2014, she returned to the women's eight and earned another gold medal at the World Championships in Amsterdam. In 2015, Logan and partner Felice Mueller won a bronze medal in the women's pair at the World Rowing Championships in Aiguebellete, France.

Logan was named Pac-12 Rower of the Century in 2016. She won her third consecutive Olympic gold medal in the women's eight at the 2016 Summer Olympics in Rio de Janeiro, where she was only one of two returning rowers from the crew that won gold in London as well as the only rower from the crew that won gold in Beijing.

== Personal life ==
She moved to Seattle in 2017 and married her sculling coach, Carlos Dinares.
