= Buffy-Lynne Williams =

Canadian rower

Personal information
- Born: March 27, 1977 (age 49) St. Catharines, Ontario, Canada
- Spouse: Barney Williams
Medal record
Women's rowing
Representing Canada
Olympic Games
Bronze medal – third place	2000 Sydney	Women's eight

Buffy-Lynne Williams (formerly Buffy Alexander; born March 27, 1977) is a Canadian rower. She was born in St. Catharines, Ontario.

The daughter of former National Hockey League player Claire Alexander, she began rowing at age 17. She won a bronze medal at the 2000 Summer Olympics in the eights event, and at the 1998, 1999 and 2003 world championships at Cologne, St. Catharines and Milan respectively. She also won a silver in the eights at the 1997 world championships in Lac d'Aiguebelette, France. At the 2004 Summer Olympics she was fourth in the coxless pair. She finished in fourth place at the 2008 Summer Olympics in the women's eight.

She married Canadian rower Barney Williams after the 1999 World Championships, which were held in her hometown of St. Catharines.
