= List of 2004 Summer Olympics medal winners =

This is a list of medalists at the 2004 Summer Olympics, which were held in Athens, Greece.

== Archery ==
Event	Gold	Silver	Bronze
Men's individual	Marco Galiazzo; Italy	Hiroshi Yamamoto; Japan	Tim Cuddihy; Australia
Men's team	South Korea; Im Dong-Hyun; Jang Yong-Ho; Park Kyung-Mo	Chinese Taipei; Chen Szu-yuan; Liu Ming-huang; Wang Cheng-pang	Ukraine; Dmytro Hrachov; Viktor Ruban; Oleksandr Serdyuk
Women's individual	Park Sung-hyun; South Korea	Lee Sung-Jin; South Korea	Alison Williamson; Great Britain
Women's team	South Korea; Lee Sung-Jin; Park Sung-hyun; Yun Mi-Jin	China; He Ying; Lin Sang; Zhang Juanjuan	Chinese Taipei; Chen Li Ju; Wu Hui Ju; Yuan Shu Chi

== Athletics ==
=== Track ===
==== Men's events ====
Event	Gold	Silver	Bronze
100 metres	Justin Gatlin; United States	Francis Obikwelu; Portugal	Maurice Greene; United States
200 metres	Shawn Crawford; United States	Bernard Williams; United States	Justin Gatlin; United States
400 metres	Jeremy Wariner; United States	Otis Harris; United States	Derrick Brew; United States
800 metres	Yuriy Borzakovskiy; Russia	Mbulaeni Mulaudzi; South Africa	Wilson Kipketer; Denmark
1500 metres	Hicham El Guerrouj; Morocco	Bernard Lagat; Kenya	Rui Silva; Portugal
5000 metres	Hicham El Guerrouj; Morocco	Kenenisa Bekele; Ethiopia	Eliud Kipchoge; Kenya
10,000 metres	Kenenisa Bekele; Ethiopia	Sileshi Sihine; Ethiopia	Zersenay Tadese; Eritrea
110 metres hurdles	Liu Xiang; China	Terrence Trammell; United States	Anier García; Cuba
400 metres hurdles	Félix Sánchez; Dominican Republic	Danny McFarlane; Jamaica	Naman Keïta; France
3000 metres steeplechase	Ezekiel Kemboi; Kenya	Brimin Kipruto; Kenya	Paul Kipsiele Koech; Kenya
4 × 100 metres relay	Great Britain; Jason Gardener; Darren Campbell; Marlon Devonish; Mark Lewis-Francis	United States; Shawn Crawford; Justin Gatlin; Coby Miller; Maurice Greene; Darvis Patton*	Nigeria; Olusoji Fasuba; Uchenna Emedolu; Aaron Egbele; Deji Aliu
4 × 400 metres relay	United States; Otis Harris; Derrick Brew; Jeremy Wariner; Darold Williamson; Andrew Rock*; Kelly Willie*	Australia; John Steffensen; Mark Ormrod; Patrick Dwyer; Clinton Hill	Nigeria; James Godday; Musa Audu; Saul Weigopwa; Enefiok Udo-Obong

==== Women's events ====
Event	Gold	Silver	Bronze
100 metres	Yulia Nesterenko; Belarus	Lauryn Williams; United States	Veronica Campbell; Jamaica
200 metres	Veronica Campbell; Jamaica	Allyson Felix; United States	Debbie Ferguson; Bahamas
400 metres	Tonique Williams-Darling; Bahamas	Ana Guevara; Mexico	Natalya Antyukh; Russia
800 metres	Kelly Holmes; Great Britain	Hasna Benhassi; Morocco	Jolanda Čeplak; Slovenia
1500 metres	Kelly Holmes; Great Britain	Tatyana Tomashova; Russia	Maria Cioncan; Romania
5000 metres	Meseret Defar; Ethiopia	Isabella Ochichi; Kenya	Tirunesh Dibaba; Ethiopia
10,000 metres	Xing Huina; China	Ejagayehu Dibaba; Ethiopia	Derartu Tulu; Ethiopia
100 metres hurdles	Joanna Hayes; United States	Olena Krasovska; Ukraine	Melissa Morrison; United States
400 metres hurdles	Fani Halkia; Greece	Ionela Târlea-Manolache; Romania	Tetyana Tereshchuk-Antipova; Ukraine
4 × 100 metres relay	Jamaica; Tayna Lawrence; Sherone Simpson; Aleen Bailey; Veronica Campbell; Beverly McDonald*	Russia; Olga Fyodorova; Yuliya Tabakova; Irina Khabarova; Larisa Kruglova	France; Véronique Mang; Muriel Hurtis; Sylviane Félix; Christine Arron
4 × 400 metres relay	United States; DeeDee Trotter; Monique Henderson; Sanya Richards; Monique Hennagan; Crystal Cox*; Moushaumi Robinson*	Russia; Olesya Krasnomovets; Natalya Nazarova; Olesya Zykina; Natalya Antyukh; Tatyana Firova*; Natalya Ivanova*	Jamaica; Novlene Williams; Michelle Burgher; Nadia Davy; Sandie Richards; Ronetta Smith*

=== Road ===
Event	Gold	Silver	Bronze
Men's 20 km walk	Ivano Brugnetti; Italy	Paquillo Fernández; Spain	Nathan Deakes; Australia
Women's 20 km walk	Athanasia Tsoumeleka; Greece	Olimpiada Ivanova; Russia	Jane Saville; Australia
Men's 50 km walk	Robert Korzeniowski; Poland	Denis Nizhegorodov; Russia	Aleksey Voyevodin; Russia
Men's marathon	Stefano Baldini; Italy	Mebrahtom Keflezighi; United States	Vanderlei de Lima; Brazil
Women's marathon	Mizuki Noguchi; Japan	Catherine Ndereba; Kenya	Deena Kastor; United States

=== Field ===
==== Men's events ====
Event	Gold	Silver	Bronze
high jump	Stefan Holm; Sweden	Matt Hemingway; United States	Jaroslav Bába; Czech Republic
long jump	Dwight Phillips; United States	John Moffitt; United States	Joan Lino Martínez; Spain
triple jump	Christian Olsson; Sweden	Marian Oprea; Romania	Danil Burkenya; Russia
pole vault	Timothy Mack; United States	Toby Stevenson; United States	Giuseppe Gibilisco; Italy
shot put	Adam Nelson; United States	Joachim Olsen; Denmark	Manuel Martínez Gutiérrez; Spain
discus throw	Virgilijus Alekna; Lithuania	Zoltán Kővágó; Hungary	Aleksander Tammert; Estonia
hammer throw	Koji Murofushi; Japan	Eşref Apak; Turkey	Vadim Devyatovskiy; Belarus
javelin throw	Andreas Thorkildsen; Norway	Vadims Vasiļevskis; Latvia	Sergey Makarov; Russia
decathlon	Roman Šebrle; Czech Republic	Bryan Clay; United States	Dmitriy Karpov; Kazakhstan

==== Women's events ====
Event	Gold	Silver	Bronze
high jump	Yelena Slesarenko; Russia	Hestrie Cloete; South Africa	Viktoriya Styopina; Ukraine
long jump	Tatyana Lebedeva; Russia	Irina Simagina; Russia	Tatyana Kotova; Russia
triple jump	Françoise Mbango Etone; Cameroon	Hrysopiyi Devetzi; Greece	Tatyana Lebedeva; Russia
pole vault	Yelena Isinbayeva; Russia	Svetlana Feofanova; Russia	Anna Rogowska; Poland
shot put	Yumileidi Cumbá; Cuba	Nadine Kleinert; Germany	Nadzeya Astapchuk; Belarus
discus throw	Natalya Sadova; Russia	Anastasia Kelesidou; Greece	Věra Pospíšilová-Cechlová; Czech Republic
hammer throw	Olga Kuzenkova; Russia	Yipsi Moreno; Cuba	Yunaika Crawford; Cuba
javelin throw	Osleidys Menéndez; Cuba	Steffi Nerius; Germany	Mirela Manjani; Greece
heptathlon	Carolina Klüft; Sweden	Austra Skujytė; Lithuania	Kelly Sotherton; Great Britain

* Athletes who participated in the heats only and received medals.

== Badminton ==
Event	Gold	Silver	Bronze
Men's singles	Taufik Hidayat; Indonesia	Shon Seung-mo; South Korea	Sony Dwi Kuncoro; Indonesia
Women's singles	Zhang Ning; China	Mia Audina; Netherlands	Zhou Mi; China
Men's doubles	South Korea; Kim Dong-moon; Ha Tae-kwon	South Korea; Lee Dong-soo; Yoo Yong-sung	Indonesia; Eng Hian; Flandy Limpele
Women's doubles	China; Zhang Jiewen; Yang Wei	China; Huang Sui; Gao Ling	South Korea; Ra Kyung-min; Lee Kyung-won
Mixed doubles	China; Zhang Jun; Gao Ling	Great Britain; Nathan Robertson; Gail Emms	Denmark; Jens Eriksen; Mette Schjoldager

== Baseball ==
Event	Gold	Silver	Bronze
Men's team	Cuba; Danny Betancourt; Luis Borroto; Frederich Cepeda; Yorelvis Charles; Michel Enríquez; Norberto González; Yulieski Gourriel; Pedro Luis Lazo; Roger Machado; Jonder Martínez; Danny Miranda; Frank Montieth; Vicyohandri Odelín; Adiel Palma; Eduardo Paret; Ariel Pestano; Alexei Ramírez; Eriel Sánchez; Antonio Scull; Carlos Tabares; Yoandri Urgelles; Osmani Urrutia; Manuel Vega; Norge Luis Vera	Australia; Craig Anderson; Thomas Brice; Adrian Burnside; Gavin Fingleson; Paul Gonzalez; Nick Kimpton; Brendan Kingman; Craig Lewis; Graeme Lloyd; David Nilsson; Trent Oeltjen; Wayne Ough; Chris Oxspring; Brett Roneberg; Ryan Rowland-Smith; John Stephens; Phil Stockman; Brett Tamburrino; Rich Thompson; Andrew Utting; Ben Wigmore; Glenn Williams; Jeff Williams; Rodney van Buizen	Japan; Ryoji Aikawa; Yuya Ando; Atsushi Fujimoto; Kosuke Fukudome; Hirotoshi Ishii; Hisashi Iwakuma; Hitoki Iwase; Kenji Jojima; Makoto Kaneko; Takuya Kimura; Masahide Kobayashi; Hiroki Kuroda; Daisuke Matsuzaka; Daisuke Miura; Shinya Miyamoto; Arihito Muramatsu; Norihiro Nakamura; Michihiro Ogasawara; Naoyuki Shimizu; Yoshinobu Takahashi; Yoshitomo Tani; Koji Uehara; Kazuhiro Wada; Tsuyoshi Wada

== Basketball ==
Event	Gold	Silver	Bronze
Men's team	Argentina; Carlos Delfino; Gabriel Fernández; Manu Ginóbili; Leonardo Gutiérrez; Wálter Herrmann; Alejandro Montecchia; Andrés Nocioni; Fabricio Oberto; Juan Ignacio Sánchez; Luis Scola; Hugo Sconochini; Rubén Wolkowyski	Italy; Gianluca Basile; Massimo Bulleri; Roberto Chiacig; Denis Marconato; Giacomo Galanda; Nikola Radulović; Gianmarco Pozzecco; Matteo Soragna; Michele Mian; Alex Righetti; Rodolfo Rombaldoni; Luca Garri	United States; Carmelo Anthony; Carlos Boozer; Tim Duncan; Allen Iverson; LeBron James; Richard Jefferson; Stephon Marbury; Shawn Marion; Lamar Odom; Emeka Okafor; Amar'e Stoudemire; Dwyane Wade
Women's team	United States; Sue Bird; Swintayla Cash; Tamika Catchings; Yolanda Griffith; Shannon Johnson; Lisa Leslie; Ruth Riley; Katie Smith; Dawn Staley; Sheryl Swoopes; Diana Taurasi; Tina Thompson	Australia; Suzy Batkovic; Sandra Brondello; Trisha Fallon; Kristi Harrower; Lauren Jackson; Natalie Porter; Alicia Poto; Belinda Snell; Rachael Sporn; Laura Summerton; Penny Taylor; Allison Tranquilli	Russia; Anna Arkhipova; Olga Arteshina; Yelena Baranova; Diana Goustilina; Maria Kalmykova; Elena Karpova; Ilona Korstin; Irina Osipova; Oxana Rakhmatulina; Tatiana Shchegoleva; Maria Stepanova; Natalia Vodopyanova

== Boxing ==
Event	Gold	Silver	Bronze
Light flyweight (−48 kg)	Yan Bartelemí Varela; Cuba	Atagün Yalçınkaya; Turkey	Zou Shiming; China
Light flyweight (−48 kg)	Yan Bartelemí Varela; Cuba	Atagün Yalçınkaya; Turkey	Sergey Kazakov; Russia
Flyweight (−51 kg)	Yuriorkis Gamboa Toledano; Cuba	Jérôme Thomas; France	Fuad Aslanov; Azerbaijan
Flyweight (−51 kg)	Yuriorkis Gamboa Toledano; Cuba	Jérôme Thomas; France	Rustamhodza Rahimov; Germany
Bantamweight (−54 kg)	Guillermo Rigondeaux Ortiz; Cuba	Worapoj Petchkoom; Thailand	Aghasi Mammadov; Azerbaijan
Bantamweight (−54 kg)	Guillermo Rigondeaux Ortiz; Cuba	Worapoj Petchkoom; Thailand	Bahodirjon Sooltonov; Uzbekistan
Featherweight (−57 kg)	Alexei Tichtchenko; Russia	Kim Song-Guk; North Korea	Vitali Tajbert; Germany
Featherweight (−57 kg)	Alexei Tichtchenko; Russia	Kim Song-Guk; North Korea	Jo Seok-Hwan; South Korea
Lightweight (−60 kg)	Mario César Kindelán Mesa; Cuba	Amir Khan; Great Britain	Serik Yeleuov; Kazakhstan
Lightweight (−60 kg)	Mario César Kindelán Mesa; Cuba	Amir Khan; Great Britain	Murat Khrachev; Russia
Light welterweight (−64 kg)	Manus Boonjumnong; Thailand	Yudel Johnson Cedeno; Cuba	Boris Georgiev; Bulgaria
Light welterweight (−64 kg)	Manus Boonjumnong; Thailand	Yudel Johnson Cedeno; Cuba	Ionuţ Gheorghe; Romania
Welterweight (−69 kg)	Bakhtiyar Artayev; Kazakhstan	Lorenzo Aragon Armenteros; Cuba	Kim Jung-Joo; South Korea
Welterweight (−69 kg)	Bakhtiyar Artayev; Kazakhstan	Lorenzo Aragon Armenteros; Cuba	Oleg Saitov; Russia
Middleweight (−75 kg)	Gaydarbek Gaydarbekov; Russia	Gennady Golovkin; Kazakhstan	Suriya Prasathinphimai; Thailand
Middleweight (−75 kg)	Gaydarbek Gaydarbekov; Russia	Gennady Golovkin; Kazakhstan	Andre Dirrell; United States
Light heavyweight (−81 kg)	Andre Ward; United States	Magomed Aripgadjiev; Belarus	Ahmed Ismail; Egypt
Light heavyweight (−81 kg)	Andre Ward; United States	Magomed Aripgadjiev; Belarus	Utkirbek Haydarov; Uzbekistan
Heavyweight (−91 kg)	Odlanier Solís; Cuba	Viktar Zuyev; Belarus	Mohamed Elsayed; Egypt
Heavyweight (−91 kg)	Odlanier Solís; Cuba	Viktar Zuyev; Belarus	Naser Al Shami; Syria
Super heavyweight (+91 kg)	Alexander Povetkin; Russia	Mohamed Aly; Egypt	Michel Lopez Nunez; Cuba
Super heavyweight (+91 kg)	Alexander Povetkin; Russia	Mohamed Aly; Egypt	Roberto Cammarelle; Italy

== Canoeing ==
=== Slalom ===
Event	Gold	Silver	Bronze
Men's slalom C-1	Tony Estanguet; France	Michal Martikán; Slovakia	Stefan Pfannmöller; Germany
Men's slalom C-2	Slovakia; Pavol Hochschorner; Peter Hochschorner	Germany; Marcus Becker; Stefan Henze	Czech Republic; Jaroslav Volf; Ondřej Štěpánek
Men's slalom K-1	Benoît Peschier; France	Campbell Walsh; Great Britain	Fabien Lefèvre; France
Women's slalom K-1	Elena Kaliská; Slovakia	Rebecca Giddens; United States	Helen Reeves; Great Britain

=== Sprint ===
==== Men's events ====
Event	Gold	Silver	Bronze
500 metres C-1	Andreas Dittmer; Germany	David Cal; Spain	Maksim Opalev; Russia
1,000 metres K-1	Eirik Verås Larsen; Norway	Ben Fouhy; New Zealand	Adam van Koeverden; Canada
500 metres C-2	China; Meng Guanliang; Yang Wenjun	Cuba; Ibrahim Rojas; Ledis Balceiro	Russia; Aleksandr Kostoglod; Aleksandr Kovalyov
1,000 metres C-2	Germany; Christian Gille; Tomasz Wylenzek	Russia; Aleksandr Kostoglod; Aleksandr Kovalyov	Hungary; György Kozmann; György Kolonics
500 metres K-1	Adam van Koeverden; Canada	Nathan Baggaley; Australia	Ian Wynne; Great Britain
1,000 metres K-1	David Cal; Spain	Andreas Dittmer; Germany	Attila Vajda; Hungary
500 metres K-2	Germany; Ronald Rauhe; Tim Wieskötter	Australia; Clint Robinson; Nathan Baggaley	Belarus; Raman Piatrushenka; Vadzim Makhneu
1,000 metres K-2	Sweden; Markus Oscarsson; Henrik Nilsson	Italy; Antonio Rossi; Beniamino Bonomi	Norway; Eirik Verås Larsen; Nils Olav Fjeldheim
1,000 metres K-4	Hungary; Zoltán Kammerer; Botond Storcz; Ákos Vereckei; Gábor Horváth	Germany; Andreas Ihle; Mark Zabel; Björn Bach; Stefan Ulm	Slovakia; Richard Riszdorfer; Michal Riszdorfer; Erik Vlček; Juraj Bača

==== Women's events ====
Event	Gold	Silver	Bronze
500 metres K-1	Nataša Dušev-Janić; Hungary	Josefa Idem; Italy	Caroline Brunet; Canada
500 metres K-2	Hungary; Katalin Kovács; Nataša Dušev-Janić	Germany; Birgit Fischer; Carolin Leonhardt	Poland; Aneta Pastuszka; Beata Sokołowska-Kulesza
500 metres K-4	Germany; Birgit Fischer; Maike Nollen; Katrin Wagner; Carolin Leonhardt	Hungary; Katalin Kovács; Szilvia Szabó; Erzsébet Viski; Kinga Bóta	Ukraine; Inna Osypenko; Tetyana Semykina; Hanna Balabanova; Olena Cherevatova

== Cycling ==
=== Road ===
Event	Gold	Silver	Bronze
Men's road race	Paolo Bettini; Italy	Sérgio Paulinho; Portugal	Axel Merckx; Belgium
Women's road race	Sara Carrigan; Australia	Judith Arndt; Germany	Olga Slyusareva; Russia
Men's time trial	Viatcheslav Ekimov; Russia	Bobby Julich; United States	Michael Rogers; Australia
Women's time trial	Leontien Zijlaard-Van Moorsel; Netherlands	Deirdre Demet-Barry; United States	Karin Thürig; Switzerland

=== Track ===
==== Men's events ====
Event	Gold	Silver	Bronze
Keirin	Ryan Bayley; Australia	José Antonio Escuredo; Spain	Shane Kelly; Australia
Madison	Australia; Graeme Brown; Stuart O'Grady	Switzerland; Franco Marvulli; Bruno Risi	Great Britain; Rob Hayles; Bradley Wiggins
points race	Mikhail Ignatiev; Russia	Joan Llaneras; Spain	Guido Fulst; Germany
pursuit	Bradley Wiggins; Great Britain	Brad McGee; Australia	Sergi Escobar; Spain
team pursuit	Australia; Graeme Brown; Brett Lancaster; Brad McGee; Luke Roberts	Great Britain; Steve Cummings; Rob Hayles; Paul Manning; Bradley Wiggins	Spain; Carlos Castaño; Sergi Escobar; Asier Maeztu; Carlos Torrent
sprint	Ryan Bayley; Australia	Theo Bos; Netherlands	René Wolff; Germany
team sprint	Germany; Jens Fiedler; Stefan Nimke; René Wolff	Japan; Toshiaki Fushimi; Masaki Inoue; Tomohiro Nagatsuka	France; Mickaël Bourgain; Laurent Gané; Arnaud Tournant
time trial	Chris Hoy; Great Britain	Arnaud Tournant; France	Stefan Nimke; Germany

==== Women's events ====
Event	Gold	Silver	Bronze
points race	Olga Slyusareva; Russia	Belem Guerrero Méndez; Mexico	María Luisa Calle; Colombia
pursuit	Sarah Ulmer; New Zealand	Katie Mactier; Australia	Leontien van Moorsel; Netherlands
sprint	Lori-Ann Muenzer; Canada	Tamilla Abassova; Russia	Anna Meares; Australia
time trial	Anna Meares; Australia	Jiang Yonghua; China	Natallia Tsylinskaya; Belarus

=== Mountain bike ===
Event	Gold	Silver	Bronze
Men's cross-country	Julien Absalon; France	José Antonio Hermida; Spain	Bart Brentjens; Netherlands
Women's cross-country	Gunn-Rita Dahle Flesjå; Norway	Marie-Hélène Prémont; Canada	Sabine Spitz; Germany

== Diving ==
=== Men's events ===
Event	Gold	Silver	Bronze
3 m springboard	Peng Bo; China	Alexandre Despatie; Canada	Dmitri Sautin; Russia
10 m platform	Hu Jia; China	Mathew Helm; Australia	Tian Liang; China
Synchronized 3 m springboard	Thomas Bimis and Nikolaos Siranidis (GRE)	Tobias Schellenberg and Andreas Wels (GER)	Steven Barnett and Robert Newbery (AUS)
Synchronized 10 m platform	Tian Liang and Yang Jinghui (CHN)	Peter Waterfield and Leon Taylor (GBR)	Mathew Helm and Robert Newbery (AUS)

=== Women's events ===
Event	Gold	Silver	Bronze
3 m springboard	Guo Jingjing; China	Wu Minxia; China	Yulia Pakhalina; Russia
10 m platform	Chantelle Newbery; Australia	Lao Lishi; China	Loudy Tourky; Australia
Synchronized 3 m springboard	Wu Minxia and Guo Jingjing (CHN)	Vera Ilina and Yulia Pakhalina (RUS)	Irina Lashko and Chantelle Newbery (AUS)
Synchronized 10 m platform	Lao Lishi and Li Ting (CHN)	Natalia Goncharova and Yulia Koltunova (RUS)	Blythe Hartley and Émilie Heymans (CAN)

== Equestrian ==
Event	Gold	Silver	Bronze
Individual dressage	Anky van Grunsven; Netherlands	Ulla Salzgeber; Germany	Beatriz Ferrer-Salat; Spain
Team dressage	Germany; Heike Kemmer; Hubertus Schmidt; Martin Schaudt; Ulla Salzgeber	Spain; Beatriz Ferrer-Salat; Juan Antonio Jimenez; Ignacio Rambla; Rafael Soto	United States; Lisa Wilcox; Günter Seidel; Deborah McDonald; Robert Dover
Individual eventing	Leslie Law; Great Britain	Kimberly Severson; United States	Pippa Funnell; Great Britain
Team eventing	France; Arnaud Boiteau; Cédric Lyard; Didier Courrèges; Jean Teulère; Nicolas Touzaint	Great Britain; Jeanette Brakewell; Mary King; Leslie Law; Pippa Funnell; William Fox-Pitt	United States; Kimberly Severson; Darren Chiacchia; John Williams; Amy Tryon; Julie Richards
Individual jumping	Rodrigo Pessoa; Brazil	Chris Kappler; United States	Marco Kutscher; Germany
Team jumping	United States; Peter Wylde; McLain Ward; Beezie Madden; Chris Kappler	Sweden; Rolf-Göran Bengtsson; Malin Baryard; Peter Eriksson; Peder Fredericson	Germany; Otto Becker; Marco Kutscher; Christian Ahlmann

== Fencing ==
=== Men's events ===
Event	Gold	Silver	Bronze
individual épée	Marcel Fischer; Switzerland	Wang Lei; China	Pavel Kolobkov; Russia
team épée	France; Fabrice Jeannet; Jérôme Jeannet; Hugues Obry; Érik Boisse	Hungary; Gábor Boczkó; Krisztián Kulcsár; Iván Kovács; Géza Imre	Germany; Sven Schmid; Jörg Fiedler; Daniel Strigel
individual foil	Brice Guyart; France	Salvatore Sanzo; Italy	Andrea Cassarà; Italy
team foil	Italy; Andrea Cassarà; Salvatore Sanzo; Simone Vanni	China; Dong Zhaozhi; Wang Haibin; Wu Hanxiong; Ye Chong	Russia; Renal Ganeev; Youri Moltchan; Rouslan Nassiboulline; Vyacheslav Pozdnyakov
individual sabre	Aldo Montano; Italy	Zsolt Nemcsik; Hungary	Vladislav Tretiak; Ukraine
team sabre	France; Julien Pillet; Damien Touya; Gaël Touya	Italy; Aldo Montano; Gianpiero Pastore; Luigi Tarantino	Russia; Sergey Sharikov; Aleksey Dyachenko; Stanislav Pozdnyakov; Aleksey Yakimenko

=== Women's events ===
Event	Gold	Silver	Bronze
individual épée	Tímea Nagy; Hungary	Laura Flessel-Colovic; France	Maureen Nisima; France
team épée	Russia; Karina Aznavourian; Oxana Ermakova; Tatiana Logounova; Anna Sivkova	Germany; Claudia Bokel; Imke Duplitzer; Britta Heidemann	France; Sarah Daninthe; Laura Flessel-Colovic; Hajnalka Kiraly Picot; Maureen Nisima
individual foil	Valentina Vezzali; Italy	Giovanna Trillini; Italy	Sylwia Gruchała; Poland
individual sabre	Mariel Zagunis; United States	Tan Xue; China	Sada Jacobson; United States

== Field hockey ==
Event	Gold	Silver	Bronze
Men's team	Australia; Michael Brennan; Travis Brooks; Dean Butler; Liam de Young; Jamie Dwyer; Nathan Eglington; Troy Elder; Bevan George; Robert Hammond; Mark Hickman; Mark Knowles; Brent Livermore; Michael McCann; Stephen Mowlam; Grant Schubert; Matthew Wells	Netherlands; Matthijs Brouwer; Ronald Brouwer; Jeroen Delmee; Teun de Nooijer; Geert-Jan Derikx; Rob Derikx; Marten Eikelboom; Floris Evers; Erik Jazet; Karel Klaver; Jesse Mahieu; Rob Reckers; Taeke Taekema; Sander van der Weide; Klaas Veering; Guus Vogels	Germany; Clemens Arnold; Christoph Bechmann; Sebastian Biederlack; Philipp Crone; Eike Duckwitz; Christoph Eimer; Björn Emmerling; Florian Kunz; Björn Michel; Sascha Reinelt; Justus Scharowsky; Christian Schulte; Timo Weß; Tibor Weißenborn; Matthias Witthaus; Christopher Zeller
Women's team	Germany; Tina Bachmann; Caroline Casaretto; Nadine Ernsting-Krienke; Franziska Gude; Mandy Haase; Natascha Keller; Denise Klecker; Anke Kühn; Badri Latif; Heike Lätzsch; Sonja Lehmann; Silke Müller; Fanny Rinne; Marion Rodewald; Louisa Walter; Julia Zwehl	Netherlands; Minke Booij; Ageeth Boomgaardt; Chantal de Bruijn; Lisanne de Roever; Mijntje Donners; Sylvia Karres; Fatima Moreira de Melo; Eefke Mulder; Maartje Scheepstra; Janneke Schopman; Clarinda Sinnige; Minke Smabers; Jiske Snoeks; Macha van der Vaart; Miek van Geenhuizen; Lieve van Kessel	Argentina; Paola Vukojicic; Cecilia Rognoni; Mariné Russo; Ayelén Stepnik; María de la Paz Hernández; Mercedes Margalot; Vanina Oneto; Soledad García; Mariana González; Alejandra Gulla; Luciana Aymar; Claudia Burkart; Marina di Giacomo; Magdalena Aicega; Mariela Antoniska; Inés Arrondo

== Football ==
Event	Gold	Silver	Bronze
Men's team	Argentina; Roberto Ayala; Nicolás Burdisso; Wilfredo Caballero; Fabricio Coloccini; César Delgado; Andrés D'Alessandro; Leandro Fernández; Luciano Figueroa; Cristian 'Kily' González; Luis González; Mariano González; Gabriel Heinze; Germán Lux; Javier Mascherano; Nicolás Medina; Clemente Rodríguez; Mauro Rosales; Javier Saviola; Carlos Tevez	Paraguay; Rodrigo Romero; Emilio Martínez; Julio Manzur; Carlos Gamarra; José Devaca; Celso Esquivel; Pablo Giménez; Edgar Barreto; Fredy Barreiro; Diego Figueredo; Aureliano Torres; Pedro Benítez; Julio César Enciso; Julio González; Ernesto Cristaldo; Osvaldo Díaz; José Cardozo; Diego Barreto	Italy; Marco Amelia; Andrea Barzagli; Daniele Bonera; Cesare Bovo; Giorgio Chiellini; Daniele De Rossi; Simone Del Nero; Marco Donadel; Matteo Ferrari; Andrea Gasbarroni; Alberto Gilardino; Emiliano Moretti; Giandomenico Mesto; Angelo Palombo; Ivan Pelizzoli; Giampiero Pinzi; Andrea Pirlo; Giuseppe Sculli
Women's team	United States; Briana Scurry; Heather Mitts; Christie Rampone; Cat Reddick; Lindsay Tarpley; Brandi Chastain; Shannon Boxx; Angela Hucles; Mia Hamm; Aly Wagner; Julie Foudy; Cindy Parlow; Kristine Lilly; Joy Fawcett; Kate Markgraf; Abby Wambach; Heather O'Reilly; Kristin Luckenbill	Brazil; Daniela; Juliana; Renata Costa; Roseli; Mônica; Maycon; Rosana; Elaine; Pretinha; Formiga; Grazielle; Aline; Tânia; Cristiane; Andréia; Maravilha; Marta; Dayane	Germany; Silke Rottenberg; Kerstin Stegemann; Kerstin Garefrekes; Steffi Jones; Sarah Günther; Viola Odebrecht; Pia Wunderlich; Petra Wimbersky; Birgit Prinz; Renate Lingor; Martina Müller; Navina Omilade; Sandra Minnert; Isabell Bachor; Sonja Fuss; Conny Pohlers; Ariane Hingst; Nadine Angerer

== Gymnastics ==
=== Artistic ===
==== Men's events ====
Event	Gold	Silver	Bronze
individual all-around	Paul Hamm; United States	Kim Dae-Eun; South Korea	Yang Tae-Young; South Korea
team all-around	Japan; Takehiro Kashima; Hisashi Mizutori; Daisuke Nakano; Hiroyuki Tomita; Naoya Tsukahara; Isao Yoneda	United States; Jason Gatson; Morgan Hamm; Paul Hamm; Brett McClure; Blaine Wilson; Guard Young	Romania; Marian Drăgulescu; Ilie Daniel Popescu; Dan Nicolae Potra; Răzvan Dorin Şelariu; Ioan Silviu Suciu; Marius Urzică
floor exercise	Kyle Shewfelt; Canada	Marian Drăgulescu; Romania	Yordan Yovchev; Bulgaria
horizontal bar	Igor Cassina; Italy	Paul Hamm; United States	Isao Yoneda; Japan
parallel bars	Valeri Goncharov; Ukraine	Hiroyuki Tomita; Japan	Li Xiaopeng; China
pommel horse	Teng Haibin; China	Marius Urzică; Romania	Takehiro Kashima; Japan
rings	Dimosthenis Tampakos; Greece	Yordan Yovchev; Bulgaria	Jury Chechi; Italy
vault	Gervasio Deferr; Spain	Jevgēņijs Saproņenko; Latvia	Marian Drăgulescu; Romania

==== Women's events ====
Event	Gold	Silver	Bronze
individual all-around	Carly Patterson; United States	Svetlana Khorkina; Russia	Zhang Nan; China
team all-around	Romania; Oana Ban; Alexandra Eremia; Cătălina Ponor; Monica Roşu; Nicoleta Daniela Şofronie; Silvia Stroescu	United States; Mohini Bhardwaj; Annia Hatch; Terin Humphrey; Courtney Kupets; Courtney McCool; Carly Patterson	Russia; Liudmila Ezhova; Svetlana Khorkina; Maria Krioutchkova; Anna Pavlova; Elena Zamolodchikova; Natalia Ziganchina
balance beam	Cătălina Ponor; Romania	Carly Patterson; United States	Alexandra Eremia; Romania
floor exercise	Cătălina Ponor; Romania	Nicoleta Daniela Şofronie; Romania	Patricia Moreno; Spain
uneven bars	Émilie Le Pennec; France	Terin Humphrey; United States	Courtney Kupets; United States
vault	Monica Roşu; Romania	Annia Hatch; United States	Anna Pavlova; Russia

=== Rhythmic ===
Event	Gold	Silver	Bronze
individual all-around	Alina Kabaeva; Russia	Irina Tchachina; Russia	Anna Bessonova; Ukraine
team all-around	Russia; Olesia Beluguina; Olga Glatskikh; Tatiana Kurbakova; Natalia Lavrova; Elena Murzina; Yelena Posevina	Italy; Elisa Blanchi; Fabrizia D'Ottavio; Marinella Falca; Daniela Masseroni; Elisa Santoni; Laura Vernizzi	Bulgaria; Zhaneta Ilieva; Eleonora Kezhova; Zornitsa Marinova; Kristina Ranguelova; Galina Tancheva; Vladislava Tancheva

=== Trampoline ===
Event	Gold	Silver	Bronze
Men's	Yuri Nikitin; Ukraine	Alexander Moskalenko; Russia	Henrik Stehlik; Germany
Women's	Anna Dogonadze; Germany	Karen Cockburn; Canada	Huang Shanshan; China

== Handball ==
Event	Gold	Silver	Bronze
Men's team	Croatia; Venio Losert; Vlado Šola; Valter Matošević; Nikša Kaleb; Ivano Balić; Blaženko Lacković; Vedran Zrnić; Igor Vori; Davor Dominiković; Mirza Džomba; Drago Vuković; Slavko Goluža; Goran Šprem; Denis Špoljarić; Petar Metličić	Germany; Henning Fritz; Christian Ramota; Pascal Hens; Mark Dragunski; Stefan Kretzschmar; Jan Olaf Immel; Christian Schwarzer; Klaus-Dieter Petersen; Volker Zerbe; Markus Baur; Christian Zeitz; Torsten Jansen; Daniel Stephan; Florian Kehrmann	Russia; Andrey Lavrov; Alexey Kostygov; Vitali Ivanov; Oleg Kuleshov; Denis Krivoshlykov; Alexandre Tuchkin; Vasily Kudinov; Pavel Bashkin; Dmitri Torgovanov; Alexander Gorbatikov; Alexey Rastvortsev; Viatcheslav Gorpichin; Sergey Pogorelov; Mikhail Chipurin; Eduard Kokcharov
Women's team	Denmark; Kristine Andersen; Karen Brødsgaard; Line Daugaard; Katrine Fruelund; Trine Jensen; Rikke Hørlykke Jørgensen; Lotte Kiærskou; Henriette Mikkelsen; Karin Mortensen; Louise Nørgaard; Rikke Petersen-Schmidt; Rikke Skov; Camilla Thomsen; Josephine Touray; Mette Vestergaard	South Korea; Myoung Bok-Hee; Kim Cha-Youn; Lee Gong-Joo; Kim Hyun-Ok; Choi Im-jeong; Moon Kyeong-Ha; Lim O-Kyeong; Moon Pil-Hee; Lee Sang-Eun; Oh Seong-Ok; Jang So-Hee; Huh Soon-Young; Woo Sun-Hee; Oh Yong-Ran; Huh Young-Sook	Ukraine; Natalia Borysenko; Iryna Honcharova; Larysa Zaspa; Ganna Burmystrova; Tetyana Shynkarenko; Maryna Vergelyuk; Olena Yatsenko; Ganna Siukalo; Olena Radchenko; Olena Tsyhytsia; Galyna Markushevska; Lyudmyla Shevchenko; Nataliya Lyapina; Anastasiya Borodina; Oxana Rayhel

== Judo ==
=== Men's events ===
Event	Gold	Silver	Bronze
Extra lightweight (−60 kg)	Tadahiro Nomura; Japan	Nestor Khergiani; Georgia	Khashbaataryn Tsagaanbaatar; Mongolia
Extra lightweight (−60 kg)	Tadahiro Nomura; Japan	Nestor Khergiani; Georgia	Choi Min-Ho; South Korea
Half lightweight (−66 kg)	Masato Uchishiba; Japan	Jozef Krnáč; Slovakia	Georgi Georgiev; Bulgaria
Half lightweight (−66 kg)	Masato Uchishiba; Japan	Jozef Krnáč; Slovakia	Yordanis Arencibia; Cuba
Lightweight (−73 kg)	Lee Won-Hee; South Korea	Vitaliy Makarov; Russia	Leandro Guilheiro; Brazil
Lightweight (−73 kg)	Lee Won-Hee; South Korea	Vitaliy Makarov; Russia	Jimmy Pedro; United States
Half middleweight (−81 kg)	Ilias Iliadis; Greece	Roman Gontyuk; Ukraine	Dmitri Nossov; Russia
Half middleweight (−81 kg)	Ilias Iliadis; Greece	Roman Gontyuk; Ukraine	Flávio Canto; Brazil
Middleweight (−90 kg)	Zurab Zviadauri; Georgia	Hiroshi Izumi; Japan	Mark Huizinga; Netherlands
Middleweight (−90 kg)	Zurab Zviadauri; Georgia	Hiroshi Izumi; Japan	Khasanbi Taov; Russia
Half heavyweight (−100 kg)	Ihar Makarau; Belarus	Jang Sung-ho; South Korea	Ariel Ze'evi; Israel
Half heavyweight (−100 kg)	Ihar Makarau; Belarus	Jang Sung-ho; South Korea	Michael Jurack; Germany
Heavyweight (+100 kg)	Keiji Suzuki; Japan	Tamerlan Tmenov; Russia	Indrek Pertelson; Estonia
Heavyweight (+100 kg)	Keiji Suzuki; Japan	Tamerlan Tmenov; Russia	Dennis van der Geest; Netherlands

=== Women's events ===
Event	Gold	Silver	Bronze
Extra lightweight (−48 kg)	Ryoko Tani; Japan	Frédérique Jossinet; France	Gao Feng; China
Extra lightweight (−48 kg)	Ryoko Tani; Japan	Frédérique Jossinet; France	Julia Matijass; Germany
Half lightweight (−52 kg)	Xian Dongmei; China	Yuki Yokosawa; Japan	Ilse Heylen; Belgium
Half lightweight (−52 kg)	Xian Dongmei; China	Yuki Yokosawa; Japan	Amarilis Savón; Cuba
Lightweight (−57 kg)	Yvonne Bönisch; Germany	Kye Sun-hui; North Korea	Deborah Gravenstijn; Netherlands
Lightweight (−57 kg)	Yvonne Bönisch; Germany	Kye Sun-hui; North Korea	Yurisleidy Lupetey; Cuba
Half middleweight (−63 kg)	Ayumi Tanimoto; Japan	Claudia Heill; Austria	Driulis González; Cuba
Half middleweight (−63 kg)	Ayumi Tanimoto; Japan	Claudia Heill; Austria	Urška Žolnir; Slovenia
Middleweight (−70 kg)	Masae Ueno; Japan	Edith Bosch; Netherlands	Qin Dongya; China
Middleweight (−70 kg)	Masae Ueno; Japan	Edith Bosch; Netherlands	Annett Böhm; Germany
Half heavyweight (−78 kg)	Noriko Anno; Japan	Liu Xia; China	Yurisel Laborde; Cuba
Half heavyweight (−78 kg)	Noriko Anno; Japan	Liu Xia; China	Lucia Morico; Italy
Heavyweight (+78 kg)	Maki Tsukada; Japan	Daima Beltrán; Cuba	Tea Donguzashvili; Russia
Heavyweight (+78 kg)	Maki Tsukada; Japan	Daima Beltrán; Cuba	Sun Fuming; China

== Modern pentathlon ==
Event	Gold	Silver	Bronze
Men's	Andrey Moiseev; Russia	Andrejus Zadneprovskis; Lithuania	Libor Capalini; Czech Republic
Women's	Zsuzsanna Vörös; Hungary	Jeļena Rubļevska; Latvia	Georgina Harland; Great Britain

== Rowing ==
=== Men's events ===
Event	Gold	Silver	Bronze
single sculls	Olaf Tufte; Norway	Jüri Jaanson; Estonia	Ivo Yanakiev; Bulgaria
double sculls	France; Sébastien Vieilledent; Adrien Hardy	Slovenia; Luka Špik; Iztok Čop	Italy; Rossano Galtarossa; Alessio Sartori
lightweight double sculls	Poland; Tomasz Kucharski; Robert Sycz	France; Frédéric Dufour; Pascal Touron	Greece; Vasileios Polymeros; Nikolaos Skiathitis
quadruple sculls	Russia; Nikolay Spinyov; Igor Kravtsov; Aleksey Svirin; Sergey Fedorovtsev	Czech Republic; David Kopřiva; Tomáš Karas; Jakub Hanák; David Jirka	Ukraine; Sergij Grin; Serhiy Biloushchenko; Oleh Lykov; Leonid Shaposhnykov
coxless pair	Australia; Drew Ginn; James Tomkins	Croatia; Siniša Skelin; Nikša Skelin	South Africa; Donovan Cech; Ramon di Clemente
coxless four	Great Britain; Steve Williams; James Cracknell; Ed Coode; Matthew Pinsent	Canada; Cameron Baerg; Thomas Herschmiller; Jake Wetzel; Barney Williams	Italy; Lorenzo Porzio; Dario Dentale; Luca Agamennoni; Raffaello Leonardo
lightweight coxless four	Denmark; Thor Kristensen; Thomas Ebert; Stephan Mølvig; Eskild Ebbesen	Australia; Glen Loftus; Anthony Edwards; Ben Cureton; Simon Burgess	Italy; Lorenzo Bertini; Catello Amarante; Salvatore Amitrano; Bruno Mascarenhas
eight	United States; Jason Read; Wyatt Allen; Chris Ahrens; Joseph Hansen; Matt Deakin; Dan Beery; Beau Hoopman; Bryan Volpenhein; Peter Cipollone (cox)	Netherlands; Matthijs Vellenga; Gijs Vermeulen; Jan-Willem Gabriëls; Daniël Mensch; Geert-Jan Derksen; Gerritjan Eggenkamp; Diederik Simon; Michiel Bartman; Chun Wei Cheung (cox)	Australia; Stefan Szczurowski; Stuart Reside; Stuart Welch; James Stewart; Geoff Stewart; Bo Hanson; Mike McKay; Stephen Stewart; Michael Toon (cox)

=== Women's events ===
Event	Gold	Silver	Bronze
single sculls	Katrin Rutschow-Stomporowski; Germany	Ekaterina Karsten; Belarus	Rumyana Neykova; Bulgaria
double sculls	New Zealand; Georgina Evers-Swindell; Caroline Evers-Swindell	Germany; Peggy Waleska; Britta Oppelt	Great Britain; Sarah Winckless; Elise Laverick
lightweight double sculls	Romania; Constanța Burcică; Angela Alupei	Germany; Daniela Reimer; Claudia Blasberg	Netherlands; Kirsten van der Kolk; Marit van Eupen
quadruple sculls	Germany; Kathrin Boron; Meike Evers; Manuela Lutze; Kerstin El Qalqili	Great Britain; Alison Mowbray; Debbie Flood; Frances Houghton; Rebecca Romero	Australia; Dana Faletic; Rebecca Sattin; Amber Bradley; Kerry Hore
coxless pair	Romania; Georgeta Damian; Viorica Susanu	Great Britain; Katherine Grainger; Cath Bishop	Belarus; Yuliya Bichyk; Natallia Helakh
eight	Romania; Rodica Florea; Viorica Susanu; Aurica Bărăscu; Ioana Papuc; Liliana Gafencu; Elisabeta Lipă; Georgeta Damian; Doina Ignat; Elena Georgescu (cox)	United States; Kate Johnson; Samantha Magee; Megan Dirkmaat; Alison Cox; Caryn Davies; Laurel Korholz; Anna Mickelson; Lianne Nelson; Mary Whipple (cox)	Netherlands; Froukje Wegman; Marlies Smulders; Nienke Hommes; Hurnet Dekkers; Annemarieke van Rumpt; Annemiek de Haan; Sarah Siegelaar; Helen Tanger; Ester Workel (cox)

== Sailing ==
Event	Gold	Silver	Bronze
Men's sailboard	Gal Fridman; Israel	Nikolaos Kaklamanakis; Greece	Nick Dempsey; Great Britain
Women's sailboard	Faustine Merret; France	Yin Jian; China	Alessandra Sensini; Italy
Men's 470 class	United States; Paul Foerster; Kevin Burnham	Great Britain; Nick Rogers; Joe Glanfield	Japan; Kazuto Seki; Kenjiro Todoroki
Women's 470 class	Greece; Sofia Bekatorou; Aimilia Tsoulfa	Spain; Natalia Vía Dufresne; Sandra Azón	Sweden; Therese Torgersson; Vendela Zachrisson
Europe class	Siren Sundby; Norway	Lenka Smidova; Czech Republic	Signe Livbjerg; Denmark
Finn class	Ben Ainslie; Great Britain	Rafael Trujillo; Spain	Mateusz Kusznierewicz; Poland
Laser class	Robert Scheidt; Brazil	Andreas Geritzer; Austria	Vasilij Žbogar; Slovenia
Star class	Brazil; Marcelo Ferreira; Torben Grael	Canada; Ross MacDonald; Mike Wolfs	France; Pascal Rambeau; Xavier Rohart
Tornado class	Austria; Roman Hagara; Hans-Peter Steinacher	United States; John Lovell; Charlie Ogeltree	Argentina; Santiago Lange; Carlos Espínola
Yngling class	Great Britain; Shirley Robertson; Sarah Webb; Sarah Ayton	Ukraine; Ruslana Taran; Ganna Kalinina; Svitlana Matevusheva	Denmark; Dorte Jensen; Helle Jespersen; Christina Otzen
49er class	Spain; Iker Martínez; Xabier Fernández	Ukraine; Rodion Luka; George Leonchuk	Great Britain; Chris Draper; Simon Hiscocks

== Shooting ==
=== Men's events ===
Event	Gold	Silver	Bronze
air pistol	Wang Yifu; China	Mikhail Nestruyev; Russia	Vladimir Isakov; Russia
air rifle	Zhu Qinan; China	Li Jie; China	Jozef Gönci; Slovakia
pistol	Mikhail Nestruyev; Russia	Jin Jong-oh; South Korea	Kim Jong-su; North Korea
rifle prone	Matthew Emmons; United States	Christian Lusch; Germany	Sergei Martynov; Belarus
rifle three positions	Jia Zhanbo; China	Michael Anti; United States	Christian Planer; Austria
rapid fire pistol	Ralf Schumann; Germany	Sergei Poliakov; Russia	Sergei Alifirenko; Russia
running target	Manfred Kurzer; Germany	Aleksandr Blinov; Russia	Dimitri Lykin; Russia
Skeet	Andrea Benelli; Italy	Marko Kemppainen; Finland	Juan Miguel Rodríguez; Cuba
Trap	Aleksei Alipov; Russia	Giovanni Pellielo; Italy	Adam Vella; Australia
Double trap	Ahmed Al Maktoum; United Arab Emirates	Rajyavardhan Singh Rathore; India	Wang Zheng; China

=== Women's events ===
Event	Gold	Silver	Bronze
air pistol	Olena Kostevych; Ukraine	Jasna Šekarić; Serbia and Montenegro	Mariya Grozdeva; Bulgaria
air rifle	Du Li; China	Lioubov Galkina; Russia	Kateřina Kůrková; Czech Republic
pistol	Mariya Grozdeva; Bulgaria	Lenka Hyková; Czech Republic	Irada Ashumova; Azerbaijan
rifle three positions	Lioubov Galkina; Russia	Valentina Turisini; Italy	Wang Chengyi; China
Skeet	Diána Igaly; Hungary	Wei Ning; China	Zemfira Meftahatdinova; Azerbaijan
Trap	Suzanne Balogh; Australia	María Quintanal; Spain	Lee Bo-na; South Korea
Double trap	Kim Rhode; United States	Lee Bo-na; South Korea	Gao E China

== Softball ==
Event	Gold	Silver	Bronze
Women's team	United States; Leah Amico; Laura Berg; Crystl Bustos; Lisa Fernandez; Jennie Finch; Tairia Flowers; Amanda Freed; Lori Harrigan; Lovieanne Jung; Kelly Kretschman; Jessica Mendoza; Stacey Nuveman; Cat Osterman; Jenny Topping; Natasha Watley	Australia; Sandra Allen; Marissa Carpadios; Fiona Crawford; Amanda Doman; Peta Edebone; Tanya Harding; Natalie Hodgskin; Simmone Morrow; Tracey Mosley; Stacey Porter; Melanie Roche; Natalie Titcume; Natalie Ward; Brooke Wilkins; Kerry Wyborn	Japan; Emi Inui; Kazue Ito; Yumi Iwabuchi; Masumi Mishina; Emi Naito; Haruka Saito; Hiroko Sakai; Naoko Sakamoto; Rie Sato; Yuki Sato; Juri Takayama; Yukiko Ueno; Reika Utsugi; Eri Yamada; Noriko Yamaji

== Swimming ==
=== Men's events ===
Event	Gold	Silver	Bronze
50 metre freestyle	Gary Hall Jr. United States	Duje Draganja; Croatia	Roland Schoeman; South Africa
100 metre freestyle	Pieter van den Hoogenband; Netherlands	Roland Mark Schoeman; South Africa	Ian Thorpe; Australia
200 metre freestyle	Ian Thorpe; Australia	Pieter van den Hoogenband; Netherlands	Michael Phelps; United States
400 metre freestyle	Ian Thorpe; Australia	Grant Hackett; Australia	Klete Keller; United States
1,500 metre freestyle	Grant Hackett; Australia	Larsen Jensen; United States	David Davies; Great Britain
100 metre backstroke	Aaron Peirsol; United States	Markus Rogan; Austria	Tomomi Morita; Japan
200 metre backstroke	Aaron Peirsol; United States	Markus Rogan; Austria	Răzvan Florea; Romania
100 metre breaststroke	Kosuke Kitajima; Japan	Brendan Hansen; United States	Hugues Duboscq; France
200 metre breaststroke	Kosuke Kitajima; Japan	Dániel Gyurta; Hungary	Brendan Hansen; United States
100 metre butterfly	Michael Phelps; United States	Ian Crocker; United States	Andriy Serdinov; Ukraine
200 metre butterfly	Michael Phelps; United States	Takashi Yamamoto; Japan	Stephen Parry; Great Britain
200 metre individual medley	Michael Phelps; United States	Ryan Lochte; United States	George Bovell; Trinidad and Tobago
400 metre individual medley	Michael Phelps; United States	Erik Vendt; United States	László Cseh; Hungary
4 × 100 metre freestyle relay	South Africa; Roland Schoeman; Lyndon Ferns; Darian Townsend; Ryk Neethling	Netherlands; Johan Kenkhuis; Mitja Zastrow; Klaas-Erik Zwering; Pieter van den Hoogenband; Mark Veens*	United States; Ian Crocker; Michael Phelps; Neil Walker; Jason Lezak; Nate Dusing*; Gary Hall Jr.* Gabe Woodward*
4 × 200 metre freestyle relay	United States; Michael Phelps; Ryan Lochte; Peter Vanderkaay; Klete Keller; Scott Goldblatt*; Dan Ketchum*	Australia; Grant Hackett; Michael Klim; Nicholas Sprenger; Ian Thorpe; Antony Matkovich*; Todd Pearson*; Craig Stevens*	Italy; Emiliano Brembilla; Massimiliano Rosolino; Simone Cercato; Filippo Magnini; Federico Cappellazzo*; Matteo Pelliciari*
4 × 100 metre medley relay	United States; Aaron Peirsol; Brendan Hansen; Ian Crocker; Jason Lezak; Lenny Krayzelburg*; Mark Gangloff*; Michael Phelps*; Neil Walker*	Germany; Steffen Driesen; Jens Kruppa; Thomas Rupprath; Lars Conrad; Helge Meeuw*	Japan; Tomomi Morita; Kosuke Kitajima; Takashi Yamamoto; Yoshihiro Okumura

=== Women's events ===
Event	Gold	Silver	Bronze
50 metre freestyle	Inge de Bruijn; Netherlands	Malia Metella; France	Libby Lenton; Australia
100 metre freestyle	Jodie Henry; Australia	Inge de Bruijn; Netherlands	Natalie Coughlin; United States
200 metre freestyle	Camelia Potec; Romania	Federica Pellegrini; Italy	Solenne Figuès; France
400 metre freestyle	Laure Manaudou; France	Otylia Jędrzejczak; Poland	Kaitlin Sandeno; United States
800 metre freestyle	Ai Shibata; Japan	Laure Manaudou; France	Diana Munz; United States
100 metre backstroke	Natalie Coughlin; United States	Kirsty Coventry; Zimbabwe	Laure Manaudou; France
200 metre backstroke	Kirsty Coventry; Zimbabwe	Stanislava Komarova; Russia	Antje Buschschulte; Germany
200 metre backstroke	Kirsty Coventry; Zimbabwe	Stanislava Komarova; Russia	Reiko Nakamura; Japan
100 metre breaststroke	Luo Xuejuan; China	Brooke Hanson; Australia	Leisel Jones; Australia
200 metre breaststroke	Amanda Beard; United States	Leisel Jones; Australia	Anne Poleska; Germany
100 metre butterfly	Petria Thomas; Australia	Otylia Jędrzejczak; Poland	Inge de Bruijn; Netherlands
200 metre butterfly	Otylia Jędrzejczak; Poland	Petria Thomas; Australia	Yuko Nakanishi; Japan
200 metre individual medley	Yana Klochkova; Ukraine	Amanda Beard; United States	Kirsty Coventry; Zimbabwe
400 metre individual medley	Yana Klochkova; Ukraine	Kaitlin Sandeno; United States	Georgina Bardach; Argentina
4 × 100 metre freestyle relay	Australia; Alice Mills; Libby Lenton; Petria Thomas; Jodie Henry; Sarah Ryan*	United States; Kara Lynn Joyce; Natalie Coughlin; Amanda Weir; Jenny Thompson; Lindsay Benko*; Maritza Correia*; Colleen Lanne*	Netherlands; Chantal Groot; Inge Dekker; Marleen Veldhuis; Inge de Bruijn; Annabel Kosten
4 × 200 metre freestyle relay	United States; Natalie Coughlin; Carly Piper; Dana Vollmer; Kaitlin Sandeno; Lindsay Benko*; Rhi Jeffrey*; Rachel Komisarz*	China; Zhu Yingwen; Xu Yanwei; Yang Yu; Pang Jiaying; Li Ji*	Germany; Franziska van Almsick; Petra Dallmann; Antje Buschschulte; Hannah Stockbauer; Janina Götz*; Sara Harstick*
4 × 100 metre medley relay	Australia; Giaan Rooney; Leisel Jones; Petria Thomas; Jodie Henry; Brooke Hanson*; Alice Mills*; Jessicah Schipper*	United States; Natalie Coughlin; Amanda Beard; Jenny Thompson; Kara Lynn Joyce; Haley Cope*; Tara Kirk*; Rachel Komisarz*; Amanda Weir*	Germany; Antje Buschschulte; Sarah Poewe; Franziska van Almsick; Daniela Götz

* Swimmers who participated in the heats only and received medals.

== Synchronised swimming ==
Event	Gold	Silver	Bronze
duet	Russia; Anastasia Davydova; Anastasia Ermakova	Japan; Miya Tachibana; Miho Takeda	United States; Alison Bartosik; Anna Kozlova
team	Russia; Yelena Azarova; Olga Brusnikina; Anastasia Davydova; Anastasia Ermakova; Elvira Khasyanova; Maria Kisseleva; Olga Novokshchenova; Anna Shorina; Mariya Gromova	Japan; Michiyo Fujimaru; Saho Harada; Kanako Kitao; Emiko Suzuki; Miya Tachibana; Miho Takeda; Juri Tatsumi; Yoko Yoneda	United States; Alison Bartosik; Tamara Crow; Erin Dobratz; Rebecca Jasontek; Anna Kozlova; Sara Lowe; Lauren McFall; Stephanie Nesbitt; Kendra Zanotto

== Table tennis ==
Event	Gold	Silver	Bronze
Men's singles	Ryu Seung-Min; South Korea	Wang Hao; China	Wang Liqin; China
Women's singles	Zhang Yining; China	Kim Hyang-Mi; North Korea	Kim Kyung-Ah; South Korea
Men's doubles	China; Chen Qi; Ma Lin	Hong Kong; Ko Lai Chak; Li Ching	Denmark; Michael Maze; Finn Tugwell
Women's doubles	China; Wang Nan; Zhang Yining	South Korea; Lee Eun-Sil; Seok Eun-Mi	China; Guo Yue; Niu Jianfeng

== Taekwondo ==
Event	Gold	Silver	Bronze
Men's Flyweight (−58 kg)	Chu Mu-Yen; Chinese Taipei	Oscar Salazar; Mexico	Tamer Bayoumi; Egypt
Men's Lightweight (−68 kg)	Hadi Saei; Iran	Huang Chih-hsiung; Chinese Taipei	Song Myeong-Seob; South Korea
Men's Middleweight (−80 kg)	Steven López; United States	Bahri Tanrıkulu; Turkey	Yousef Karami; Iran
Men's Heavyweight (+80 kg)	Moon Dae-Sung; South Korea	Alexandros Nikolaidis; Greece	Pascal Gentil; France
Women's Flyweight (−49 kg)	Chen Shih-Hsin; Chinese Taipei	Yanelis Labrada; Cuba	Yaowapa Boorapolchai; Thailand
Women's Lightweight (−57 kg)	Jang Ji-Won; South Korea	Nia Abdallah; United States	Iridia Salazar; Mexico
Women's Middleweight (−67 kg)	Luo Wei; China	Elisavet Mystakidou; Greece	Hwang Kyung-Sun; South Korea
Women's Heavyweight (+67 kg)	Chen Zhong; China	Myriam Baverel; France	Adriana Carmona; Venezuela

== Tennis ==
Event	Gold	Silver	Bronze
Men's singles	Nicolás Massú; Chile	Mardy Fish; United States	Fernando González; Chile
Women's singles	Justine Henin-Hardenne; Belgium	Amélie Mauresmo; France	Alicia Molik; Australia
Men's doubles	Chile; Fernando González; Nicolás Massú	Germany; Nicolas Kiefer; Rainer Schüttler	Croatia; Mario Ančić; Ivan Ljubičić
Women's doubles	China; Li Ting; Sun Tiantian	Spain; Conchita Martínez; Virginia Ruano Pascual	Argentina; Paola Suárez; Patricia Tarabini

== Triathlon ==
Event	Gold	Silver	Bronze
Men's triathlon	Hamish Carter; New Zealand	Bevan Docherty; New Zealand	Sven Riederer; Switzerland
Women's triathlon	Kate Allen; Austria	Loretta Harrop; Australia	Susan Williams; United States

== Volleyball ==
=== Beach ===
Event	Gold	Silver	Bronze
Men's team	Brazil; Ricardo Santos; Emanuel Rego	Spain; Javier Bosma; Pablo Herrera	Switzerland; Stefan Kobel; Patrick Heuscher
Women's team	United States; Kerri Walsh; Misty May	Brazil; Adriana Behar; Shelda Bede	United States; Holly McPeak; Elaine Youngs

=== Indoor ===
Event	Gold	Silver	Bronze
Men's team	Brazil; Nalbert Bitencourt; Dante Amaral; Sérgio Dutra Santos; Gustavo Endres; Ricardo Garcia; Giovane Gávio; Gilberto de Godoy Filho; André Heller; Maurício Lima; André Nascimento; Anderson Rodrigues; Rodrigo Santana	Italy; Matej Černič; Alberto Cisolla; Paolo Cozzi; Alessandro Fei; Andrea Giani; Luigi Mastrangelo; Samuele Papi; Damiano Pippi; Andrea Sartoretti; Venceslav Simeonov; Paolo Tofoli; Valerio Vermiglio	Russia; Pavel Abramov; Sergei Baranov; Stanislav Dineykin; Aleksey Kazakov; Vadim Khamuttskikh; Taras Khtey; Alexander Kosarev; Alexey Kuleshov; Sergey Tetyukhin; Konstantin Ushakov; Alexey Verbov; Andrey Egorchev
Women's team	China; Feng Kun; Yang Hao; Liu Yanan; Li Shan; Zhou Suhong; Zhao Ruirui; Zhang Yuehong; Chen Jing; Song Nina; Wang Lina; Zhang Na; Zhang Ping	Russia; Irina Tebenikhina; Elena Tyurina; Lioubov Sokolova; Natalya Safronova; Yevgeniya Artamonova; Elizaveta Tishchenko; Olga Chukanova; Yekaterina Gamova; Marina Sheshenina; Alexandra Korukovets; Elena Plotnikova; Olga Nikolaeva	Cuba; Yumilka Ruíz; Nancy Carrillo; Maybelis Martínez; Daimí Ramírez; Yaima Ortíz; Ana Fernández; Liana Mesa; Rosir Calderón; Anniara Muñoz; Dulce Téllez; Marta Sánchez; Zoila Barros

== Water polo ==
Event	Gold	Silver	Bronze
Men's team	Hungary; Tibor Benedek; Péter Biros; Rajmund Fodor; István Gergely; Tamás Kásás; Gergely Kiss; Norbert Madaras; Tamás Molnár; Ádám Steinmetz; Barnabás Steinmetz; Zoltán Szécsi; Tamás Varga; Attila Vári	Serbia and Montenegro; Aleksandar Ćirić; Vladimir Gojković; Danilo Ikodinović; Viktor Jelenić; Predrag Jokić; Nikola Kuljača; Slobodan Nikić; Aleksandar Šapić; Dejan Savić; Denis Šefik; Petar Trbojević; Vanja Udovičić; Vladimir Vujasinović	Russia; Roman Balashov; Revaz Chomakhidze; Alexander Yerishev; Aleksandr Fyodorov; Serguei Garbouzov; Dmitry Gorshkov; Nikolay Kozlov; Nikolai Maximov; Andrei Reketchinski; Dmitri Stratan; Vitaly Yurchik; Marat Zakirov; Irek Zinnurov
Women's team	Italy; Francesca Conti; Martina Miceli; Carmela Allucci; Silvia Bosurgi; Elena Gigli; Manuela Zanchi; Tania di Mario; Cinzia Ragusa; Giusi Malato; Alexandra Araujo; Maddalena Musumeci; Melania Grego; Noémi Tóth	Greece; Georgia Ellinaki; Dimitra Asilian; Antiopi Melidoni; Angeliki Karapataki; Kyriaki Liosi; Stavroula Kozompoli; Aikaterini Oikonomopoulou; Antigoni Roumpesi; Evangelia Moraitidou; Eftychia Karagianni; Georgia Lara; Antonia Moraiti; Anthoula Mylonaki	United States; Jacqueline Frank; Heather Petri; Ericka Lorenz; Brenda Villa; Ellen Estes; Natalie Golda; Margaret Dingeldein; Kelly Rulon; Heather Moody; Robin Beauregard; Amber Stachowski; Nicolle Payne; Thalia Munro

== Weightlifting ==
=== Men's events ===
Event	Gold	Silver	Bronze
Bantamweight (−56 kg)	Halil Mutlu; Turkey	Wu Meijin; China	Sedat Artuç; Turkey
Featherweight (−62 kg)	Shi Zhiyong; China	Le Maosheng; China	Israel José Rubio; Venezuela
Lightweight (−69 kg)	Zhang Guozheng; China	Lee Bae-Young; South Korea	Nikolaj Pešalov; Croatia
Middleweight (−77 kg)	Taner Sağır; Turkey	Sergey Filimonov; Kazakhstan	Reyhan Arabacıoğlu; Turkey
Light heavyweight (−85 kg)	George Asanidze; Georgia	Andrei Rybakou; Belarus	Pyrros Dimas; Greece
Middle heavyweight (−94 kg)	Milen Dobrev; Bulgaria	Khadjimourad Akkaev; Russia	Eduard Tyukin; Russia
Heavyweight (−105 kg)	Dmitry Berestov; Russia	Igor Razoronov; Ukraine	Gleb Pisarevskiy; Russia
Super Heavyweight (+105 kg)	Hossein Rezazadeh; Iran	Viktors Ščerbatihs; Latvia	Velichko Cholakov; Bulgaria

=== Women's events ===
Event	Gold	Silver	Bronze
Flyweight (−48 kg)	Nurcan Taylan; Turkey	Li Zhuo; China	Aree Wiratthaworn; Thailand
Featherweight (−53 kg)	Udomporn Polsak; Thailand	Raema Lisa Rumbewas; Indonesia	Mabel Mosquera; Colombia
Lightweight (−58 kg)	Chen Yanqing; China	Ri Song Hui; North Korea	Wandee Kameaim; Thailand
Middleweight (−63 kg)	Nataliya Skakun; Ukraine	Hanna Batsiushka; Belarus	Tatsiana Stukalava; Belarus
Light heavyweight (−69 kg)	Liu Chunhong; China	Eszter Krutzler; Hungary	Zarema Kasaeva; Russia
Heavyweight (−75 kg)	Pawina Thongsuk; Thailand	Natalya Zabolotnaya; Russia	Valentina Popova; Russia
Super heavyweight (+75 kg)	Tang Gonghong; China	Jang Mi-Ran; South Korea	Agata Wróbel; Poland

== Wrestling ==
=== Freestyle ===
==== Men's ====
Event	Gold	Silver	Bronze
Bantamweight (−55 kg)	Mavlet Batirov; Russia	Stephen Abas; United States	Chikara Tanabe; Japan
Featherweight (−60 kg)	Yandro Quintana; Cuba	Masoud Mostafa-Jokar; Iran	Kenji Inoue; Japan
Lightweight (−66 kg)	Elbrus Tedeyev; Ukraine	Jamill Kelly; United States	Makhach Murtazaliev; Russia
Welterweight (−74 kg)	Buvaisar Saitiev; Russia	Gennadiy Laliyev; Kazakhstan	Iván Fundora; Cuba
Middleweight (−84 kg)	Cael Sanderson; United States	Moon Eui-Jae; South Korea	Sazhid Sazhidov; Russia
Heavyweight (−96 kg)	Khadjimourat Gatsalov; Russia	Magomed Ibragimov; Uzbekistan	Alireza Heidari; Iran
Super heavyweight (−120 kg)	Artur Taymazov; Uzbekistan	Alireza Rezaei; Iran	Aydın Polatçı; Turkey

=== Women's events ===
Event	Gold	Silver	Bronze
Flyweight (−48 kg)	Irina Merleni; Ukraine	Chiharu Icho; Japan	Patricia Miranda; United States
Lightweight (−55 kg)	Saori Yoshida; Japan	Tonya Verbeek; Canada	Anna Gomis; France
Middleweight (−63 kg)	Kaori Icho; Japan	Sara McMann; United States	Lise Legrand; France
Heavyweight (+63 kg)	Wang Xu; China	Gouzel Maniourova; Russia	Kyoko Hamaguchi; Japan

=== Greco-Roman ===
Event	Gold	Silver	Bronze
Bantamweight (−55 kg)	István Majoros; Hungary	Geidar Mamedaliyev; Russia	Artiom Kiouregkian; Greece
Featherweight (−60 kg)	Jung Ji-Hyun; South Korea	Roberto Monzón; Cuba	Armen Nazaryan; Bulgaria
Lightweight (−66 kg)	Farid Mansurov; Azerbaijan	Şeref Eroğlu; Turkey	Mkhitar Manukyan; Kazakhstan
Welterweight (−74 kg)	Aleksandr Dokturishvili; Uzbekistan	Marko Yli-Hannuksela; Finland	Varteres Samurgashev; Russia
Middleweight (−84 kg)	Alexei Mishin; Russia	Ara Abrahamian; Sweden	Viachaslau Makaranka; Belarus
Heavyweight (−96 kg)	Karam Gaber; Egypt	Ramaz Nozadze; Georgia	Mehmet Özal; Turkey
Super heavyweight (−120 kg)	Khasan Baroyev; Russia	Georgiy Tsurtsumia; Kazakhstan	Rulon Gardner; United States

== Leading medal winners ==
27 competitors won at least three medals.

Athlete	Nation	Sport	Gold	Silver	Bronze	Total
Michael Phelps	United States	Swimming	6	0	2	8
Petria Thomas	Australia	Swimming	3	1	0	4
Amanda Beard	United States	Swimming	3	0	0	3
Grant Hackett	Australia	Swimming	3	0	0	3
Paul Hamm	United States	Gymnastics	1	2	0	3
Jodie Henry	Australia	Swimming	3	0	0	3
Otylia Jędrzejczak	Poland	Swimming	3	0	0	3
Carly Patterson	United States	Gymnastics	1	2	0	3
Aaron Peirsol	United States	Swimming	3	0	0	3
Cătălina Ponor	Romania	Gymnastics	3	0	0	3
Pieter van den Hoogenband	Netherlands	Swimming	3	0	0	3
Natalie Coughlin	United States	Swimming	2	2	1	5
Ian Thorpe	Australia	Swimming	2	1	1	4
Veronica Campbell	Jamaica	Athletics	2	0	1	3
Kosuke Kitajima	Japan	Swimming	2	0	1	3
Inge de Bruijn	Netherlands	Swimming	1	1	2	4
Kirsty Coventry	Zimbabwe	Swimming	1	1	1	3
Ian Crocker	United States	Swimming	1	1	1	3
Justin Gatlin	United States	Athletics	1	1	1	3
Brendan Hansen	United States	swimming	1	1	1	3
Leisel Jones	Australia	Swimming	1	1	1	3
Laure Manaudou	France	Swimming	1	1	1	3
Kaitlin Sandeno	United States	Swimming	1	1	1	3
Roland Schoeman	South Africa	Swimming	1	1	1	3
Bradley Wiggins	Great Britain	Cycling	1	1	1	3
Marian Drăgulescu	Romania	Gymnastics	0	1	2	3
Antje Buschschulte	Germany	Swimming	0	0	3	3

== Notes ==
1. Irina Korzhanenko of Russia won the women's shot put event, but her gold medal was revoked after testing positive for stanozolol. The gold, silver and bronze medals were redistributed between the second, third and fourth placed finishers.
2. Hungarian discus thrower Róbert Fazekas originally won the discipline, but after failing to produce enough urine for a drug test, the IOC stripped him of his title and disqualified him from the competition.
3. The IOC stripped Hungarian Adrián Annus of his gold medal when he failed to present himself for a mandatory second drug test five days after winning the hammer throwing event. The medal was reawarded to Koji Murofushi of Japan. The silver medal was given to Belarusian Ivan Tikhon and Turkey's Eşref Apak took the bronze.
4. Cyclist María Luisa Calle finished third in the women's 25 kilometre points race, but the IOC revoked her bronze medal after failing a drug test that detected heptaminol in her system. The medal was given to fourth placed American Erin Mirabella. Calle appealed to the Court of Arbitration for Sport, who on 27 October 2005 upheld her claim that the anti-migraine pill Neo-Saldina she took contained isometheptene, which transforms into heptaminol during laboratory tests. Isometheptene was not banned during the 2004 Summer Olympics. Mirabella relinquished the bronze medal saying, "I still feel like I need some time to absorb everything and get a better understanding of the decision, but if the IOC asks, it's only fair to give the medal back ... I want to do what is right and what is fair."
5. Bettina Hoy of Germany competed in the individual and team eventing disciplines, and earned enough points to win gold medals in both events; however, one hour after she had ridden, the ground jury panel reviewed the results and decided that Hoy had crossed the start line twice. She was docked fourteen points, which dropped her to ninth place in the individual event and her team into fourth place. Hoy appealed, and the committee reversed the penalty, thereby reinstating her gold medals, but the French, and British teams quickly filed a joint complaint of their own with the Court of Arbitration for Sport. Three days later, the CAS overturned the previously successful appeal, stating that the appeals panel did not have the authority to overturn the ground jury's decision. Great Britain's Leslie Law and Pippa Funnell were awarded the gold and bronze medals, respectively, in the individual eventing, and the French team were awarded the gold medal in the team eventing discipline.
6. Cian O'Connor of Ireland at the 2004 Summer Olympics won the gold medal in the men's individual jumping event, but was later stripped of his medal when his horse, Waterford Crystal, tested positive for two banned substances, fluphenazine and zuclophenthixol. It was passed to Brazilian Rodrigo Pessoa, who finished in second place.
7. The German equestrian team jumping squad finished in first place and won gold, ahead of the United States and Swedish teams; however, Ludger Beerbaum's horse, Goldfever, later tested positive for the banned substance betamethasone. Upon being found guilty of riding a drugged horse, the International Equestrian Federation (FIE) recommended to the IOC that the German be stripped of their gold medal. In January 2005, the FIE disqualified Beerbaum and Goldfever, and recalculated the German team's points. The gold medals were given to the United States, Sweden took the silver medals, and Germany were awarded the bronze medals, as the remaining team members still earned enough points to be placed above the Netherlands in fourth position.
8. The Ukrainian women's quadruple sculls crew originally won the bronze medal but were disqualified after Olena Olefirenko tested positive for ethamivan, a banned stimulant found in medicine prescribed by the Ukrainian team doctor. The team's medals were passed to fourth-placed Australia.
9. Leonidas Sampanis of Greece was awarded the bronze medal in the men's featherweight class of weightlifting; however, after testing positive for elevated levels of testosterone, the IOC disqualified him and awarded the bronze to fourth-placed Israel José Rubio from Venezuela. Sampanis' drug test results caused ripples in the philately world, as the day after he appeared on the podium to receive his medal, Hellenic Post began selling commemorative postage stamps which had to be withdrawn when he was disqualified.
10. Hungarian heavyweight weightlifter Ferenc Gyurkovics won the silver medal, but after testing positive for the anabolic steroid oxandrolone, was disqualified and had his medal revoked. It was re-awarded to the Ukraine's Igor Razoronov. Fourth-placed Russian Gleb Pisarevskiy was awarded the bronze medal.
11. Yuriy Bilonog of Ukraine was stripped of his gold medal in December 2012 after a retest of his sample found traces of oxandrolone metabolite, which had been undetected in 2004.
12. Svetlana Krivelyova of Russia was stripped of her bronze medal in December 2012 after a retest of her sample found traces of oxandrolone metabolite, which had been undetected in 2004.
13. Iryna Yatchenko of Belarus was stripped of her bronze medal in December 2012 after a retest of her sample found traces of methandienone metabolite, which had been undetected in 2004.
14. Ivan Tsikhan of Belarus was stripped of his silver medal in December 2012 after a retest of his sample found traces of methandienone metabolite, which had been undetected in 2004.
15. Oleg Perepetchenov of Russia was stripped of his bronze medal in 2012 after a retest of his sample found traces of clenbuterol.

== See also ==
- 2004 Summer Olympics medal table

== Bibliography ==
- Miller, David (2003). Athens to Athens: The Official History of the Olympic Games and the IOC, 1894–2004. Mainstream Publishing. ISBN 1-84018-587-2.
- The Olympic Games: Athens 1894 – Athens 2004. Dorling Kindersley. 2004 [First published 1996]. ISBN 0-7566-0400-1.
- Wallechinsky, David; Loucky, Jaime (2008). The Complete Book of the Olympics. Aurum Press. ISBN 978-1-84513-330-6.
- Official report of the XXVIII Olympiad: Results (PDF). Vol. 2. Athens Organising Committee for the Olympic Games. November 2005. ISBN 960-88101-8-3. Archived from the original (PDF) on 19 August 2008.
