= Romania at the 2004 Summer Olympics =

- IOC code: ROU (ROM used at these Games)
- NOC: Romanian Olympic and Sports Committee
- Website: www.cosr.ro (in Romanian, English, and French)

in Athens
- Competitors: 108 in 16 sports
- Flag bearer: Elisabeta Lipă
- Medals Ranked 14th: Gold 8 Silver 5 Bronze 6 Total 19

Summer Olympics appearances (overview)
- 1900; 1904–1920; 1924; 1928; 1932; 1936; 1948; 1952; 1956; 1960; 1964; 1968; 1972; 1976; 1980; 1984; 1988; 1992; 1996; 2000; 2004; 2008; 2012; 2016; 2020; 2024; 2028

Romania competed at the 2004 Summer Olympics in Athens, Greece, from 13 to 29 August 2004. Romanian athletes have competed at every Summer Olympic Games since its official debut in 1924, missing only two editions, including the 1948 Summer Olympics. The Romanian Olympic and Sports Committee (Romanian: Comitetul Olimpic și Sportiv Român, COSR) sent the nation's smallest team to the Games since the 1988 Summer Olympics in Seoul. A total of 108 athletes, 50 men and 58 women, had competed in 16 different sports, most notably in artistic gymnastics and rowing. For the third time in Olympic history, Romania was again represented by more female than male athletes.

The Romanian team featured several Olympic medalists from Sydney four years earlier, including coxless rowing pair Monica Roşu and Viorica Susanu, sprint canoeists Florin Popescu and Mitică Pricop, gymnastics champion Marius Urzică in men's pommel horse, and rowers Doina Ignat and Georgeta Andrunache. Pistol shooter and 1988 Olympic champion Sorin Babii, and rowing legend Elisabeta Lipă, who won a total of seven Olympic medals in her illustrious sporting career, became the first Romanian athletes to compete in six Olympic Games. Having received the second most medals by a single athlete in the nation's Olympic history, Lipa reprised her role to carry the Romanian flag in the opening ceremony for the second consecutive time.

Despite being the smallest team to the Games since 1988, Romania left Athens with a total of 19 Olympic medals, 8 golds, 5 silver, and 6 bronze, failing only three golds short of the total achieved in Sydney. Most of these medals were awarded to the athletes in artistic gymnastics and rowing, including three prestigious Olympic titles from Cătălina Ponor in women's floor, balance beam, and team all-around exercises. Apart from Ponor's Olympic glory, the nation's highlight of the Games also came with a powerful triumph of the rowing team, as the Romanians managed to secure their title in the women's eight. With a stark tally of eight medals, Lipa greatly emerged as the most successful female rower in the entire Olympic history after winning her fourth consecutive gold and fifth overall within a record span of 20 years.

== Medalists ==
Medal	Name	Sport	Event	Date
Gold	Oana Ban; Alexandra Eremia; Cătălina Ponor; Monica Roşu; Nicoleta Daniela Șofronie; Silvia Stroescu	Gymnastics	Women's artistic team all-around	August 17
Gold	Camelia Potec	Swimming	Women's 200 m freestyle	August 17
Gold	Georgeta Damian; Viorica Susanu	Rowing	Women's pair	August 21
Gold	Angela Alupei; Constanța Burcică	Rowing	Women's lightweight double sculls	August 21
Gold	Monica Roşu	Gymnastics	Women's vault	August 22
Gold	Aurica Bărăscu; Georgeta Damian; Rodica Florea; Liliana Gafencu; Elena Georgescu; Doina Ignat; Elisabeta Lipă; Ioana Papuc; Viorica Susanu	Rowing	Women's eight	August 22
Gold	Cătălina Ponor	Gymnastics	Women's floor	August 23
Gold	Cătălina Ponor	Gymnastics	Women's balance beam	August 23
Silver	Marian Oprea	Athletics	Men's triple jump	August 22
Silver	Marian Drăgulescu	Gymnastics	Men's floor	August 22
Silver	Marius Urzică	Gymnastics	Men's pommel horse	August 22
Silver	Nicoleta Daniela Șofronie	Gymnastics	Women's floor	August 23
Silver	Ionela Târlea-Manolache	Athletics	Women's 400 m hurdles	August 25
Bronze	Marian Drăgulescu; Ilie Daniel Popescu; Dan Nicolae Potra; Răzvan Dorin Șelariu; Ioan Silviu Suciu; Marius Urzică	Gymnastics	Men's artistic team all-around	August 16
Bronze	Răzvan Florea	Swimming	Men's 200 m backstroke	August 19
Bronze	Marian Drăgulescu	Gymnastics	Men's vault	August 23
Bronze	Alexandra Eremia	Gymnastics	Women's balance beam	August 23
Bronze	Maria Cioncan	Athletics	Women's 1500 m	August 28
Bronze	Ionuț Gheorghe	Boxing	Light welterweight	August 28

Medals by sport
Sport	1st place, gold medalist(s)	2nd place, silver medalist(s)	3rd place, bronze medalist(s)	Total
Athletics	0	2	1	3
Boxing	0	0	1	1
Gymnastics	4	3	3	10
Rowing	3	0	0	3
Swimming	1	0	1	2
Total	8	5	6	19

Medals by gender
Gender	1st place, gold medalist(s)	2nd place, silver medalist(s)	3rd place, bronze medalist(s)	Total
Male	0	3	4	7
Female	8	2	2	12
Total	8	5	6	19

== Athletics ==
Romanian athletes have so far achieved qualifying standards in the following athletics events (up to a maximum of 3 athletes in each event at the 'A' Standard, and 1 at the 'B' Standard).

Key

- Note – Ranks given for track events are within the athlete's heat only
- Q = Qualified for the next round
- q = Qualified for the next round as a fastest loser or, in field events, by position without achieving the qualifying target
- NR = National record
- N/A = Round not applicable for the event
- Bye = Athlete not required to compete in round

Men
Field events

Athlete	Event	Qualification		Final	
Athlete	Event	Distance	Position	Distance	Position
Gheorghe Gușet	Shot put	19.68	14	Did not advance	
Marian Oprea	Triple jump	17.44	3 Q	17.55	2nd place, silver medalist(s)
Bogdan Țăruș	Long jump	8.08	8 q	8.21	8
Ștefan Vasilache	High jump	2.25	=15	Did not advance	

Women
Track & road events

Athlete	Event	Heat		Semifinal		Final	
Athlete	Event	Result	Rank	Result	Rank	Result	Rank
Mihaela Botezan	10000 m	—N/a				31:11.24 NR	11
Norica Câmpean	20 km walk	—N/a				1:34:30	27
Daniela Cârlan	20 km walk	—N/a				1:37:14	37
Maria Cioncan	800 m	1:59.64	1 Q	1:59.44	2 Q	1:59.62	7
Maria Cioncan	1500 m	4:06.68	1 Q	4:06.69	1 Q	3:58.39	3rd place, bronze medalist(s)
Alina Cucerzan	1500 m	4:18.07	13	Did not advance			
Constantina Diță	Marathon	—N/a				2:37:31	20
Ana Maria Groza	20 km walk	—N/a				1:34:56	29
Elena Iagăr	1500 m	4:11.48	11	Did not advance			
Nuța Olaru	Marathon	—N/a				2:34:45	13
Lidia Șimon	Marathon	—N/a				DNF	
Ionela Târlea-Manolache	400 m hurdles	54.41	1 Q	53.32	2 Q	53.38	2nd place, silver medalist(s)
Angela Moroșanu; Alina Răpanu; Maria Rus; Ionela Târlea-Manolache	4 × 400 m relay	3:27.36	5 q	—N/a		3:26.81	6

Field events

Athlete	Event	Qualification		Final	
Athlete	Event	Distance	Position	Distance	Position
Adina Anton	Long jump	6.47	18	Did not advance	
Adelina Gavrilă	Triple jump	14.56	=11 Q	13.86	15
Nicoleta Grasu	Discus throw	61.91	8 q	64.92	6
Monica Iagăr	High jump	1.95	=8 Q	1.93	8
Alina Militaru	Long jump	NM	—	Did not advance	
Oana Pantelimon	High jump	1.92	12 q	1.93	7
Mariana Solomon	Triple jump	14.42	16	Did not advance	
Felicia Țilea-Moldovan	Javelin throw	62.05	7 Q	59.72	11

== Boxing ==
Romania sent three boxers to Athens. None lost in the round of 32, as two won and the third had a bye. In the round of 16, though, one boxer was defeated. Another fell in the quarterfinal. The third survived to the semifinal, where he was defeated to finish with a bronze medal. That medal put Romania in a five-way tie for 16th place in the boxing medal count.

Athlete	Event	Round of 32	Round of 16	Quarterfinals	Semifinals	Final	
Athlete	Event	Opposition Result	Opposition Result	Opposition Result	Opposition Result	Opposition Result	Rank
Viorel Simion	Featherweight	Langham (AUS); W 40–15	Biarnadski (BLR); W 38–13	Jo S-H (KOR); L 35–39	Did not advance		
Ionuț Gheorghe	Light welterweight	Karim (PAK); W 26–11	Karagöllü (TUR); W 28–19	di Rocco (ITA); W 29–18	Boonjumnong (THA); L 9–30	Did not advance	3rd place, bronze medalist(s)
Marian Simion	Middleweight	Bye	Yasser (EGY); L 29–36	Did not advance			

== Canoeing ==
=== Sprint ===
Men

Athlete	Event	Heats		Semifinals		Final	
Athlete	Event	Time	Rank	Time	Rank	Time	Rank
Florin Mironcic	C-1 500 m	1:51.568	3 q	1:53.957	8	Did not advance	
Mitică Pricop	C-1 1000 m	4:00.559	4 q	3:59.640	5	Did not advance	
Marian Baban; Ștefan Vasile	K-2 500 m	1:34.410	6 q	1:34.398	7	Did not advance	
Florin Popescu; Silviu Simioncencu	C-2 500 m	1:41.368	4 q	1:41.424	1 Q	1:40.618	4
Florin Popescu; Silviu Simioncencu	C-2 1000 m	3:30.419	1 Q	Bye		3:43.858	4
Marian Baban; Alexandru Ceauşu; Vasile Curuzan; Ștefan Vasile	K-4 1000 m	2:55.324	4 q	2:53.994	1 Q	3:03.107	7

Women

Athlete	Event	Heats		Semifinals		Final	
Athlete	Event	Time	Rank	Time	Rank	Time	Rank
Lidia Talpă; Florica Vulpeș	K-2 500 m	1:45.386	7 q	1:45.770	5	Did not advance	

Qualification Legend: Q = Qualify to final; q = Qualify to semifinal

== Cycling ==
=== Mountain biking ===
Athlete	Event	Time	Rank
Ovidiu Tudor Oprea	Men's cross-country	LAP (1 lap)	37

== Diving ==
Women

Athlete	Event	Preliminaries		Semifinals		Final	
Athlete	Event	Points	Rank	Points	Rank	Points	Rank
Ramona Maria Ciobanu	10 m platform	268.23	24	Did not advance			

== Equestrian ==
=== Eventing ===
Athlete	Horse	Event	Dressage		Cross-country			Jumping						Total	
Athlete	Horse	Event	Dressage		Cross-country			Qualifier			Final			Total	
Athlete	Horse	Event	Penalties	Rank	Penalties	Total	Rank	Penalties	Total	Rank	Penalties	Total	Rank	Penalties	Rank
Viorel Bubău	Carnaval	Individual	80.00	75	Eliminated			Did not advance							

== Fencing ==
Six Romanian fencers (two men and four women) qualified for the following events.

Men

Athlete	Event	Round of 64	Round of 32	Round of 16	Quarterfinal	Semifinal	Final / BM	
Athlete	Event	Opposition Score	Opposition Score	Opposition Score	Opposition Score	Opposition Score	Opposition Score	Rank
Alexandru Nyisztor	Individual épée	Nikishyn (UKR); W 15–6	Rota (ITA); L 8–15	Did not advance				
Mihai Covaliu	Individual sabre	Bye	Zhou Hm (CHN); W 15–10	Sznajder (UKR); W 15–9	Nemcsik (HUN); L 14–15	Did not advance		

Women

Athlete	Event	Round of 64	Round of 32	Round of 16	Quarterfinal	Semifinal	Final / BM	
Athlete	Event	Opposition Score	Opposition Score	Opposition Score	Opposition Score	Opposition Score	Opposition Score	Rank
Ana Maria Brânză	Individual épée	Gamir (ALG); W 15–14	Hormay (HUN); W 15–13	Zhang L (CHN); L 13–15	Did not advance			
Laura Badea-Cârlescu	Individual foil	—N/a	Bye	Meng J (CHN); W 15–11	Gruchała (POL); L 7–15	Did not advance		
Roxana Scarlat	Individual foil	—N/a	Bye	Nam H-H (KOR); L 7–15	Did not advance			
Cătălina Gheorghițoaia	Individual sabre	—N/a	Toure (SEN); W 15–6	Socha (POL); W 15–12	Zhang Y (CHN); W 15–13	Zagunis (USA); L 7–15	Jacobson (USA); L 7–15	4

== Gymnastics ==
=== Artistic ===
Men
Team

Athlete	Event	Qualification								Final							
Athlete	Event	Apparatus						Total	Rank	Apparatus						Total	Rank
Athlete	Event	F	PH	R	V	PB	HB	Total	Rank	F	PH	R	V	PB	HB	Total	Rank
Marian Drăgulescu	Team	9.762 Q	9.325	9.475	9.762 Q	9.562	9.550	57.436	4 Q	9.562	—N/a		9.825	9.200	—N/a		
Ilie Daniel Popescu	Team	—N/a	9.625	9.562	—N/a					—N/a	9.687	9.650	—N/a				
Dan Nicolae Potra	Team	9.537	9.300	9.500	9.362	9.550	8.500	55.749	25	—N/a		9.587	—N/a	9.537	—N/a		
Răzvan Dorin Șelariu	Team	9.625	—N/a	9.700	9.500	9.150	9.512	—N/a		9.475	—N/a	9.725	9.525	—N/a	8.912	—N/a	
Ioan Silviu Suciu	Team	9.650	9.712	9.487	9.637	9.500	9.412	57.398	6 Q	9.687	9.737	—N/a	9.675	—N/a	9.275	—N/a	
Marius Urzică	Team	—N/a	9.812 Q	—N/a		9.700	9.675	—N/a		—N/a	9.825	—N/a		9.725	9.775	—N/a	
Total	Team	38.574	38.474	38.249	38.261	38.312	38.149	230.019	3 Q	28.724	29.249	28.962	29.025	28.462	27.962	172.384	3rd place, bronze medalist(s)

Individual finals

Athlete	Event	Apparatus						Total	Rank
Athlete	Event	F	PH	R	V	PB	HB	Total	Rank
Marian Drăgulescu	All-around	9.612	9.525	9.562	9.850	9.437	9.337	57.323	8
Marian Drăgulescu	Floor	9.787	—N/a					9.787	2nd place, silver medalist(s)
Marian Drăgulescu	Vault	—N/a			9.612	—N/a		9.612	3rd place, bronze medalist(s)
Ioan Silviu Suciu	All-around	9.650	9.737	9.550	9.737	9.312	9.662	57.648	4
Marius Urzică	Pommel horse	—N/a	9.825	—N/a				9.825	2nd place, silver medalist(s)

Women
Team

Athlete	Event	Qualification						Final					
Athlete	Event	Apparatus				Total	Rank	Apparatus				Total	Rank
Athlete	Event	V	UB	BB	F	Total	Rank	V	UB	BB	F	Total	Rank
Oana Ban	Team	9.325	9.425	9.625	9.600	37.975	3 Q*	—N/a	9.187	9.512	9.437	—N/a	
Alexandra Eremia	Team	—N/a	9.287	9.687 Q	9.150	—N/a		—N/a		9.687	—N/a		
Cătălina Ponor	Team	9.500	—N/a	9.775 Q	9.687 Q	—N/a		9.412	—N/a	9.762	9.750	—N/a	
Monica Roșu	Team	9.675 Q	9.375	—N/a	9.350	—N/a		9.625	9.387	—N/a			
Nicoleta Daniela Șofronie	Team	9.425	9.625 Q	9.487	9.525 Q	38.062	2 Q	9.400	9.562	—N/a	9.562	—N/a	
Silvia Stroescu	Team	9.225	9.325	9.512	—N/a	—N/a		Did not compete					
Total	Team	37.925	37.750	38.599	38.162	152.436	1 Q	28.437	28.136	28.961	28.749	114.283	1st place, gold medalist(s)

* Oana Ban qualified for the individual all-around, but later withdrew from the final because of her injuries sustained in the team all-around final.

Individual finals

Athlete	Event	Apparatus				Total	Rank
Athlete	Event	V	UB	BB	F	Total	Rank
Alexandra Eremia	Balance beam	—N/a		9.700	—N/a	9.700	3rd place, bronze medalist(s)
Cătălina Ponor	Floor	—N/a			9.750	9.750	1st place, gold medalist(s)
Cătălina Ponor	Balance beam	—N/a		9.787	—N/a	9.787	1st place, gold medalist(s)
Monica Roșu	Vault	9.656	—N/a			9.656	1st place, gold medalist(s)
Nicoleta Daniela Șofronie	All-around	9.412	9.637	9.362	9.537	37.948	5
Nicoleta Daniela Șofronie	Floor	—N/a			9.562	9.562	2nd place, silver medalist(s)
Nicoleta Daniela Șofronie	Uneven bars	—N/a	9.462	—N/a		9.462	6

== Judo ==
Four Romanian judoka (two men and two women) qualified for the 2004 Summer Olympics.

Men

Athlete	Event	Round of 32	Round of 16	Quarterfinals	Semifinals	Repechage 1	Repechage 2	Repechage 3	Final / BM	
Athlete	Event	Opposition Result	Opposition Result	Opposition Result	Opposition Result	Opposition Result	Opposition Result	Opposition Result	Opposition Result	Rank
Claudiu Baștea	−73 kg	Mariko (MLI); W 0210–0000	Neto (POR); L 0001–1020	Did not advance						
Gabriel Munteanu	+100 kg	Tmenov (RUS); L 0000–1110	Did not advance			Hernandes (BRA); L 0000–1000	Did not advance			

Women

Athlete	Event	Round of 32	Round of 16	Quarterfinals	Semifinals	Repechage 1	Repechage 2	Repechage 3	Final / BM	
Athlete	Event	Opposition Result	Opposition Result	Opposition Result	Opposition Result	Opposition Result	Opposition Result	Opposition Result	Opposition Result	Rank
Alina Dumitru	−48 kg	Bye	Shishkina (KAZ); W 0012–0011	Żemła-Krajewska (POL); W 1000–0000	Tani (JPN); L 0001–0211	Bye			Gao F (CHN); L 0110–1010	5
Ioana Maria Aluaş	−52 kg	Stormont (NZL); W 1010–0000	Euranie (FRA); L 0030–0111	Did not advance		Bye	Monteiro (POR); W 1000–0000	Souakri (ALG); L 0100–0121	Did not advance	

== Rowing ==
Romanian rowers qualified the following boats:

Men

Athlete	Event	Heats		Repechage		Semifinals		Final	
Athlete	Event	Time	Rank	Time	Rank	Time	Rank	Time	Rank
Florin Corbeanu; Ovidiu Cornea; Daniel Măstăcan; Gheorghiţa Munteanu	Four	6:40.16	5 R	6:00.10	4	Did not advance			

Women

Athlete	Event	Heats		Repechage		Semifinals		Final	
Athlete	Event	Time	Rank	Time	Rank	Time	Rank	Time	Rank
Georgeta Damian; Viorica Susanu	Pair	7:29.74	1 FA	Bye		—N/a		7:06.56	1st place, gold medalist(s)
Camelia Macoviciuc-Mihalcea; Simona Muşat	Double sculls	7:39.32	3 R	6:58.00	2 FA	—N/a		7:17.58	5
Angela Alupei; Constanța Burcică	Lightweight double sculls	6:50.64	1 SA/B	Bye		6:51.84	1 FA	6:56.05	1st place, gold medalist(s)
Aurica Bărăscu; Georgeta Damian; Rodica Florea; Liliana Gafencu; Elena Georgescu; Doina Ignat; Elisabeta Lipă; Ioana Papuc; Viorica Susanu (cox)	Eight	6:03.99	1 FA	Bye		—N/a		6:17.70	1st place, gold medalist(s)

Qualification Legend: FA=Final A (medal); FB=Final B (non-medal); FC=Final C (non-medal); FD=Final D (non-medal); FE=Final E (non-medal); FF=Final F (non-medal); SA/B=Semifinals A/B; SC/D=Semifinals C/D; SE/F=Semifinals E/F; R=Repechage

== Shooting ==
Two Romanian shooters qualified to compete in the following events:

Men

Athlete	Event	Qualification		Final	
Athlete	Event	Points	Rank	Points	Rank
Sorin Babii	10 m air pistol	579	=13	Did not advance	
Sorin Babii	50 m pistol	553	=18	Did not advance	
Iulian Raicea	10 m air pistol	570	39	Did not advance	
Iulian Raicea	25 m rapid fire pistol	588	4 Q	687.6	5

== Swimming ==
Romanian swimmers earned qualifying standards in the following events (up to a maximum of 2 swimmers in each event at the A-standard time, and 1 at the B-standard time):

Men

Athlete	Event	Heat		Semifinal		Final	
Athlete	Event	Time	Rank	Time	Rank	Time	Rank
Dragoș Coman	400 m freestyle	3:51.73	16	—N/a		Did not advance	
Dragoș Coman	1500 m freestyle	15:06.33 NR	6 Q	—N/a		15:10.21	7
Răzvan Florea	100 m backstroke	55.77	=14 Q	55.27	10	Did not advance	
Răzvan Florea	200 m backstroke	1:58.81	4 Q	1:58.20	4 Q	1:57.56	3rd place, bronze medalist(s)
Ioan Gherghel	100 m butterfly	53.89	27	Did not advance			
Ioan Gherghel	200 m butterfly	1:58.12	=7 Q	1:57.31	6 Q	1:56.10	5

Women

Athlete	Event	Heat		Semifinal		Final	
Athlete	Event	Time	Rank	Time	Rank	Time	Rank
Beatrice Câșlaru	200 m individual medley	2:14.70	6 Q	2:14.25	6 Q	2:15.40	8
Beatrice Câșlaru	400 m individual medley	4:46.94	14	—N/a		Did not advance	
Larisa Lăcustă	200 m freestyle	2:06.62	38	Did not advance			
Simona Păduraru	400 m freestyle	4:10.39	11	—N/a		Did not advance	
Simona Păduraru	800 m freestyle	8:34.15	8 Q	—N/a		8:37.02	8
Camelia Potec	200 m freestyle	2:00.50	11 Q	1:59.25	7 Q	1:58.03 NR	1st place, gold medalist(s)
Camelia Potec	400 m freestyle	4:07.39	3 Q	—N/a		4:06.34	4
Camelia Potec	800 m freestyle	8:41.20	16	—N/a		Did not advance	
Beatrice Câșlaru; Larisa Lăcustă; Simona Păduraru; Camelia Potec	4 × 200 m freestyle relay	8:09.67	11	—N/a		Did not advance	

== Table tennis ==
Four Romanian table tennis players qualified for the following events.

Athlete	Event	Round 1	Round 2	Round 3	Round 4	Quarterfinals	Semifinals	Final / BM	
Athlete	Event	Opposition Result	Opposition Result	Opposition Result	Opposition Result	Opposition Result	Opposition Result	Opposition Result	Rank
Adrian Crişan	Men's singles	Bye	Lupulesku (USA); W 4–0	Chiang P-L (TPE); L 1–4	Did not advance				
Otilia Bădescu	Women's singles	Bye	Kravchenko (ISR); L 2–4	Did not advance					
Mihaela Steff	Women's singles	Bye		Kim H-M (PRK); L 2–4	Did not advance				
Adriana Zamfir	Women's singles	Bye	Shaban (JOR); W 4–1	Lin L (HKG); W 4–2	Wang N (CHN); L 1–4	Did not advance			
Mihaela Steff; Adriana Zamfir	Women's doubles	Bye		Tan P F / Zhang Xl (SIN); L 1–4	Did not advance				

== Tennis ==
Romania nominated two male tennis players to compete in the tournament.

Athlete	Event	Round of 64	Round of 32	Round of 16	Quarterfinals	Semifinals	Final / BM	
Athlete	Event	Opposition Score	Opposition Score	Opposition Score	Opposition Score	Opposition Score	Opposition Score	Rank
Victor Hănescu	Men's singles	Arthurs (AUS); L 4–6, 6–7^{(4–7)}	Did not advance					
Andrei Pavel	Men's singles	Karlović (CRO); L 4–6, 7–6^{(12–10)}, 2–6	Did not advance					
Victor Hănescu; Andrei Pavel	Men's doubles	—N/a	Kiefer / Schüttler (GER); L 5–7, 6–7^{(3–7)}	Did not advance				

== Weightlifting ==
Seven Romanian weightlifters qualified for the following events:

Men

Athlete	Event	Snatch		Clean & Jerk		Total	Rank
Athlete	Event	Result	Rank	Result	Rank	Total	Rank
Adrian Jigău	−56 kg	120	=7	155	=3	275	6
Ioan Veliciu	−62 kg	110	16	135	14	245	14
Stănel Stoica	−69 kg	142.5	=8	160	=10	302.5	9
Sebastian Dogariu	−77 kg	155	=11	190	11	345	11
Vasile Hegheduș	−77 kg	~~150~~	DNF	—	—	—	DNF
Valeriu Calancea	−85 kg	160	=10	—	—	—	DNF

Women

Athlete	Event	Snatch		Clean & Jerk		Total	Rank
Athlete	Event	Result	Rank	Result	Rank	Total	Rank
Marioara Munteanu	−53 kg	85	6	105	5	190	4

== Wrestling ==
Key

- VT – Victory by Fall.
- PP – Decision by Points – the loser with technical points.
- PO – Decision by Points – the loser without technical points.

Men's freestyle

Athlete	Event	Elimination Pool				Quarterfinal	Semifinal	Final / BM	
Athlete	Event	Opposition Result	Opposition Result	Opposition Result	Rank	Opposition Result	Opposition Result	Opposition Result	Rank
Nicolae Ghiţă	−84 kg	Aliev (TJK); L 1–3 ^{PP}	Sazhidov (RUS); L 0–5 ^{VT}	Sène (SEN); W 3–1 ^{PP}	3	Did not advance			9
Rareș Chintoan	−120 kg	Thiele (GER); L 0–3 ^{PO}	Polatçı (TUR); L 0–4 ^{ST}	—N/a	3	Did not advance			19

Men's Greco-Roman

Athlete	Event	Elimination Pool			Quarterfinal	Semifinal	Final / BM	
Athlete	Event	Opposition Result	Opposition Result	Rank	Opposition Result	Opposition Result	Opposition Result	Rank
Marian Sandu	−55 kg	Tengizbayev (KAZ); W 3–0 ^{PO}	Im D-W (KOR); L 1–3 ^{PP}	2	Did not advance			11
Eusebiu Diaconu	−60 kg	Passos (POR); W 4–0 ^{ST}	Gruenwald (USA); W 3–1 ^{PP}	1 Q	Jung J-H (KOR); L 0–3 ^{PO}	Did not advance		6
Petru Sudureac	−96 kg	Hashemzadeh (IRI); L 1–3 ^{PP}	Ežerskis (LTU); L 1–3 ^{PP}	3	Did not advance			15

== See also ==
- Romania at the 2004 Summer Paralympics
