= Rowing at the 2004 Summer Olympics – Women's eight =

Women's eight at the Games of the XXVIII Olympiad

Medalists
1st place, gold medalist(s)		Rodica Florea; Viorica Susanu; Aurica Bărăscu; Ioana Papuc; Liliana Gafencu; Elisabeta Lipă; Georgeta Damian; Doina Ignat; Elena Georgescu	Romania
2nd place, silver medalist(s)		Kate Johnson; Samantha Magee; Megan Dirkmaat; Alison Cox; Caryn Davies; Laurel Korholz; Anna Mickelson; Lianne Nelson; Mary Whipple	United States
3rd place, bronze medalist(s)		Froukje Wegman; Marlies Smulders; Nienke Hommes; Hurnet Dekkers; Annemarieke van Rumpt; Annemiek de Haan; Sarah Siegelaar; Helen Tanger; Ester Workel	Netherlands

These are the results of the Women's eight competition, one of six events for female competitors in Rowing at the 2004 Summer Olympics in Athens.

== Women's eight ==
Gold:	Silver:	Bronze:
Romania; Rodica Florea; Viorica Susanu; Aurica Bărăscu; Ioana Papuc; Liliana Gafencu; Elisabeta Lipă; Georgeta Damian; Doina Ignat; Elena Georgescu (cox)	United States; Kate Johnson; Samantha Magee; Megan Dirkmaat; Alison Cox; Caryn Davies; Laurel Korholz; Anna Mickelson; Lianne Nelson; Mary Whipple (cox)	Netherlands; Froukje Wegman; Marlies Smulders, Nienke Hommes; Hurnet Dekkers; Annemarieke van Rumpt; Annemiek de Haan; Sarah Siegelaar; Helen Tanger; Ester Workel (cox)

=== Heats – 15 August ===
Heat 1

1. United States: Kate Johnson, Samantha Magee, Megan Dirkmaat, Alison Cox, Caryn Davies, Laurel Korholz, Anna Mickelson, Lianne Nelson, Mary Whipple (coxswain) 5:56.55 OB, WB -> Final A
2. Romania: Rodica Florea, Viorica Susanu, Aurica Bărăscu, Ioana Papuc, Liliana Gafencu, Elisabeta Lipă, Georgeta Damian, Doina Ignat, Elena Georgescu (coxswain) 5:56.77 -> Repechage
3. Germany Elke Hipler, Britta Holthaus, Maja Tucholke, Anja Pyritz, Susanne Schmidt, Nicole Zimmermann, Silke Günther, Lenka Wech, Annina Ruppel (coxswain) 5:59.75 -> Repechage
4. Australia: Sarah Outhwaite, Jodi Winter, Catriona Oliver, Monique Heinke, Julia Wilson, Sally Robbins, Vicky Roberts, Kyeema Doyle, Katie Foulkes (coxswain) 6:02.77 -> Repechage

Heat 2

1. Netherlands: Froukje Wegman, Marlies Smulders, Nienke Hommes, Hurnet Dekkers, Annemarieke van Rumpt, Annemiek de Haan, Sarah Siegelaar, Helen Tanger, Ester Workel (coxswain) 6:04.10 -> Final A
2. China: Yu Fei, Luo Xiuhua, Cheng Ran, Yan Xiaoxia, Wu You, Yang Cuiping, Gao Yanhua, Jin Ziwei, Zheng Na (coxswain) 6:06.20 -> Repechage
3. Canada: Anna-Marie de Zwager, Pauline van Roessel, Jacqui Cook, Andréanne Morin, Roslyn McLeod, Karen Clark, Romina Stefancic, Sabrina Kolker, Sarah Pape (coxswain) 6:12.40 -> Repechage

=== Repechage ===
18 August
Repechage 1

1. Romania: Rodica Florea, Viorica Susanu, Aurica Bărăscu, Ioana Papuc, Liliana Gafencu, Elisabeta Lipă, Georgeta Damian, Doina Ignat, Elena Georgescu (coxswain) 6:03.99 -> Final A
2. Germany: Elke Hipler, Britta Holthaus, Maja Tucholke, Anja Pyritz, Susanne Schmidt, Nicole Zimmermann, Silke Günther, Lenka Wech, Annina Ruppel (coxswain) 6:06.86 -> Final A
3. Australia: Sarah Outhwaite, Jodi Winter, Catriona Oliver, Monique Heinke, Julia Wilson, Sally Robbins, Vicky Roberts, Kyeema Doyle, Katie Foulkes (coxswain) 6:09.64 -> Final A
4. China: Yu Fei, Luo Xiuhua, Cheng Ran, Yan Xiaoxia, Wu You, Yang Cuiping, Gao Yanhua, Jin Ziwei, Zheng Na (coxswain) 6:09.87 -> Final A
5. Canada: Anna-Marie de Zwager, Pauline van Roessel, Jacqui Cook, Andréanne Morin, Roslyn McLeod, Karen Clark, Romina Stefancic, Sabrina Kolker, Sarah Pape (coxswain) 6:15.18

== Final – 22 August ==
Rank	Rowers	Country	Time
Gold medal	Rodica Florea, Viorica Susanu, Aurica Bărăscu, Ioana Papuc, Liliana Gafencu, Elisabeta Lipă, Georgeta Damian, Doina Ignat, Elena Georgescu (coxswain)	Romania	6:17.70
Silver medal	Kate Johnson, Samantha Magee, Megan Dirkmaat, Alison Cox, Caryn Davies, Laurel Korholz, Anna Mickelson, Lianne Nelson, Mary Whipple (coxswain)	United States	6:19.56
Bronze medal	Froukje Wegman, Marlies Smulders, Nienke Hommes, Hurnet Dekkers, Annemarieke van Rumpt, Annemiek de Haan, Sarah Siegelaar, Helen Tanger, Ester Workel (coxswain)	Netherlands	6:19.85
4	Yu Fei, Luo Xiuhua, Cheng Ran, Yan Xiaoxia, Wu You, Yang Cuiping, Gao Yanhua, Jin Ziwei, Zheng Na (coxswain)	China	6:21.71
5	Elke Hipler, Britta Holthaus, Maja Tucholke, Anja Pyritz, Susanne Schmidt, Nicole Zimmermann, Silke Günther, Lenka Wech, Annina Ruppel (coxswain)	Germany	6:21.99
6	Sarah Outhwaite, Jodi Winter, Catriona Oliver, Monique Heinke, Julia Wilson, Sally Robbins, Vicky Roberts, Kyeema Doyle, Katie Foulkes (coxswain)	Australia	6:31.65
