= Rowing at the 2006 Asian Games – Women's coxless four =

Women's coxless four at the 2006 Asian Games
- Venue: West Bay Lagoon
- Date: 3–6 December 2006
- Competitors: 32 from 8 nations

Medalists
gold medal	China; Cheng Ran, Yu Chengxi, Gao Yanhua, Mu Suli
silver medal	North Korea; Kang Kum-sun, Kim Ok-bun, Kim Ryon-ok, Yu Sun-ok
bronze medal	South Korea; Kim Soon-rye, Im Eun-seon, Eom Mi-seon, Min Su-hyoun

The women's coxless four competition at the 2006 Asian Games in Doha was held from 3 December to 6 December at the West Bay Lagoon.

Since Doha was scarce of water the distance had to be shortened from standard 2000 meters to 1000 meters.

== Schedule ==
All times are Arabia Standard Time (UTC+03:00)

Date	Time	Event
Sunday, 3 December 2006	15:10	Heats
Monday, 4 December 2006	14:50	Repechage
Tuesday, 5 December 2006	15:00	Semifinals
Wednesday, 6 December 2006	11:00	Finals

== Results ==
Legend

- DNS — Did not start

=== Heats ===
- Qualification: 1–2 → Semifinal A/B (SA/B), 3–4 → Repechage (R)

==== Heat 1 ====
Rank	Team	Time	Notes
1	China (CHN); Cheng Ran; Yu Chengxi; Gao Yanhua; Mu Suli	4:23.04	SA/B
2	South Korea (KOR); Kim Soon-rye; Im Eun-seon; Eom Mi-seon; Min Su-hyoun	4:34.18	SA/B
3	Vietnam (VIE); Cao Thị Tuyết; Đặng Thị Thắm; Trần Thị Sâm; Mai Thị Dung	4:46.00	R
4	Iran (IRI); Mina Amini; Sahra Zolghadr; Minoo Zargari; Saba Shayesteh	5:50.60	R

==== Heat 2 ====
Rank	Team	Time	Notes
1	North Korea (PRK); Kang Kum-sun; Kim Ok-bun; Kim Ryon-ok; Yu Sun-ok	4:37.56	SA/B
2	India (IND); Munshadi Khatun; Mamata Jena; Swathy Sanjay; Pravasini Dwibedy	4:43.29	SA/B
3	Kazakhstan (KAZ); Inga Dudchenko; Tatyana Feklistova; Svetlana Germanovich; Mariya Filimonova	4:45.13	R
4	Chinese Taipei (TPE); Tsai Chia-ying; Hsieh Li-chun; Lin Pei-yin; Yu Chen-chun	4:49.12	R

=== Repechage ===
- Qualification: 1–2 → Semifinal A/B (SA/B), 3–4 → Final B (FB)

Rank	Team	Time	Notes
1	Chinese Taipei (TPE); Tsai Chia-ying; Hsieh Li-chun; Lin Pei-yin; Yu Chen-chun	4:02.49	SA/B
2	Vietnam (VIE); Cao Thị Tuyết; Đặng Thị Thắm; Trần Thị Sâm; Mai Thị Dung	4:02.99	SA/B
3	Kazakhstan (KAZ); Inga Dudchenko; Tatyana Feklistova; Svetlana Germanovich; Mariya Filimonova	4:04.59	FB
4	Iran (IRI); Mina Amini; Sahra Zolghadr; Minoo Zargari; Saba Shayesteh	5:01.56	FB

=== Semifinals ===
- Qualification: 1–2 → Final A (FA), 3 → Final B (FB)

==== Semifinal A/B 1 ====
Rank	Team	Time	Notes
1	China (CHN); Cheng Ran; Yu Chengxi; Gao Yanhua; Mu Suli	3:40.06	FA
2	Vietnam (VIE); Cao Thị Tuyết; Đặng Thị Thắm; Trần Thị Sâm; Mai Thị Dung	3:54.22	FA
3	India (IND); Munshadi Khatun; Mamata Jena; Swathy Sanjay; Pravasini Dwibedy	4:02.93	FB

==== Semifinal A/B 2 ====
Rank	Team	Time	Notes
1	South Korea (KOR); Kim Soon-rye; Im Eun-seon; Eom Mi-seon; Min Su-hyoun	3:44.70	FA
2	North Korea (PRK); Kang Kum-sun; Kim Ok-bun; Kim Ryon-ok; Yu Sun-ok	3:47.62	FA
3	Chinese Taipei (TPE); Tsai Chia-ying; Hsieh Li-chun; Lin Pei-yin; Yu Chen-chun	3:47.91	FB

=== Finals ===
==== Final B ====
Rank	Team	Time
1	Chinese Taipei (TPE); Tsai Chia-ying; Hsieh Li-chun; Lin Pei-yin; Yu Chen-chun	3:47.83
2	India (IND); Munshadi Khatun; Mamata Jena; Swathy Sanjay; Pravasini Dwibedy	3:57.31
3	Iran (IRI); Mina Amini; Sahra Zolghadr; Minoo Zargari; Saba Shayesteh	4:43.68
—	Kazakhstan (KAZ); Inga Dudchenko; Tatyana Feklistova; Svetlana Germanovich; Mariya Filimonova	DNS

==== Final A ====
Rank	Team	Time
1st place, gold medalist(s)	China (CHN); Cheng Ran; Yu Chengxi; Gao Yanhua; Mu Suli	3:28.18
2nd place, silver medalist(s)	North Korea (PRK); Kang Kum-sun; Kim Ok-bun; Kim Ryon-ok; Yu Sun-ok	3:33.10
3rd place, bronze medalist(s)	South Korea (KOR); Kim Soon-rye; Im Eun-seon; Eom Mi-seon; Min Su-hyoun	3:33.11
4	Vietnam (VIE); Cao Thị Tuyết; Đặng Thị Thắm; Trần Thị Sâm; Mai Thị Dung	3:38.02
