= Yu Fei =

Yu Fei is the atonal pinyin romanization of various Chinese names.

It may refer to:

- Yu Fei, a politician in Guangdong
- Yu Fei (rower), Chinese rower
- Fei Yu
