= Tucholke =

Tucholke is a surname. Notable people with the surname include:

- April Genevieve Tucholke, American author
- Jana Tucholke (born 1981), German discus thrower
- Maja Tucholke (born 1979), German rower
