= Gymnastics at the 2004 Summer Olympics – Women's floor =

Women's floor at the Games of the XXVIII Olympiad
- Venue: Olympic Indoor Hall
- Date: 23 August 2004

Medalists
| 1st place, gold medalist(s) | | Cătălina Ponor | Romania |
| 2nd place, silver medalist(s) | | Nicoleta Daniela Șofronie | Romania |
| 3rd place, bronze medalist(s) | | Patricia Moreno | Spain |

These are the results of the women's floor exercise competition, one of six events for female competitors of the artistic gymnastics discipline contested in the gymnastics at the 2004 Summer Olympics in Athens. The qualification and final rounds took place on August 15 and August 23 at the Olympic Indoor Hall.

The medals for the competition were presented by Carlos Arthur Nuzman, Brazil; IOC Member, and the medalists' bouquets were presented by Jackie Fie, United States; President of the Women's Technical Committee of the FIG.

== Results ==
=== Qualification ===
Eighty-three gymnasts competed in the floor event in the artistic gymnastics qualification round on August 15. The eight highest scoring gymnasts advanced to the final on August 23.

=== Final ===
| Rank | Gymnast | Start Value | Switzerland | Italy | Belgium | Mexico | New Zealand | Great Britain | Penalty | Total |
|---|---|---|---|---|---|---|---|---|---|---|
| Gold medal | Cătălina Ponor (ROU) | 10.00 | 9.75 | 9.75 | 9.75 | 9.75 | 9.75 | 9.75 | — | 9.750 |
| Silver medal | Nicoleta Daniela Șofronie (ROU) | 9.90 | 9.55 | 9.55 | 9.60 | 9.60 | 9.55 | 9.55 | — | 9.562 |
| Bronze medal | Patricia Moreno (ESP) | 10.00 | 9.50 | 9.50 | 9.45 | 9.60 | 9.50 | 9.40 | — | 9.487 |
| 4 | Cheng Fei (CHN) | 9.90 | 9.50 | 9.45 | 9.55 | 9.50 | 9.60 | 9.50 | 0.10 | 9.412 |
| 5 | Daiane dos Santos (BRA) | 10.00 | 9.55 | 9.55 | 9.45 | 9.45 | 9.45 | 9.45 | 0.10 | 9.375 |
| 6 | Mohini Bhardwaj (USA) | 9.70 | 9.30 | 9.30 | 9.35 | 9.30 | 9.30 | 9.40 | — | 9.312 |
| 7 | Kate Richardson (CAN) | 9.90 | 9.40 | 9.35 | 9.35 | 9.45 | 9.50 | 9.45 | 0.10 | 9.312 |
| 8 | Alina Kozich (UKR) | 9.50 | 8.55 | 8.55 | 8.65 | 8.60 | 8.60 | 8.65 | 0.10 | 8.500 |
