= Roslyn McLeod =

Canadian rower

Personal information
- Born: 17 August 1976 (age 49) North York, Ontario, Canada

Sport
- Sport: Rowing

Roslyn McLeod (born 17 August 1976) is a Canadian rower. She competed in the women's eight event at the 2004 Summer Olympics.
