= Sarah Pape =

Canadian rower

Personal information
- Born: 8 August 1972 (age 53) Toronto, Ontario, Canada

Sport
- Sport: Rowing

Sarah Pape (born 8 August 1972) is a Canadian rower. She competed in the women's eight event at the 2004 Summer Olympics.
