= Luo Xiuhua =

Chinese rower

Personal information
- Nationality: Chinese
- Born: 1 June 1977 (age 47); Nanchong, China

Sport
- Sport: Rowing

Luo Xiuhua (born 1 June 1977) is a Chinese rower. She competed in the women's eight event at the 2004 Summer Olympics.
