= Yan Xiaoxia =

Chinese rower

Personal information
- Nationality: Chinese
- Born: 1984; Dalian, China

Sport
- Sport: Rowing

Yan Xiaoxia (born 1984) is a Chinese rower. She competed in the women's eight event at the 2004 Summer Olympics.
