= Britta Holthaus =

German rower (born 1979)

Personal information
- Nationality: German
- Born: 25 January 1979 (age 46); Essen, West Germany

Sport
- Sport: Rowing

Britta Holthaus (born 25 January 1979) is a German rower. She competed in the women's eight event at the 2004 Summer Olympics.
