= Jacqui Cook =

Canadian rower

Personal information
- Born: 13 February 1976 (age 50) Thunder Bay, Ontario, Canada

Sport
- Sport: Rowing

Jacqui Cook (born 13 February 1976) is a Canadian rower. She competed in the women's eight event at the 2004 Summer Olympics.
