= Gymnastics at the 2004 Summer Olympics – Women's balance beam =

Women's balance beam at the Games of the XXVIII Olympiad
- Venue: Olympic Indoor Hall
- Date: 15 – 23 August 2004
- Competitors: 85 from 31 nations

Medalists
| 1st place, gold medalist(s) | | Cătălina Ponor | Romania |
| 2nd place, silver medalist(s) | | Carly Patterson | United States |
| 3rd place, bronze medalist(s) | | Alexandra Eremia | Romania |

The women's balance beam competition was one of six events for female competitors of the artistic gymnastics discipline contested in the gymnastics at the 2004 Summer Olympics in Athens. The qualification and final rounds took place on August 15 and August 23 at the Olympic Indoor Hall.

The medals for the competition were presented by Gian-Franco Kasper, Switzerland; IOC Members, and the medalists' bouquets were presented by Jackie Fie, United States; President of the Women's Technical Committee of the FIG.

== Results ==
=== Qualification ===
Eighty-five gymnasts competed in the balance beam event in the artistic gymnastics qualification round on August 15. The eight highest scoring gymnasts advanced to the final on August 23.

=== Final ===
| Rank | Gymnast | Start Value | Brazil | Argentina | Uzbekistan | Finland | Slovenia | France | Penalty | Total |
|---|---|---|---|---|---|---|---|---|---|---|
| Gold medal | Cătălina Ponor (ROU) | 10.00 | 9.80 | 9.80 | 9.80 | 9.75 | 9.75 | 9.80 | — | 9.787 |
| Silver medal | Carly Patterson (USA) | 10.00 | 9.80 | 9.75 | 9.80 | 9.75 | 9.75 | 9.80 | — | 9.775 |
| Bronze medal | Alexandra Eremia (ROU) | 10.00 | 9.70 | 9.70 | 9.70 | 9.65 | 9.70 | 9.70 | — | 9.700 |
| 4 | Anna Pavlova (RUS) | 10.00 | 9.55 | 9.65 | 9.70 | 9.55 | 9.50 | 9.60 | — | 9.587 |
| 5 | Courtney Kupets (USA) | 9.80 | 9.40 | 9.50 | 9.30 | 9.25 | 9.35 | 9.45 | — | 9.375 |
| 6 | Zhang Nan (CHN) | 10.00 | 9.25 | 9.25 | 9.25 | 9.20 | 9.20 | 9.25 | — | 9.237 |
| 7 | Li Ya (CHN) | 9.80 | 9.05 | 9.10 | 9.05 | 9.05 | 8.90 | 9.05 | — | 9.050 |
| 8 | Allana Slater (AUS) | 9.70 | 8.75 | 8.75 | 8.75 | 8.75 | 8.75 | 8.70 | — | 8.750 |
