= Annina Ruppel =

German rower

Personal information
- Born: 8 October 1980 (age 45) Herne, North Rhine-Westphalia, West Germany
- Height: 160 cm (5 ft 3 in)
- Weight: 50 kg (110 lb)

Sport
- Country: Germany
- Sport: Rowing
- Club: RV Emscher Wanne-Eickel-Herten
Medal record
Women's rowing
Representing Germany
World Rowing Championships Eight
Bronze medal – third place	2001 Lucerne	Eight
Bronze medal – third place	2002 Seville	Eight
Gold medal – first place	2003 Milan	Eight
Silver medal – second place	2006 Dorney	Eight
European Rowing Championships
Silver medal – second place	2007 Poznań	Eight

Annina Ruppel (born 8 October 1980 in Herne, North Rhine-Westphalia) is a German rowing coxswain who competed in the women's eight events at the 2004 Summer Olympics and 2008 Summer Olympics. She was also a part of the women's eight winning team at the 2003 World Rowing Championships.
