= Pauline van Roessel =

Canadian rower

Personal information
- National team: Canada
- Born: 9 May 1967 (age 59) Bow Island, Alberta, Canada
- Height: 180 cm (5 ft 11 in)
- Weight: 70 kg (154 lb; 11 st 0 lb)

Sport
- Country: Canada
- Sport: Rowing
- Event: Coxed Eight - Women

Achievements and titles
- Olympic finals: 2004 Athens
- Personal best: 7th place

Pauline van Roessel (born 9 May 1967) is a Canadian rower. She competed in the women's eight event at the 2004 Summer Olympics. The team has finished in 7th place at the 2004 Summer Olympics held in Athens, Greece. Her current residence is in Calgary, Alberta.
