= Elke Hipler =

German rower (born 1978)

Medal record

Women's rowing

Representing Germany

World Rowing Championships
Gold medal – first place	2003 Milan	W8+
Silver medal – second place	1999 St. Catharines	W2-
Silver medal – second place	2006 Eton	W8+
Silver medal – second place	2007 Munich	W2-
Bronze medal – third place	1997 Aiguebelette	W4-
Bronze medal – third place	2006 Eton	W2-

Elke Hipler (born 19 September 1978 in Essen) is a German rower. She competed in the eight at the 2004 and 2008 Olympics.
