= Karen Clark (rower) =

Canadian rower

Personal information
- Nationality: Canadian
- Born: 6 April 1978 (age 46); Delta, British Columbia, Canada

Sport
- Sport: Rowing

Karen Clark (born 6 April 1978) is a Canadian rower. She competed in the women's eight event at the 2004 Summer Olympics.
