= Kyeema Doyle =

Australian rower

Personal information
- Born: 24 November 1981 (age 43); Sydney, New South Wales, Australia

Sport
- Country: Australia
- Sport: Rowing

Achievements and titles
- Olympic finals: 2004 Women's 8+

Kyeema Doyle (born 24 November 1981) is an Australian rower who competed in the women's eight at the 2004 Summer Olympics.
