= Yu Fei (rower) =

Chinese rower

Personal information
- Nationality: Chinese
- Born: 25 January 1984 (age 41); Beijing, China

Sport
- Sport: Rowing

Yu Fei (born 25 January 1984) is a Chinese rower. She competed in the women's eight event at the 2004 Summer Olympics.
