= Silke Günther =

German rower

Medal record

Women's rowing

Representing Germany

World Rowing Championships
Gold medal – first place	2003 Milan	Eight
Silver medal – second place	2007 Munich	Coxless four
Bronze medal – third place	2001 Lucerne	Eight
Bronze medal – third place	2002 Seville	Eight

European Championships
Silver medal – second place	2007 Poznań	Eight

Silke Günther (born 29 December 1976 in East Berlin, East Germany) is a German rower.
