= Nicole Zimmermann =

German rower (born 1980)

Medal record

Women's rowing

Representing Germany

World Rowing Championships
| Gold medal – first place | 2003 Milan | W8+ |
| Silver medal – second place | 2006 Eton | W8+ |
| Silver medal – second place | 2007 Munich | W2- |
| Bronze medal – third place | 2002 Seville | W8+ |
| Bronze medal – third place | 2006 Eton | W2- |

Nicole Zimmermann (born 11 May 1980 in Rostock) is a German rower.
