= Megan Dirkmaat =

American rower

Personal information
- Born: May 3, 1976 (age 50) San Jose, California, U.S.
Medal record
Women's rowing
Representing United States
Olympic Games
Silver medal – second place	2004 Athens	Eight
World Rowing Championships
Gold medal – first place	2007 Munich	W4-

Megan Dirkmaat (born May 3, 1976) is an American rower. She was born in San Jose, California.

Dirkmaat competed collegiately for the BYU Cougars and the Cal Golden Bears.
