= Alexandra Eremia =

Romanian gymnast (born 1987)

- Full name: Alexandra Georgiana Eremia
- Born: 19 February 1987 (age 39) Bucharest, Romania
- Height: 149 cm (4 ft 11 in)

Gymnastics career
- Discipline: Women's artistic gymnastics
- Country represented: Romania
- Club: C.S.A. Steaua Bucharest
- Gym: Deva National Training Center
- Head coach: Octavian Belu
- Assistant coach: Sandu Lucian
- Former coaches: Eliza Stoica, Elena Ceampelea
- Choreographer: Bitang Maria
- Retired: 2006
Medal record
Olympic Games
Gold medal – first place	2004 Athens	Team
Bronze medal – third place	2004 Athens	Balance Beam
World Championships
Silver medal – second place	2003 Anaheim	Team
European Championships
Gold medal – first place	2004 Amsterdam	Team
Silver medal – second place	2004 Amsterdam	Balance Beam
World Cup Series
Gold medal – first place	2004 Stuttgart	Balance Beam
Silver medal – second place	2004 Stuttgart	Floor
Bronze medal – third place	2004 Birmingham	Balance Beam
Bronze medal – third place	2005 Maribor	Balance Beam

Alexandra Georgiana Eremia (born 19 February 1987) is a Romanian former artistic gymnast. Her best apparatus was the balance beam on which she had an interesting routine starting with her trademark split mount. She is an Olympic and a European gold medalist with the team. Individually, she won several medals on beam in various international competitions. She is the 2004 Olympic bronze medalist and the 2004 European silver medalist on this event.

== Early life and career ==
Eremia was a successful junior gymnast before establishing herself as a strong senior. Eremia was the 2001 Romanian all around silver medalist and was a member of the Romanian team at the 2002 Junior Europeans held in Patras, Greece. Here she placed fourth on beam and won silver with the team.

== Senior career ==
=== 2003 ===
In 2003, Eremia was age eligible to compete as a senior and was a member of the Romanian team that competed at the 2003 World Championships in Anaheim, California. Here she contributed to the team silver medal by competing on beam and on uneven bars.

=== 2004 and Athens Olympics ===
In 2004, she was a member of the Romanian at the European Championships. Eremia won gold with team and an individual silver on beam (9.575). However, it was the 2004 Olympics where Eremia established herself as a star. She was part of an immensely successful Romanian women's gymnastics team (four golds, one silver and one bronze in six events) that also included Oana Ban, Monica Roșu, Silvia Stroescu, Daniela Sofronie and Cătălina Ponor. In the team finals Eremia competed on the balance beam only, where she posted the second highest score of the night. Individually, she won the bronze medal on beam.

=== Post Olympic Games ===
After Athens, she continued her success by competing in World Cup events across Europe as well as winning more fans with her spunky personality which she is known for. She won silver on floor and gold on balance beam at the 2004 DTB Cup in Stuttgart. In December 2004, she won bronze on beam in the World Cup finals in Birmingham. However, in 2005 Eremia did not make it onto the Romanian team to compete at the 2005 World Championships as she struggled with fitness after a year which saw her caught up in controversies such as being caught sneaking from training camps to go nightclubbing.

== Post-retirement ==
Eremia retired in early 2006 as she had little chance of making the Romanian team for the 2006 Europeans. After graduating her University studies she went back to her former club (Steaua Bucharest) where she works as an artistic gymnastic coach for young girls.
