= Alison Cox =

American rower

Personal information
- Born: June 5, 1979 (age 47) Turlock, California, U.S.
Medal record
Women's rowing
Representing United States
Olympic Games
Silver medal – second place	2004 Athens	Eight
World Rowing Championships
Gold medal – first place	2002 Seville	W8+
Bronze medal – third place	2010 Karapiro	W4-

Alison Cox (born June 5, 1979) is an American rower. Born in Turlock, California, she won a silver medal at the 2004 Summer Olympics in the women's eight.
