= Gao Yanhua =

Chinese rower

Personal information
- Nationality: Chinese
- Born: 16 December 1976 (age 48); Fushun, China

Sport
- Sport: Rowing

Gao Yanhua (born 16 December 1976) is a Chinese rower. She competed in the women's eight event at the 2004 Summer Olympics.
