= Samantha Magee =

American rower

Personal information
- Born: July 10, 1983 (age 42) Hartford, Connecticut, U.S.
Medal record
Women's rowing
Representing United States
Olympic Games
Silver medal – second place	2004 Athens	Eight
World Rowing Championships
Gold medal – first place	2007 Munich	Eight

Samantha Magee (born July 10, 1983) is an American rower.
