= Nienke Hommes =

Dutch rower (born 1977)

Medal record

Women's rowing

Representing the Netherlands

Olympic Games
Bronze medal – third place	2004 Athens	Eight

World Rowing Championships
Bronze medal – third place	2005 Gifu	Eight

Nienke Hommes (pronounced [ˈniŋkə ˈɦɔməs]; born 20 February 1977 in Haarlem) is a Dutch rower.
