= Cheng Ran (rower) =

Chinese rower

Personal information
- Nationality: Chinese
- Born: 19 May 1977 (age 48); Zouping, China

Sport
- Sport: Rowing

Cheng Ran (born 19 May 1977) is a Chinese rower. She competed in the women's eight event at the 2004 Summer Olympics.
