= Lianne Nelson =

American rower

Personal information
- Born: June 15, 1972 (age 54) Houston, Texas, U.S.
Medal record
Women's rowing
Representing United States
Olympic Games
| Silver medal – second place | 2004 Athens | Eight |
World Rowing Championships
| Gold medal – first place | 1995 Tampere | Coxless fours |
| Silver medal – second place | 1998 Cologne | Eights |

Lianne McLellan Nelson-Bennion (born June 15, 1972, in Houston, Texas) is an American rower who attended Lakeside High School in Seattle and Princeton University.
