= Froukje Wegman =

Dutch rower (born 1979)

Personal information
- Nationality: Dutch
- Born: 22 April 1979 (age 47) Gouda, Netherlands

Sport
- Country: Netherlands
- Sport: Women's Rowing
- College team: Syracuse Orange (2001)
Medal record
Women's rowing
Representing the Netherlands
Olympic Games
Bronze medal – third place	2004 Athens	Eight

Froukje Wegman (born 22 April 1979 in Gouda) is a Dutch rower. She is notable for having won a bronze medal in Rowing at the 2004 Summer Olympics – Women's eight.

Wegman is a graduate of Syracuse University in New York, earning her degree in 2001.
