= Hurnet Dekkers =

Dutch rower (born 1974)

Medal record

Women's rowing

Representing the Netherlands

Olympic Games
Bronze medal – third place	2004 Athens	Eight

World Rowing Championships
Bronze medal – third place	2005 Gifu	W8+

Hurnet Dekkers (born 8 May 1974 in Rossum, Gelderland) is a Dutch rower.
