= Laurel Korholz =

American rower and rowing coach (born 1970)

Personal information
- Born: June 10, 1970 (age 56) New York City, New York, U.S.
Medal record
Women's rowing
Representing United States
Olympic Games
Silver medal – second place	2004 Athens	Eight
World Rowing Championships
Gold medal – first place	1995 Tampere	Eight
Silver medal – second place	1994 Indianapolis	Eight
World Rowing Cup
Gold medal – first place	2003 Munich	Quad
Gold medal – first place	2004 Munich	Eight
Lucerne International Regatta
Gold medal – first place	1996	Eight
Essen International Regatta
Bronze medal – third place	1996	Eight
Goodwill Games
Bronze medal – third place	1994	Eight

Laurel V. Korholz (born June 10, 1970) was the Women's Assistant Coach for the United States Rowing Team. As a coach, Korholz coached the US Women's Double at the 2008 Summer Olympics. The Beijing Olympics was the fourth Olympics she attended; her first as a coach. As an athlete, she won a silver medal at the 2004 Summer Olympics in the women's eight. Now she is the Assistant Head Coach of Heavyweight Rowing at Columbia University as of 2022

Korholz received a gold medal in the eight at the 2004 Lucerne BearingPoint World Cup, a gold medal at the 2004 Munich BearingPoint World Cup. She placed sixth at the 2003 FISA World Championships in the quads and received a gold medal in the quads at the 2003 Bearing Point World Cup in Milan.

At the 2002 FISA World Championships, she placed eighth in the doubles and fourth in the doubles at the 2002 FISA Lucerne World Cup. Fifth in the quads at the 2000 Olympic Games in Sydney, Australia, bronze in the quads at the Lucerne FISA World Cup in 2000. Fourth in the quad at the 1999 FISA World Championships. Fourth in the doubles at the 1998 FISA World Championships. Ninth in the quads at the 1997 FISA World Championships.

She placed fourth in the eights in the 1996 Olympic Games at Atlanta. Gold medal in the eight at the 1996 Lucerne International Regatta and the 1996 Mannheim International Regatta. Bronze in the eight at the 1996 Essen International Regatta, gold in the eight at the 1995 FISA World Championships, Silver Medal in the eight at the 1994 FISA World Championships. Bronze in the eight (500 m)and fourth in the eight (1000 m) at the 1994 Goodwill Games.

She served as a spare at the 1993 FISA World Championships.

Korholz is an 11-time member of the US National Rowing Team.

She was born in New York City, New York.
