= Susanne Schmidt =

German rower

Medal record

Representing Germany

World Rowing Championships
Gold medal – first place	2003 Milan	W8+
Silver medal – second place	2005 Gifu	W4x
Silver medal – second place	2006 Eton	W2x
Bronze medal – third place	2001 Lucerne	W8+
Bronze medal – third place	2002 Seville	W8+

Susanne Schmidt (born 14 November 1974 in East Berlin) is a German rower.
