= Aurica Bărăscu =

Romanian rower

Personal information
- Full name: Aurica Chiriță-Bărăscu
- Born: Aurica Chiriță; 21 September 1974 (age 51) Nicorești, Galați, Romania

Sport
- Sport: Rowing
Medal record
Women's rowing
Representing Romania
Olympic Games
Gold medal – first place	2004 Athens	Eight
World Championships
Gold medal – first place	1999 St. Catharines	Eight
Silver medal – second place	2001 Lucerne	Eight
Silver medal – second place	2003 Milan	Eight
Silver medal – second place	2007 Munich	Eight
Bronze medal – third place	2000 Zagreb	Coxless four
European Championships
Gold medal – first place	2007 Poznań	Eight

Aurica Bărăscu (née Chiriță, born 21 September 1974) is a Romanian rower.
