= Elena Georgescu =

Romanian rower (born 1964)

Personal information
- Born: Elena Nedelcu; 10 April 1964 (age 62) Bucharest, Romania
Medal record
Women's rowing
Representing Romania
Olympic Games
Gold medal – first place	1996 Atlanta	Eight
Gold medal – first place	2000 Sydney	Eight
Gold medal – first place	2004 Athens	Eight
Silver medal – second place	1992 Barcelona	Eight
Bronze medal – third place	2008 Beijing	Eight
World Rowing Championships
Gold medal – first place	1990 Tasmania	Eight
European Championships
Gold medal – first place	2007 Poznań	Eight

Elena Georgescu (née Nedelcu, born 10 April 1964) is a Romanian coxswain who has won five Olympic medals in the women's eight event. She competed until 1991 under her maiden name.

== See also ==
- List of multiple Olympic medalists in one event
