= Liliana Gafencu =

Romanian rower (born 1975)

Personal information
- Born: 12 July 1975 (age 50) Suceava, Romania
Medal record
Women's rowing
Representing Romania
Olympic Games
Gold medal – first place	1996 Atlanta	Eight
Gold medal – first place	2000 Sydney	Eight
Gold medal – first place	2004 Athens	Eight

Liliana Gafencu (born 12 July 1975) is a Romanian rower, who has won three Olympic gold medals in the eights competition.
