= Rodica Șerban =

Romanian rower

Personal information
- Born: Rodica Maria Florea; 26 May 1983 (age 43)

Sport
- Sport: Rowing
Medal record
Women's rowing
Representing Romania
Olympic Games
Gold medal – first place	2004 Athens	Eight
Bronze medal – third place	2008 Beijing	Eight
European Championships
Gold medal – first place	2007 Poznań	Eight

Rodica Maria Şerban, née Florea (born 26 May 1983) is a Romanian rower. She achieved success in women's eight, where she won a gold medal at the 2004 Summer Olympics, bronze at the 2008 Summer Olympics and a silver medal at the 2005 World Rowing Championships.
