= Doina Ignat =

Romanian rower

Personal information
- Born: 20 December 1968 (age 57) Rădăuți-Prut, Botoşani, Romania
Medal record
Women's rowing
Representing Romania
Olympic Games
Gold medal – first place	1996 Atlanta	Eight
Gold medal – first place	2000 Sydney	Coxless pair
Gold medal – first place	2000 Sydney	Eight
Gold medal – first place	2004 Athens	Eight
Silver medal – second place	1992 Barcelona	Quadruple sculls
Bronze medal – third place	2008 Beijing	Eight
European Championships
Gold medal – first place	2007 Poznań	Eight
Gold medal – first place	2008 Marathon	Eight

Doina Ignat (born 20 December 1968) is a Romanian rower, who has won six Olympic medals during her career.
