= Maja Tucholke =

German rower

Medal record

Women's rowing

Representing Germany

World Rowing Championships
Gold medal – first place	2003 Milan	W8+
Bronze medal – third place	2001 Lucerne	W8+
Bronze medal – third place	2002 Seville	W8+

Maja Tucholke (born 11 February 1979, in Leipzig) is a German rower.
