= Ioana Rotaru =

Romanian rower

Medal record

Women's rowing

Representing Romania

Olympic Games
Gold medal – first place	2004 Athens	Women's eight
Bronze medal – third place	2008 Beijing	Women's eight

World Rowing Championships
Silver medal – second place	2005 Gifu	W8+
Silver medal – second place	2007 Munich	W8+

European Championships
Gold medal – first place	2007 Poznań	W8+
Gold medal – first place	2008 Athens	W8+
Gold medal – first place	2012 Varese	W8+

Ioana Cristina Rotaru (née Papuc, 4 January 1984) is a Romanian rower. She competed at the 2008 Summer Olympics, where she won a bronze medal in women's eight. At the 2004 Summer Olympics she won a gold medal at the same discipline. At the 2012 Summer Olympics, she was part of the Romanian team that finished 4th.
