= Elisabeta Lipă =

Romanian rower (born 1964)

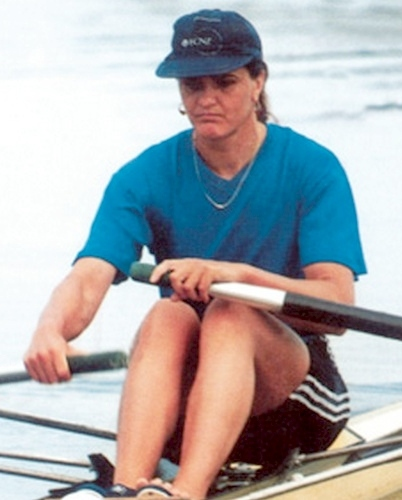
- Lipă in 1992

Personal information
- Born: Elisabeta Oleniuc; 26 October 1964 (age 61) Candesti, Botoșani County, Romania
- Height: 1.83 m (6 ft 0 in)
- Weight: 80 kg (176 lb)

Minister of Youth and Sport
- In office 17 November 2015 – 4 January 2017
- President: Klaus Iohannis
- Prime Minister: Dacian Cioloș
- Preceded by: Gabriela Szabo
- Succeeded by: Marius-Alexandru Dunca

Sport
- Sport: Rowing
- Club: CS Dinamo București
Medal record
Representing Romania
Olympic Games
Gold medal – first place	1984 Los Angeles	Double sculls
Gold medal – first place	1992 Barcelona	Single sculls
Gold medal – first place	1996 Atlanta	Eight
Gold medal – first place	2000 Sydney	Eight
Gold medal – first place	2004 Athens	Eight
Silver medal – second place	1988 Seoul	Double sculls
Silver medal – second place	1992 Barcelona	Double sculls
Bronze medal – third place	1988 Seoul	Quadruple sculls
World Championships
Gold medal – first place	1989 Bled	Single scull
Silver medal – second place	1985 Hazewinkel	Double sculls
Silver medal – second place	1986 Nottingham	Double sculls
Silver medal – second place	1987 Copenhagen	Double sculls
Silver medal – second place	1989 Bled	Double sculls
Silver medal – second place	1991 Vienna	Single sculls
Silver medal – second place	1991 Vienna	Double sculls
Silver medal – second place	1994 Indianapolis	Coxless pairs
Silver medal – second place	2003 Milan	Eights
Bronze medal – third place	1982 Lucerne	Quadruple sculls
Bronze medal – third place	1983 Duisburg	Double sculls
Bronze medal – third place	1984 Montreal	Eights
Bronze medal – third place	1994 Indianapolis	Eights
Summer Universiade
Gold medal – first place	1989 Duisburg	Single sculls

Elisabeta Lipă (Romanian pronunciation: [elisaˈbeta ˈlipə]; née Oleniuc on 26 October 1964) is a retired rower and government official from Romania. She is the most decorated rower in the history of the Olympics, winning five gold, two silver and one bronze medals. She holds the record amongst rowers for the most years between gold medals, at 20 years.

Since 2004, Lipă has served in various government positions including Minister of Youth and Sport under Dacian Cioloș from 2015 to 2017. Since 2009, she has also served as the president of the Romanian Rowing Federation and the Dinamo București Sports Club.

== Career ==
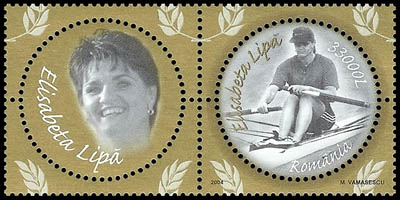
Lipă on a 2004 Romanian stamp

Lipă made her debut at the age of 19 at the 1984 Summer Olympics in Los Angeles, California, where she won her first gold medal in the double sculls event. She won her most recent gold medal in the eight at the Athens Summer Olympics in 2004. She is the only person to win a gold medal in the two premiere rowing events: the single scull and the eight. She is also one of very few women to win a gold medal in both a sculling and a sweep event. (Canada's Kathleen Heddle and Marnie McBean accomplished the same, sculling and sweep gold medals, in 1992 and 1996. Also, Romanians Simona Radis and Ancuta Bodnar, gold in double sculls in Tokyo, 2020, and eight, in Paris 2024.)

In 2004, she became the first female rower and the second rower overall to compete at six Olympics. This was first done by Czechoslovak rower Jiří Pták (cox) in 1992 and equalled in 2008 by Canadian Lesley Thompson (cox), Estonian Jüri Jaanson, and Australian James Tomkins.

== Later life ==
In 2008 she was awarded the Thomas Keller Medal at the Rowing World Cup in Lucerne and became an honorary citizen of her native town Siret. From November 2015 to January 2017, she served as the Romanian Minister of Youth and Sport in the Cioloș Cabinet.

== See also ==
- List of athletes with the most appearances at Olympic Games
- List of multiple Olympic gold medalists
- List of multiple Summer Olympic medalists
