= Nicoleta Daniela Șofronie =

Romanian artistic gymnast

Daniela Șofronie
- Full name: Nicoleta Daniela Șofronie
- Nickname: Dana
- Born: 12 February 1988 (age 38) Constanța, Romania

Gymnastics career
- Discipline: Women's artistic gymnastics
- Country represented: Romania
- Club: CSS Constanța
- Head coach: Octavian Belu
- Assistant coach: Mariana Bitang
- Former coach: Mirela Szemerjai
- Retired: 2005
Medal record
Olympic Games
Gold medal – first place	2004 Athens	Team all-around
Silver medal – second place	2004 Athens	Floor exercise
European Championships
Gold medal – first place	2004 Amsterdam	Team all-around
Silver medal – second place	2004 Amsterdam	All-around

Nicoleta Daniela "Dana" Șofronie (born 12 February 1988 in Constanța, Romania) is a Romanian artistic gymnast. She is an Olympic and European gold medalist with the team, as well as the silver medalist on floor exercise at the 2004 Summer Olympics and the all-around silver medalist at the 2004 European Championships.

== Gymnastics career ==
Șofronie started gymnastics in 1992 in her hometown, Constanța, and moved to Deva in 2002 to train with the national team. In 2003, she was an alternate to the Romanian team at the 2003 World Artistic Gymnastics Championships.

Practically unknown before 2004, she gained international recognition by winning a silver medal in the all-around final at the 2004 European Artistic Gymnastics Championships in Amsterdam. Her score in the all-around was 0.38 points behind that of the gold medalist, Alina Kozich of Ukraine, one of the narrowest margins of victory in European history. After three rotations (vault, uneven bars and balance beam), Kozich was 0.137 points behind Șofronie. However, in the last rotation, the floor exercise, Șofronie did not receive full credit for her dance connections, which lowered the start value of her routine to 9.70. At the same time, speculation was made that a Russian judge, Lyubov Adrianova, had influenced the elevation of Kozich's start value from 9.90 to 10. Despite this controversy, the European Union of Gymnastics and the International Federation of Gymnastics both affirmed the results of the competition. Șofronie also contributed to the Romanian team's gold-medal performance in Amsterdam, the first time since 1998 that they had taken this title. A picture of her performing at the championships was on the cover of the June/July 2004 issue of International Gymnast.

Later that year, she helped the Romanian team win the gold medal at the 2004 Summer Olympics in Athens. She competed on vault, bars and floor in the team final, scoring 9.400, 9.562 and 9.562, respectively. Individually, she won a silver medal on floor behind teammate Cătălina Ponor, placed fifth in the all-around final and sixth on uneven bars. Unusually for a Romanian gymnast, she was a strong bars worker and comparatively weak on beam.

Following a subpar performance at the 2005 European Championships, Șofronie retired from the sport and pursued her education.

== Retirement ==
After retiring from gymnastics, Șofronie graduated from high school and university. She was for a short period a member of the Romanian Golden Team, a gymnastics show set up by Marius Urzică. She is currently working as an assistant coach at the Constanța club where she started her career.
