= China at the 2004 Summer Olympics =

- IOC code: CHN
- NOC: Chinese Olympic Committee
- Website: www.olympic.cn

in Athens
- Competitors: 407 in 26 sports
- Flag bearers: Yao Ming (opening); Liu Xiang (closing)
- Medals Ranked 2nd: Gold 32 Silver 17 Bronze 14 Total 63

Summer Olympics appearances (overview)
- 1952; 1956–1980; 1984; 1988; 1992; 1996; 2000; 2004; 2008; 2012; 2016; 2020; 2024; 2028

Other related appearances
- Republic of China (1924–1948)

China competed at the 2004 Summer Olympics in Athens, Greece, from 13 to 29 August 2004. This was the nation's ninth appearance at the Summer Olympics since its debut in 1952. A total of 407 Chinese athletes, 138 men and 269 women, were selected by the Chinese Olympic Committee to compete in 26 sports. For the third time in its Olympic history, China was represented by more female than male athletes.

China left Athens with a total of 63 Olympic medals – 32 golds, 17 silver, and 14 bronze – finishing third in the overall medal standings and second only to the United States in the gold medal tally. The Chinese delegation proved particularly successful in several sports, winning nine medals each in diving and shooting, eight in weightlifting, six in table tennis, and five each in badminton and judo. Chinese athletes dominated in badminton, diving, and table tennis, where they each won gold medals in most sporting events. Three Chinese athletes managed to defend their titles from the 2000 Summer Olympics in Sydney, while six of them won more than a single medal in Athens. China's team-based athletes came strong and successful in Athens, as the women's volleyball team managed to strike the Russians for the gold medal.

Among the nation's medalists were hurdler Liu Xiang, who emerged as China's first male athlete to win an Olympic gold medal in men's track and field, badminton player Zhang Ning in the women's singles, diving tandem Wu Minxia and Guo Jingjing in the women's synchronized platform, and tennis players Li Ting and Sun Tiantian, who became the first Asians to capture an Olympic title in the women's doubles. Badminton player Gao Ling, who won a gold and a silver in both the mixed doubles with Zhang Jun and the women's doubles with Huang Sui, became the most decorated Chinese athlete in the sporting history with a total of four Olympic medals. Along with Zhang Jun and Gao Ling for their Olympic defense campaign, taekwondo jin Chen Zhong successfully repeated her gold medal from Sydney in the women's heavyweight division.

With Beijing being the host city of the 2008 Summer Olympics, a traditional Chinese segment directed by Zhang Yimou was performed during the closing ceremony.

== Medalists ==
Medal	Name	Sport	Event	Date
Gold	Tian Liang; Yang Jinghui	Diving	Men's 10 m synchronized platform	August 14
Gold	Guo Jingjing; Wu Minxia	Diving	Women's 3 m synchronized springboard	August 14
Gold	Wang Yifu	Shooting	Men's 10 m air pistol	August 14
Gold	Du Li	Shooting	Women's 10 m air rifle	August 14
Gold	Xian Dongmei	Judo	Women's 52 kg	August 15
Gold	Lao Lishi; Li Ting	Diving	Women's 10 m synchronized platform	August 16
Gold	Zhu Qinan	Shooting	Men's 10 m air rifle	August 16
Gold	Luo Xuejuan	Swimming	Women's 100 m breaststroke	August 16
Gold	Shi Zhiyong	Weightlifting	Men's 62 kg	August 16
Gold	Chen Yanqing	Weightlifting	Women's 58 kg	August 16
Gold	Zhang Guozheng	Weightlifting	Men's 69 kg	August 18
Gold	Zhang Ning	Badminton	Women's singles	August 19
Gold	Liu Chunhong	Weightlifting	Women's 69 kg	August 19
Gold	Gao Ling; Zhang Jun	Badminton	Mixed doubles	August 19
Gold	Yang Wei; Zhang Jiewen	Badminton	Women's doubles	August 20
Gold	Wang Nan; Zhang Yining	Table tennis	Women's doubles	August 20
Gold	Chen Qi; Ma Lin	Table tennis	Men's doubles	August 21
Gold	Tang Gonghong	Weightlifting	Women's +75 kg	August 21
Gold	Teng Haibin	Gymnastics	Men's pommel horse	August 22
Gold	Zhang Yining	Table tennis	Women's singles	August 22
Gold	Li Ting; Sun Tiantian	Tennis	Women's doubles	August 22
Gold	Jia Zhanbo	Shooting	Men's 50 m rifle 3 positions	August 23
Gold	Wang Xu	Wrestling	Women's freestyle 72 kg	August 23
Gold	Peng Bo	Diving	Men's 3 m springboard	August 24
Gold	Guo Jingjing	Diving	Women's 3 m springboard	August 26
Gold	Liu Xiang	Athletics	Men's 110 m hurdles	August 27
Gold	Xing Huina	Athletics	Women's 10000 m	August 27
Gold	Luo Wei	Taekwondo	Women's 67 kg	August 27
Gold	Meng Guanliang; Yang Wenjun	Canoeing	Men's C-2 500 m	August 28
Gold	Hu Jia	Diving	Men's 10 m platform	August 28
Gold	Chen Zhong	Taekwondo	Women's +67 kg	August 28
Gold	China women's national volleyball team: Chen Jing; Feng Kun; Li Shan; Liu Yanan; Song Nina; Wang Lina; Yang Hao; Zhang Na; Zhang Ping; Zhang Yuehong; Zhao Ruirui; Zhou Suhong	Volleyball	Women's tournament	August 28
Silver	Li Zhuo	Weightlifting	Women's 48 kg	August 14
Silver	Wu Meijin	Weightlifting	Men's 56 kg	August 15
Silver	Li Jie	Shooting	Men's 10 m air rifle	August 16
Silver	Le Maosheng	Weightlifting	Men's 62 kg	August 16
Silver	Wang Lei	Fencing	Men's épée	August 17
Silver	Tan Xue	Fencing	Women's sabre	August 17
Silver	Li Ji; Pang Jiaying; Xu Yanwei; Yang Yu; Zhu Yingwen	Swimming	Women's 4 × 200 m freestyle relay	August 18
Silver	Liu Xia	Judo	Women's 78 kg	August 19
Silver	Wei Ning	Shooting	Women's skeet	August 19
Silver	He Ying; Lin Sang; Zhang Juanjuan	Archery	Women's team	August 20
Silver	Gao Ling; Huang Sui	Badminton	Women's doubles	August 20
Silver	Jiang Yonghua	Cycling	Women's track time trial	August 20
Silver	Dong Zhaozhi; Wang Haibin; Wu Hanxiong; Ye Chong	Fencing	Men's team foil	August 21
Silver	Lao Lishi	Diving	Women's 10 m platform	August 22
Silver	Wang Hao	Table tennis	Men's singles	August 23
Silver	Yin Jian	Sailing	Women's sailboard	August 25
Silver	Wu Minxia	Diving	Women's 3 m springboard	August 26
Bronze	Gao Feng	Judo	Women's 48 kg	August 14
Bronze	Wang Zheng	Shooting	Men's double trap	August 17
Bronze	Gao E	Shooting	Women's double trap	August 18
Bronze	Zhou Mi	Badminton	Women's singles	August 19
Bronze	Zhang Nan	Gymnastics	Women's individual all-around	August 19
Bronze	Qin Dongya	Judo	Women's 70 kg	August 19
Bronze	Wang Chengyi	Shooting	Women's 50 m rifle 3 positions	August 20
Bronze	Niu Jianfeng; Guo Yue	Table tennis	Women's doubles	August 20
Bronze	Huang Shanshan	Gymnastics	Women's trampoline	August 21
Bronze	Sun Fuming	Judo	Women's +78 kg	August 21
Bronze	Li Xiaopeng	Gymnastics	Men's parallel bars	August 23
Bronze	Wang Liqin	Table tennis	Men's singles	August 23
Bronze	Tian Liang	Diving	Men's 10 m platform	August 28
Bronze	Zou Shiming	Boxing	Men's light flyweight	August 29

Medals by sport
Sport	1st place, gold medalist(s)	2nd place, silver medalist(s)	3rd place, bronze medalist(s)	Total
Diving	6	2	1	9
Weightlifting	5	3	0	8
Shooting	4	3	2	9
Table tennis	3	1	2	6
Badminton	3	1	1	5
Athletics	2	0	0	2
Taekwondo	2	0	0	2
Judo	1	1	3	5
Swimming	1	1	0	2
Gymnastics	1	0	3	4
Canoeing	1	0	0	1
Tennis	1	0	0	1
Volleyball	1	0	0	1
Wrestling	1	0	0	1
Fencing	0	3	0	3
Archery	0	1	0	1
Cycling	0	1	0	1
Sailing	0	1	0	1
Boxing	0	0	1	1
Total	32	17	14	63

== Archery ==
Five Chinese archers (two men and three women) qualified each for the men's and women's individual archery, and a spot for the women's team.

Men

Athlete	Event	Ranking round		Round of 64	Round of 32	Round of 16	Quarterfinals	Semifinals	Final / BM	
Athlete	Event	Score	Seed	Opposition Score	Opposition Score	Opposition Score	Opposition Score	Opposition Score	Opposition Score	Rank
Xue Haifeng	Individual	653	27	Chapoy (MEX); W 162–153	Hrachov (UKR); W 162–161	Wunderle (USA); L 164–165	Did not advance			
Yong Fujun	Individual	652	28	Furukawa (JPN); L 143–146	Did not advance					

Women

Athlete	Event	Ranking round		Round of 64	Round of 32	Round of 16	Quarterfinals	Semifinals	Final / BM	
Athlete	Event	Score	Seed	Opposition Score	Opposition Score	Opposition Score	Opposition Score	Opposition Score	Opposition Score	Rank
He Ying	Individual	667	4	Palmer (GBR); W 135–122	Jennison (AUS); W 166–157	Lewis (RSA); W 156–142	Williamson (GBR); L 89–109	Did not advance		
Lin Sang	Individual	647	11	Chhoden (BHU); L 156–159	Did not advance					
Zhang Juanjuan	Individual	663	5	Trayan (FRA); W 135–122	Marcinkiewicz (POL); W 166–157	Williamson (GBR); L 161–165	Did not advance			
He Ying; Lin Sang; Zhang Juanjuan	Team	1977	2	—N/a		Australia; W 248–233	Ukraine; W 241–230	Chinese Taipei; W 230–226	South Korea; L 240–241	2nd place, silver medalist(s)

== Athletics ==
Chinese athletes have so far achieved qualifying standards in the following athletics events (up to a maximum of 3 athletes in each event at the 'A' Standard, and 1 at the 'B' Standard).

Key

- Note–Ranks given for track events are within the athlete's heat only
- Q = Qualified for the next round
- q = Qualified for the next round as a fastest loser or, in field events, by position without achieving the qualifying target
- NR = National record
- N/A = Round not applicable for the event
- Bye = Athlete not required to compete in round

Men
Track & road events

Athlete	Event	Heat		Quarterfinal		Semifinal		Final	
Athlete	Event	Result	Rank	Result	Rank	Result	Rank	Result	Rank
Alatan Gadasu	50 km walk	—N/a						3:51:55	10
Chen Haijian	100 m	10.45	5	Did not advance					
Dou Zhaobo	1500 m	3:50.28	11	—N/a		Did not advance			
Han Gang	Marathon	—N/a						2:27:31	66
Han Yucheng	20 km walk	—N/a						1:32:18	40
Han Yucheng	50 km walk	—N/a						DNF	
Li Zhuhong	Marathon	—N/a						2:19:26	31
Liu Xiang	110 m hurdles	13.27	1 Q	13.27	1 Q	13.18	2 Q	12.91 OR	1st place, gold medalist(s)
Liu Yunfeng	20 km walk	—N/a						1:27:21	25
Shi Dongpeng	110 m hurdles	13.68	6	Did not advance					
Yang Yaozu	200 m	20.59	4 Q	21.03	8	Did not advance			
Yu Chaohong	50 km walk	—N/a						3:43:45	4
Zhu Hongjun	20 km walk	—N/a						1:21:40	6
Zhu Ronghua	Marathon	—N/a						2:34:02	76

Field events

Athlete	Event	Qualification		Final	
Athlete	Event	Distance	Position	Distance	Position
Li Rongxiang	Javelin throw	79.94	15	Did not advance	
Li Yanxi	Triple jump	16.74	15	Did not advance	
Liu Feiliang	Pole vault	NM	—	Did not advance	
Liu Yang	High jump	2.10	36	Did not advance	
Wu Tao	Discus throw	60.60	18	Did not advance	
Zhou Can	Long jump	7.47	34	Did not advance	

Combined events – Decathlon

Athlete	Event	100 m	LJ	SP	HJ	400 m	110H	DT	PV	JT	1500 m	Final	Rank
Qi Haifeng	Result	11.06	7.34	13.55	1.97	49.65	14.78	45.13	4.50	60.79	4:32.63	7934	18
Qi Haifeng	Points	847	896	701	776	831	876	770	760	750	727	7934	18

Women
Track & road events

Athlete	Event	Heat		Quarterfinal		Semifinal		Final	
Athlete	Event	Result	Rank	Result	Rank	Result	Rank	Result	Rank
Bo Fanfang	400 m	56.01	7	—N/a		Did not advance			
Huang Xiaoxiao	400 m hurdles	54.81	3 q	—N/a		55.53	8	Did not advance	
Jiang Jing	20 km walk	—N/a						1:35:56	32
Li Helan	Marathon	—N/a						2:37:53	22
Li Xuemei	100 m	12.21	7	Did not advance					
Song Hongjuan	20 km walk	—N/a						1:31:27	14
Su Yiping	100 m hurdles	13.53	7	—N/a		Did not advance			
Sun Yingjie	5000 m	15:03.00	7 q	—N/a				15:07.23	8
Sun Yingjie	10000 m	—N/a						30:54.37	6
Wang Liping	20 km walk	—N/a						1:30:16	8
Xing Huina	5000 m	14:56.01	5 Q	—N/a				15:07.41	9
Xing Huina	10000 m	—N/a						30:24.36	1st place, gold medalist(s)
Zhang Shujing	Marathon	—N/a						2:34:34	12
Zhou Chunxiu	Marathon	—N/a						2:42:54	33

Field events

Athlete	Event	Qualification		Final	
Athlete	Event	Distance	Position	Distance	Position
Gao Shuying	Pole vault	4.15	=24	Did not advance	
Gu Yuan	Hammer throw	71.65	3 Q	69.76	10
Guan Yingnan	Long jump	6.46	19	Did not advance	
Huang Qiuyan	Triple jump	14.66	6 Q	14.33	12
Huang Qun	Discus throw	56.53	32	Did not advance	
Jing Xuezhu	High jump	1.89	=16	Did not advance	
Li Fengfeng	Shot put	16.90	23	Did not advance	
Li Meiju	Shot put	18.16	11 q	18.37	9
Li Yanfeng	Discus throw	61.35	12 q	61.05	8
Liang Shuyan	Long jump	5.92	35	Did not advance	
Liu Yinghui	Hammer throw	68.12	14	Did not advance	
Ma Ning	Javelin throw	59.80	18	Did not advance	
Song Aimin	Discus throw	58.19	25	Did not advance	
Wang Lina	Long jump	6.53	14	Did not advance	
Xue Juan	Javelin throw	52.97	37	Did not advance	
Zhang Hao	Triple jump	13.30	32	Did not advance	
Zhang Wenxiu	Hammer throw	71.56	5 Q	72.03	7
Zhang Xiaoyu	Shot put	17.22	20	Did not advance	
Zhao Yingying	Pole vault	4.30	23	Did not advance	

Combined events – Heptathlon

Athlete	Event	100H	HJ	SP	200 m	LJ	JT	800 m	Final	Rank
Shen Shengfei	Result	14.18	1.73	14.22	26.01	NM	46.95	2:29.50	4949	27
Shen Shengfei	Points	953	891	809	796	0	801	699	4949	27

== Badminton ==
Men

Athlete	Event	Round of 32	Round of 16	Quarterfinal	Semifinal	Final / BM	
Athlete	Event	Opposition Score	Opposition Score	Opposition Score	Opposition Score	Opposition Score	Rank
Bao Chunlai	Singles	Satō (JPN); W 15–6, 15–5	Park T-S (KOR); L 11–15, 12–15	Did not advance			
Chen Hong	Singles	Jonassen (DEN); W 12–15, 15–9, 15–9	Lee C W (MAS); W 15–11, 3–15, 15–12	Shon S-M (KOR); L 15–10, 4–15, 10–15	Did not advance		
Lin Dan	Singles	Susilo (SIN); L 12–15 10–15	Did not advance				
Cai Yun; Fu Haifeng	Doubles	Bye	Masuda / Ohtsuka (JPN); W 15–7, 16–17, 15–9	Eriksen / Hansen (DEN); L 15–3, 11–15, 8–15	Did not advance		
Sang Yang; Zheng Bo	Doubles	Bye	Chan C M / Chew C E (MAS); W 15–11, 15–7	Ha T-K / Kim D-M (KOR); L 7–15, 11–15	Did not advance		

Women

Athlete	Event	Round of 32	Round of 16	Quarterfinal	Semifinal	Final / BM	
Athlete	Event	Opposition Score	Opposition Score	Opposition Score	Opposition Score	Opposition Score	Rank
Gong Ruina	Singles	Li L (SIN); W 11–9, 11–4	Ponsana (THA); W 11–8, 11–3	Cheng S-C (TPE); W 11–3, 11–3	Audina (NED); L 4–11, 2–11	Zhou M (CHN); L 2–11, 11–8, 6–11	4
Zhang Ning	Singles	Andrievskaya (SWE); W 4–11, 11–3, 11–7	Morgan (GBR); W 11–6, 11–8	Wang C (HKG); W 6–11, 11–6, 11–7	Zhou M (CHN); W 11–6, 11–4	Audina (NED); W 8–11, 11–6, 11–7	1st place, gold medalist(s)
Zhou Mi	Singles	Xu Hw (GER); W 9–11, 11–5, 11–2	Mori (JPN); W 11–2, 11–4	Nedelcheva (BUL); W 11–4, 11–1	Zhang N (CHN); L 6–11, 4–11	Gong Rn (CHN); W 11–2, 8–11, 11–6	3rd place, bronze medalist(s)
Gao Ling; Huang Sui	Doubles	Bye	Chin E H / Wong P T (MAS); W 15–12, 15–8	Jørgensen / Olsen (DEN); W 15–6, 15–7	Hwang Y-M / Lee H-J (KOR); W 15–10, 17–14	Yang W / Zhang Jw (CHN); L 15–7, 4–15, 8–15	2nd place, silver medalist(s)
Wei Yili; Zhao Tingting	Doubles	Bye	Emms / Kellogg (GBR); W 13–15, 15–7, 15–5	Hwang Y-M / Lee H-J (KOR); W 8–15, 15–6, 15–13	Gao L / Huang S (CHN); L 10–15, 14–17	Lee K-W / Ra K-M (KOR); L 15–10, 9–15,7–15	4
Yang Wei; Zhang Jiewen	Doubles	Bye	Novita / Nurlita (INA); W 15–2, 6–15, 15–7	Chankrachangwong / Thungthongkam (THA); W 15–2, 15–4	Lee K-W / Ra K-M (KOR); W 15–6, 15–4	Gao L / Huang S (CHN); W 7–15, 15–4, 11–8	1st place, gold medalist(s)

Mixed

Athlete	Event	Round of 32	Round of 16	Quarterfinal	Semifinal	Final / BM	
Athlete	Event	Opposition Score	Opposition Score	Opposition Score	Opposition Score	Opposition Score	Rank
Chen Qiqiu; Zhao Tingting	Doubles	Bye	Nugroho / Widiowati (INA); W 15–2, 15–3	Emms / Robertson (GBR); L 8–15, 15–17	Did not advance		
Gao Ling; Zhang Jun	Doubles	Bye	Cheng W-H / Tsai C-H (TPE); W 15–5, 15–2	Bergström / Persson (SWE); W 15–3, 15–1	Eriksen / Schjoldager (DEN); W 15–9, 15–5	Emms / Robertson (GBR); W 15–1, 12–15, 15–12	1st place, gold medalist(s)

== Basketball ==
=== Men's tournament ===
Roster

The following is the China roster in the men's basketball tournament of the 2004 Summer Olympics.

China men's national basketball team – 2004 Summer Olympics roster
Players
Coaches

Pos.	No.	Name	Age – Date of birth	Height	Club	Ctr.
F	4	Chen Ke	25 – 16 May 1979	2.04 m (6 ft 8 in)	Bayi Rockets	(China)
G	5	Liu Wei	24 – 15 January 1980	1.90 m (6 ft 3 in)	Shanghai Sharks	(China)
G	6	Zhang Jingsong	27 – 20 March 1977	1.82 m (6 ft 0 in)	Beijing Ducks	(China)
G	7	Guo Shiqiang	29 – 8 July 1975	1.92 m (6 ft 4 in)	Liaoning Hunters	(China)
F	8	Zhu Fangyu	21 – 5 January 1983	2.01 m (6 ft 7 in)	Guangdong Southern Tigers	(China)
F	9	Zhang Yunsong	30 – 2 September 1973	1.98 m (6 ft 6 in)	Bayi Rockets	(China)
F	10	Li Nan (C)	27 – 25 September 1976	1.98 m (6 ft 6 in)	Bayi Rockets	(China)
F	11	Yi Jianlian	16 – 27 October 1987	2.12 m (6 ft 11 in)	Guangdong Southern Tigers	(China)
F	12	Mo Ke	21 – 8 September 1982	2.08 m (6 ft 10 in)	Shenyang Army	(China)
C	13	Yao Ming	23 – 12 September 1980	2.26 m (7 ft 5 in)	Houston Rockets	(United States)
C	14	Mengke Bateer	28 – 20 November 1975	2.10 m (6 ft 11 in)	Toronto Raptors	(Canada)
F	15	Du Feng	23 – 30 July 1981	2.07 m (6 ft 9 in)	Guangdong Southern Tigers	(China)

Head coach

- (United States) Del Harris

Assistant coach(es)

- (Lithuania) Jonas Kazlauskas
- (China) Adiljan Jun

Legend

- (C) Team captain
- nat field describes country
  of last club
  before the tournament
- Age as of August 13, 2004

Group play

Pos	Team	Pld	W	L	PF	PA	PD	Pts	Qualification
1	Spain	5	5	0	405	349	+56	10	Quarterfinals
2	Italy	5	3	2	371	341	+30	8 (Note: Head-to-head record: Italy 1–0 Argentina)	Quarterfinals
3	Argentina	5	3	2	414	396	+18	8	Quarterfinals
4	China	5	2	3	303	382	−79	7	Quarterfinals
5	New Zealand	5	1	4	399	413	−14	6 (Note: Head-to-head record: New Zealand 1–0 Serbia and Montenegro)	9th place playoff
6	Serbia and Montenegro	5	1	4	377	388	−11	6	11th place playoff

Source: FIBA archive
Rules for classification: 1) points; 2) head-to-head points; 3) head-to-head goal average; 4) head-to-head number of points scored.
Notes:

15 August 2004
14:30

China	58–83	Spain
Scoring by quarter: 18–18, 12–24, 13–19, 15–22
Pts: Li Nan 14; Rebs: Mo Ke, Yao Ming 8 each Asts: Liu Wei 2		Pts: Gasol 21; Rebs: Gasol 10; Asts: Calderón, Gasol 2 each

Helliniko Indoor Arena, Athens
Attendance: 9,500
Referees:
Lazaros Voreadis (Greece)
Jorge Vazquez (Puerto Rico)

17 August 2004
9:00

New Zealand	62–69	China
Scoring by quarter: 14–17, 6–12, 25–22, 17–18
Pts: Jones 27; Rebs: Book, Marks 7 each Asts: Dickel 2		Pts: Yao Ming 39; Rebs: Yao Ming 13; Asts: Li Nan, Liu Wei 4 each

Helliniko Indoor Arena, Athens
Attendance: 1,300
Referees:
Christos Christodoulou (Greece)
Virginijus Dovidavicius (Lithuania)

19 August 2004
20:00

Argentina	82–57	China
Scoring by quarter: 22–14, 19–7, 24–18, 17–18
Pts: Nocioni 17; Rebs: Delfino, Nocioni 6 each Asts: Scola, Sconochini 4 each		Pts: Yao Ming 15; Rebs: Yao Ming 7 Asts: Liu Wei 2

Helliniko Indoor Arena, Athens
Attendance: 12,000
Referees: Sean Corbin (USA), Scott Buttler (AUS)

21 August 2004
16:45

China	52–89	Italy
Scoring by quarter: 11–22, 15–22, 13–16, 13–29
Pts: Li Nan, Yao Ming 9 each Rebs: Yi Jianlian 7 Asts: Yao Ming 2		Pts: Galanda 22; Rebs: Soragna 5 Asts: Pozzecco 12

Helliniko Indoor Arena, Athens
Attendance: 7,600
Referees:
Lazaros Voreadis (Greece)
Jorge Vazquez (Puerto Rico)

23 August 2004
16:45

Serbia and Montenegro	66–67	China
Scoring by quarter: 21–16, 13–15, 20–20, 12–16
Pts: Drobnjak 17; Rebs: Tomašević 11; Asts: Tomašević 4		Pts: Yao Ming 27; Rebs: Yao Ming 13; Asts: Liu Wei 3

Helliniko Indoor Arena, Athens
Attendance: 11,150
Referees:
Christos Christodoulou (Greece)
Michael Aylen (Australia)

Quarterfinals

26 August 2004
16:45

Lithuania	95–75	China
Scoring by quarter: 25–19, 28–18, 21–20, 21–18
Pts: Macijauskas 32; Rebs: E. Žukauskas 8 Asts: Šiškauskas 4		Pts: Yao Ming 29; Rebs: Yao Ming 11; Asts: Liu Wei 4

Olympic Indoor Hall, Athens
Attendance: 14,500
Referees: Mike Homsy (CAN), Christos Christodoulou (GRE)

Classification match (7th–8th place)

28 August 2004
9:00

7th place

China	76–92	Spain
Scoring by quarter: 21–25, 11–17, 18–23, 26–27
Pts: Li Nan 16; Rebs: Yao Ming 7 Asts: Yao Ming 3		Pts: Gasol 37; Rebs: Gasol 7 Asts: Calderón 6

Olympic Indoor Hall, Athens
Attendance: 8,200
Referees:
Alejandro Chiti (Argentina)
Virginijus Dovidavicius (Lithuania)

=== Women's tournament ===
Roster

The following is the China roster in the women's basketball tournament of the 2004 Summer Olympics.

China women's national basketball team – 2004 Summer Olympics roster
Players
Coaches

Pos.	No.	Name	Age – Date of birth	Height	Club	Ctr.
G	4	Song Xiaoyun	21 – 11 December 1982	1.75 m (5 ft 9 in)	Guangdong Hongjia	(China)
F	5	Bian Lan	17 – 16 August 1986	1.80 m (5 ft 11 in)	Jiangsu Phoenix	(China)
F	6	Pan Wei	26 – 11 June 1978	1.80 m (5 ft 11 in)	Guangdong Hongjia	(China)
F	7	Hu Xiaotao	23 – 12 June 1981	1.87 m (6 ft 2 in)	Shenyang Army Golden Lions	(China)
F	8	Miao Lijie	23 – 3 June 1981	1.78 m (5 ft 10 in)	Heilongjiang Dragons	(China)
F	9	Zhang Fan	19 – 22 August 1984	1.87 m (6 ft 2 in)	Beijing Great Wall	(China)
F	10	Sui Feifei (C)	25 – 29 January 1979	1.83 m (6 ft 0 in)	Bayi Kylin	(China)
C	11	Ye Li	22 – 20 November 1981	1.90 m (6 ft 3 in)	Shanghai Octopus	(China)
C	12	Chen Luyun	27 – 7 June 1977	1.88 m (6 ft 2 in)	Fujian Tailaoshan	(China)
C	13	Wang Ling	26 – 9 June 1978	1.90 m (6 ft 3 in)	Liaoning Baocheng	(China)
F	14	Ren Lei	22 – 22 January 1982	1.84 m (6 ft 0 in)	Bayi Kylin	(China)
C	15	Chen Nan	21 – 8 January 1983	1.95 m (6 ft 5 in)	Bayi Kylin	(China)

Head coach

- (China) Gong Luming

Assistant coach(es)

- (China) Chen Dechum

Legend

- (C) Team captain
- nat field describes country
  of last club
  before the tournament
- Age as of August 13, 2004

Group play

Pos	Team	Pld	W	L	PF	PA	PD	Pts	Qualification
1	United States	5	5	0	430	285	+145	10	Quarterfinals
2	Spain	5	4	1	368	334	+34	9	Quarterfinals
3	Czech Republic	5	3	2	408	375	+33	8	Quarterfinals
4	New Zealand	5	2	3	321	414	−93	7	Quarterfinals
5	China	5	1	4	360	406	−46	6	
6	South Korea	5	0	5	320	393	−73	5	

Source: FIBA archive
Rules for classification: 1) points; 2) head-to-head points; 3) head-to-head goal average; 4) head-to-head number of points scored.

14 August 2004
11:15

South Korea	54–71	China
Scoring by quarter: 15–18, 6–15, 21–24, 12–14
Pts: Beon 19; Rebs: Kim Y. 4 Asts: Lee M 2		Pts: Chen N. Rebs: Ye 8 Asts: Miao 3

Helliniko Indoor Arena, Athens
Attendance: 600
Referees:
Chantal Julien (France)
Christos Christodoulou (Greece)

16 August 2004
16:45

China	67–75	Spain
Scoring by quarter: 10–34, 19–14, 15–22, 23–5
Pts: Chen N. 18; Rebs: Chen N. 9 Asts: Song 4		Pts: Valdemoro 30; Rebs: Pascua 8 Asts: M. Fernández, Palau 5

Helliniko Indoor Arena, Athens
Attendance: 1,200
Referees:
Renato Santos (Brazil)
Scott Butler (Australia)

18 August 2004
9:00

China	83–98	Czech Republic
Scoring by quarter: 30–28, 19–21, 14–26, 20–23
Pts: Chen N. 23; Rebs: Chen N. 7 Asts: Miao, Ye 2		Pts: Veselá 22; Rebs: Veselá 7 Asts: Hamzová 8

Helliniko Indoor Arena, Athens
Attendance: 300
Referees:
Abdellilah Chlif (Morocco)
Tatiana Steigerwald (Brazil)

20 August 2004
11:15

New Zealand	79–77	China
Scoring by quarter: 21–19, 14–12, 20–24, 24–22
Pts: G. Farmer 19; Rebs: Kerr 12; Asts: Marino 4		Pts: Sui 21; Rebs: Sui 9 Asts: Wang 2

Helliniko Indoor Arena, Athens
Attendance: 345
Referees:
Elizabeth Sisk (United States)
Nancy Ethier (Canada)

22 August 2004
20:00

China	62–100	United States
Scoring by quarter: 13–27, 19–25, 13–23, 17–25
Pts: Ye 19; Rebs: Sui 6 Asts: Miao 3		Pts: Taurasi 19; Rebs: Griffith 11; Asts: Bird, Johnson 5

Helliniko Indoor Arena, Athens
Attendance: 1,653
Referees:
Vladimir Okhrimenko (Russia)
Abreu Joao (Mozambique)

Classification match (9th–10th place)

24 August 2004
11:15

9th place

Japan	63–82	China
Scoring by quarter: 12–20, 17–10, 19–21, 15–31
Pts: Kusuda, Koiso 13; Rebs: Oyama 6 Asts: Kusuda 2		Pts: Sui 25; Rebs: Wang 13; Asts: Miao 5

Helliniko Indoor Arena, Athens
Attendance: 253
Referees:
Abdellilah Chlif (Morocco)
Abreu Joao (Mozambique)

== Boxing ==
People's Republic of China sent six boxers to Athens. They won one bronze medal, with one other quarterfinalist. Their combined record was 6-6 as three boxers lost their first matches. They were in a five-way tie for 16th place in the medals board for boxing.

Athlete	Event	Round of 32	Round of 16	Quarterfinals	Semifinals	Final	
Athlete	Event	Opposition Result	Opposition Result	Opposition Result	Opposition Result	Opposition Result	Rank
Zou Shiming	Light flyweight	Warren (USA); W 22–9	Kebede (ETH); W 31–8	Nalbandyan (ARM); W 20–12	Bartelemí (CUB); L 17–29	Did not advance	3rd place, bronze medalist(s)
Liu Yuan	Bantamweight	Rigondeaux (CUB); L 7–21	Did not advance				
Chen Tongzhou	Lightweight	Khrachev (RUS); L 29–40	Did not advance				
Hanati Silamu	Welterweight	Tebazaalwa (UGA); W 29–17	Khairov (AZE); L 16–26	Did not advance			
Ha Dabateer	Middleweight	Dirrell (USA); L 18–25	Did not advance				
Lei Yuping	Light heavyweight	Yana (CMR); W 17–9	Fedchuk (UKR); W 17–9	Aripgadjiev (BLR); L 18–27	Did not advance		

== Canoeing ==
=== Slalom ===
Athlete	Event	Preliminary						Semifinal		Final			
Athlete	Event	Run 1	Rank	Run 2	Rank	Total	Rank	Time	Rank	Time	Rank	Total	Rank
Chen Fubin; Tian Qin	Men's C-2	123.64	12	125.02	11	248.66	11	Did not advance					
Li Jingjing	Women's K-1	134.07	18	125.85	19	259.92	18	Did not advance					

=== Sprint ===
Men

Athlete	Event	Heats		Semifinals		Final	
Athlete	Event	Time	Rank	Time	Rank	Time	Rank
Jing Ying	C-1 1000 m	4:05.874	6 q	4:00.684	6	Did not advance	
Liu Haitao	K-1 500 m	1:43.337	7 q	1:46.179	8	Did not advance	
Liu Haitao	K-1 1000 m	3:38.522	8	Did not advance			
Wang Bing	C-1 500 m	1:51.920	4 q	1:51.649	3 Q	1:49.903	9
Meng Guanliang; Yang Wenjun	C-2 500 m	1:38.916	1 Q	Bye		1:40.278	1st place, gold medalist(s)
Meng Guanliang; Yang Wenjun	C-2 1000 m	3:31.795	5 q	3:32.792	3 Q	3:52.926	9
Wang Lei; Yin Yijun	K-2 500 m	1:37.061	6 q	1:38.554	8	Did not advance	
Wang Lei; Yin Yijun	K-2 1000 m	3:21.279	7 q	DSQ		Did not advance	

Women

Athlete	Event	Heats		Semifinals		Final	
Athlete	Event	Time	Rank	Time	Rank	Time	Rank
Li Ting	K-1 500 m	1:55.474	4 q	1:53.598	2 Q	1:54.473	9
Xu Linbei; Zhong Hongyan	K-2 500 m	1:40.943	2 Q	Bye		1:40.913	4
Gao Yi; He Jing; Xu Linbei; Zhong Hongyan	K-4 500 m	1:34.206	3 Q	Bye		1:38.144	7

Qualification Legend: Q = Qualify to final; q = Qualify to semifinal

== Cycling ==
=== Road ===
Athlete	Event	Time	Rank
Zhang Junying	Women's road race	3:33:35	47
Qian Yunjuan	Women's road race	3:33:35	44

=== Track ===
Time trial

Athlete	Event	Time	Rank
Jiang Yonghua	Women's time trial	34.112	2nd place, silver medalist(s)

Omnium

Athlete	Event	Points	Laps	Rank
Li Meifang	Women's points race	1	0	14

=== Mountain biking ===
Athlete	Event	Time	Rank
Zhu Yongbiao	Men's cross-country	LAP (2 laps)	42
Ma Yanping	Women's cross-country	2:13:18	17

== Diving ==
Chinese divers qualified for eight individual spots at the 2004 Olympic Games. Four Chinese synchronized diving teams qualified through the 2004 FINA Diving World Cup.

Men

Athlete	Event	Preliminaries		Semifinals		Final	
Athlete	Event	Points	Rank	Points	Rank	Points	Rank
Peng Bo	3 m springboard	495.45	2 Q	751.62	2 Q	787.38	1st place, gold medalist(s)
Wang Feng	3 m springboard	444.96	7 Q	685.38	7 Q	750.72	4
Hu Jia	10 m platform	463.44	6 Q	670.74	4 Q	748.08	1st place, gold medalist(s)
Tian Liang	10 m platform	481.47	3 Q	690.51	3 Q	729.66	3rd place, bronze medalist(s)
Peng Bo; Wang Kenan	3 m synchronized springboard	—N/a				283.89	8
Tian Liang; Yang Jinghui	10 m synchronized platform	—N/a				383.88	1st place, gold medalist(s)

Women

Athlete	Event	Preliminaries		Semifinals		Final	
Athlete	Event	Points	Rank	Points	Rank	Points	Rank
Guo Jingjing	3 m springboard	319.71	3 Q	562.77	2 Q	633.15	1st place, gold medalist(s)
Wu Minxia	3 m springboard	306.96	6 Q	547.35	5 Q	612.00	2nd place, silver medalist(s)
Lao Lishi	10 m platform	348.93	4 Q	551.97	2 Q	576.30	2nd place, silver medalist(s)
Li Ting	10 m platform	339.69	7 Q	538.02	6 Q	546.48	6
Guo Jingjing; Wu Minxia	3 m synchronized springboard	—N/a				336.90	1st place, gold medalist(s)
Lao Lishi; Li Ting	10 m synchronized platform	—N/a				352.14	1st place, gold medalist(s)

== Fencing ==
Men

Athlete	Event	Round of 64	Round of 32	Round of 16	Quarterfinal	Semifinal	Final / BM	
Athlete	Event	Opposition Score	Opposition Score	Opposition Score	Opposition Score	Opposition Score	Opposition Score	Rank
Wang Lei	Individual épée	Bye	Boczkó (HUN); W 15–10	Schmid (GER); W 15–11	Strigel (GER); W 15–14	Kolobkov (RUS); W 15–10	Fischer (SUI); L 9–15	2nd place, silver medalist(s)
Xie Yongjun	Individual épée	Bye	Fernández (VEN); L 13–15	Did not advance				
Zhao Gang	Individual épée	Bye	Mahmoud (EGY); W 15–9	Fernández (VEN); L 12–15	Did not advance			
Tuo Tong; Wang Lei; Xie Yongjun; Zhao Gang	Team épée	—N/a			Germany; L 32–39	Classification semi-final United States; L 36–45	7th place final Egypt; W 45–26	7
Dong Zhaozhi	Individual foil	Bye	Le Péchoux (FRA); L 9–15	Did not advance				
Wang Haibin	Individual foil	Bye	Kruse (GBR); L 11–15	Did not advance				
Wu Hanxiong	Individual foil	Bye	Bartolillo (AUS); W 15–8	Tahoun (EGY); W 15–8	Sanzo (ITA); L 10–15	Did not advance		
Dong Zhaozhi; Wang Haibin; Wu Hanxiong; Ye Chong	Team foil	—N/a			South Korea; W 45–36	United States; W 45–36	Italy; L 45–36	2nd place, silver medalist(s)
Chen Feng	Individual sabre	Reda (ALG); W 15–3	Lapkes (BLR); L 9–15	Did not advance				
Huang Yaojiang	Individual sabre	Bernaoui (ALG); W 15–6	Nemcsik (HUN); L 12–15	Did not advance				
Zhou Hanming	Individual sabre	Dourakos (GRE); W 15–10	Covaliu (ROM); L 10–15	Did not advance				
Chen Feng; Huang Yaojiang; Wang Jingzhi; Zhou Hanming	Team sabre	—N/a			France; L 35–45	Classification semi-final Hungary; L 40–45	7th place final Greece; W 45–42	7

Women

Athlete	Event	Round of 64	Round of 32	Round of 16	Quarterfinal	Semifinal	Final / BM	
Athlete	Event	Opposition Score	Opposition Score	Opposition Score	Opposition Score	Opposition Score	Opposition Score	Rank
Li Na	Individual épée	Bye	Kavelaars (CAN); W 15–11	Kim H-j (KOR); L 9–14	Did not advance			
Shen Weiwei	Individual épée	Bye	Kiraly-Picot (FRA); L 7–11	Did not advance				
Zhang Li	Individual épée	Bye	Kazimirchuk (UKR); W 10–9	Brânză (ROM); W 15–13	Nagy (HUN); L 8–7	Did not advance		
Li Na; Shen Weiwei; Zhang Li; Zhong Weiping	Team épée	—N/a			France; L 33–45	Classification semi-final Greece; W 29–18	5th place final Hungary; W 31–32	6
Meng Jie	Individual foil	—N/a	Saïd-Guerni (ALG); W 15–12	Badea (ROM); L 11–15	Did not advance			
Tan Xue	Individual sabre	—N/a	Bye	Argiolas (FRA); W 15–11	Nechayeva (RUS); W 15–7	Jacobson (USA); W 15–12	Zagunis (USA); L 9–15	2nd place, silver medalist(s)
Zhang Ying	Individual sabre	—N/a	Benítez (VEN); W 15–9	Touya (FRA); W 15–12	Gheorghițoaia (ROM); L 13–15	Did not advance		

== Field hockey ==
=== Women's tournament ===
Roster

The following is the Chinese roster in the women's field hockey tournament of the 2004 Summer Olympics.

Head coach: Kim Chang-back

1. Nie Yali (GK)
3. Chen Zhaoxia (C)
4. Ma Yibo
5. Cheng Hui
6. Mai Shaoyan
7. Huang Junxia
8. Fu Baorong
9. Li Shuang
10. Gao Lihua
11. Tang Chunling
12. Zhou Wanfeng
15. Hou Xiaolan
16. Zhang Yimeng (GK)
17. Qiu Yingling
19. Chen Qiuqi
26. Chen Qunqing

Group play

Pos	Team	Pld	W	D	L	GF	GA	GD	Pts	Qualification
1	China	4	4	0	0	11	2	+9	12	Semi-finals
2	Argentina	4	3	0	1	12	4	+8	9	Semi-finals
3	Japan	4	2	0	2	5	7	−2	6	
4	New Zealand	4	1	0	3	3	9	−6	3	
5	Spain	4	0	0	4	3	12	−9	0	

Source: FIH
Rules for classification: 1) Points; 2) Matches won; 3) Goal difference; 4) Goals for; 5) Head-to-head result.

August 14
10:30

China	3 – 0	Japan
Fu 7'; Tang 39'; Chen Qiuqi 67'

Umpires:
Marelize de Klerk (RSA)
Renee Cohen (NED)

August 16
18:00

New Zealand	0 – 2	China
		Ma 16'; Tang 41'

Umpires:
Jean Duncan (GBR)
Soledad Iparraguirre (ARG)

August 20
08:30

China	3 – 0	Spain
Tang 14'; Fu 35'; Gao 58'

Umpires:
Sara Garnett (NZL)
Minka Woolley (AUS)

August 22
18:00

Argentina	2 – 3	China
Aymar 17', 34'		Ma 9'; Fu 16'; Tang 47'

Umpires:
Sheila Brown (RSA)
Phillipa March (AUS)

Semifinals

August 24
20:30

China	0 – 0 (a.e.t.)	Germany
Penalties
Fu (penalty shoot-out scored); Gao (penalty shoot-out missed); Mai (penalty shoot-out scored); Tang (penalty shoot-out scored); Zhou (penalty shoot-out missed)	4 – 2	(penalty shoot-out scored) Rinne; (penalty shoot-out scored) Klecker; (penalty shoot-out scored) Bachmann; (penalty shoot-out scored) Keller; (penalty shoot-out missed) Gude

Umpires:
Marelize de Klerk (RSA)
Soledad Iparraguirre (ARG)

Bronze Medal match

August 26
18:00

Argentina	1 – 0	China
Aymar 80'

Umpires:
Renee Cohen (NED)
Ute Conen (GER)

== Football ==
=== Women's tournament ===
Roster

Head coach: Zhang Haitao

China PR named a squad of 18 players and 4 alternates for the tournament.

No.	Pos.	Player	Date of birth (age)	Caps	Goals	Club
1	GK	Xiao Zhen	16 September 1976 (aged 27)			(Chinese Football Association) Sichuan Guancheng
2	DF	Jin Xiaomei	1 January 1983 (aged 21)			(Chinese Football Association) Shandong Luneng
3	DF	Li Jie	8 July 1979 (aged 25)	45	3	(Chinese Football Association) Beijing Chengjiang
4	DF	Wang Liping	12 November 1973 (aged 30)	156	6	(Chinese Football Association) Shijiazhuang Tiangong
5	DF	Fan Yunjie (captain)	29 April 1972 (aged 32)	176	16	(Chinese Football Association) Henan Jianye
6	MF	Pu Wei	20 August 1980 (aged 23)	67	20	(Chinese Football Association) Shanghai Zhongyuan
7	FW	Zhang Ouying	2 November 1975 (aged 28)	80	20	(Chinese Football Association) Shijiazhuang Tiangong
8	MF	Bi Yan	17 February 1984 (aged 20)	20	1	(Chinese Football Association) Dalian Shide
9	FW	Han Duan	15 June 1983 (aged 21)	35	20	(Chinese Football Association) Dalian Shide
10	DF	Teng Wei	21 May 1974 (aged 30)	20	12	(Chinese Football Association) Beijing Chengjiang
11	FW	Bai Lili	29 October 1978 (aged 25)			(Chinese Football Association) Shanghai Zhongyuan
12	MF	Qu Feifei	18 May 1982 (aged 22)	35	12	(Chinese Football Association) Liberation Army
13	FW	Liu Huana	17 May 1981 (aged 23)			(Chinese Football Association) Shaanxi Guoli
14	DF	Shi Dan	3 December 1980 (aged 23)			(Chinese Football Association) Liberation Army
15	DF	Ren Liping	21 October 1978 (aged 25)	40	12	(Chinese Football Association) Beijing Chengjiang
16	MF	Zhang Ying	27 June 1985 (aged 19)			(Chinese Football Association) Shanghai Zhongyuan
17	FW	Ji Ting	11 October 1982 (aged 21)			(Chinese Football Association) Shanghai Zhongyuan
18	GK	Gao Yingying	17 September 1981 (aged 22)			(Chinese Football Association) Shandong

Group play

Pos	Team	Pld	W	D	L	GF	GA	GD	Pts	Qualification
1	Germany	2	2	0	0	10	0	+10	6	Qualified for the quarterfinals
2	Mexico	2	0	1	1	1	3	−2	1	Qualified for the quarterfinals
3	China	2	0	1	1	1	9	−8	1	

August 11, 2004
18:00

Germany	8 – 0	China
Prinz 13', 21', 73', 88'; Wunderlich 65'; Lingor 76' (pen.); Pohlers 82'; Müller 90'	Report

Pampeloponnisiako Stadium, Patras
Attendance: 14.657
Referee: Seitz (USA)
August 14, 2004
18:00

China	1 – 1	Mexico
Ji 34'	Report	Domínguez 11'

Pampeloponnisiako Stadium, Patras
Attendance: 5.112
Referee: Ionescu (Romania)

== Gymnastics ==
=== Artistic ===
Men
Team

Athlete	Event	Qualification								Final							
Athlete	Event	Apparatus						Total	Rank	Apparatus						Total	Rank
Athlete	Event	F	PH	R	V	PB	HB	Total	Rank	F	PH	R	V	PB	HB	Total	Rank
Huang Xu	Team	—N/a	9.737 Q	9.712	—N/a	9.675	9.637	—N/a		—N/a	9.675	9.712	—N/a		9.687	—N/a	
Li Xiaopeng	Team	—N/a		9.112	9.800 Q	9.787 Q	—N/a			—N/a		9.662	9.700	9.812	—N/a		
Teng Haibin	Team	9.350	9.800 Q	—N/a	9.487	6.775	9.687	—N/a		8.662	9.762	—N/a		8.737	9.125	—N/a	
Xiao Qin	Team	9.125	9.337	—N/a	9.237	9.525	9.750 Q	—N/a		—N/a	9.862	—N/a					
Xing Aowei	Team	9.637	9.650	8.925	9.600	—N/a	9.687	—N/a		9.087	—N/a		9.400	—N/a	9.725	—N/a	
Yang Wei	Team	9.412	9.525	9.712	9.550	9.625	9.550	57.374	7 Q	9.562	—N/a	9.637	9.725	9.725	—N/a		
Total	Team	37.524	38.712	37.461	38.437	38.612	38.761	229.507	4 Q	27.311	29.299	29.011	28.825	28.274	28.537	171.257	5

Individual finals

Athlete	Event	Apparatus						Total	Rank
Athlete	Event	F	PH	R	V	PB	HB	Total	Rank
Huang Xu	Pommel horse	—N/a	9.775	—N/a				9.775	4
Li Xiaopeng	Vault	—N/a			9.368	—N/a		9.368	7
Li Xiaopeng	Parallel bars	—N/a				9.762	—N/a	9.762	3rd place, bronze medalist(s)
Teng Haibin	Pommel horse	—N/a	9.837	—N/a				9.837	1st place, gold medalist(s)
Xiao Qin	Horizontal bar	—N/a					9.737	9.737	6
Yang Wei	All-around	9.600	9.725	9.737	9.512	9.800	8.987	57.361	7

Women
Team

Athlete	Event	Qualification						Final					
Athlete	Event	Apparatus				Total	Rank	Apparatus				Total	Rank
Athlete	Event	V	UB	BB	F	Total	Rank	V	UB	BB	F	Total	Rank
Cheng Fei	Team	9.375	—N/a	8.925	9.650 Q	—N/a		9.475	—N/a		9.662	—N/a	
Fan Ye	Team	—N/a	9.600	9.437	8.975	—N/a		—N/a	8.537	9.337	—N/a		
Li Ya	Team	9.137	9.675 Q	9.600 Q	—N/a			—N/a	9.450	8.300	—N/a		
Lin Li	Team	8.937	9.700 Q	—N/a	8.600	—N/a		—N/a	9.562	—N/a			
Wang Tiantian	Team	9.400 Q	9.512	9.262	9.475	37.649	9 Q	9.362	—N/a		8.637	—N/a	
Zhang Nan	Team	9.287	9.525	9.550 Q	9.437	37.799	6 Q	9.312	—N/a	9.587	8.787	—N/a	
Total	Team	37.199	38.500	37.849	37.537	151.085	3 Q	28.149	27.549	27.224	27.086	110.008	7

Individual finals

Athlete	Event	Apparatus				Total	Rank
Athlete	Event	V	UB	BB	F	Total	Rank
Cheng Fei	Floor	—N/a			9.412	9.412	4
Li Ya	Uneven bars	—N/a	9.562	—N/a		9.562	5
Li Ya	Balance beam	—N/a		9.050	—N/a	9.050	7
Lin Li	Uneven bars	—N/a	9.200	—N/a		9.200	7
Wang Tiantian	All-around	9.537	8.725	9.162	9.375	36.799	13
Wang Tiantian	Vault	9.081	—N/a			9.081	7
Zhang Nan	All-around	9.462	9.662	9.600	9.325	38.049	3rd place, bronze medalist(s)
Zhang Nan	Balance beam	—N/a		9.237	—N/a	9.237	6

=== Rhythmic ===
Athlete	Event	Qualification						Final					
Athlete	Event	Hoop	Ball	Clubs	Ribbon	Total	Rank	Hoop	Ball	Clubs	Ribbon	Total	Rank
Zhong Ling	Individual	20.875	22.400	22.950	22.400	88.625	17	Did not advance					

Athlete	Event	Qualification				Final			
Athlete	Event	5 ribbons	3 hoops 2 balls	Total	Rank	5 ribbons	3 hoops 2 balls	Total	Rank
Dai Yongjun; Hu Mei; Li Jia; Lu Yingna; Lü Yuanyang; Zhang Shuo	Team	22.300	23.800	46.100	5 Q	23.100	23.400	46.500	6

=== Trampoline ===
Athlete	Event	Qualification		Final	
Athlete	Event	Score	Rank	Score	Rank
Mu Yongfeng	Men's	65.20	10	Did not advance	
Huang Shanshan	Women's	65.40	4 Q	39.00	3rd place, bronze medalist(s)

== Handball ==
=== Women's tournament ===
Roster

The following is the China roster in the women's handball tournament of the 2004 Summer Olympics.

Head coaches: Chung Hyungkyun

No.	Pos.	Name	Date of birth (age)	Height	App.	Goals	Club
1	GK	Fan Jie	25 October 1976 (aged 27)	1.76 m			(China) Beijing Handball Club
2	CB	Zhai Chao	14 December 1971 (aged 32)	1.78 m			(Denmark) Viborg HK
3	P	Liu Yun	6 March 1982 (aged 22)	1.80 m			(China) Anhui Handball Club
5	CB	Li Bing	21 January 1980 (aged 24)	1.81 m			(China) Beijing Army
6	LB	Zhang Zhiqing	14 October 1981 (aged 22)	1.80 m			(China) Guangdong Handball Club
8	LW	Zhang Li	4 October 1976 (aged 27)	1.72 m			(China) Beijing Handball Club
9	RB	Wang Min	14 June 1980 (aged 24)	1.74 m			(China) Shanghai Handball Club
10	LB	Wang Shasha	1 August 1987 (aged 17)	1.76 m			(China) Shangdong Handball Club
11	P	Chen Ji	5 December 1976 (aged 27)	1.75 m			(China) Shanghai Handball Club
13	LW	Wu Yanan	14 September 1981 (aged 22)	1.73 m			(China) Beijing Army
14	RB	Liu Xiaomei	2 May 1985 (aged 19)	1.78 m			(China) Anhui Handball Club
15	RW	Sun Laimiao	8 April 1981 (aged 23)	1.76 m			(China) Anhui Handball Club
16	GK	Yu Geli	28 April 1976 (aged 28)	1.81 m			(China) Beijing Army
17	RW	Lei Sufen	5 June 1979 (aged 25)	1.71 m			(China) Guangdong Handball Club
19	LB	Li Weiwei	7 July 1982 (aged 22)	1.78 m			(China) Beijing Army

Group play

Pos	Team	Pld	W	D	L	GF	GA	GD	Pts	Qualification
1	Ukraine	4	4	0	0	99	82	+17	8	Quarterfinals
2	Hungary	4	3	0	1	118	93	+25	6	Quarterfinals
3	China	4	2	0	2	106	90	+16	4	Quarterfinals
4	Brazil	4	1	0	3	97	105	−8	2	Quarterfinals
5	Greece (H)	4	0	0	4	74	124	−50	0	

Rules for classification: 1) Points; 2) Head-to-head points; 3) Head-to-head goal difference; 4) Head-to-head goals scored; 5) Goal difference; 6) Goals scored; 7) Draw.
(H) Hosts

15 August 2004; 14:30	China	24 – 28	Hungary	Sports Pavilion; Referees: Aly Hassan, Yasser (EGY)
15 August 2004; 14:30	Li Weiwei 8	(11-14)	Kulcsár, Radulović 8	Sports Pavilion; Referees: Aly Hassan, Yasser (EGY)
15 August 2004; 14:30	4× (yellow card) 11× (suspension)		3× (yellow card) 11× (suspension)	Sports Pavilion; Referees: Aly Hassan, Yasser (EGY)

17 August 2004; 14:30	Ukraine	26 – 21	China	Sports Pavilion; Referees: Breto, Huelin Trillo (ESP)
17 August 2004; 14:30	Rayhel 9	(15-10)	Li Weiwei 7	Sports Pavilion; Referees: Breto, Huelin Trillo (ESP)
17 August 2004; 14:30	3× (yellow card) 5× (suspension)		3× (yellow card) 4× (suspension)	Sports Pavilion; Referees: Breto, Huelin Trillo (ESP)

19 August 2004; 16:30	Greece	13 – 33	China	Sports Pavilion; Referees: Bord, Buy (FRA)
19 August 2004; 16:30	Gioupi, Psatha, Sousa 3	(6 – 15)	Zhai 7	Sports Pavilion; Referees: Bord, Buy (FRA)
19 August 2004; 16:30	3× (yellow card) 7× (suspension)		2× (yellow card) 4× (suspension)	Sports Pavilion; Referees: Bord, Buy (FRA)

23 August 2004; 16:30	China	28 - 23	Brazil	Sports Pavilion, Athens; Referees: Boye, Jensen (DEN)
23 August 2004; 16:30	Zhai Chao 10	(11-13)	Nascimento 5	Sports Pavilion, Athens; Referees: Boye, Jensen (DEN)
23 August 2004; 16:30	3× (yellow card) 3× (suspension)		3× (yellow card) 4× (suspension)	Sports Pavilion, Athens; Referees: Boye, Jensen (DEN)

Quarterfinal

26 August 2004; 21:30	China	28 – 32	Denmark	Helliniko Indoor Arena; Referees: Pozeznik, Repensek (SLO)
26 August 2004; 21:30	Wang Shasha 7	(14-18)	Fruelund 7	Helliniko Indoor Arena; Referees: Pozeznik, Repensek (SLO)
26 August 2004; 21:30	4× (yellow card) 5× (suspension)		2× (yellow card) 3× (suspension)	Helliniko Indoor Arena; Referees: Pozeznik, Repensek (SLO)

5th-8th Place Classification

28 August 2004; 09:30	Spain	27 – 23	China	Helliniko Indoor Arena; Referees: Aly Hassan, Yasser (EGY)
28 August 2004; 09:30	García, Puche 5	(16-10)	Wang Shasha 7	Helliniko Indoor Arena; Referees: Aly Hassan, Yasser (EGY)
28 August 2004; 09:30	4× (yellow card) 2× (suspension)		3× (yellow card) 1× (suspension)	Helliniko Indoor Arena; Referees: Aly Hassan, Yasser (EGY)

7th-8th Place Final

29 August 2004; 08:30	China	25 – 26	Brazil	Helliniko Indoor Arena; Referees: Breto, Huelin Trillo (ESP)
29 August 2004; 08:30	Li Weiwei 7	(10-13)	Silva 6	Helliniko Indoor Arena; Referees: Breto, Huelin Trillo (ESP)
29 August 2004; 08:30	4× (yellow card) 2× (suspension)		3× (yellow card) 3× (suspension)	Helliniko Indoor Arena; Referees: Breto, Huelin Trillo (ESP)

== Judo ==
Nine Chinese judoka (two men and seven women) qualified for the 2004 Summer Olympics.

Men

Athlete	Event	Round of 32	Round of 16	Quarterfinals	Semifinals	Repechage 1	Repechage 2	Repechage 3	Final / BM	
Athlete	Event	Opposition Result	Opposition Result	Opposition Result	Opposition Result	Opposition Result	Opposition Result	Opposition Result	Opposition Result	Rank
Xie Jianhua	−73 kg	Fernandes (FRA); L 0102–0210	Did not advance							
Pan Song	+100 kg	Eitel (POL); W 1001–0000	Rybak (BLR); L 0000–0210	Did not advance						

Women

Athlete	Event	Round of 32	Round of 16	Quarterfinals	Semifinals	Repechage 1	Repechage 2	Repechage 3	Final / BM	
Athlete	Event	Opposition Result	Opposition Result	Opposition Result	Opposition Result	Opposition Result	Opposition Result	Opposition Result	Opposition Result	Rank
Gao Feng	−48 kg	Polzin (BRA); W 1110–0000	Macrì (ITA); W 1011–0000	Jossinet (FRA); L 0011–0102	Did not advance	Bye	Moskvina (BLR); W 0200–0000	Ye G-R (KOR); W 0002–0001	Dumitru (ROM); W 1010–0110	3rd place, bronze medalist(s)
Xian Dongmei	−52 kg	Bye	Souakri (ALG); W 0001–0000	Imbriani (GER); W 0221–0010	Euranie (FRA); W 1001–0010	Bye			Yokosawa (JPN); W 1000–0000	1st place, gold medalist(s)
Liu Yuxiang	−57 kg	Latrous (ALG); W 1100–0011	Zangrando (BRA); L 0011–1000	Did not advance						
Li Shufang	−63 kg	Bye	Chisholm (CAN); L 0000–0010	Did not advance						
Qin Dongya	−70 kg	Ouerdane (ALG); W 0110–0010	Böhm (GER); L 1011–0001	Did not advance		Bye	Roberge (CAN); W 1001–0000	Blanco (ESP); W 1002–0000	Arlove (AUS); W 0202–0000	3rd place, bronze medalist(s)
Liu Xia	−78 kg	Zwiers (NED); W 1000–0111	Moskalyuk (RUS); W 0120–0000	Laborde (CUB); W 1001–0000	Matrosova (UKR); W 0001–0000	Bye			Anno (JPN); L 1010–0001	2nd place, silver medalist(s)
Sun Fuming	+78 kg	Bye	Yahyaoui (TUN); W 1010–0000	Chalá (ECU); W 1000–0000	Beltrán (CUB); L 0000–1000	Bye			Prokofyeva (UKR); W 1000–0000	3rd place, bronze medalist(s)

== Modern pentathlon ==
Three Chinese athletes qualified to compete in the modern pentathlon event through the Asian Championships.

Athlete	Event	Shooting (10 m air pistol)			Fencing (épée one touch)			Swimming (200 m freestyle)			Riding (show jumping)			Running (3000 m)			Total points	Final rank
Athlete	Event	Points	Rank	MP Points	Results	Rank	MP points	Time	Rank	MP points	Penalties	Rank	MP points	Time	Rank	MP Points	Total points	Final rank
Qian Zhenhua	Men's	185	2	1156	12–19	=26	720	2:08.52	16	1260	56	3	1144	11:08.25	29	892	5172	16
Dong Lean	Women's	189	1	1204	13–18	=22	748	2:21.67	15	1220	300	30	900	11:58.05	25	848	4920	24
Liang Caixia	Women's	158	28	832	12–19	=26	720	2:20.93	12	1232	240	28	960	11:43.01	24	908	4652	29

== Rowing ==
Chinese rowers qualified the following boats:

Men

Athlete	Event	Heats		Repechage		Semifinals		Final	
Athlete	Event	Time	Rank	Time	Rank	Time	Rank	Time	Rank
Hui Su	Single sculls	7:23.19	4 R	6:57.77	2 SA/B/C	7:10.33	6 FC	6:57.42	15
Yang Jian; Zhu Zhifu	Lightweight double sculls	6:22.64	4 R	6:31.87	4 SC/D	6:25.97	3 FC	6:58.88	17

Women

Athlete	Event	Heats		Repechage		Semifinals		Final	
Athlete	Event	Time	Rank	Time	Rank	Time	Rank	Time	Rank
Mu Suli	Single sculls	7:58.92	3 R	7:48.09	3 SC/D	7:48.54	2 FC	7:39.64	13
Cong Huanling; Feng Xueling	Pair	7:53.30	4 R	7:15.52	3 FB	—N/a		7:10.54	7
Li Qian; Xu Dongxiang	Lightweight double sculls	6:54.66	2 R	6:54.48	1 SA/B	6:55.66	3 FA	7:02.05	5
Cheng Ran; Gao Yanhua; Jin Ziwei; Luo Xiuhua; Wu You; Yan Xiaoxia; Yang Cuiping; Yu Fei; Zheng Na	Eight	6:06.20	2 R	6:09.87	4 FA	—N/a		6:21.71	4

Qualification Legend: FA=Final A (medal); FB=Final B (non-medal); FC=Final C (non-medal); FD=Final D (non-medal); FE=Final E (non-medal); FF=Final F (non-medal); SA/B=Semifinals A/B; SC/D=Semifinals C/D; SE/F=Semifinals E/F; R=Repechage

== Sailing ==
Chinese sailors have qualified one boat for each of the following events.

Men

Athlete	Event	Race											Net points	Final rank
Athlete	Event	1	2	3	4	5	6	7	8	9	10	M*	Net points	Final rank
Zhou Yuanguo	Mistral	19	9	~~21~~	3	8	1	11	4	12	14	3	84	7

Women

Athlete	Event	Race											Net points	Final rank
Athlete	Event	1	2	3	4	5	6	7	8	9	10	M*	Net points	Final rank
Yin Jian	Mistral	~~11~~	6	2	6	4	1	1	1	2	9	1	33	2nd place, silver medalist(s)
Shen Xiaoying	Europe	11	20	3	2	12	7	20	~~OCS~~	6	2	5	88	7

Open

Athlete	Event	Race											Net points	Final rank
Athlete	Event	1	2	3	4	5	6	7	8	9	10	M*	Net points	Final rank
Chi Qiang	Laser	29	28	4	37	22	29	~~36~~	17	28	23	35	251	31

M = Medal race; OCS = On course side of the starting line; DSQ = Disqualified; DNF = Did not finish; DNS= Did not start; RDG = Redress given

== Shooting ==
Twenty-six Chinese shooters (fifteen men and eleven women) qualified to compete in the following events:

Men

Athlete	Event	Qualification		Final	
Athlete	Event	Points	Rank	Points	Rank
Chen Yongqiang	25 m rapid fire pistol	586	6 Q	683.8	6
Geng Hongbin	10 m running target	572	11	Did not advance	
Hu Binyuan	Double trap	134	6 Q	177	4
Jia Zhanbo	50 m rifle prone	595	7 Q	696.6	8
Jia Zhanbo	50 m rifle 3 positions	1171	1 Q	1264.5	1st place, gold medalist(s)
Jin Di	Skeet	120	=15	Did not advance	
Li Jie^{1}	10 m air rifle	598	2 Q	701.3	2nd place, silver medalist(s)
Li Jie^{2}	10 m running target	579	3 Q	675.8	6
Liu Zhiwei	50 m rifle 3 positions	1157	=19	Did not advance	
Tan Zongliang	10 m air pistol	582	9	Did not advance	
Tan Zongliang	50 m pistol	558	=10	Did not advance	
Wang Yifu	10 m air pistol	590	2 Q	690.0 OR	1st place, gold medalist(s)
Wang Zheng	Double trap	137	3 Q	178	3rd place, bronze medalist(s)
Xu Dan	50 m pistol	553	=18	Did not advance	
Yao Ye	50 m rifle prone	590	=32	Did not advance	
Zhang Penghui	25 m rapid fire pistol	585	7	Did not advance	
Zhu Qinan	10 m air rifle	599 OR	1 Q	702.7 WR	1st place, gold medalist(s)

Women

Athlete	Event	Qualification		Final	
Athlete	Event	Points	Rank	Points	Rank
Cao Ying	25 m pistol	578	=10	Did not advance	
Chen Ying	25 m pistol	584	4 Q	686.2	4
Du Li	10 m air rifle	398	2 Q	502.0 OR	1st place, gold medalist(s)
Gao E	Trap	48	17	Did not advance	
Gao E	Double trap	107	5 Q	142*	3rd place, bronze medalist(s)
Li Qingnian	Double trap	107	6 Q	142	4
Ren Jie	10 m air pistol	384	6 Q	482.3	4
Tao Luna	10 m air pistol	366	=38	Did not advance	
Wang Chengyi	50 m rifle 3 positions	584	4 Q	685.4	3rd place, bronze medalist(s)
Wei Ning	Skeet	70	3 Q	93	2nd place, silver medalist(s)
Wu Liuxi	50 m rifle 3 positions	578	=9	Did not advance	
Zhao Yinghui	10 m air rifle	398	4 Q	500.8	4

* = Won in shoot-off

== Softball ==
In the final game of the preliminary round, China was the victim of the first perfect game in Olympic softball history, losing to Japan 2–0. Their defeat two days later in the semifinal, again to Japan, eliminated China from medal contention.

Position	No.	Player	Birth	Club in 2004
P	4	Lu Wei	JUN/21/1983
IF	5	Deng Xiaoling	AUG/26/1974	Sichuan
P	7	Li Qi	OCT/30/1983	Dalian
C	8	Mi Renrong	SEP/07/1977
IF	9	Wang Xiaoyan	NOV/13/1970	Zhengzhou City
IF	10	Zhang Ai	SEP/23/1981	Shanghai Sports School
OF	11	Mu Xia	APR/08/1974	Tianjin
IF	12	Wu Di	MAR/01/1982
P	15	Wei Qiang	APR/25/1972	Beijing
IF	18	Li Chunxia	MAR/04/1977
OF	19	Zhou Yi	JUL/20/1983	Chengdu City
P	21	Zhang Lixia	JAN/25/1977	Lanzhou
OF	23	Luo Lin	APR/06/1979
IF	25	Tao Hua	DEC/12/1972	Shanghai
C	29	Guo Jia	SEP/24/1980	Changsha
Bench Coaches
Team; Manager		Treshan McDonald	FEB/10/1959
Coach		Xu Fumin	AUG/11/1954
Coach		Chen Wenyuan	JAN/15/1963

Preliminary Round

Team	W	L	RS	RA	WIN%	Tiebreaker
United States	7	0	41	0	1.000	-
Australia	6	1	22	14	.857	-
Japan	4	3	17	8	.571	-
China	3	4	15	20	.429	1–0
Canada	3	4	6	14	.429	0–1
Chinese Taipei	2	5	3	13	.286	1–0
Greece	2	5	6	24	.286	0–1
Italy	1	6	8	24	.143	-

August 14 19:30 at Helliniko Softball Stadium
Team	1	2	3	4	5	6	7	R	H	E
Greece	0	0	0	0	0	0	0	0	2	6
China	0	1	1	0	3	0	X	5	5	1
WP: Lü Wei(1–0) LP: Sarah Farnworth(0–1)

August 15 12:00 at Helliniko Softball Stadium
Team	1	2	3	4	5	6	7	R	H	E
Italy	0	6	0	0	0	0	1	7	9	3
China	0	0	0	0	5	0	0	5	5	1
WP: Jennifer Spediacci(1–0) LP: Li Qi(0–1)

August 16 9:30 at Helliniko Softball Stadium
Team	1	2	3	4	5	6	7	R	H	E
China	0	0	0	0	0	4	0	4	4	0
Canada	0	0	0	2	0	0	0	2	4	2
WP: Zhang Lixia(1–0) LP: Lauren Bay(1–1)

August 17 9:30 at Helliniko Softball Stadium
Team	1	2	3	4	5	6	7	R	H	E
China	0	0	0	0	0	0	2	0	1	1
United States	2	1	0	0	1	0	X	4	5	1
WP: Lori Harrigan(1–0) LP: Zhang Lixia(1–1); Home runs: CHN: None; USA: Crystl Bustos in 5th, 1 RBI

August 18 12:00 at Helliniko Softball Stadium
Team	1	2	3	4	5	6	7	R	H	E
Australia	0	0	0	0	0	0	5	5	4	0
China	0	0	0	0	0	0	0	0	1	2
WP: Melanie Roche(2–0) LP: Lü Wei(1–1)

August 19 9:30 at Helliniko Softball Stadium
Team	1	2	3	4	5	6	7	R	H	E
Chinese Taipei	0	0	0	0	0	0	0	0	1	2
China	0	0	0	0	1	0	X	1	4	0
WP: Lü Wei(2–1) LP: Lai Sheng-Jung(1–1)

August 20 19:30 at Helliniko Softball Stadium
Team	1	2	3	4	5	6	7	R	H	E
China	0	0	0	0	0	0	0	0	0	0
Japan	0	0	0	0	1	1	X	2	8	0
WP: Yukiko Ueno(1–2) LP: Lü Wei(2–2)

Quarterfinal

August 22 12:20 at Helliniko Softball Stadium
Team	1	2	3	4	5	6	7	8	R	H	E
Japan	0	0	0	0	0	0	0	1	1	6	0
China	0	0	0	0	0	0	0	0	0	3	4
WP: Yukiko Ueno(2–2) LP: Lü Wei(2–3)

== Swimming ==
Chinese swimmers earned qualifying standards in the following events (up to a maximum of 2 swimmers in each event at the A-standard time, and 1 at the B-standard time):

Men

Athlete	Event	Heat		Semifinal		Final	
Athlete	Event	Time	Rank	Time	Rank	Time	Rank
Chen Zuo	50 m freestyle	23.41	42	Did not advance			
Huang Shaohua	100 m freestyle	55.46	60	Did not advance			
Lai Zhongjian	200 m breaststroke	2:14.61	15 Q	2:14.94	14	Did not advance	
Liu Weijia	400 m individual medley	4:27.02	28	—N/a		Did not advance	
Ouyang Kunpeng	100 m backstroke	55.50	10 Q	55.28	11	Did not advance	
Wang Haibo	100 m breaststroke	1:03.54	30	Did not advance			
Wu Peng	100 m butterfly	55.17	43	Did not advance			
Wu Peng	200 m butterfly	1:57.96	5 Q	1:56.81	5 Q	1:56.28	6
Wu Peng	200 m individual medley	2:03.60	24	Did not advance			
Wu Peng	400 m individual medley	4:19.32	14	—N/a		Did not advance	
Xin Tong	1500 m freestyle	16:10.43	33	—N/a		Did not advance	
Yu Rui	200 m backstroke	2:04.51	30	Did not advance			
Zhang Lin	200 m freestyle	1:53.84	43	Did not advance			
Zhang Lin	400 m freestyle	3:56.65	26	—N/a		Did not advance	
Zhao Tao	200 m individual medley	2:02.41	19	Did not advance			
Chen Zuo; Huang Shaohua; Liu Weijia; Zheng Kunliang	4 × 100 m freestyle relay	3:24.31	15	—N/a		Did not advance	
Chen Zuo; Huang Shaohua; Liu Yu; Zheng Kunliang	4 × 200 m freestyle relay	7:22.87	10	—N/a		Did not advance	

Women

Athlete	Event	Heat		Semifinal		Final	
Athlete	Event	Time	Rank	Time	Rank	Time	Rank
Chen Hua	400 m freestyle	4:12.67	17	—N/a		Did not advance	
Chen Hua	800 m freestyle	8:36.24	11	—N/a		Did not advance	
Chen Xiujun	200 m backstroke	DSQ		Did not advance			
Cheng Jiaru	100 m freestyle	56.39	22	Did not advance			
Gao Chang	100 m backstroke	1:02.19	15 Q	1:02.17	15	Did not advance	
Li Jie	200 m butterfly	2:11.77	11 Q	2:13.41	16	Did not advance	
Luo Xuejuan	100 m breaststroke	1:09.07	6 Q	1:08.57	7 Q	1:06.64 OR	1st place, gold medalist(s)
Luo Xuejuan	200 m breaststroke	DNS		Did not advance			
Pang Jiaying	200 m freestyle	2:00.80	14 Q	1:58.68 NR	3 Q	1:59.16	7
Pang Jiaying	400 m freestyle	4:11.81	14	—N/a		Did not advance	
Qi Hui	100 m breaststroke	1:09.29	7 Q	1:09.06	8 Q	DSQ	
Qi Hui	200 m breaststroke	2:28.66	10 Q	2:26.75	7 Q	2:26.35	6
Qi Hui	200 m individual medley	2:26.02	29	Did not advance			
Xu Yanwei	100 m freestyle	56.66	25	Did not advance			
Xu Yanwei	100 m butterfly	1:01.53	28	Did not advance			
Yang Yu	200 m freestyle	2:01.33	16 Q	2:00.52	15	Did not advance	
Zhan Shu	100 m backstroke	1:02.39	16 Q	1:02.10	14	Did not advance	
Zhan Shu	200 m backstroke	2:31.56	33	Did not advance			
Zhang Tianyi	400 m individual medley	DSQ		—N/a		Did not advance	
Zhou Yafei	100 m butterfly	59.62	12 Q	59.48	12	Did not advance	
Zhou Yafei	200 m individual medley	2:15.56	8 Q	2:15.93	14	Did not advance	
Zhu Yingwen	50 m freestyle	26.45	32	Did not advance			
Cheng Jiaru; Xu Yanwei; Yang Yu; Zhu Yingwen	4 × 100 m freestyle relay	3:42.84	8 Q	—N/a		3:42.90	8
Li Ji*; Pang Jiaying; Xu Yanwei; Yang Yu; Zhu Yingwen	4 × 200 m freestyle relay	8:05.38	6 Q	—N/a		7:55.97 AS	2nd place, silver medalist(s)
Chen Xiujun; Luo Xuejuan; Qi Hui*; Zhan Shu*; Zhou Yafei; Zhu Yingwen	4 × 100 m medley relay	4:05.97	5 Q	—N/a		4:03.35	4

*Competed only in heats and received medals

== Synchronized swimming ==
Nine Chinese synchronized swimmers qualified a spot in the women's team.

Athlete	Event	Technical routine		Free routine (preliminary)			Free routine (final)		
Athlete	Event	Points	Rank	Points	Total (technical + free)	Rank	Points	Total (technical + free)	Rank
Gu Beibei; Zhang Xiaohuan	Duet	46.584	7	46.750	93.334	8 Q	47.084	93.668	7
Chen Yu; Gu Beibei; He Xiaochu; Hou Yingli; Hu Ni; Li Zhen; Wang Na; Zhang Xiaohuan	Team	47.084	6	—N/a			47.500	94.584	6

== Table tennis ==
Nine Chinese table tennis players qualified for the following events.

Men

Athlete	Event	Round 1	Round 2	Round 3	Round 4	Quarterfinals	Semifinals	Final / BM	
Athlete	Event	Opposition Result	Opposition Result	Opposition Result	Opposition Result	Opposition Result	Opposition Result	Opposition Result	Rank
Ma Lin	Singles	Bye		Primorac (CRO); W 4–1	Waldner (SWE); L 1–4	Did not advance			
Wang Hao	Singles	Bye		Roßkopf (GER); W 4–1	Lin (DOM); W 4–1	Chuang C-Y (TPE); W 4–2	Wang Lq (CHN); W 4–1	Ryu S-M (KOR); L 2–4	2nd place, silver medalist(s)
Wang Liqin	Singles	Bye		Keen (NED); W 4–1	Joo S-H (KOR); W 4–1	Ko L C (HKG); W 4–1	Wang H (CHN); L 1–4	Waldner (SWE); W 4–1	3rd place, bronze medalist(s)
Chen Qi; Ma Lin	Doubles	—N/a	Bye		Heister / Keen (NED); W 4–2	Błaszczyk / Krzeszewski (POL); W 4–1	Maze / Tugwell (DEN); W 4–2	Ko L C / Li C (HKG); W 4–2	1st place, gold medalist(s)
Kong Linghui; Wang Hao	Doubles	—N/a	Bye		Persson / Waldner (SWE); L 1–4	Did not advance			

Women

Athlete	Event	Round 1	Round 2	Round 3	Round 4	Quarterfinals	Semifinals	Final / BM	
Athlete	Event	Opposition Result	Opposition Result	Opposition Result	Opposition Result	Opposition Result	Opposition Result	Opposition Result	Rank
Niu Jianfeng	Singles	Bye		Schall (GER); W 4–3	Kim H-M (PRK); L 0–4	Did not advance			
Wang Nan	Singles	Bye		Kim Y-M (PRK); W 4–2	Zamfir (ROM); W 4–1	Li Jw (SIN); L 1–4	Did not advance		
Zhang Yining	Singles	Bye		Li Cl (NZL); W 4–0	Lau S-F (HKG); W 4–1	Boroš (CRO); W 4–0	Kim K-A (KOR); W 4–1	Kim H-M (PRK); W 4–0	1st place, gold medalist(s)
Guo Yue; Niu Jianfeng	Doubles	Bye			Huang I-H / Lu Y-F (TPE); W 4–0	Fujinuma / Umemura (JPN); W 4–2	Wang N / Zhang Yn (CHN); L 2–4	Kim B-R / Kim K-A (KOR); W 4–3	3rd place, bronze medalist(s)
Wang Nan; Zhang Yining	Doubles	Bye			Stefanova / Tan Wl (ITA); W 4–0	Song A S / Tie Y N (HKG); W 4–2	Guo Y / Niu Jf (CHN); W 4–2	Lee E-S / Seok E-M (KOR); W 4–0	1st place, gold medalist(s)

== Taekwondo ==
Two Chinese taekwondo jin qualified for the following events.

Athlete	Event	Round of 16	Quarterfinals	Semifinals	Repechage 1	Repechage 2	Final / BM	
Athlete	Event	Opposition Result	Opposition Result	Opposition Result	Opposition Result	Opposition Result	Opposition Result	Rank
Luo Wei	Women's −67 kg	Hwang K-S (KOR); W 10–8	Solheim (NOR); W RSC	Díaz (PUR); W 5–3	Bye		Mystakidou (GRE); W 7–6	1st place, gold medalist(s)
Chen Zhong	Women's +67 kg	Okamoto (JPN); W 7–5	Carmona (VEN); W 7–5	Falavigna (BRA); W 8–5	Bye		Baverel (FRA); W 12–5	1st place, gold medalist(s)

== Tennis ==
China won its first Olympic tennis medal, a gold, in the women's doubles. Following this victory, China became the only nation to claim gold medals in all three Olympic racquet sports (badminton, table tennis, tennis), and more importantly, to capture the gold medal in the women's doubles for all of these events.

Athlete	Event	Round of 64	Round of 32	Round of 16	Quarterfinals	Semifinals	Final / BM	
Athlete	Event	Opposition Score	Opposition Score	Opposition Score	Opposition Score	Opposition Score	Opposition Score	Rank
Zheng Jie	Women's singles	Sugiyama (JPN); L 6–4, 3–6, 6–8	Did not advance					
Li Ting; Sun Tiantian	Women's doubles	—N/a	Rubin / Williams (USA); W 7–5, 1–6, 6–3	Elia / Schiavone (ITA); W 6–1, 7–6^{(7–1)}	Molik / Stubbs (AUS); W 6–3, 6–2	Suárez / Tarabini (ARG); W 6–2, 2–6, 9–7	Martínez / Ruano Pascual (ESP); W 6–3, 6–3	1st place, gold medalist(s)
Yan Zi; Zheng Jie	Women's doubles	—N/a	Matevžič / Pisnik (SLO); W 6–2, 6–1	Casanova / Schnyder (SUI); W 6–3, 6–3	Martínez / Ruano Pascual (ESP); L 1–6, 1–6	Did not advance		

== Triathlon ==
Two Chinese triathletes qualified for the following events.

Athlete	Event	Swim (1.5 km)	Trans 1	Bike (40 km)	Trans 2	Run (10 km)	Total Time	Rank
Wang Hongni	Women's	20:39	0:18	1:16:08	0:21	41:41	2:18:40.07	40
Xing Lin	Women's	19:49	0:20	Lapped				

== Volleyball ==
=== Beach ===
Athlete	Event	Preliminary round	Standing	Round of 16	Quarterfinals	Semifinals	Final	
Athlete	Event	Opposition Score	Standing	Opposition Score	Opposition Score	Opposition Score	Opposition Score	Rank
Tian Jia; Wang Fei	Women's	Pool F Lochowicz – Pottharst (AUS); L 0 – 2 (18–21, 18–21); García – Gaxiola (MEX); W 2 – 0 (21–19, 21–15); Karantasiou – Sfyri (GRE); L 0 – 2 (14–21, 17–21)	3 Q	May – Walsh (USA); L 0 – 2 (11–21, 18–21)	Did not advance			
Wang Lu; You Wenhui	Women's	Pool E Pohl – Rau (GER); L 0 – 2 (17–21, 18–21); Cook – Sanderson (AUS); L 1 – 2 (19–21, 21–17, 15–17); P Yanchulova – T Yanchulova (BUL); L 0 – 2 (19–21, 17–21)	4	Did not advance				

=== Indoor ===
==== Women's tournament ====
Summary

Team	Event	Group stage						Quarterfinals	Semifinals	Final / BM	
Team	Event	Opposition Score	Opposition Score	Opposition Score	Opposition Score	Opposition Score	Rank	Opposition Score	Opposition Score	Opposition Score	Rank
China women's	Women's tournament	United States; W 3–1	Dominican Republic; W 3–0	Cuba; L 3–2	Germany; W 3–0	Russia; W 0–3	1 Q	Japan; W 0–3	Cuba; W 2–3	Russia; W 2–3	1st place, gold medalist(s)

Roster

The following is the Chinese roster in the women's volleyball tournament of the 2004 Summer Olympics.

Head coach: Chen Zhonghe

No.	Name	Date of birth	Height	Weight	Spike	Block	2004 club
2	Feng Kun (c)	28 December 1978	1.83 m (6 ft 0 in)	75 kg (165 lb)	319 cm (126 in)	310 cm (120 in)	(China) Beijing
3	Yang Hao	21 March 1980	1.83 m (6 ft 0 in)	75 kg (165 lb)	319 cm (126 in)	314 cm (124 in)	(China) Liaoning
4	Liu Yanan	29 September 1980	1.86 m (6 ft 1 in)	73 kg (161 lb)	320 cm (130 in)	313 cm (123 in)	(China) Liaoning
6	Li Shan	21 May 1980	1.85 m (6 ft 1 in)	74 kg (163 lb)	317 cm (125 in)	300 cm (120 in)	(China) Tianjin Bridgestone
7	Zhou Suhong	23 April 1979	1.82 m (6 ft 0 in)	72 kg (159 lb)	313 cm (123 in)	305 cm (120 in)	(China) Zhejiang
8	Zhao Ruirui	8 October 1981	1.98 m (6 ft 6 in)	75 kg (165 lb)	326 cm (128 in)	315 cm (124 in)	(China) Bayi Xuezhongfei
9	Zhang Yuehong	9 November 1975	1.84 m (6 ft 0 in)	73 kg (161 lb)	324 cm (128 in)	322 cm (127 in)	(China) Liaoning
10	Chen Jing	3 September 1975	1.82 m (6 ft 0 in)	75 kg (165 lb)	312 cm (123 in)	306 cm (120 in)	(China) Sichuan
12	Song Nina	7 April 1980	1.79 m (5 ft 10 in)	65 kg (143 lb)	303 cm (119 in)	293 cm (115 in)	(China) Bayi Xuezhongfei
15	Wang Lina	5 February 1978	1.81 m (5 ft 11 in)	75 kg (165 lb)	319 cm (126 in)	300 cm (120 in)	(China) Bayi Xuezhongfei
16	Zhang Na (L)	19 April 1980	1.80 m (5 ft 11 in)	70 kg (150 lb)	302 cm (119 in)	292 cm (115 in)	(China) Tianjin Bridgestone
18	Zhang Ping	23 May 1982	1.87 m (6 ft 2 in)	73 kg (161 lb)	312 cm (123 in)	301 cm (119 in)	(China) Tianjin Bridgestone

Group play

Pos	Team	Pld	W	L	Pts	SW	SL	SR	SPW	SPL	SPR	Qualification
1	China	5	4	1	9	14	4	3.500	429	346	1.240	Quarterfinals
2	Russia	5	3	2	8	11	8	1.375	426	388	1.098	Quarterfinals
3	Cuba	5	3	2	8	11	10	1.100	443	460	0.963	Quarterfinals
4	United States	5	2	3	7	11	10	1.100	472	467	1.011	Quarterfinals
5	Germany	5	2	3	7	7	11	0.636	387	414	0.935	
6	Dominican Republic	5	1	4	6	3	14	0.214	334	416	0.803	

Source: FIVB

August 14, 2004; 21:00	China	3–1	United States	Peace and Friendship Stadium; Attendance: 2,300; Referees: Jarmo Salonen (Finland), Fotios Lekkas (Greece)
August 14, 2004; 21:00	(25–21, 23–25, 25–22, 25–18)			Peace and Friendship Stadium; Attendance: 2,300; Referees: Jarmo Salonen (Finland), Fotios Lekkas (Greece)

August 16, 2004; 11:00	China	3–0	Dominican Republic	Peace and Friendship Stadium; Attendance: 474; Referees: Fotios Lekkas (Greece), Jarmo Salonen (Finland)
August 16, 2004; 11:00	(25–20, 25–16, 25–16)			Peace and Friendship Stadium; Attendance: 474; Referees: Fotios Lekkas (Greece), Jarmo Salonen (Finland)

August 18, 2004; 14:00	Cuba	3–2	China	Peace and Friendship Stadium; Attendance: 4,300; Referees: Patrick Rachard (France), Umit Sokullu (Turkey)
August 18, 2004; 14:00	(25–19, 22–25, 15–25, 25–21, 15–13)			Peace and Friendship Stadium; Attendance: 4,300; Referees: Patrick Rachard (France), Umit Sokullu (Turkey)

August 20, 2004; 9:00	China	3–0	Germany	Peace and Friendship Stadium; Attendance: 1,630; Referees: Valdir Dellaqua (Brazil), Mahmoud Abdel Magid (Egypt)
August 20, 2004; 9:00	(25–18, 25–15, 25–16)			Peace and Friendship Stadium; Attendance: 1,630; Referees: Valdir Dellaqua (Brazil), Mahmoud Abdel Magid (Egypt)

August 22, 2004; 14:00	Russia	0–3	China	Peace and Friendship Stadium; Attendance: 6,320; Referees: Juan Angel Pereyra (Argentina), Patricia Salvatore (United States)
August 22, 2004; 14:00	(15–25, 16–25, 26–28)			Peace and Friendship Stadium; Attendance: 6,320; Referees: Juan Angel Pereyra (Argentina), Patricia Salvatore (United States)

Quarterfinal

August 24, 2004; 14:00	Japan	0–3	China	Peace and Friendship Stadium; Attendance: 3,520; Referees: Abdullah Al Khelaifi (Saudi Arabia), Georgios Karampetsos (Greece)
August 24, 2004; 14:00	(20–25, 22–25, 20–25)			Peace and Friendship Stadium; Attendance: 3,520; Referees: Abdullah Al Khelaifi (Saudi Arabia), Georgios Karampetsos (Greece)

Semifinal

August 26, 2004; 22:15	Cuba	2–3	China	Peace and Friendship Stadium; Attendance: 5,120; Referees: Luciano Gaspari (Italy), Dejan Jovanovic (Serbia and Montenegro)
August 26, 2004; 22:15	(22–25, 20–25, 25–17, 25–23, 10–15)			Peace and Friendship Stadium; Attendance: 5,120; Referees: Luciano Gaspari (Italy), Dejan Jovanovic (Serbia and Montenegro)

Gold Medal Final

August 28, 2004; 20:10	Russia	2–3	China	Peace and Friendship Stadium; Attendance: 4,242; Referees: Juan Angel Pereyra (Argentina), Patricia Salvatore (United States)
August 28, 2004; 20:10	(30–28, 27–25, 20–25, 23–25, 12–15)			Peace and Friendship Stadium; Attendance: 4,242; Referees: Juan Angel Pereyra (Argentina), Patricia Salvatore (United States)

Won Gold Medal

== Weightlifting ==
Ten Chinese weightlifters qualified for the following events:

Men

Athlete	Event	Snatch		Clean & Jerk		Total	Rank
Athlete	Event	Result	Rank	Result	Rank	Total	Rank
Wu Meijin	−56 kg	130	2	157.5	2	287.5	2nd place, silver medalist(s)
Le Maosheng	−62 kg	140	=2	172.5	=1	312.5	2nd place, silver medalist(s)
Shi Zhiyong	−62 kg	152.5 OR	1	172.5	=1	325 =OR	1st place, gold medalist(s)
Zhang Guozheng	−69 kg	160	1	187.5	=2	347.5	1st place, gold medalist(s)
Zhan Xugang	−77 kg	~~157.5~~	DNF	—	—	—	DNF
Yuan Aijun	−85 kg	167.5	=5	205	=1	372.5	5

Women

Athlete	Event	Snatch		Clean & Jerk		Total	Rank
Athlete	Event	Result	Rank	Result	Rank	Total	Rank
Li Zhuo	−48 kg	92.5	2	112.5	=2	205	2nd place, silver medalist(s)
Chen Yanqing	−58 kg	107.5 OR	=1	130 =OR	=1	237.5 OR	1st place, gold medalist(s)
Liu Chunhong	−69 kg	122.5 WR	1	152.5 WR	1	275 WR	1st place, gold medalist(s)
Tang Gonghong	+75 kg	122.5	8	182.5 WR	1	305 WR	1st place, gold medalist(s)

== Wrestling ==
Key:

- VT - Victory by Fall.
- PP - Decision by Points - the loser with technical points.
- PO - Decision by Points - the loser without technical points.

Men's freestyle

Athlete	Event	Elimination Pool			Quarterfinal	Semifinal	Final / BM	
Athlete	Event	Opposition Result	Opposition Result	Rank	Opposition Result	Opposition Result	Opposition Result	Rank
Li Zhengyu	−55 kg	Velikov (BUL); W 3–1 ^{PP}	Williams (RSA); W 3–1 ^{PP}	1 Q	Abas (USA); L 1–3 ^{PP}	Did not advance	Kim H-S (KOR); W 3–1 ^{PP}	5
Wang Yuanyuan	−96 kg	Laliotis (GRE); L 1–3 ^{PP}	Pecha (SVK); W 3–1 ^{PP}	1 Q	Ibragimov (UZB); L 1–3 ^{PP}	Did not advance	Aghayev (AZE); L 0–5 ^{VT}	6

Men's Greco-Roman

Athlete	Event	Elimination Pool				Quarterfinal	Semifinal	Final / BM	
Athlete	Event	Opposition Result	Opposition Result	Opposition Result	Rank	Opposition Result	Opposition Result	Opposition Result	Rank
Sheng Jiang	−55 kg	Kiouregkian (GRE); L 0–3 ^{PO}	Nyblom (DEN); L 1–3 ^{PP}	Kalilov (KGZ); W 3–1 ^{PP}	3	Did not advance			13
Ailinuer	−60 kg	Shevtsov (RUS); L 1–3 ^{PP}	Kohl (GER); W 3–1 ^{PP}	—N/a	2	Did not advance			13
Sai Yinjiya	−74 kg	Bucher (SUI); L 1–3 ^{PP}	Kikiniou (BLR); W 3–1 ^{PP}	—N/a	2	Did not advance			11

Women's freestyle

Athlete	Event	Elimination Pool				Classification	Semifinal	Final / BM	
Athlete	Event	Opposition Result	Opposition Result	Opposition Result	Rank	Opposition Result	Opposition Result	Opposition Result	Rank
Li Hui	−48 kg	Miranda (USA); L 1–3 ^{PP}	Oorzhak (RUS); L 1–3 ^{PP}	Caripá (VEN); W 4–0 ^{ST}	3	Did not advance			9
Sun Dongmei	−55 kg	Yoshida (JPN); W 4–0 ^{ST}	Giampiccolo (ITA); W 3–1 ^{PP}	—N/a	2	Lee N-L (KOR); W 3–1 ^{PP}	Bye	Fonseca (PUR); L 1–3 ^{PP}	5
Meng Lili	−63 kg	McMann (USA); L 0–5 ^{VT}	Yanik (CAN); W 3–1 ^{PP}	—N/a	3	Did not advance			9
Wang Xu	−72 kg	Nordhagen (CAN); W 3–1 ^{PP}	Juszczak (ITA); W 3–0 ^{PO}	—N/a	1 Q	Bye	Hamaguchi (JPN); W 3–1 ^{PP}	Manyurova (RUS); W 3–1 ^{PP}	1st place, gold medalist(s)

== See also ==
- China at the 2002 Asian Games
- China at the 2004 Summer Paralympics
