= Fencing at the 2004 Summer Olympics – Men's team épée =

Men's team épée at the Games of the XXVIII Olympiad
- Venue: Helliniko Olympic Complex
- Date: August 22, 2004

Medalists
1st place, gold medalist(s)		Fabrice Jeannet; Jérôme Jeannet; Hugues Obry; Érik Boisse	France
2nd place, silver medalist(s)		Gábor Boczkó; Krisztián Kulcsár; Iván Kovács; Géza Imre	Hungary
3rd place, bronze medalist(s)		Sven Schmid; Jörg Fiedler; Daniel Strigel	Germany

These are the results of the men's épée team competition in fencing at the 2004 Summer Olympics in Athens. A total of 30 men from eight nations competed in this event. Competition took place in the Fencing Hall at the Helliniko Olympic Complex on August 22.

== Draw ==
The team competition was a single-elimination tournament among the eight teams. Quarterfinal losers continued to play classification matches to determine final placement from first to eighth. Each team match consisted of a set of nine individual matches, comprising a full round-robin schedule among the three fencers on each team.

=== Finals ===
Quarterfinals
10:00
France	45
United States	32
10:00
Germany	39
China	32
10:00
Hungary	38
Ukraine	34
10:00
Russia	41
Egypt	30

Semifinals
11:25
France	45
Germany	44
11:25
Hungary	34
Russia	26

Gold medal final
19:50
France	43
Hungary	32
Bronze medal final
18:30
Germany	37
Russia	29

Classification matches
11:25
Ukraine	45
Egypt	36
11:25
United States	45
China	36

Fifth place match
12:50
Ukraine	45
United States	33
Seventh place match
12:50
China	45
Egypt	26

=== Quarterfinals ===
France	45 – 32	United States
Fabrice Jeannet	5 – 2	Weston Kelsey
Érik Boisse	1 – 2	Cody Mattern
Hugues Obry	6 – 5	Soren Thompson
Érik Boisse	6 – 3	Weston Kelsey
Fabrice Jeannet	6 – 1	Soren Thompson
Hugues Obry	3 – 2	Cody Mattern
Érik Boisse	7 – 10	Soren Thompson
Hugues Obry	6 – 5	Weston Kelsey
Fabrice Jeannet	5 – 2	Cody Mattern

Germany	39 – 32	China
Sven Schmid	4 – 2	Wang Lei
Daniel Strigel	3 – 1	Zhao Gang
Jörg Fiedler	1 – 5	Xie Yongjun
Daniel Strigel	5 – 7	Wang Lei
Sven Schmid	4 – 2	Xie Yongjun
Jörg Fiedler	1 – 0	Zhao Gang
Daniel Strigel	6 – 6	Xie Yongjun
Jörg Fiedler	1 – 1	Wang Lei
Sven Schmid	14 – 8	Zhao Gang

Hungary	38 – 34	Ukraine
Gábor Boczkó	2 – 1	Maksym Khvorost
Iván Kovács	5 – 2	Bogdan Nikishin
Géza Imre	8 – 13	Dmitriy Karuchenko
Gábor Boczkó	3 – 2	Bogdan Nikishin
Géza Imre	7 – 8	Maksym Khvorost
Iván Kovács	4 – 5	Dmitriy Karuchenko
Géza Imre	1 – 1	Bogdan Nikishin
Gábor Boczkó	3 – 1	Dmitriy Karuchenko
Iván Kovács	7 – 2	Maksym Khvorost

Russia	41 – 30	Egypt
Serguey Kotchetkov	2 – 1	Mohanad Saif El Din Sabry
Igor Tourchine	8 – 7	Yasser Mahmoud
Pavel Kolobkov	5 – 3	Ahmed Nabil
Igor Tourchine	3 – 1	Mohanad Saif El Din Sabry
Serguey Kotchetkov	2 – 1	Ahmed Nabil
Pavel Kolobkov	2 – 3	Yasser Mahmoud
Igor Tourchine	10 – 6	Ahmed Nabil
Pavel Kolobkov	2 – 1	Mohanad Saif El Din Sabry
Serguey Kotchetkov	7 – 7	Yasser Mahmoud

=== Semifinals ===
France	45 – 44	Germany
Hugues Obry	1 – 2	Sven Schmid
Fabrice Jeannet	9 – 5	Jörg Fiedler
Jérôme Jeannet	5 – 2	Daniel Strigel
Hugues Obry	5 – 4	Jörg Fiedler
Jérôme Jeannet	5 – 6	Sven Schmid
Fabrice Jeannet	5 – 7	Daniel Strigel
Jérôme Jeannet	3 – 5	Jörg Fiedler
Hugues Obry	5 – 3	Daniel Strigel
Fabrice Jeannet	7 – 10	Sven Schmid

Hungary	34 – 26	Russia
Gábor Boczkó	2 – 1	Serguey Kotchetkov
Iván Kovács	6 – 7	Igor Tourchine
Krisztián Kulcsár	0 – 0	Pavel Kolobkov
Gábor Boczkó	5 – 5	Igor Tourchine
Krisztián Kulcsár	0 – 0	Serguey Kotchetkov
Iván Kovács	4 – 1	Pavel Kolobkov
Krisztián Kulcsár	2 – 3	Igor Tourchine
Gábor Boczkó	5 – 3	Pavel Kolobkov
Iván Kovács	10 – 6	Serguey Kotchetkov

=== Classification matches ===
Ukraine	45 – 36	Egypt
Bogdan Nikishin	4 – 5	Yasser Mahmoud
Dmitriy Karuchenko	3 – 5	Ahmed Nabil
Maksym Khvorost	3 – 4	Mohanad Saif El Din Sabry
Bogdan Nikishin	8 – 5	Ahmed Nabil
Vitaly Osharov	7 – 4	Yasser Mahmoud
Dmitriy Karuchenko	5 – 2	Mohanad Saif El Din Sabry
Vitaly Osharov	5 – 2	Ahmed Nabil
Bogdan Nikishin	5 – 5	Mohanad Saif El Din Sabry
Dmitriy Karuchenko	5 – 4	Yasser Mahmoud

United States	45 – 36	China
Cody Mattern	5 – 4	Wang Lei
Weston Kelsey	5 – 3	Tuo Tong
Soren Thompson	4 – 5	Xie Yongjun
Cody Mattern	2 – 0	Tuo Tong
Soren Thompson	9 – 4	Wang Lei
Weston Kelsey	3 – 7	Xie Yongjun
Soren Thompson	7 – 5	Tuo Tong
Cody Mattern	5 – 8	Xie Yongjun
Weston Kelsey	5 – 0	Wang Lei

=== Seventh place match ===
China	45 – 26	Egypt
Wang Lei	2 – 5	Yasser Mahmoud
Xie Yongjun	5 – 1	Ibrahim Abd El Rahim
Tuo Tong	5 – 3	Ahmed Nabil
Wang Lei	8 – 3	Ibrahim Abd El Rahim
Tuo Tong	5 – 3	Yasser Mahmoud
Xie Yongjun	5 – 4	Ahmed Nabil
Tuo Tong	5 – 0	Ibrahim Abd El Rahim
Wang Lei	5 – 5	Ahmed Nabil
Xie Yongjun	5 – 2	Yasser Mahmoud

=== Fifth place match ===
Ukraine	45 – 33	United States
Vitaly Osharov	5 – 1	Cody Mattern
Bogdan Nikishin	3 – 0	Weston Kelsey
Dmitriy Karuchenko	4 – 3	Joseph Viviani
Bogdan Nikishin	6 – 2	Cody Mattern
Vitaly Osharov	0 – 2	Joseph Viviani
Dmitriy Karuchenko	7 – 6	Weston Kelsey
Bogdan Nikishin	2 – 1	Joseph Viviani
Dmitriy Karuchenko	13 – 9	Cody Mattern
Vitaly Osharov	5 – 9	Weston Kelsey

=== Bronze medal match ===
Germany	37 – 29	Russia
Sven Schmid	3 – 3	Serguey Kotchetkov
Jörg Fiedler	4 – 2	Igor Tourchine
Daniel Strigel	1 – 3	Pavel Kolobkov
Sven Schmid	6 – 8	Igor Tourchine
Daniel Strigel	2 – 1	Serguey Kotchetkov
Jörg Fiedler	1 – 0	Pavel Kolobkov
Daniel Strigel	3 – 1	Igor Tourchine
Sven Schmid	5 – 5	Pavel Kolobkov
Jörg Fiedler	12 – 6	Serguey Kotchetkov

=== Gold medal match ===
France	43 – 32	Hungary
Fabrice Jeannet	5 – 3	Gábor Boczkó
Jérôme Jeannet	3 – 2	Krisztián Kulcsár
Hugues Obry	5 – 8	Iván Kovács
Jérôme Jeannet	1 – 1	Gábor Boczkó
Fabrice Jeannet	4 – 3	Iván Kovács
Hugues Obry	1 – 1	Krisztián Kulcsár
Jérôme Jeannet	2 – 0	Iván Kovács
Hugues Obry	6 – 5	Gábor Boczkó
Fabrice Jeannet	16 – 9	Krisztián Kulcsár
