= Jörg Fiedler =

German fencer (born 1978)

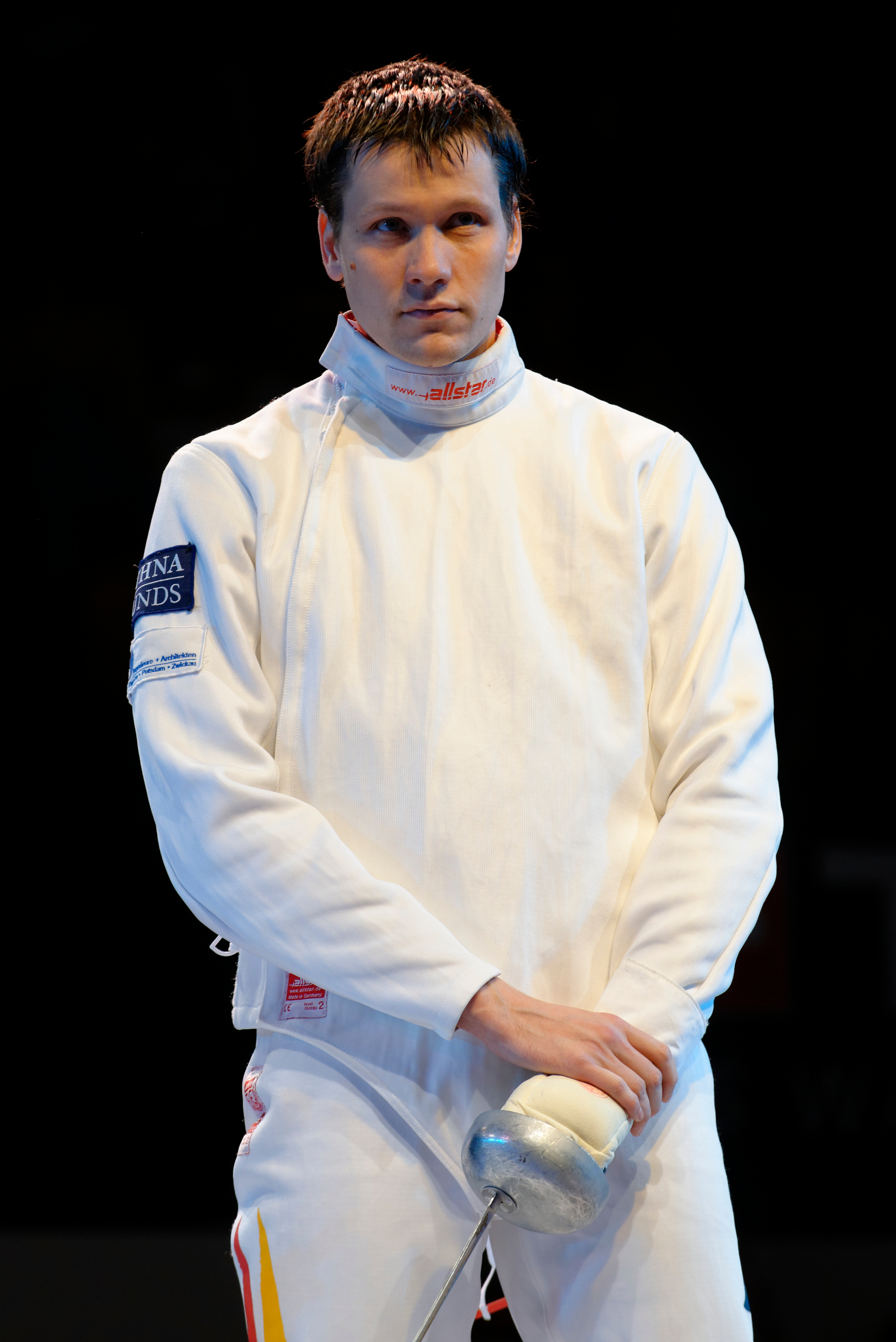
- Fiedler at the 2013 Masters épée

Personal information
- Born: 21 February 1978 (age 48) Leipzig, East Germany
- Height: 1.93 m (6 ft 4 in)
- Weight: 87 kg (192 lb)

Fencing career
- Sport: Fencing
- Country: Germany
- Weapon: Épée
- Hand: Left-handed
- National coach: Didier Ollagnon
- Club: Fechtclub-Leipzig e.V. FC Tauberbischofsheim
- FIE ranking: current ranking
Medal record
Olympic Games
Bronze medal – third place	2004 Athens	Team épée
World Championships
Silver medal – second place	1999 Seul	Team épée
Silver medal – second place	2003 Havana	Team épée
Silver medal – second place	2005 Leipzig	Team épée
European Championships
Gold medal – first place	2011 Sheffield	Individual épée
Gold medal – first place	2013 Zagreb	Individual épée
Silver medal – second place	2001 Coblenz	Team épée
Bronze medal – third place	1999 Bozen	Team épée
Bronze medal – third place	2010 Leipzig	Team épée
Bronze medal – third place	2012 Legnano	Individual épée

Jörg Fiedler (also spelled Joerg; born 21 February 1978) is a German épée fencer, European champion in 2011 and 2013, and three-time team silver world medallist (1999, 2003, and 2005).

Fiedler took part in the 2000 Summer Olympics, where he lost in the second round to Oleksandr Horbachuk. In the team event, Germany finished 5th. He won a bronze medal with Sven Schmid and Daniel Strigel in the team épée event at the 2004 Summer Olympics. In the 2012 Summer Olympics, he was defeated by South Korean Jung Jin-sun in the quarter-finals.

In addition to his career as an athlete, Fiedler is also a fencing coach.
