= Xiao Zhen (footballer, born 1976) =

Chinese footballer

Personal information
- Full name: Xiao Zhen
- Place of birth: Chengdu, Sichuan, China
- Position: Goalkeeper

International career
| Years | Team | Apps | (Gls) |
- China
Medal record
Women's football
Representing China
Asian Games
| Silver medal – second place | 2002 Busan | Team |

Xiao Zhen (Chinese: 肖珍; pinyin: Xiào Zhēn; born December 16, 1976, in Chengdu, Sichuan) is a female Chinese football goalkeeper who competed in the 2004 Summer Olympics.

In 2004, she finished ninth with the Chinese team in the women's tournament. She played both matches.
