= Luo Lin =

Chinese softball player

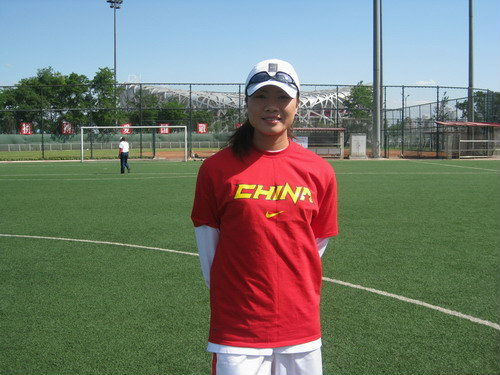
Luo Lin.

Luo Lin (simplified Chinese: 罗琳; traditional Chinese: 羅琳; pinyin: Luó Lín; Jyutping: Lo4 Lam4; born April 6, 1979, in Guangzhou, Guangdong) is a female Chinese softball player who competed at the 2004 Summer Olympics.

In the 2004 Olympic softball competition she finished fourth with the Chinese team. She played four matches as outfielder.
