= Chi Qiang =

Chinese sailor (born 1975)

Chi Qiang (born 26 December 1975) is a Chinese competitive sailor who competed in the 2004 Summer Olympics.
