= Lei Sufen =

Chinese handball player (born 1979)

Lei Sufen (Chinese: 雷素芬; pinyin: Léi Sùfēn; born June 5, 1979, in Nanning, Guangxi) is a female Chinese handball player who competed at the 2004 Summer Olympics.

In 2004, she finished eighth with the Chinese team in the women's competition. She played four matches and scored one goal.
