= Shi Dan =

Chinese footballer (born 1980)

Shi Dan (Chinese: 史丹; pinyin: Shǐ Dān; born December 3, 1980, in Shenyang) is a female Chinese association football player who competed at the 2004 Summer Olympics.

In 2004, she was a squad member of the Chinese team which finished ninth in the women's tournament.
