= Gao Yingying =

Chinese footballer

Gao Yingying (simplified Chinese: 高颖颖; traditional Chinese: 高穎穎; pinyin: Gāo Yǐngyǐng; born September 17, 1981, in Shandong) is a female Chinese association football player who competed at the 2004 Summer Olympics.

In 2004, she was a squad member of the Chinese team which finished ninth in the women's tournament.
