= Jan Viviani =

American fencer (born 1981)

Personal information
- Born: March 11, 1981 (age 45) New York, New York, United States

Sport
- Sport: Fencing

Jan Viviani (born March 11, 1981) is an American fencer. He competed in the team épée event at the 2004 Summer Olympics.
