= Zhang Lixia =

Chinese softball player

Personal information
- Born: January 25, 1977 (age 49) Pingliang, Gansu
- Height: 178 cm (5 ft 10 in)
Medal record
Women's softball
Representing China
Asian Games
Silver medal – second place	2002 Busan	Team

Zhang Lixia (simplified Chinese: 张丽霞; traditional Chinese: 張麗霞; pinyin: Zhāng Lìxiá; born January 25, 1977, in Gansu) is a female Chinese softball player. She competed at the 2004 Summer Olympics.

In the 2004 Olympic softball competition, she finished fourth with the Chinese team. She played a total of three matches as pitcher.
