= Mi Renrong =

Chinese softball player

Mi Renrong (Chinese: 米仁蓉; pinyin: Mǐ Rénróng; born September 7, 1977, in Suining) is a female Chinese softball player who competed at the 2004 Summer Olympics.

In the 2004 Olympic softball competition she finished fourth with the Chinese team. She played seven matches as catcher.
