= Ibrahim Abdel Rehim Ibrahim Ahmed =

Egyptian fencer

Ibrahim Abdel Rahim
Personal information
- Born: 28 November 1982 (age 43)

Sport
- Sport: Fencing

Ibrahim Abdel Rehim Ibrahim Ahmed (born 28 November 1982) is an Egyptian fencer.

== Sporting career ==
Ahmed was a member of the Egyptian National Fencing Team (Épée Men. He participated with the Egyptian fencing épée team at the Athens Olympic Games in 2004, where Egypt finished in the 8th position. His best position in international Competitions was the 7th position, at Tehran World Cup in 2003. He is an official fencing referee.

== Career ==
Ahmed works for Thomson Reuters in Dubai. He was previously the Head of Communications Department at the Egyptian Competition Authority, Egyptian Cabinet. In 2008, he was awarded a Chevening fellowship to study public policy in the United Kingdom for 3 months.

Ahmed has an advanced Graduate Certificate in Dispute Resolution, University of Massachusetts, USA & Cairo Regional Centre for International Commercial Arbitration, (2006), and an advanced certificate in International Commercial Arbitration, Queen Marry School of Arbitration, University of London, (2005).

Ahmed is a Co-author with Mona Yassine, Farida Tawdi and Haytham El Gammal, of “The Independence of Competition Agencies – Case of Egypt” in Barry E. Hawk (ed.), “International Antitrust Law & Policy”, Fordham Competition Law Institute, Juris Publishing Inc., (2008).
