= Yasser Mahmoud =

Egyptian fencer

Personal information
- Full name: Yasser Mahmoud Emam Eldarawani
- Nationality: Egyptian
- Born: 5 November 1975 (age 50)

Sport
- Sport: Fencing
Medal record
World Championships
Gold medal – first place	2004 Tehran	Individual

Yasser Mahmoud (born 5 November 1975) is an Egyptian former fencer. He competed in the individual and team épée events at the 2004 Summer Olympics.

== Medal record ==
=== World Cup ===
Date	Location	Event	Position
2004-7-17	Tehran, Iran	Individual Men's Épée	1st
