= Sven Schmid =

German fencer

Personal information
- Born: 21 January 1978 (age 48) Johannesburg, South Africa

Sport
- Sport: Fencing
- Club: FC Tauberbischofsheim
Medal record
Men's fencing
Representing Germany
Olympic Games
| Bronze medal – third place | 2004 Athens | Épée, team |

Sven Schmid (born 21 January 1978) is a German fencer. He won a bronze medal in the team épée event at the 2004 Summer Olympics.
