= Daniel Strigel =

German fencer

Personal information
- Born: 13 February 1975 (age 51) Mannheim, West Germany

Sport
- Sport: Fencing
Medal record
Men's fencing
Representing Germany
Olympic Games
| Bronze medal – third place | 2004 Athens | Épée, team |

Daniel Strigel (born 13 February 1975) is a German fencer. He won a bronze medal in the team épée event at the 2004 Summer Olympics.
