= Tuo Tong =

Chinese fencer

Personal information
- Born: 27 April 1984 (age 42) Chongqing, China

Sport
- Sport: Fencing

Tuo Tong (born 27 April 1984) is a Chinese fencer who competed in the team épée event at the 2004 Summer Olympics.
