= Romania at the 2008 Summer Olympics =

- IOC code: ROU
- NOC: Romanian Olympic and Sports Committee
- Website: www.cosr.ro (in Romanian, English, and French)

in Beijing
- Competitors: 102 in 16 sports
- Flag bearers: Valeria Beșe (opening); Georgeta Andrunache (closing)
- Medals Ranked 17th: Gold 4 Silver 1 Bronze 4 Total 9

Summer Olympics appearances (overview)
- 1900; 1904–1920; 1924; 1928; 1932; 1936; 1948; 1952; 1956; 1960; 1964; 1968; 1972; 1976; 1980; 1984; 1988; 1992; 1996; 2000; 2004; 2008; 2012; 2016; 2020; 2024; 2028

Romania competed in the 2008 Summer Olympics, held in Beijing, China from August 8 to August 24, 2008. Romania intended to send 104 competitors to Beijing, although the delegation was reduced to 102 when two Romanian athletes were suspended for doping before the start of the Olympics. The Romanian delegation for Beijing was the smallest Romanian Olympic delegation since the 1989 Revolution. Romanians competed in 16 sports: athletics, archery, handball, gymnastics, wrestling, swimming, diving, weightlifting, fencing, table tennis, shooting, tennis, judo, boxing, kayak-canoeing, and rowing.

== Medalists ==
Medal	Name	Sport	Event	Date
Gold	Alina Dumitru	Judo	Women's 48 kg	August 9
Gold	Georgeta Andrunache; Viorica Susanu	Rowing	Women's coxless pair	August 16
Gold	Constantina Diṭă-Tomescu	Athletics	Women's marathon	August 16
Gold	Sandra Izbașa	Gymnastics	Women's floor	August 17
Silver	Ana Maria Brânză	Fencing	Women's épée	August 13
Bronze	Mihai Covaliu	Fencing	Men's sabre	August 12
Bronze	Andreea Acatrinei; Gabriela Drăgoi; Andreea Grigore; Sandra Izbașa; Steliana Nistor; Anamaria Tămârjan	Gymnastics	Women's artistic team all-around	August 12
Bronze	Constanța Burcică; Viorica Susanu; Rodica Șerban; Enikő Barabás; Simona Mușat; Ioana Papuc; Georgeta Andrunache; Doina Ignat; Elena Georgescu	Rowing	Women's eight	August 17
Bronze	Gheorghiță Ștefan	Wrestling	Men's freestyle 74 kg	August 20/ 18 Nov 2016

Medals by sport
Sport	1st place, gold medalist(s)	2nd place, silver medalist(s)	3rd place, bronze medalist(s)	Total
Athletics	1	0	0	1
Fencing	0	1	1	2
Gymnastics	1	0	1	2
Judo	1	0	0	1
Rowing	1	0	1	2
Wrestling	0	0	1	1
Total	4	1	4	9

Medals by gender
Gender	1st place, gold medalist(s)	2nd place, silver medalist(s)	3rd place, bronze medalist(s)	Total
Male	0	0	2	2
Female	4	1	2	7
Total	4	1	4	9

== Archery ==
Romania sent archers to the Olympics for the second time (and first since 1980), seeking the nation's first Olympic medal in the sport. Alexandru Bodnar earned the country its first qualifying spot in the men's competition by placing 29th in the 2007 World Outdoor Target Championships.

Athlete	Event	Ranking round		Round of 64	Round of 32	Round of 16	Quarterfinals	Semifinals	Final / BM	
Athlete	Event	Score	Seed	Opposition Score	Opposition Score	Opposition Score	Opposition Score	Opposition Score	Opposition Score	Rank
Alexandru Bodnar	Men's individual	614	60	Aziz (MAS); W 106–105	Stevens (CUB); L 101–108	Did not advance				

== Athletics ==
The following athletes were selected for the Romanian team.

Men - Field events

Athlete	Event	Qualification		Final	
Athlete	Event	Distance	Position	Distance	Position
Marian Oprea	Triple jump	17.17	8 Q	17.22	5

Women - Track & road events

Athlete	Event	Heat		Quarterfinal		Semifinal		Final	
Athlete	Event	Result	Rank	Result	Rank	Result	Rank	Result	Rank
Ionela Târlea	200 m	23.24	4 Q	23.22	5	Did not advance			
Mihaela Neacșu	800 m	2:03.03	6	—N/a		Did not advance			
Angela Moroșanu	400 m hurdles	56.07	4 Q	—N/a		57.67	8	Did not advance	
Ancuța Bobocel	3000 m steeplechase	9:35.31	6	—N/a				Did not advance	
Cristina Casandra	3000 m steeplechase	9:22.48	4 Q	—N/a				9:16.85	5
Constantina Diṭă-Tomescu	Marathon	—N/a						2:26:44	1st place, gold medalist(s)
Lidia Șimon	Marathon	—N/a						2:27:51	8
Luminița Talpoș	Marathon	—N/a						2:31:41	18
Ana Maria Groza	20 km walk	—N/a						1:32:16	24

Women - Field events

Athlete	Event	Qualification		Final	
Athlete	Event	Distance	Position	Distance	Position
Viorica Țigău	Long jump	6.44	23	Did not advance	
Adelina Gavrilă	Triple jump	13.98	19	Did not advance	
Anca Heltne	Shot put	17.48	21	Did not advance	
Nicoleta Grasu	Discus throw	62.51	2 Q	58.63	12
Bianca Perie	Hammer throw	68.21	18	Did not advance	
Monica Stoian	Javelin throw	54.56	40	Did not advance	
Felicia Țilea-Moldovan	Javelin throw	60.81	10 Q	53.04	12

Key

- Note–Ranks given for track events are within the athlete's heat only
- Q = Qualified for the next round
- q = Qualified for the next round as a fastest loser or, in field events, by position without achieving the qualifying target
- NR = National record
- N/A = Round not applicable for the event
- Bye = Athlete not required to compete in round

== Boxing ==
Romania qualified two boxers for the Olympic boxing tournament. Popescu qualified at the first European qualifying tournament. Gheorghe qualified at the second European continental qualifying tournament.

Athlete	Event	Round of 32	Round of 16	Quarterfinals	Semifinals	Final	
Athlete	Event	Opposition Result	Opposition Result	Opposition Result	Opposition Result	Opposition Result	Rank
Georgian Popescu	Lightweight	Ali (USA); W 20–5	Vargas (MEX); W 14–4	Ugás (CUB); L 7–11	Did not advance		
Ionuț Gheorghe	Light welterweight	González (PUR); W 21–4	Sepahvandi (IRI); L 4–8	Did not advance			

== Canoeing ==
=== Sprint ===
Athlete	Event	Heats		Semifinals		Final	
Athlete	Event	Time	Rank	Time	Rank	Time	Rank
Florin Georgian Mironcic	Men's C-1 500 m	1:48.608	2 QS	1:51.535	2 Q	1:49.861	7
Florin Georgian Mironcic	Men's C-1 1000 m	3:57.538	2 QS	3:59.664	2 Q	3:57.876	6
Josif Chirilă; Andrei Cuculici	Men's C-2 500 m	1:42.306	4 QS	1:42:545	1 Q	1:43.195	6
Niculae Flocea; Ciprian Popa	Men's C-2 1000 m	3:41.846	2 QF	Bye		3:40.342	4

Qualification Legend: QS = Qualify to semi-final; QF = Qualify directly to final

== Diving ==
Men

Athlete	Events	Preliminaries		Semifinals		Final	
Athlete	Events	Points	Rank	Points	Rank	Points	Rank
Constantin Popovici	10 m platform	392.30	23	Did not advance			

Women

Athlete	Events	Preliminaries		Semifinals		Final	
Athlete	Events	Points	Rank	Points	Rank	Points	Rank
Ramona Maria Ciobanu	10 m platform	279.10	24	Did not advance			

== Fencing ==
Men

Athlete	Event	Round of 64	Round of 32	Round of 16	Quarterfinal	Semifinal	Final / BM	
Athlete	Event	Opposition Score	Opposition Score	Opposition Score	Opposition Score	Opposition Score	Opposition Score	Rank
Virgil Sălișcan	Individual foil	—N/a	Kruse (GBR); L 6–15	Did not advance				
Mihai Covaliu	Individual sabre	Bye	Pryiemka (BLR); W 15–7	Zhou Hm (CHN); W 15–12	Buikevich (BLR); W 15–13	Lopez (FRA); L 13–15	Pillet (FRA); W 15–11	3rd place, bronze medalist(s)
Rareș Dumitrescu	Individual sabre	Bye	Keita (SEN); W 15–9	Pillet (FRA); L 13–15	Did not advance			

Women

Athlete	Event	Round of 64	Round of 32	Round of 16	Quarterfinal	Semifinal	Final / BM	
Athlete	Event	Opposition Score	Opposition Score	Opposition Score	Opposition Score	Opposition Score	Opposition Score	Rank
Ana Maria Brânză	Individual épée	—N/a	Bye	Harada (JPN); W 15–11	Shutova (RUS); W 15–13	Mincza-Nébald (HUN); W 15–14	Heidemann (GER); L 11–15	2nd place, silver medalist(s)
Cristina Stahl	Individual foil	Bye	Wächter (GER); L 6–15	Did not advance				

== Gymnastics ==
=== Artistic ===
Men
Team

Athlete	Event	Qualification								Final							
Athlete	Event	Apparatus						Total	Rank	Apparatus						Total	Rank
Athlete	Event	F	PH	R	V	PB	HB	Total	Rank	F	PH	R	V	PB	HB	Total	Rank
Adrian Bucur	Team	14.725	12.525	14.950	15.700	14.825	13.750	86.475	36	—N/a		15.125	—N/a				
Marian Drăgulescu	Team	15.925 Q	—N/a		16.625 Q	—N/a	14.800	—N/a		15.650	—N/a		16.550	—N/a	14.425	—N/a	
Flavius Koczi	Team	15.125	14.400	13.950	16.600 Q	15.075	15.025	90.175	16 Q	15.075	15.175	—N/a	16.525	15.050	14.325	—N/a	
Ilie Daniel Popescu	Team	14.575	14.500	13.975	16.400	14.525	13.325	87.300	32	—N/a	13.700	—N/a	16.225	—N/a			
Răzvan Șelariu	Team	15.400	14.075	15.175	12.900	14.950	13.475	85.975	38	15.525	14.650	15.325	—N/a	14.850	14.750	—N/a	
Robert Stănescu	Team	—N/a	12.925	15.750 Q	—N/a	15.200	—N/a			—N/a		15.925	—N/a	15.325	—N/a		
Total	Team	61.175	55.900	59.850	65.325	60.050	57.050	359.350	8 Q	49.300	46.250	43.525	46.375	45.225	45.225	274.175	7

Individual finals

Athlete	Event	Apparatus						Total	Rank
Athlete	Event	F	PH	R	V	PB	HB	Total	Rank
Marian Drăgulescu	Floor	14.850	—N/a					14.850	7
Marian Drăgulescu	Vault	—N/a			16.225	—N/a		16.225	4
Flavius Koczi	All-around	16.450	14.900	15.425	14.550	13.525	14.725	89.575	18
Flavius Koczi	Vault	—N/a			15.925	—N/a		15.925	7
Robert Stănescu	Rings	—N/a		15.825	—N/a			15.825	7

Women
Team

Athlete	Event	Qualification						Final					
Athlete	Event	Apparatus				Total	Rank	Apparatus				Total	Rank
Athlete	Event	F	V	UB	BB	Total	Rank	F	V	UB	BB	Total	Rank
Andreea Acatrinei	Team	14.775	14.350	—N/a	14.175	—N/a		Did not compete					
Gabriela Drăgoi	Team	14.250	—N/a	14.225	15.450 Q	—N/a		—N/a		14.425	—N/a		
Andreea Grigore	Team	—N/a	14.700	13.975	—N/a			Did not compete					
Sandra Izbașa	Team	15.475 Q	15.100	13.575	15.225	59.375	13 Q	15.550	15.100	—N/a	15.600	—N/a	
Steliana Nistor	Team	14.550	14.900	15.975 Q	15.075	60.500	8 Q	14.575	15.050	16.150	15.150	—N/a	
Anamaria Tămârjan	Team	14.500	15.025	14.275	15.200	59.000	16*	14.950	15.125	14.425	15.425	—N/a	
Total	Team	59.300	59.725	58.450	60.950	238.425	4 Q	45.075	45.275	45.000	46.175	181.525	3rd place, bronze medalist(s)

* Only two gymnasts per country may advance to a final.

Individual finals

Athlete	Event	Apparatus				Total	Rank
Athlete	Event	F	V	UB	BB	Total	Rank
Gabriela Drăgoi	Balance beam	—N/a			15.625	15.625	5
Sandra Izbașa	All-around	15.500	15.075	14.300	14.300	60.750	8
Sandra Izbașa	Floor	15.650	—N/a			15.650	1st place, gold medalist(s)
Steliana Nistor	All-around	14.500	15.025	15.975	15.550	61.050	5
Steliana Nistor	Uneven bars	—N/a		15.575	—N/a	15.575	7

== Handball ==
=== Women's tournament ===
Roster

The following is the Romania roster in the women's handball tournament of the 2008 Summer Olympics.

Head coach: Gheorghe Tadici

No.	Pos.	Name	Date of birth (age)	Height	App.	Goals	Club
1	GK	Tereza Pislaru	28 April 1982 (aged 26)	1.87 m	90	0	(Romania) CS Oltchim Râmnicu Vâlcea
2	RW	Ramona Maier	14 July 1979 (aged 29)	1.70 m	132	405	(Romania) CS Oltchim Râmnicu Vâlcea
4	P	Florina Birsan	6 December 1985 (aged 22)	1.78 m	18	17	(Romania) U Jolidon Cluj Napoca
5	LB	Carmen Amariei	3 September 1978 (aged 29)	1.84 m	106	612	(Romania) U Jolidon Cluj Napoca
7	RW	Adriana Nechita-Olteanu	14 November 1983 (aged 24)	1.72 m	37	103	(Romania) CS Oltchim Râmnicu Vâlcea
8	LB	Cristina Neagu	26 August 1988 (aged 19)	1.75 m	28	95	(Romania) Rulmentul Braşov
9	LB	Aurelia Brădeanu	5 May 1979 (aged 29)	1.82 m	165	448	(Hungary) Győri Audi ETO KC
10	P	Ionela Stanca-Gâlcă	9 January 1981 (aged 27)	1.76 m	99	218	(Romania) Rulmentul Braşov
12	GK	Talida Tolnai	21 August 1979 (aged 28)	1.87 m	70	1	(Romania) CS Oltchim Râmnicu Vâlcea
15	LW	Valentina Ardean-Elisei	5 June 1982 (aged 26)	1.71 m	94	424	(Romania) CS Oltchim Râmnicu Vâlcea
16	GK	Luminiţa Dinu-Huţupan	6 November 1971 (aged 36)	1.83 m	168	7	(Romania) CS Oltchim Râmnicu Vâlcea
18	LB	Laura Meirosu	11 August 1985 (aged 22)	1.82 m	65	128	(Romania) CS Oltchim Râmnicu Vâlcea
19	CB	Valeria Motogna-Beșe	16 December 1979 (aged 28)	1.87 m	77	124	(Romania) CS Oltchim Râmnicu Vâlcea
25	CB	Mihaela Ani Senocico	14 December 1981 (aged 26)	1.74 m	58	84	(Romania) U Jolidon Cluj Napoca
99	LB	Narcisa Lecusanu	14 September 1976 (aged 31)	1.84 m	73	86	(Romania) CS Oltchim Râmnicu Vâlcea

Group play

Team	Pld	W	D	L	GF	GA	GD	Pts	Qualification
Norway	5	5	0	0	154	106	+48	10	Qualified for the quarterfinals
Romania	5	4	0	1	150	112	+38	8	Qualified for the quarterfinals
China	5	2	0	3	122	135	−13	4	Qualified for the quarterfinals
France	5	2	0	3	121	128	−7	4	Qualified for the quarterfinals
Kazakhstan	5	1	1	3	109	137	−28	3	
Angola	5	0	1	4	109	147	−38	1	

9 August 2008; 14:00	Romania	31 – 19	Kazakhstan	Olympic Sports Centre Gymnasium; Referees: Aires Menezes, Aparecido Pinto (BRA)
9 August 2008; 14:00	Ardean-Elisei 6	(13–10)	Ajiderskaya 10	Olympic Sports Centre Gymnasium; Referees: Aires Menezes, Aparecido Pinto (BRA)
9 August 2008; 14:00	4× (yellow card) 5× (suspension) 1× (red card)	Report	3× (yellow card) 7× (suspension)	Olympic Sports Centre Gymnasium; Referees: Aires Menezes, Aparecido Pinto (BRA)

11 August 2008; 19:00	China	20 – 34	Romania	Olympic Sports Centre Gymnasium; Referees: Liudownyk, Vakula (UKR)
11 August 2008; 19:00	Wei Qiuxiang 6	(11–17)	Amariei 9	Olympic Sports Centre Gymnasium; Referees: Liudownyk, Vakula (UKR)
11 August 2008; 19:00	3× (yellow card) 3× (suspension)	Report	3× (yellow card) 5× (suspension)	Olympic Sports Centre Gymnasium; Referees: Liudownyk, Vakula (UKR)

13 August 2008; 10:45	Romania	34 – 26	France	Olympic Sports Centre Gymnasium; Referees: Lemme, Ullrich (GER)
13 August 2008; 10:45	Maier 11	(17–13)	Tervel 6	Olympic Sports Centre Gymnasium; Referees: Lemme, Ullrich (GER)
13 August 2008; 10:45	3× (yellow card) 3× (suspension)	Report	3× (yellow card) 4× (suspension)	Olympic Sports Centre Gymnasium; Referees: Lemme, Ullrich (GER)

15 August 2008; 15:45	Romania	28 – 23	Angola	Olympic Sports Centre Gymnasium; Referees: Aires Menezes, Aparecido Pinto (BRA)
15 August 2008; 15:45	Maier 7	(16–7)	Almeida 8	Olympic Sports Centre Gymnasium; Referees: Aires Menezes, Aparecido Pinto (BRA)
15 August 2008; 15:45	2× (yellow card) 3× (suspension)	Report	3× (yellow card) 2× (suspension)	Olympic Sports Centre Gymnasium; Referees: Aires Menezes, Aparecido Pinto (BRA)

17 August 2008; 14:00	Norway	24 – 23	Romania	Olympic Sports Centre Gymnasium; Referees: Chernega, Poladenko (RUS)
17 August 2008; 14:00	Johansen, Lybekk 4	(12–11)	Amariei, Stanca-Gâlcă 5	Olympic Sports Centre Gymnasium; Referees: Chernega, Poladenko (RUS)
17 August 2008; 14:00	2× (yellow card) 4× (suspension)	Report	4× (yellow card) 6× (suspension) 1× (red card)	Olympic Sports Centre Gymnasium; Referees: Chernega, Poladenko (RUS)

Quarterfinal

19 August 2008; 14:15	Romania	30 – 34	Hungary	Olympic Sports Centre Gymnasium; Referees: Liudowyk, Vakula (UKR)
19 August 2008; 14:15	Maier 11	(14–16)	Kovacsicz 7	Olympic Sports Centre Gymnasium; Referees: Liudowyk, Vakula (UKR)
19 August 2008; 14:15	3× (yellow card) 7× (suspension) 1× (red card)	Report	3× (yellow card) 2× (suspension)	Olympic Sports Centre Gymnasium; Referees: Liudowyk, Vakula (UKR)

Classification semifinal

21 August 2008
14:15
Romania
34 – 36 (ET)
France
Beijing National Indoor Stadium
Referees: Līcis, Stoļarovs (LAT)
Maier 9
(13–12)
Baudouin 7
4× (yellow card) 8× (suspension)
Report
4× (yellow card) 8× (suspension)

FT: 27–27 ET: 4–4, 3–5

7th–8th place

23 August 2008; 08:00	Sweden	30 – 34	Romania	Beijing National Indoor Stadium; Referees: Elmoamli, Shaban Ali (EGY)
23 August 2008; 08:00	Gulldén 9	(15–17)	Meirosu, Stanca-Gâlcă 6	Beijing National Indoor Stadium; Referees: Elmoamli, Shaban Ali (EGY)
23 August 2008; 08:00	4× (yellow card) 4× (suspension)	Report	3× (yellow card) 2× (suspension)	Beijing National Indoor Stadium; Referees: Elmoamli, Shaban Ali (EGY)

== Judo ==
Athlete	Event	Round of 32	Round of 16	Quarterfinals	Semifinals	Repechage 1	Repechage 2	Repechage 3	Final / BM	
Athlete	Event	Opposition Result	Opposition Result	Opposition Result	Opposition Result	Opposition Result	Opposition Result	Opposition Result	Opposition Result	Rank
Daniel Brata	Men's −100 kg	Kurbanov (UZB); W 1000–0001	Morgan (CAN); W 1000–0000	Miraliyev (AZE); L 0000–0110	Did not advance	Bye	Zhorzholiani (GEO); L 0000–1001	Did not advance		
Alina Dumitru	Women's −48 kg	Bye	Csernoviczki (HUN); W 0101–0010	Kim Y-R (KOR); W 1000–0000	Tani (JPN); W 0100–0010	Bye			Bermoy (CUB); W 1100–0000	1st place, gold medalist(s)

== Rowing ==
Romania qualified the following boats:

Women

Athlete	Event	Heats		Repechage		Final	
Athlete	Event	Time	Rank	Time	Rank	Time	Rank
Georgeta Andrunache; Viorica Susanu	Pair	7:22.69	1 FA	Bye		7:20.60	1st place, gold medalist(s)
Roxana Cogianu; Ionelia Neacșu	Double sculls	7:12.17	4 R	7:01.69	3 FB	7:20.99	9
Georgeta Andrunache; Enikő Barabás; Constanța Burcică; Elena Georgescu; Doina Ignat; Simona Mușat; Ioana Papuc; Rodica Șerban; Viorica Susanu	Eight	6:05.77	1 FA	Bye		6:07.25	3rd place, bronze medalist(s)

Qualification Legend: FA=Final A (medal); FB=Final B (non-medal); FC=Final C (non-medal); FD=Final D (non-medal); FE=Final E (non-medal); FF=Final F (non-medal); SA/B=Semifinals A/B; SC/D=Semifinals C/D; SE/F=Semifinals E/F; QF=Quarterfinals; R=Repechage

== Shooting ==
Men

Athlete	Event	Qualification		Final	
Athlete	Event	Points	Rank	Points	Rank
Alin Moldoveanu	10 m air rifle	596	3 Q	698.9	4
Iulian Raicea	10 m air pistol	567	44	Did not advance	
Iulian Raicea	25 m rapid fire pistol	576	9	Did not advance	
Ioan Toman	Skeet	108	35	Did not advance	

Women

Athlete	Event	Qualification		Final	
Athlete	Event	Points	Rank	Points	Rank
Lucia Mihalache	Skeet	66	10	Did not advance	

== Swimming ==
Men

Athlete	Event	Heat		Semifinal		Final	
Athlete	Event	Time	Rank	Time	Rank	Time	Rank
Dragoș Coman	400 m freestyle	3:47.79	17	—N/a		Did not advance	
Dragoș Coman	1500 m freestyle	15:24.05	28	—N/a		Did not advance	
Răzvan Florea	100 m backstroke	54.89	=20	Did not advance			
Răzvan Florea	200 m backstroke	1:57.97	10 Q	1:56.45 NR	5 Q	1:56.52	7
Ioan Gherghel	100 m butterfly	52.50 NR	28	Did not advance			
Ioan Gherghel	200 m butterfly	1:56.09 NR	13 Q	1:56.57	14	Did not advance	
Valentin Preda	100 m breaststroke	1:01.77	=31	Did not advance			
Valentin Preda	200 m breaststroke	DNS		Did not advance			
Norbert Trandafir	50 m freestyle	22.80	43	Did not advance			
Norbert Trandafir	100 m freestyle	50.74	50	Did not advance			
Răzvan Florea; Ioan Gherghel; Valentin Preda; Norbert Trandafir	4 × 100 m medley relay	3:38.00	13	—N/a		Did not advance	

Women

Athlete	Event	Heat		Semifinal		Final	
Athlete	Event	Time	Rank	Time	Rank	Time	Rank
Camelia Potec	200 m freestyle	1:57:65	9 Q	1:57.71	6 Q	1:56.87	5
Camelia Potec	400 m freestyle	4:04.55	7 Q	—N/a		4:04.66	6
Camelia Potec	800 m freestyle	8:19.70	2 Q	—N/a		8:23.11	4

== Table tennis ==
Singles

Athlete	Event	Preliminary round	Round 1	Round 2	Round 3	Round 4	Quarterfinals	Semifinals	Final / BM	
Athlete	Event	Opposition Result	Opposition Result	Opposition Result	Opposition Result	Opposition Result	Opposition Result	Opposition Result	Opposition Result	Rank
Adrian Crișan	Men's singles	Bye		Lin J (DOM); W 4–1	Ovtcharov (GER); L 3–4	Did not advance				
Daniela Dodean	Women's singles	Bye		Kim J (PRK); L 1–4	Did not advance					
Elizabeta Samara	Women's singles	Bye	Yang F (CGO); W 4–1	Pavlovich (BLR); L 1–4	Did not advance					

Team

Athlete	Event	Group round		Semifinals	Bronze playoff 1	Bronze playoff 2	Bronze medal	Final	
Athlete	Event	Opposition Result	Rank	Opposition Result	Opposition Result	Opposition Result	Opposition Result	Opposition Result	Rank
Daniela Dodean; Iulia Necula; Elizabeta Samara	Women's team	Group C Hong Kong; L 0 – 3 Poland; W 3 – 2 Germany; W 3 – 0	2	Did not advance	United States; L 1 – 3	Did not advance			

== Tennis ==
Athlete	Event	Round of 64	Round of 32	Round of 16	Quarterfinals	Semifinals	Final / BM	
Athlete	Event	Opposition Score	Opposition Score	Opposition Score	Opposition Score	Opposition Score	Opposition Score	Rank
Victor Hănescu	Men's singles	Bolelli (ITA); W 7–5, 3–6, 6–4	Monfils (FRA); L 4–6, 6–7^{(5–7)}	Did not advance				
Sorana Cîrstea	Women's singles	Pe'er (ISR); L 3–6, 7–5, 0–6	Did not advance					

== Weightlifting ==
Athlete	Event	Snatch		Clean & Jerk		Total	Rank
Athlete	Event	Result	Rank	Result	Rank	Total	Rank
Antoniu Buci	Men's −62 kg	130	4	165	3	295	4
Răzvan Martin	Men's −69 kg	130	23	158	18	288	19
Alexandru Roșu	Men's −69 kg	136	14	~~165~~	DNF	136	DNF
Răzvan Rusu	Men's −77 kg	140	22	170	18	310	18
Roxana Cocoș	Women's −58 kg	89	10	115	8	204	8

== Wrestling ==
Key:

- VT - Victory by Fall.
- PP - Decision by Points - the loser with technical points.
- PO - Decision by Points - the loser without technical points.

Men's freestyle

Athlete	Event	Qualification	Round of 16	Quarterfinal	Semifinal	Repechage 1	Repechage 2	Final / BM	
Athlete	Event	Opposition Result	Opposition Result	Opposition Result	Opposition Result	Opposition Result	Opposition Result	Opposition Result	Rank
Petru Toarcă	−55 kg	Bye	Gochashvili (GEO); L 0–3 ^{PO}	Did not advance					18
Gheorghiță Ștefan	−74 kg	Bye	Tigiev (UZB); L 0–3 ^{PO}	Did not advance		Bye	Bentinidis (GRE); W 3–1 ^{PP}	Haidarau (BLR); L 1–3 ^{PP}	3rd place, bronze medalist(s)
Rareș Chintoan	−120 kg	Bye	Rodríguez (CUB); L 0–3 ^{PO}	Did not advance					18

- Gheorghiță Ștefan originally finished fifth, but in November 2016, he was promoted to bronze due to disqualification of Soslan Tigiev.

Men's Greco-Roman

Athlete	Event	Qualification	Round of 16	Quarterfinal	Semifinal	Repechage 1	Repechage 2	Final / BM	
Athlete	Event	Opposition Result	Opposition Result	Opposition Result	Opposition Result	Opposition Result	Opposition Result	Opposition Result	Rank
Virgil Munteanu	−55 kg	Bye	Mango (USA); L 1–3 ^{PP}	Did not advance					12
Eusebiu Diaconu	−60 kg	El Gharably (EGY); W 3–1 ^{PP}	Rahimov (AZE); L 1–3 ^{PP}	Did not advance		Sheng J (CHN); L 1–3 ^{PP}	Did not advance		8
Ion Panait	−66 kg	Bye	Li Yy (CHN); L 1–3 ^{PP}	Did not advance					13

Women's freestyle

Athlete	Event	Qualification	Round of 16	Quarterfinal	Semifinal	Repechage 1	Repechage 2	Final / BM	
Athlete	Event	Opposition Result	Opposition Result	Opposition Result	Opposition Result	Opposition Result	Opposition Result	Opposition Result	Rank
Estera Dobre	−48 kg	Bye	Medrano (ESA); L 1–3 ^{PP}	Did not advance					10
Ana Maria Pavăl	−55 kg	—N/a	Xu L (CHN); L 0–3 ^{PO}	Did not advance		Bye	Smirnova (KAZ); W 3–1 ^{PP}	Rentería (COL); L 0–5 ^{VT}	5

== See also ==
- Romania at the 2008 Summer Paralympics
