= Rowing at the 2008 Summer Olympics – Women's coxless pair =

Women's coxless pair at the Games of the XXIX Olympiad

Medalists
1st place, gold medalist(s)		Georgeta Damian; Viorica Susanu	Romania
2nd place, silver medalist(s)		Wu You; Gao Yulan	China
3rd place, bronze medalist(s)		Yuliya Bichyk; Natallia Helakh	Belarus

Women's coxless pair competition at the 2008 Summer Olympics in Beijing was held between August 9 and 16 at the Shunyi Olympic Rowing-Canoeing Park.

This rowing event is a sweep rowing event, meaning that each boat rower has one oar and rows on only one side. The crew consists of two rowers, with no coxswain used. The competition consists of multiple rounds. Finals were held to determine the placing of each boat; these finals were given letters with those nearer to the beginning of the alphabet meaning a better ranking.

During the first round two heats were held. The top boats in each heat advanced directly to the A final, while all of the other boats were sent to the repechage. Two repechage heats were held, with the top two boats in each of the repechage heats going on to the A final. The remaining finishers in the repechages competed in the B final.

The A final determined the medals, along with other rankings through 6th place. The B final determined the remaining (7th through 10th) places.

== Schedule ==
All times are China Standard Time (UTC+8)

Date	Time	Round
Saturday, August 9, 2008	15:50-16:10	Heats
Tuesday, August 12, 2008	17:20-17:40	Repechages
Friday, August 15, 2008	17:10-17:20	Final B
Saturday, August 16, 2008	16:10-16:20	Final A

== Results ==
=== Heats ===
- Qualification Rules: 1->FA, 2..->R

==== Heat 1 ====
Rank	Rowers	Country	Time	Notes
1	Yuliya Bichyk, Natallia Helakh	Belarus	7:24.47	FA
2	Juliette Haigh, Nicky Coles	New Zealand	7:31.45	R
3	Wu You, Gao Yulan	China	7:32.50	R
4	Kim Crow, Sarah Cook	Australia	7:44.04	R
5	Zoë Hoskins, Sabrina Kolker	Canada	Boat under weight	R

==== Heat 2 ====
Rank	Rowers	Country	Time	Notes
1	Georgeta Andrunache, Viorica Susanu	Romania	7:22.69	FA
2	Lenka Wech, Maren Derlien	Germany	7:28.66	R
3	Louisa Reeve, Olivia Whitlam	Great Britain	7:29.88	R
4	Portia McGee, Anne Cummins	United States	7:29.95	R
5	Inène Pascal-Pretre, Stéphanie Dechand	France	7:42.92	R

=== Repechages ===
- Qualification Rules: 1-2->FA, 3..->FB

==== Repechage 1 ====
Rank	Rowers	Country	Time	Notes
1	Juliette Haigh, Nicky Coles	New Zealand	7:32.64	FA
2	Louisa Reeve, Olivia Whitlam	Great Britain	7:34.54	FA
3	Kim Crow, Sarah Cook	Australia	7:38.48	FB
4	Inene Pascal-Pretre, Stephanie Dechand	France	7:41.87	FB

==== Repechage 2 ====
Rank	Rowers	Country	Time	Notes
1	Wu You, Gao Yulan	China	7:23.71	FA
2	Lenka Wech, Maren Derlien	Germany	7:27.02	FA
3	Portia McGee, Anne Cummins	United States	7:32.26	FB
4	Zoe Hoskins, Sabrina Kolker	Canada	7:40.22	FB

=== Final B ===
Rank	Rowers	Country	Time	Notes
1	Portia McGee, Anne Cummins	United States	7:33.17	
2	Inene Pascal-Pretre, Stephanie Dechand	France	7:36.25	
3	Zoe Hoskins, Sabrina Kolker	Canada	7:37.27	
4	Kim Crow, Sarah Cook	Australia	7:40.93	

=== Final A ===
Rank	Rowers	Country	Time	Notes
Gold medal	Georgeta Andrunache, Viorica Susanu	Romania	7:20.60	
Silver medal	Wu You, Gao Yulan	China	7:22.28	
Bronze medal	Yuliya Bichyk, Natallia Helakh	Belarus	7:22.91	
4	Lenka Wech, Maren Derlien	Germany	7:25.73	
5	Juliette Haigh, Nicky Coles	New Zealand	7:28.80	
6	Louisa Reeve, Olivia Whitlam	Great Britain	7:33.61	
