= Rowing at the 2004 Summer Olympics – Women's coxless pair =

Women's coxless pair at the Games of the XXVIII Olympiad

Medalists
| 1st place, gold medalist(s) | | Georgeta Damian; Viorica Susanu | Romania |
| 2nd place, silver medalist(s) | | Katherine Grainger; Cath Bishop | Great Britain |
| 3rd place, bronze medalist(s) | | Yuliya Bichyk; Natallia Helakh | Belarus |

These are the results of the Women's coxless pair competition, one of six events for female competitors in Rowing at the 2004 Summer Olympics in Athens.

== Women's Pair ==
| Gold: | Silver: | Bronze: |
|---|---|---|
| Romania; Georgeta Damian; Viorica Susanu | Great Britain; Katherine Grainger; Cath Bishop | Belarus; Yuliya Bichyk; Natallia Helakh |

=== Heats ===
10 boats competed in two heats on 14 August, 2004. The top 3 pairs from each heat advanced to the final.

=== Heat 1 ===
| Rank | Athlete Name | Country | Time |
|---|---|---|---|
| 1 | Yuliya Bichyk and Natallia Helakh | Belarus | 7:27.73 |
| 2 | Katherine Grainger and Cath Bishop | Great Britain | 7:34.66 |
| 3 | Maren Derlien and Sandra Goldbach | Germany | 7:44.00 |
| 4 | Sophie Balmary and Virginie Chauvel | France | 7:49.70 |
| 5 | Sarah Jones and Kate Mackenzie | United States | 7:53.78 |

=== Heat 2 ===
| Rank | Athlete Name | Country | Time |
|---|---|---|---|
| 1 | Georgeta Damian and Viorica Susanu | Romania | 7:29.74 |
| 2 | Darcy Marquardt and Buffy Williams | Canada | 7:42.36 |
| 3 | Milka Tancheva and Anna Chuk | Bulgaria | 7:52.45 |
| 4 | Cong Huanling and Feng Xueling | China | 7:53.30 |
| 5 | Juliette Haigh and Nicky Coles | New Zealand | 9:37.53 |

=== Final ===
| Rank | Athlete Name | Country | Time |
|---|---|---|---|
| 1st place, gold medalist(s) | Georgeta Damian and Viorica Susanu | Romania | 7:06.56 |
| 2nd place, silver medalist(s) | Katherine Grainger and Cath Bishop | Great Britain | 7:08.66 |
| 3rd place, bronze medalist(s) | Yuliya Bichyk and Natallia Helakh | Belarus | 7:09.36 |
| 4 | Darcy Marquardt and Buffy Williams | Canada | 7:13.33 |
| 5 | Maren Derlien and Sandra Goldbach | Germany | 7:20.20 |
| 6 | Juliette Haigh and Nicky Coles | New Zealand | 7:23.52 |

The Romanians never looked likely to lose as they led throughout. At 1,000 metres they were nearly two seconds clear of the Canadians who were half a second ahead of Belarus with world champions Great Britain a further second back. By 1,500 m. they had extended their lead with no change in positions in the trailing pack. Just after this mark Belarus and Great Britain both made a move to push past Canada who could not respond. The British kept their push going and passed the Belarusians and by the finishing line had just about overlapped the dominant Romanians. Belarus were two thirds of length back with a very tired looking Canada a further one and a half lengths away.
