= Katherine Grainger =

Scottish rower (born 1975)

The Right Honourable The Baroness Grainger DBE OLY
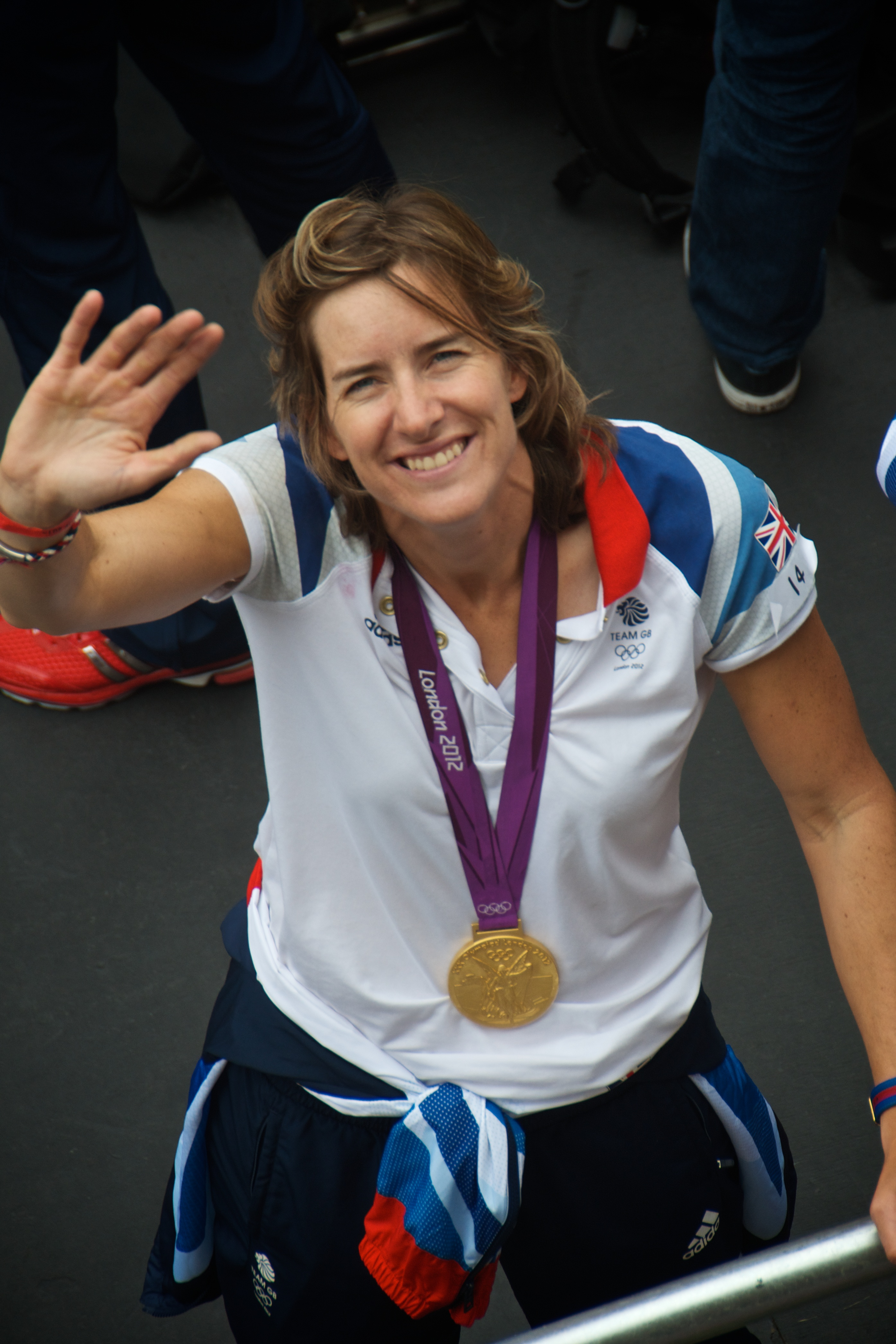
- Grainger with her Olympic gold medal

Personal information
- Born: Katherine Jane Grainger; 12 November 1975 (age 51) Glasgow, Scotland
- Education: University of Edinburgh (LLB); University of Glasgow (MPhil); King's College London (PhD)
- Height: 1.82 m (5 ft 11 1/2 in)
- Website: katherinegrainger.com

Chancellor of University of Glasgow
- Incumbent
- Assumed office 15 June 2020

Chancellor of Oxford Brookes University
- In office 20 March 2015 – 15 June 2020
- Vice Chancellor: Alistair Fitt
- Preceded by: Shami Chakrabarti
- Succeeded by: Paterson Joseph

Member of the House of Lords
- Lord Temporal
- Life peerage 20 April 2026

Personal details
- Party: Crossbencher

Sport
- Country: United Kingdom
- Sport: Women's rowing
- Event: Double Sculls
- College team: Edinburgh University Boat Club
- Club: St Andrew Boat Club
- Coached by: Paul Thompson
Medal record
Women's rowing
Representing Great Britain
Event	1st	2nd	3rd
Olympic Games	1	4	0
World Championships	6	1	1
European Championships	0	0	1
Total	7	5	2
Olympic Games
Gold medal – first place	2012 London	Double sculls
Silver medal – second place	2000 Sydney	Quadruple sculls
Silver medal – second place	2004 Athens	Coxless pair
Silver medal – second place	2008 Beijing	Quadruple sculls
Silver medal – second place	2016 Rio de Janeiro	Double sculls
World Championships
Gold medal – first place	2003 Milan	Coxless pair
Gold medal – first place	2005 Gifu	Quadruple sculls
Gold medal – first place	2006 Eton	Quadruple sculls
Gold medal – first place	2007 Munich	Quadruple sculls
Gold medal – first place	2010 Karapiro	Double sculls
Gold medal – first place	2011 Bled	Double sculls
Silver medal – second place	2009 Poznań	Single scull
Bronze medal – third place	1997 Aiguebelette	Eight
European Championships
Bronze medal – third place	2015 Poznan	Double sculls

Katherine Jane Grainger, Baroness Grainger (born 12 November 1975), is a Scottish academic and former athlete. She is a 2012 Summer Olympics gold medallist, four-time Olympic silver medallist and six-time World Champion for Great Britain. She served as Chancellor of Oxford Brookes University between 2015 and 2020 and is currently Chancellor of the University of Glasgow.

Grainger first won silver at the Sydney Olympics in 2000 in the woman's quadruple sculls. In Athens in 2004, she won silver in the coxless pairs. In Beijing 2008 she won her third silver, again in the quadruple sculls.

At the London Olympics 2012, Anna Watkins and Grainger broke the Olympic record as they qualified for the double sculls final, before winning the gold medal. Grainger won a silver medal at the Rio Olympic Games 2016 with Victoria Thornley, after a two-year break from the sport. Grainger won eight medals at the World Championship between 1997 and 2011.

== Early life and education ==
Born in Glasgow in 1975, she attended Mosshead Primary School prior to attending Bearsden Academy in East Dunbartonshire near Glasgow. Grainger's family later moved to Netherley, Aberdeenshire.

Grainger holds a Bachelor of Laws (LLB) degree from the University of Edinburgh, a Master of Philosophy (MPhil) degree in medical law and medical ethics from the University of Glasgow, and a Doctor of Philosophy degree in law from King's College London. Her doctoral research (on "the genesis and challenges of the whole life order, introduced in the Criminal Justice Act 2003, under which those sentenced face life-long incarceration with no possibility of release") was supervised by Elaine Player and Ben Bowling. In July 2013, King's made Grainger a fellow. She remarked: "Without planning it both my Olympic career and my PhD have met at the same time and the culmination for both is 2012 – not by design."

== Career ==
=== Rowing ===
Grainger took up rowing at the University of Edinburgh in 1993 and represented Edinburgh's St Andrew Boat Club and/or Marlow Rowing Club in rowing events. She trained on the River Dee. She first won silver at Sydney in 2000 in the woman's quadruple sculls with Guin Batten, Gillian Lindsay and Miriam Batten losing to a German team. Four years later in Athens in 2004, she won silver again when she took part in the coxless pairs with Cath Bishop, losing to Georgeta Damian and Viorica Susanu of Romania. She returned to the quadruple sculls in Beijing 2008, when she won her third silver with Annabel Vernon, Debbie Flood and Frances Houghton, narrowly losing to China after taking the lead for some of the race. On 3 August 2012, she won an Olympic gold medal at London in the double sculls with Anna Watkins. At the 2016 Olympics, she won a silver medal in double sculls with Vicky Thornley.

Grainger has won eight medals at the World Championships. The first of these was a bronze in 1997 in the eight, then a gold with Bishop in 2003, a gold in 2005 with the quadruple scull, with Houghton, Sarah Winckless, and Rebecca Romero, and in 2006 her quadruple scull was promoted to gold following a drugs test on the winning Russian crew. This quad had Debbie Flood instead of Romero, who had retired after the 2005 world championships.

Another gold came in 2007, again in the quadruple sculls, with Annabel Vernon replacing the injured Sarah Winckless. In 2009, having switched to the single scull after the Beijing Olympics, Grainger claimed a surprise silver at the World Championships in Poland. In 2010, Grainger teamed up with Anna Watkins in the double sculls and they embarked on an unbeaten season, culminating in victory in November in the World Championships in Lake Karapiro, New Zealand, and then defending the title in an injury disrupted season in 2011 in Bled, Slovenia. She has won the Rowing World Cup in the quadruple sculls in 2005, 2006, 2007 and 2010 and the double sculls in 2010, 2011 and 2012.

On 14 March 2015, Grainger was part of the composite crew that won the Women's Eights Head of the River Race on the River Thames in London, setting a time of 18:58.6 for the 4 1/4-mile (6.8-kilometre) championship course from Mortlake to Putney. Her GB rowing team senior final trials results include:

- 2015 – 2nd, Single Scull
- 2012 – 1st, Single Scull
- 2011 – 2nd, Single Scull
- 2004–2010 – 1st, Single Scull
- 2001 – 1st, Double Scull
- 1998 – 1st, Single Scull

Following retirement, Grainger also regularly raced at the HOCR in Boston in a "Director's Challenge Mixed 8" made up of a crew containing several past rowing Olympians and in 2019 they placed 1st in this event.

=== Administration ===
In April 2017, Grainger was appointed chair of UK Sport. She was reappointed for a second term on 1 July 2021. In March 2015, Grainger was appointed the fourth chancellor of Oxford Brookes University, at a ceremony joined by her three predecessors, Shami Chakrabarti, Jon Snow and Baroness Kennedy of The Shaws.

On 28 November 2024, it was announced that Grainger would become the new chair of the British Olympic Association (BOA) on completion of her final term as chair of UK Sport in 2025. She will replace the incumbent Sir Hugh Robertson, becoming the first female chair of the BOA since its establishment in 1905.

=== Charity work ===
Grainger is a board member for the Youth Sport Trust, the British Olympic Association's Athlete Commission and is a Patron for Netball Scotland, Winning Scotland, the NCI and Aberlour children's charity.

Grainger was previously a board member of International Inspiration (2012–2017), a charity that promoted access to sport, play, and physical exercise for low- and middle-income families with children around the world. It was the first international development legacy initiative linked to an Olympic and Paralympic Games. International Inspiration's board members included British broadcaster David Davies, former UK government minister Andrew Mitchell, and Sebastian Coe.

In 2014, she judged the category prize "dreams" for the Koestler Trust's annual exhibition "Catching Dreams", curated by previous Koestler award entrants. The exhibition at the Southbank Centre presented art works by prisoners, detainees and ex-offenders.

=== House of Lords ===
On 17 June 2025, it was announced that she was to be awarded a life peerage, and would sit in the House of Lords as a crossbencher. Almost a year after her peerage was announced, she was created as Baroness Grainger, of Garelochhead in the County of Dunbartonshire on 20 April 2026.

== Honours and awards ==
Grainger was elected President of the Edinburgh University Boat Club in 1996/97. She twice received the Edinburgh University Sports Union's Eva Bailey Cup for the university's most outstanding female athlete in 1995/96 and 1996/97 and was inducted to the University's Sports Hall of Fame on 29 May 2008.

She was elected as honorary president of the Scottish Amateur Rowing Association in November 2005, and a steward of Henley Royal Regatta in 2008, only the third rower to be elected while still competing.

She was appointed a Member of the Order of the British Empire (MBE) in the 2006 Birthday Honours for services to sport, promoted to Commander of the same Order (CBE) in the 2013 New Year Honours for services to rowing, and ultimately made a Dame Commander of the Order of the British Empire (DBE) in the 2017 New Year Honours for services to sport and charity.

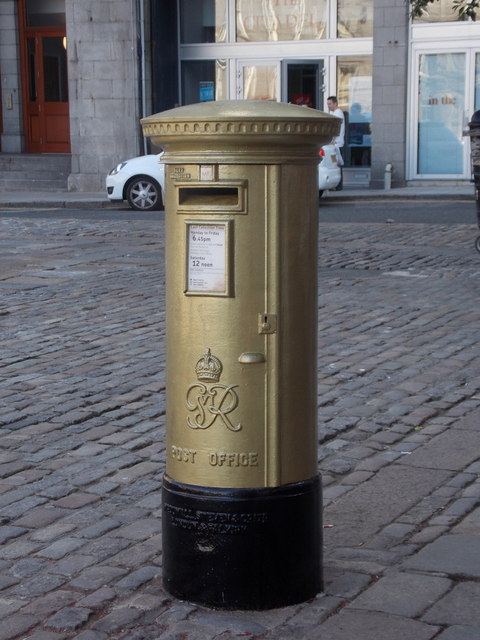
Gold postbox in Aberdeen, Scotland, painted in celebration of Grainger's 2012 Olympic gold win

In August 2012, a postbox in Aberdeen was painted gold to celebrate her 2012 Olympic gold medal.

In March 2013, she became patron of the National Coastwatch Institution.

In June 2017, Grainger was awarded an honorary doctorate by the University of Aberdeen.

In July 2017, it was announced that the trophy awarded to the winners of the Senior Women's competition at the Home International Regatta would be known as Dame Katherine Grainger Quaich. The first winners of the trophy were Scotland.

In 2020, she was appointed as the Chancellor of the University of Glasgow, in succession to Professor Sir Kenneth Calman. She is the first woman to hold the office, founded in 1451.

In January 2024, she was appointed an Honorary Colonel of the 215 (Scottish) Multirole Medical Regiment, Army Reserve.

In June 2026, Grainger was appointed Usher of the Green Rod to the Order of the Thistle, Scotland's highest order of chivalry.

Academic offices
Preceded by Sir Kenneth Calman	Chancellor of the University of Glasgow; 2020–present	Succeeded by Incumbent
