= Louisa Reeve =

British rower

Personal information
- Nationality: British
- Born: 16 May 1984 (age 42) Westminster, Greater London

Sport
- Club: Leander Club
Medal record
Women's rowing
Representing Great Britain
World Championships
Bronze medal – third place	2007 Munich	W8+
Bronze medal – third place	2011 Lake Bled	W8+
European Championships
Silver medal – second place	2014 Belgrade	W8+

Louisa Reeve (born 16 May 1984) is a British former rower. She represented Great Britain at the 2008 and 2012 Summer Olympics, and won medals at the World and European Rowing Championships.

== Early life and education ==
Reeve attended Downe House School, where she first learn to row. She studied at Durham University, and was coached as a member of the elite development squad by Wade Hall-Craggs.

== Rowing career ==
At the 2008 Summer Olympics in Beijing, Reeve competed in two events. Alongside Olivia Whitlam, she finished sixth in the women's coxless pair, and was also part of the British women's eight that finished fifth.

Reeve won a bronze medal in the women's eight at the 2011 World Rowing Championships in Bled. She returned to the Olympics in 2012, again competing in the women's eight.

In 2014, she won a silver medal in the women's eight at the 2014 European Rowing Championships in Belgrade.
