= Kate Mackenzie =

American rower

Kate MacKenzie
Personal information
- Full name: Kate MacKenzie
- Born: April 10, 1975 (age 51) Novi, Michigan, U.S.

Sport
- Country: United States
- Sport: Rowing
Medal record
Women's rowing
Representing the United States
World Championships
Gold medal – first place	2002 Seville	Eight

Kate Mackenzie (born April 10, 1975) is an American rower. She competed at the 2004 Summer Olympics in Athens, in the women's coxless pair. Mackenzie was born in Novi, Michigan.
