= Wu You =

Chinese rower

Personal information
- Born: 27 March 1984 (age 42)
Medal record
Women's Rowing
Representing China
Olympic Games
Silver medal – second place	2008 Beijing	Coxless pair

Wu You (simplified Chinese: 吴优; traditional Chinese: 吳優; pinyin: Wú Yōu; born 27 March 1984 in Jinzhou, Liaoning) is a female Chinese rower, who won silver medal in the Women's double sculls at the 2008 Summer Olympics. Her race partner was Gao Yulan.
