= Milka Tancheva =

Bulgarian rower

Personal information
- Nationality: Bulgarian
- Born: 30 August 1982 (age 42); Plovdiv, Bulgaria

Sport
- Sport: Rowing

Milka Tancheva (Bulgarian: Милка Танчева; born 30 August 1982) is a Bulgarian rower. She competed in the women's coxless pair event at the 2004 Summer Olympics.
