= Gao Yulan =

Chinese rower

Personal information
- Native name: 高玉兰
- Born: 1982 (age 43–44)
Medal record
Women's Rowing
Representing China
Olympic Games
Silver medal – second place	2008 Beijing	Coxless pair

Gao Yulan (born 3 October 1982 in Ruichang, Jiujiang, Jiangxi) is a female Chinese rower, who won silver medal in the Women's double sculls at the 2008 Summer Olympics. Her race partner was Wu You.

At the 2012 Summer Olympics, she and partner Zhang Yage did not qualify for the final.

== Records ==
- 2008 World Cup Lucerne – 1st W2-
