= Stéphanie Dechand =

French rower

Personal information
- Nationality: French
- Born: 4 January 1985 (age 40); Saint-Pol-sur-Mer, France

Sport
- Sport: Rowing

Stéphanie Dechand (born 4 January 1985) is a French rower. She competed in the women's coxless pair event at the 2008 Summer Olympics.
