= Catherine Bishop (rower) =

British rower

Cath Bishop
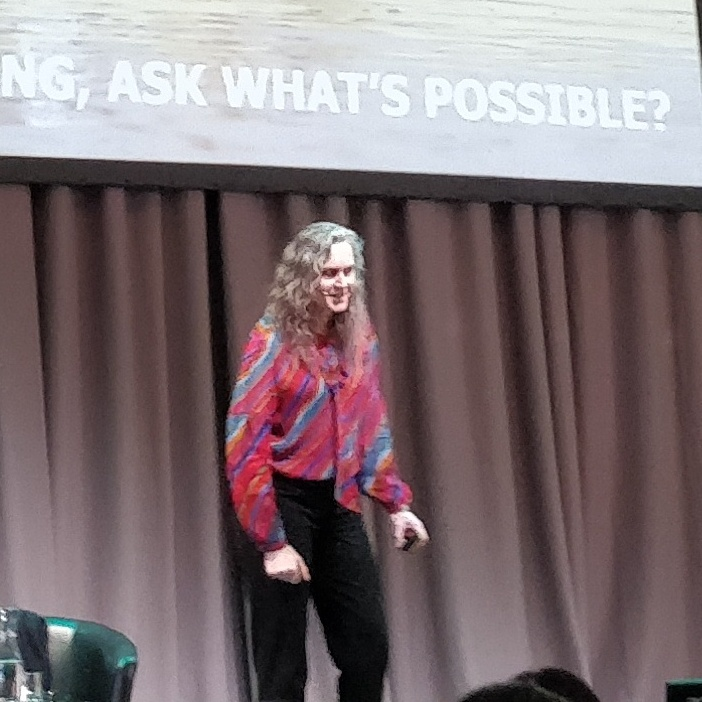
- Cath Bishop presenting at a leadership event in Edinburgh in 2020

Personal information
- Full name: Catherine Bishop
- Born: 22 November 1971 (age 54) Leigh on Sea, England
Medal record
Women's rowing
Representing Great Britain
Olympic Games
Silver medal – second place	2004 Athens	Coxless pair
World Rowing Championships
Gold medal – first place	2003 Milan	Coxless pair
Silver medal – second place	1998 Cologne	Coxless pair

Catherine Bishop (born 22 November 1971) is a former British rower. In partnership with Katherine Grainger she was World Champion in the coxless pair in 2003, and in 2004 they won a silver medal at the Olympic Games. Following a career as a diplomat she is now a leadership speaker, writer and consultant.

== Early life and education ==
Bishop was born in Leigh on Sea, England, and educated at Westcliff High School for Girls. She has a BA in modern languages from Pembroke College, Cambridge, a master's in international politics from the University of Wales, Aberystwyth and a Ph.D. in contemporary German literature from the University of Reading.

== Career ==
=== Rowing ===
Bishop won medals at the World Championships twice, a silver in 1998 in the women's pair with Dot Blackie, and gold in 2003, again in the pair, with Katherine Grainger. In 1999 she was the World Indoor Rowing Champion. She competed in the Women's Eight in the Olympic Games in Atlanta (1996), the Coxless Pair in Sydney (2000) before going on to win silver in the 2004 Olympic Games in the Women's coxless pair with Grainger.

=== Diplomacy ===
From 2001 through 2014 Bishop forged a career with the Foreign Office, for whom she worked in London; Sarajevo, Bosnia; and Basra Iraq. Her roles included : Political, projects and press officer at British Embassy, Sarajevo, from 2004; Political Adviser to the High Representative to Bosnia & Herzegovina from 2006; Head of the Political Section at the British Consulate in Basra from 2007; and Deputy Director of the Stabilisation Unit in London from 2009 to 2011.

=== Consultancy ===
Bishop now has a consultancy business specialising in leadership and team performance drawing on her successful sports career.
