= Gymnastics at the 2008 Summer Olympics – Women's floor =

Women's floor at the Games of the XXIX Olympiad

Medalists
1st place, gold medalist(s)		Sandra Izbașa	Romania
2nd place, silver medalist(s)		Shawn Johnson	United States
3rd place, bronze medalist(s)		Nastia Liukin	United States

Women's floor competition at the 2008 Summer Olympics was held on August 17 at the Beijing National Indoor Stadium.

The eight competitors (with a maximum of two per nation) with the highest scores in the qualifying round proceed to the women's floor finals.

There, each gymnast performs again; the scores from the final round (ignoring qualification) determine final ranking.

== Final ==
Position	Gymnast	Country	A Score	B Score	Penalty	Total
Gold medal	Sandra Izbașa	Romania	6.500	9.150		15.650
Silver medal	Shawn Johnson	United States	6.400	9.100		15.500
Bronze medal	Nastia Liukin	United States	6.200	9.225		15.425
4	Jiang Yuyuan	China	6.300	9.050		15.350
5	Ekaterina Kramarenko	Russia	6.100	8.925		15.025
6	Daiane dos Santos	Brazil	6.400	8.775	0.200	14.975
7	Cheng Fei	China	6.300	8.250		14.550
8	Anna Pavlova	Russia	5.800	8.325		14.125

== Qualified competitors ==
Position	Gymnast	A Score	B Score	Penalty	Total
1	Cheng Fei (CHN)	6.600	9.150		15.750
2	Sandra Izbaşa (ROU)	6.500	8.975		15.475
3	Shawn Johnson (USA)	6.300	9.125		15.425
4	Nastia Liukin (USA)	6.200	9.150		15.350
5	Daiane dos Santos (BRA)	6.400	8.975	0.100	15.275
6	Ekaterina Kramarenko (RUS)	6.100	9.050		15.150
7	Anna Pavlova (RUS)	5.900	9.225		15.125
8	Jiang Yuyuan (CHN)	6.200	8.850		15.050
