= Natallia Helakh =

Belarusian rower (born 1978)

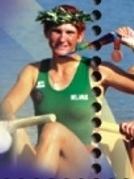
- Natallia Helakh on a 2004 Belarusian stamp

Personal information
- Born: 30 May 1978 (age 48) Brest, Belarus
- Height: 1.90 m (6 ft 3 in)
- Weight: 85 kg (187 lb)

Sport
- Sport: Rowing
- Club: Dynamo Brest
Medal record
Representing Belarus
Olympic Games
| Bronze medal – third place | 2004 Athens | Coxless pair |
| Bronze medal – third place | 2008 Beijing | Coxless pair |
World Championships
| Gold medal – first place | 2000 Zagreb | Coxless four |
| Gold medal – first place | 2007 Munich | Coxless pair |
| Gold medal – first place | 2008 Linz | Coxless four |
| Silver medal – second place | 2003 Milan | Coxless pair |
| Bronze medal – third place | 2002 Seville | Coxless pair |
European Championships
| Gold medal – first place | 2010 Montemor-o-Velho | Coxless four |
| Silver medal – second place | 2011 Plovdiv | Coxless pair |
| Silver medal – second place | 2011 Plovdiv | Eights |
| Bronze medal – third place | 2008 Marathon | Eights |

Natallia Helakh (Belarusian: Наталля Гелах; Russian: Наталья Гелах, Nataliya Gelakh; born 30 May 1978) is a Belarusian rower who competed at the 2000, 2004 and 2008 Olympics. Rowing with Yuliya Bichyk, she won a bronze medal in the coxless pairs in 2004 and 2008, and finished in fourth place in the eights in 2000. Between 2000 and 2011, Helakh and Bichyk also won nine medals at European and world championships, including four golds.
