= Inène Pascal-Pretre =

French rower

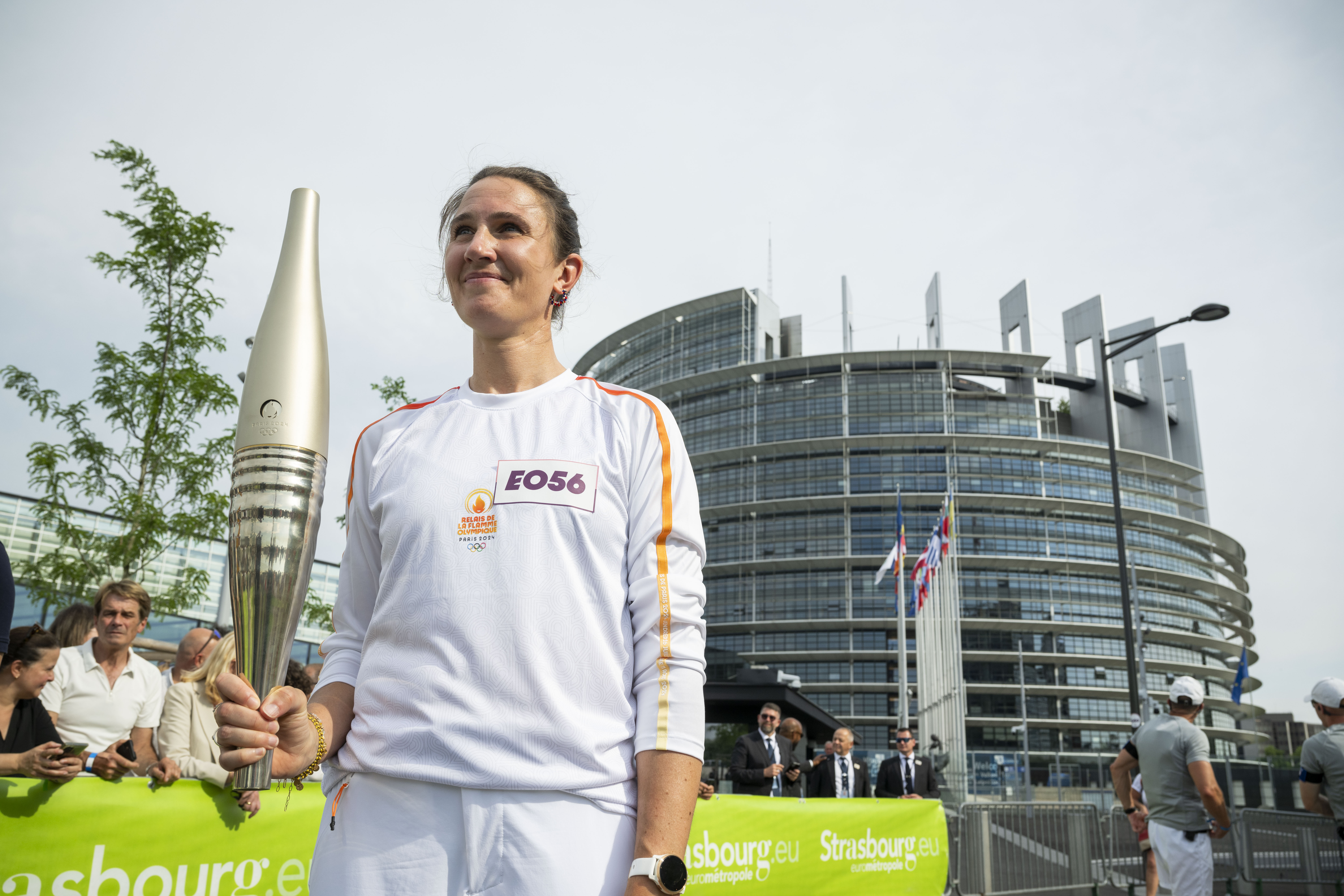
- Inène Pascal-Pretre in 2024

Personal information
- Nationality: French
- Born: 9 November 1985 (age 39); Schiltigheim, France

Sport
- Sport: Rowing

Inène Pascal-Pretre (born 9 November 1985) is a French rower. She competed in the women's coxless pair event at the 2008 Summer Olympics.
