= Virginie Chauvel =

French rower

Personal information
- Nationality: French
- Born: 25 June 1982 (age 42); Nantes, France

Sport
- Sport: Rowing

Virginie Chauvel (born 25 June 1982) is a French rower. She competed in the women's coxless pair event at the 2004 Summer Olympics.
