= Portia McGee =

American rower

Personal information
- Born: Portia Johnson McGee; March 9, 1979 (age 47)
- Height: 175 cm (5 ft 9 in)
- Weight: 70 kg (154 lb)

Sport
- Sport: Rowing
Medal record
Women's rowing
Representing United States
World Championships
Gold medal – first place	2007 Munich	W4-
Bronze medal – third place	2006 Eton	W4-
Nations Cup
Silver medal – second place	2001 Linz	BW4-
Bronze medal – third place	1999 Hamburg	BW4-
World Rowing Junior Championships
Bronze medal – third place	1997 Hazewinkel	JW8+

Portia Johnson McGee (née Johnson, born March 9, 1979) is an American rower. She has won medals at two World Rowing Championships. Together with Anna Mickelson, she competed in the women's coxless pair where they came seventh.

McGee resides in Providence, Rhode Island. She attended The Bush School in Seattle, Washington.
