= Yuliya Bichyk =

Belarusian rower (born 1983)

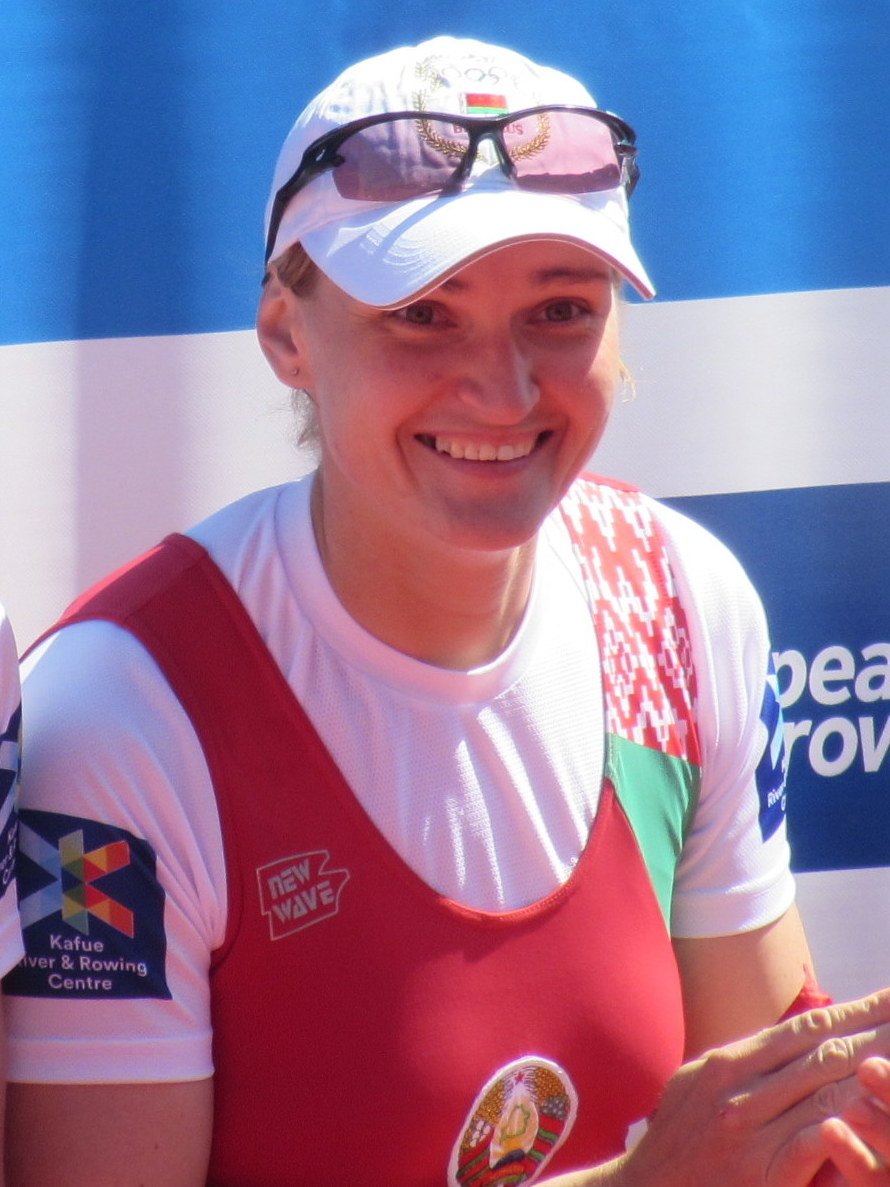
- Bichyk in 2016

Personal information
- Born: 1 April 1983 (age 43) Minsk, Belarus
- Height: 1.85 m (6 ft 1 in)
- Weight: 83 kg (183 lb)

Sport
- Sport: Rowing
- Club: Dynamo Brest; Dynamo Minsk
Medal record
Representing Belarus
Olympic Games
| Bronze medal – third place | 2004 Athens | Coxless pair |
| Bronze medal – third place | 2008 Beijing | Coxless pair |
World Championships
| Gold medal – first place | 1999 St. Catharines | W4- |
| Gold medal – first place | 2007 Munich | W2- |
| Gold medal – first place | 2008 Linz | W4- |
| Silver medal – second place | 2001 Lucerne | W2- |
| Silver medal – second place | 2003 Milan | W2- |
| Silver medal – second place | 2003 Milan | W4x |
| Bronze medal – third place | 2002 Seville | W2- |
| Bronze medal – third place | 2013 Chungju | W2x |
European Championships
| Gold medal – first place | 2014 Belgrade | W4x |
| Silver medal – second place | 2011 Plovdiv | W4- |
| Silver medal – second place | 2011 Plovdiv | Eights |
| Bronze medal – third place | 2008 Marathon | Eights |

Yuliya Bichyk (Belarusian: Юлія Бічык; Russian: Юлия Бичик, Yuliya Bichik; born 1 April 1983) is a Belarusian rower. Partnering with Natallia Helakh, she won an Olympics bronze medal in the coxless pairs in both 2004 and 2008, and finished in fourth place in the eights in 2000.
