= Anna Chuk =

Bulgarian rower

Personal information
- Nationality: Bulgarian
- Born: 29 August 1983 (age 41); Plovdiv, Bulgaria

Sport
- Sport: Rowing

Anna Chuk (born 29 August 1983) is a Bulgarian rower. She competed in the women's coxless pair event at the 2004 Summer Olympics.
