= Zoë Hoskins =

Canadian rower (born 1981)

Personal information
- Born: 17 January 1981 (age 45) Edmonton, Alberta, Canada

Sport
- Sport: Rowing
Medal record
Representing Canada
Pan American Games
Gold medal – first place	2007 Rio de Janeiro	Quadruple sculls
Silver medal – second place	2007 Rio de Janeiro	Coxless pairs

Zoë Hoskins (born 17 January 1981) is a Canadian rower. She competed in the women's coxless pair event at the 2008 Summer Olympics.
