= Feng Xueling =

Chinese rower

Personal information
- Nationality: Chinese
- Born: 3 February 1980 (age 45); Lingyuan, China

Sport
- Sport: Rowing

Feng Xueling (born 3 February 1980) is a Chinese rower. She competed in the women's coxless pair event at the 2004 Summer Olympics.
