= Valeria Motogna-Beșe =

Romanian handball player (born 1979)

Personal information
- Full name: Valeria Aurica Motogna-Beșe
- Nationality: Romanian
- Born: December 16, 1979 (age 46) Bistrița, Romania
- Height: 1.87 m (6 ft 2 in)
- Weight: 77 kg (170 lb)

Sport
- Sport: Handball
- Position: Left back / Centre back / Right back
- Current club: CSU Oradea

Senior clubs
- Years: Team
- 1994–2006: Silcotub Zalău
- 2006–2011: Oltchim Râmnicu Vâlcea
- 2011–2014: HC Zalău
- 2016–: CSU Oradea
National team
Years	Team	Apps	(Gls)
199?–2008	Romania	144	(185)

Achievements and titles
- Olympic finals: 2000 Summer Olympics; 2008 Summer Olympics

Aurica Valeria Motogna-Beşe (born 16 December 1979 in Bistriţa, Romania) is a retired Romanian handball player (left back/playmaker) who played mainly as a defender for the Romania women's national handball team. She carried the flag during the opening ceremony of the 2008 Summer Olympics in Beijing.
