= Sandra Goldbach =

German rower

Medal record

Women's rowing

Representing Germany

World Rowing Championships
Silver medal – second place	1999 St. Catharines	W4-
Bronze medal – third place	2001 Lucerne	W8+
Bronze medal – third place	2003 Milan	W4-

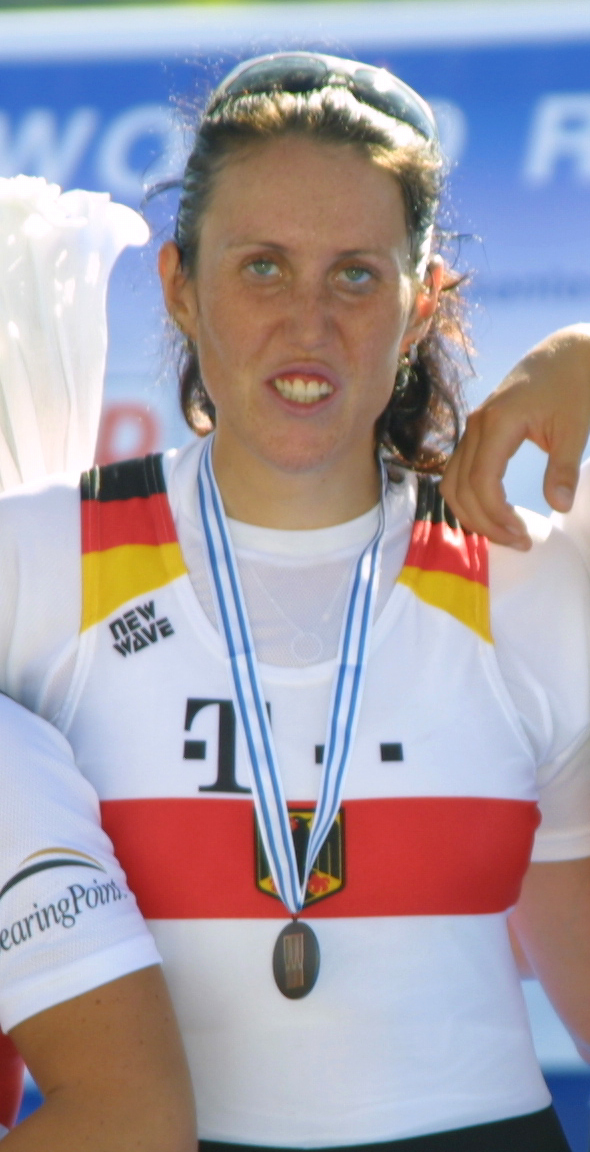
Sandra Goldbach

Sandra Goldbach (born 15 April 1977) is a German rower. She was born in Dresden.
