= Sabrina Kolker =

Canadian rower

Personal information
- Nationality: Canadian
- Born: September 14, 1980; Comox, Canada
- Height: 177 cm (5 ft 10 in)
- Weight: 73 kg (161 lb; 11 st 7 lb)

Sabrina Kolker (born September 14, 1980) is a Canadian rower who competed in the 2004 Summer Olympics in Athens and the 2008 Summer Olympics in Beijing.

Kolker was born in Comox, British Columbia, and grew up in West Vancouver. She attended high school at Phillips Exeter Academy and then attended Stanford University.
