= Olivia Whitlam =

English rower

Olivia Rose Whitlam
Personal information
- Born: September 16, 1985 (age 39)

Sport
- Sport: rower

Olivia Rose Whitlam (born 16 September 1985) is a female rower from Daresbury, near Warrington, England. She became the Under-23 World Champion in 2007 in the pairs with partner Heather Stanning. She competed in the 2008 Summer Olympics with new partner Louisa Reeve, paired together only three months before the games began. As the newest pair on the 2008 British Olympic Rowing team, they were uncertain what their expectations should be, but Olivia and Louisa surprised everyone by placing third in their heat, holding off a strong challenge by the Americans. They then made the final by placing second in the repechage ahead of Australia and France.

At the 2012 Summer Olympics, she competed as part of the GB women's eight.

A member of Agecroft Rowing Club in Salford, she, along with Richard Egington, were the first rowers from Warrington at the Olympics, having learnt to row at King's School, Chester.
