= Viorica Susanu =

Romanian rower

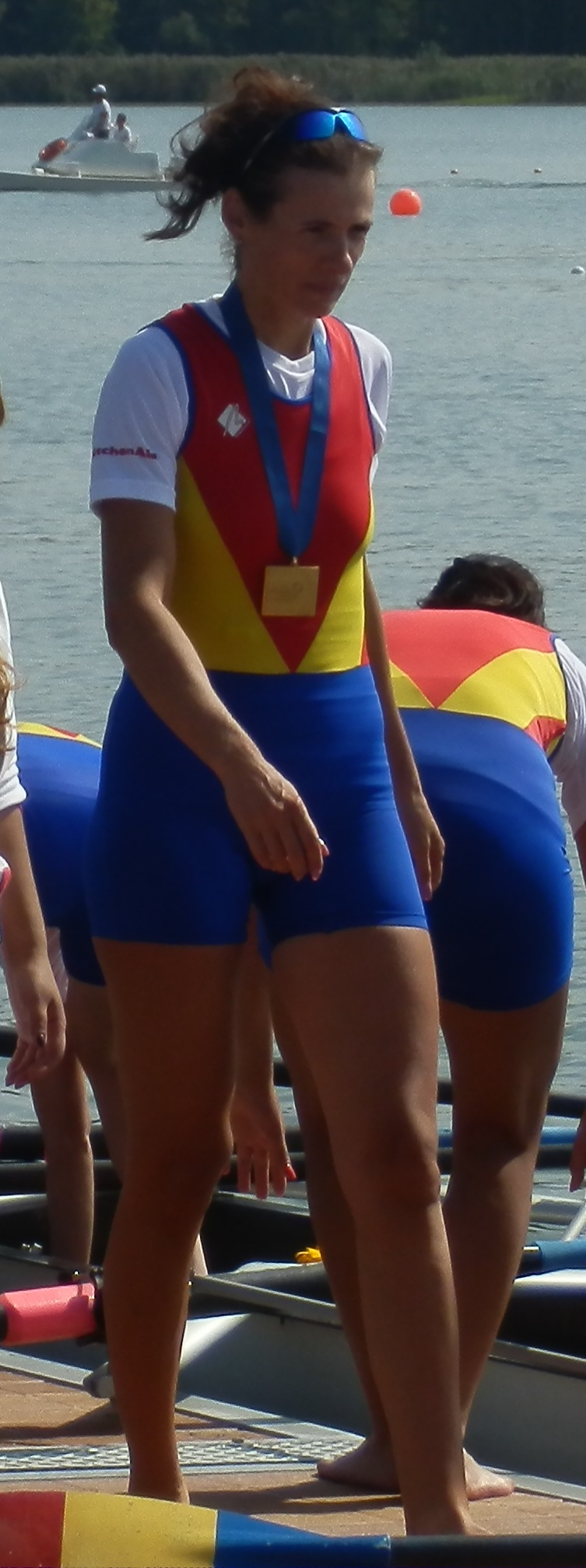

Personal information
- Born: 29 October 1975 (age 50) Galați, Romania
- Height: 186 cm (6 ft 1 in)
- Weight: 76 kg (168 lb)
Medal record
Women's rowing
Representing Romania
Olympic Games
| Gold medal – first place | 2000 Sydney | Eight |
| Gold medal – first place | 2004 Athens | Eight |
| Gold medal – first place | 2004 Athens | Coxless pair |
| Gold medal – first place | 2008 Beijing | Coxless pair |
| Bronze medal – third place | 2008 Beijing | Eight |
World Championships
| Gold medal – first place | 1997 Lac d'Aiguebelette | Eight |
| Gold medal – first place | 1998 Cologne | Eight |
| Gold medal – first place | 1999 St. Catharines | Eight |
| Gold medal – first place | 2001 Lucerne | Coxless pair |
| Gold medal – first place | 2002 Seville | Coxless pair |
| Silver medal – second place | 2003 Milan | Eight |
| Silver medal – second place | 2001 Lucerne | Eight |
| Silver medal – second place | 2007 Munich | Eight |
| Bronze medal – third place | 2003 Milan | Coxless pair |
| Bronze medal – third place | 2007 Munich | Coxless pair |
| Bronze medal – third place | 1997 Lac d'Aiguebelette | Double Sculls |
European Championships
| Gold medal – first place | 2007 Poznań | Eight |
| Gold medal – first place | 2008 Marathon | Coxless pair |

Viorica Susanu (born 29 October 1975) is a Romanian rower and winner of four Olympic Gold medals.

Susanu rowed in the Romanian women's eight that won the World Rowing Championships in 1997, 1998 and 1999, and the 2000 Summer Olympics. In 2001 and 2002, rowing with Georgeta Damian, she won the World Championships in the women's pair, setting a world's best time in 2002, while continuing to row in the eight. At the 2004 Summer Olympics, she won gold medals in both the pair and the eight, and in 2008 the pair.

== Medals at Olympic Games ==
- 2000 Summer Olympics

1st, Women's Eight

- 2004 Summer Olympics

1st, Women's Eight
1st, Women's Pair

- 2008 Summer Olympics

1st, Coxless pair
3rd, Women's Eight

== Medals at World Championships ==
- 1997

1st, Women's Eight
3rd, Women's Double Sculls

- 1998

1st, Women's Eight

- 1999

1st, Women's Eight

- 2001

1st, Women's Pair
2nd, Women's Eight

- 2002

1st, Women's Pair

- 2003

2nd, Women's Eight
3rd, Women's Pair
