= Maren Derlien =

German rower

Personal information
- Born: 17 December 1975 (age 50) Hamburg, West Germany
Medal record
Women's rowing
Representing Germany
World Rowing Championships
Gold medal – first place	1999 St. Catharines	Quad scull
Silver medal – second place	2006 Eton	Eight
European Rowing Championships
Gold medal – first place	2007 Poznań	Coxless pair

Maren Derlien (born 17 December 1975 in Hamburg) is a German rower. In 1999 she won the World Rowing Championships in St. Catharines, Canada in the quad sculls boat. In 2005, 2006 and 2007 she also rowed at the World Rowing Championships. She represented her native country at the 2004 Summer Olympics in Athens, Greece and at the 2008 Summer Olympics in Beijing, China.

== Club ==
In 2008 Derlien rowed for RG Hansa Hamburg in Hamburg.
