= Georgeta Damian =

Romanian rower

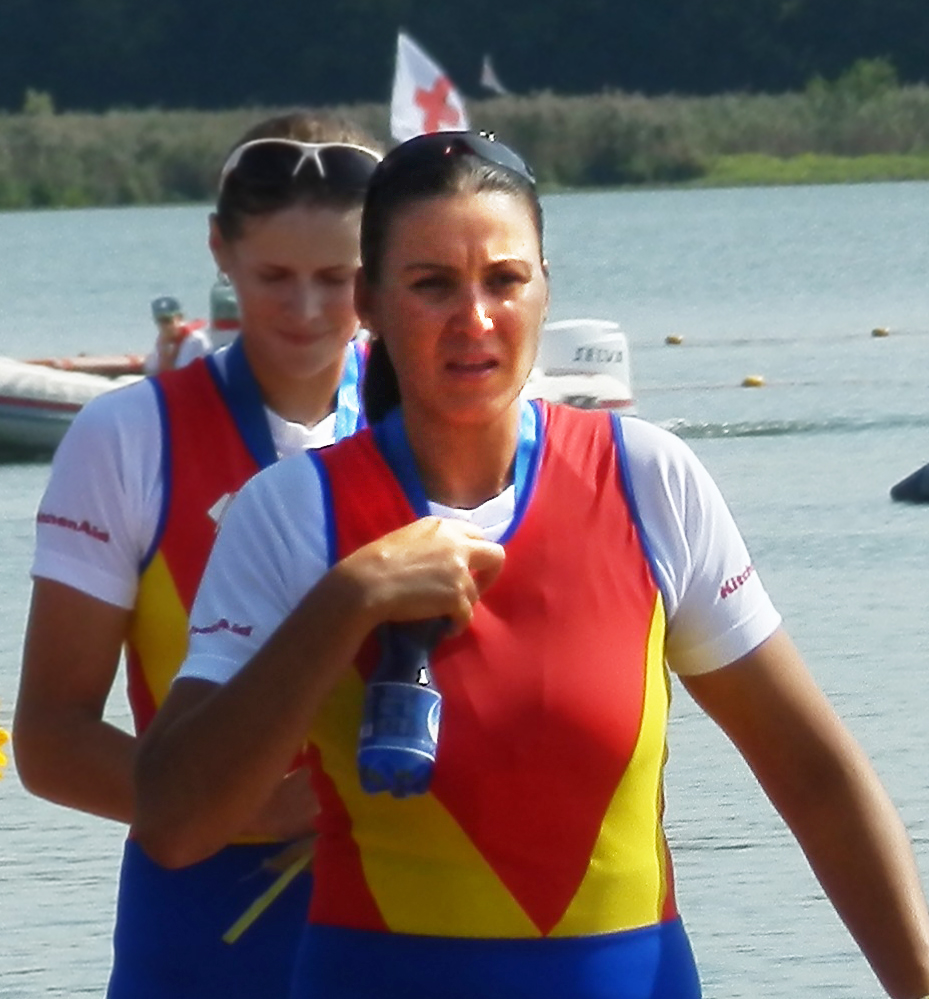

Medal record

Women's rowing

Representing Romania

Olympic Games
Gold medal – first place	2000 Sydney	Coxless pair
Gold medal – first place	2000 Sydney	Eight
Gold medal – first place	2004 Athens	Coxless pair
Gold medal – first place	2004 Athens	Eight
Gold medal – first place	2008 Beijing	Coxless pair
Bronze medal – third place	2008 Beijing	Eight

World Championships
Gold medal – first place	1997 Lac d'Aiguebelette	Eight
Gold medal – first place	1998 Cologne	Eight
Gold medal – first place	1999 St. Catharines	Eight
Gold medal – first place	2001 Lucerne	Coxless pair
Gold medal – first place	2002 Seville	Coxless pair
Silver medal – second place	1997 Lac d'Aiguebelette	Coxless pair
Silver medal – second place	2001 Lucerne	Eight
Silver medal – second place	2003 Milan	Eight
Silver medal – second place	2007 Munich	Eight
Bronze medal – third place	2003 Milan	Coxless pair
Bronze medal – third place	2007 Munich	Coxless pair

European Championships
Gold medal – first place	2007 Poznań	Eight
Gold medal – first place	2008 Marathon	Coxless pair
Gold medal – first place	2012 Varese	Eight

Georgeta Damian (married name Andruanche, born 14 April 1976 in Botoșani) is a female rower from Romania and winner of five Olympic gold medals. She married the rower Valeriu Andrunache in 2006.

Damian rowed in the Romanian Women's eight, that won the World Rowing Championships in 1997, 1998 and 1999, and the 2000 Summer Olympics, where she also won the Women's pairs. With Viorica Susanu, she won the World Championships in the pairs in 2001 and 2002, and at the 2004 Summer Olympics she won gold medals in both pairs and eights. At the 2008 Summer Olympics, she won gold in the women's pairs with Susanu, and bronze in the eights.

== Medals at Olympic Games ==
- 2008 Summer Olympics

1st, Women's coxless pair
3rd, Women's eight

- 2004 Summer Olympics
  1st, Women's eight
  1st, Women's coxless pair
- 2000 Summer Olympics

1st, Women's Eight
1st, Women's Pair

== Medals at World Championships ==
- 1997

1st, Women's Eight
2nd, Women's Pair

- 1998

1st, Women's Eight

- 1999

1st, Women's Eight

- 2001

1st, Women's Pair
2nd, Women's Eight

- 2002

1st, Women's Pair

- 2003

2nd, Women's Eight
3rd, Women's Pair

== See also ==
- List of multiple Olympic gold medalists
